= V National Assembly of Venezuela =

Legislature of Venezuela, 2021–2026

←	IV	VI	→
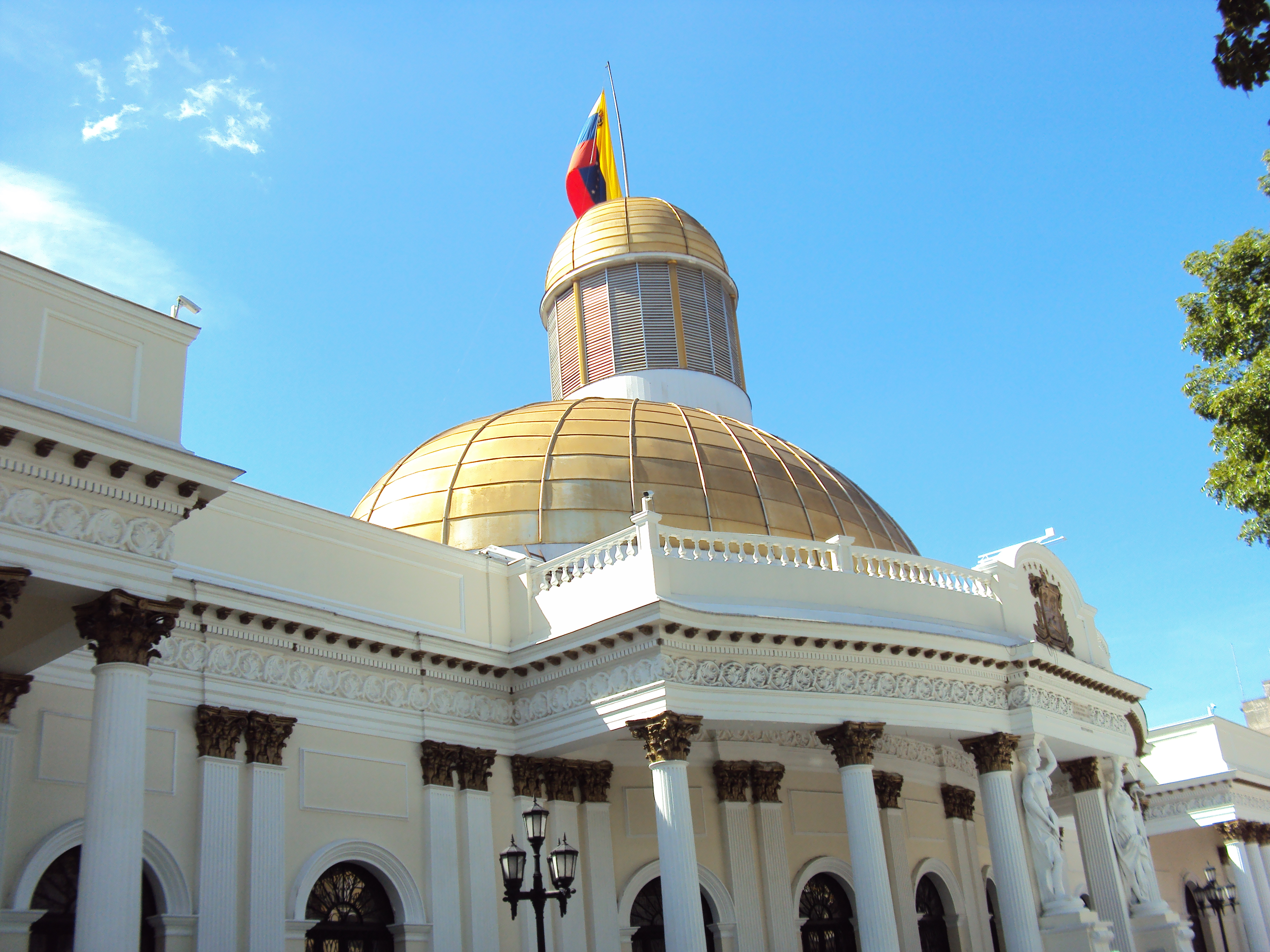
- Palacio Federal Legislativo

Overview
- Legislative body: National Assembly
- Term: January 5, 2021 – January 5, 2026
- Election: 2020 Venezuelan parliamentary election
- Members: 277
- President: Jorge Rodríguez (PSUV)
- Minority Leader: José Gregorio Correa (AD)
- Party control: Great Patriotic Pole

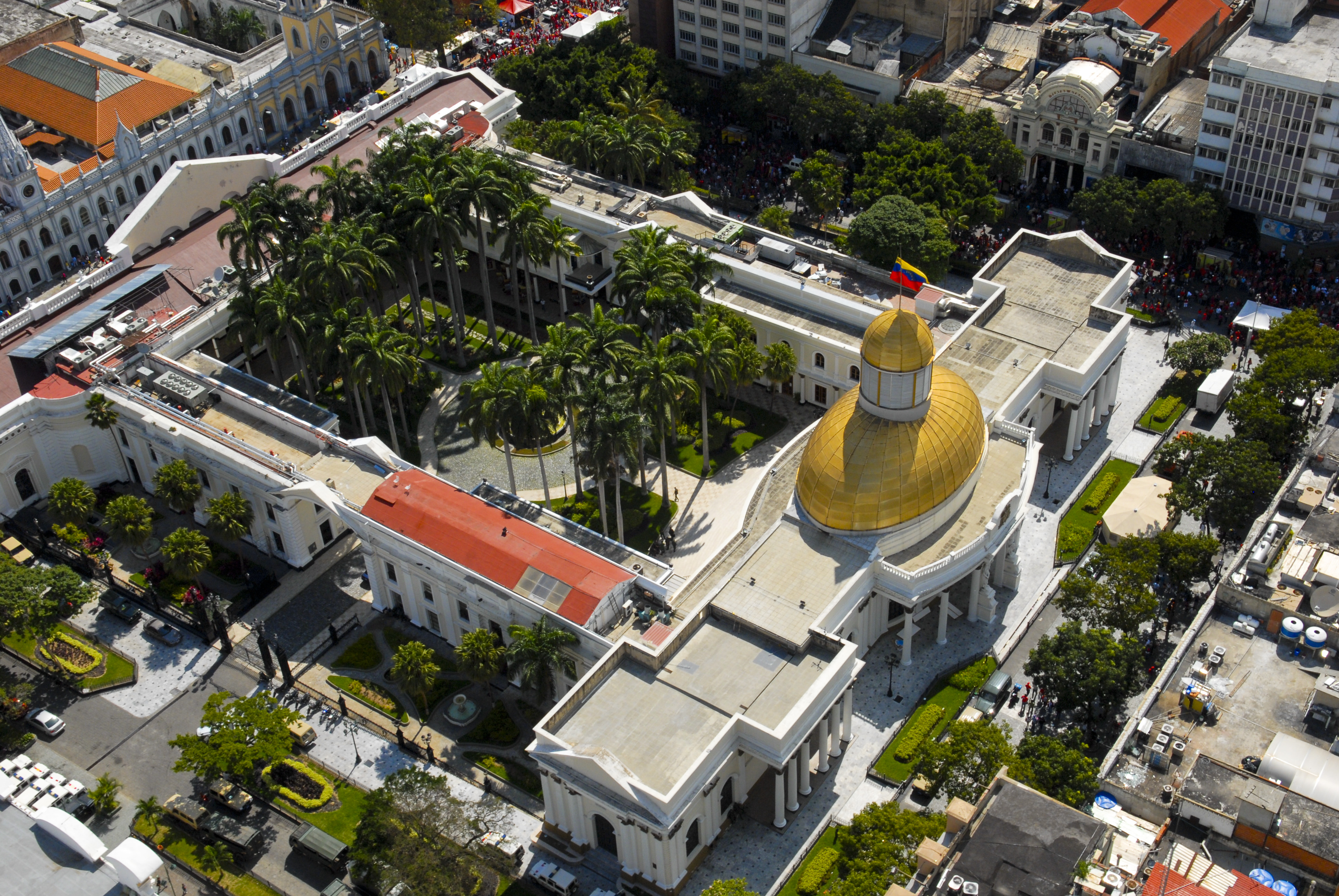
The Venezuelan National Assembly building.

The V National Assembly of Venezuela was the sitting National Assembly of Venezuela for the period 2021–2026. The National Assembly is the meeting of the legislative branch of the Venezuelan federal government. The V National Assembly met in the capital, Caracas, from 5 January 2021, following the 2020 Venezuelan parliamentary election.

== Background ==
The deputies who made up the pro-government–majority legislature were elected in the parliamentary elections of 6 December 2020, in which major sectors of the Venezuelan opposition neither participated nor presented candidates, alleging a lack of conditions for a clean and democratic process.

The opposition parties that made up the opposition bloc unanimously agreed not to participate in the parliamentary elections, citing allegations of irregularities in the planning of the elections and maintaining that they would likely be fraudulent. Twenty-seven parties signed the agreement, including the main parties Democratic Action, Justice First, A New Era and Popular Will.

However, in the case of parties such as Democratic Action, Copei, Popular Will, Fatherland for All and Tupamaro, participation took place under ad hoc leaderships imposed judicially months earlier by the Supreme Tribunal of Justice, headed by members of the respective parties who had been expelled on accusations of corruption. These actions were rejected and disavowed by the top representatives of the respective parties, who countered that the political manoeuvre had been done in order to simulate a false democracy at the international level.

In the fifth legislature, the Simón Bolívar Great Patriotic Pole held an absolute majority (over 98%), after having lost it in the 2015 elections, which had a 71% voter turnout, compared with only 30% turnout recorded in the December 2020 elections. (In 2015, the Democratic Unity Roundtable had gained control of two thirds of the Venezuelan parliament, reaching 112 seats out of a total of 167).

== History ==
The Supreme Tribunal of Justice of Venezuela declared on 5 June 2020 an unconstitutional omission by the IV National Assembly. After this declaration, the Supreme Tribunal of Justice prepared to appoint the members of the National Electoral Council (CNE), violating Article 8 of the Organic Law of Electoral Power.

On 12 June, in a forced manner, the Supreme Tribunal of Justice selected the new leadership of the National Electoral Council omitting the steps that the constitution assigns to the National Assembly.

Indira Maira Alfonzo Izaguirre was appointed as a principal rector and president of the National Electoral Council, while Rafael Simón Jiménez Melean was also made a principal rector and its vice-president. Tania D'Amelio Cardiet, Gladys María Gutiérrez Alvarado, and José Luis Gutiérrez Parra were also appointed as principal rectors.

The new National Electoral Council agreed on Tuesday, 30 June, to increase to 277 the number of deputies eligible for the National Assembly and announced that the upcoming parliamentary elections would be held in December 2020.

After the controversial elections of 6 December 2020, in which the PSUV-led Great Patriotic Pole alliance won a supermajority of seats, on 7 January Venezuela faced intense political polarization. Twenty-four countries expressed their support for the new National Assembly elected in 2020, while the previous, 2016 Assembly retained the support of most countries, including the European Union, the United States, and countries of the Lima Group.

On 5 January 2021, the new assembly was installed.

On 19 January 2021, U.S. Secretary of State Antony Blinken, appointed by then US president Joe Biden, reported that he would continue recognizing Juan Guaidó as interim president and supporting the 2016 National Assembly as the only legitimate democratic institution.

In February 2021, the assembly voted to expel the Ambassador from the European Union.

== Distribution of seats ==
The initial composition of the National Assembly was divided into four coalitions: the majority coalition made up of the pro-government bloc supporting President Nicolás Maduro and the self-styled Bolivarian Revolution, with 253 seats and an additional three seats from Indigenous representation, for a total of 256 deputies, thus obtaining a qualified majority in parliament. On the other hand, the minority consisted of the opposition bloc made up of deputies from the Democratic Alliance with 20 seats, and the "dissidence" belonging to the Popular Revolutionary Alternative with one representative. However, if the seat allocation system established by the TSJ had been applied, the distribution would have been as follows: GPPSB, 192; Democratic Alliance, 60; Popular Revolutionary Alternative, 7; and minor parties sharing 18 seats.

== Parliamentary groups ==
The following table shows the composition of the National Assembly for the 2021–2026 constitutional legislative term.

Alliance	Political party	Acronym	Deputies	
Alliance	Political party	Acronym	Principal	Alternate
Simón Bolívar Great Patriotic Pole	United Socialist Party of Venezuela	PSUV	222	221
Simón Bolívar Great Patriotic Pole	Fatherland for All	PPT	8	6
Simón Bolívar Great Patriotic Pole	Revolutionary Movement Tupamaro	TUPAMARO	7	5
Simón Bolívar Great Patriotic Pole	We Are Venezuela Movement	MSV	5	5
Simón Bolívar Great Patriotic Pole	Por la Democracia Social	PODEMOS	5	1
Simón Bolívar Great Patriotic Pole	Alianza para el Cambio	APC	3	1
Simón Bolívar Great Patriotic Pole	Movimiento Electoral del Pueblo	MEP	3	1
Simón Bolívar Great Patriotic Pole	Organización Renovadora Auténtica	ORA	1	2
Simón Bolívar Great Patriotic Pole	Unidad Popular Venezolana	UPV	2	2
Simón Bolívar Great Patriotic Pole	Movimiento Cristiano Evangélico por Venezuela	MOCEV	0	1
Simón Bolívar Great Patriotic Pole	Cátedra Guaicaipuro		3	3
Simón Bolívar Great Patriotic Pole	Total		256	248
Democratic Alliance	Democratic Action Ad hoc	AD Ad hoc	8	5
Democratic Alliance	Hope for Change	EL CAMBIO	4	2
Democratic Alliance	Copei Ad hoc	COPEI Ad hoc	3	7
Democratic Alliance	Progressive Advance	AP	2	1
Democratic Alliance	Venezuela First	PV	2	0
Democratic Alliance	Cambiemos Movimiento Ciudadano	CMC	1	3
Democratic Alliance	Popular Will Ad hoc	VP Ad hoc	0	1
Democratic Alliance	Venezuela Unida	VU	0	1
Democratic Alliance	Total		20	20
Popular Revolutionary Alternative	Communist Party of Venezuela	PCV	1	1
Popular Revolutionary Alternative	Total		1	1
Without representatives			0	8
Total			277	277

== Members ==
=== Pro-government ===
No.	Principal deputy	Federal entity	Coalition	Political party	Notes	Alternate deputy	Political party
1	Imarú González	Amazonas	GPPSB	PSUV		Gustavo Vásquez	PSUV
2	Alcides Sanz	Amazonas	GPPSB	PSUV		Cristian Ruíz	PSUV
3	Nileida Carrasquel	Amazonas	GPPSB	PSUV		María Carrasquel	PSUV
4	Fabio Cortéz	Amazonas	GPPSB	PSUV		Elsa Deremare	PSUV
5	Antonio Rumbos	Amazonas	GPPSB	PSUV		Dairy Castillo	PSUV
6	Vacant	Anzoátegui	GPPSB	PSUV	The principal deputy, Luis José Marcano, was elected Governor of Anzoátegui in the elections of 21 November 2021. The alternate deputy, Peter Sayago, was arrested in an alleged homicide case.	Vacant	
7	Lisett Muñoz	Anzoátegui	GPPSB	PSUV		Andrés López Morales	PSUV
8	José Cabellos (E)	Anzoátegui	GPPSB	PSUV	The principal deputy, Earle Herrera, died on 19 December 2021.	Vacant	
9	Carmen Márquez	Anzoátegui	GPPSB	PSUV		Yuri Jiménez	PSUV
10	Franklin Rondón	Anzoátegui	GPPSB	PSUV		Petra Tovar	PSUV
11	Alberto Gago	Anzoátegui	GPPSB	PSUV		Carmen Castillo Gil	PSUV
12	Lisset Sabino	Anzoátegui	GPPSB	PPT		Jorge Marcano	PSUV
13	Mercedes Sánchez	Anzoátegui	GPPSB	PSUV		Héctor Plata Morales	PSUV
14	Lemark Gómez	Anzoátegui	GPPSB	PSUV		Odalys Millán	PSUV
15	Fiodar Acosta	Anzoátegui	GPPSB	PSUV		Maira Arevalo	PSUV
16	Ángel Rodríguez Gamboa	Anzoátegui	GPPSB	PSUV		Elizabeth García Sifontes	PSUV
17	Melitza Orellana (E)	Apure	GPPSB	PSUV	The principal deputy Jeycar Pérez was arrested and accused of being involved in a drug-trafficking network.	Vacant	
18	Jesús Suárez Chourio	Apure	GPPSB	PSUV		Leonor Olivares	PSUV
19	Edgar Acosta Añez	Apure	GPPSB	PSUV		José Cabrera Cuervo	PSUV
20	Daniela Urbano	Apure	GPPSB	PSUV		César Galipolly	PSUV
21	Enma Díaz	Apure	GPPSB	PSUV		Pastor Suárez	PSUV
22	Héctor Zambrano	Apure	GPPSB	PSUV		Mairut Castillo	PSUV
23	Rosa del Valle León	Aragua	GPPSB	PSUV		Isabel Torcate	PSUV
24	Hermann Escarrá	Aragua	GPPSB	PSUV		Guaiquirima Castro	PSUV
25	Ricardo Molina	Aragua	GPPSB	PSUV		Gerson Hernández	PSUV
26	Vladimir Miró Mieres	Aragua	GPPSB	PPT		Marisol Calderón	TUPAMARO
27	José Gregorio Colmenares	Aragua	GPPSB	PSUV		Isabel Figueredo	PSUV
28	Anahis Palacios	Aragua	GPPSB	PSUV		Antonio Cabanillas	PSUV
29	Roque Valero	Aragua	GPPSB	PSUV		Aidelys Oyón	PSUV
30	Roy Daza	Aragua	GPPSB	PSUV		Aurora Paredes	PSUV
31	Eglé Sánchez	Aragua	GPPSB	PSUV		Jesús "Chuy" Pérez	PSUV
32	Roger Pinto	Aragua	GPPSB	TUPAMARO		Katiuska Rojas	PSUV
33	Manuel Hernández	Aragua	GPPSB	PSUV		María de la Paz	PSUV
34	Franklin Peña	Barinas	GPPSB	PSUV		Luis Guzmán	PSUV
35	Nancy Pérez Sierra	Barinas	GPPSB	PSUV		Ailín García	MSV
36	Yudis Betancourt	Barinas	GPPSB	PSUV		José Gregorio Solís	PSUV
37	Hugo Chávez Terán	Barinas	GPPSB	PSUV		Norelis Silva	PSUV
38	Ignacio Buznego	Barinas	GPPSB	MEP		Yeiser Becerra	PSUV
39	Naybeth Berrios	Barinas	GPPSB	PSUV		Maikel Sánchez	PSUV
40	Marcos Dugarte	Barinas	GPPSB	PSUV		María Flores	PSUV
41	Leonel González	Bolívar	GPPSB	PSUV		Leida Estanga	PSUV
42	Rhoy Betancourt (E)	Bolívar	GPPSB	PODEMOS	The principal deputy José Ramón Rivero was appointed Minister of Labour.	Vacant	
43	Alexis Rodríguez Cabello	Bolívar	GPPSB	PSUV		Richard Rosa	PSUV
44	Nancy Ascencio	Bolívar	GPPSB	PSUV		Yanny Alonzo	PSUV
45	Gabriel Franco	Bolívar	GPPSB	PSUV		Eucarys Toussaintt	PSUV
46	Liris Sol Velásquez	Bolívar	GPPSB	PSUV		Roinald Quiaragua	PSUV
47	Angélica Barroso (E)	Bolívar	GPPSB	PSUV	The principal deputy, Ángel Marcano, was elected Governor of Bolívar in the elections of 21 November 2021.	Vacant	
48	Raiza Lanz	Bolívar	GPPSB	TUPAMARO		Luis Alberto Blanca	PPT
49	Ronald Bastardo	Bolívar	GPPSB	PSUV		Lissett Díaz Álvarez	MSV
50	Bussy Galeano	Carabobo	GPPSB	PSUV		Osmila Rivero	PSUV
51	Héctor Agüero	Carabobo	GPPSB	PSUV		Augusto Martínez Vicuña	PSUV
52	Saúl Ortega	Carabobo	GPPSB	PSUV		José Parada Ramírez	PSUV
53	Edgar Humberto González	Carabobo	GPPSB	PPT		Neider Lara	PSUV
54	José Vielma Mora	Carabobo	GPPSB	PSUV		Miriam Pérez	PSUV
55	Juan Samuel Cohen	Carabobo	GPPSB	PSUV		Dorangel Peraza	PSUV
56	Rafael Enrique Ramos	Carabobo	GPPSB	PSUV		Mervelis Moreno	PSUV
57	Reinaldo Rodríguez	Carabobo	GPPSB	PSUV		Jessica Bello	PSUV
58	Jesús Santander	Carabobo	GPPSB	PODEMOS		Clarismar Cocho	PSUV
59	Blanca Rodríguez	Carabobo	GPPSB	PSUV		Enmanuel Reyes Barrios	ORA
60	Yonder Silva	Carabobo	GPPSB	PSUV		Indira Triviño	PSUV
61	Maritza Guzmán	Carabobo	GPPSB	PSUV		Miyer Mina	PSUV
62	Ekalov González	Carabobo	GPPSB	PSUV		Elizabeth Niño	PSUV
63	Juliana Ruiz	Carabobo	GPPSB	TUPAMARO		Ricardo Zerpa	PSUV
64	Alexis Ortilez	Carabobo	GPPSB	PSUV		Belkys Gamboa	PSUV
65	Yeissis Orozco	Cojedes	GPPSB	PODEMOS		Janeth Camacaro	PSUV
66	Marcos Antonio Mendoza	Cojedes	GPPSB	PSUV		María Álvarez	PSUV
67	Nosliw Rodríguez	Cojedes	GPPSB	PSUV		César Hernández	PSUV
68	Yenis Cepeda	Cojedes	GPPSB	PSUV		Oswaldo Andara	PPT
69	John Moreno	Cojedes	GPPSB	PSUV		Crismari Parada	PSUV
70	Emmanuel Delgado	Cojedes	GPPSB	PSUV		José Aular	PSUV
71	Leonardo Chirinos Uribe	Delta Amacuro	GPPSB	APC		Rosa Francia Guzmán	PSUV
72	Pedro Carreño	Delta Amacuro	GPPSB	PSUV		Carlos Enrique Gómez	PSUV
73	Yaritza Martínez	Delta Amacuro	GPPSB	PSUV		Tony Larez	TUPAMARO
74	Pedro Santaella	Delta Amacuro	GPPSB	PSUV		María González Cabello	PSUV
75	Francisco Martínez Cabrera	Delta Amacuro	GPPSB	PSUV		Elizabeth Arrieta	PSUV
76	Zulaymis Gascón	Delta Amacuro	GPPSB	PSUV		Enmanuel Brito	PSUV
77	Rodbexa Poleo	Falcón	GPPSB	PSUV		Jorge Luis Chirinos	PSUV
78	Kristal Alvarado	Falcón	GPPSB	PODEMOS		Milagros Sequera	PSUV
79	Alberto Alvarado (E)	Falcón	GPPSB	PSUV	The principal deputy, Henry Ventura, died on 1 May 2021, due to complications from COVID-19.	Vacant	
80	Antonio Sivira	Falcón	GPPSB	PSUV		Fiorella Leal	PSUV
81	Fernando Bastidas	Falcón	GPPSB	PSUV		Miriam González	PSUV
82	Andrés Eloy Méndez	Falcón	GPPSB	PSUV		Marelys Castro	PSUV
83	Genesis Garvett	Falcón	GPPSB	PSUV		Charly García Salas	PSUV
84	Ruluc Solórzano	Guárico	GPPSB	PSUV		José Leopoldo Matos	PSUV
85	Frang Morales	Guárico	GPPSB	PSUV		Tania Altuve	PSUV
86	José Juvenal Muñóz	Guárico	GPPSB	PSUV		Pablo Alvarado Ramos	PSUV
87	Katherine Helen Guanipa Miranda	Guárico	GPPSB	PSUV		Luisa Tabares	PSUV
88	Luisa Rodríguez (E)	Guárico	GPPSB	PSUV	The principal deputy Fernando Ríos died in a traffic accident.	Vacant	
89	Ramón Magallanes	Guárico	GPPSB	PSUV		Reina Sifontes	PSUV
90	Eduardo Puerta	Guárico	GPPSB	PSUV		Yelitza Zamora	PSUV
91	Nicolás Maduro Guerra	La Guaira	GPPSB	PSUV		Carlos Pacheco Isava	PPT
92	Rudy Puerta	La Guaira	GPPSB	PSUV		Edgar Urbina	PSUV
93	Irlanda Rodríguez	La Guaira	GPPSB	PSUV		Marcos Meléndez	PSUV
94	Oswaldo Vera	La Guaira	GPPSB	PSUV		Durga Ochoa	UPV
95	María Gabriela Vega	La Guaira	GPPSB	PSUV		Mario Castillo	PSUV
96	Giuseppe Alessandrello	La Guaira	GPPSB	PSUV		Jazmín Reyes	PSUV
97	Alexis León	Lara	GPPSB	TUPAMARO		Yoel Morales	PSUV
98	Willian Gil	Lara	GPPSB	PSUV		Carolina Monserrath García	PSUV
99	Blanca Romero	Lara	GPPSB	PSUV		Luis Contreras Hernández	PSUV
100	Francisco Ameliach	Lara	GPPSB	PSUV		Carlos Rodríguez Raban	PSUV
101	Julio Chávez	Lara	GPPSB	PSUV		Erika Sarmiento	PSUV
102	Andrés Avelino Álvarez	Lara	GPPSB	APC		María Casanova Cappola	PSUV
103	Maira Rojas Pérez	Lara	GPPSB	PSUV		Elvis Méndez	PSUV
104	Derby Guédez (E)	Lara	GPPSB	PSUV	The alternate deputy María Bogado was arrested and accused of drug trafficking in 2022	Vacant	
105	Ginkellys Gutiérrez	Lara	GPPSB	PSUV		Wuilian Montaño	PPT
106	Alejandro Natera	Lara	GPPSB	PSUV		Yhoanna Linarez	PSUV
107	Juan Carlos Sierra	Lara	GPPSB	PSUV		Kenny Paola García	PSUV
108	Yanis Agüero (E)	Lara	GPPSB	PSUV	The alternate deputy Patricia Pérez died days after being elected.	Vacant	
109	César Carrero	Mérida	GPPSB	PSUV	The principal deputy, Jehyson Guzmán, was elected governor of the state of Mérida in the elections of 21 November 2021.	Vacant	
110	Niloha Delgado	Mérida	GPPSB	PSUV		Rodolfo Zerpa	PSUV
111	Arnaldo Sánchez	Mérida	GPPSB	PSUV		Roberto Naranjo	PSUV
112	Ramón Lobo	Mérida	GPPSB	PSUV		Maisuri Bonilla	PSUV
113	Idania Quintero	Mérida	GPPSB	PSUV		Yeimi Suárez	PSUV
114	José Uzcátegui	Mérida	GPPSB	PSUV		Leticia Rangel	MEP
115	José Uzcátegui	Mérida	GPPSB	TUPAMARO	The principal deputy, Julio Torres, was arrested, accused of drug possession, and had parliamentary immunity lifted.	Vacant	
116	Gabriela Chacón	Miranda	GPPSB	PSUV		Ronald Aramburo	PSUV
117	Thayde Monzón	Miranda	GPPSB	PSUV		Emma Cesin	MSV
118	Winston Vallenilla	Miranda	GPPSB	PSUV		Julio Toro Rivero	PSUV
119	Rodolfo Crespo	Miranda	GPPSB	PSUV		María Luisa Freire	PSUV
120	Gabriela Peña Martínez	Miranda	GPPSB	PSUV		Luis Álvarez Zapata	TUPAMARO
121	Alberto Aranguibel	Miranda	GPPSB	PSUV	Removed from office	Ruth Amatima	PSUV
122	Willian Rodríguez Gamboa	Miranda	GPPSB	PPT		José Pérez Sojo	PSUV
123	Blanca Eekhout	Miranda	GPPSB	PSUV		Ana Sanoja de Torres	PSUV
124	Liliana González	Miranda	GPPSB	PSUV		Pedro Rodríguez Calderón	PSUV
125	Francisco González Camperos	Miranda	GPPSB	PSUV		Yeureska La Rosa	PSUV
126	Sony Sánchez	Miranda	GPPSB	PSUV		Juan Montilla	PSUV
127	Janitza Rondón	Miranda	GPPSB	UPV		Jhorman Vargas	PSUV
128	Darwin Jaramillo	Miranda	GPPSB	PSUV		Carmen Cisneros	PSUV
129	Oriana Osio	Miranda	GPPSB	PSUV		Héctor Mijares	PSUV
130	Leonardo Montezuma	Miranda	GPPSB	PSUV		Adyaniz Noguera	PSUV
131	Elio Serrano	Miranda	GPPSB	PSUV		Maira Alejandra Gutiérrez	PSUV
132	Azucena Jaspe	Miranda	GPPSB	PSUV		Yahir Muñoz	PSUV
133	Rodolfo Eduardo Sanz	Miranda	GPPSB	PSUV		Isabel Uzcátegui	PSUV
134	Ernesto Luna	Monagas	GPPSB	PSUV	The principal deputy, Ernesto Luna, was elected governor of Monagas in the elections of 21 November 2021. William Golindano assumed as principal deputy.	William Golindano	PSUV
135	Euribes Guevara	Monagas	GPPSB	PSUV		Eirimar Malavé	PSUV
136	Marleny Contreras	Monagas	GPPSB	PSUV		María Gabriela Vallenilla	PSUV
137	Omar Farías	Monagas	GPPSB	PSUV		María Villarroel Sanabria	PSUV
138	Gloria Castillo	Monagas	GPPSB	PSUV		Ernesto Ruiz	PSUV
139	Irwing Monteverde	Monagas	GPPSB	PSUV		Diomara Romero	PSUV
140	Ana Fuentes	Monagas	GPPSB	PSUV		Carlos Jesús Martínez	TUPAMARO
141	Dante Rivas	Nueva Esparta	GPPSB	PSUV		Yul Armas	PODEMOS
142	María Carolina Chávez	Nueva Esparta	GPPSB	PSUV		César Augusto González	PSUV
143	Junior Gómez	Nueva Esparta	GPPSB	PSUV		Ruddy Rodríguez	PSUV
144	José del Carmen Millán	Nueva Esparta	GPPSB	PSUV		Minerva Custodio	PSUV
145	América Pérez	Nueva Esparta	GPPSB	PSUV		Carlos Sulbaran	PSUV
146	Juan Francisco Escalona	Portuguesa	GPPSB	PSUV		Herminia Morales	PSUV
147	Marifred Rodríguez	Portuguesa	GPPSB	PSUV		José Gregorio González	PSUV
148	Jocsen Alvarado	Portuguesa	GPPSB	PSUV		Jhonatan Cedeño	PSUV
149	Francar Martínez	Portuguesa	GPPSB	MSV		Laura Guédez	PSUV
150	Vacant	Portuguesa			The principal deputy Francisco Torrealba was appointed Minister of Labour.	Evelyn Díaz	PSUV
151	José Pérez Alejo	Portuguesa	GPPSB	PPT		Yasmina Harris	PSUV
152	Arelis Orta	Portuguesa	GPPSB	PSUV		Hugo Mora	PSUV
153	Erick Mago	Sucre	GPPSB	PSUV		Yaritza Vallenilla	PSUV
154	Carlos Alberto Martínez	Sucre	GPPSB	PPT		María Elisa Chirinos	PSUV
155	Jonan Cedeño	Sucre	GPPSB	PSUV	The principal deputy, Gilberto Pinto Blanco, was elected Governor of Sucre in the elections of 21 November 2021. Jonan Cedeño assumed as principal deputy.	Vacant	
156	Francilvys Martínez	Sucre	GPPSB	PSUV		Alexander Falfan	PSUV
157	Felix Barrios	Sucre	GPPSB	PSUV		Karenly Sánchez	PSUV
158	Marglevys de la Rosa	Sucre	GPPSB	PSUV		José Ángel Ramírez	PSUV
159	Antonio Hernández	Sucre	GPPSB	PSUV		Yelitza Nazareth	PSUV
160	Esteban Fernández Vega	Táchira	GPPSB	TUPAMARO		William Camacho	APC
161	Grecia Colmenares	Táchira	GPPSB	PSUV		José Leonardo Rosales	PSUV
162	Haydée Parra	Táchira	GPPSB	PSUV	The principal deputy, Freddy Bernal, was elected governor of Táchira in the elections of 21 November 2021.	Vacant	PSUV
163	Johana Rosales	Táchira	GPPSB	PSUV		José Leonardo Rojas	PSUV
164	Marta Gallo	Táchira	GPPSB	PSUV		Carlos Tovar	PSUV
165	Williams Parada	Táchira	GPPSB	PSUV		Jessica Moreno	PSUV
166	Julio García Zerpa	Táchira	GPPSB	PSUV		Keyla Hernández	PSUV
167	Willy Medina	Táchira	GPPSB	PSUV		Olga Díaz	MSV
168	Hugbel Roa	Trujillo	GPPSB	PSUV	Removed for corruption	María Materano	PSUV
169	Gerardo Márquez	Trujillo	GPPSB	PSUV		Irayluz Terán	PSUV
170	Candelario Briceño	Trujillo	GPPSB	MEP		Angélica Morón	PSUV
171	Michel Duque	Trujillo	GPPSB	PSUV		Maura González	PSUV
172	Yolmar Gudiño	Trujillo	GPPSB	PSUV	Removed from office	Ledy Torres	PSUV
173	Francisco García	Trujillo	GPPSB	PSUV		Luzmar de Valera	PSUV
174	Laidely Griman	Trujillo	GPPSB	PSUV		Dennys Guédez	PSUV
175	Daimar Rodríguez	Yaracuy	GPPSB	PSUV	The elected principal deputy Humberto Silva died of COVID-19 before taking office.	Vacant	
176	Imarú Bolívar	Yaracuy	GPPSB	PSUV		Carlos Luis Puerta	PSUV
177	Carlos Alberto Gamarra	Yaracuy	GPPSB	PSUV		Gisela de la Coromoto Tovar	PPT
178	Rosario Montaño	Yaracuy	GPPSB	PSUV		Jesús Rodríguez Estrada	PSUV
179	Braulio Álvarez	Yaracuy	GPPSB	PSUV		Yasnedi Guarnieri	PSUV
180	Juan Díaz	Yaracuy	GPPSB	PSUV		Ysis Cordero	PSUV
181	Imad Saab Saab	Zulia	GPPSB	PSUV		Joel Evelio Cedeño	PSUV
182	Aloha Núñez	Zulia	GPPSB	PSUV		Yeritzon Ríos	PSUV
183	César Molina	Zulia	GPPSB	PSUV		Grace Urdaneta	UPV
184	Emilio Colina	Zulia	GPPSB	PSUV		Ruben Trujillo	MOCEV
185	Javier Briceño (E)	Zulia	GPPSB	PSUV	The principal deputy Taina González was arrested for alleged drug trafficking.	Vacant	PSUV
186	Oscar Vázquez Echeverría	Zulia	GPPSB	PSUV		Alexander Villasmil	PPT
187	Ida Elena León	Zulia	GPPSB	PSUV		Carlos Alfonso Zabala	PSUV
188	Lisandro Cabello	Zulia	GPPSB	PSUV		Rafael Hernández Parra	PSUV
189	Manuel Quevedo	Zulia	GPPSB	PSUV		Juan Francisco García	PSUV
190	Benilda Puche	Zulia	GPPSB	PSUV		Hebert Chacón	PSUV
191	José Luis Bermúdez	Zulia	GPPSB	PSUV		Soneida Rivero	PSUV
192	Robert Sandoval	Zulia	GPPSB	PSUV		Yolly Montilla	PSUV
193	Elbano Sánchez	Zulia	GPPSB	PSUV		Aleida Cardozo	PSUV
194	Rafael Nava	Zulia	GPPSB	PSUV		Liceila Urdaneta	PSUV
195	Gerardina Parada	Zulia	GPPSB	PSUV		John Antúnez	PSUV
196	Jhonny Bracho	Zulia	GPPSB	PSUV		Gladys Mengual	PSUV
197	Anuar Younese	Zulia	GPPSB	PSUV		Liliana Salas	PSUV
198	Yonder Durán	Zulia	GPPSB	PSUV		Zuyín Pérez	PSUV
199	Damelis Chávez	Zulia	GPPSB	PSUV		Jairo González	PSUV
200	Fidel Madroñero	Zulia	GPPSB	PSUV		Misleidy Mengual	PSUV
201	Nayary Linares	Zulia	GPPSB	PSUV		José Fleire	PSUV
202	Antonio "Tony" Boza	Zulia	GPPSB	PSUV		Desirée Fernández	PSUV
203	Maritza Matos (E)	Zulia	GPPSB	PSUV	The principal deputy Jean Carlos Martínez died due to complications from COVID-19.	Vacant	
204	Juan Romero	Zulia	GPPSB	PSUV		Iraima Díaz	PSUV
205	María Rosa Jiménez	Capital District	GPPSB	PSUV		David Graterol	PSUV
206	Fidel Ernesto Vásquez	Capital District	GPPSB	PSUV		To be determined	
207	Carolina Cestari	Capital District	GPPSB	PSUV		Carlos Abelardo Sierra	PSUV
208	Jorge Rodríguez Gómez	Capital District	GPPSB	PSUV		Griselda Oliveros	PSUV
209	Carmen Centeno Zerpa	Capital District	GPPSB	PSUV		Francisco Quevedo	PSUV
210	Albino José Bracho	Capital District	GPPSB	PPT		Ligia Machado	PSUV
211	Juan Carlos Alemán	Capital District	GPPSB	PSUV		Dorelys Castellano	PSUV
212	Rigel Sergent	Capital District	GPPSB	PSUV		Nirca Tiamo	PSUV
213	Antonio Benavides Torres	Capital District	GPPSB	PSUV		Joseph López Rico	PSUV
214	Carlos Mogollón	Capital District	GPPSB	PSUV		Isbelia Malavé	PSUV
215	Pedro Infante	Capital District	GPPSB	PSUV		Yuset Brito	PSUV
216	Alexander Vargas	Capital District	GPPSB	MSV		Yajaira Meléndez	PSUV
217	Carmen Quintero Rojas (E)	National	GPPSB	PSUV	The principal deputy Diosdado Cabello was appointed Minister of Interior, Justice and Peace.	Vacant	
218	Cilia Flores	National	GPPSB	PSUV		Juan Simón Primera	PSUV
219	Tania Díaz	National	GPPSB	PSUV		Marelis Pérez Marcano	PSUV
220	Iris Varela	National	GPPSB	PSUV		Elvis Hidrobo Pérez	PSUV
221	Jesús Faría	National	GPPSB	PSUV		Noel Jover Avendaño	PSUV
222	Vanesa Montero	National	GPPSB	MSV		William Fariñas	PSUV
223	Williams Benavides	National	GPPSB	TUPAMARO		Asdrubal Coromoto Salazar	PSUV
224	Ilenia Medina	National	GPPSB	PPT		Diogenes Linares	PSUV
225	Gilberto Giménez	National	GPPSB	MEP		Alí Alejandro Primera	PSUV
226	Ricardo Sánchez	National	GPPSB	APC		Ausberto Díaz	PSUV
227	Didalco Bolívar	National	GPPSB	PODEMOS		Jesús Marcano Tenía	PSUV
228	Henry Hernández	National	GPPSB	UPV		Karelys Medrano	PSUV
229	José Francisco Espinoza (E)	National	GPPSB	PSUV	The principal deputy Luis Reyes died.	Vacant	
230	Noelí Pocaterra	National	GPPSB	PSUV		David Jiménez Pérez	PSUV
231	María León (E)	National	GPPSB	PSUV	The alternate deputy Rito Jiménez Escalona (PODEMOS) died of COVID-19.	Vacant	
232	Fernando Soto Rojas	National	GPPSB	PSUV		Denis Soto	PSUV
233	Jesús Martínez	National	GPPSB	PSUV		Gustavo Villapol	PSUV
234	vacant	National	GPPSB	PSUV	The principal deputy, Gladys Requena, was appointed Inspector General of Courts on 26 April 2022.	Vacant	PSUV
235	Asia Villegas	National	GPPSB	PSUV		Herick Goicoechea	PSUV
236	Mario Silva	National	GPPSB	PSUV		Daniel Charaima	PSUV
237	Hanthony Coello	National	GPPSB	PSUV		Yanetzy Urbina	PSUV
238	Wills Rangel	National	GPPSB	PSUV		Cecilia Perozo	PSUV
239	Miguel Pérez Abad	National	GPPSB	PSUV		Maire Castillo Gómez	PSUV
240	Pedro Lander	National	GPPSB	PSUV		Roraima Gutiérrez	PSUV
241	Desirée Santos Amaral	National	GPPSB	PSUV		Demetria Monasterio	PSUV
242	Roberto Messuti	National	GPPSB	MSV		Kelvis Maldonado	PSUV
243	Orlando Camacho	National	GPPSB	MSV		Guillermo Sulbaran	PSUV
244	Nicia Maldonado	National	GPPSB	PSUV		Moises García	PSUV
245	Cristóbal Jiménez	National	GPPSB	PSUV		Doily Hernández	PSUV
246	Sol Musset	National	GPPSB	PSUV		Kennedy Morales	PSUV
247	Diva Guzmán	National	GPPSB	PSUV		Angélica González	PSUV
248	José Villarroel	National	GPPSB	PSUV		Orlando Pérez	PSUV
249	Petra Aray	National	GPPSB	PSUV		Rafael Chacón	PSUV
250	Victoria Mata	National	GPPSB	PSUV		Jesús González Barrios	PSUV
251	Ricardo González Alvarado	National	GPPSB	PSUV		Armando Oliver	PSUV
252	Edgardo Antonio Ramírez	National	GPPSB	PSUV		Lionel Muñóz	PSUV
253	Luz Coromoto Chacón	National	GPPSB	PSUV		Dilber Rodríguez	PSUV
254	Kariela Aray	Indigenous representative, Eastern Region	GPPSB	CÁTEDRA		María Yánez Ortíz	CÁTEDRA
255	Yimmys Rodríguez	Indigenous representative, Western Region	GPPSB	CÁTEDRA		Dulce Montiel	CÁTEDRA
256	José Nelson Mavio	Indigenous representative, Southern Region	GPPSB	CÁTEDRA		Neiva Juliana Pérez	CÁTEDRA

=== Opposition ===
No.	Principal deputy	Federal entity	Coalition	Political party	Notes	Alternate deputy	Political party
1	Nixon Maniglia	Amazonas	Democratic Alliance	Democratic Action Ad hoc		Carmen Alicia Calderón	Copei Ad hoc
2	Luis Eduardo Martínez	Aragua	Democratic Alliance	Democratic Action Ad hoc		Melva Paredes	CMC
3	Javier Segovia	Bolívar	Democratic Alliance	Hope for Change		Noel Vargas Pérez	Copei Ad hoc
4	Javier Bertucci	Carabobo	Democratic Alliance	Hope for Change		Winston González	Democratic Action Ad hoc
5	Ángel Ocanto	Lara	Democratic Alliance	Progressive Advance		Humberto Berroterán	Copei Ad hoc
6	Juan Carlos Alvarado	Miranda	Democratic Alliance	Copei Ad hoc		Israel Herrera	Democratic Action Ad hoc
7	Óscar Ronderos	Nueva Esparta	Democratic Alliance	Democratic Action Ad hoc		Luis Villarroel	Copei Ad hoc
8	Ezequiel Pérez Roa	Táchira	Democratic Alliance	Democratic Action Ad hoc		Melina Vásquez	Copei Ad hoc
9	Alexander Cordero Graterol	Zulia	Democratic Alliance	Copei Ad hoc		Mary Álvarez	CMC
10	Rubén Limas	Capital District	Democratic Alliance	Democratic Action Ad hoc		Carlos Melo	Copei Ad hoc
11	Bernabé Gutiérrez	National	Democratic Alliance	Democratic Action Ad hoc		Orangel Salas Borges	Democratic Action Ad hoc
12	Anyelith Tamayo	National	Democratic Alliance	Democratic Action Ad hoc		Pedro Rojas Chirinos	Democratic Action Ad hoc
13	José Gregorio Correa	National	Democratic Alliance	Democratic Action Ad hoc		Juan Carlos Palencia	Democratic Action Ad hoc
14	Alfonso Campos Jessurun	National	Democratic Alliance	Hope for Change		Jeickson Portillo	Hope for Change
15	Yobany Blanco	National	Democratic Alliance	Hope for Change		Yosmer Quintero	Hope for Change
16	Luis Augusto Romero	National	Democratic Alliance	Progressive Advance		Bruno Gallo	Progressive Advance
17	Miguel Salazar	National	Democratic Alliance	Copei Ad hoc		Franklyn Duarte	Copei Ad hoc
18	Timoteo Zambrano	National	Democratic Alliance	CMC		Francisco Matheus	CMC
19	Luis Parra	National	Democratic Alliance	Venezuela First (PV)		Chaim Bucarán	VU
20	José Brito	National	Democratic Alliance	Venezuela First (PV)		José Gregorio Noriega	Popular Will Ad hoc

=== Dissident Chavismo ===
No.	Principal deputy	Federal entity	Coalition	Political party	Notes	Alternate deputy	Political party
1	Óscar Figuera	National	Popular Revolutionary Alternative (APR)	Communist Party of Venezuela (PCV)		Luisa González	Communist Party of Venezuela (PCV)

== See also ==
- I National Assembly of Venezuela
- II National Assembly of Venezuela
- III National Assembly of Venezuela
- IV National Assembly of Venezuela
- VI National Assembly of Venezuela
