= 2020 Venezuelan parliamentary election =

- 6 December 2020
- 277 seats in the National Assembly; 139 seats needed for a majority
- Turnout: 30.46% (▼43.58pp) (Note: Official results per the National Electoral Council.)
Party	Leader	Vote %	Seats	+/–
GPPSB	Jorge Rodríguez	62.34	256	+204
AD (ad hoc)	José Bernabé Gutiérrez	6.92	11	−14
EL CAMBIO	Javier Bertucci	4.54	3	New
PV	Luis Parra	2.99	2	New
COPEI (ad hoc)	Miguel Salazar	2.81	1	+1
PCV	Óscar Figuera	2.72	1	−1
AP	Henri Falcón	2.49	3	+1
This lists parties that won seats. See the complete results below.
Results by constituency and party-list vote by state.
President of the National Assembly before	President of the National Assembly
Disputed	Jorge Rodríguez; PSUV-GPPSB

Parliamentary elections were held in Venezuela on 6 December 2020. Aside from the 167 deputies of the National Assembly who are eligible to be re-elected, the new National Electoral Council president announced that the assembly would increase by 110 seats, for a total of 277 deputies to be elected.

The opposition parties that make up the Democratic Unity Roundtable (MUD) coalition agreed unanimously not to participate in the election, stating the reason as irregularities and their complaints during the planning of the process and arguing that it was likely the election would be fraudulent. Twenty-seven political parties signed the agreement, including the four largest opposition parties Popular Will, Justice First, Democratic Action and A New Era.

The opposition criticized the appointment of the members of the National Electoral Council by the Supreme Tribunal, stating that it is under the purview of the National Assembly, and at least seven political parties had their board of directors suspended or replaced by the pro-government Supreme Tribunal of Justice, including Popular Will, Justice First, Democratic Action, and Copei, as well as left-wing political parties, including Tupamaro, Fatherland for All, and Red Flag. Opposition politicians Henrique Capriles and Stalin González initially encouraged participation in the elections. They later withdrew and demanded better electoral conditions.

The Lima Group, the International Contact Group, the European Union and the United States rejected holding parliamentary elections in 2020, insisting in the necessity of holding elections "with free and fair conditions." The International Contact Group, headed by Uruguay, stated the formation of the Electoral Council "undermines the credibility of the next electoral process." The Organization of American States (OAS) stated the appointment of the Electoral Council was "illegal", rejecting it, and further stated that independent bodies are needed for "transparent, free and fair" elections to take place in the country. In July, the Office of the United Nations High Commissioner for Human Rights, headed by Michelle Bachelet, said that "the recent decisions of the Supreme Tribunal of Justice diminish the possibility to build conditions for democratic and credible electoral processes" and "appoint new National Electoral Council rectors without the consensus of all the political forces."

== Background ==
Since the 1999 Constituent Assembly elections, the National Assembly was dominated by alliances supportive of President Hugo Chávez. In the 2005 parliamentary elections, most opposition parties decided to withdraw, resulting in all seats being won by the Fifth Republic Movement and other parties supportive of Chávez. For the 2010 elections, an alliance of opposition parties was formed by the Democratic Unity Roundtable to contest the elections, and managed to win 64 seats. The PSUV, which was an alliance formed by Chávez from the Fifth Republic Movement and a number of smaller parties, won 96 seats, maintaining their majority, but lost their two-thirds and three-fifths supermajority. Fatherland for All, a small left-wing party, won two seats.

After Chávez's death in 2013, his hand-picked successor Maduro was narrowly elected president, continuing Chávez' ideological influence. In the 2015 parliamentary elections, the Democratic Unity Roundtable alliance gained a supermajority of 112 seats against 55 won by the GPP. In terms of popular vote, the MUD received 7.7 million votes, an increase of 2.4 million from the 2010 elections, becoming the most voted party in Venezuelan electoral history. The result was a decisive defeat for the PSUV and its wider alliance (GPP), which lost control of the Assembly for the first time since 1999.

In the midst of the ongoing constitutional crisis, a different body, the Constituent Assembly, was elected in 2017, with the intent of re-writing the Venezuelan Constitution. From that point forward, the two legislatures have operated in parallel, with the National Assembly forming the primary opposition to president Nicolás Maduro, and with the Constituent Assembly being his primary supporters. As of May 2019, the Constituent Assembly mandate is expected to expire on 31 December 2020, a measure that replaces the previous resolution of August 2017 that established its validity for at least two years.

In February 2018, Nicolás Maduro proposed holding the parliamentary elections alongside the presidential elections scheduled between April and May of that year. However, the proposal was later rejected by the National Electoral Council, which stated that holding both elections together would be too complicated. A year later, Maduro announced support, which was proposed by the Constituent Assembly, for an early election within 2019. During a speech at a pro-government rally celebrating the 20th anniversary of the revolution led by former President Hugo Chávez, He stated: "They [the opposition] want to bring forward elections, let's have elections."

In November 2019, Juan Guaidó and Stalin González, along with former rector of the National Electoral Council, Vicente Díaz, declared that the election would not solve the nationwide crisis. Guaidó said that the opposition would not participate in any discussion that did not contribute to the solution of the crisis.

On 7 March 2020 there was a fire in the National Electoral Council warehouses in Filas de Mariche, Caracas. Tibisay Lucena, president of the Council, announced the loss of 582 computers, 49 408 voting machines, 400 electronic ballots, 22 434 power inverters, 49 323 fingerprint scanners and 127 ballots that were due to be withdrawn. Andrés Caleca, former rector of the Electoral Council, assured that hardware-wise the Electoral Council "was in zero", and that the electoral infrastructure, the machines and fingerprint scanners, as well as the operative capacity to program the machines were lost in the fire.

In mid-2020, the opposition politicians Henrique Capriles and Stalin González encouraged participation in the elections. As a response, Juan Guaidó created a "unitary pact" along with the leaders of thirty-seven political parties, reaffirming to not participate in the elections and to summon a referendum in Venezuela. After meeting with Guaidó, the leader of the political party Vente Venezuela, María Corina Machado, rejected the proposal of a referendum, criticizing the incapacity of Guaidó to depose Maduro from power and stressing the importance of a military option. Elliott Abrams, the United States Special Representative for Venezuela, described María Corina's proposal as "surrealist". Capriles and González later withdrew from the electoral process to pressure better electoral conditions.

In September 2020, Maduro announced that military officers would look after voters in their homes to vote as part as a "biosecurity plan", and rejected the possibility of postponing the elections.

=== Supreme Tribunal of Justice chooses new Electoral Council ===
In October 2019, the National Assembly approved to start the appointment of the postulations committee of the new members of the National Electoral Council (CNE). In May 2020, the Committee of Electoral Candidacies, in charge of appointing a new National Electoral Council of Venezuela (CNE), announced that it would suspend its meetings because of the pandemic.

The Supreme Tribunal of Justice (TSJ), loyal to Nicolás Maduro, declared in June that the National Assembly had not named rectors for the CNE. The opposition denounced it as attempt to obstruct the procedure for the elections.

The TSJ decided on 12 June 2020 to name the electoral board that would oversee the parliamentary elections. Indira Alfonzo was declared as the new chief of the CNE through Facebook. Members of the National Assembly argue that the TSJ is not authorized to choose the board, according to the Venezuelan constitution. The Vice-President of the National Assembly, Juan Pablo Guanipa, declared “As Venezuelans we make our demand to the world for a free vote!”, calling Maduro's government a dictatorship. Juan Guaidó posted on Twitter "We haven’t given up our rights. They’ve got the game locked up and they’ve already started hanging up their phones. Don’t be fooled by their distractions.” According to Associated Press, moderate opponents of Maduro administration, trying to reach an agreement to create free elections, found the TSJ decision "disheartening".

Luis Vicente León from the Venezuelan poll firm Datanálisis, said that the TSJ selected two members from outside the United Socialist Party of Venezuela, in order to give the appearance of balance, but that this ultimately does not change anything, as the TSJ acted unilaterally, outside any political negotiation. León said “This will not generate any confidence that the opposition parties participated or lead to mass participation in an election. It only adds a brushstroke of opposition participation to a biased elections commission, amplifying the country’s division without solving the problem.”

=== Suspension of political parties directives ===
On 27 August 2019, the Supreme Court of Justice suspended the board of directors of the Copei to appoint a board of directors chaired by Miguel Salazar. Previously, the National Social Christian Assembly elected Mercedes Malavé on March 27, 2019.

In May, Tarek William Saab, the Attorney General appointed by the National Constituent Assembly, requested that the Supreme Tribunal of Justice declare Popular Will as a "terrorist organization," which would lead to the prohibition of the party. Popular Will rejected said accusations.

On 15 June, the Supreme Tribunal suspended the directive board of Democratic Action to appoint a new one presided by José Bernabé Gutiérrez, days after his brother José Luis Gutiérrez was appointed by the high court as rector of the National Electoral Council. The former was expelled from the party the following day.

On 17 June, the Supreme Tribunal proceeded to take the same measure with the Justice First party and appointed an ad hoc directive board presided by José Brito, who would be responsible for the appointment of the rest of the positions of Justice First, as well as the regional, municipal and local authorities.

On 7 July, the Supreme Tribunal also suspended the directive board of Popular Will, becoming the third political organization judicially intervened in the last month, appointing an ad hoc directive board presided by José Gregorio Noriega, previously expelled from the party. The high court sentenced that Noriega "could use the electoral card, logo, symbols, emblems, colors and any other own concept" of the party and suspended the expulsions of both Noriega as Guillermo Luces and Lucila Pacheco, members of the new board.

On 20 July, the Supreme Tribunal suspended the directive board of Republican Movement and appointed an ad hoc directive board presided by Manuel Rivas. The ad hoc board of directors of the party may use the electoral card, logo, symbols, emblems, colors and any other concept of the party.

On 18 August, the Supreme Tribunal additionally intervened in the far-left party Tupamaro, giving the party directive to an ad hoc board to use the seats, name, electoral card, symbols and electoral emblems of the party. The intervention took place after the party announced an electoral alliance without the United Socialist Party of Venezuela (PSUV). On 21 August, the Supreme Tribunal did the same with the left-wing party Fatherland for All, which also announced an electoral alliance without the PSUV; the high court also intervened in the Red Flag and Compromiso País parties, handing over the party to an ad hoc board.

After Henrique Capriles encouraged participation in the elections, the Supreme Tribunal reverted the intervention of the Justice First party, stripping the directive board from José Brito. Justice First ratified after the sentence that they would not participate in the elections.

=== Violence ===
On 10 August, colectivos took over with sticks, bottles and tear gas the two main seats in Caracas - in La Florida and in El Paraíso. At least four journalists were injured during the events.

After the Communist Party of Venezuela (PCV) announced their separation from the pro-government coalition Great Patriotic Pole, along with other parties such as Fatherland for All, and a new platform named "Revolutionary Popular Alternative," the PCV denounced the presence of Bolivarian Intelligence Service officials in their headquarters in Puerto Cabello, in Carabobo.

=== Opposition boycott ===
The opposition parties that make up the opposition coalition Democratic Unity Roundtable agreed unanimously to not participate in the election, citing irregularities complaints during the planning of the process and arguing that it was likely they would be fraudulent. Twenty-seven political parties signed the agreement, including the four largest opposition parties Popular Will, Justice First, Democratic Action and A New Era.

The parties that signed the document were: Acción Democrática, Alianza del Lápiz, Aprisal, Bandera Roja, Camina, Copei. Cuentas Claras, Encuentro Ciudadano, Fuerza Liberal, GuajiraVen, Izquierda Democrática, La Causa R, Moverse, Movimiento Republicano, NUVIPA, Parlinve, Movimiento por Venezuela, PDUPL, Primero Justicia, Proyecto Venezuela, Sociedad, Un Nuevo Tiempo, Unidad NOE, Unidos Para Venezuela, Vanguardia Popular, Voluntad Popular and Unidad Política Popular 89.

=== International position ===
The Lima Group, the International Contact Group, the European Union and the United States rejected holding parliamentary elections in 2020 "without free or fair conditions."

In a joint statement, the members of the Lima Group declared that they rejected and disavowed the appointment of the National Electoral Council members by the Supreme Tribunal of Justice, defining it as "illegal" and arguing that it "openly infringes the Venezuelan constitution and undermines the minimal necessary conditions for any electoral process and of the return of democracy in Venezuela."

The International Contact Group, headed by Uruguay, lamented the renovation of the Electoral Council that "undermines the credibility of the next electoral process." The public declarations was agreed by Bolivia, Costa Rica, Ecuador, Panama, the United Kingdom, the European Union and seven of its member states: France, Germany, Italy, the Netherlands, Portugal, Spain and Sweden.

The Organization of American States (OAS) rejected the "illegal" appointment of the Electoral Council and reminded that independent bodies are needed for "transparent, free and fair" elections to take place in the country.

The Office of the United Nations High Commissioner for Human Rights, headed by Michelle Bachelet, indicated that "the recent decisions of the Supreme Tribunal of Justice diminish the possibility to build conditions for democratic and credible electoral processes" and "appoint new National Electoral Council rectors without the consensus of all the political forces and interfere in the internal organization of two of the main opposition political parties."

The OAS Secretary General, Luis Almagro, and former Spanish Prime Minister Felipe González, condemned the violent takeover of the Democratic Action seats in Caracas.

In September, the European Union rejected Nicolás Maduro's invitation to send an observer mission to the electoral process, stressing that the ruling party had not met the "minimal conditions" for the process to be considered "credible and transparent".

==== Sanctions ====
The United States sanctioned Alfonzo and three others on 4 September 2020, accusing them of facilitating the illegitimate Maduro regime’s efforts to undermine the independence and democratic order of Venezuela. According to Treasury Secretary Steven Mnuchin, he said that "the corrupt Maduro regime is attempting to seize control of the National Assembly of Venezuela through a fraudulent election.” Alfonzo was already sanctioned by the Canadian government in May 2018, following the recent presidential election considered by Canada and part of the international community as "not free or fair."

=== Complaints ===
As of May 2020, during the COVID-19 pandemic, electoral organizations such as the Venezuelan Electoral Observatory and the Education Assembly Electoral Observation Network, assured that there were many obstacles in Venezuela left to surpass before an electoral process takes place by December 2020, including conditions, technological problems and a lack of agreement between political factions, saying that having the elections in 2020 did not appear feasible.

The former governor of the Kariña indigenous tribe, Wilson Espinoza, and member of the Guajira Rights Committee, José Marín, have protested against the Special Rules for the Election of Indigenous Deputies to the National Assembly (Spanish: Reglamento Especial para la Elección de los Diputados Indígenas a la Asamblea Nacional published on 24 July by the Electoral Council, arguing that it removed the direct vote to the indigenous minority, that it drastically reduced the indigenous representation in the National Assembly for the next elections and that it imposes a second degree vote to the group. On 26 July, in a public statement, Espinoza declared that the rules were redacted and published without consulting the electoral directory, without considering the suggestions and proposals of indigenous groups and warned that the thirty days term established by the rules for the process of community assemblies, spokespeople choice, general assemblies and vote by rising hand of the deputies that will represent them in the National Assembly is unreal and impossible to accomplish, as well as being a COVID-19 high contagion risk.

In July, the electoral non-governmental organizations Súmate and Voto Joven denounced that the biosecurity measures during the Electoral Registry update and registration process were deficient, including little or no equipment disinfection, such as fingerprint scanners or pens; incorrect use of face masks, lack of gloves and the social distancing non-compliance.

On 29 July, a group of former authorities of the extinct Supreme Electoral Council submitted an appeal to the Supreme Tribunal to ask for the suspension of the new changes approved by the Electoral Council. The requesters were Andrés Caleca, Eduardo Roche Lander, Ildemaro Martínez, Rafael Lander y Egleé González Lobato. Another group of former authorities of the National Electoral Council, jurists, politicians and experts submitted an appeal to the Supreme Tribunal asking for the suspension of the process, asking for time to organize it in a "reasonable and honorable" manner. The initiative was accompanied by the recollection of at least 8 000 signatures in the next few days.

On September, civil society organizations started the "Venezuela Documenta" (Venezuela Documents) platform to support citizens in the "reports and registries of incidents and patterns linked to the weakening of democracy, human rights, political participation and electoral processes in the country." The initiate is made of the Citizen Electoral Network, the Justice and Peace Center (Cepaz), the Communication and Democracy Global Observatory, Sinergy, Dale Letra and Diálogo Social.

== Campaign ==
In late October, the chief commander of Los Andes region, mayor general Ovidio Delgado Ramírez announced "a campaign to deliver firewood to the population".

During the final campaign, Diosdado Cabello declared: "He who does not vote, does not eat. For the one that does not vote there is no food. A quarantine is applied there." National Assembly deputy Delsa Solórzano announced that she would send the declaration to International Criminal Court. Cabello later declared that his statement was taken out of context, saying that "I said in Bolívar that if someone does not vote, the woman should tell the man that she will not give him food".

== Electoral system ==
Venezuela uses a parallel voting system, with 144 seats to be chosen by closed list proportional representation allocated using the d'Hondt method, and 133 seats to be chosen by plurality block voting in 87 geographical constituencies.

By decision of the National Electoral Council, Venezuela's electoral system replaced the international observation figure by a "convenient accompaniment".

On 5 June, the Supreme Tribunal "disapplied" Articles 14, 15, 174, 175, 176, 177, 178, 179, 180, 181, 182 and 186 of the Organic Law of Electoral Processes and modified the indigenous circumscription special mechanism.

=== Seats number ===
On 30 June, National Electoral Council president, Indira Alfonzo, announced the increase of the National Assembly by 110 seats more, for a total of 277 deputies. The move was interpreted as an attempt by Maduro to pack the assembly with supporters.

State	Deputy number		
State	List	Nominal	Total
Capital District	5	8	13
Amazonas	3	3	6
Anzoátegui	4	7	11
Apure	3	3	6
Aragua	5	7	12
Barinas	4	7	11
Bolívar	4	6	10
Carabobo	6	10	16
Cojedes	3	3	6
Delta Amacuro	3	3	6
Falcón	3	4	7
Guárico	3	4	7
Lara	5	8	13
Mérida	3	4	7
Miranda	8	11	19
Monagas	3	4	7
Nueva Esparta	3	3	6
Portuguesa	3	4	7
Sucre	4	3	7
Táchira	4	5	9
Trujillo	3	4	7
Vargas	3	3	6
Yaracuy	3	3	6
Zulia	10	15	25
National	48	—	48
Venezuela	144	133	277

=== Indigenous representation ===
Among the Electoral Law articles that will stop to be apply are the ones related to the conditions, requirements and ways in which the indigenous representatives will be elected for parliament. According to the Electoral Council, the disapplication has the objective to "reinvidicte the indigenous communities traditions, uses and practices." The new Electoral Council normative establishes a completely new electoral system, in which the personal and direct vote is replaced by a delegate system that will vote in the name of the indigenous communities, eliminating the first grade vote that has existed in previous electoral processes, with the exception of the 1999 Venezuelan Constituent Assembly election.

The Electoral Council established that the indigenous communities must organize in a body it called "community assemblies", which will meet and work pursuant to the schedule established by the Electoral Council. The meetings must also have the presence of an "electoral coordination agent" appointed by the Electoral Council that will be responsible for the documentation produced in the assemblies. The community assemblies have to choose for a yet undetermined number of spokespeople, which in turn will go to general assemblies in which they will proceed to choose their respective indigenous deputies, according to their region, representing their community in a second grade vote. The vote will take place on election day and with the presence of indigenous applicant organizations witnesses that assist to the act and the electoral coordinator appointed by the Electoral Council. The vote will be done "rising hands" and the votes will be reflected in an act that will afterwards be sent to the Regional Electoral Board and the Regional Electoral Office of the respective entity. The National Council will proceed to count every received acts; the candidate that receives the majority of the votes of the spokespeople will be elected as deputy.

The normative violates Articles 3 (vote personalization) and 16 (nominal vote right) of the Electoral Law, as well as Articles 5 (sovereignty exercised indirectly through the vote) and 63 (universal, direct and secret vote, and guaranty of vote personalization) of the constitution. The changes made by the Electoral Council also violate Article 298 of the constitution, which forbids modifying the Electoral Processes Law in the six months prior to the election. According to constitutionalist lawyer Juan Manuel Raffalli, the changes are illegal because they do not offer a direct and secret election as enshrined in the constitution.

== Opinion polls ==
Pollster	Date	PSUV	AD	PJ	VP	VV	MUD	UNT	COPEI	Other	Undecided	No party
Delphos	July 2020	22.9%	—N/a	—N/a	—N/a	—N/a	30.8%	—N/a	—N/a	19.3%	14.4%	12.6%
ICS	June 2020	35.1%	—N/a	—N/a	—N/a	—N/a	17.0% (Note: As "opposition and their allies".)	—N/a	—N/a	9.8%	38.1%	—N/a
Pronóstico	26 Aug–6 Sep 2019	13.9%	3.3%	5.1%	10.5%	5.0%	—N/a	0.4%	1.7%	0.2%	1.7%	58.0%
Pronóstico	6–15 Jun 2019	12.8%	4.0%	5.5%	10.9%	2.8%	—N/a	0.4%	1.9%	0.4%	1.2%	59.2%
Datanálisis	May 2019	11.1%	8.5%	3.2%	4.2%	0.8%	4.4%	2.0%	—N/a	2.0%	3.2%	59.2%
DatinCorp	17 Mar 2019	17.6%	8.2%	6.1%	7.0%	1.3%	—N/a	1.0%	—N/a	—N/a	—N/a	49.2%
Datanálisis	Mar 2018	18.1%	2.2%	0.9%	1.0%	0.2%	8.0%	1.8%	—N/a	1.4%	4.8%	60.1%

== Results ==
Amid a boycott by most opposition parties, the PSUV-led Great Patriotic Pole alliance won a supermajority of seats. Official sources reported voter turnout at approximately 30.5%. The opposition Democratic Unity Roundtable disputed this figure, estimating turnout at 16.1%.

Party or alliance		Party-list			Constituency			Total seats
Party or alliance		Votes	%	Seats	Votes	%	Seats	Total seats
Great Patriotic Pole	United Socialist Party of Venezuela	3,910,197	62.43	123	6,780,121	61.69	130	253
Great Patriotic Pole	Tupamaro (Note: Intervened)	99,747	1.59	0	175,232	1.59	0	0
Great Patriotic Pole	Fatherland for All	87,994	1.41	0	146,606	1.33	0	0
Great Patriotic Pole	Movement We Are Venezuela	66,500	1.06	0	114,178	1.04	0	0
Great Patriotic Pole	For Social Democracy	52,104	0.83	0	86,744	0.79	0	0
Great Patriotic Pole	People's Electoral Movement	33,316	0.53	0	57,724	0.53	0	0
Great Patriotic Pole	Alliance for Change	31,114	0.50	0	51,830	0.47	0	0
Great Patriotic Pole	Authentic Renewal Organization	21,408	0.34	0	38,434	0.35	0	0
Great Patriotic Pole	Venezuelan Popular Unity	19,595	0.31	0	30,402	0.28	0	0
Great Patriotic Pole	Total	4,321,975	69.01	123	7,481,271	68.07	130	253
Democratic Action		433,334	6.92	11	785,443	7.15	0	11
Esperanza por El Cambio		284,315	4.54	3	537,428	4.89	0	3
Democratic Alliance	Progressive Advance	156,248	2.49	3	332,727	3.03	0	3
Democratic Alliance	Ecological Movement of Venezuela	67,550	1.08	0	86,813	0.79	0	0
Democratic Alliance	Cambiemos Movimiento Ciudadano	52,588	0.84	0	99,043	0.90	0	0
Democratic Alliance	Total	276,386	4.41	3	518,583	4.72	0	3
United Venezuela	Venezuela First	187,264	2.99	2	311,628	2.84	0	2
United Venezuela	Popular Will	44,268	0.71	0	79,647	0.72	0	0
United Venezuela	United Venezuela	29,188	0.47	0	51,684	0.47	0	0
United Venezuela	Total	260,720	4.16	2	442,959	4.03	0	2
Copei		175,840	2.81	1	293,663	2.67	0	1
Communist Party of Venezuela		170,352	2.72	1	303,535	2.76	0	1
Solutions for Venezuela		99,649	1.59	0	187,988	1.71	0	0
Movement for Socialism		77,311	1.23	0	136,185	1.24	0	0
Union and Progress		53,197	0.85	0	95,962	0.87	0	0
ProCitizens		44,358	0.71	0	82,323	0.75	0	0
Popular Political Unit 89		19,179	0.31	0	37,197	0.34	0	0
New Vision for My Country		16,046	0.26	0	30,641	0.28	0	0
Organised Independent Party		7,327	0.12	0	13,341	0.12	0	0
Future Vision of Miranda		1,760	0.03	0	2,910	0.03	0	0
New Pact		1,721	0.03	0	3,097	0.03	0	0
Advanced Regional Movement		1,666	0.03	0	2,054	0.02	0	0
Revolucionario Independiente Organizado Social		1,624	0.03	0	2,982	0.03	0	0
Guayana Project		1,448	0.02	0	3,464	0.03	0	0
Neighborhood Force		1,427	0.02	0	2,575	0.02	0	0
Zuliana Action Party		1,366	0.02	0	1,797	0.02	0	0
Democratic Prosperity Movement		1,150	0.02	0	2,009	0.02	0	0
Socialist Renewal Movement		1,137	0.02	0	1,139	0.01	0	0
United Aragua		1,059	0.02	0	1,937	0.02	0	0
United Multi-Ethnic Peoples of Amazonas		1,045	0.02	0	3,143	0.03	0	0
Caracas for All		981	0.02	0	1,707	0.02	0	0
Aragua Democratic Platform		871	0.01	0	1,614	0.01	0	0
Carabobans for Carabobo		843	0.01	0	2,061	0.02	0	0
Sovereign Unity		792	0.01	0	1,562	0.01	0	0
Renovación En Democracia Nacimiento Alternativo		620	0.01	0	1,153	0.01	0	0
Play Fair		510	0.01	0	1,165	0.01	0	0
PAM		459	0.01	0	774	0.01	0	0
Everyone United for Amazonas		431	0.01	0	1,314	0.01	0	0
Orinoco-South		335	0.01	0	999	0.01	0	0
Independent Merideños Progressives		319	0.01	0	321	0.00	0	0
Independent Lara		307	0.00	0	952	0.01	0	0
New People Project		242	0.00	0	389	0.00	0	0
Allied Democrats of Free Expression		201	0.00	0	388	0.00	0	0
Change and Restructuring for Amazonas State		174	0.00	0	520	0.00	0	0
Independent People		149	0.00	0	155	0.00	0	0
Tinaquillo is First		140	0.00	0	243	0.00	0	0
Yacimiento Indigenista Venezolano Independiente		122	0.00	0	238	0.00	0	0
Sucre Awakens Liberation Movement					917	0.01	0	0
Indigenous seats								3
Total		6,262,888	100.00	144	10,990,098	100.00	130	277
Valid votes		6,262,888	99.29		6,233,249	98.82		
Invalid/blank votes		45,088	0.71		74,261	1.18		
Total votes		6,307,976	100.00		6,307,510	100.00		
Registered voters/turnout		20,710,421	30.46		20,710,421	30.46		
Source: CNE

== See also ==
- Operación Alacrán
- 2020 Venezuelan National Assembly Delegated Committee election
