= Endorsements in the 2024 Venezuelan presidential election =

Presidential elections were held in Venezuela on 28 July 2024 to choose a president for a six-year term beginning on 10 January 2025. President Nicolás Maduro ran for a third consecutive term, while former diplomat Edmundo González Urrutia represented the Unitary Platform (Spanish: Plataforma Unitaria Democrática; PUD), the main opposition political alliance.

The Unitary Platform held primaries in October 2023, which were won in a landslide by María Corina Machado. A few months earlier, in June 2023, she had been disqualified for fifteen years by the Comptroller General of Venezuela, but the decision was pending in court.

After she was barred from running, Machado's endorsement of González was an important factor in the election as he gained support from even former socialist supporters of the government, along with support from the Machado-led opposition.

A list of endorsements in the 2024 Venezuelan presidential election follows.

== Edmundo González ==
=== Executive officials ===
- Andrés Caleca – former president of the National Electoral Council
- Rodrigo Cabezas Morales – former Minister of Economy and Finance
- Héctor Navarro – former Minister of Education of Venezuela

=== Members of National Assembly ===
- Carlos Ocariz – former deputy to the National Assembly (2000–2006)
- Delsa Solórzano – former deputy of the National Assembly (2016–2021)
- Freddy Superlano – former deputy of the National Assembly (2016–2021)
- Henry Ramos Allup – former president of the National Assembly (2016–2017)
- Julio Borges, former president of the National Assembly (2017–2018)
- Juan Guaidó – former partially recognised president of Venezuela and of the National Assembly (2019–2023)
- Juan Pablo Guanipa – former deputy to the National Assembly (2011–2021)
- María Corina Machado – former deputy to the National Assembly (2011–2014) and former nominee for president of the Unitary Platform
- Omar Barboza – former president of the National Assembly (2018–2019)
- Tomás Guanipa – former deputy of the National Assembly (2011–2020)

=== Local officials ===
- Andrés Velásquez, former governor of Bolivar state (1989–1995)
- Antonio Ledezma – former Metropolitan Mayor of Caracas (2008–2015)
- César Pérez Vivas – former governor of Táchira state}(2008–2013)
- David Smolansky – former mayor of El Hatillo municipality (2013–2017)
- Oswaldo Álvarez Paz – former governor of Zulia state (1990–1993)
- Henrique Capriles – former governor of Miranda state (2008–2012, 2013–2017) and former nominee for president of the Democratic Unity Roundtable
- Henri Falcón – former governor of Lara state (2008–2017) and former candidate for president
- Henrique Salas Römer, former governor of Carabobo state (1990–1996)
- Leopoldo López – former mayor of Chacao municipality (2004–2008)
- Manuel Rosales – governor of Zulia state (2021–present)
- Sergio Garrido – governor of Barinas state (2022–2025)

=== Notable individuals ===
- Corina Yoris – former candidate for president of the Unitary Platform
- Fabiana Rosales – former partially recognised First Lady of Venezuela

=== Political parties ===
- Justice First
- Popular Will
- Democratic Action
- Come Venezuela
- Radical Cause
- Copei
- Encuentro Ciudadano
- National Convergence
- Red Flag (officially)
- Ecological Movement of Venezuela (de jure)
- Un Nuevo Tiempo
- Movimiento por Venezuela
- Movement to Socialism
- Democratic Republican Union
- Nueva Visión para mi País
- Movimiento Republicano (de jure)
- Movement for a Responsible, Sustainable and Entrepreneurial Venezuela
- Neighborhood Force (faction)
- Project Venezuela
- Fearless People's Alliance
- Organización Fuerza en Movimiento
- Cuentas Claras
- Gente Emergente
- Unión y Progreso
- Nueva Visión para mi País

=== International politicians ===
==== Heads of state and government ====
- Iván Duque – former President of Colombia (2018–2022)
- Jorge Quiroga – former President of Bolivia (2001–2002)
- Vicente Fox – former President of Mexico (2000–2006)

==== Foreign politicians ====
- Brian A. Nichols – american diplomat
- Carlos Gimenez – U.S. representative for Florida's 28th congressional district (since 2021)
- Evelyn Matthei – mayor of chilean commune Providencia (2016–2024)
- Felipe Kast – Member of the Senate of Chile (2018–present)
- José Manuel Edwards – Member of the Senate of Chile (2022–present)
- Jared Moskowitz – U.S. representative for Florida's 23rd congressional district (since 2023)
- Lindsey Graham – United States senator from South Carolina (since 2003)
- Marco Rubio – United States senator from Florida (2011–2025) and current United States Secretary of State (since 2025)
- Mariana Aylwin – former Member of the Chamber of Deputies of Chile (1994–1998)
- Maria Salazar – U.S. representative for Florida's 27th congressional district
- Rodrigo Galilea – Member of the Senate of Chile (since 2018)
- Ximena Rincón – Member of the Senate of Chile (since 2018)

== Nicolás Maduro ==
=== Executive officials ===
- Delcy Rodriguez – incumbent Vice President of Venezuela (2018–present)
- Elías Jaua – former Vice President of Venezuela (2012–2013)
- Jorge Arreaza – former Vice President of Venezuela (2013–2016)

=== Ministers ===
- José David Cabello – incumbent Director of SENIAT (2008–present)
- Yván Gil – incumbent Minister of Foreign Affairs (2023–present)

=== Members of National Assembly ===
- Carlos Prosperi – former Deputy to the National Assembly (2016–2021)
- Cilia Flores – deputy of the National Assembly (since 2021) and first lady of Venezuela
- Diosdado Cabello – deputy of the National Assembly (since 2011) and Secretary-General of United Socialist Party of Venezuela
- Didalco Bolívar – deputy of the National Assembly (since 2021)
- Iris Varela – deputy of the National Assembly (since 2021)
- Jorge Rodríguez – president of the National Assembly (since 2021)
- Nicolás Maduro Guerra, deputy of the National Assembly (since 2021) and son of president Nicolás Maduro
- Tania Díaz – deputy of the National Assembly (since 2012)

=== Local officials ===
- Adán Chávez – former governor of Barinas state (2008–2016) and brother of Hugo Chávez.
- Alberto Galindez – governor of Cojedes state (since 2021)
- Carmen Meléndez – former governor of Lara state (2017–2020) and Mayor of Libertator Municipality of Caracas (since 2021)
- Erika Farías – former mayor of Libertator Municipality of Caracas (2017-2021)
- Freddy Bernal – governor of Táchira state (since 2021)
- Héctor Rodríguez Castro – governor of Miranda state (since 2021)
- Juan Carlos Zamora – mayor of Tinaco municipality (since 2021)
- Morel Rodríguez – governor of Nueva Esparta state (since 2021)
- Rafael Lacava – governor of Carabobo state (since 2017)

=== Political parties ===
- United Socialist Party of Venezuela
- Communist Party of Venezuela (faction)
- Venezuelan Popular Unity
- Patria Para Todos
- For Social Democracy
- Movimiento Revolucionario Tupamaro
- We Are Venezuela Movement
- People's Electoral Movement
- Authentic Renewal Organization
- Alliance for Change

=== Individuals ===
- Alex Saab – colombian-venezuelan businessman.
- Henrys Silva – venezuelan singer
- Roger Waters – english singer and cofounder of Pink Floyd

=== International politicians ===
==== Head of state and government ====
- Daniel Ortega – incumbent President of Nicaragua (since 2007)
- Evo Morales – former President of Bolivia (2006–2019)
- Miguel Díaz-Canel – incumbent President of Cuba (since 2019)
- Rosario Murillo – incumbent Vicepresident of Nicaragua (since 2017)

==== Party officials ====
- Eduardo Artés – chilean educator and General Secretary of Chilean Communist Party (Proletarian Action) (since 1979)

== Others ==
Luis Eduardo Martínez was endorsed by Juan Carlos Alvarado, Deputy to the National Assembly; Luis Ratti, former independent candidate for president; and the political parties Democratic Action (minority faction), COPEI (minority faction) and Red Flag (minority faction).

Antonio Ecarri was endorsed by political parties Neighborhood Force (partial); Alianza del Lápiz; Progressive Advance (intervened by the National Electoral Council); and Cambiemos Movimiento Ciudadano.

Enrique Márquez was endorsed by the Communist Party of Venezuela and the Networks Party.
