= Interventions of political parties in Venezuela =

Several interventions of political parties in Venezuela have occurred during Nicolás Maduro's government. The interventions are mandated by the pro-government Venezuelan Supreme Tribunal of Justice (TSJ by its initials in Spanish). During these interventions, the leadership or most of the political party members end up suspended, expelled or replaced by members appointed by the TSJ.

The interventions have replaced the directive boards of historically important Venezuelan political parties like Copei and Democratic Action who have opposed Chavismo, but also interventions have been acted on some pro-Chavismo leaning parties like the Communist Party of Venezuela (PCV).

== History ==
=== Background ===
On May 15, 2013, when an ad hoc board led by Pedro Celestino Veliz was appointed as leader of the Red Flag Party, ignoring an internal party assembly in which Gabriel Puerta Aponte he was re-elected as secretary general In 2014, the old leadership was restored. In 2015, the rights on the electoral symbol was given to Pedro Veliz Acuña.

On 27 August 2019, the TSJ suspended the board of directors of the Copei to appoint a board of directors chaired by Miguel Salazar. Previously, the National Social Christian Assembly elected Mercedes Malavé on March 27, 2019.

In May 2020, Tarek William Saab, the Attorney General appointed by the National Constituent Assembly, requested that the TSJ declare Popular Will as a "terrorist organization," which would lead to the prohibition of the party. Popular Will rejected said accusations.

=== 2015 parliamentary election ===
On July 17, 2015, the TSJ dismissed the national board of the People's Electoral Movement, replacing the then Secretary General Wilmer Nolasco with Gilberto Jesús Jiménez Prieto. As a result of this fact, part of the militancy of the MEP decides to carry out the initiative that they called "MEP-Originario", splitting from the MEP appointed by the TSJ. In May 2017, they participated in the process of renewing the political parties of the National Electoral Council; however, the MEP was not re-legitimized.

Prior to the 2015 Venezuelan parliamentary election, the pro-government TSJ designated new leaders of COPEI, leading some to state that the party was infiltrated by the PSUV. By 2017, Caracas Chronicles said the party was "dying an undignified death" as infighting among leaders could not agree on a path for the party. Similar happened to the Ecological Movement of Venezuela.

Symbols of Democratic Unity Roundtable (left) and National Integrity Movement-Unity (right). A variation of the MUD symbol includes a small MUD label in the top left-hand corner.

On August 6, 2015 the TSJ issues and executes a judicial decision by which it suspends the National Directorate that existed before the measure and replaced by a new directive. The president of MIN-Barinas filed a lawsuit against the directive headed by Manuel Pérez Soto accused of disregarding regulations and the organs of the party. The Constitutional Chamber would appoint "an ad hoc board headed by Luz María Álvarez, Ramón Eduardo Odremán and the complainant himself as directors." The Democratic Unity Roundtable (MUD) opposition coalition, of which MIN Unidad was a member, unanimously decided to suspend the party as a member of the referred coalition. In the 2015 parliamentary elections, the party was suspended.

For the 2015 parliamentary elections, the MIN was the subject of controversy for, among other things, running Chavista candidates, having as slogan "We are the opposition" and highlighting the word "Unity", which was also highlighted by the then Democratic Unity Roundtable main opposition coalition. The party even ran a candidate in the state of Aragua with the same name as the MUD candidate.

Likewise, the then president of the party appointed by the TSJ, Luz María Álvarez assured that the nomination of William Ojeda for the 2015 parliamentary elections was apparently the following: "The decision of the Supreme Court of Justice (TSJ), with barely 12 hours before the closing of the presentation of nominations, forced us to make alliances with other organizations and William Ojeda 'snuck' in. When we made the corresponding claim and demanded his withdrawal, the factor that presented him threatened to withdraw all the candidates in that entity. That would have left us at a disadvantage because, with the withdrawal of Miranda, we would no longer be a national party. So we had to accept that contingency. We had to get the guy on board".

=== 2020 parliamentary election ===
On 15 June 2020, the TSJ suspended the directive board of Democratic Action to appoint a new one presided by José Bernabé Gutiérrez, days after his brother José Luis Gutiérrez was appointed by the high court as rector of the National Electoral Council. The former was expelled from the party the following day.

On 17 June, the TSJ proceeded to take the same measure with the Justice First party and appointed an ad hoc directive board presided by José Brito, who would be responsible for the appointment of the rest of the positions of Justice First, as well as the regional, municipal and local authorities.

On 7 July, the TSJ also suspended the directive board of Popular Will, becoming the third political organization judicially intervened in the last month, appointing an ad hoc directive board presided by José Gregorio Noriega, previously expelled from the party. The high court sentenced that Noriega "could use the electoral card, logo, symbols, emblems, colors and any other own concept" of the party and suspended the expulsions of both Noriega as Guillermo Luces and Lucila Pacheco, members of the new board.

On 20 July, the TSJ suspended the directive board of Republican Movement and appointed an ad hoc directive board presided by Manuel Rivas. The ad hoc board of directors of the party may use the electoral card, logo, symbols, emblems, colors and any other concept of the party.

On 18 August, the TSJ additionally intervened in the far-left party Tupamaro, giving the party directive to an ad hoc board to use the seats, name, electoral card, symbols and electoral emblems of the party. The intervention took place after the party announced an electoral alliance without the United Socialist Party of Venezuela (PSUV). On 21 August, the TSJ did the same with the left-wing party Fatherland for All, which also announced an electoral alliance without the PSUV by dissolving the board of directors headed by Rafael Uzcátegui and replacing it with one headed by Medina.; the high court also intervened in the Red Flag and Compromiso País parties, handing over the party to an ad hoc board. On 22 August, New Vision of my Country (NUVIPA) got a new leadership appointed by the TSJ.

Symbols of Justice First (left) and Venezuela First (right)

After Henrique Capriles encouraged participation in the elections, the TSJ reverted the intervention of the Justice First party, stripping the directive board from José Brito. Justice First ratified after the sentence that they would not participate in the elections. Soon after, Venezuela First was founded by members who took the party over after the intervention, which uses a similar logo and name to Justice First and ran in the election.

=== After the election ===
In March 2022, the leadership of Progressive Advance was disputed between Luis Augusto Romero, who claimed the highest authority of the organization, and Henri Falcón who was ratified president of the party in an assembly not recognized by the National Electoral Council, said assembly was declared null and void by the National Electoral Council, a body that recognized the National Executive Committee as the sole authority of AP, while Falcón announced the creation of a new movement, called "Futuro", composed mainly of former progressives, thus ceasing the internal dispute which joined the opposition Unitary Platform.

=== 2024 presidential election ===
In August 2023, the TSJ intervened the directive board of the Communist Party of Venezuela (PCV), appointing a new ad hoc board with Henry Parra as president and Sixto Rodríguez as general secretary to "democratize" the party. Parra and Rodríguez have been linked to the ruling PSUV, and the PCV joined the list of parties intervened for political reasons by the questioned Venezuelan judiciary, along with several parties of the so-called dissident Chavismo and of the traditional opposition itself.

== See also ==
- Co-option
- Operación Alacrán
- Democratic Alliance (Venezuela)
- Bloc party
