= Democratic Alliance (Venezuela) =

Former political coalition in Venezuela

Democratic Alliance Alianza Democrática
- Abbreviation: AD
- Leaders: Javier Bertucci (El Cambio); José Bernabé Gutiérrez (AD); Juan Carlos Alvarado (Copei); Timoteo Zambrano (CMC); Henri Falcón (AP); Luis Parra (PV)
- Founded: 4 September 2020; 2025 (second)
- Dissolved: August 2023; 16 June 2025 (second)
- Split from: Democratic Unity Roundtable
- Preceded by: Agreement for Change
- Ideology: Liberal democracy Factions: Christian democracy Social democracy Social liberalism Progressivism; Economic liberalism
- Political position: Big tent
- Slogan: La Unidad Superior por Venezuela ('The Superior Unity for Venezuela')

Website
- Twitter page

The Democratic Alliance (Spanish: Alianza Democrática, AD) is a parliamentary group and a former political coalition created to face the government of Nicolás Maduro in the 2020 Venezuelan parliamentary election and grouped in the National Assembly. It is made up of Hope for Change, Cambiemos and Progressive Advance parties of the predecessor coalition Agreement for Change, in addition to the intervened parties Democratic Action and Copei, and the later incorporated Primero Venezuela, United Venezuela, Ecological Movement, Unidad Vision Venezuela, Country Commitment and the also intervened Popular Will.

AD was the successor coalition of the Agreement for Change, and later also of the United Venezuela Alliance.

== History ==
=== Creation and origin ===
On 4 September 2020, representatives of five political parties of the Venezuelan opposition met with the CNE to formalize the nominations of candidates for the questioned parliamentary elections that will be held on 6 December 2020. The coalition was called the Democratic Alliance, whose main characteristic is that the directives of the main opposition parties (AD, VP, COPEI) were changed via the Supreme Court, after a document was introduced in the judicial body requesting the creation of a new ad-hoc board of directors and thus their electoral cards will be enabled to participate in the elections.

On 8 September 2020, in a ceremony held with the presence of national and international media, Javier Bertucci, president of the El Cambio party, announced a new unit called "Democratic Alliance" to participate in the controversial 2020 parliamentary elections. The alliance had the purpose of achieving the departure of the Maduro government with an "electoral, democratic and constitutional" route, through active participation in the upcoming elections (governors and mayors), and then call a recall referendum.

=== Political actions ===
Juan Carlos Alvarado, general secretary of Copei, said that the alliance nominated candidates in the 2020 parliamentary election in the 24 state lists and 87 electoral districts of the country. He mentioned that said alliance has a structure to defend the vote in the 14,509 voting centers and the more than 35,000 polling stations enabled for the elections to be held on 6 December 2020.

The Ecological Movement joined the Democratic Alliance in some states such as Amazonas, Cojedes, Delta Amacuro, Lara, Mérida, Miranda, Nueva Esparta, Táchira, Trujillo, Vargas and Zulia.

On December 9, the CNE published on its official website the bulletin that awards the 274 deputies by voting National, Regional and Nominal Lists. The coalition obtained the majority of the opposition votes, obtaining 1,169,363, representing 18.76% of the total participation.

Subsequently, the dissident parties of Primero Venezuela of the deputies Luis Parra and José Brito, United Venezuela of the alternate deputy Chaim Bucarán and the judicially intervened party Popular Will of the also alternate José Gregorio Noriega were incorporated.

== Composition ==
The Alliance was made up of 27 political parties, mentioned below:

| Party | Abbr. | Ideology | Position | Leader | National Assembly |
|---|---|---|---|---|---|
| Democratic Action; Acción Democrática (intervened) | AD | Social democracy Venezuelan nationalism | Centre-left | José Bernabé Gutiérrez | 8 / 277 |
| Hope for Change; Esperanza por El Cambio | El Cambio | Christian democracy | Centre | Javier Bertucci | 4 / 277 |
| COPEI; Comité de Organización Política Electoral Independiente (intervened) | COPEI | Social conservatism Christian democracy Economic liberalism | Centre to centre-right | Juan Carlos Alvarado | 3 / 277 |
| Progressive Advance; Avanzada Progresista | AP | Social democracy Progressivism | Centre-left | Henri Falcon | 2 / 277 |
| Venezuela First; Primero Venezuela | PV | Humanism | Centre-left | Luis Parra | 2 / 277 |
| Let's Change - Citizen's Movement; Cambiemos Movimiento Ciudadano | CMC | Pluralism; Progressivism; Feminism | Centre-left | Timoteo Zambrano | 1 / 277 |
| Popular Will; Voluntad Popular (intervened) | VP | Social democracy; Progressivism; Economic liberalism | Centre to centre-left | José Gregorio Noriega | 0 / 277 |
| United Venezuela; Venezuela Unida | VU | Social democracy | Centre-left | | 0 / 277 |
| Ecological Movement of Venezuela; Movimiento Ecológico de Venezuela (intervened) | MOVEV | Green politics Environmentalism | Centre to centre-left | Alejandro Aguilera | 0 / 277 |
| Unity Vision Venezuela; Unidad Visión Venezuela | UVV | Liberalism; Modern liberalism | Centre | Omar Ávila | 0 / 277 |
| Country Commitment; Compromiso País | COMPA | Social democracy Liberal humanism | Centre to centre-left | Olga Morey | 0 / 277 |
| Movement for Socialism; Movimiento al Socialismo | MAS | Democratic socialism Market socialism Social democracy Progressivism | Centre-left to left-wing | Felipe Mujica | 0 / 277 |
| Republican Movement; Movimiento Republicano (intervened) | MR | Republicanism | Centre | | 0 / 277 |
| Procitizens; Prociudadanos | PRO | Liberalism | Centre-right | Leocenis García | 0 / 277 |
| Solutions for Venezuela; Soluciones para Venezuela | SPV | Social democracy Pluralism; Third way Patriotism; Populism | Centre-left | Claudio Fermín | 0 / 277 |
| New Vision for my Country; Nueva Visión para mi País (intervened) | NUVIPA | Christian nationalism | Centre | | 0 / 277 |
| Red Flag; Bandera Roja (intervened) | BR | Communism; Marxism–Leninism; Anti-Chavismo; Hoxhaism; Anti-revisionism | Left-wing to far-left | | 0 / 277 |
| Popular Political Unity 89; Unidad Política Popular 89 | UPP 89 | Chavismo | Left-wing | Reinaldo Quijada | 0 / 277 |
| National Opinion; Opinión Nacional | OPINA | Conservatism; Liberalism; Liberal conservatism Federalism; Republicanism | Right-wing | José Antonio Araújo | 0 / 277 |
| National Integrity Movement-Unity; Movimiento de Integridad Nacional-Unidad (intervened) | MIN-Unidad | Patriotism; Meritocracy; Pragmatism; Social conservatism Economic liberalism Agrarianism | Right-wing | | 0 / 277 |
| Social Progress; Progreso Social | PS | Nationalism | Centre | | 0 / 277 |
| Democratic Center Party; Partido Centro Democrático | PCD | Christian humanism | Centre | | 0 / 277 |
| Networks Party; Partido Redes | REDES | Socialism; Libertarian socialism Chavismo; Bolivarianism; Pluralism | Left-wing to far-left | Juan Barreto | 0 / 277 |
| Indigenous Peoples Movement; Movimiento de los Pueblos Indígenas | MOPIVE | Indigenismo | Big tent | | 0 / 277 |
| Centre Alliance; Alianza Centro | AC | Moderate Chavismo | Centre | | 0 / 277 |
| Building Country; Construyendo País | CP | Big tent | | | 0 / 277 |
| Go Ahead; Va Pa´lante | VPL | Progressivism | Centre-left | | 0 / 277 |

== Electoral results ==
=== Parliamentary elections ===
| Election | Votes | % | Seats | +/– | Rank | Government |
|---|---|---|---|---|---|---|
| 2020 | 1,101,816 | 17.68 | 18 / 277 | ▼91 (Note: Compared to the results of the MUD in 2015) | ▼2nd | Opposition |
| 2025 | 361,769 | 6.02 | 13 / 285 | ▼7 (Note: Including other parties which joined after the 2020 election) | 2nd | Opposition |

== See also ==
- Operación Alacrán
- Interventions of political parties in Venezuela
