= José Guerra (economist) =

Venezuelan economist, writer and politician (born 1956)

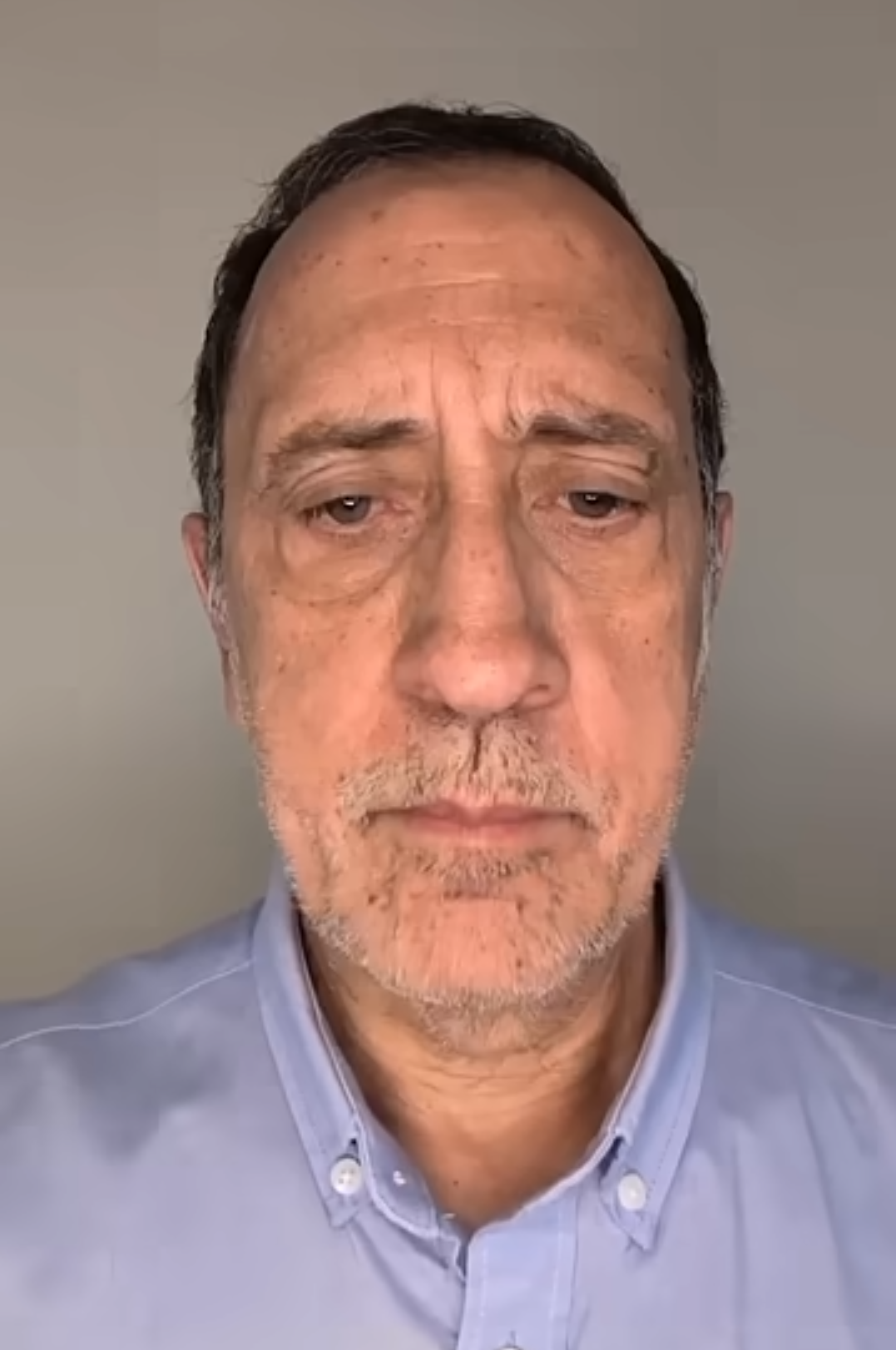
- In a 2025 video

Deputy of the National Assembly for the Capital District
- In office 5 January 2016 – 5 January 2021

Personal details
- Born: José Ángel Guerra Brito; 7 September 1956 (age 69) Arismendi, Sucre, Venezuela
- Party: Independent
- Education: Central University of Venezuela (BEc); University of Illinois Urbana-Champaign (MEc)

José Ángel Guerra Brito (born 7 September 1956) is a Venezuelan economist, writer and politician who served as a deputy of the National Assembly of Venezuela from 2016 to 2021. He previously served as a professor of economics and politics and for his career at the Central Bank of Venezuela. Guerra also was an advisor to Henrique Capriles in his presidential campaigns of 2012 and 2013 and was Coordinator of the Economic Area of the Democratic Unity Roundtable (MUD).

== Career ==
He is an economist graduated from the Central University of Venezuela (UCV), with a Specialization in Economics from the Economics Institute of the University of Colorado and a Master's in Economics from the University of Illinois at Urbana–Champaign.

He was Manager of Economic Research of the Central Bank of Venezuela and a professor at the School of Economics of the UCV where he teaches Theory and Monetary Policy and Economic Problems of Venezuela.

In 1995 and 1996, respectively, he co-authored the works that won the Ernesto Peltzer National Economy Prize awarded by the BCV. He has published or edited, among others, the following books: Studies on inflation in Venezuela (BCV 2000), Foreign exchange policy issues in Venezuela (BCV 2004) and Economic policy in Venezuela 1999–2003, (UCV 2004). He is a columnist at El Universal and the weekly Descifrado.

=== Political career ===
He was an economic advisor to Henrique Capriles Radonski, a unitary candidate for the Bureau of the Democratic Unit, during the presidential campaigns of 2012 and 2013. He was National Coordinator for Economic Matters of the Bureau of the Democratic Unit, a position he left to run as an independent candidate, with the support of the Justice First party, to the National Assembly by Circumscription 4 of Caracas.

In the 2015 Venezuelan parliamentary election, he was elected Deputy for Circumscription 4 which includes the parishes: El Valle, Coche, Santa Rosalía.

In an interview on the labor issue in Venezuela during the Hugo Chávez administration, he states:

One of the problems that the government's economic and incentive policy scheme had through the missions was that people stayed at home and did not look for work, it was easier to get a government stipend than to go out to look work ... and get ready for work.

In January 2017, while Guerra is a deputy, a new president of the Central Bank of Venezuela (BCV) is appointed on what he said:

[Ricardo] Sanguino is a person who has no notions of what a Central Bank is. He is an economist graduated in the 60s where modern things in the economy; monetary theory, fiscal theory; they were not developed ... he is a man who has never dedicated himself to the economy itself. Get yourself! On Google a Sanguino writing ... a book, a papper or an article related to the economy ... a 140-character tweet, you won't find it ... he has an archaic vision of what inflation is, he believes that inflation is that some types sell expensive ... he has an aversion to the financial system, he is not a man of dialogue with the financial sector ... what we are going to see is Good financing ... flooding the economy of worthless bills. Sanguino could do that work of reason ... to finish purging, according to them the most technical elements, what they call neoliberal.

On 28 August 2019, José Guerra maintains the following regarding the economic sanctions of the United States government on Venezuela:

The measures were taken on Friday, but the situation in Venezuela was already very precarious before the measures. So what we are living now have nothing to do with the measures ... the main impact of the measure is that new debt cannot be placed in the United States or with companies in the United States; What hinders the financing of PDVSA ... the problem is that given the macroeconomic conditions of Venezuela and given the risk country Venezuela does not have access to world markets ... it is not that the country is blocked is that domestic economic policies led to country this isolation and confinement this has nothing to do with the Assembly [National] to block the government, is a self – locking is a self inflicted by an erratic economic policies harm.

In November 2019, Guerra denounced a strategy to "bribe" opposition lawmakers in what he called "Maletín Verde" (English: Green Suitcase), with the aim of breaking the qualified majority that the opposition had in the National Assembly.
