= Esperanza por El Cambio =

Venezuelan political party

Hope for Change Esperanza por El Cambio
- President: Javier Bertucci
- General Secretary: Alfonso Campos
- Coordinator: Jeickson Portillo
- Undersecretary: Luis Adames
- Founded: February 28, 2018
- Headquarters: Valencia, Venezuela
- Ideology: Christian democracy
- Political position: Centre
- National affiliation: Democratic Alliance
- National Assembly: 1 / 285
- Governors: 0 / 23
- Mayors: 0 / 335

Website
- www.partidoelcambio.org

Esperanza por el Cambio (English: Hope for Change) is a Venezuelan political party registered by the National Electoral Council (CNE) with the shortened name El Cambio (Change). In the 2018 presidential election, Venezuelan pastor and party leader Javier Bertucci received enough votes to turn Hope for Change into an official political party. Aside from Bertucci, other leaders of the party include Alfonso Campos, the party's Secretary-General, Jeickson Portillo, its National Coordinator, and Luis Adames, its Undersecretary.

== History ==
On 21 February 2018, Javier Bertucci, an evangelical pastor who founded the Christian organization El Evangelio Cambia, announced his candidacy in the 2018 Venezuelan presidential election. Bertucci renounced his pastorship in compliance with Venezuelan electoral regulations, which state that presidential candidates must not be affiliated with any religious organizations. Early support for his campaign came from people who had previously known him due to his pastorship and establishment of the "Maranatha Venezuela" church. On 28 February, a group of his supporters registered the Hope for Change (Spanish: Esperanza por El Cambio) political party with the CNE to help draw further support for his candidacy. To gain further support among the poor, Hope for Change held soup kitchens, claiming that people wouldn't listen to speeches if they were starving.

On 21 September 2018, Alfonso Campos, the General Secretary of Hope for Change, announced that the party was running municipal election candidates in 335 municipalities, in addition to confirming a national tour by Javier Bertucci. On 6 October, Hope for Change announced that it had formed an alliance with COPEI, MAS, AP, CMC, and MOVEV. At a press conference in Caracas on 22 November, Bertucci announced that Hope for Change was running 4,430 candidates in the municipal elections.

Bertucci received 1,015,895 votes in the presidential election, over 10% of the total votes, placing behind the incumbent Nicolás Maduro and Progressive Advance candidate Henri Falcón. The Hope for Change candidate for the municipal election in the state of Bolívar won their election.
