= Juan Carlos Alvarado (politician) =

Venezuelan politician (born 1981)

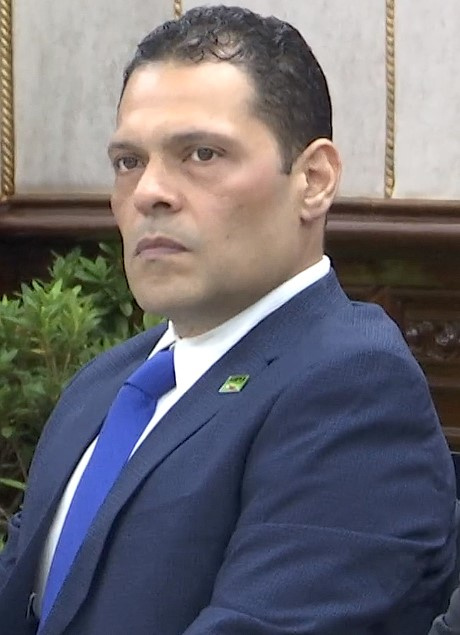
- Alvarado in 2022

Deputy of the National Assembly for Miranda State
- Incumbent
- Assumed office 5 January 2021

Personal details
- Born: Juan Carlos Alvarado Prato; 12 November 1981 (age 44) Venezuela
- Party: Copei
- Profession: Politician

Juan Carlos Alvarado Prato (born 12 November 1981) is a Venezuelan politician who is Secretary-General of Copei since 2019, imposed by the Supreme Tribunal of Justice, and a member of the National Assembly since 2021.

== See also ==
- V National Assembly of Venezuela
- Interventions of political parties in Venezuela
