= Simón Rodríguez Municipality =

Simón Rodríguez Municipality Municipio Simón Rodríguez
- Municipality
- Flag Coat of arms

- Location in Anzoátegui

- Location in Venezuela
- Coordinates: 8°46′40″N 64°10′16″W
- Country: Venezuela
- State: Anzoátegui
- Municipal seat: El Tigre

Government
  - Mayor: Alberto Gago Betancourt (PSUV)

Area
  - Total: 712.8 km^{2} (275.2 sq mi)

Population (2015)
  - Total: 236.566
  - Density: 0.3319/km^{2} (0.8596/sq mi)
- Time zone: UTC−4 (VET)
- Area code(s): 0283

The Simón Rodríguez Municipality is one of the 21 municipalities (municipios) that makes up the eastern Venezuelan state of Anzoátegui and, according to the 2011 census by the National Institute of Statistics of Venezuela, the municipality has a population of 182,474. The town of El Tigre is the shire town of the Simón Rodríguez Municipality.

== History ==
El Tigre was founded on February 23, 1933. The city started when oil companies found oil in El Tigre and established their offices in Campo Oficina.

== Demographics ==
The Simón Rodríguez Municipality, according to a 2007 population estimate by the National Institute of Statistics of Venezuela, has a population of 183,185 (up from 155,178 in 2000). This amounts to 12.4% of the state's population. The municipality's population density is 260.58 inhabitants per square kilometre (674.9/sq mi).

== Government ==
The mayor of the Simón Rodríguez Municipality is Carlos Hernández, elected on November 23, 2008, with 49% of the vote. He replaced Ernesto José Paraqueima Luiggi shortly after the elections. The municipality is divided into two parishes; Edmundo Barrios and Miguel Otero Silva.

== See also ==
- El Tigre
- Anzoátegui
- Municipalities of Venezuela
