= Venezuela First =

Political party in Venezuela

Venezuela First Primero Venezuela
- Abbreviation: PV
- Leader: Luis Parra
- President: Génesis Sabrina Ramírez
- General Secretary: Miguel Ponente Parra
- Founder: Luis Parra
- Founded: 4 September 2020; 6 years ago
- Split from: Justice First; Democratic Unity Roundtable
- Preceded by: Acción Ciudadana en Positivo
- Ideology: Humanism; Liberal democracy
- Political position: Centre
- National affiliation: Democratic Alliance (2020–2023)
- Colours: Gold; Black
- National Assembly: 2 / 285
- Governors: 0 / 23
- Mayors: 1 / 335

Website
- Twitter page

Venezuela First (Spanish: Primero Venezuela; PV) is a Venezuelan political party led by former members of the opposition coalition Democratic Unity Roundtable.

== History ==
=== Origins ===
It is made up of a split of militants expelled from the Primero Justicia (PJ) party and other political groups, who took control of it as a result of an intervention order from the Supreme Court of Justice months before the 2020 parliamentary election.

The majority of deputies of the IV legislature of Parliament who deserted the ranks of the Democratic Unity Roundtable, after being accused of the corruption and vote-buying scandal, known by various media as Operación Alacrán, focused on this training.

Together with the ad hoc directorate of Popular Will and the United Venezuela party, they founded the Alianza Venezuela Unida coalition.

=== 2020 parliamentary election ===
For the 2020 parliamentary elections, Primero Venezuela obtains two deputies.

On the other hand, in these elections Luis Parra did not receive enough votes to be assigned a seat on the Yaracuy regional list, where he was registered. In response, the CNE replaced the seat it had previously announced on the national list for José Gregorio Noriega with that of Luis Parra. This situation was denounced by David García, then leader of Primero Venezuela, who in a public letter stated that "Luis Parra silently obtained a seat that did not correspond to him" and announced his resignation from this party. Similarly, Primero Venezuela expels David García for "not having provided the logistics resources and support that the alliance team would have to take care of the organization's votes" and they assured that García "is breathing through the wound, for not having been elected deputy and setting himself up as Rector of the CNE, points out who is elected and who is not, committing crimes of simulation of punishable acts, irresponsibly pointing to high public officials».

SIts deputies later joined the Democratic Alliance faction.

== Electoral results ==
=== Parliamentary elections ===
Year	Votes	%	Deputies	+/-
2020	187,264	3.00%	2 / 277	▲2

=== Regional elections ===
Year	Votes	%	Governors	+/-	Mayors	+/-	Councillors	+/-
2021	86.449	1,08%	0 / 23	0	1 / 335	▲1		

== See also ==
- Justice First
- Operación Alacrán
