= Operación Alacrán =

Venezuelan corruption plot

- Operación Maletín Verde; Part of Crisis in Venezuela and the Venezuelan presidential crisis
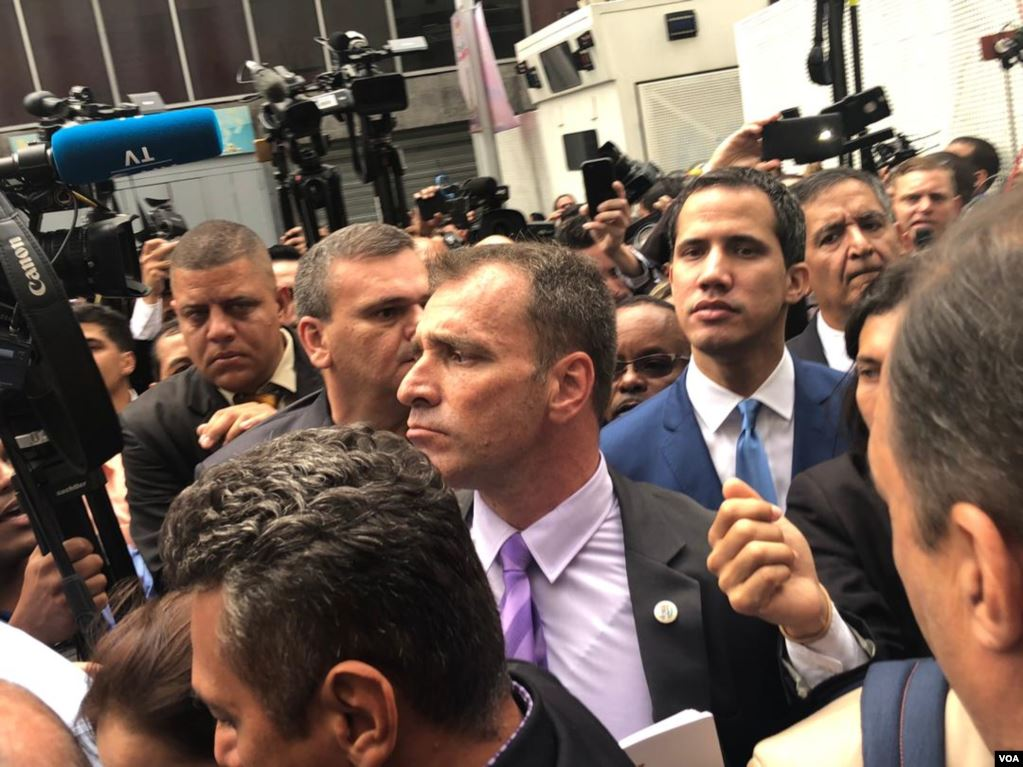
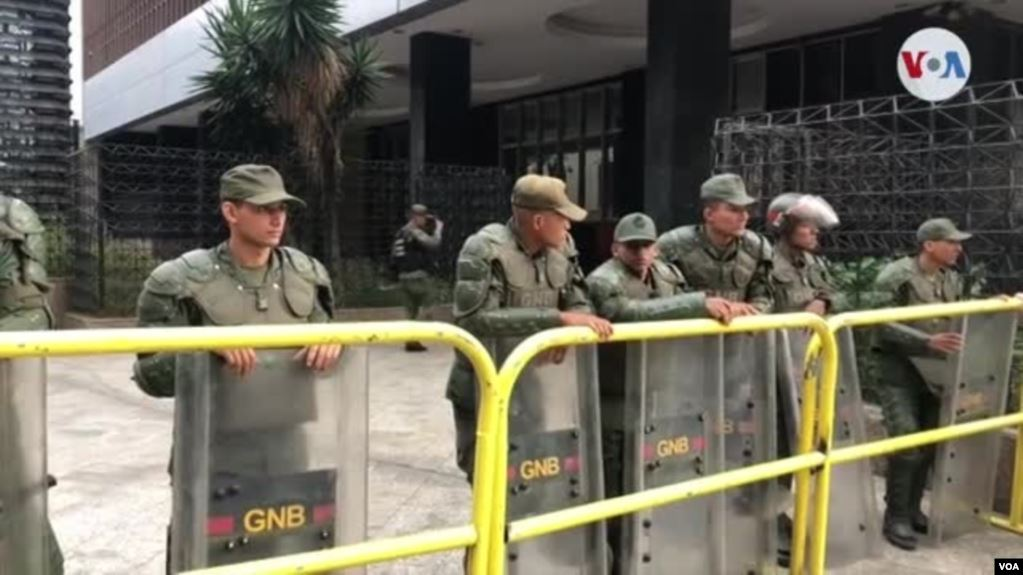
- Top to bottom Ongoing speaker Juan Guaidó trying to enter the National Assembly before the police blockade; Venezuelan National Guard officers blocking off access to the Palacio Federal Legislativo.
- Date: November 2019 – 5 January 2020
- Location: Venezuela
- Goals: Prevent the re-election of Juan Guaidó as President of the National Assembly of Venezuela.
- Methods: Corruption, bribery, embezzlement
- Result: Disruption of the 2020 Venezuelan National Assembly Delegated Committee election: Blockade and militarization of the Palacio Federal Legislativo.; Luis Parra declares himself as President of the National Assembly.; Separate session held, Guaidó reelected with 100 votes.

Parties
IV National Assembly of Venezuela	PSUV-CLAP faction

Lead figures
Juan Guaidó; Edgar Zambrano; Juan Pablo Guanipa; José Guerra; Delsa Solórzano Support: Democratic Unity Roundtable (MUD)	Luis Parra; José Brito; Franklyn Duarte; Conrado Pérez; José Gregorio Noriega Support: Government of Nicolás Maduro

Operación Alacrán (English: Operation Scorpion), also known as the CLAP affair or the PSUV-CLAP faction, is the name given to a corruption plot which was denounced in 2019 by the members of the National Assembly of Venezuela. It would have sought to avoid the re-election of Juan Guaidó on 5 January 2020 as President of the Assembly, by obtaining the support of opposing legislators in exchange for millions of dollars. Legislators would have been asked to vote against Guaidó, or to not attend the election and thereby break the necessary quorum.

== Background ==
In 2016, President Nicolás Maduro initiated the Local Committees for Supply and Production (CLAP) programme to meet ongoing food shortages. Much of the food provided by the programme was supplied by Colombian businessman Alex Saab. The United States Department of the Treasury, Colombian and Mexican law enforcement officials, Venezuelan investigative journalists and others had been reporting corruption related to the supply since 2017.

Meanwhile, a political and constitutional crisis was unfolding in Venezuela, heightened during the presidential crisis of 2019 in which there were two rival claimants to the country's presidency, the incumbent Maduro of the PSUV party and the opposition leader Juan Guaidó. Guaidó's claim to legitimacy rested on his presidency of the National Assembly, based on the opposition majority in the National Assembly, Venezuela's unicameral legislature, since the 2015 elections. The main opposition parties, united in the Democratic Unity Roundtable (MUD) coalition, are Justice First (Primero Justicia, PJ), A New Era (Un Nuevo Tiempo) and Popular Will (Voluntad Popular).

== Operation ==
In November 2019, deputy José Guerra denounced a strategy to bribe opposition lawmakers in what he called "Maletín Verde" (English: Green Suitcase), with the aim of breaking the qualified majority that the opposition had in the National Assembly.

=== Armando.info investigation ===
On 1 December, the website Armando.info published an investigation reporting that nine members of the opposition National Assembly mediated in favor of two businessmen linked with the government and the controversial Local Committees for Supply and Production (CLAP) program. The investigation reported that the implicated lawmakers had written letters of support to the United States Treasury and others to a Colombian man named Carlos Lizcano, who authorities were investigating over his possible links to Alex Saab, another Colombian associated with the food distribution program and under United States sanctions. According to Armando.info, the lawmakers wrote the letters despite being aware of evidence that tied Lizcano to Saab. In addition, the portal pointed to José Brito, Deputy of the National Assembly, as one of those implicated in alleged acts of corruption to "cleanse the reputation" of Colombian businessmen linked to the government of Nicolás Maduro and the network of embezzlement of social assistance funds of the Local Committees for Supply and Production (CLAP).

After the investigation was published, Juan Guaidó condemned the actions of the nine members, stating that it was "unacceptable to use a state institution to attempt to whitewash the reputation of thieves". Moreover, the scandal damaged Guaidó's reputation among his supporters in Venezuela, with some members of the opposition beginning to call for new leadership, according to analysts and those involved.

On 20 December, Deputies Luis Parra, José Brito, Conrado Pérez and José Gregorio "Goyo" Noriega were suspended and expelled from their respective parties, Justice First and Popular Will.

A further Armando.info report in January 2020 revealed that seven MPs - including Luis Parra, José Brito, Adolfo Superlano, Chaim Bucaram, Conrado Pérez and Richard Arteaga - travelled in Spring 2019 through seven European countries, including Liechtenstein, Bulgaria and Portugal, to lobby for Saenz. The trip was organised by Eurocontinentes Travel Agency, in Bogotá, Colombia, co-owned by Iván Caballero Ferreira, a businessman closely linked to Saab and Pulido. Images of the MPs in Europe were geolocated by open-source investigative website Bellingcat, confirming their visit to countries where Saab has significant business interests.

=== Political consequences ===
On 18 December 2019, on CNN Radio Argentina, Deputy Delsa Solórzano accused disputed President Nicolás Maduro of directing the operation. She said the government resorted to this method after failing to incarcerate or suspend the parliamentary immunity of the deputies, denouncing a considerable increase in political persecution as the 5 January National Assembly Delegated Committee election approached, explaining that security forces had gone to the houses of many deputies without alternates, and, according to Solórzano, bribed the one deputy with an alternate.

The Venezuelan opposition alleged that they were targeted by what they described as a "campaign of bribery and intimidation" by Nicolás Maduro's government in December 2019. Venezuelan lawmakers and the US State Department said that opposition deputies, in parties led or allied with Guaidó, were being offered up to US$1 million not to vote for him. Parra and other opposition deputies were removed from their parties following allegations that they were being bribed by Maduro. Deputies Ismael León and Luis Stefanelli directly accused Parra in December 2019 of attempting to bribe deputies to vote against Guaidó. Parra denied the allegations and said that he was open to being investigated for corruption. Weeks prior to his investigation, Parra openly shared support for Guaidó and promoted his protest movement.

Following the accusation, some parties conducted internal investigations, such as the Popular Will Conflict Committee. On 20 December 2019, the National Assembly indicated that the legislators involved were the principal deputies Parra, José Gregorio Noriega, José Brito, Adolfo Superlano and Conrado Pérez, and the deputies Leandro Domínguez and Jesús Gabriel Peña, a former member of Democratic Action. Deputy Arkiely Perfecto was expelled from the Democracy and Inclusion Movement for allegedly receiving bribes, as denounced by party head Nicmer Evans. Other deputies implicated in bribery are José Antonio España and José Gregorio Aparicio, both members of the parliamentary section of Superlano, and Domínguez, an independent for Renewal and Change.

In response to these reports, Brito said that 70 deputies demanded that Juan Guaidó provide the status of resources received from the humanitarian aid. Guaidó said he did not know of any letter signed by 70 deputies. The same day, the United States Agency for International Development (USAID) clarified that the interim government chaired by Guaidó does not administer money from humanitarian aid.

A partial reform of the Rules of Interior and Debates of the National Assembly had been approved on 17 December but was annulled by the Supreme Court of Justice (TSJ). The reform was intended to allow the virtual vote of deputies who had left the country. The National Communication Center of the National Assembly condemned the court's ruling, stating that the decision went hand-in-hand with "buying consciences of some deputies who have betrayed their constituents". A number of deputies went to the TSJ to request an appeal of the decision.

On 3 January 2020, Nicmer Evans, a Caracas-based analyst, alleged that Maduro had managed to cause 14 deputies to not cast a vote for Guaidó through these tactics. Guaidó theoretically controlled 112 seats in the Assembly at the time, needing 84 votes to win.

=== 2020 parliamentary crisis ===
On 5 January 2020, the 2020 Venezuelan National Assembly Delegated Committee election took place to determine who would be the President of the National Assembly for the 2020-21 period. Luis Parra, one of the former PJ MPs expelled after being implicated in Operación Alacrán, made a surprise bid to replace Juan Guaidó as President of the Assembly. While Guaidó and his supporters were prevented from accessing the Assembly chambers, Parra was elected by pro-government MPs and 18 former opposition deputies associated with Operación Alacrán, who became known as “la bancada Clap” (the CLAP bench) or the "PSUV-CLAP faction". The opposition, along with most international bodies, did not recognise the vote.

== Responses ==
On 3 December 2019, Conrado Pérez acknowledged having signed a contract with the Colombia-based Salva Foods company, but said that he does not know the businessman Alex Saab and that the only relationship he had with him was when they summoned him to the Comptroller's Committee, where his lawyers attended in his place, emphasizing that "we are not giving letters of good conduct to the citizen Alex Saab", putting his position to the order to investigate his management.

Adolfo Superlano rejected the accusations, stating that they were being accused for saying that they were not going to re-elect Guaidó.

Deputies Parra and Guillermo Luces denied the accusations against them. Parra said that the Armando.Info research article is part of a "dirty war" and alleged that the website was functioning as an extortion network. Luces stated that his signature mentioned on the documents is false.

In a press conference held on 20 December 2019, José Gregorio Noriega rejected the expulsion of his Popular Will party, stating that the allegations of corruption against him are false and criticizing the behavior of other party members. Noriega challenged his accusers to provide proof and threatened legal action. Through a press release, Popular Will said that Noriega was expelled from their ranks for refusing to respond to allegations of corruption. The deputy refused to accept questions from journalists during the press conference.

José Brito said on 2 December 2019 that "there is a rebellion in the Assembly" against the president of parliament, Juan Guaidó, and that he will abstain from voting for a new legislative president on 5 January 2020.

=== International responses ===
The United States Department of the Treasury sanctioned seven individuals in relation to Operación Alacrán, "who, at the bidding of Maduro, attempted to block the democratic process in Venezuela," according to US Secretary of theTreasury Steven Mnuchin on 13 January 2020. Those sanctioned have had their US assets frozen and have been banned from doing business with US financial markets and US citizens. The list includes the members of Parra's appointed board of directors and his supporters: Franklyn Duarte, José Gregorio Noriega, Negal Morales, José Brito, Conrado Pérez, and Adolfo Superlano, and Parra himself.

Maduro's Foreign Minister Jorge Arreaza responded to these sanctions by stating that the US Treasury sought to "interfere and undermine the proper functioning of democratic institutions, with the unusual intention to designate from Washington the authorities of the legislative power." The statement also argues that these tactics are "contrary to international law and undermine the stability, peace and self-determination of the Venezuelan people."

=== Denouncements after 5 January ===
On 27 January, Rafael Requesens denounced that Parra, through an intermediary from Yaracuy, asked her not to criticize him so strongly in social media, promising that if she complied, "he would personally speak with Maduro" to release her brother Juan Requesens and Gilber Caro.

After the correspondent of the digital outlet Crónica Uno Mónica Salazar made a public denouncement, on 30 January the National Journalists Association confirmed bribe attempts to journalists with large sums of money to publicly express support for Parra and his directive board.

In March 2020, a Reuters investigation confirmed much of the original opposition allegations, with telephone recordings and interviews with opposition MPs indicating deputies had been targeted with offers of financial incentives to switch support from Guaidó. MPs alleged that Jose Noriega made many of the offers.

== See also ==
- Interventions of political parties in Venezuela
- Democratic Alliance (Venezuela)
- Corruption in Venezuela
- Venezuelan presidential crisis
