= Ricardo Sánchez Mujica =

Venezuelan politician (born 1983)

Ministry of People's Power of University Education
- In office 27 August 2024 – 18 March 2026
- President: Nicolás Maduro (2024–2026); Delcy Rodríguez (2026)
- Preceded by: Sandra Oblitas
- Succeeded by: Ana María Sanjuán

Member of the 2017 Constituent National Assembly
- In office July 30, 2017 – 18 December 2020

Alternate deputy to the National Assembly of Venezuela of (Miranda)
- In office 5 January 2016 – July 30, 2017
- In office 5 January 2011 – 24 March 2014

Deputy to the National Assembly of Venezuela
- In office 24 March 2014 – 5 January 2016
- Preceded by: María Corina Machado
- Constituency: Miranda

Personal details
- Born: July 16, 1983 (age 42) Venezuela
- Party: UNT (2008–2012); Alianza para el Cambio (2013–2015); PSUV (2015–present)

Ricardo Sánchez Mujica (born 1983) is a Venezuelan politician and former student leader.

== Career ==
He was elected as María Corina Machado's substitute legislator in the 2010 Venezuelan parliamentary election, representing Un Nuevo Tiempo. Sánchez was elected President of the Federación de Centros Universitarios (FCU) at the Central University of Venezuela in 2007 and re-elected in 2008, and was one of the most prominent student leaders during 2007 protests against the television channel RCTV shutdown, and the 2007 Venezuelan constitutional referendum. In 2008 Sánchez was named by the United Nations Economic and Social Council as youth ambassador for the promotion of peace in the Americas. Sánchez has suffered several attacks by unknown people, including an incendiary device thrown at his car in 2006, and an assault in 2009.

In November 2012 Sánchez was one of three opposition substitute legislators who broke away from the Mesa de la Unidad Democrática opposition coalition.

In 2015 he was a candidate for deputy to the National Assembly for the pro-government Great Patriotic Pole (GPP) and joined the ranks of Chavism, and would be later elected as member of the 2017 Constituent National Assembly.
