= Alliance for Change (Venezuela) =

Political party in Venezuela

Alliance for Change Alianza para el Cambio
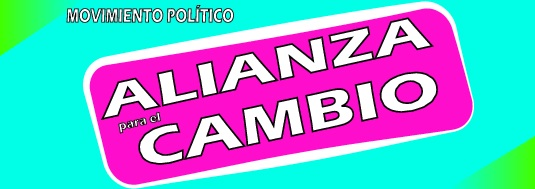
- Abbreviation: APC
- President: Carlos Vargas
- Secretary: Andrés Avelino Álvarez
- Secretary-General: Ricardo Sánchez Mujica
- Founded: August 1, 2013
- Ideology: Social democracy Democratic socialism
- Political position: Centre-left
- National affiliation: Great Patriotic Pole
- Colors
- National Assembly: 3 / 277
- Governors: 0 / 23
- Mayors: 0 / 335
- Latin American Parliament: 0 / 12
- Mercosur Parliament: 0 / 23

The Alliance for Change (Spanish: Alianza para el Cambio; APC) is a Venezuelan political party located on the centre-left of the political spectrum. It formalized its registration to the National Electoral Council on August 1, 2013.

It was founded by Andrés Avelino Álvarez, Ricardo Sánchez Mujica and Carlos Vargas who were previously national deputies for the Democratic Unity Roundtable (MUD) following the 2010 parliamentary election. They left the MUD after the 2012 presidential election.

Originally in opposition to President Nicolás Maduro, it has since joined the ruling Great Patriotic Pole and is critical of the MUD.
