= Red Flag Party =

Political party in Venezuela

Red Flag Party Partido Bandera Roja
- Leader: Gabriel Puerta Aponte
- Founded: 1970; 56 years ago
- Split from: Revolutionary Left Movement
- Headquarters: Caracas, Venezuela
- Ideology: Communism; Marxism–Leninism; Anti-Chavismo; Anti-revisionism; Hoxhaism
- Political position: Far-left
- National affiliation: Democratic Alliance
- Colours: Red
- National Assembly: 0 / 277

Website
- banderaroja.com.ve

The Red Flag Party (Spanish: Partido Bandera Roja) is a Marxist-Leninist party in Venezuela. Formed in 1970 by anti-revisionist members of the Revolutionary Left Movement (MIR), the party initially supported the ideology of Enver Hoxha and the Party of Labour of Albania following the Sino-Albanian split, though in later years it gravitated back towards China. In the 1970s up until the 1990s, it was engaged in guerrilla warfare against the government. A young Hugo Chávez's first assignment in the Venezuelan Army was as commander of a communications platoon attached to a counter-insurgency force—the Manuel Cedeño Mountain Infantry Battalion, headquartered in Barinas and Cumaná. In 1976, under the presidency of Carlos Andrés Pérez it was tasked with suppressing the guerrilla insurgency staged by the party.

The Red Flag Party is currently led by Gabriel Rafael Puerta Aponte. After the electoral victory of Chávez in 1998, the party started aligning itself with the liberal and social democratic opponents of Chávez, labeling him as a social fascist. This has led to desertions from the party as many cadres instead joined the Chávez camp. The party was suspended from the International Conference of Marxist–Leninist Parties and Organizations (Unity & Struggle) in 2005. It was succeeded within the organization by the Marxist–Leninist Communist Party of Venezuela.

In the 2006 presidential election, the Red Flag Party supported the candidature of Manuel Rosales. The party got 18,468 votes (0.16% of the nationwide vote) in that election as one of several parties backing Rosales. As of 2009, its popularity has rapidly diminished from its prior years and is reported to have less than 100 militant members. In 2014, the party left the Democratic Unity Table due to disagreements over objectives and not considering the coalition capable of placing itself on the forefront of people's struggles.

== Youth wing ==
The youth wing of the party is the Revolutionary Youth Union (UJR).

== See also ==
- List of political parties in Venezuela
- Interventions of political parties in Venezuela
- List of anti-revisionist groups
