= Javier Bertucci =

Venezuelan politician

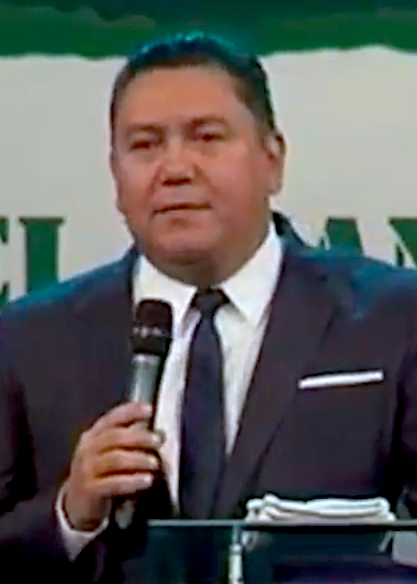
- Bertucci in 2018

Deputy of the National Assembly for Carabobo State
- Incumbent
- Assumed office January 5, 2021

Personal details
- Born: Javier Alejandro Bertucci Carrero; November 16, 1969 (age 56) Guanare, Portuguesa, Venezuela
- Party: Esperanza por El Cambio
- Spouse: Rebeca Barrios
- Children: Raquel Rebeca, Valeria Alejandra y Javier Abraham
- Occupation: Businessman, religious leader, politician

Javier Alejandro Bertucci Carrero (born November 16, 1969) is a Venezuelan evangelical pastor, philanthropist, and businessman. In 2016, he was linked to the leakage of the Panama Papers. He runs the Maranatha Christian Church, a religious congregation with more than 16,000 followers in Latin America that expands social work and evangelism through the Civil Association El Evangelio Cambia, of which he is a leader and founder. He was a candidate in the 2018 Venezuelan presidential election.

== Biography ==
Javier Bertucci was born on November 16, 1969, in Guanare, Portuguesa, to a peasant family that subsisted on a banana and tobacco producing plantation. From 1993, with his wife Rebeca, Bertucci began to preach in squares, parks, and houses. In the 1990s, the Bertucci Barrios family moved to Valencia, where they lived, and simultaneously formed a small evangelical church in the town of Tinaquillo (Cojedes, 48 km southwest of Valencia), which remained for the next five years.

== House arrest ==
On July 2, 2010, Bertucci was charged with aggravated smuggling and conspiracy to commit a crime. He was detained for three days when he tried to move a 5,000-metric-ton tanker ship from the Ocamar dock in Puerto Cabello to the port of Barahona in the Dominican Republic. The ship was thought to contain 5,000 tons of diesel disguised as paint thinner. The diesel, through its Tecnopetrol company, was referenced in file GP01-R-2010-000234 of the Court of Appeals.

During the presentation hearing, prosecutors Armando Galindo, Yolanda Carrero and Francisco Leal requested that Bertucci receive a custodial (incarceration) sentence. On July 4, the first judge in control of the Criminal Judicial Circuit, extension Puerto Cabello, Henry Chirino, ordered his house arrest. On September 30 of the same year he was granted a permit to leave his residence only to officiate at the Maranatha Church.

On December 20, Bertucci received a substitute measure of freedom with a filing system and was banned from leaving the country. His defense appealed and the court annulled the sentence, initiating a new trial that is still in progress under judge No. 2 of the Judicial Criminal Circuit of Carabobo state, Rosa Matute. The Venezuelan Supreme Court of Justice does not have a record of a signature sentence on the case.

== Panama Papers ==
Bertucci was linked to the leakage of the Panama Papers in 2016. According to a series of emails delivered to the German newspaper Süddeutsche Zeitung consulted for an investigation by journalist Katherine Pennacchio, Bertucci contacted the law firm Mossack Fonseca to be the president of Stockwin Enterprises Inc, a company created in Panama on January 3, 2012, with a capital investment of five million dollars dedicated to the purchase and sale of inputs, mainly the importation of raw materials from the food sector.

Desiré Obadia, an intermediary client of the company and the person in charge of negotiating with Mossak Fonsecca, denied that the transaction had been completed, stating that in order to import an import license and Cadivi dollars (National Center for Foreign Commerce) were needed, and that neither of the two were obtained. During the investigation, attempts were made to contact Bertucci on several occasions, but no response was received until five days after the report was published, when Bertucci explained that the initiative did not materialize and that he did not have the resources to possess accounts in tax havens.

Both the intermediary of Mossack Fonseca and Bertucci denied the accusations and rejected the investigative work done by the International Consortium of Investigative Journalists. The journalist was subjected to cyberbullying and attacks on social networks headed by Bertucci himself.

== Political career ==
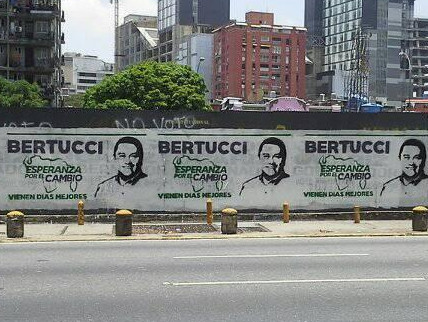
Campaign wall paintings of Bertucci in Altamira, Caracas.

In January 2018 he announced his presidential candidacy, in which he referred to his desire to be "the light among the darkness," to seek to electoral victory over Venezuelan leader Nicolás Maduro, and to affect change in the country.

As the Venezuelan constitution establishes a secular requirement for those running for office, Bertucci had to leave his occupation as a pastor.

Among his proposals as a candidate is the lifting of exchange control. He has also declared that he would not govern with Chavismo or with the opposition. He has additionally expressed his desire to implement Sunday radio and television channels using the Bible, and converting Venezuelans into "devotional" Christians, and to implement "Christian values". He has positioned himself against same-sex marriage and is in favor of abortion only in medical cases or that compromise the life of the mother.
