= José Brito (Venezuelan politician) =

Venezuelan politician

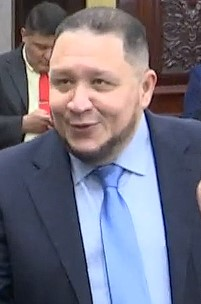
- Brito in 2022

National Coordinator of Venezuela First
- Incumbent
- Assumed office 4 September 2020
- Preceded by: Position established

Deputy of the National Assembly
- Incumbent
- Assumed office 5 January 2016
- Constituency: Anzoátegui State (2015-2021); National List (2021-present)

Councillor of Simón Rodríguez
- In office 7 August 2005 – 23 November 2008

Personal details
- Born: José Dionisio Brito Rodríguez; 15 January 1973 (age 53) Venezuela
- Party: Justice First (Until 2019; ad hoc since 2024); Venezuela First (2020–present)
- Other political affiliations: Democratic Unity Roundtable (Until 2019)
- Education: Universidad Nacional Experimental Simón Rodríguez

José Dionisio Brito Rodríguez (born 15 January 1973) is a Venezuelan administrator and politician who serves as a deputy to the National Assembly and former member of Justice First party.

== Biography ==
Brito studied Business Administration at the Simón Rodríguez National Experimental University (UNESR).

He was a member of the Movement for Socialism (MAS) party, and then joined the Podemos party.

Having lost the race to become mayor of the Simón Rodríguez Municipality in 2004 as a member of Project Venezuela, he was elected councillor in the 2005 municipal elections through an alliance of opposition parties, a position he held until 2008. In the elections of 2013, he ran for mayor of the Simón Rodríguez Municipality with the support of the Democratic Unity Roundtable, obtaining 34% and 25,618 votes, losing to the PSUV candidate, Jesús Figuera.

Under the banner of the Justice First party, he ran in the 2015 Venezuelan parliamentary election as a deputy for the Anzoátegui State, a seat he won for the 2016–2021 period.

== Controversies ==
The Armando.Info portal pointed to Brito as one of those implicated in alleged acts of corruption to "cleanse the reputation" of Colombian businessmen linked to the government of Nicolás Maduro and the network of embezzlement of social assistance funds of the Local Committees for Supply and Production (CLAP). In response to these reports, Brito said that 70 deputies demanded that Juan Guaidó the state of the resources received from the humanitarian aid. Guaidó said he did not know of any letter signed by 70 deputies. The same day, the United States Agency for International Development (USAID) clarified that the interim government chaired by Guaido does not administer money from humanitarian aid.

Days later on 2 December 2019, Brito said that "there is a rebellion in the Assembly" against the president of the parliament, Juan Guaidó and will abstain in the vote for a new legislative president on 5 January 2020.

=== Sanctions ===
The United States Department of the Treasury sanctioned Brito, Luis Parra and others, "who, at the bidding of Maduro, attempted to block the democratic process in Venezuela," according to US Secretary of Treasury Steven Mnuchin on 13 January 2020. The sanctioned have their assets in the US frozen and are not allowed to do business with US financial markets nor with US citizens.
