= Henri Falcón =

Venezuelan politician

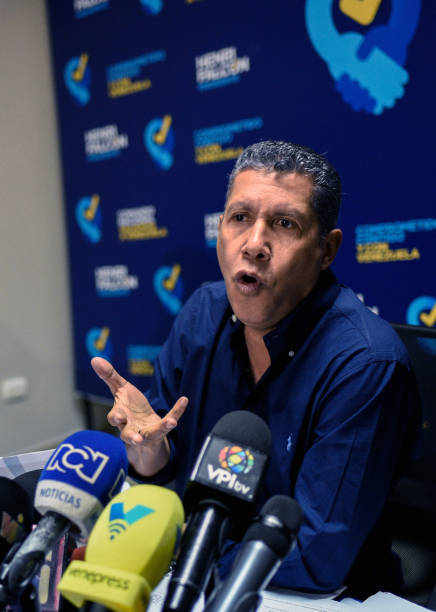
- Falcón in 2018

Deputy of the National Assembly of Venezuela
- Incumbent
- Assumed office 5 January 2026
- Constituency: National List

President of Progressive Advance
- In office 27 June 2012 – 22 March 2022
- Preceded by: Position established
- Succeeded by: Eduardo Semtei

Governor of Lara
- In office 13 December 2008 – 16 October 2017
- Preceded by: Luis Reyes Reyes
- Succeeded by: Carmen Meléndez

Mayor of Iribarren Municipality
- In office 30 July 2000 – 13 December 2008
- Preceded by: Macario González
- Succeeded by: Amalia Saez

Member of the Constituent National Assembly
- In office 3 August 1999 – 20 November 1999
- Constituency: Lara State

Personal details
- Born: 19 June 1961 (age 65) Nirgua, Yaracuy, Venezuela
- Party: HF Venezuela (2024-present); Progressive Advance (2012–2022); Fatherland for All (2010-2012); United Socialist Party of Venezuela (2007-2010); Fifth Republic Movement (1997-2007)
- Other political affiliations: Unitary Platform (2022-present); Democratic Alliance (2020-2022); Agreement for Change (2018-2020); Democratic Unity Roundtable (2012-2018)
- Spouse: Marielba Díaz de Falcón
- Children: 4
- Education: Universidad Santa María; Bolivarian Military Technical Academy
- Occupation: Politician, lawyer, military officer

Military service
- Allegiance: Venezuela
- Branch/service: Venezuelan Army

Henri Falcón Fuentes (born 19 June 1961) is a Venezuelan politician, lawyer, and retired Bolivarian Army non-commissioned officer. He served as mayor for two consecutive terms of Barquisimeto, Iribarren Municipality from 2000 to 2008 and as Governor of Lara from 2008 until 2017. He was a candidate in the 2018 Venezuelan presidential election.

== Background ==
Falcón was born in Nirgua, located north of the state capital, San Felipe, Venezuela. Falcón began his secondary studies at Valencia, Carabobo State, Venezuela until he entered in the armed forces of Venezuela in Caracas as non-commissioned officer of the army. He left the army with the rank of Maestro Técnico de Primera (the third highest of the eight ranks of sub-officials in the Venezuelan military). In 1987 he married Marielba Díaz, with whom he had four children. In 1992 he began his graduate studies in political science at Simón Bolívar University.

== Career ==
During his studies in Caracas he met Hugo Chávez shortly before the 1992 Venezuelan coup d'état attempts, and through Chávez met Luis Reyes Reyes (who later would be the Governor of Lara between 2000 and 2008). Falcón was elected as a delegate to the 1999 National Constituent Assembly from Lara State.

=== Mayor ===
In the regional elections of 2000, he was elected mayor the city of Barquisimeto, Iribarren Municipality, the third most populous city in Venezuela, earning 51.61% of the vote. He was reelected in the regional elections of 2004 with an overwhelming 64.33% of the vote.

=== Governor of Lara State ===
Falcón was elected governor of Lara State in 2008, as a candidate of the United Socialist Party of Venezuela (PSUV), with 73.15% of the votes.

As governor Falcón did not support the 2009 Venezuelan Constitutional Referendum, which was ultimately supported by the Venezuelan electorate.

He was re-elected in 2012, as a candidate of the Democratic Unity Roundtable (MUD) opposition coalition, with 54.35% of the votes. He defeated former governor Luis Reyes Reyes, who had served before Falcón.

=== Party switch ===
In 2007, Movimiento V República (MVR, "Fifth Republic Movement"), of which Falcón was a member, was transformed into the United Socialist Party of Venezuela (PSUV). On 21 February 2010 Governor Falcón gave a letter to President Hugo Chávez declaring his resignation from the PSUV to join the more independent pro-government party Patria Para Todos (PPT, "Fatherland for All"), and to become a member of the latter party's national directorate. Falcón declared that "The relation between a Head of state and the governors and mayors cannot be limited to the emission of instructions or orders without the minimum opportunity that we can confront points of view, to analyze the pros and the cons of your determined initiatives and to revise or to revoke decisions that, after their execution, turn out to be harmful or objections to the interest of the region or of the country".

In June 2012, Falcón announced the creation of a new political party, Progressive Advance, that was aligned with the opposition coalition (known as MUD), and thus supported the candidacy of Henrique Capriles against incumbent President Hugo Chávez in the 2012 Venezuelan presidential election.

In January 2018, Falcón announced he will be running for president, as a candidate of the Progressive Advance party, in the upcoming Venezuelan snap election scheduled for 30 April 2018 but was delayed to 20 May 2018.

== Political views ==
=== Domestic ===
Falcón has stated that he was once a Chavista, though he separated from the movement when he began to disagree with its direction. When Falcón left PSUV in 2010, he criticized the party believing there was a lack of space between Hugo Chávez and Venezuelan officials, stating "The relationship between a head of state and governors and mayors cannot be limited to issuance of orders or instructions without the least opportunity that we can confront points of view, analyze the pros and cons of certain initiatives, and revise or revoke decisions that, after their execution, result in harm or inconvenience to the interests of the region or the country." He also believed that PSUV was "undermined by bureaucracy, lack of discussion, patronage, groupism, and a poorly understood concept of loyalty". Falcón was also criticized at the time for meeting with opposition students who protested against the Venezuelan government.

One of three opposition governors, Falcón, citing the danger of civil unrest, called for dialogue rather than confrontation with the Maduro government in June 2015. Falcón stated that Venezuela's governmental model was "finished" though he cautioned a "jump from one extreme to another". Falcón's ideas and his experience with both the Bolivarian government and the opposition was noted by Reuters which stated Falcón would "be a central figure" of a transitional government in Venezuela.

=== International ===
Falcon has disagreed with the mainstream opposition approach. In March 2015, U.S. President Obama issued an executive order declaring Venezuela a national security threat and imposing sanctions on seven Venezuelan officials accused of human rights abuses; Falcón described the order as "threatening", "interventionist and unfriendly", saying the tone was "disrespectful" not just to the government but to all Venezuelans. He said he regarded the sanctions as an intrusion into the internal affairs of the country, as well as a disservice to Venezuela's political opposition.

=== "Venezuela Future Movement" Party changed to "HF Venezuela" ===
In March 2022, Falcon announced his new party "Futuro", an organization with political purposes, but on March 23, 2024 he denounced the government of Nicolás Maduro for stealing the name of his party "Futuro" with a minority group of leaders of his command. He assured that he and his team remain committed to the unitary and democratic route, supporting María Corina Machado to achieve the change that is longed for by citizens after announcing on March 18 her support for MCM by confirming that she won "in a good fight." the primaries held in October 2023. «In these crucial moments for the country, we want to announce that the name of our FUTURE movement has been confiscated, stolen by the government, to register a candidate that we do not recognize nor will we ever support. Our position has been clear and sustained,” Falcón wrote. After the action by ruling party leaders against the organization, he announced that "from now on we identify ourselves as "HF Venezuela."
