= Progressive Advance =

Venezuelan political party

Progressive Advance Avanzada Progresista
- President: Henri Falcon
- General Secretary: Luis Augusto Romero
- Founded: 27 June 2012; 13 years ago
- Split from: United Socialist Party of Venezuela; Fatherland for All; For Social Democracy
- Headquarters: Caracas
- Ideology: Social democracy Progressivism
- Political position: Centre-left
- National affiliation: Democratic Alliance
- International affiliation: Progressive Alliance
- Colors: Blue, yellow, orange
- Seats in the National Assembly: 3 / 277
- Governors of States of Venezuela: 0 / 23
- Mayors: 0 / 335

Website
- avanzadaprogresista.org

Progressive Advance (Spanish: Avanzada Progresista) is an anti-Chavista progressive political party in Venezuela, founded by former members of For Social Democracy (PODEMOS), Fatherland for All and the United Socialist Party of Venezuela in June 2012. The party's current general secretary is Luis Augusto Romero.

== See also ==
- Category:Progressive Advance politicians
