= Justice First =

Political party in Venezuela

Justice First Primero Justicia
- Leader: Juan Pablo Guanipa
- President: María Beatriz Martínez
- Deputy Leaders: Richard Mardo; Carlos Ocariz
- Coordinator: Julio Borges
- Founded: 3 March 2000
- Split from: Copei
- Headquarters: Edif. Pofili, Urb. Los Palos Grandes, Caracas
- Ideology: Humanism; Social conservatism Liberalism; Decentralization
- Political position: Centre-right
- National affiliation: Unitary Platform (since 2021); Democratic Unity Roundtable (2008–2021)
- International affiliation: Centrist Democrat International
- Colours: Yellow Black
- National Assembly: 0 / 277
- Latin American Parliament: 0 / 12
- Mercosur Parliament: 0 / 23
- Governors: 1 / 23
- Mayors: 12 / 335

Website
- primerojusticia.org.ve

Justice First (Spanish: Primero Justicia) is a centre-right political party in Venezuela. Founded in 1992 as a civil association, it became a political party in 2000. Henrique Capriles was the candidate of the party in the 2013 Venezuelan presidential election.

== History ==
Justice First was created in 1992 as a civil association by a group of university students under the leadership of Alirio Abreu Burelli. The group was concerned about what they saw as a deterioration of judicial power in the country, and sought a reform of Venezuela's legal system. Abreu Burelli was magistrate of the federal Supreme Court of Justice and Vice President of the Inter-American Court of Human Rights of the Organization of American States (OAS). The association entered the political arena during the 1999 Constituent Assembly of Venezuela, in which they presented a draft for the country's new constitution. Justice First became a political party in 2000, initially as a regional party, and registered as a national party with the National Electoral Council of Venezuela on 1 March 2002.

In the July 2000 legislative elections, five members of Justice First were elected as deputies to the National Assembly for a five-year term: Carlos Ocariz, Gerardo Blyde, Julio Borges, Ramón Medina and Liliana Hernández. Justice First participated in the last minute opposition boycott of the 2005 elections, so they had no representatives in the Assembly from 2005 to 2010. They contested the 2006 presidential elections with former congressman Julio Borges, but he dropped out of the race in support of Manuel Rosales, then governor of Zulia State, and former Mayor of Maracaibo. Henrique Capriles Radonski was elected governor of Miranda in 2008. The party had six deputies elected at the 2010 parliamentary elections: Tomas Guanipa in Zulia, Juan Carlos Caldera and Julio Borges in Miranda, Dinorah Figuera in the capital district, Richard Mardo in Aragua, and Richard Arteaga in Anzoátegui.

In December 2019, in Operación Alacrán, the website Armando.info published an investigation on corruption among opposition politicians, leading to the expulsion of deputies, including Luis Parra, José Brito and Conrado Pérez, from PJ. In 2020, José Brito and Conrado Pérez filed a complaint in the Supreme Tribunal of Justice against the leadership of Justice First. The deputies asked to be restituted in the party, saying that there was no justification to be expelled, and that their due process and presumption of innocence had not been respected. They also asked the high court to appoint a new leadership "that was in Venezuela", since the current one was in exile, and to summon new internal elections.

The deputies were received by the president of the Constitutional Chamber and the meeting lasted a little more than an hour. Outside the Supreme Tribunal, a group of around two hundred people met in support of the deputies. El Pitazo reported that earlier in the morning, some persons were handing out shirts of the party, most apparently new. Several demonstrators interviewed by the outlet expressed ignoring the reasons of the meeting or the contents of the complaint introduced. In some cases, they affirmed having been taken by bus, could not say for long they were part of Justice First, did not know that Luis Parra was not present or declared being paid for assisting. The party's secretary general, Tomás Guanipa, declared that the deputies sought to give the party's electoral card to Nicolás Maduro. In January 2020, the disputed 2020 Venezuelan National Assembly Delegated Committee election took place to determine who would be the President of the National Assembly for the period 2020-21 period; pro-government MPs and the expelled PJ deputies voted for Parra while the remaining PJ deputies endorsed incumbent president Juan Guaidó.

== See also ==
- Fernando Albán
