= Edgar Zambrano =

Venezuelan politician

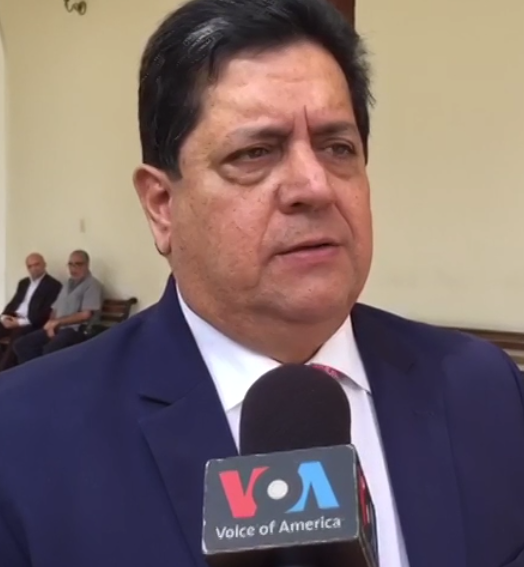
- Zambrano in 2018

Vice President of the National Assembly of Venezuela
- In office 5 January 2019 – 5 January 2020
- President: Juan Guaidó
- Preceded by: Julio César Reyes
- Succeeded by: Juan Pablo Guanipa

President of the Permanent Defense and Security Commission
- In office 15 January 2016 – 30 January 2019
- President: Omar Barboza (2018-19); Julio Borges (2017-18); Henry Ramos Allup (2016-17)

Deputy of the National Assembly for Lara State
- In office 5 January 2011 – 5 January 2021
- In office 14 August 2000 – 5 January 2006

Personal details
- Born: Edgar José Zambrano Ramírez; 20 July 1955 (age 71) Barquisimeto, Venezuela
- Party: Democratic Action
- Spouse(s): Sobella Mejías; Nubia Borges (divorced)
- Children: 2
- Education: University Fermín Toro
- Occupation: Lawyer

Edgar José Zambrano Ramírez (born 20 July 1955) is a Venezuelan lawyer and politician that currently serves as a National Assembly deputy for the Lara state. From January 5, 2019 to January 5, 2020, he served as First Vice President of the Assembly. He was President of the Permanent Defense and Security Parliamentary Commission between 2016 and 2018. He is the vice president of the opposition political party Democratic Action.

== Opposition figure ==
Within the opposition, Zambrano "is seen as a conciliatory figure" close to Henry Ramos Allup. During the Venezuelan presidential crisis, he has been working as an aide to interim president Juan Guaidó, as part of a power-sharing agreement among the largest opposition parties.

== Arrest and detention ==
In May 2019, the Supreme Tribunal of Justice, which is allied with Nicolás Maduro, ordered the prosecution of seven National Assembly members for their actions during the failed uprising against Maduro, including Zambrano, on charges of "betraying the homeland" and "instigating an insurrection" during the uprising.

On 8 May 2019, Zambrano was arrested in Caracas by a heavily armed commando unit of the SEBIN intelligence service, who surrounded Zambrano's car and towed it away with Zambrano inside. The day before the arrest, the Constituent Assembly, which is controlled by Maduro loyalists, stripped Zambrano and the six other opposition legislators of parliamentary immunity, a move that the opposition regards as illegitimate. The Venezuelan opposition, the Lima Group of twelve Latin American nations plus Canada, the European Union, and the United States all condemned Zambrano's detention as arbitrary and an unconstitutional violation of his parliamentary immunity. Guaidó called the arrest a kidnapping. Organization of American States Secretary-General Luis Almagro said: "We demand the SEBIN stop the intimidation, respect the lawmakers' parliamentary immunities, and immediately release Edgar Zambrano." The Office of the United Nations High Commissioner for Human Rights (OHCHR), directed by former president of Chile, Michelle Bachelet, demanded the "immediate release" of Zambrano.

After four months of arrest, Zambrano was freed on 18 September. Forbidden to leave the country, Zambrano's case remains open and he must report to a judge every month. In the words of Juan Guaidó, the release is the result of popular pressure and the report of Michelle Bachelet, and not a "kind gesture from the dictatorship" of Nicolás Maduro.

== Personal life ==
His parents are José de los Santos Zambrano and Lucila de Zambrano, and he has two sisters and one brother.

== See also ==
- Political prisoners in Venezuela
- Enforced disappearances in Venezuela
