= President of the National Assembly of Venezuela =

Presiding officer of the National Assembly of Venezuela

President of the National Assembly
- Incumbent; Disputed between Jorge Rodríguez and Dinorah Figuera since 5 January 2023
- Appointer: National Assembly
- Term length: 1 year
- Inaugural holder: Willian Lara
- Formation: 10 August 2000
- Deputy: First Vice President
- Website: www.asambleanacional.gob.ve

The president of the National Assembly (Spanish: Presidente de la Asamblea Nacional) is the presiding officer (speaker) of the National Assembly, Venezuela's unicameral legislature. The president's term coincides with the term of the legislature (five years as per constitutional convention). The post has existed since the election of the first National Assembly in 2000. Before the creation of the National Assembly with the adoption of the 1999 constitution, the country's legislature was the bicameral Congress, which contained the Senate and the Chamber of Deputies. The last president of the Senate was Luis Alfonso Dávila, and the last president of the Chamber of Deputies was Henrique Capriles Radonski.

Since 5 January 2019, Juan Guaidó, a member of the Popular Will (VP) party and the Democratic Unity Roundtable coalition, has been President of the National Assembly. On 5 January 2020, however, state police blocked some deputies' entry to the chambers of the National Assembly as Luis Parra was elected to be the next president of the Assembly, with Guaidó and his allies alleging the election took place without a quorum being present. However, José Noriega of the Popular Will party and second vice-president of the National Assembly stated that a sufficient number of votes were cast for a valid election. Following the disputed election, two competing claims emerged over the post – one by Luis Parra and one by Juan Guaidó, with both claiming to be the legitimate President of the National Assembly.

In 2020, parliamentary elections took place in Venezuela, in which, without opposition participation and amid claims for fraud and lack of transparency, Chavismo took full control of the legislature. Since January 5, 2021, the date on which the majority socialist parliament began sessions – the V Legislature, Jorge Rodríguez claims to be the president of the National Assembly, while the IV Legislature, elected in 2015 and recognized by a considerable part of the international community, extended its functions through a referendum, so Juan Guaidó also continues to maintain that he leads the Venezuelan parliament. By this situation, it is understood that two parliaments now operate in parallel in the country, one elected in 2015 with an opposition majority, and another elected in 2020 with a Chavista majority.

== Constitutional role ==
The president of the National Assembly's authority resides in Article 194 of the Venezuelan constitution (section 2, chapter 1, Title V: "On the Organization of the National Public Authority"), which states the deputies are to elect a president and two vice-presidents from among themselves to administer and represent the National Assembly for a period of one year. Alongside the president and the two vice-presidents, the deputies also elect a -secretary and an under-secretary. The president of the National Assembly is second in the line of succession of the president of Venezuela after the vice president, as stated in Article 233 of the constitution.

== List of presidents of the National Assembly ==
No.	Portrait	Name (Birth–Death)	Term of office		State	Legislature	Party
1		Willian Lara (1959–2010)	10 August 2000	5 January 2003	Guárico	1st	Fifth Republic Movement
2		Francisco Ameliach (born 1963)	5 January 2003	5 January 2005	Carabobo	1st	Fifth Republic Movement
3		Nicolás Maduro (born 1962)	5 January 2005	7 August 2006	Capital District	2nd	Fifth Republic Movement
4		Cilia Flores (born 1956)	15 August 2006	5 January 2011	Capital District	2nd	Fifth Republic Movement
4		Cilia Flores (born 1956)	15 August 2006	5 January 2011	Capital District	2nd	United Socialist Party
5		Fernando Soto Rojas (born 1933)	5 January 2011	5 January 2012	Falcón	3rd	United Socialist Party (GPP)
6		Diosdado Cabello (born 1963)	5 January 2012	5 January 2016	Monagas	3rd	United Socialist Party (GPP)
7		Henry Ramos Allup (born 1943)	5 January 2016	5 January 2017	Capital District	4th	Democratic Action (MUD)
8		Julio Borges (born 1969)	5 January 2017	5 January 2018	Miranda	4th	Justice First (MUD)
9		Omar Barboza (born 1944)	5 January 2018	5 January 2019	Zulia	4th	A New Era (MUD)
10		Juan Guaidó (born 1983)	5 January 2019 (Note: Disputed with Rodríguez from 5 January 2021 to 5 January 2023.)	5 January 2023	Vargas (La Guaira)	4th	Popular Will (MUD → PUD)
11		Luis Parra (born 1978)	5 January 2020 (Note: Disputed with Guaidó.)	5 January 2021	Yaracuy	4th	Independent (GPP)
12		Jorge Rodríguez (born 1965)	5 January 2021	Incumbent	Capital District	5th 6th	United Socialist Party (GPP)
(11)		Dinorah Figuera (born 1961)	5 January 2023 (Note: Disputed with Rodríguez from 5 January 2023.)	Incumbent	Aragua	4th	Justice First (PUD)

== See also ==
- National Assembly (Venezuela)
- Venezuelan Chamber of Deputies, Lower house of Venezuela 1961-1999
- Senate of Venezuela, Upper house of Venezuela 1961-1999
- Speaker
