= Bararida Zoological and Botanical Park =

Bararida Zoological and Botanical Park Parque Zoológico y Botánico Bararida
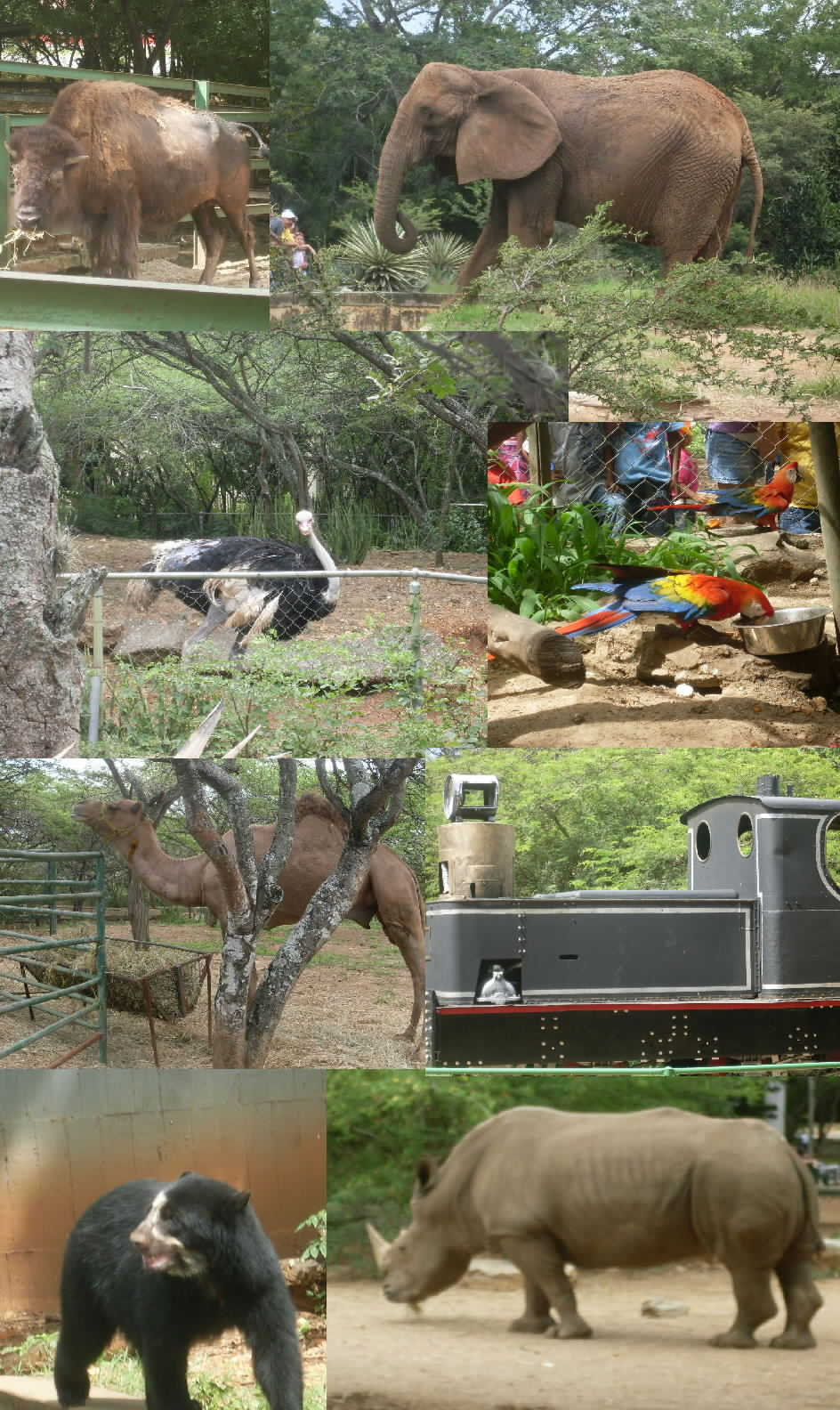
- Interactive map of Bararida Zoological and Botanical Park; Parque Zoológico y Botánico Bararida
- 10°4′45″N 69°18′10″W
- Date opened: 1967
- Location: Barquisimeto, Venezuela

The Bararida Zoological and Botanical Park (Spanish: Parque Zoológico y Botánico Bararida) Also Bararida Zoo Is a park, zoo and botanical garden that is located in the city of Barquisimeto, the capital of Lara State, in the South American country of Venezuela.

It is a national reference zoo with a staff of 210 workers. It operates as a Decentralized Service attached to the Lara State Government.

It is subscribed to the Venezuelan Association of Zoological Parks and Aquariums (AVPZA) which is a member of the Latin American Association of Zoological Parks and Aquariums (ALPZA). He is registered in the Ministry of the Popular Power for the Environment (MPPAmb) before the National Foundation of Zoological Parks and Aquariums of Venezuela (FUNPZA) under the number ZOO-AC-V011.

In the park there is an important collection of native trees from the country and abroad, also a collection of approximately 8,222 animals (388 mammals, 265 birds, 1269 reptiles, 20 amphibians, 1 Arthropod and 6279 fish), where 65% of them are in danger of extinction. In addition, approximately 150 different species of plants are exhibited in the park.

== Gallery ==
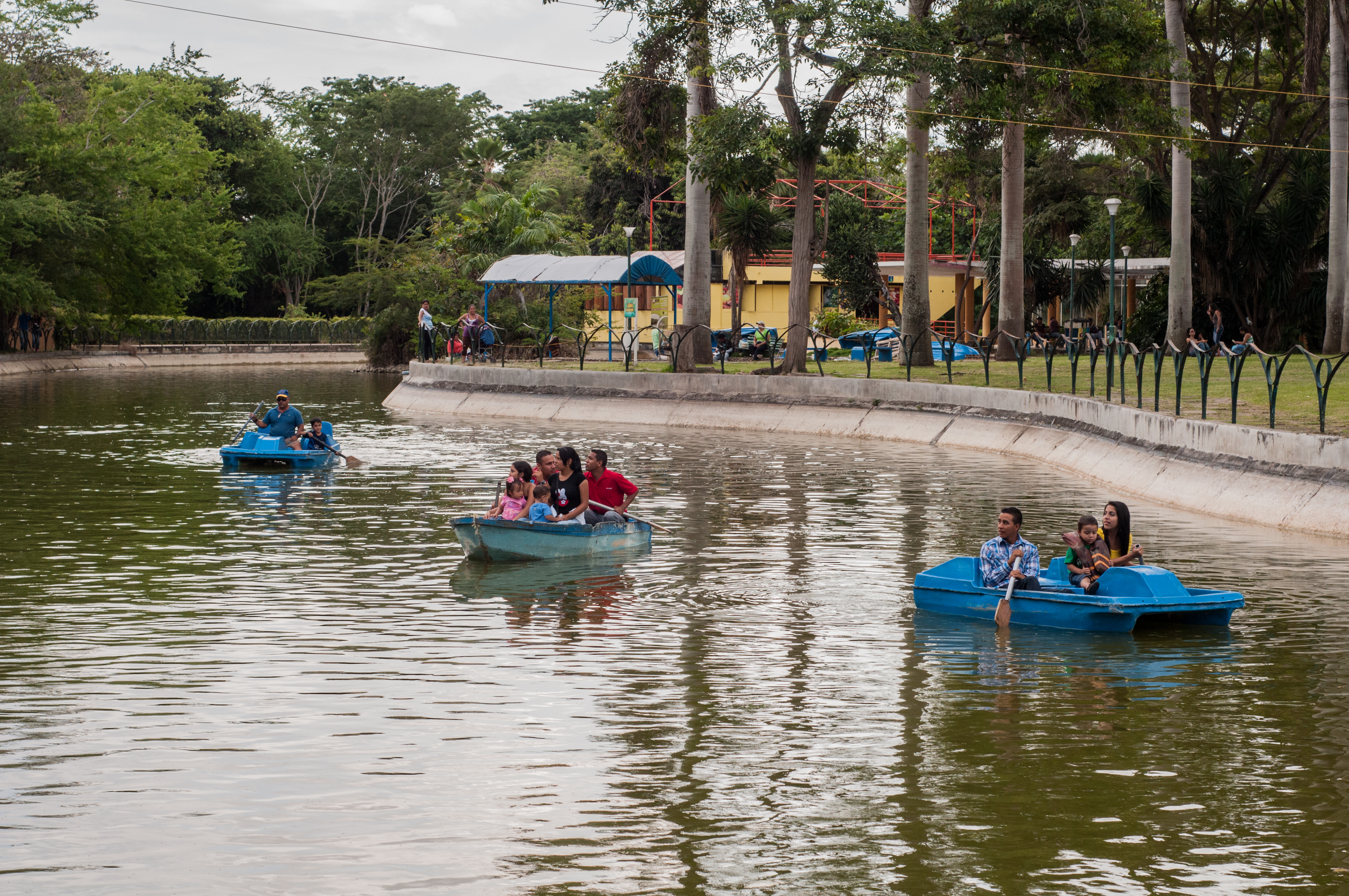

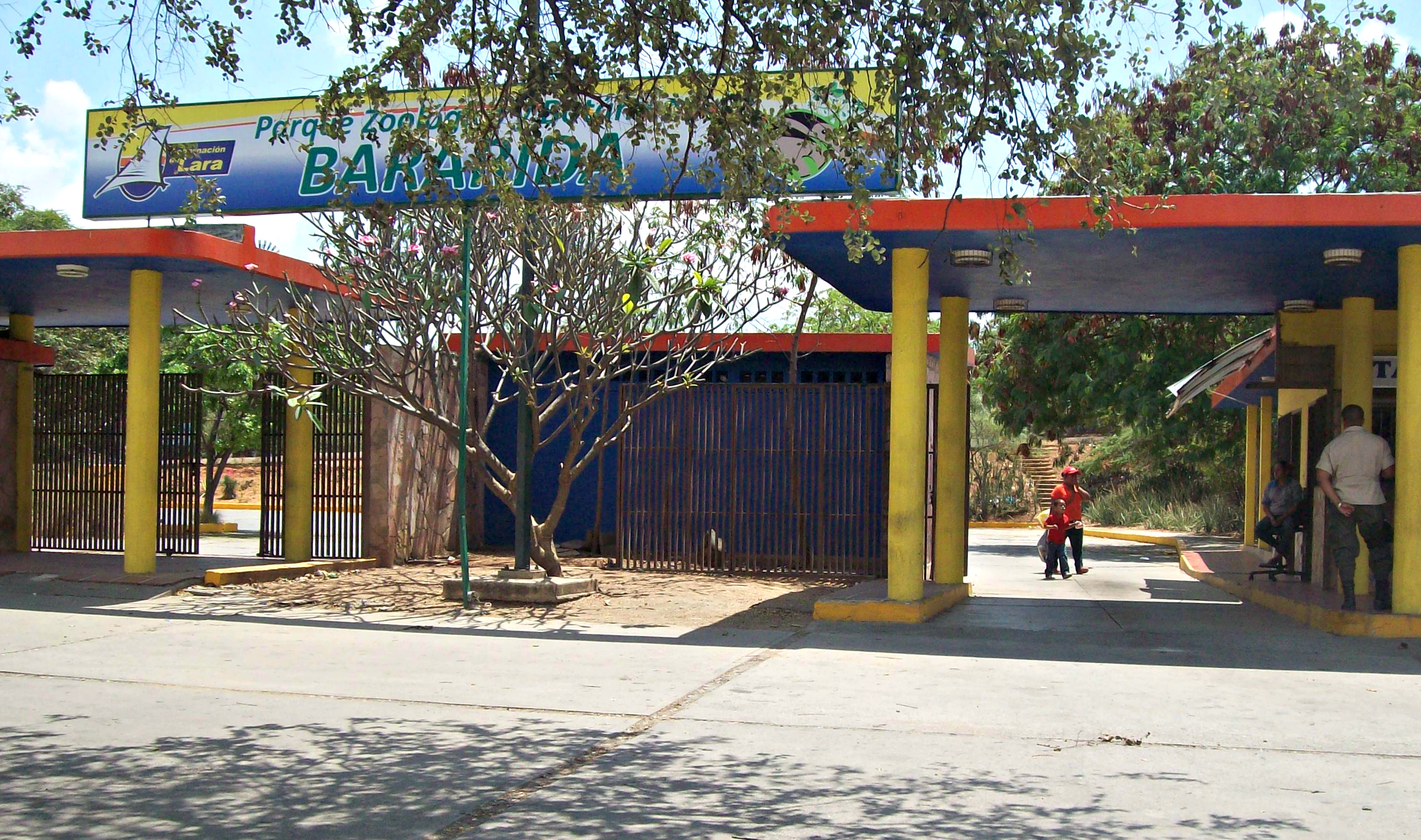

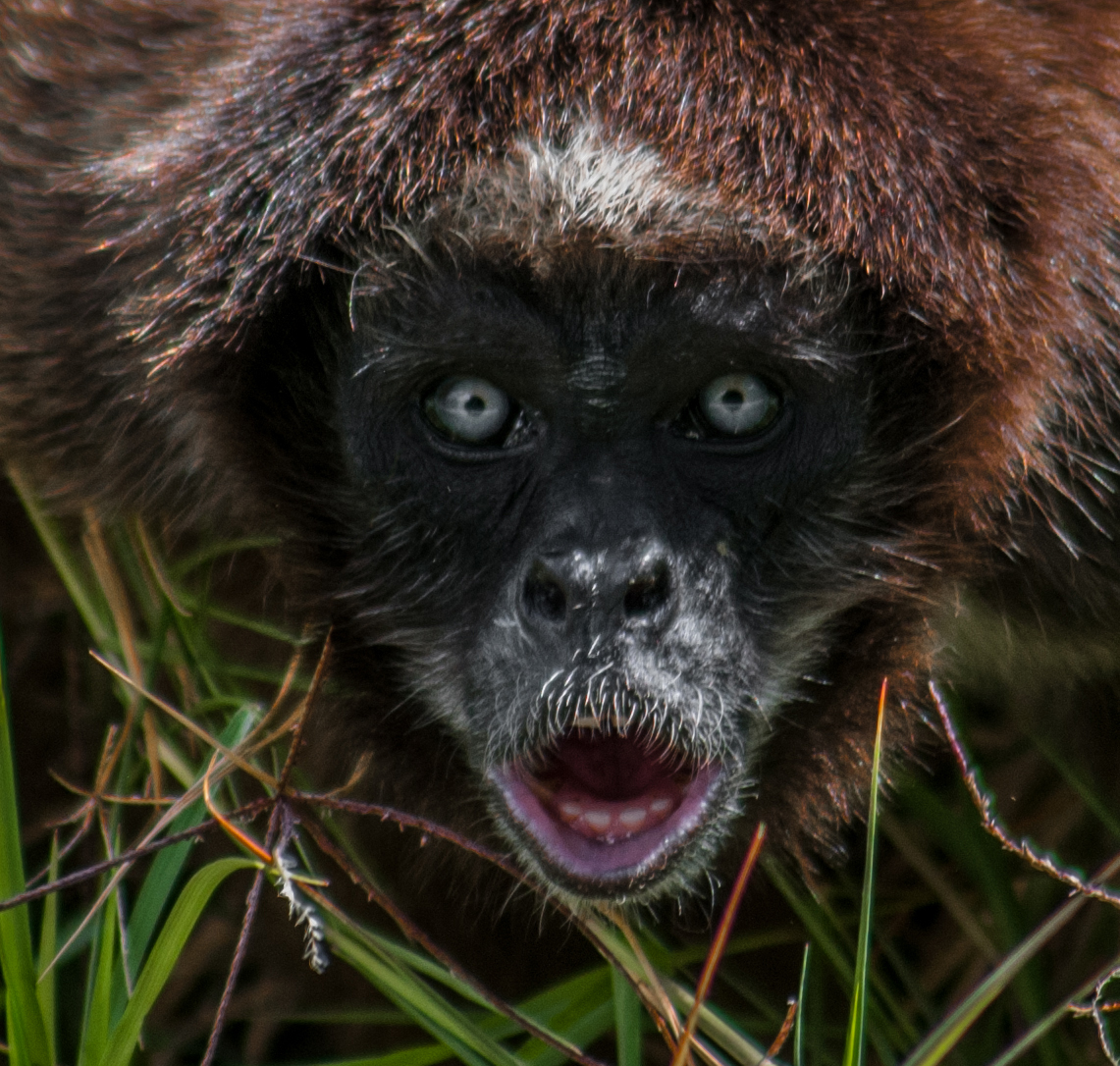

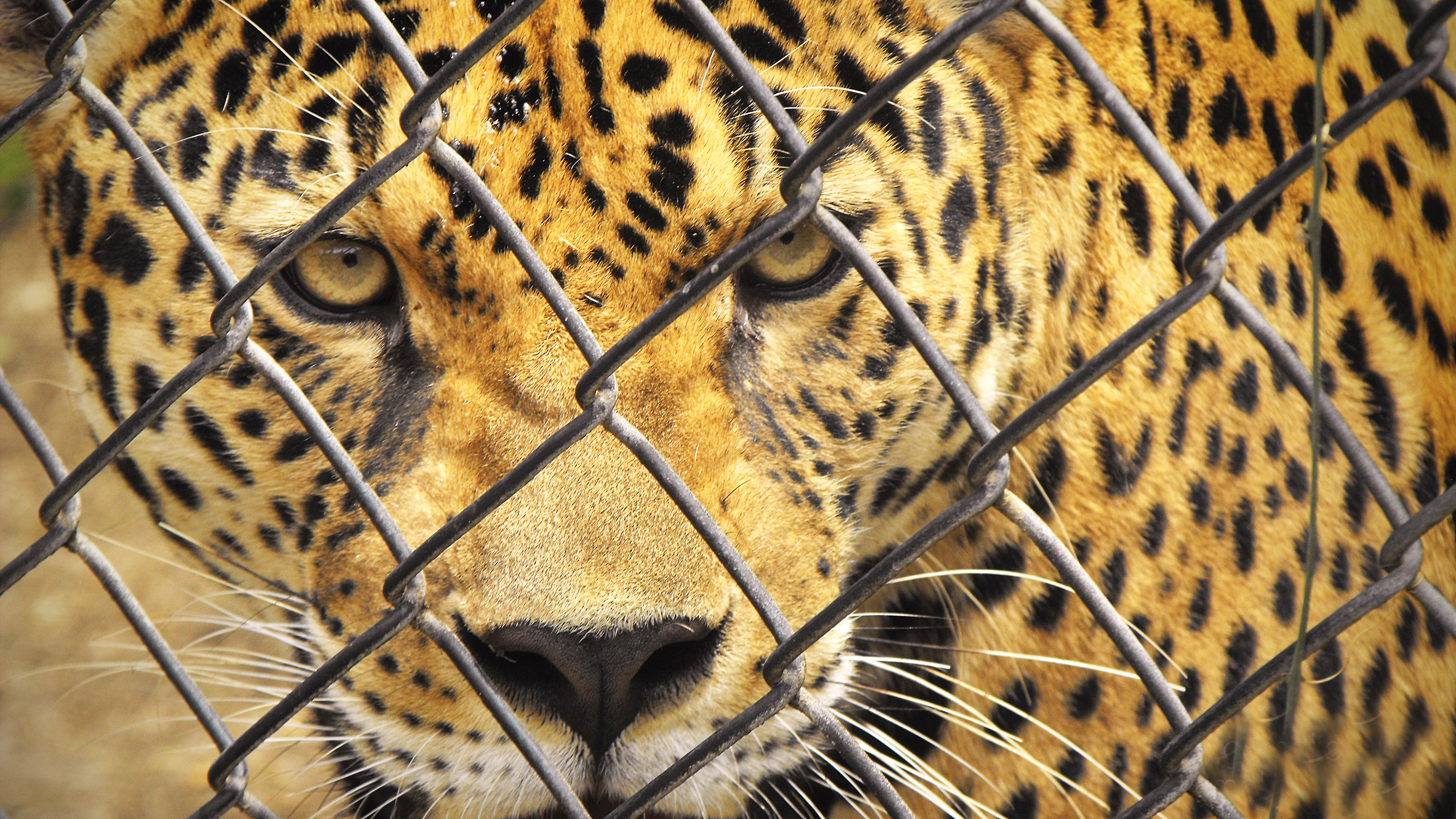

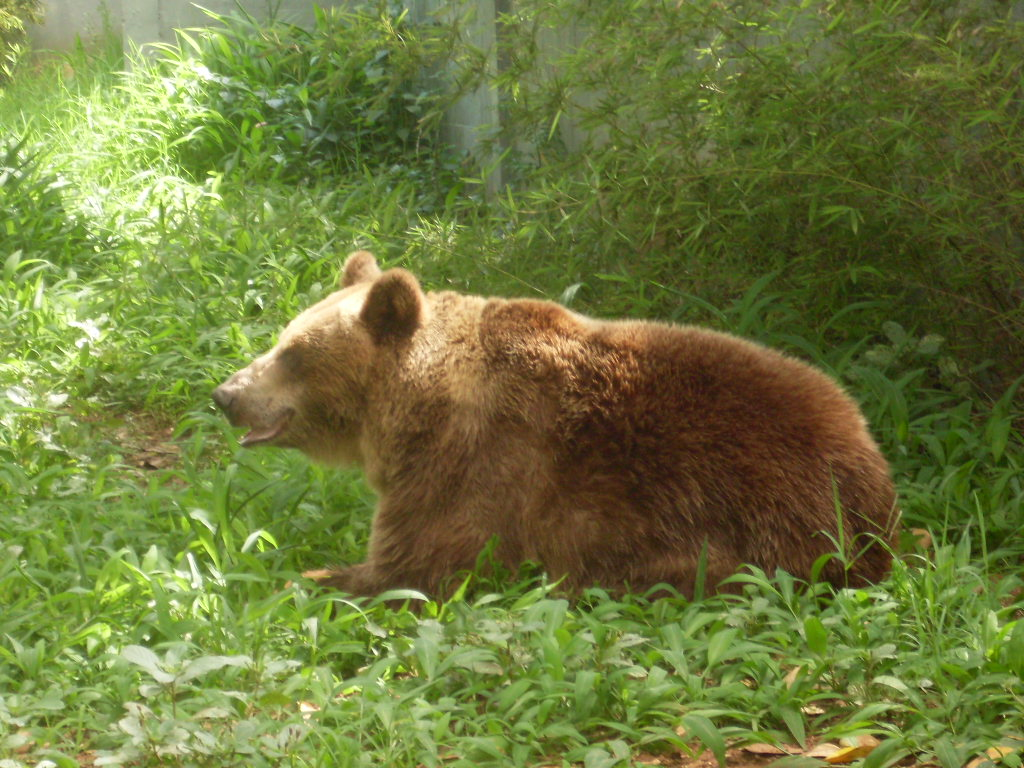

== See also ==
- List of national parks of Venezuela
- Zulia Metropolitan Zoo
