= Omar Prieto =

Venezuelan politician

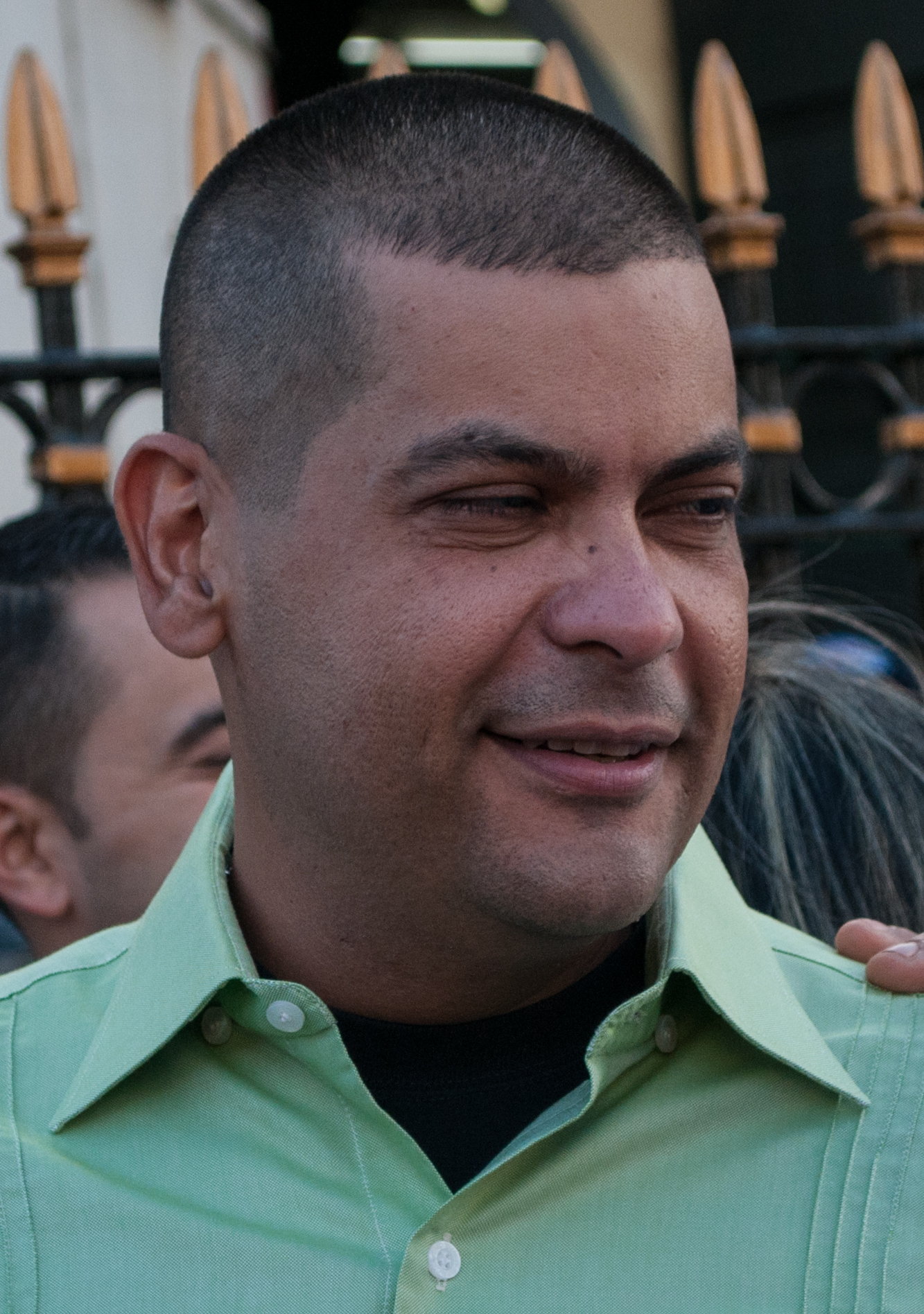

Governor of Zulia
- In office 10 December 2017 – 10 December 2021
- Preceded by: Juan Pablo Guanipa; Magdely Valbuena (interim)
- Succeeded by: Manuel Rosales

Mayor of San Francisco
- In office 23 November 2008 – 10 December 2017
- Preceded by: Saady Bijani
- Succeeded by: Dirwings Arrieta

Personal details
- Born: Omar José Prieto Fernández; 25 May 1969 (age 57) San Francisco, Zulia, Venezuela
- Party: United Socialist Party of Venezuela (PSUV)
- Occupation: Economist, musician, politician

Omar José Prieto Fernández (born 25 May 1969), is a Venezuelan economist, musician and politician who was governor of Zulia from 2017 to 2021. He was mayor of San Francisco, Zulia, for two consecutive periods.

== Political career ==
In 2008, he was elected mayor of the San Francisco municipality of Zulia, and reelected again in 2013.

In 2015, he ran as a candidate for deputy to the National Assembly where he was the winner, later Prieto resigned his seat before starting the period in 2016 to remain in his initial position as mayor of San Francisco.

=== Governor of Zulia ===
On 10 December 2017, he accedes to the position of governor of the Zulia state in dubious circumstances. The elected governor in regional elections on 15 October 2017, Juan Pablo Guanipa was dismissed by the Legislative Council of Zulia. After the repetition of the elections, Omar Prieto is elected as Governor by the United Socialist Party of Venezuela (PSUV) with 57.35% of the votes, before the opposition candidate Manuel Rosales.

On 10 July 2020, Prieto tested positive for COVID-19, during the pandemic in Venezuela.

== Controversies ==
=== Threats to opponents ===
On 11 February 2019, Prieto at a rally in the Rosario de Perijá municipality, launched a threat against opponents who are pushing for humanitarian aid to enter the country, which is led by several countries in the region. Prieto affirmed that the opponents of Chavismo were no longer called "emaciated", but "traitors to the homeland," for supporting what, in his opinion, is an American military intervention. He stated that if "the gringos put a boot here we have to look for the traitors," referring to the opponents of such armed intervention.

=== Sanctions ===
On 25 February 2019, the Office of Foreign Assets Control (OFAC) of the United States Department of the Treasury placed sanctions in effect against Prieto and governors of 3 other Venezuelan states for alleged involvement in corruption and in blocking the delivery of humanitarian aid.

Prieto was sanctioned by the Canadian government on 15 April 2019 under the Special Economic Measures Act. The government statement said "the sanctions hit high ranking officials of the Maduro regime, regional governors, and people directly implicated in activities undermining democratic institutions." Foreign Minister Chrystia Freeland stated, "The Maduro dictatorship must be held accountable for this crisis and depriving Venezuelans of their most basic rights and needs. Canada is committed to supporting the peaceful restoration of constitutional democracy in Venezuela."

In 2021, Omar Prieto was put on the EU's sanctions list due to his active involvement in undermining and threatening Venezuela's democracy and rule of law in Zulia State as its governor and his support for the Maduro regime.
