= Movement for Direct Democracy =

Former Venezuelan political party

Movement for Direct Democracy Movimiento por la Democracia Directa
- Leader: Richard Peñalver
- Founded: 2000
- Dissolved: January 7, 2007
- Merged into: United Socialist Party of Venezuela
- Ideology: Direct democracy Socialism; Anti-capitalism; Chavismo; Bolivarianism
- Political position: Far-left
- Colors: Orange; Black; Gray

Movement for Direct Democracy (Spanish: Movimiento por la Democracia Directa, MDD) was a Venezuelan far-left political party, which was officially founded in April 2000. It was dissolved on January 7, 2007, after its leadership decided to merge MDD with the newly founded United Socialist Party of Venezuela (PSUV) in support of Bolivarian Revolution led by Hugo Chávez. MDD describes itself as a civic-military political movement that identifies with the Bolivarian and Anti-Capitalist ideals, it focuses on promoting Bolivarian revolution and direct democracy throughout the South American continent.

== History ==
MDD emerged after the 2000 Venezuelan general election due to some minor ideological disagreements with members of pro-Chavez parties, who were dissatisfied with the way they were running Venezuela. On 2006, Richard Peñalver was appointed as the party's leader and Hugo Chávez as its presidential candidate. On January 7, 2007, the party was merged with PSUV and dissolved.

== Electoral history ==
The first election in which the Movement for Direct Democracy participated was the 2000 presidential election, on that election they supported the opposition candidate Francisco Arias Cárdenas, the party obtained 1.02% of the popular vote. From 2002 they began to support former president Hugo Chávez by forming alliance with Fifth Republic Movement for the 2004 regional elections. In the 2006 presidential elections they joined the FRM coalition again to re-elect Hugo Chávez, in those elections MDD obtained 45000+ votes, 0.35% of the popular vote.

On January 7, 2007, MDD spokesmen announced their dissolution to join the United Socialist Party of Venezuela proposed by Hugo Chávez in mid-December 2006. Currently, the Lead Organizer of MDD, Richard Peñalver and other senior members of the party are participating as members of the Promotional Commission of the United Socialist Party of Venezuela.

== See also ==
- United Socialist Party of Venezuela
- Direct democracy
- Politics of Venezuela
