= List of presidents and governors of Zulia =

List of Presidents and Governors of Zulia
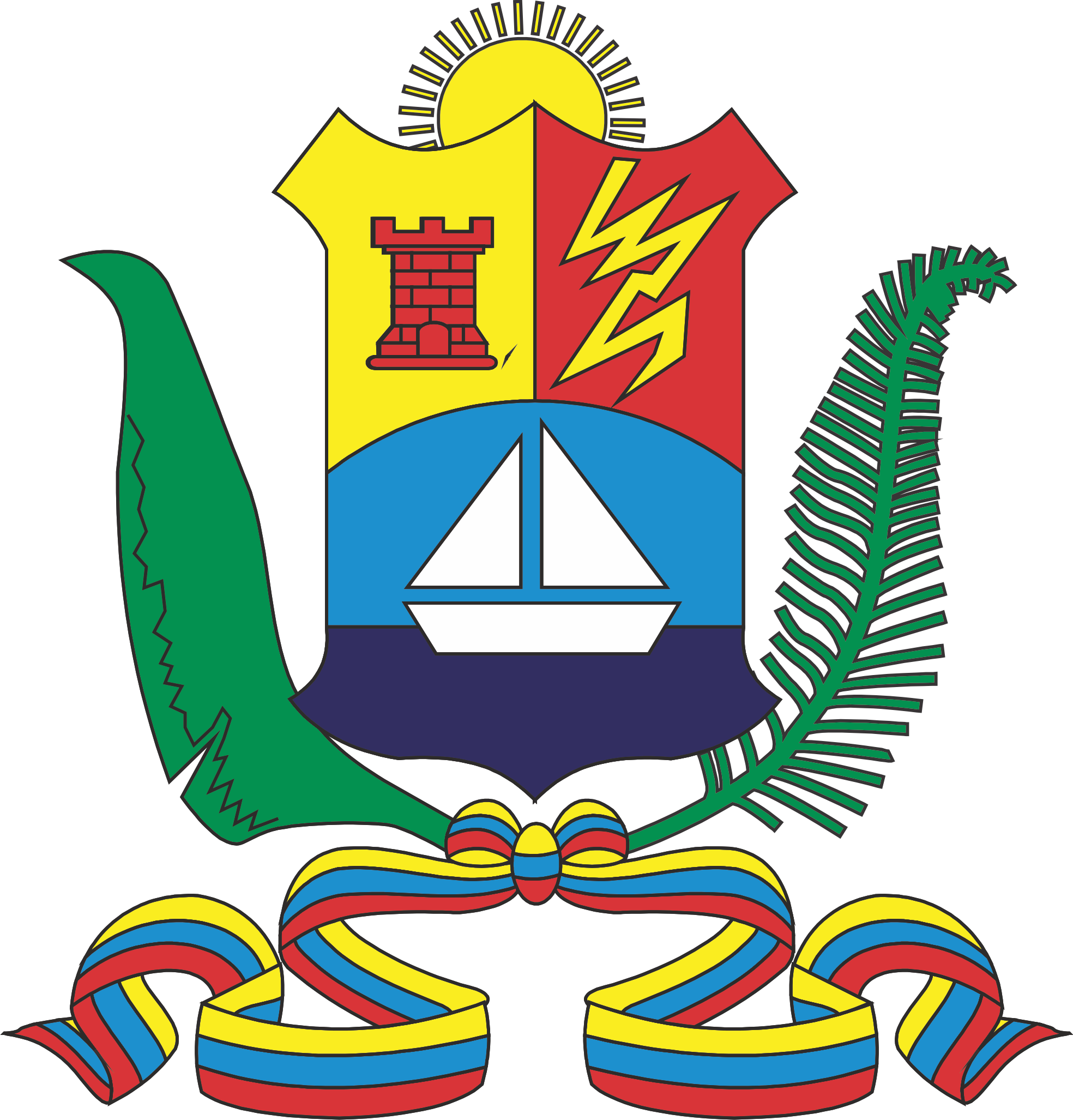
- State coat of Arms

- Flag of the State
- Incumbent; Luis Caldera
- Style: Governor
- Status: Head of State
- Term length: Four years

This is a list of presidents and governors of the Venezuelan Zulia State. In some years the head of Zulia state was known as President or Civil and Military Chief, in others Governor. In 1881 Zulia was joined in a union with Falcón. Its autonomy was restored in 1890 with Maracaibo as its capital.

== Presidents ==
- 1863-1868 Jorge Sutherland
- 1868-1870 José María Hernández (Venezuela)
- 1870-1874 Venancio Pulgar
- 1880 José Victorino García Olavarría

== Governors ==
Until 1989, governors were appointed by the President of Venezuela. Starting from that year they are elected in universal, direct and secret elections.

#	Name	Party	Term
1	Benjamín Ruiz	N/A	1900
2	Aurelio Valbuena	N/A	1900
3	Juan Francisco Castillo	N/A	1900
4	Rafael López Baralt	N/A	1900
5	Diego Bautista Ferrer	N/A	1900–1902
6	Guillermo Aranguren	N/A	1902–1904
7	Regulo Olivares	N/A	1904–1908
8	José Ignacio Lares Baralt	N/A	1908–1909
9	Alejandro Rivas Vásquez	N/A	1909–1911
10	José María García	N/A	1911–1915
11	Jose Antonio Chavez	N/A	1915–1916
12	Alberto Aranguren	N/A	1916–1918
13	Santo Matute Gómez	N/A	1918–1919
14	José J. Gabaldon	N/A	1919–1921
15	Santos Matute Gómez	N/A	1921–1924
16	Renato Serrano	N/A	1924–1925
17	Isilio Febres Cordero	N/A	1925–1926
18	Vicencio Pérez Soto	N/A	1926–1929
19	J.M. Leonardo Villasmil	N/A	1929–1936
20	León Jurado	N/A	1936
21	Regulo Olivares	N/A	1936
22	Luis Rocajolo	N/A	1936–1937
23	José Encarnación Serrano	N/A	1937–1938
24	Manuel Maldonado	N/A	1938–1941
25	Abigail Colmenares	N/A	1941
26	Luis Pino Ochoa	N/A	1941
27	Alberto Lossada Casanova	N/A	1941–1942
28	José Quintero García	N/A	1942–1943
29	Benito Roncajolo	N/A	1943
30	Luis Pinto Salvatierra	N/A	1943
31	Héctor Cuenca	N/A	1943
32	Carlos Ramírez MacGregor	N/A	1943–1945
33	Felipe Hernández	N/A	1945
34	Octavio Andrade Delgado	N/A	1945–1947
35	Hercolino Adrianza	N/A	1947–1949
36	Atenogenes Olivares	N/A	1949–1950
37	Leopoldo D'Alta	N/A	1950
38	Darío Parra	N/A	1950
39	Renato Estevan Ríos	N/A	1950
40	Néstor Prato Chacón	N/A	1950–1958
41	Rafael Virgilio Vivas	N/A	1958
42	Gaston Montiel Villasmil	N/A	1958
43	Pedro Bracho Urdaneta	N/A	1958
44	Renato Estevan Ríos	N/A	1958
45	Horacio Guillermo Villalobos	N/A	1958
46	Julio Arraga Zuleta	N/A	1958
47	Horacio Guillermo Villalobos	N/A	1958–1959
48	Eloy Parraga Villamarin	Acción Democrática	1959–1961
49	Luis Vera Gómez	Acción Democrática	1961–1964
50	Octavio Andrade Delgado	Acción Democrática	1964–1967
51	Luis Vera Gómez	Acción Democrática	1967–1968
52	Gabriel José Páez	Acción Democrática	1968
53	José León García Díaz	Acción Democrática	1968–1969
54	Elio Suárez Romero	COPEI	1969–1971
55	Hilarion Cardozo	COPEI	1971–1974
56	Carmelo Contreras Barboza	Acción Democrática	1974–1975
57	Omar Baralt Méndez	Acción Democrática	1975–1977
58	Guillermo Rincón Araujo	Acción Democrática	1977–1979
59	Gilberto Urdaneta Bessón	COPEI	1979–1982
60	Humberto Fernández Auvert	COPEI	1982–1984
61	Ángel Zambrano	Acción Democrática	1984–1985
62	Omar Barboza Gutiérrez	Acción Democrática	1985–1989
63	Ismael Ordaz González	Acción Democrática	1989–1990
64	Oswaldo Álvarez Paz	COPEI	1990–1993
65	Lolita Aniyar de Castro	Movimiento al Socialismo	1993–1996
66	Francisco Arias Cárdenas	La Causa Radical	1996–1998
67	Giovanny Villalobos	N/A	1998–1999
68	Germán Valero	N/A	1999–2000
69	Manuel Rosales	Un Nuevo Tiempo	2000–2008
70	Pablo Pérez	Un Nuevo Tiempo	2008–2012
71	Francisco Arias Cárdenas	United Socialist Party of Venezuela	2012–2017
72	Juan Pablo Guanipa	Justice First	2017
73	Magdely Valbuena	PSUV	2017
74	Omar Prieto	PSUV	2017–2021
75	Manuel Rosales	Un Nuevo Tiempo	2021-2025
76	Luis Caldera	GPPSB	2025-2029

== List of elected governors ==
Took office	Left office	Governor	Vote
1989	1992	Oswaldo Álvarez Paz, COPEI	38.44
1992	1993	Oswaldo Álvarez Paz, COPEI	66.03
1993	1995	Lolita Aniyar de Castro, MAS	40.74
1995	1998	Francisco Arias Cárdenas, Radical Cause	30.45
1998	2000	Francisco Arias Cárdenas, Radical Cause	54.49
2000	2004	Manuel Rosales, A New Era	51.44
2004	2008	Manuel Rosales, A New Era	54.03
2008	2012	Pablo Pérez Álvarez, A New Era	53.59
2012	2017	Francisco Arias Cárdenas, PSUV	52.22
2017	2017	Juan Pablo Guanipa, PJ	51,06
2017	2017	Magdely Valbuena, PSUV	Replacement after Guanipa's removal.
2017	2021	Omar Prieto, PSUV	57.35
2021	2025	Manuel Rosales, A New Era	56.90
2025	2029	Luis Caldera, GPPSB	64.63

== See also ==
- History of Venezuela
- List of Venezuela governors
- Politics of Venezuela
- Zulia state
