= Labor Power =

Labor Power Labor Poder
- Abbreviation: PL
- President: Reina Sequera
- Chairperson: Havier Penaloza
- Founded: October 4, 1999
- Ideology: Progressivism; Social democracy
- Political position: Centre-left
- Colors: Yellow, Green, Black

Labor Power (Spanish: Poder Laboral, PL) is a centre-left political party in Venezuela that is part of the group of parties that oppose the Bolivarian Revolution led by the PSUV and its allies of the Great Patriotic Pole. PL is made up of mostly Progressive, Christian democratic and mainly Social democratic tendencies.

It was formally created on October 4, 1999 in Caracas and restructured on March 8, 2003.

The Supreme Court of Justice disqualified PL from participating in the 2018 presidential elections, which was subsequently cancelled by the National Electoral Council.

== History ==
In mid-2006, when the Venezuelan opposition was preparing for the 2006 presidential election, the idea of a single opposition candidacy began to be discussed. Among the main candidates who discussed this possibility were Teodoro Petkoff, Julio Borges, Reina Siqueira and Manuel Rosales, the latter being favored to present their candidacy through consensus.

On January 23, 2008, in commemoration of the 50th anniversary of the return of democracy to Venezuela, after the overthrow of General Marcos Pérez Jiménez by the Patriotic Board, the main opposition political parties met at the city of Caracas in order to sign a document in which they committed to create a series of national objectives and their vision of the country. The agreement was proposed by the former National Secretary General of Copei, Luis Ignacio Planas, on January, 2008. The agreement was signed by all opposition parties including PL.

On December 16, 2012, after the 2012 MUD presidential primary the decision was made to separate PL from Democratic Unity Roundtable.
