= Omar Barboza =

Venezuelan politician

Coordinator of the Unitary Platform
- Incumbent
- Assumed office 16 May 2022
- Preceded by: José Luis Cartaya (MUD)

9th President of the National Assembly of Venezuela
- In office 5 January 2018 – 5 January 2019
- Preceded by: Julio Borges
- Succeeded by: Juan Guaidó

Deputy of the National Assembly for Zulia State
- In office 5 January 2011 – 5 January 2021

Member of the Chamber of Deputies for Zulia State
- In office 23 January 1994 – 22 December 1999

Governor of Zulia
- In office 8 June 1985 – 2 February 1989
- President: Jaime Lusinchi
- Preceded by: Ángel Zambrano
- Succeeded by: Ismael Ordaz González

Personal details
- Born: Omar Enrique Barboza Gutiérrez; 27 July 1944 (age 81) Maracaibo, Zulia, Venezuela
- Party: Democratic Action (Until 1999); Un Nuevo Tiempo (1999–present)
- Other political affiliations: Democratic Unity Roundtable

Omar Enrique Barboza Gutiérrez (born 27 July 1944) is a Venezuelan politician who served as the 9th President of the National Assembly of Venezuela from 2018 to 2019. He was a member of the Venezuelan Chamber of Deputies and assembly. Prior to his tenure in the legislature he was the governor of Zulia from 1985 to 1989.

== Early life and education ==
Omar Barboza Gutiérrez was born in Maracaibo, Venezuela, on 27 July 1944.

== Career ==
President Jaime Lusinchi appointed Barboza as governor of Zulia in 1985, and he held the position until 1989. Oswaldo Álvarez Paz defeated him in the 1989 election, the first time the governor was directly elected. He ran for governor in the 1995 election, but was defeated by Francisco Arias Cárdenas.

In 1989, Barboza was elected to the Venezuelan Chamber of Deputies as a member of Democratic Action. During his tenure in the chamber he was president of the Finance commission. He ran for a seat in the Andean Parliament in 2005, but the election was postponed indefinitely.

Barboza joined other members of Democratic Action that broke away to form Un Nuevo Tiempo. He became president of Un Nuevo Tiempo in 2007. He resigned as executive secretary of Unitary Platform on 13 March 2025, and was succeeded by Roberto Enríquez.

Barboza was elected President of the National Assembly of Venezuela on 5 January 2018, with 102 votes in favour and none against. At the time the assembly was the only branch of Venezuela's government controlled by the opposition.

== Political positions ==
Barboza stated that the removal of term limits by the 2009 constitutional referendum turned Venezuela into a dictatorship.

== Works cited ==
- "Omar Barboza, el nuevo presidente de la Asamblea Nacional de Venezuela que promete reconstruir la unidad de la oposición". BBC. 6 January 2018. Archived from the original on 1 July 2025.
- "Roberto Enríquez asume como secretario ejecutivo de la Plataforma Unitaria". Tal Cual. 16 March 2025. Archived from the original on 1 July 2025.
- Hurtado, Jesus (5 January 2018). "¿Quién es Omar Barboza, el nuevo presidente de la Asamblea Nacional?". Tal Cual. Archived from the original on 1 July 2025.
- Price, Niko (16 February 2009). "Chavez wins vote to scrap term limits in Venezuela". Associated Press. Archived from the original on 17 February 2009.

Political offices
Preceded by Julio Borges	President of the National Assembly of Venezuela; 2018–2019	Succeeded by Juan Guaidó
