= San Francisco Municipality, Zulia =

San Francisco
- Municipality
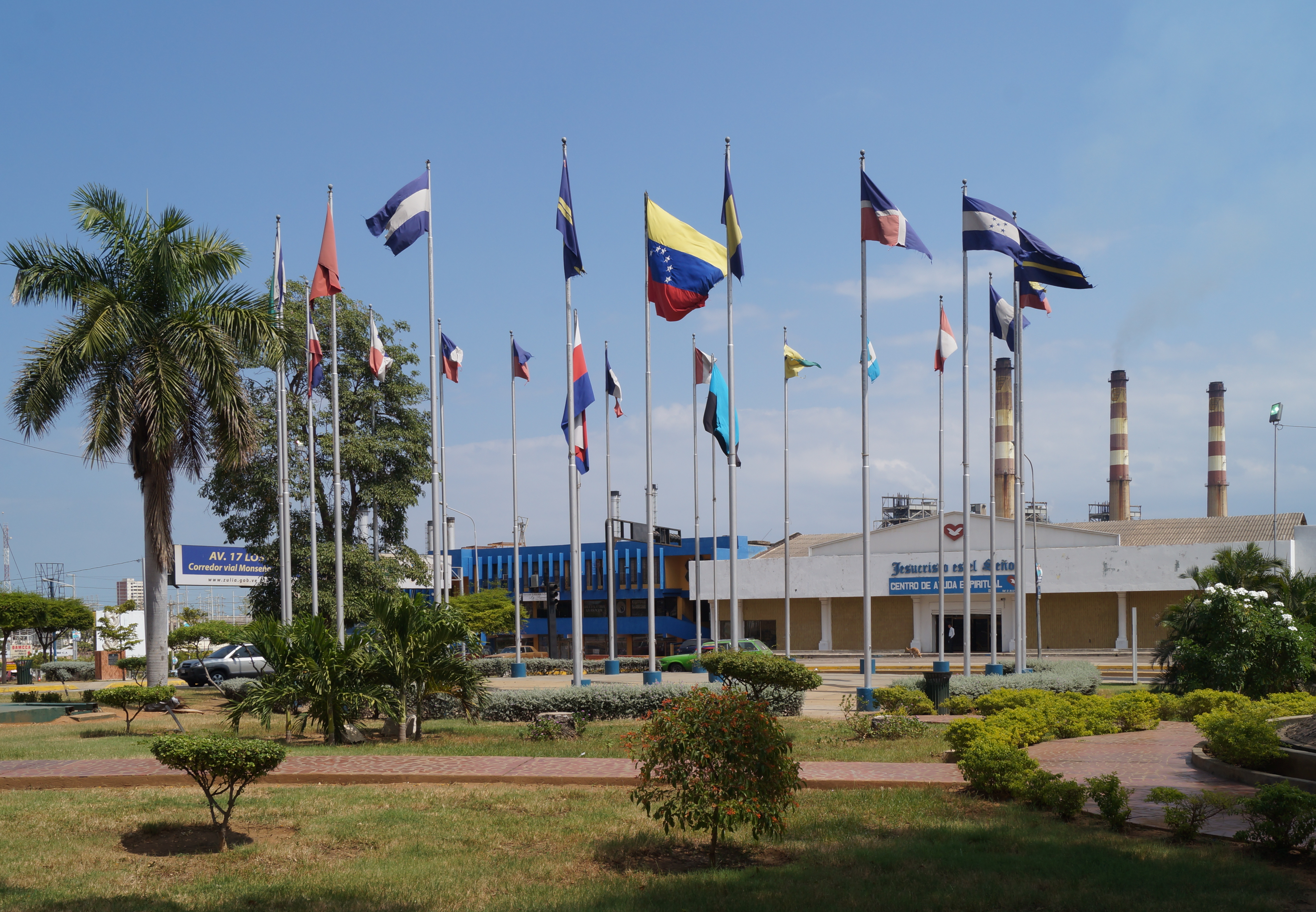
- Plaza Las Banderas, on the boundary between San Francisco and Maracaibo

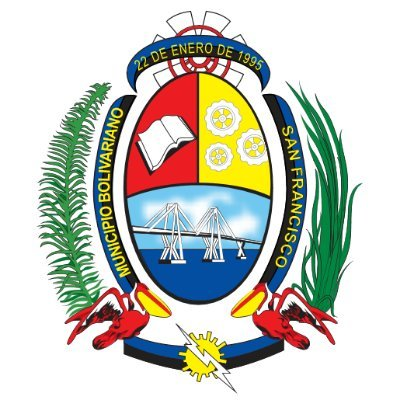
- Flag Coat of arms

- Location of San Francisco in Zulia and Venezuela
- Coordinates: 10.56°N 71.64°W
- Country: Venezuela
- State: Zulia
- Created: 22 January 1995
- Capital: San Francisco

Government
  - Mayor: Héctor Soto López

Area
  - Total: 185 km^{2} (71 sq mi)

Population (2011)
  - Total: 446,757
  - Density: 2,410/km^{2} (6,250/sq mi)
- Time zone: UTC−4 (VET)
- Website: Official website

San Francisco is a municipality in the metropolitan area of Maracaibo, Venezuela's second largest city. San Francisco covers an area of 185 square kilometres (71 sq mi) and recorded a population of 446,757 in the 2011 Venezuelan census.

== Geography ==
San Francisco is situated on the Maracaibo Plain on the west shore of Tablazo Strait, which connects Lake Maracaibo with the Caribbean Sea. It borders the municipalities of Maracaibo to the north, Jesús Enrique Lossada to the west, and La Cañada de Urdaneta to the south.

San Francisco has a semi-arid climate, with an average annual temperature of 27.8 °C and annual rainfall of 700 mm.

== History ==
In his 1830 atlas of Venezuela, Agustín Codazzi recorded a Punta de San Francisco located between the towns of Maracaibo and La Cañada. San Francisco was first officially recorded as the name of a parroquia in 1881. The current municipality was created on 22 January 1995 from the parroquias of San Francisco, Francisco Ochoa, Marcial Hernandez, and Domitila Flores, all previously part of the municipality of Maracaibo.

== Government ==
The following people have served as mayor (alcalde) of San Francisco:

- Saady Bijani, 1995–2008
- Omar Prieto, 2008–2017
- Dirwings Arrieta, 2017–2021

=== Subdivisions ===
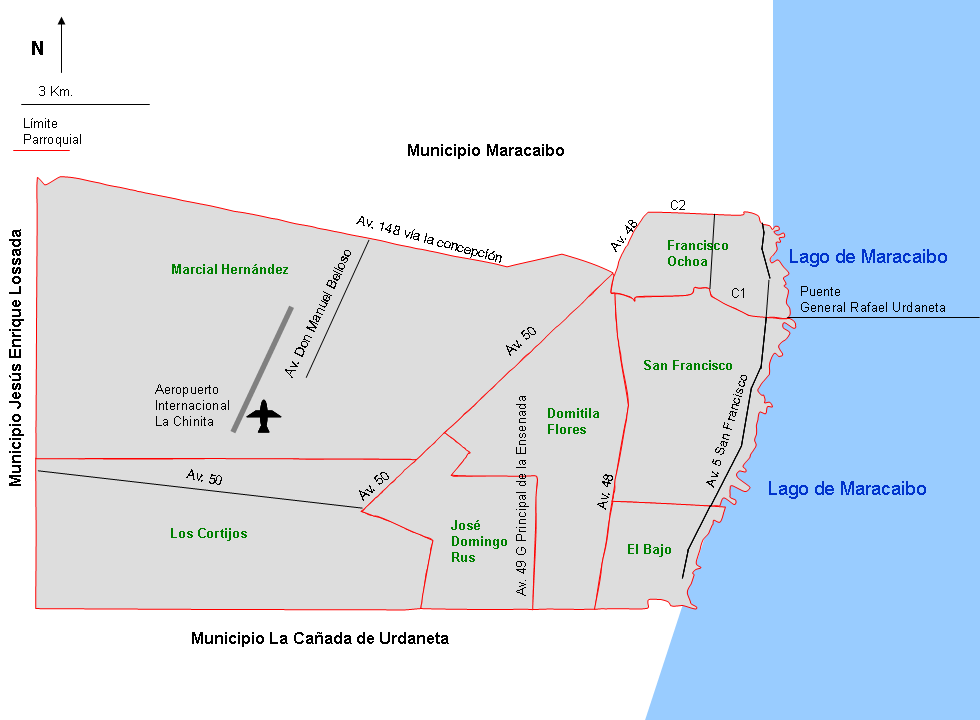
Map of the parroquias and major streets in the municipality of San Francisco.

San Francisco is divided into seven parroquias, of which San Francisco serves as the capital of the municipality. The newest parroquia is José Domingo Rus, which was created in 2006.

Parroquia	Population (2011 census)
San Francisco	126,852
El Bajo	18,554
Domitila Flores	124,247
Francisco Ochoa	49,088
Los Cortijos	32,197
Marcial Hernández	33,248
José Domingo Rus	62,571

== Economy ==
San Francisco is highly urbanized and its economy is sustained by secondary and tertiary activities. Major industries include coal, oil, cement, and fish processing.

== Infrastructure ==
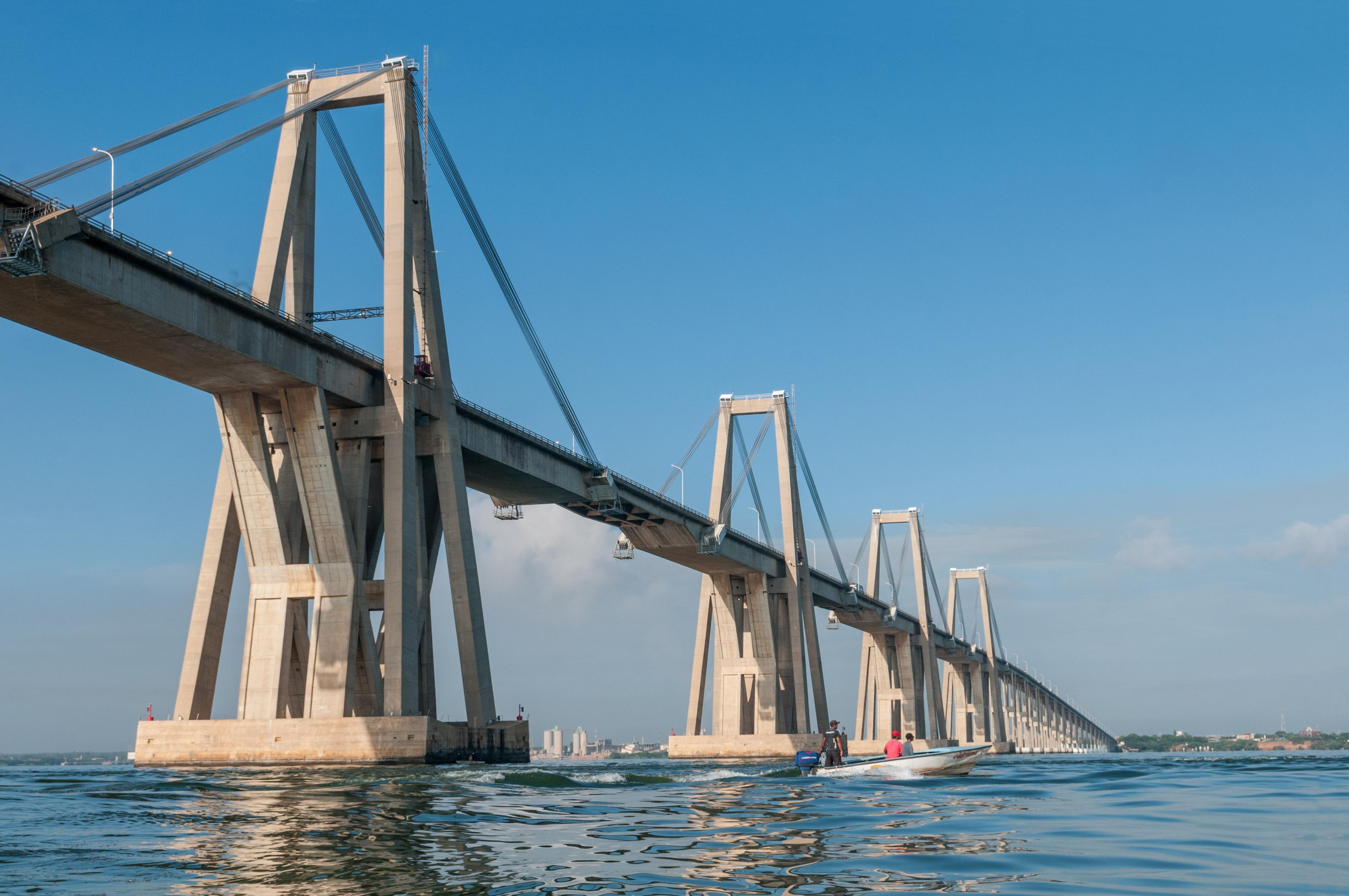
The General Rafael Urdaneta Bridge, which connects San Francisco with Santa Rita on the other side of the Tablazo Strait.

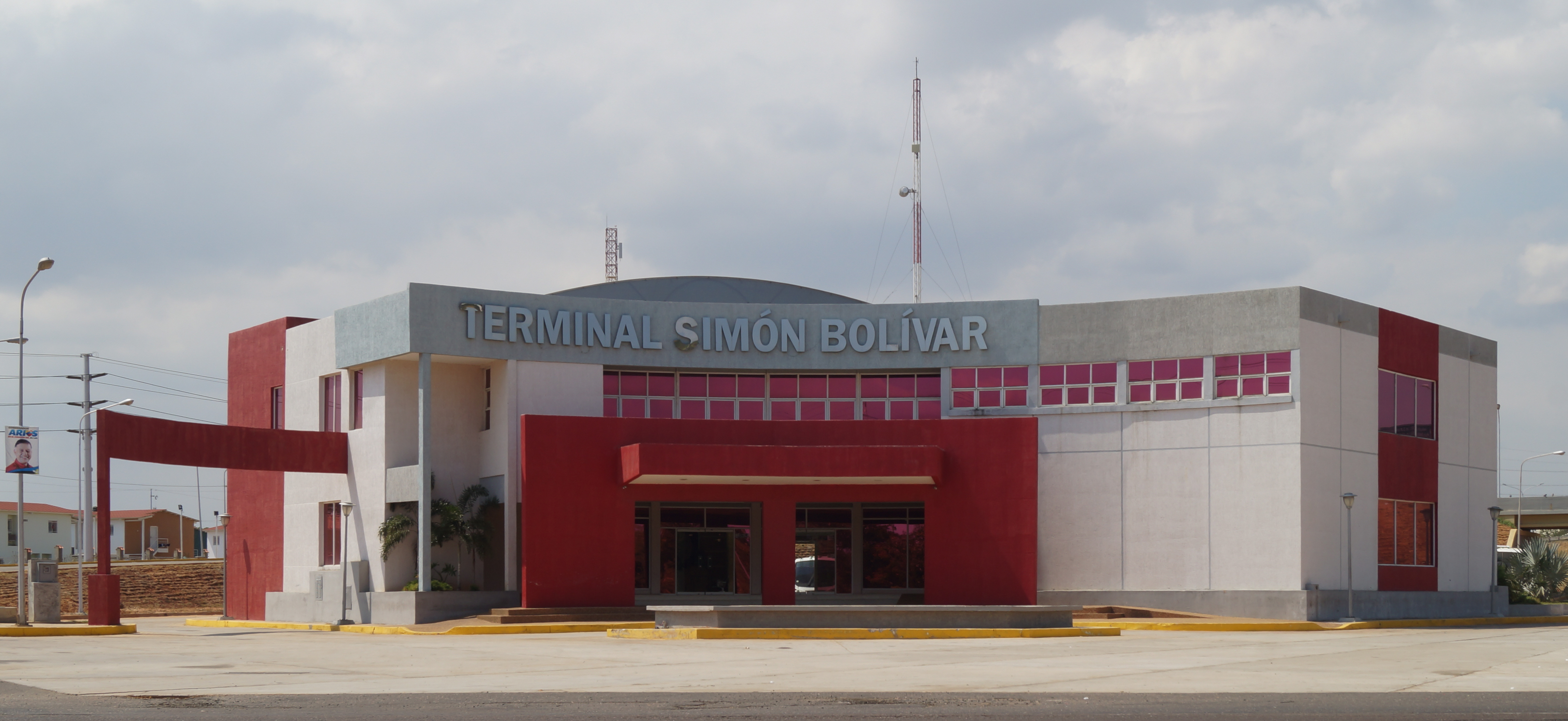
The Simón Bolívar bus terminal.

San Francisco is the western terminus of the Troncal 3 highway, which crosses the Tablazo Strait over the General Rafael Urdaneta Bridge and connects Maracaibo to Coro, the capital of Falcón, and the town of Morón in Carabobo. San Francisco also lies on the Troncal 6 highway, which runs north-south through Zulia from the border crossing to Colombia at Paraguachón to La Fría in Táchira.

Intercity buses stop at the Simón Bolívar bus terminal at the interchange of Troncal 3 with Avenida 5. The bus terminal is also the terminus of a circular bus route which serves San Francisco and is operated by Maracaibo's Metromara bus system.

La Chinita International Airport, which serves the Maracaibo area, is located in San Francisco.

The municipality has two hospitals.

Recreational areas in San Francisco include the Zulia Metropolitan Zoo and a botanical garden.
