= Jorge Sutherland =

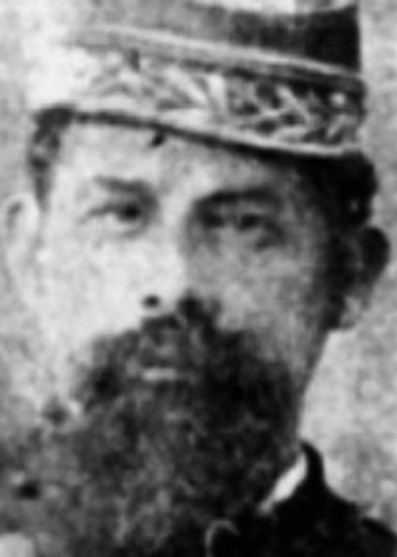

Jorge Sutherland (1825 – July 2, 1909) was the leader of the Venezuelan state of Zulia. He was an associate of Venezuelan president Juan Crisóstomo Falcón. He was born in 1825. He died in Maracaibo July 2, 1900.

Sutherland was the son of British consul to Maracaibo Robert Sutherland Jr. and grandson of Robert Sutherland (died 1819) a merchant who was a supporter of Simon Bolivar.
