= Francisco Arias Cárdenas =

Venezuelan politician and career military officer

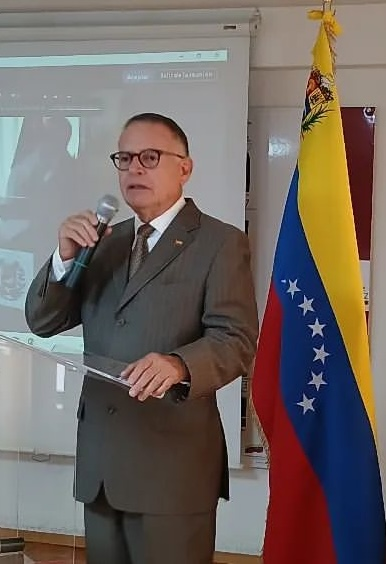
- Arias Cardenas in 2024

Member of the National Assembly of Venezuela
- Incumbent
- Assumed office 5 January 2026
- Constituency: National List
- In office 5 January 2011 – 20 December 2012
- Constituency: Zulia

Governor of Zulia
- In office 20 December 2012 – 26 October 2017
- Preceded by: Pablo Pérez Álvarez
- Succeeded by: Juan Pablo Guanipa
- In office 23 January 1996 – March 2000
- Preceded by: Lolita Aniyar de Castro
- Succeeded by: Manuel Rosales

Venezuela Ambassador to Mexico
- In office 6 April 2019 – 26 November 2024
- President: Nicolás Maduro
- Preceded by: María Lourdes Urbaneja
- Succeeded by: Stella Lugo

Personal details
- Born: 20 November 1950 (age 75) San Cristóbal, Táchira State, Venezuela
- Party: United Socialist Party of Venezuela (2007–2026); MVR (2006–2007); Unión (2001–2004)
- Education: Military Academy of Venezuela, Andes University, Javeriana University
- Profession: Army officer Politician

Francisco Javier Arias Cárdenas (born 20 November 1950) is a Venezuelan politician and career military officer, and was the governor of Zulia state. He participated in Hugo Chávez's unsuccessful February 1992 coup attempt, being pardoned in 1994 by Rafael Caldera, along with the other conspirators. He was elected Governor of Zulia state in 1995 for the Radical Cause, and challenged Hugo Chávez for the presidency in 2000. He subsequently served as Venezuelan Ambassador to the UN, and deputy to the National Assembly after the 2010 parliamentary elections.

== Background and military career ==
Born at San Cristóbal in Táchira, Arias graduated from the Venezuelan Academy of Military Sciences in Caracas, the Universidad de Los Andes in Mérida, and the Pontifical Xavierian University in Bogotá, Colombia.

Arias joined Hugo Chávez's clandestine organization, the MBR-200, in 1985, and with Chávez went on to lead a coup attempt against the government of Carlos Andrés Pérez on 4 February 1992. Arias was in charge of the battalion that took over the city of Maracaibo. Despite the success of Arias' battalion, the coup failed when Chávez surrendered to the government. Arias was detained and imprisoned until 1994, when he was pardoned by Rafael Caldera.

== Political career ==
In 1993, Arias split with Chávez and left the MBR-200, disagreeing with the group's then-strategy of electoral abstentionism. In 1995, Arias ran for governor of Zulia State, as a candidate of Radical Cause. When preliminary results showed the candidate of Acción Democrática winning, people rioted. Things returned to normal later the same day after a final recount of the votes showed Arias as the winner of the election. In 1998, Arias supported Chávez in his bid for the presidency, while he ran again for the governorship of Zulia. Both won their respective elections.

Over time, Arias became critical of Chávez' policies and actions. In 2000, when new presidential elections were called following the approval of a new constitution, Arias contested the election against Chávez. He was supported by a faction of the MBR-200 that had separated with Chávez following the inauguration of the 1999 constitution and claimed to be the "authentic" part of the Bolivarian movement. Arias lost the 2000 election but remained in politics at the head of his newly formed political party, Partido Unión.

On 4 February 2006, Chávez announced that Arias would be rejoining his government. On 1 May 2006, Arias was designated Venezuela's ambassador to the UN. In 2010 Arias was elected to represent Zulia state as a deputy to the National Assembly in the 2010 parliamentary elections.

In 2012, the United Socialist Party of Venezuela (Partido Socialista Unido de Venezuela / PSUV) selected Arias as its gubernatorial candidate for Zulia. He was elected governor of Zulia State with 52.99% of the vote.

Since 2019, he serves as Venezuela's ambassador to Mexico.

== Notes ==
Government offices
Preceded by Pablo Pérez Álvarez	Governor of Zulia; 2012 – 2017	Succeeded by Juan Pablo Guanipa
Preceded by Lolita Aniyar de Castro	Governor of Zulia; 1996 – 2000	Succeeded by Manuel Rosales
