= Union Party (Venezuela) =

Union Party Partido Unión
- Leader: Francisco Arias Cardenas
- Founded: 2001
- Dissolved: December 2006
- Merged into: United Socialist Party of Venezuela
- Ideology: Social democracy Progressivism
- Political position: Centre-left

Website
- Official Site (Archived)

Union Party (Spanish: Partido Unión) was a Venezuelan centre-left political party founded in 2001 by Francisco Arias Cárdenas. It was dissolved in 2007 after merging with PSUV. Throughout its existence Union opposed and then supported the candidacy of Hugo Chávez on various occasions.

== History ==
The party was founded after the general elections of 2000 with the intention of bringing together the large numbers of people who had voted for Francisco Arias Cárdenas. At the beginning of its existence the party was clearly opposed to President Hugo Chávez, to the point that it managed to concentrate former anti-chavista members of Movement for Socialism to their party. Some of the party members became involved in the 2002 Venezuelan coup attempt against Hugo Chávez, fracturing the newly founded party.

In the regional elections of 2004 the fracture within the party became increasingly evident, when Francisco Arias Cárdenas decided to start his candidacy for the governorship of Zulia and not support the alliance with Manuel Rosales, as well as the support for the official candidate Florencio Porras of the Fifth Republic Movement. He also denied the victory of Hugo Chávez in the 2004 presidential recall referendum declaring that a fraud had taken place.

However, after multiple compromises between Arias and Chávez, the Union became part of the government coalition, supporting the Fifth Republic Movement in all regional circuits. The section of the party opposed to the alliance with Chávez decided to rejoin the Movement for Socialism. In the presidential elections of December 2006, Union obtained 28,928 votes (0.25%) for the Hugo Chávez. At the end of December 2006, Union announced their dissolution and merger with the United Socialist Party of Venezuela.
