= Juan Pablo Guanipa =

Venezuelan lawyer and politician

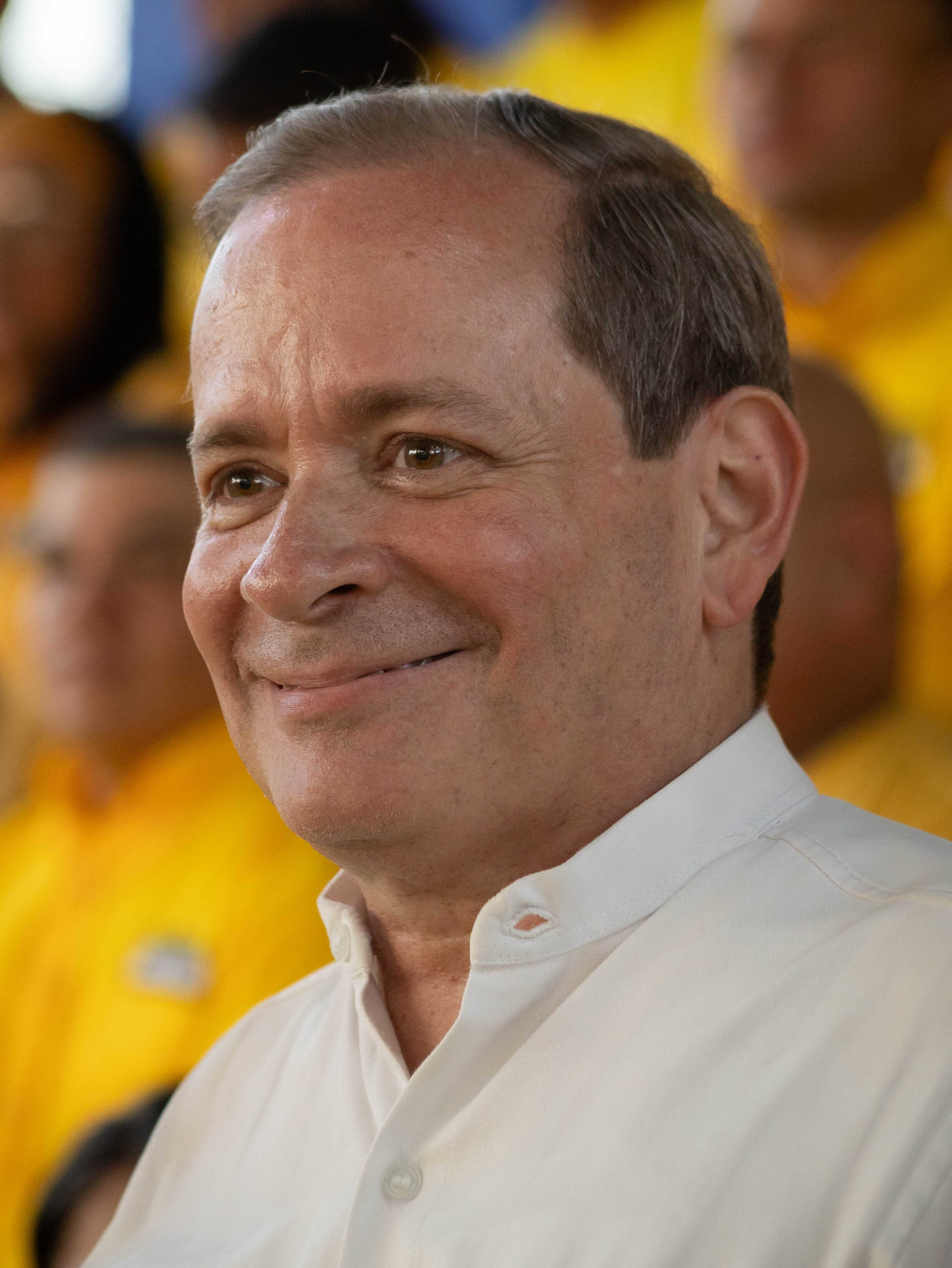
- Guanipa at the Primero Justicia event in Maracaibo, Zulia State, in 2026

First Vice President of the National Assembly of Venezuela
- In office 5 January 2020 – 5 January 2021
- President: Juan Guaidó (disputed)
- Preceded by: Edgar Zambrano
- Succeeded by: Iris Varela

Deputy of the National Assembly for Zulia State
- In office 5 January 2016 – 5 January 2021

Governor of Zulia
- In office 15 October 2017 – 26 October 2017
- Preceded by: Francisco Arias Cárdenas
- Succeeded by: Magdely Valbuena (interim); Omar Prieto

Councilor of Maracaibo
- In office 7 August 2005 – 8 December 2013

Deputy of the Legislative Council of Zulia
- In office 23 January 1993 – 23 January 1996

Personal details
- Born: Juan Pablo Isidoro Guanipa Villalobos; 20 December 1964 (age 61) Maracaibo, Zulia, Venezuela
- Party: Copei (1983–1999); Justice First (2003–present)
- Education: University of Zulia
- Occupation: Lawyer, politician

Juan Pablo Isidoro Guanipa Villalobos (born 20 December 1964) is a Venezuelan lawyer and politician who served as deputy and First Vice President of the National Assembly, and leader of the Justice First political party. His 2017 election as governor of Zulia was controversially annulled by the national government after Guanipa refused to take an oath imposed on candidates after the election. He was a presidential candidate in the 2018 Venezuelan presidential election until the opposition decided to boycott the election. Guanipa was also the regional coordinator of the Justice First party in Zulia and chair of the Maracaibo Posible foundation. After months of harassment by the government, Guanipa was detained by the Maduro government in May 2025. He was released in 8 February 2026, but hours later, he was kidnapped by armed men and an order of house arrest was filed by Venezuelan authorities. After house arrest at his residence in Maracaibo, he was released under a general amnesty law on February 19, 2026.

== Personal life ==
=== Early years ===
He is the third of seven brothers, six boys and one woman, children of: Corina Villalobos de Guanipa and father Manuel Guanipa Matos, a Zulian politician, leader of Copei. At 13 years he worked as a clerk in a bookstore, where his young age stood out receiving recognition as owner of the best store clerk. He is the brother of Tomás Guanipa, also a deputy for Zulia and Secretary General of Justice First.

He served as a student leader and union representative of the employees of the Judicial District of Zulia.

=== Education ===
He studied Basic and Diversified Education at the Liceo Los Robles de Maracaibo and graduated as a Bachelor of Humanities from the Colegio San Vicente de Paúl.

He is a lawyer, graduated from the University of Zulia in 1990. After receiving the university degree, he continued a rigorous training process in the political and community area, as well as in the area of public management, citizen participation and leadership.

In 1991, he completed the IV International Senior Management Course offered by the Latin American Institute for Social Research in Caracas. In 1997, he participated in the Leadership and Vision Program offered by the Center for the Dissemination of Economic Knowledge (CEDICE) in Caracas. In the same year, he studied the Advanced Program of Government Sciences and Techniques sponsored by the Institute of Higher Administration Studies (IESA) in Maracaibo.

In 2002, he completed the Master in Applied Political Studies offered by the International Foundation for Ibero-America of Administration and Public Policies in Madrid, Spain, obtaining with cum laude honors.

== Political career ==
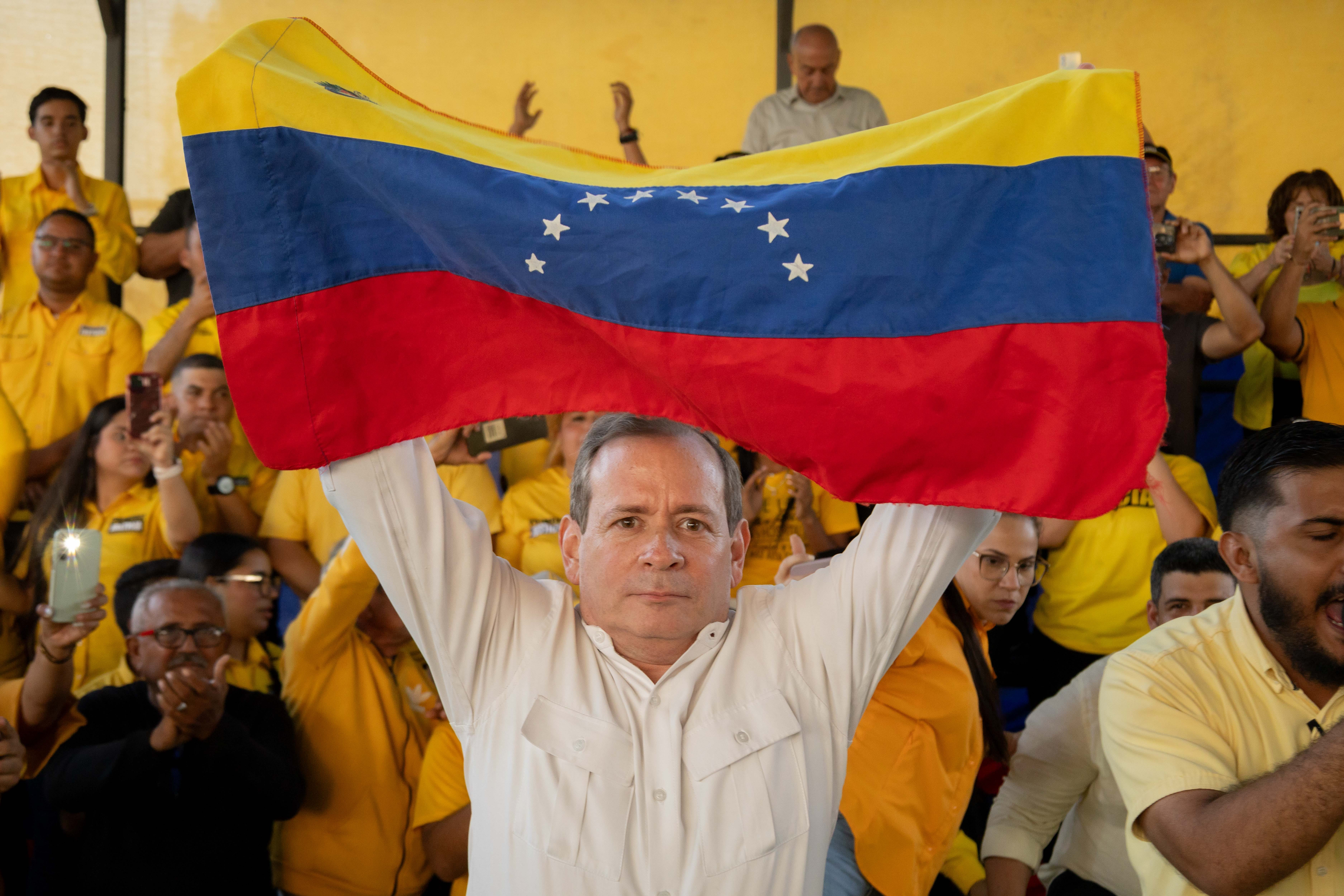
Guanipa holds the Venezuelan flag at the Primero Justicia event in Maracaibo, Zulia State

Guanipa joined politics with Rafael Caldera's presidential campaign in the 1983 presidential election, thereby entering the Copei party.

He was elected as a deputy to the Legislative Assembly of the Zulia State by Copei for the period 1994 to 1996, serving as President of the Legislation and Policy Commissions and as Vice President of the Sports, Recreation and Tourism and Regional Planning and Development Commissions. From February 1999 to March 2003, he served as General Director of the Regional Institute for Training and Sociopolitical and Sociocultural Studies for the Promotion of Man (IRFES), an institution located in Maracaibo, Zulia State. After the 1999 constitutional process, leaving Copei and from 2003 is part of Primero Justicia.

He was popularly elected as Alternate Deputy to the National Assembly for the period 2000 to 2005. He was popularly elected to carry out the position of Councilor of the Maracaibo Municipality in the period 2005–2009, but his performance extended for a further period, until 2013, as a consequence of the electoral body not calling the respective process. During that time he chaired the Legislation and Drafting Commission of that legislative body.

During the 2015 Venezuelan parliamentary election, he was elected as a deputy for his home state, Zulia.

He served as a councilor of Maracaibo for two continuous periods between 2005 and 2013. In 2015, he was elected deputy to the Venezuelan National Assembly until the end of 2017 when he separated from office to run as governor, where he was elected, however, unable to assuming his mandate before the refusal of the Zulia State Legislative Council (CLEZ) of an official majority to swear him in because he did not subordinate himself to the ANC (by the same request of this instance that was called and installed controversially), he returns to his seat in the national parliament in 2018. After that, the president of the CLEZ of the time Magdely Valbuena was appointed interim governor until new elections were held, which were scheduled for December 2017, where the official candidate Omar Prieto is elected.

=== 2017 regional elections ===
Guanipa was a candidate for governor of his state, a place that got winning the primary election of officers of the Unit, facing the mayor of Maracaibo, Eveling Trejo de Rosales on 10 September 2017.

On 15 October 2017, during the regional elections, he was elected Governor of Zulia state, declared the winner with 691,547 votes and 51.06%. Arias Cárdenas, his opponent obtained 631,594 votes.

==== Dismissal as Governor of Zulia ====
Guanipa was prevented from taking office after refusing to swear an oath before President Nicolás Maduro's National Constituent Assembly, which he considered illegitimate. On 26 October 2017, the Legislative Council of Zulia dismissed Guanipa as the governor and Magdely Valbuena was appointed as interim governor. The council declared that Guanipa; "By not taking the oath, he creates the absolute lack of office".

=== 2018 presidential election ===
On 26 January 2018, his brother and secretary general of Primero Justicia, Tomás Guanipa, communicated the possibility that Juan Pablo Guanipa was the party's presidential candidate – despite the fact that he could nominate Henrique Capriles Radonski for the third time in future elections of the Democratic Unity Roundtable (MUD) primaries. Guanipa declared in November 2017 would not rule out taking such responsibility within PJ and compete for the nomination of the opposition coalition. However, on 19 February 2018, Justice First (PJ), Democratic Action and Popular Will (VP), announced they would not participate in presidential elections and expressed their rejection of the National Electoral Council, ruling out any intention of Guanipa in the electoral race.

=== 2020 Venezuelan National Assembly Delegated Committee election ===
Alternate deputy of Guanipa, José Sánchez "Mazuco", announced in the day of the election that he was operated and hospitalized, so he would not be able to attend to the session, but assured that his vote would not make a difference since the main deputy Guanipa would attend instead.

After being blocked from entering the Palacio Federal Legislativo on 5 January 2020, Juan Guaidó announced that a separate session of the National Assembly would happen in the building of El Nacional, a Venezuelan newspaper. National Assembly deputies signed their names on an attendance list upon entering the facility. Guanipa and Carlos Berrizbeitia were elected as first and second vice-presidents, respectively, taking oath at the scene. Several deputies abroad followed and endorsed the vote remotely from Madrid, Spain.

== 2025 arrest and detention ==
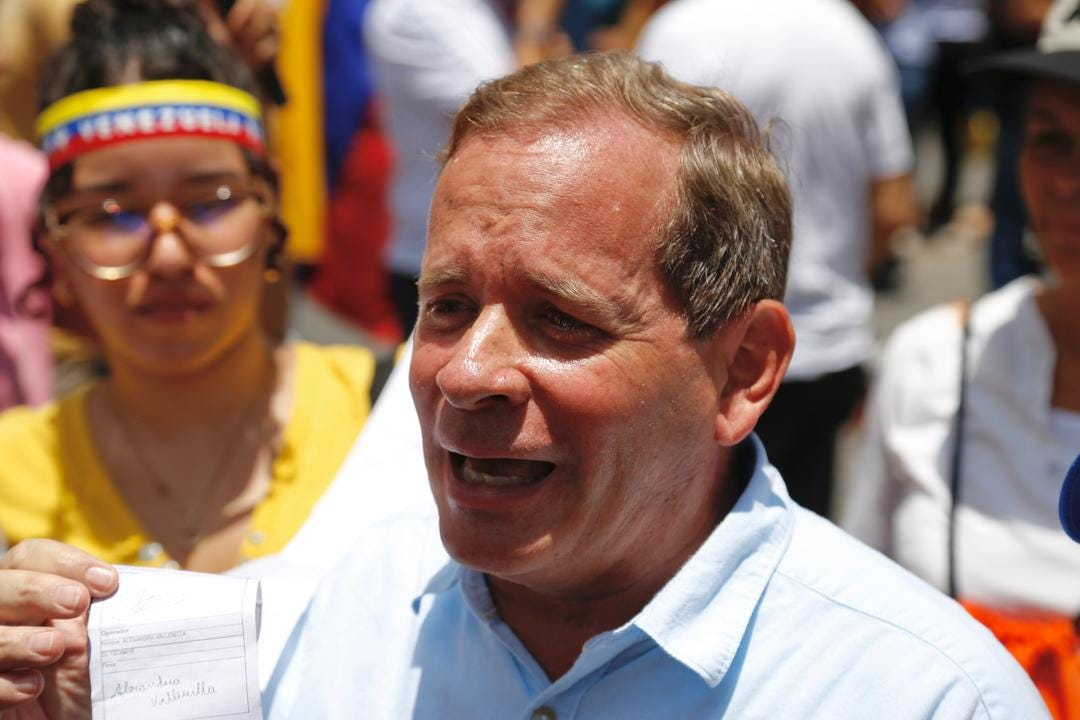
Guanipa joining the democratic opposition in Caracas to demand recognition of the July 28 presidential election results.

In October 2024, the Inter-American Commission on Human Rights warned that Guanipa faced "irreparable harm" from ongoing government harassment. Guanipa was arrested on 23 May 2025, days before regional and parliamentary elections, by Venezuelan security forces. His son, Ramón Guanipa Linares, reported that security forces had raided his father's location at 2:00 A.M. that day, breaking down his door and taking him to prison. This arrest came in the wake of the disputed 2024 presidential election, the Maduro government detained nearly 2,500 people amid widespread allegations of electoral fraud, while several other prominent opposition figures remained imprisoned. After his arrest, Guanipa was charged with allegedly leading a terrorist plot and conspiring with the United States to boycott elections and overthrow the government of Nicolás Maduro, commit acts of terrorism, and attack Venezuela's power grid. He is also charged with money laundering and inciting hatred.

His arrest was described by his political ally María Corina Machado as a kidnapping and an act of state terrorism, saying that the Venezuelan government is "desperately looking for her", as she continues in hiding. US Secretary of State Marco Rubio also condemned Guanipa's arrest as "unjustified and arbitrary", called for his release and for the restoration of democracy in Venezuela.

=== 2026 release ===
In January 2026, following the capture of Maduro and the installation of Delcy Rodríguez as interim leader, expectations rose that political prisoners would be released. Although officials announced more than one hundred such prisoners would be freed, human rights groups counted far fewer, and Guanipa remained among those still detained. He was eventually released in 8 February 2026, and made a public statement calling for new elections in the country, but was abducted in Caracas hours later. The Public Prosecutor's Office later said that Guanipa was detained for violating the conditions of his release and would be placed under house arrest. In response to these events, United States Senator Rick Scott released a video addressed to the Venezuelan government stating:

Right after you released Juan Pablo Guanipa, you rearrested him. That's not the deal. The deal is you release the political prisoners and you cooperate with the United States and you stop oppressing these people.

On 10 February, Guanipa was formally placed under house arrest in Maracaibo. After the approval of the amnesty bill on 19 February, Guanipa was released from house arrest.
