= Lewis Pérez =

Venezuelan politician (1944–2019)

Senator of Venezuela
- In office 23 January 1994 – 23 January 1999

Personal details
- Born: Lewis Alberto Pérez Daboin; 11 December 1944 Valera, Venezuela
- Died: 3 August 2019 (aged 74) Caracas, Venezuela
- Party: Democratic Action
- Spouse: Antonieta Boschetti
- Children: 3
- Education: Central University of Venezuela
- Occupation: Politician

Lewis Pérez (11 December 1944 – 3 August 2019) was a Venezuelan politician who served as a senator.

== Biography ==
He was married to Antonieta Boschetti Manrique for 31 years and had three children: Rosana, Daniel Enrique and José Daniel. He studied medicine at the Central University of Venezuela, obtaining a specialization in 1970.

His political career began in 1975 when he was elected Deputy to Congress by Trujillo State. Then, in 1989, he was again elected as Deputy for his State, acting on that occasion as a member of the Permanent Finance Commission. In the 1993 parliamentary election, he was elected Senator by the Trujillo state, for the period 1994-1999, integrating the Defense Commission of the Congress.

In 1997, he joined the National Executive Committee for Democratic Action (DA), as Secretary of Organization, and appears as a candidate for the 1998 election, in 1995 he appears as one of the candidates in an internal survey, promoting the transformation of DA into the Betancourt party. On 28 November 1998 assumes as Secretary General of his party, Accion Democratica this because withdraw its support for the candidacy of Luis Alfaro Ucero General Secretary of DA, who refused and was expelled from the party. In 2000, delivers the secretary general Henry Ramos Allup.

He died on 3 August 2019.
