= Zulia Metropolitan Zoo =

Zulia Metropolitan Zoo Parque zoológico metropolitano del Zulia
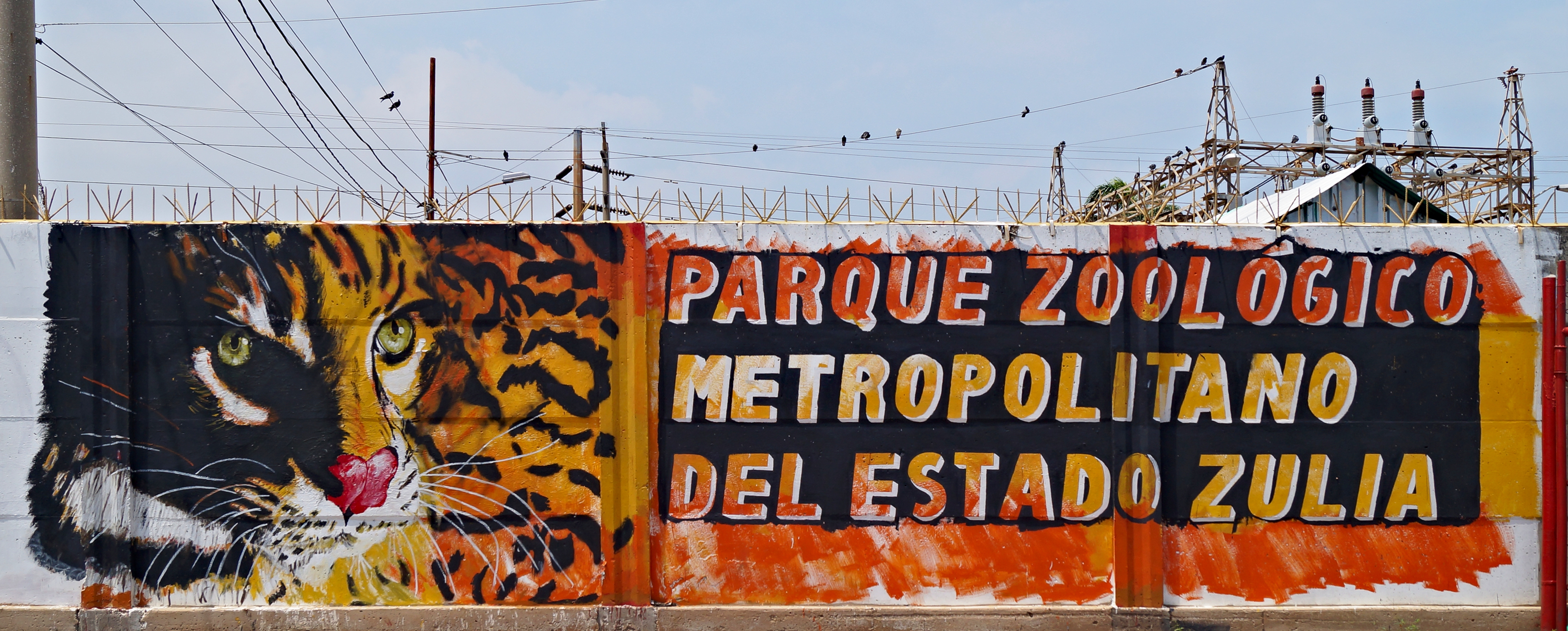
- Interactive map of Zulia Metropolitan Zoo; Parque zoológico metropolitano del Zulia
- 10°32′18″N 71°38′28″W
- Date opened: 1973
- Location: Maracaibo, Venezuela
- Land area: 40 ha

The Zulia Metropolitan Zoo (Spanish: Parque zoológico metropolitano del Zulia; also called the Zoological Park of Zulia or Parque del Sur) is a zoo established in 1973. It spans about 40 hectares and is located at kilometer 10 of the La Cañada highway in the municipality of San Francisco, south of Maracaibo, the capital of Zulia in Venezuela. Its administration and management since 2008 are the responsibility of the Zulia state government.

The zoo faces constant problems such as drought and lack of resources in the area, which may affect species such as felines (leopards, lions, and jaguars), rhinos, and orangutans, among others.

Between 1973 and 1993, Zulia was controlled by the governorship of Zulia, a situation that was interrupted between that last year and 2008, when it was finally returned to its original administrators.

== See also ==
- List of national parks of Venezuela
- Loefling Zoo
