= Henry Ramos Allup =

Venezuelan politician (born 1943)

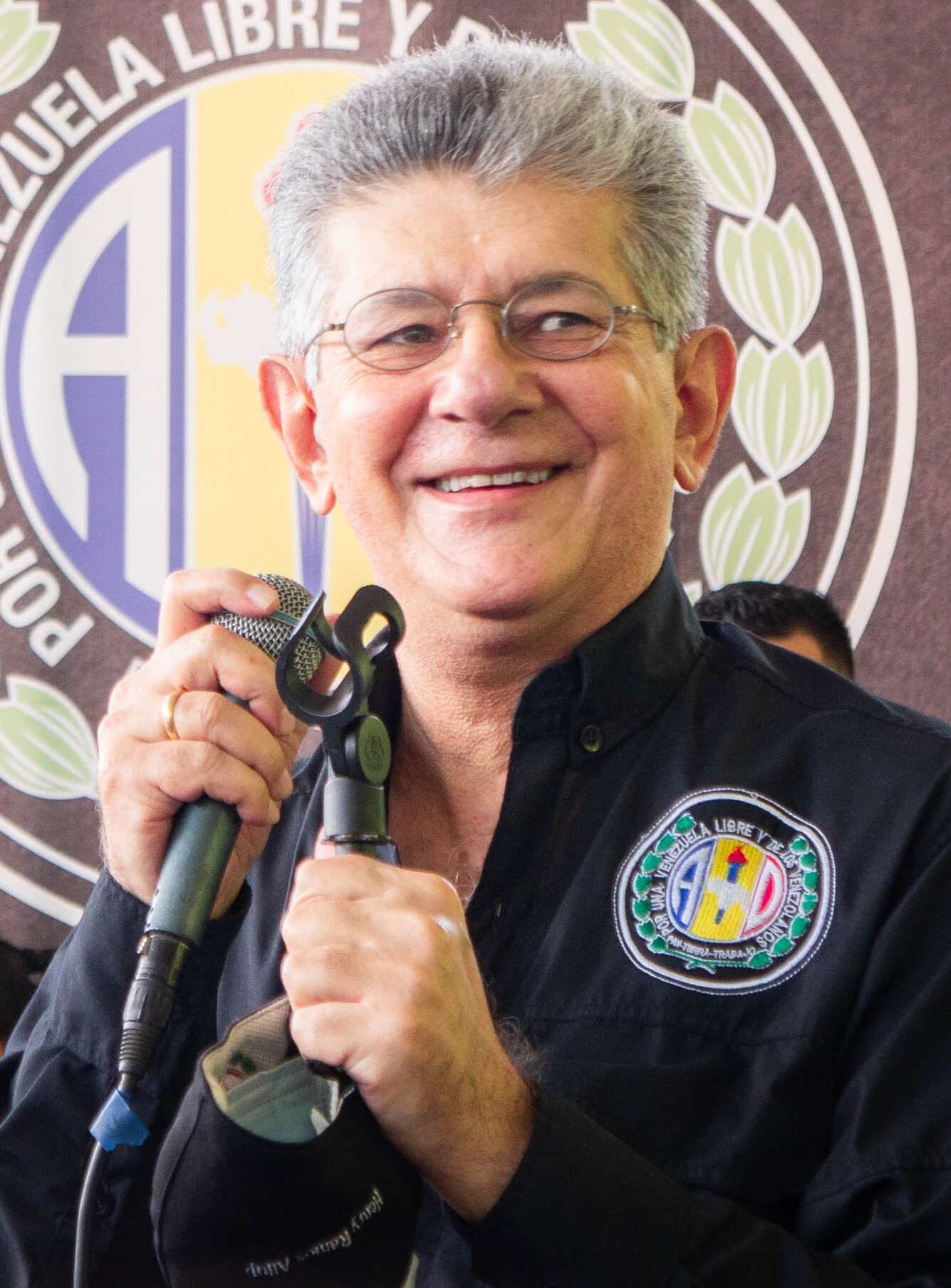
- Ramos Allup in 2021 during the activities for the 80th anniversary of Democratic Action

7th President of the National Assembly of Venezuela
- In office 5 January 2016 – 5 January 2017
- Preceded by: Diosdado Cabello
- Succeeded by: Julio Borges

Vice President of Socialist International
- Incumbent
- Assumed office 2 September 2012
- President: George Papandreou; Pedro Sánchez

Secretary-General of Democratic Action
- Incumbent
- Assumed office 2003
- President: Isabel Carmona de Serra
- Preceded by: Lewis Pérez

Deputy of the National Assembly for the Capital District
- In office 5 January 2011 – 5 January 2021
- In office 14 August 2000 – 5 January 2006

Deputy of Latin American Parliament for Venezuela
- In office 7 January 2011 – 5 January 2016

Member of the Chamber of Deputies for Carabobo State
- In office 23 January 1994 – 22 December 1999
- In office 23 January 1989 – 23 December 1993

Personal details
- Born: Henry Lisandro Ramos Allup; 17 October 1943 (age 83) Valencia, Carabobo, Venezuela
- Party: Democratic Action
- Other political affiliations: Democratic Unity Roundtable
- Spouse: Diana D'Agostino
- Children: 3
- Profession: Lawyer

Henry Lisandro Ramos Allup (born 17 October 1943) is a Venezuelan politician and lawyer who was born in Valencia, Carabobo. He has been leader of the social democratic Democratic Action party, holding the position of Secretary-General.

Ramos Allup was a deputy in the Legislative Assembly of Carabobo state, four times deputy of the extinct Congress, twice deputy of the National Assembly, which he presided over in 2015–2016, and representative of Venezuela in the Latin American Parliament.

== Early life ==
Henry Ramos was born on 17 October 1943 in Valencia, Carabobo, son of Amanda Allup de Ramos and Emilio Ramos Rachid. His father was a doctor and his mother was a housewife. Ramos Allup is a lawyer.

== Political career ==
=== Chamber of Deputies (1979–1999) ===
Ramos Allup was a member of the Legislative Council of the Carabobo state and a four-time deputy for Carabobo state in Congress. In 1992, he called in Congress for the suspension of democratic guarantees, during Pérez's government. He was deputy for the Democratic Action party in 1984, 1989, 1994, 1998 and 2000; in the first four instances he served as a deputy to the Congress, and in the last as a deputy to the National Assembly.

=== National Assembly (2000–2006) ===
In the 2000 elections he was elected deputy for the Caracas district, but, in line with the decision of the alliance of opposition parties, he did no stand for re-election in the parliamentary elections of 2005, with the intention of making known the distrust that existed at the time toward the electoral authority, the National Electoral Council.

In 2008 he brought his party comes to the Democratic Unity Roundtable, along with other parties like COPEI, Justice First, Project Venezuela, Fearless People's Alliance, Un Nuevo Tiempo, and others.

=== Latin American Parliament (2011–2016) ===
In the 2010 parliamentary elections, Ramos Allup was elected deputy for Venezuela for the Democratic Unity Roundtable to the Latin American Parliament, being sworn into that office on 7 January 2011.

In August 2012 he was elected vice president of the Socialist International.

=== National Assembly (2016–2021) ===
In 2016, following the victory of the Democratic Unity Roundtable (an electoral coalition of which Democratic Action is part) in the 2015 parliamentary election, Ramos Allup was chosen by members of the coalition to be President of the National Assembly. Ramos Allup's main promise was to achieve the removal of Nicolás Maduro within six months.

On October 24, 2017, the Assembly declared Maduro in "abandonment of office," and on the 27th of that month, Ramos Allup sent him a summons to appear before the legislative branch.

On January 5, 2017, he was succeeded as president of the Assembly by Julio Borges, of his political coalition MUD under the Primero Justicia party. That year, he supported Democratic Action's participation in the regional elections. On January 18, 2018, he announced his aspiration to be a candidate for the 2018 Venezuelan presidential elections, but he did not participate, arguing a lack of conditions and transparency in the electoral process. In July 2018, Democratic Action announced its withdrawal from the Democratic Unity Roundtable.

In May 2019, the Supreme Tribunal of Justice ordered the prosecution of seven National Assembly members for their actions during the failed uprising, including Ramos Allup.

=== Secretary-General of Democratic Action (2021–present) ===
In 2021, he defended the participation of the G4 faction in the regional elections with the Democratic Unity Roundtable ticket. In 2024, Ramos Allup was in favor of the cessation of the 2015 National Assembly. In 2025, he announced that Democratic Action would abstain from participating in the 2025 municipal and regional elections.

== Personal life ==
His first marriage took place in Valencia, and had he later married Diana D'Agostino, with whom he had three children. She is president of the Hatillana Foundation for the Care of Children and the Family (Fundhainfa) and was a candidate for mayor of El Hatillo municipality in Miranda state in 2013. His wife stated that their children emigrated to the United States for political reasons. His brothers-in-law are Francisco D'Agostino and Eladio Larez.

His son, Ricardo Ramos D'Agostino, obtained twelve contracts with PDVSA without bidding between 2009 and 2012. His brother‑in‑law, businessman Francisco D'Agostino, is a director of Derwick Associates, was sanctioned by the U. S. Department of the Treasury between 2021 and 2025 and was linked to Jeffrey Epstein, promising him in 2012 to personally introduce him to Ramos Allup and Alejandro Betancourt.

Political offices
Preceded by Diosdado Cabello	President of the National Assembly of Venezuela; 2016–2017	Succeeded by Julio Borges
