= Lolita Aniyar de Castro =

Venezuelan academic, lawyer, and politician

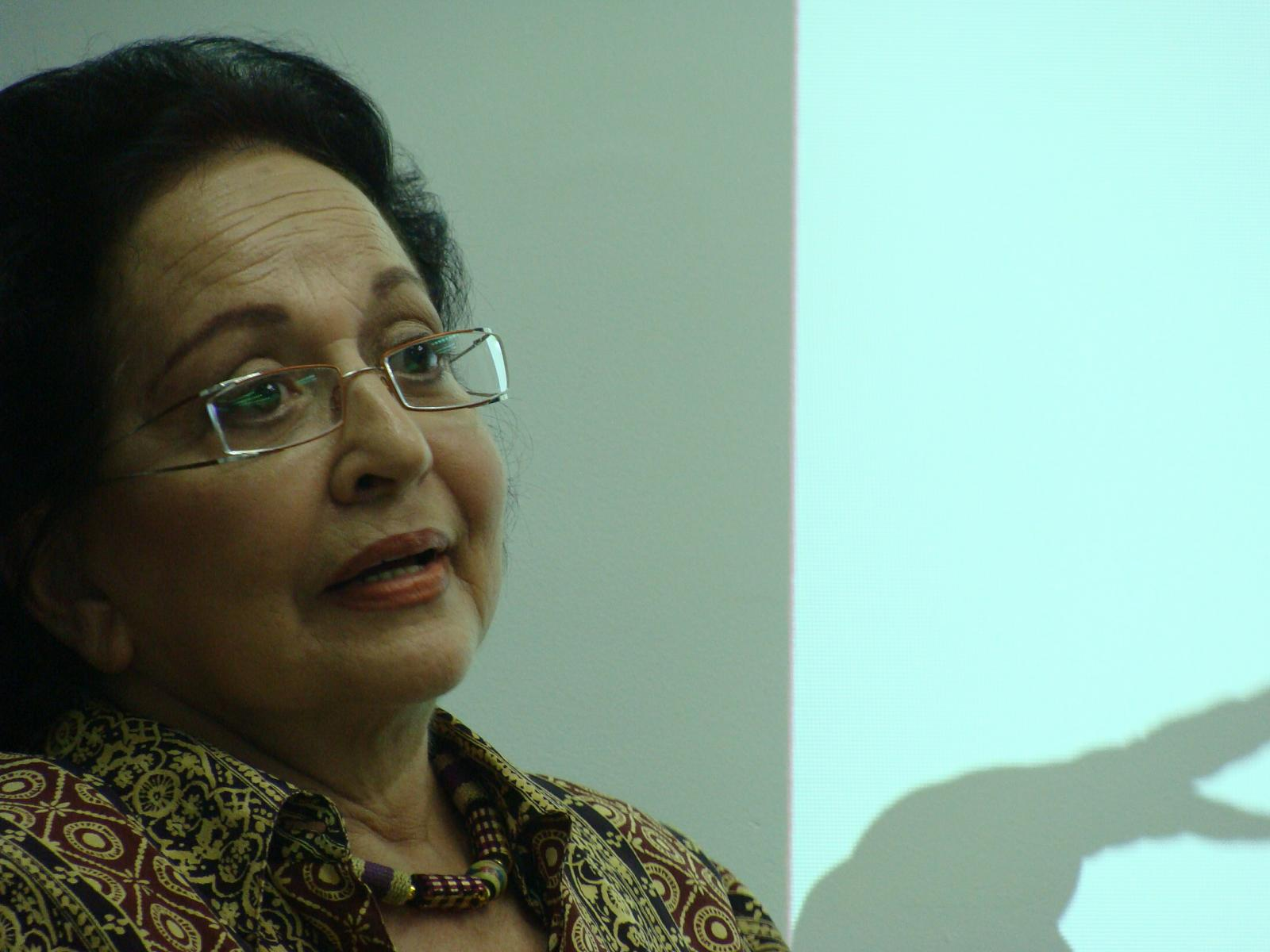
Lolita Aniyar de Castro in 2008

Lolita Aniyar de Castro (8 May 1937 – 7 December 2015) was a Venezuelan teacher, lawyer, politician, and criminologist.

== Biography ==
Aniyar was born in Caracas into a family of Moroccan-Jewish origin.

She served as a professor at Universidad del Zulia in the department of criminology, and for more than 15 years was director of the Institute of Criminology there, which now bears her name. She taught in graduate school at the Universidad de los Andes, as well as other universities in Argentina, Costa Rica, and Brazil, as well as other countries. She was appointed as governor of the State of Zulia on 2 February 1994, following the resignation of her predecessor, Oswaldo Álvarez Paz. Aniyar de Castro became the first Venezuelan woman to be elected to that position. Before that, she had already become the first woman to be elected deputy to the Legislative Assembly of the State of Zulia and the first female senator to the National Congress of Venezuela. She was the Delegate of Venezuela to UNESCO, and she became Consul of Venezuela in New Orleans, Louisiana. The Committee of Stockholm awarded her the International Prize of Criminology (equivalent to the Nobel Prize in Criminology). She also wrote numerous books on the criminal justice area and in Venezuela. She died on 7 December 2015 at the age of 78, as a result of a heart attack at her home in Maracaibo.

== Works ==
- Victimología (1967)
- Los Rostros de la Violencia, Vol I -Compilatorio (1974)
- Criminología de la reacción social (1976)
- Los Rostros de la Violencia, Vol II -Compilatorio (1977)
- Conocimiento y Orden social. Criminología como legitimación y Criminología de la Liberación (1981)
- Criminologia da Reação Social (1983)
- Criminología de la Liberación (1987)
- Democracia y Justicia Penal (1993)
- En guante de terciopelo (1993)
- El Zulia que queremos (1994)
- Secretos de Estado y Familia (1996)
- Entre la dominación y el miedo (2003)
- Resumen del Pensamiento criminológico y su reflejo institucional (2003)
- Criminología de los Derechos Humanos (2010)
- Manual de Criminología Sociopolítica -coautoriado con Rodrigo Codino (2013)
- La Lola, Lola (2015)
- Manual de Criminologia Sociopolítica (2016)
