= Julio Borges =

Venezuelan politician and lawyer (born 1969)

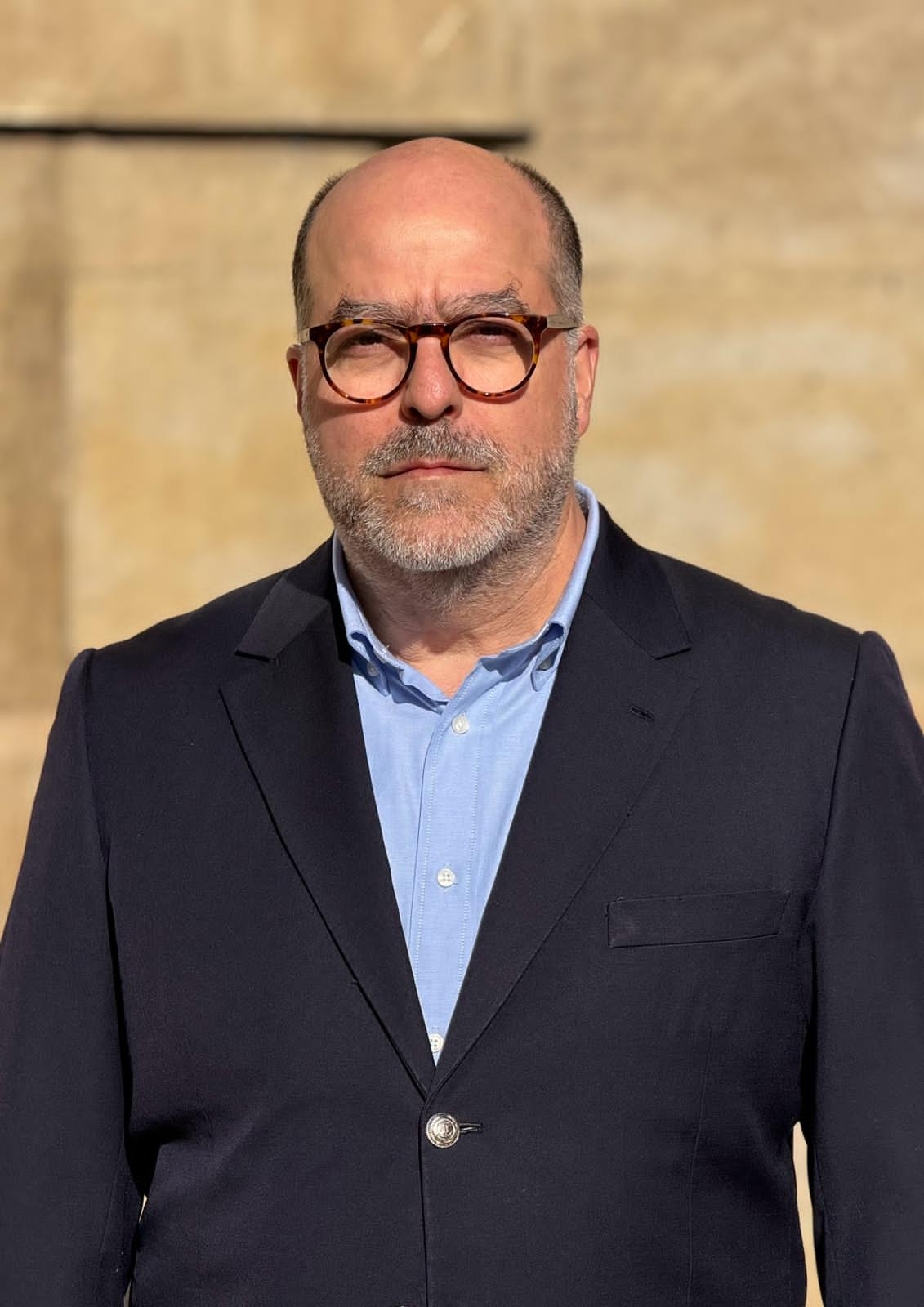
- Borges in 2024

Ambassador of Venezuela to the Lima Group
- In office 28 August 2019 – 5 December 2021
- Appointed by: National Assembly of Venezuela
- President: Juan Guaidó

8th President of the National Assembly
- In office 5 January 2017 – 5 January 2018
- Preceded by: Henry Ramos Allup
- Succeeded by: Omar Barboza

Deputy of the National Assembly for Miranda State
- In office 5 January 2011 – 8 August 2018
- In office 14 August 2000 – 5 January 2006

General Coordinator of Justice First
- In office 2 March 2000 – 24 September 2022
- Preceded by: Party established
- Succeeded by: María Beatriz Martínez (President)

Personal details
- Born: Julio Andrés Borges Junyent; 22 October 1969 (age 57) Caracas, Venezuela
- Party: Justice First
- Other political affiliations: Democratic Unity Roundtable
- Education: Andrés Bello Catholic University; Boston College; University of Oxford
- Awards: Sakharov Prize (2017)

Julio Andrés Borges Junyent (born 22 October 1969) is a Venezuelan politician and lawyer. In the late 1990s, Borges hosted a TV court show called "Justicia Para Todos" (Spanish: Justice for All) on Radio Caracas Televisión. He later co-founded the party Primero Justicia in 2000 along with Henrique Capriles and Leopoldo López.

== Early life and education ==
Borges studied law at the Andrés Bello Catholic University, graduating in 1992, and got a master's degree in philosophy at Boston College (1994) and public policy at the University of Oxford (1996). He is married, and has four children.

== Political career ==
=== National Assembly ===
In the 2000 parliamentary elections, Borges was elected to the National Assembly, representing Justice First and Miranda State until 2005. Justice First participated in the opposition boycott of the 2005 elections, but Borges was elected again in the parliamentary elections of 2010.

Borges ran for president in the opposition primaries for the Venezuelan presidential elections of 2006, but on 9 August 2006 dropped out to support Manuel Rosales, former governor of Zulia State. Borges was involved in an incident in the National Assembly in April 2013, when violence broke out between PSUV and opposition legislators following the 2013 presidential election. According to Borges, the members

of PSUV stood up at the beginning of the assembly and rushed the opposition.

=== Presidential commissioner for Foreign Affairs ===
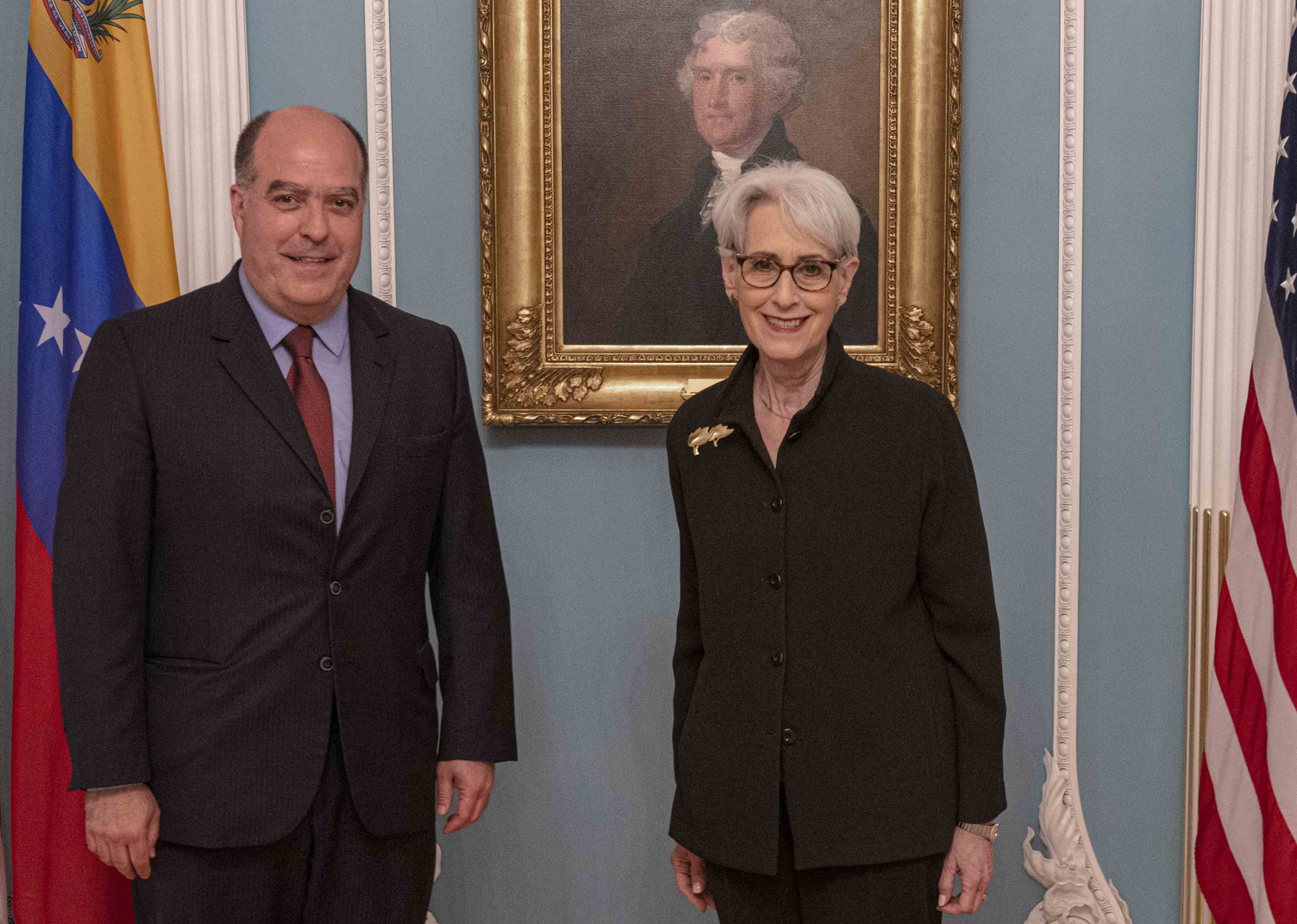
Borges meets with U.S. Deputy Secretary of State Wendy R. Sherman at the U.S. Department of State in Washington, D.C. in June 2021.

Julio Borges was designated on January 29, 2019, as Venezuela's representative before the Lima Group by Juan Guaidó, the opposition leader and partially recognized as president of the country. In August 2019, he was appointed presidential commissioner for Foreign Affairs by Guaidó within the newly created Government Center, a position that would resemble the role of a chancellor.

== Arrest warrant ==
In 2020, the Supreme Tribunal of Justice of Venezuela ordered his arrest for allegedly participating in the 2018 Caracas drone attack against Nicolás Maduro. On 13 July 2020, the Attorney General's Office issued an arrest warrant for the alleged crimes of treason, usurpation of functions and association to commit crimes. On 16 January 2023, the attorney general appointed by the Constituent Assembly, Tarek William Saab, announced that the Public Ministry has requested a third arrest warrant against Borges, charged for participating in the 2019 uprising attempt of 30 April.

Political offices
Preceded by Henry Ramos Allup	President of the National Assembly of Venezuela; 2017–2018	Succeeded by Omar Barboza
