= United Socialist Party of Venezuela =

Socialist political party in Venezuela

United Socialist Party of Venezuela Partido Socialista Unido de Venezuela
- Eternal Leader: Hugo Chávez
- Acting President: Delcy Rodríguez
- Secretary-General: Diosdado Cabello
- Founder: Hugo Chávez
- Founded: 14 March 2007; 19 years ago
- Merger of: MVR, LS, MDD, PU, MIGATO
- Headquarters: Maripérez, Caracas
- Newspaper: Cuatro F
- Youth wing: JPSUV
- Paramilitary groups: Units of Battle Hugo Chávez; Colectivos (irregular forces)
- Membership (2024): ▲4,240,032
- Ideology: Chavismo; Bolivarianism; Socialism of the 21st century; Left-wing populism; Latin American integration
- Political position: Left-wing to far-left
- National affiliation: Great Patriotic Pole
- Regional affiliation: São Paulo Forum; Formerly: COPPPAL (expelled in 2025)
- International affiliation: World Anti-Imperialist Platform; For the Freedom of Nations!
- Colours: Red
- Slogan: Chávez vive, la lucha sigue (Chávez lives, the struggle continues)
- Anthem: "La Hora del Pueblo" (lit. 'People's Hour')
- National Assembly: 219 / 285
- Latin American Parliament: 4 / 12
- Governors: 22 / 23
- Mayors: 285 / 335

Party flag

Full party logo

Website
- www.psuv.org.ve

The United Socialist Party of Venezuela (Spanish: Partido Socialista Unido de Venezuela, PSUV [peˈsuβ, peˈsuβe]) is a socialist political party and the ruling party of Venezuela since 2007. It was formed from a merger of some of the political and social forces that support the Bolivarian Revolution begun by President Hugo Chávez.

At the 2015 Venezuelan parliamentary election, PSUV lost its majority in the National Assembly for the first time since the unicameral legislature's creation in 2000 against the Democratic Unity Roundtable, winning 55 out of the National Assembly's 167 seats. In the 2020 Venezuelan parliamentary election, amid a widespread opposition boycott, they won back a supermajority of the chamber.

== History ==
The process of merging most of the unidentified parties involved in the pro-Bolivarian Revolution coalition was initiated by Venezuelan president Hugo Chávez after he won the 2006 Venezuelan presidential election. The process was led by Chávez's own party, the Fifth Republic Movement, and was supported by a range of smaller parties such as the People's Electoral Movement (MEP), Venezuelan Popular Unity (UPV), the Tupamaro Movement, the Socialist League, and others, which all together added up 45.99% of the votes received by Chávez during the 2006 election. Other pro-Bolivarian parties like the Communist Party of Venezuela (Partido Comunista de Venezuela, PCV), Fatherland for All (Patria Para Todos, PPT), and For Social Democracy (PODEMOS), which cast 14.60% of the votes from that election, declined to join the new party.

On 7 March 2007, Chávez presented a phased plan for founding the new party until November 2007. PODEMOS, PPT, and PCV initially stated they would wait until PSUV had been founded and decide their membership in the new party based on its program. On 18 March 2007, Chávez declared on his programme Aló Presidente that he had opened the doors For Social Democracy, the Fatherland for All, and the Communist Party of Venezuela, and that if they want to leave the alliance, "they may do so and leave us in peace". In his opinion, those parties were near to be on the opposition, and they should choose wisely, between going "in silence, hugging us or throwing stones". At its 2007 congress on 10 and 11 April, PPT decided not to join but re-affirmed its support for Chávez and the Bolivarian Revolution.

| Parties joining PSUV | Parties not joining PSUV |
|---|---|
| Fifth Republic Movement (MVR) | For Social Democracy (PODEMOS) |
| People's Electoral Movement (MEP) | Fatherland for All (PPT) |
| Everybody Wins Independent Movement (MIGATO) | Communist Party of Venezuela (PCV) |
| Venezuelan Popular Unity (UPV) | Revolutionary Middle Class (CMR) |
| Revolutionary Movement Tupamaro (MRT) | Emergent People (GE) |
| Socialist League (LS) | Action Networks of Community Change (REDES) |
| Movement for Direct Democracy (MDD) | Communitary Patriotic Unity (UPC) |
| Union Party | New People Concentration Movement (MCGN) |
| Militant Civic Movement (MCM) | Active Democracy National Organization (ONDA) |
| Action Force of Base Coordination (FACOBA) | National Independent Movement (MNI) |
| Independents for the National Community (IPCN) | Labor Power (PL) |
| | Venezuelan Revolutionary Currents (CRV) |

The party held its founding congress in early 2008, from 12 January to 2 March, with 1681 delegates participating. Chávez was proclaimed President of the new party on 14 March. As of 2014, the party has been described as "fracturing" and "weakening" due to the loss of Hugo Chávez, the poor state of Venezuela's economy and falling oil prices. Internal issues also appeared in the party, with an email address and telephone hotline created to report "internal enemies". In the PSUV elections on 23 November 2014, it was reported by party dissidents that very few individuals participated, with less than 10% of the supposedly 7.6 million members casting a vote.

== Overview ==
The PSUV defines its values and principles as follows:

The party is constituted as a socialist party, and affirms that a socialist society is the only alternative to overcome the capitalist system. It assumes as ideological sources the thoughts and works of Simón Bolívar, Simón Rodríguez and Ezequiel Zamora. The party values in the same way the principles of scientific socialism, Christianity, liberation theology, all critical and humanist universal thought, gender equity and equality, and the ethical obligation to build a [political] model respectful of life and mother Earth that guarantees human survival.

As a multiethnic and diverse party, it nurtures its roots of Afro-Indianism bequeathed by Guaicaipuro and José Leonardo Chirino, all inspired by the fundamental leadership and revolutionary ideas of Commander Hugo Chávez, aimed at creating the new man and woman in a melting pot of hopes and dreams that make our socialism a mestizo socialism, loaded with Africanity, the elements of the indigenous peoples, and with the international vision that has had Francisco de Miranda as its greatest proponent.

We assume the principle of civic-military unity to guarantee the defense of national and popular sovereignty.

— Article 3: Values and Principles, PSUV Statutes, 2010

The PSUV defends the Bolivarian Revolution as a process of peaceful transition to socialism and, therefore, of overcoming capitalism. This is in line with Chávez's socialism of the 21st century. The party considers the establishment of socialism to be necessarily linked to an anti-imperialist struggle, that, currently, must consist of the formation of a block of socialist countries in Latin America. With the creation of PSUV, relationships greatly soured with former coalition parties that chose not to join. By the 2008 regional election campaign in October, Chávez declared that Patria Para Todos and the Communist Party of Venezuela "must be swept from the Venezuelan political map because they are disloyal, liars, and manipulators".

Chávez said that the PSUV was "a very young party" with an average age of 35 among members. Analysts agreed, saying: "The assumption is that the younger people are going to be [Chavistas], they are going to be the ones whose families have benefited from Chávez's social programs." In April 2010, an Extraordinary Congress of the PSUV resulted in the endorsement of a range of "general principles", including among others socialism, Marxism, and Bolivarianism; humanism, internationalism, and patriotism; and the defense of participatory democracy and use of internal party democracy. It also defined the party as the "political vanguard of the revolutionary process". The party held its 3rd Congress in 2014, which elected Nicolás Maduro as the 2nd party president and honored Hugo Chávez posthumously as the party's eternal president and founder, and party policies were updated. It was followed by the 4th Party Congress in 2018.

== Symbolism ==
The Party builds on the cult of personality of Hugo Chávez, with revolutionary symbols like the Chávez eyes sometimes along with the party symbols.

=== Party symbols ===
Official logo,
2007–2024

Official logo,
2024–present

Electoral logo,
2010 election

Variation of the official logo featuring Hugo Chávez's eyes

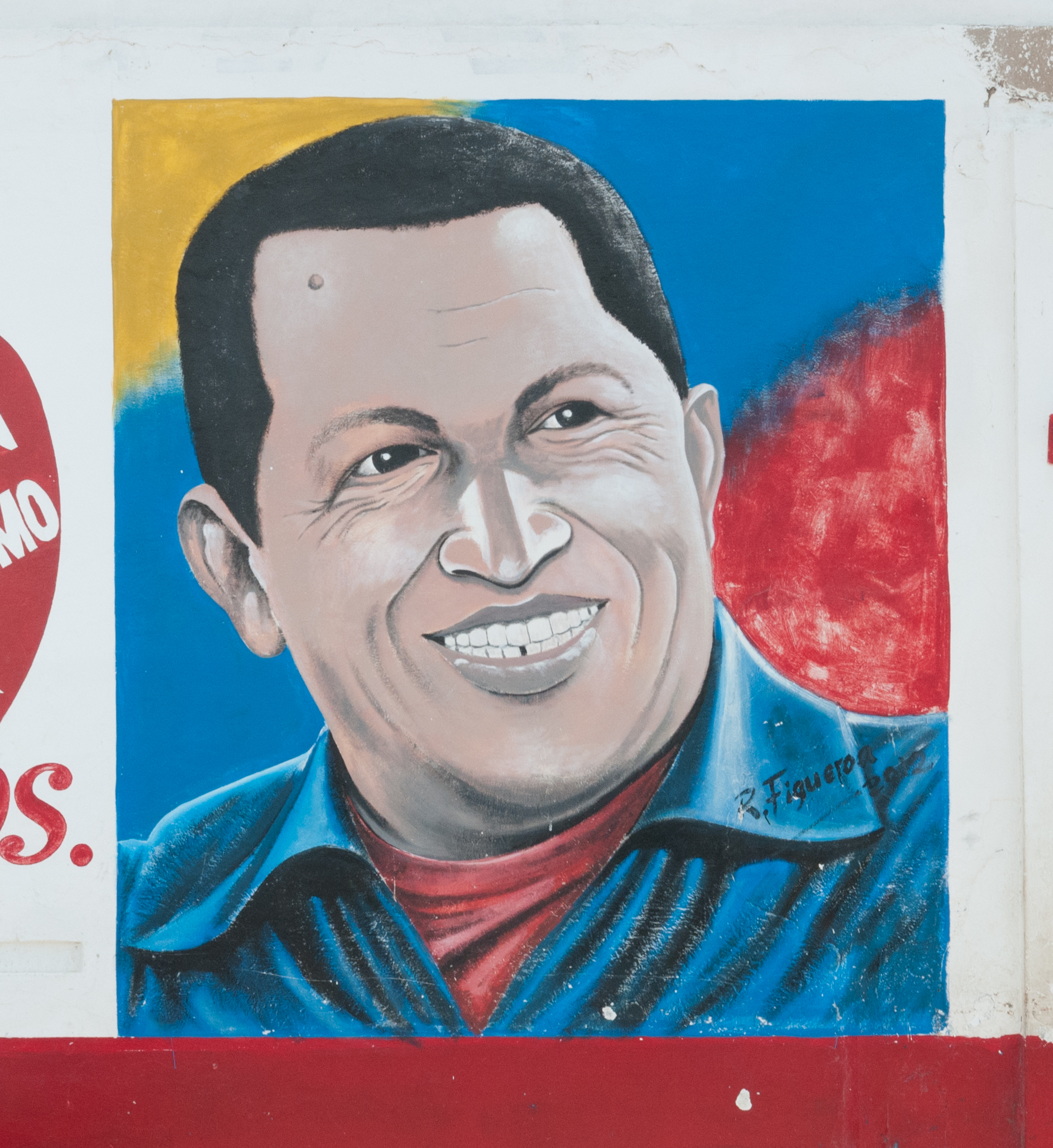
Street painting of Hugo Chávez in Punta de Piedras

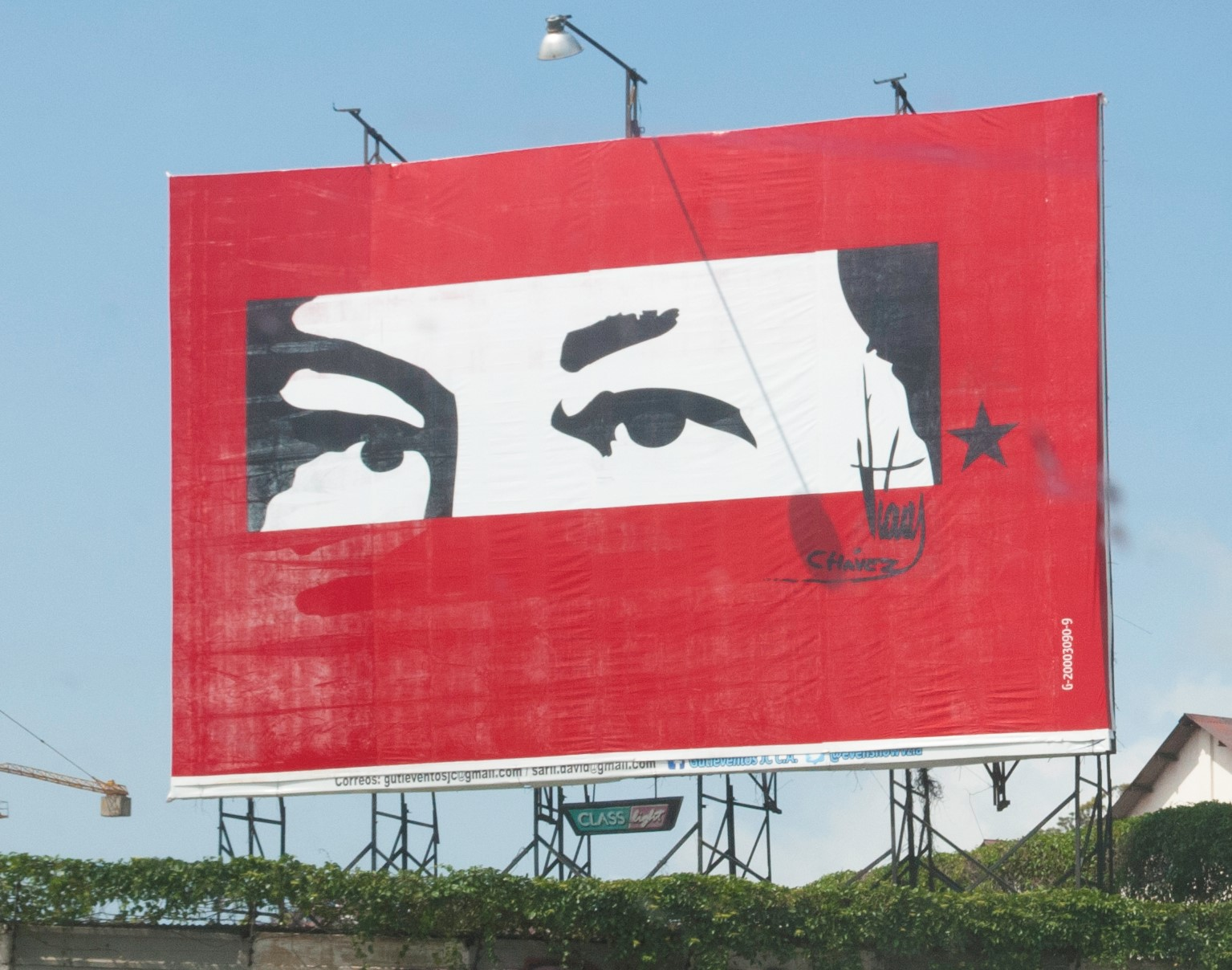
A billboard with Hugo Chávez's eyes and signature in Guarenas

== Structure ==
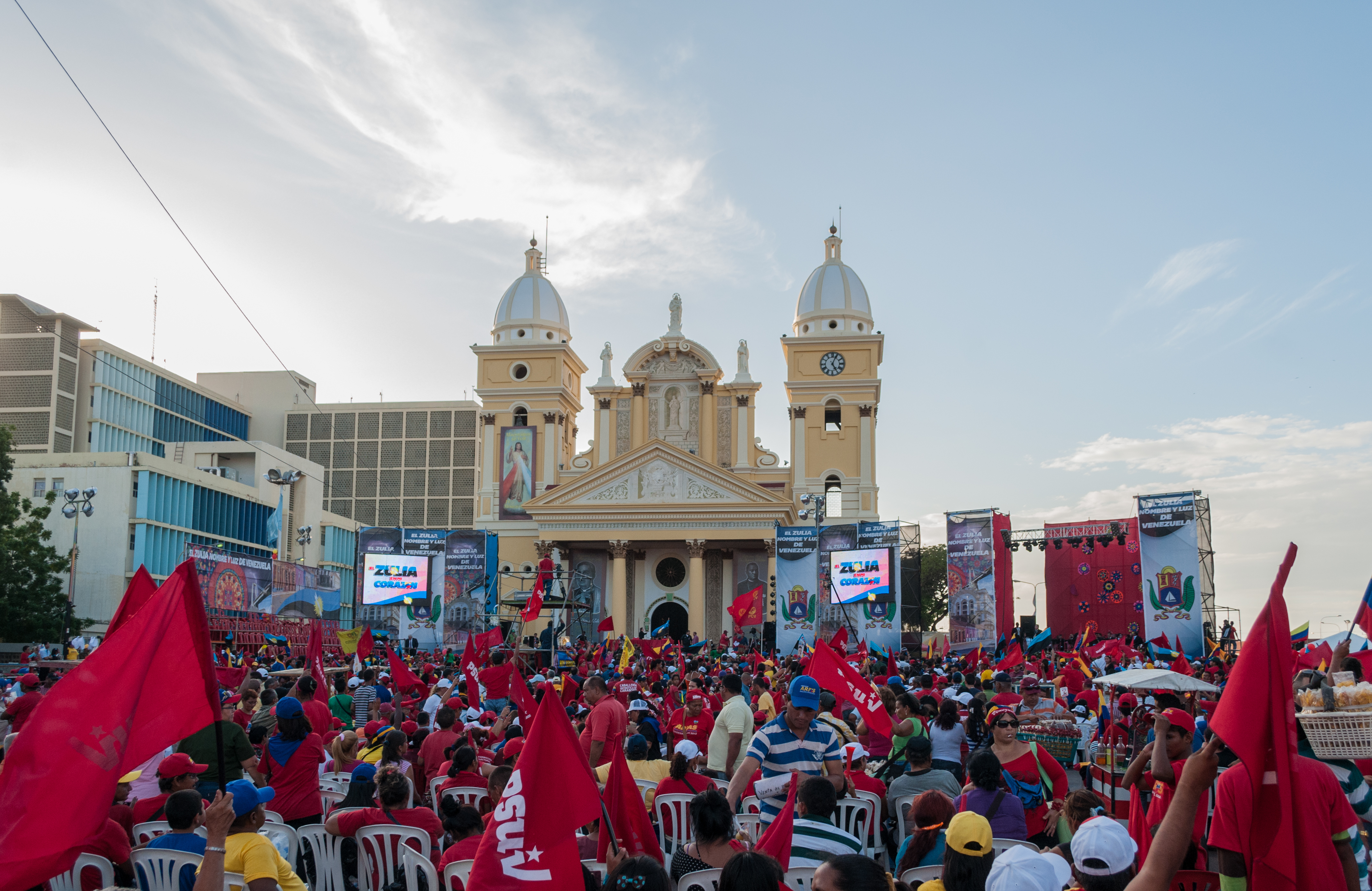
Party meeting in Maracaibo in December 2012

=== Party Congress ===
The highest level of organization is the National Party Congress, which is the party's supreme organ, and is held upon the discretion of the National Board whenever necessary. It is composed of elected delegates both from the national level and state representatives of party committees, and is empowered to:

- nominate the President of the Party and his/her Secretary-General
- elect new or returning members of the National Board, National Political Bureau, and departments of the National Board
- amend the Party Charter and Rules
- discuss and enact any new party policies, as well as to amend existing ones

The National Party Congress is held every four years.

=== National Board ===
The party is headed at the national level by the Eternal Leader Hugo Chávez (a posthumous title), the president (currently Nicolás Maduro), secretary-general (Diosdado Cabello), and the national board of directors currently made up of the following:

- Adán Chávez
- Alí Rodríguez Araque
- Ana Elisa Osorio
- Aristóbulo Istúriz
- Darío Vivas
- Cilia Flores
- Elías Jaua
- Erika Farías
- Freddy Bernal
- Héctor Rodríguez
- Jacqueline Faría
- Jorge Rodríguez
- Luis Reyes Reyes
- María Cristina Iglesias
- María León
- Mario Silva
- Nicolás Maduro
- Noelí Pocaterra
- Rafael Ramírez
- Rafael Gil Barrios
- Ramón Rodríguez Chacín
- Rodrigo Cabezas
- Tareck El Aissami
- Vanessa Davies
- Yelitze Santaella

The PSUV National Board is the highest organ of party leadership and is empowered by the Charter to enact new policies in between Party Congresses.

=== Units of Battle Hugo Chávez (UBCh) ===
The Units of Battle Hugo Chávez (UBCh) is a collection of organizations with multiple members of PSUV involved that has both military and political characteristics. The UBCh originated as a group to defend the Bolivarian Revolution and support the party through electoral processes in Venezuela, and were transformed into their current name in 2013. They form the basic party unit in Venezuelan communities, and four or more of them form a People's Struggle Circle (Círculo de Lucha Popular) at the community level. The Unit itself is divided into ten Unit Patrols serving various functions for party members in various sectors. Other assisting groups include:

- PSUV National Political Bureau
- PSUV Regional Departments, led by Regional Vice Presidents
- PSUV Sectors Organizations, led by Sectoral Vice Presidents
- United Socialist Party of Venezuela Youth

== Election results ==
=== Presidential ===
| Election year | Name | No. of overall votes | % of overall vote |
|---|---|---|---|
| 2012 | Hugo Chávez | 8,191,132 | 55.1 (1st) |
| 2012 | Major party in the "Great Patriotic Pole". | | |
| 2013 | Nicolás Maduro | 7,587,579 | 50.6 (1st) |
| 2013 | Major party in the "Great Patriotic Pole". | | |
| 2018 (disputed) | Nicolás Maduro | 6,205,875 | 67.8 (1st) |
| 2018 (disputed) | Major party in the "Great Patriotic Pole". | | |
| 2024 (disputed) | Nicolás Maduro | 6,408,844 | 51.95 (1st under CNE) |
| 2024 (disputed) | Major party in the "Great Patriotic Pole". | | |

=== Parliamentary ===
| Election year | No. of overall votes | % of overall vote | No. of overall seats won | +/– | Leader |
|---|---|---|---|---|---|
| 2010 | 5,451,419 (1st) | 48.3 | 96 / 165 | ▼22 | Diosdado Cabello |
| 2015 | 5,599,025 (2nd) | 40.9 | 52 / 167 | ▼44 | Diosdado Cabello |
| 2020 | 6,780,121 (1st) | 61.7 | 222 / 277 | ▲170 | Jorge Rodríguez |
| 2025 | 5,024,475 (1st) | 83.5 | 219 / 285 | ▼3 | Jorge Rodríguez |
