= IV National Assembly of Venezuela =

Legislature of Venezuela, 2016–2021

←	III	V	→

Overview
- Legislative body: National Assembly
- Jurisdiction: Venezuela
- Term: 5 January 2016 – 5 January 2021
- Election: 2015 Venezuelan parliamentary election
- Members: 167
- President: Henry Ramos Allup (AD); Julio Borges (PJ); Omar Barboza (UNT); Juan Guaidó (Independent); Dinorah Figuera (PJ)
- Party control: Democratic Unity Roundtable

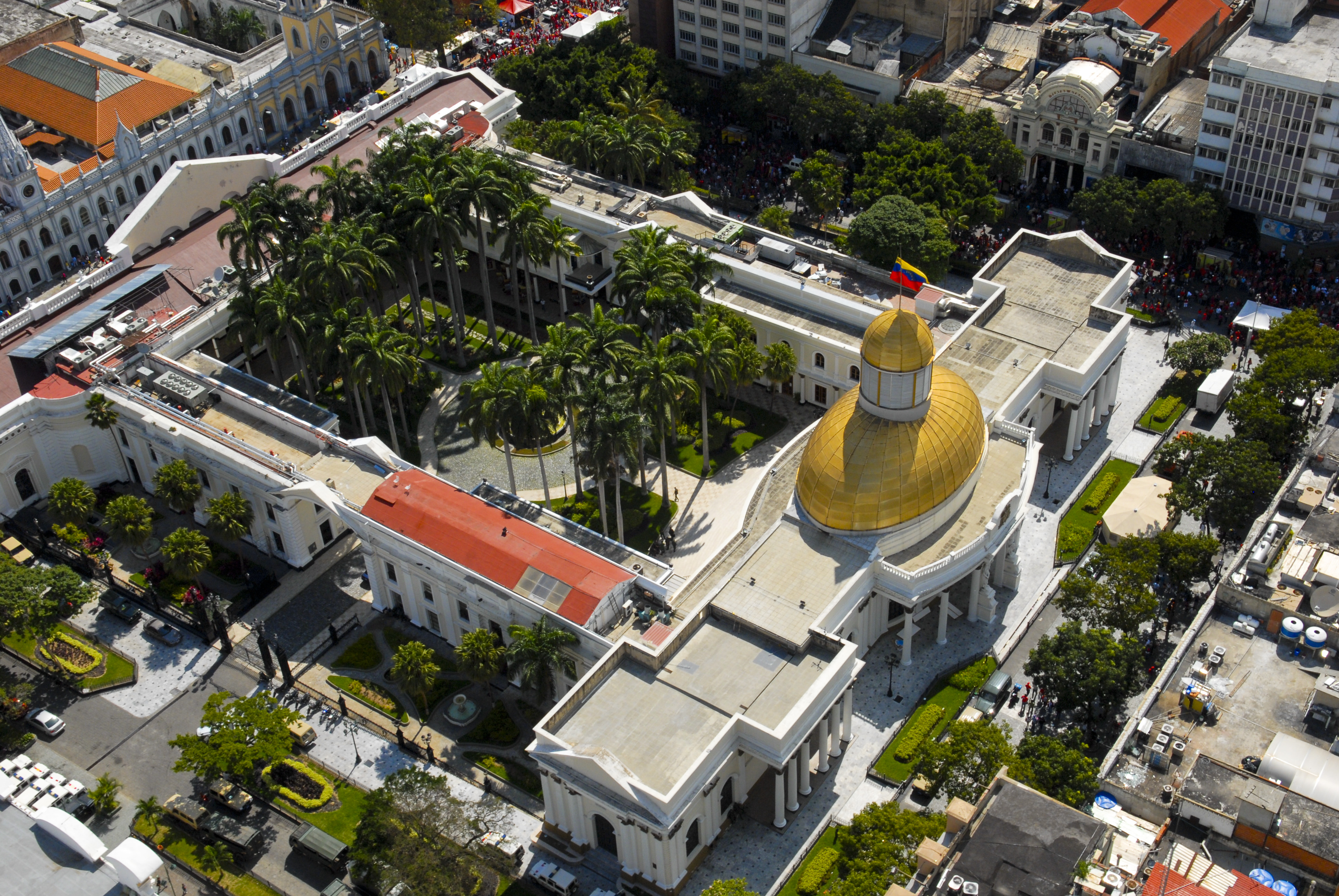
Palacio Federal Legislativo

The IV National Assembly of Venezuela was the fourth legislative term of the National Assembly of Venezuela, elected in the 2015 parliamentary election. It was installed on 5 January 2016 after the opposition coalition Democratic Unity Roundtable (MUD) won a two-thirds supermajority with a 74% turnout, marking the first defeat of the governing United Socialist Party of Venezuela (PSUV) in a national election since it came to power.

The National Assembly's constitutional five-year term expired on 5 January 2021. However, its members continued to operate through the Delegated Commission, arguing that the 2020 and 2025 parliamentary elections lacked democratic guarantees and therefore did not produce a legitimate successor legislature. Since then, the National Assembly has maintained its own leadership and repeatedly extended its claim of constitutional continuity.

== Current status (2021–present) ==
On 26 December 2020, shortly before the expiration of its constitutional term, the National Assembly approved an agreement declaring the "constitutional and administrative continuity" of the legislature beyond 5 January 2021. The measure was justified by the Assembly on the grounds that the 2020 parliamentary election had not met constitutional or democratic standards and therefore had not produced a legitimate successor legislature. As a result, the Assembly resolved to continue exercising certain constitutional functions through its Delegated Commission.

Following the beginning of the V Legislature on 5 January 2021, the 2015 Assembly ceased to meet in ordinary plenary sessions and instead operated through the Delegated Commission, a smaller body provided for under the 1999 Constitution to act on behalf of the Assembly during parliamentary recesses. Several deputies declined to participate in the continuity arrangement, either because they supported the 2020 parliamentary election or due to concerns over possible reprisals, leaving the Delegated Commission with only a fraction of the legislators originally elected in 2015.

The legal validity of the National Assembly's continued operation became a matter of political and constitutional dispute. Supporters argued that the continuation preserved the institutional legitimacy of the legislature until free and fair parliamentary elections could be held, while the government of Nicolás Maduro rejected the claim and recognized only the Assembly elected in 2020. The practical scope of the 2015 Assembly's actions gradually diminished after 2021 as it lost control of the legislative palace and most domestic state institutions.

The continuity arrangement also provided the legal basis for the continuation of the opposition's interim government headed by Juan Guaidó, whose claim to the interim presidency was based on his position as President of the National Assembly. In December 2022, however, the four largest opposition parties represented in the Assembly (Justice First, Democratic Action, Un Nuevo Tiempo, and Movement for Venezuela) proposed abolishing the interim government, arguing that it had failed to achieve its objectives and citing legal, political, and ethical concerns, including allegations of corruption. Guaidó opposed the proposal, describing it as unconstitutional and warning that it would strengthen the government of Nicolás Maduro. During a virtual meeting held on 30 December 2022, the Assembly approved the reform to the Transition Statute by a vote of 72 to 29, with eight abstentions, formally dissolving the interim government while maintaining the Delegated Commission of the 2015 legislature to oversee certain foreign assets and continue its claim of institutional continuity.

Following the dissolution of the interim government, the Assembly elected a new leadership for the 2023–2024 legislative session. On the proposal of the Democratic Action parliamentary group, deputy Dinorah Figuera (PJ) was elected President of the National Assembly and was sworn in during a virtual meeting on 5 January 2023. Marianela Fernández (UNT) and Auristela Vásquez (AD) were elected first and second vice presidents, respectively. On 5 January 2024, they were re-elected to continue leading the Delegated Commission. Earlier, in December 2023, the Assembly had approved a reform to the Statute Governing the Transition to Democracy extending its claim of constitutional continuity for an additional twelve months, arguing that the measure would remain in force until free and transparent parliamentary elections could be held.

Following the disputed 2024 presidential election, it was announced on 14 December 2024 that the Assembly had approved a further extension of its claim of constitutional continuity until 6 January 2026, intended to allow the 2015 Assembly to swear in opposition candidate Edmundo González as President of Venezuela in 2025 amid the ensuing political crisis. However, González, who had gone into exile in Spain, was unable to return to Venezuela, and the inauguration did not take place.

On 18 June 2026, Assembly president Dinorah Figuera returned to Venezuela for the first time since leaving the country for exile in Spain in 2018. During her visit, she met at the Federal Legislative Palace with Jorge Rodríguez, to address issues such as the appointment of a new National Electoral Council. Figuera also met with U.S. chargé d'affaires John Barrett, Assistant Secretary of State for Western Hemisphere Affairs Michael Kozak, and representatives of the Unitary Platform. She stated that she had accepted the invitation of the U.S. State Department "in her capacity as president of the 2015 National Assembly, an institution that the United States continues to recognize."

== Major events ==
- 2017 Venezuelan protests (2012 – present)
  - 2017 Venezuelan constitutional crisis (29 March 2017)
  - 2017 Venezuelan National Assembly attack (5 July 2017)
  - 2017 Venezuelan referendum (16 July 2017)
  - 2017 Venezuelan Constituent Assembly election (30 July 2017)
- Arrest and detention of Juan Requesens (7 August 2018)
- Venezuelan presidential crisis (10 January 2019 – 5 January 2023)
- Statute Governing the Transition to Democracy (5 February 2019)
- 2019 Venezuelan Amnesty Law
- Operación Alacrán (1 December 2019 – 5 January 2020)
- Venezuelan National Assembly Delegated Committee election (5 January 2020)

== Leadership ==
No.	Portrait	Name	Term of Office		State	Legislature	Party
7		Henry Ramos Allup	5 January 2016	5 January 2017	Capital District	4th	Democratic Action (MUD)
8		Julio Borges	5 January 2017	5 January 2018	Miranda	4th	Justice First (MUD)
9		Omar Barboza	5 January 2018	5 January 2019	Zulia	4th	A New Era(MUD)
10		Juan Guaidó	5 January 2019	5 January 2023	Vargas	4th	Independent (MUD)
11		Dinorah Figuera	5 January 2023	present	Aragua	4th	Justice First (MUD)

== Parties ==
Map of Venezuela. Blue denotes districts won by the MUD and allies, Red denotes those won by the PSUV and allies.

Democratic Unity Roundtable (64) PJ (30) UNT (15) VP (14) MPV (es) (1) COPEI (1) PRVZL (1) CC (es) (1) EC (es) (1) Great Patriotic Pole (50) PSUV (31) PCV (6) PPT (4) MRT (3) PODEMOS (2) VBR (2) UPV (1) APC (1) Agreement for Change (8) CMC (es) (8) AP (3) I Am Venezuela (es) (4) ABP (1) CN (1) VV (1) Independents (2) Socialist Block (1) FB (1) Other Opposition (33) AD (25) LCR (4) PC (es) (2) Independents (2) Vacant (6) Vacant (6)

Name	Code	Members	Alternate
Democratic Action (Venezuela)	AD	25	15
Justice First	PJ	18	19
A New Era	UNT	17	16
Popular Will	VP	15	14
Fuerza Liberal	FL	0	1
Nueva Visión para mi País	NUVIPA	0	1
Partido Cristiano Nosotros Organizados Elegimos	UNIDAD NOE	0	1
Movimiento Alternativo Buscando Soluciones	MABS	0	1
Independents	Ind. (MUD)	3	3
Mesa de la Unidad Democrática (Opposition)	MUD / UNIDAD	78	71
Encuentro Ciudadano	EC	1	0
Project Venezuela	PROVE	2	0
Movimiento Progresista de Venezuela	MPV	1	0
Cuentas Claras	CC	0	1
Concertación por Venezuela (Opposition)	CxV	4	1
Vente Venezuela	VV	1	3
Fearless People's Alliance	ABP	1	3
National Convergence	Conv.	1	0
Independent	Ind. (SV)	1	0
Soy Venezuela (Opposition)	SV / Fracción 16-J	4	5
Cambiemos Movimiento Ciudadano	CMC	2	1
Progressive Advance	AP	1	1
Soluciones para Venezuela	SPV	0	1
Agreement for Change (Opposition)	CPC	3	3
La Causa Radical	LCR	2	2
Sin coalición: La Causa Radical (Opposition)	LCR	2	2
Independents (Operación Alacrán)	Ind. / IRC	18	2
United Socialist Party of Venezuela	PSUV	43	19
Tupamaro	TUPAMARO	4	1
Communist Party of Venezuela	PCV	2	4
Vanguardia Bicentenaria Republicana	VBR	0	2
Fatherland for All	PPT	0	3
Unidad Popular Venezolana	UPV	0	1
Great Patriotic Pole (Chavismo)	GPP	49	27
Frente Bolivariano Alternativo	FBA	1	0
Redes de Respuesta de Cambios Comunitarios	REDES	0	3
Chavismo dissent	-	1	3
Disincorporated		1	1
No representatives		7	54
TOTAL		167	167

== Color codes ==
Democratic Unity Roundtable/Opposition
Great Patriotic Pole/Officialism

== Members ==
Note: (E) = Deputy substitute

=== Opposition ===
The Venezuelan system is presidential, so although the PSUV has a minority in the Assembly, they remain the government.

N.º	Representative	State	Coalition	Party	Alternate Representative	Party
1	Nirma Guarulla	Amazonas	MUD	UNT	Maulgimer Baloa	UNT
2	Julio Haron Ygarza	Amazonas	MUD	UNT	Rosa Petit	UNT
3	Luis Carlos Padilla	Anzoátegui	(allied with MUD)	AD	Eudoro González	PJ
4	Héctor Cordero (acting)	Anzoátegui	(allied with MUD)	AD	Vacant	
5	José Brito	Anzoátegui	-	Ind. / IRC	Marco Aurelio Quiñones	VP
6	Chaim Bucarán	Anzoátegui	MUD	UNT (Suspended)	Tatiana Montiel	PJ
7	Carlos Michelangeli	Anzoátegui	MUD	PJ	Yajaira Castro de Forero	PJ
8	Richard Arteaga	Anzoátegui	-	Ind. / IRC	Oneida Guaipe	AD
9	Armando Armas Cuartín	Anzoátegui	MUD	VP	Omar González	VV
10	Luis Lippa	Apure	MUD	PJ	Julio Montoya	PJ
11	Gilberto Sojo (acting)	Aragua	MUD	VP	María Verónica Rengifo	VP
12	Guillermo Luces (acting)	Aragua	-	Ind. / IRC	Vacant	
13	José Trujillo	Aragua	(allied with MUD)	AD	Adriana Pichardo	VP
14	Amelia Belisario	Aragua	MUD	PJ	José Gregorio Hernández	AD
15	Melva Paredes	Aragua	CPC	CMC	Luis Barragán	VV
16	Karin Salanova	Aragua	MUD	VP	Freddy Castellanos	UNT
17	Simón Calzadilla	Aragua	CxV / MUD	MPV	Liz Carolina Jaramillo	PJ
18	Arnoldo Benítez (acting)	Aragua	-	LCR	Vacant	
19	Julio César Reyes	Barinas	(allied with MUD)	Ind.	Pablo Moronta	PJ
20	Lincoln Pérez (acting)	Barinas	(allied with MUD)	AD	Vacant	
21	Adolfo Superlano	Barinas	-	Ind. / IRC	Sandra Flores de Garzón	PJ
22	Maribel Guédez	Barinas	CPC	CMC	Alejandra Peña	PJ
23	Andrés Eloy Camejo	Barinas	(allied with MUD)	AD	César Cadenas	UNT
24	Ángel Medina Devis	Bolívar	MUD	PJ	Rachid Yasbek	PJ
25	Luis Silva	Bolívar	(allied with MUD)	AD	Antonio Geara	VP
26	Olivia Lozano	Bolívar	MUD	VP	Ángel Álvarez Medina	LCR
27	Francisco Sucre	Bolívar	MUD	VP	Ligia Delfín	VP
28	José Prat	Bolívar	-	LCR	José Hernández	UNT
29	Freddy Valera	Bolívar	(allied with MUD)	AD	José Salazar	UNT
30	Manuel González (acting)	Bolívar	-	Ind. / IRC	Vacant	
31	Carlos Berrizbeitia	Carabobo	CxV / MUD	PROVE	Noe Mujica	UNIDAD NOE
32	Deyalitza Aray (acting)	Carabobo	CxV / MUD	PROVE	Vacant	
33	Ylidio de Abreu	Carabobo	MUD	UNT	Yolanda Tortolero	UNT
34	Williams Gil	Carabobo	-	Ind. / IRC	Armando López	UNT
35	Ángel Álvarez Gil	Carabobo	MUD	VP	María Concepción Mulino	CC
36	Marco Bozo	Carabobo	MUD	PJ	Daniel Arias	PJ
37	Romny Flores	Carabobo	(allied with MUD)	AD	Antonio Román	AD
38	Leandro Domínguez (acting)	Carabobo	-	Ind. / IRC	Vacant	
39	Dennis Fernández	Cojedes	(allied with MUD)	AD	José Gregorio Correa	PJ
40	José Antonio España	Delta Amacuro	-	Ind. / IRC	Larissa González	AD
41	Gregorio Graterol	Falcón	MUD	PJ	Mabelly de León Ponte	AD
42	Kerrins Mavárez (acting)	Falcón	-	Ind. / IRC	Vacant	
43	Eliezer Sirit	Falcón	(allied with MUD)	AD	Julio César Moreno	PJ
44	Juan García Manaure	Falcón	MUD	PJ	Ricardo Aponte	VP
45	Carlos Prosperi	Guárico	(allied with MUD)	AD	Bibiana Lucas	PJ
46	Edgar Zambrano	Lara	(allied with MUD)	AD	Guillermo Palacios	UNT
47	María Teresa Pérez	Lara	CPC	AP	Oneiber Peraza	AP
48	Bolivia Suárez	Lara	MUD	VP	Daniel Antequera	LCR
49	Ángel Torres (acting)	Lara	MUD	VP	Vacant	
50	Alfonso Marquina	Lara	MUD	PJ	Juan Vilera Del Corral	VP
51	Teodoro Campos	Lara	(allied with MUD)	Ind.	Macario González	VP
52	Luis Loaiza Rincón (E)	Mérida	-	Ind. / IRC	Kiko Bautista	Ind.
53	Alexis Paparoni	Mérida	MUD	UNT	Mary Morales	AD
54	Mildred Carrero (acting)	Mérida	MUD	VP	Vacant	
55	William Davila	Mérida	(allied with MUD)	AD	Lawrence Castro	VP
56	Carmen Sivoli (acting)	Mérida	(allied with MUD)	AD	Vacant	
57	Manuela Bolívar (acting)	Miranda	MUD	VP	Vacant	
58	Luis Aquiles Moreno	Miranda	(allied with MUD)	AD	Omar Avila	UVV (Ind. / IRC)
59	Delsa Solórzano	Miranda	CxV / MUD	EC	Jesús Yánez	AD
60	Ángel Alvarado (E)	Miranda	MUD	PJ	Vacant	
61	Manuel Texeira (acting)	Miranda	MUD	UNT	Vacant	
62	Arkiely Perfecto (acting)	Miranda	-	Ind. / IRC	Vacant	
63	José Gregorio Aparicio	Monagas	-	Ind. / IRC	Dignora Hernández	VV
64	Pierre Maroun	Monagas	(allied with MUD)	AD	José Antonio Mendoza	PJ
65	María Gabriela Hernández	Monagas	MUD	PJ	Aquiles Arvelo	MABS
66	Carlos Bastardo (E)	Monagas	SV	VV	Vacant	
67	Tobias Bolívar	Nueva Esparta	(allied with MUD)	AD	Oscar Ronderos	AD
68	Luis Emilio Rondón	Nueva Esparta	MUD	UNT	Yanet Fermín	VP
69	Orlando Ávila	Nueva Esparta	MUD	UNT	Magalvi Estaba	AD
70	Antonio Aranguren (E)	Nueva Esparta	MUD	PJ	Vacant	
71	María Beatriz Martínez	Portuguesa	MUD	PJ	Wilfredo Galíndez	AD
72	Robert Alcala	Sucre	(allied with MUD)	AD	Denncis Pazos	UNT
73	José Gregorio Noriega	Sucre	-	Ind. / IRC	Leonardo Regnault	PJ
74	Milagros Paz	Sucre	MUD	PJ	Juan Carlos Bolívar	ABP
75	Ezequiel Pérez	Táchira	(allied with MUD)	AD	Eduardo Marin	PJ
76	Carlos Valero (acting)	Táchira	MUD	UNT	Vacant	
77	Franklyn Duarte (acting)	Táchira	-	Ind. / IRC	Vacant	
78	Renzo Prieto (acting)	Táchira	MUD	VP	Vacant	
79	Karim Vera (acting)	Táchira	MUD	PJ	Vacant	
80	Carlos González	Trujillo	(allied with MUD)	AD	Emilio Fajardo	PJ
81	Conrado Pérez	Trujillo	-	Ind. / IRC	Joaquín Aguilar	UNT
82	Ana Mercedes Aponte (acting)	Vargas	(allied with MUD)	AD	Belkis Ulacio	FL
83	Milagros Eulate	Vargas	(allied with MUD)	AD	Vacant	
84	Juan Guaidó	Vargas	MUD	Ind.	César Alonso	UNT
85	Biagio Pilieri	Yaracuy	SV	Conv.	Jesús Gabriel Peña Navas	SPV / IRC
86	Luis Parra Rivero	Yaracuy	-	Ind. / IRC	Ramón Flores	Ind.
87	Enrique Márquez	Zulia	MUD	UNT	Marianela Fernández	UNT
88	Edwin Luzardo (acting)	Zulia	SV	ABP	Vacant	
89	Omar Barboza	Zulia	MUD	UNT	Liz María Márquez	AD
90	Avilio Troconiz	Zulia	MUD	PJ	Daniela Parra	AD
91	Elimar Díaz	Zulia	MUD	PJ	Jairo Bao	UNT
92	Nora Bracho	Zulia	MUD	UNT	Desiree Barboza	VP
93	Elías Matta	Zulia	MUD	UNT	Rafael Ramírez Colina	PJ
94	Juan Pablo Guanipa	Zulia	MUD	PJ	José Sánchez Montiel "Mazuco"	Ind.
95	William Barrientos	Zulia	MUD	UNT (Suspended)	Vacant	
96	José Luis Pirela	Zulia	SV	Ind.	Mary Álvarez León	CMC
97	Héctor Vargas (acting)	Zulia	MUD	UNT (Suspended)	Vacant	
98	Juan Carlos Velazco	Zulia	(allied with MUD)	AD	Ángel Caridad	UNT
99	Freddy Paz	Zulia	-	Ind. / IRC	Gilmar Márquez	VP
100	Tamara Adrián (E)	Distrito Capital	MUD	VP	Evelyn Martínez	Ind.
101	Jesús Abreu	Distrito Capital	MUD	VP	Nafir Morales	ABP
102	Marialbert Barrios	Distrito Capital	MUD	PJ	Fátima Suárez	UNT
103	Henry Ramos Allup	Distrito Capital	(allied with MUD)	AD	Vacant	
104	Rafael Veloz (acting)	Distrito Capital	MUD	VP	Vacant	
105	Stalin González	Distrito Capital	MUD	UNT	Ivlev Silva	AD
106	Lucila Pacheco (acting)	Zulia	-	Ind. / IRC	Vacant	
107	Virgilio Ferrer	Indigenous peoples Región Occidente	MUD	UNT/MiaZulia	Ricardo Fernández	AD/Parlinve
108	Gladys Guaipo	Indigenous peoples Región Oriente	(allied with MUD)	AD/Parlinve	Yulibert Guacarán	VP/Parlinve
109	Romel Guzamana	Indigenous peoples Región Sur	MUD	VP/Coiba	Javier Linares	PJ/Tawala
1	Vacant	Distrito Capital	-	-	Vacant	
2	Vacant	Miranda	-	-	Vacant	
3	Vacant	Miranda	-	-	Vacant	
4	Vacant	Táchira	-	-	Vacant	
5	Vacant	Distrito Capital	-	-	Vacant	

=== Oficialism ===
N.º	Representative	State	Coalition	Party	Alternate Representative	Party
1	Earle Herrera	Anzoátegui	GPPSB	PSUV	Ángel Rodríguez	PSUV
2	Cristóbal Jiménez	Apure	GPPSB	PSUV	Enma Díaz de Solórzano	PSUV
3	Domingo Santana	Apure	GPPSB	PSUV	Jesmar Bona	PSUV
4	Dairene Delgado (acting)	Apure	GPPSB	PSUV	Vacant	
5	Héctor Orlando Zambrano	Apure	GPPSB	PSUV	Mayrut Castillo	PSUV
6	Ricardo Molina	Aragua	GPPSB	PSUV	Eglé de los Santos Sánchez	PSUV
7	Naybeth Berrios (acting)	Barinas	GPPSB	PSUV	Lida Silva Larrarte	PSUV
8	Victoria Mata (acting)	Bolívar	GPPSB	PSUV	Raiza Lanz	Tupamaro
9	Saúl Ortega	Carabobo	GPPSB	PSUV	Yonder Silva	PSUV
10	Héctor Agüero	Carabobo	GPPSB	PSUV	Edith Francisco	PSUV
11	Cilia Flores	Cojedes	GPPSB	PSUV	Asdrúbal Salazar	PSUV
12	Xavier Vega (acting)	Cojedes	GPPSB	Tupamaro	Vacant	
13	Nosliw Rodríguez	Cojedes	GPPSB	PSUV	Edgar Lucena	PCV
14	Pedro Carreño	Delta Amacuro	GPPSB	PSUV	Juan Arroyo	UPV
15	Carlos Gómez	Delta Amacuro	GPPSB	PSUV	Ángel Raúl Parica	Redes
16	Pedro Santaella (acting)	Delta Amacuro	GPPSB	PSUV	Vacant	
17	Sol Musset (acting)	Falcón	GPPSB	PSUV	Sandra D'Amelio	VBR
18	Jesús Montilla	Falcón	GPPSB	PSUV	Eduardo Linarez	PCV
19	Oscar Figuera	Guárico	GPPSB	PCV	Carola Martínez	PSUV
20	Christopher Constant	Guárico	GPPSB	PSUV	Raiza Carrillo	PPT
21	Juan Marín	Guárico	GPPSB	PSUV	Ramón Magallanes	PSUV
22	Frang Morales (acting)	Guárico	GPPSB	PSUV	Vacant	
23	Willian Gil	Lara	GPPSB	PSUV	Ana Salas	VBR
24	Julio Chávez	Lara	GPPSB	PSUV	Yamilet Camacaro	PSUV
25	César Carrero (acting)	Mérida	GPPSB	PSUV	Vacant	
26	Haiman El Troudi	Miranda	GPPSB	PSUV	Erika Ortega	PSUV
27	Jaime Rengifo	Miranda	GPPSB	Tupamaro	Vacant	
28	Elio Serrano	Miranda	GPPSB	PSUV	Oriana Osio	PSUV
29	Diosdado Cabello	Monagas	GPPSB	PSUV	Euribes Guevara Goycochea	PSUV
30	Williams Benavides (acting)	Monagas	GPPSB	Tupamaro	Vacant	
31	Dinorah Villasmil	Nueva Esparta	GPPSB	PSUV	Febres Rodríguez	PCV
32	Rubén Becerra (acting)	Portuguesa	GPPSB	PSUV	Zandra Castillo Pérez	NUVIPA
33	Mariana Lerin	Portuguesa	GPPSB	PSUV	María Mercedes Torrealba	Redes
34	Amílcar Sanoja (acting)	Portuguesa	GPPSB	Tupamaro		
35	William Pérez	Portuguesa	GPPSB	PSUV	Elsy Alvarado	PSUV
36	Francisco Torrealba	Portuguesa	GPPSB	PSUV	Pedro Eusse	PCV
37	Gilberto Pinto	Sucre	GPPSB	PSUV	Carlos Martinez	PSUV
38	Erick Mago Rodríguez (acting)	Sucre	GPPSB	PSUV	Vacant	
39	Rafael Rodríguez	Sucre	GPPSB	PSUV	Marcos Padovani	Redes
40	César Macario Sandoval (acting)	Táchira	GPPSB	PSUV	Vacant	
41	Hugbel Roa	Trujillo	GPPSB	PSUV	Gerardo Márquez	PSUV
42	Loengri Matheus	Trujillo	GPPSB	PSUV	Lisbeidy Quintero	PSUV
43	Yolmar Gudiño	Trujillo	GPPSB	PSUV	Vacant	
44	Durga Ochoa (acting)	Vargas	GPPSB	PSUV	Vacant	
45	Yul Jabour	Yaracuy	GPPSB	PCV	Braulio Álvarez	PSUV
46	Carmen Moreno (acting)	Yaracuy	GPPSB	PSUV	Vacant	
47	Haydee Huérfano	Yaracuy	GPPSB	PSUV	Robert González	PPT
48	Sergio Fuenmayor	Zulia	GPPSB	PSUV	Yosmary Fernández	PSUV
49	Tania Díaz	Distrito Capital	GPPSB	PSUV	Ilenia Medina	PPT
1	Nicia Maldonado (acting)	Amazonas	GPPSB	PSUV	Luis Vílchez	PSUV
2	Vacant	Lara	-	-	Vacant	
3	Vacant	Miranda	-		Vacant	

=== Dissent ===
N.º	Principal deputy (or person in charge)	State	Coalition	Party	Alternate Representative	Party
1	Eustoquio Contreras	Guárico	-	FBA	Yosneisy Paredes	PSUV

=== Representatives per state, 2016–2021 ===
Federal Entity		Representatives	Map
	Amazonas	3	
	Anzoátegui	8	
	Apure	5	
	Aragua	9	
	Barinas	6	
	Bolívar	8	
	Carabobo	10	
	Cojedes	4	
	Delta Amacuro	4	
	Dependencias Federales	-	
	Distrito Capital	9	
	Falcón	6	
	Guárico	6	
	Lara	10	
	Mérida	6	
	Miranda	12	
	Monagas	6	
	Nueva Esparta	5	
	Portuguesa	6	
	Sucre	6	
	Táchira	7	
	Trujillo	5	
	Vargas	4	
	Yaracuy	5	
	Zulia	15	
Bandera de Venezuela.	Indigenous Representation Western, Eastern and Southern Regions	3	
Bandera de Venezuela.	Venezuela	167	

== See also ==
- I National Assembly of Venezuela
- II National Assembly of Venezuela
- III National Assembly of Venezuela
- V National Assembly of Venezuela
- VI National Assembly of Venezuela
