= Rosa Petit =

Venezuelan politician

- Occupation: Politician
- Political party: A New Era

Alternate Deputy for the National Assembly of Venezuela
- Incumbent
- Assumed office 5 January 2016
- Constituency: Amazonas

Rosa Verónica Petit De Castillo is a Venezuelan politician, currently an alternate deputy of the National Assembly for the Amazonas state.

== Career ==
Petit was elected as alternate deputy for the National Assembly for the Amazonas state for the 2016-2021 period in the 2015 parliamentary elections, representing the Democratic Unity Roundtable (MUD). In 2019 Petit was included in a list presented by deputy Delsa Solórzano of 123 deputies, between main and alternate, who have been victims of "violations of their human rights, as well as threats, intimidation or illegal suspension of their mandate in the current legislative period.". On 12 August of the same year, she announced his decision to join the A New Era party along with other deputies and leaders. In 2022, she was among the representatives of Venezuelan organizations and indigenous peoples who signed a document condemning the killing of four Yanomami indigenous people on 20 March by the Armed Forces.

== See also ==
- IV National Assembly of Venezuela
