= Desiree Barboza =

Venezuelan politician

National Assembly alternate deputy
- Incumbent
- Assumed office 5 January 2016
- Constituency: Zulia state

Personal details
- Party: Popular Will
- Occupation: Politician

Desiree Barboza is a Venezuelan politician, currently an alternate deputy of the National Assembly for the Zulia state.

== Career ==
Barboza has been regional coordinator of the Popular Will party in Zulia state. She was elected as an alternate deputy to the National Assembly for the state for the 2016–2021 term in the 2015 parliamentary elections, representing the Democratic Unity Roundtable (MUD). In 2019, she was included in a list presented by Deputy Delsa Solórzano of deputies, including principal and alternate deputies, who have been victims of "violations of their human rights, as well as threats, intimidation or illegal suspension of their mandate in the current legislative term." After the election of the 2020 National Assembly's Delegate Commission and opposition deputies regained control of the Assembly on 7 January, four deputies were injured, including Barboza. Desiree was nominated as Voluntad Popular's pre-candidate for mayor of Lagunillas municipality for the 2021 municipal elections.

In 2022 she was awarded the Ana María Campos Order by the Legislative Council of Zulia on the occasion of International Women's Day.

== See also ==
- IV National Assembly of Venezuela
