= Yolanda Tortolero =

Venezuelan politician (died 2021)

- Died: 18 May 2021; San Felipe (Venezuela)
- Occupation: Politician
- Political party: A New Era

Yolanda Tortolero Martínez (died 18 May 2021) was a Venezuelan physician and politician, alternate deputy of the National Assembly for the Carabobo state and the A New Era party.

== Career ==
Tortolero was a physician by profession and worked at the Bejuma Hospital for several years, a town in the Carabobo state where she was from. She was elected as alternate deputy for the National Assembly for Carabobo for the period 2016–2021 in the 2015 parliamentary elections, representing the Democratic Unity Roundtable (MUD) and the A New Era (UNT in Spanish) party. In 2020 she was one of the 100 deputies to vote in person in favor of reelecting Juan Guaidó as president of the Assembly in the National Assembly Delegated Committee election.

In 2021 she was hospitalized in San Felipe, Yaracuy state; her party, colleagues and inhabitants of Bejuma asked for financial assistance for her medical attention. Although her death had originally been reported by 14 May, the regional executive board of UNT in Carabobo informed that by that date the parliamentarian was still alive. After fighting against COVID-19 for about three weeks, Tortolero died on 18 May from complications derived from the disease.

== See also ==
- IV National Assembly of Venezuela
