= Auristela Vásquez =

Venezuelan politician

National Assembly alternate deputy
- Incumbent
- Assumed office 5 January 2016
- Constituency: Second circuit of the Capital district

Personal details
- Born: 20th century Venezuela
- Occupation: Politician

Auristela Vásquez is a Venezuelan politician and alternate deputy of the National Assembly for the Capital District. She is currently in exile in Spain.

== Career ==
Auristela was elected as alternate deputy for the National Assembly for Circuit 2 of the Capital District for the 2016-2021 period in the 2015 parliamentary elections, representing the Democratic Unity Roundtable (MUD). Subsequently, she was appointed by Juan Guaidó as vice president of the Permanent Commission of Social Development for the period 2022–2023.

On 5 January 2023, she was elected second vice-president of the parliament by the deputies of the IV National Assembly. On 8 January, the government of Nicolás Maduro issued an arrest warrant against her and congresswomen Marianela Fernández and Dinorah Figuera.

== See also ==
- IV National Assembly of Venezuela
