= Oneida Guaipe =

Venezuelan politician

National Assembly of Venezuela alternate deputy
- Incumbent
- Assumed office 5 January 2016
- Constituency: Anzoátegui state (3rd circuit)

Personal details
- Born: Oneida Del Valle Guaipe de Ávila
- Occupation: Politician

Oneida Del Valle Guaipe de Ávila is a Venezuelan politician, currently an alternate deputy of the National Assembly for the Anzoátegui state. Before being elected as deputy, Oneida served as a union leader of public employees in the health sector in the state.

== Career ==
Before being elected as a deputy, Oneida worked as a union leader, being secretary of organization of the Sindicato Único de Empleados Públicos of the health sector in the Anzoátegui state (Sunepsas). She was elected as alternate deputy for the National Assembly for circuit 3 of Anzoátegui state for the 2016–2021 term in the 2015 parliamentary elections, representing the Democratic Unity Roundtable (MUD). Guaipe was among the deputies who voted, as alternate for deputy Richard Arteaga, to ratify Juan Guaidó as president of the National Assembly in the 2020 Assembly Delegated Committee election.

Subsequently, in 2022, she was appointed by Juan Guaidó as vice president of the Permanent Commission of Energy and Petroleum for the period 2022–2023.

== See also ==
- IV National Assembly of Venezuela
