= María Verónica Rengifo =

Venezuelan politician

National Assembly alternate deputy
- Constituency: Aragua state

Personal details
- Occupation: Politician

María Verónica Rengifo is a Venezuelan politician, currently an alternate deputy of the National Assembly for the Aragua state.

== Career ==
She was elected as alternate deputy for the National Assembly for Aragua state for the 2016–2021 term in the 2015 parliamentary elections, representing the Democratic Unity Roundtable (MUD). In 2017 she joined the newly created parliamentary fraction 16 de Julio. Rengifo participated in the national protests that year against the government of Nicolás Maduro, and on 19 June she was wounded in the leg by three pellets during a protest in El Paraíso, Caracas, fired from a checkpoint of the Bolivarian National Guard.

== Personal life ==
During the 2017 nationwide protests, Rengifo's mother and brother were also injured by buckshot fired by Aragua state police officers.

== See also ==
- IV National Assembly of Venezuela
