= Belkis Ulacio =

Venezuelan politician

Alternate deputy of the National Assembly of Venezuela
- Incumbent
- Assumed office 5 January 2016

Belkis Ulacio is a Venezuelan politician, currently an alternate deputy of the National Assembly for the Vargas state.

== Career ==
Ulacio was elected as alternate deputy to the National Assembly for Vargas state for the 2016-2021 term during the 2015 parliamentary elections, representing the Democratic Unity Roundtable (MUD).

== See also ==
- IV National Assembly of Venezuela
- Ana Mercedes Aponte
