= Mary Morales =

Venezuelan politician

National Assembly alternate deputy
- Constituency: Mérida state

Personal details
- Occupation: Politician

Mary Mora Morales is a Venezuelan politician, currently an alternate deputy in the National Assembly for the Mérida state.

== Career ==
Morales was elected as alternate deputy for the National Assembly for the Mérida state for the 2016–2021 term in the 2015 parliamentary elections, representing the Democratic Unity Roundtable (MUD).

== See also ==
- IV National Assembly of Venezuela
