= Magalvi Estaba =

Venezuelan politician

National Assembly of Venezuela alternate deputy
- Incumbent
- Assumed office 5 January 2016
- Constituency: Nueva Esparta state (1st circuit)

Personal details
- Born: Magalvi José Estaba Mata; November 9, 1957 (age 68)
- Occupation: Politician

Magalvi José Estaba Mata (9 November 1957) is a Venezuelan politician, currently an alternate deputy of the National Assembly for the Nueva Esparta state.

== Career ==
Magalvi was elected as alternate deputy for the National Assembly for the Nueva Esparta state for the period 2016–2021 in the 2015 parliamentary elections, representing the Democratic Unity Roundtable (MUD). In 2021, she was among the deputies who rejected the regional elections of the same year due to the lack of guarantees in the process.

== See also ==
- IV National Assembly of Venezuela
