= Elimar Díaz =

Venezuelan politician (born 1989)

National Assembly deputy
- Incumbent
- Assumed office 5 January 2016
- Constituency: Zulia state

Personal details
- Born: 8 October 1989 (age 37)
- Party: A New Era
- Occupation: Politician

Elimar Díaz (born 8 October 1989) is a Venezuelan politician, deputy of the National Assembly for the Zulia state and the A New Era party.

== Career ==
Milagros has been youth secretary of A New Era party in the Zulia state. According to the Venezuelan Institute of Social Security, she worked for the mayor's office of Maracaibo until September 2015. She was elected as deputy for the National Assembly for circuit 4 of Zulia state for the 2016–2021 term in the 2015 parliamentary elections, representing the Democratic Unity Roundtable and the A New Era party. In 2016 she was a member of the Permanent Commission of Cults and Penitentiary Regime, and for the 2017-2018 period she chaired the Permanent Commission of Culture and Recreation.

She was afterwards appointed by Juan Guaidó as vice-president of the Permanent Commission of Comptrollership for the 2022–2023 term.

== See also ==
- IV National Assembly of Venezuela
