= Deyalitza Aray =

Venezuelan politician

Acting deputy for the National Assembly of Venezuela
- Constituency: Carabobo state

Personal details
- Occupation: Politician

Deyalitza Aray is a Venezuelan politician, alternate deputy of the National Assembly for the Carabobo state.

== Career ==
Aray was elected as alternate deputy for the National Assembly for the Carabobo state for the 2016–2021 term in the 2015 parliamentary election, representing the Democratic Unity Roundtable (MUD). On 11 February 2020, she moved to Vargas state in a bus along with other deputies to receive Juan Guaidó after he went on an international tour. A checkpoint of the Bolivarian National Police prevented the passage of buses and detained her for more than four hours, releasing her in the evening.

She was subsequently appointed by Juan Guaidó, as president of the Parliament Permanent Family Commission for the 2022-2023 period.

== See also ==
- III National Assembly of Venezuela
- IV National Assembly of Venezuela
