= Fátima Soares =

Venezuelan politician

National Assembly alternate deputy
- Incumbent
- Assumed office 5 January 2016
- Constituency: Capital District

Personal details
- Occupation: Politician

María de Fátima Soares Valente is a Venezuelan politician. She is the National Assembly's alternate deputy for the Capital District.

== Career ==
Soares was elected as National Assembly alternate deputy for the Capital District for the 2016–2021 term in the 2015 parliamentary elections. She is the alternate of deputy Marialbert Barrios and has been a member of the Parliamentary Commission of Culture and Recreation.

== See also ==
- IV National Assembly of Venezuela
