= Mildred Carrero =

Venezuelan politician

National Assembly deputy
- Incumbent
- Assumed office 5 January 2016
- Constituency: Mérida state

Personal details
- Born: Mildred Carrero
- Party: Democratic Action
- Occupation: Politician

Mildred Carrero Paredes is a Venezuelan politician, deputy of the National Assembly for the Mérida state. Carrero assumed the position as acting deputy after the main deputy Addy Valero died of cancer in 2020.

== Career ==
Carrero was elected as alternate deputy for the National Assembly for the Mérida state for the period 2016–2021 in the 2015 parliamentary elections, representing the Democratic Unity Roundtable (MUD). Carrero assumed the position as acting deputy after the main deputy Addy Valero died of cancer on 22 January 2020.

== See also ==
- IV National Assembly of Venezuela
