= Nafir Morales =

Venezuelan politician

National Assembly of Venezuela alternate deputy
- Constituency: Capital District 1st circuit

Personal details
- Party: Democratic Unity Roundtable
- Occupation: Politician

Nafir Morales is a Venezuelan politician, currently an alternate deputy of the National Assembly for the Capital District.

== Career ==
Nafir was elected as alternate deputy for the National Assembly for Circuit 1 of the Capital District for the 2016–2021 term in the 2015 parliamentary elections, representing the Democratic Unity Roundtable (MUD). In 2017 she joined the newly created parliamentary fraction 16 de Julio. In 2021, she was among the deputies who rejected the regional elections of the same year due to the lack of guarantees in the elections. Morales also signed the Madrid Charter.

== See also ==
- IV National Assembly of Venezuela
