= Dignora Hernández =

Venezuelan politician

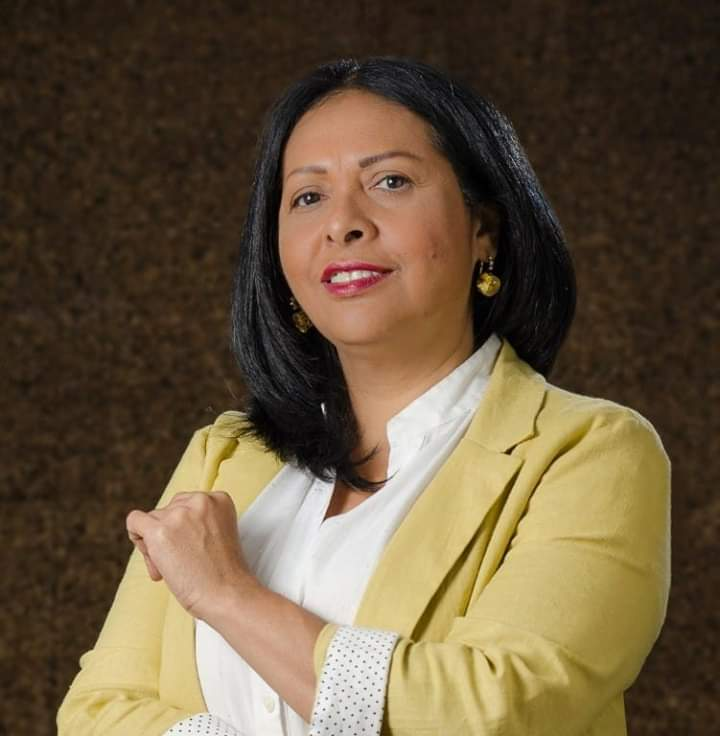

National Assembly alternate deputy
- In office 5 January 2016 – 5 January 2021
- Constituency: Monagas state

Personal details
- Born: 12 August 1968 (age 57)
- Party: Cuentas Claras
- Occupation: Politician

Dignora Hernández born 12 August 1968 is a Venezuelan politician, alternate deputy of the National Assembly for the Monagas state and the Cuentas Claras party.

== Career ==
Hernández has a degree in education. According to the Venezuelan Institute of Social Security, until July 2015 she contributed for Soluciones Quantum Pro, C.A. Hernández was elected as alternate deputy for the National Assembly for the Monagas state for the period 2016–2021 in the 2015 parliamentary elections, representing the Democratic Unity Roundtable (MUD) and the Cuentas Claras party. Dignora later joined the "16 July" parliamentary fraction, along with twelve other deputies from the Convergencia, Vente Venezuela and Alianza Venezuela parties, where she would be its deputy leader. She was one of the signatories of the Madrid Charter.

On 3 January 2022, the Delegate Commission of the National Assembly-2015 approved the Partial Reform to the Statute governing the Transition to Democracy and gives continuity to President Juan Guaidó. The measure was approved with the votes of the broad majority of the body and two abstentions votes of Luis Barragán and Dignora Hernández.

== See also ==
- IV National Assembly of Venezuela
