= Bibiana Lucas =

Venezuelan politician

National Assembly alternate deputy
- Incumbent
- Assumed office 5 January 2016
- Constituency: Guárico state

Personal details
- Party: Primero Justicia
- Occupation: Politician

Bibiana Lucas is a Venezuelan politician, currently an alternate deputy of the National Assembly for the Guárico state. In 2021 she chaired the Investigation Commission of the company Monómeros.

== Career ==
Bibiana was elected as alternate deputy for the National Assembly for the Guárico state for the period 2016–2021 in the 2015 parliamentary elections, representing the Democratic Unity Roundtable (MUD). On 12 October 2021 Lucas was appointed by the Legislative Delegate Commission of the Assembly as president of the Monómeros Investigating Commission, which traveled to Colombia to evaluate the company's situation. On 28 October, Bibiana presented a summary of the 53-page report of the commission's findings at a virtual press conference.

== See also ==
- IV Legislatura de la Asamblea Nacional de Venezuela
