= Liz Carolina Jaramillo =

Venezuelan politician (born 1981)

Liz Carolina Jaramillo De Miranda (born 2 August 1981) is a Venezuelan politician, currently an alternate deputy of the National Assembly for the Aragua state.

== Career ==
She was elected as alternate deputy for the National Assembly for Circuit 4 of Aragua state for the 2016–2021 term in the 2015 parliamentary elections, representing the Democratic Unity Roundtable (MUD) opposition coalition. She has also been a member of the committee of legislators before the Mercosur Parliament. In 2021, it was reported that she had been encouraged to run for mayor of San Sebastián de Aragua, but that in the end it would have been almost impossible for her to compete with the two male candidates who ran.

Afterwards, in 2022, she was appointed as Vice President of the Parliamentary Committee on Administration and Services for the 2022–2023 term.

== Personal life ==
During the COVID-19 pandemic, her mother died in March 2021 from complications related to the disease. By that year, she was the only daughter in the country to care for her father. Jaramillo is the wife of the mayor of San Sebastián de los Reyes municipality in Aragua, Carlos "Koyak" Miranda.

== See also ==
- IV National Assembly of Venezuela
