= Milagros Paz =

Venezuelan journalist and politician (born 1962)

National Assembly of Venezuela deputy
- Constituency: 3rd circuit of Sucre state

Personal details
- Born: 5 April 1962 (age 64)
- Party: Justice First

Milagros de Jesús Paz Fuenmayor (5 April 1962) is a Venezuelan journalist and politician, deputy of the National Assembly for the Sucre state and the Justice First party.

== Career ==
Milagros graduated with a degree in social communication from University of Zulia. She has been regional coordinator of the Justice First party in Sucre state, and in 2015 denounced the disqualification of María Corina Machado as deputy. Paz was elected as deputy for the National Assembly for the 3rd circuit of Sucre state for the 2016-2021 period in the 2015 parliamentary elections, representing the Democratic Unity Roundtable coalition for Justice First. She has been a member of the Parliamentary Commission of Energy and Petroleum and the Parliamentary Commission of Natural Resources and Climate Change.

== See also ==
- IV National Assembly of Venezuela
