= Carmen Sivoli =

Venezuelan politician

National Assembly deputy (acting)
- Constituency: Mérida state

Personal details
- Occupation: Politician

Carmen María Sivoli is a Venezuelan politician, deputy of the National Assembly for the Mérida state.

== Career ==
Sivoli was elected as alternate deputy in the National Assembly for the state of Mérida for the 2016–2021 term in the 2015 parliamentary elections.

On 22 June 2017, during the national protests of that year, she was wounded in one of her legs after being shot by security forces with buckshot in Ejido, in Mérida. After the elections to the National Constituent Assembly, the raid on the residence of the mayor of her municipality, Campo Elías, and a person close to the ruling party called her and recommended her to do so, Sivoli left the country to Colombia, from where she later moved to Buenos Aires, Argentina, where her children lived. However, she expressed her intention to return to Venezuela.

Sivoli participated in the extraordinary session of the National Assembly on 26 December 2020 in which the extension of the Assembly's mandate was approved.

== See also ==
- IV National Assembly of Venezuela
