= María Teresa Pérez (Venezuelan politician) =

Venezuelan politician

National Assembly deputy
- Constituency: Lara state 1st circuit

Personal details
- Party: Progressive Advance
- Education: Universidad Centro Occidental Lisandro Alvarado
- Occupation: Politician

María Teresa Pérez is a Venezuelan politician, deputy of the National Assembly for the Lara state and the Progressive Advance party.

== Career ==
María Teresa is a surgeon graduated from Universidad Centro Occidental Lisandro Alvarado, in Barquisimeto. As of 10 January 2013, she replaced Ileana Guarenas as regional health director of the Lara state governor's office. She was elected as deputy for the National Assembly for the 2016-2021 period, as candidate for circuit 1 of Lara state in the 2015 parliamentary elections, representing the Democratic Unity Roundtable for the Progressive Advance party. She has been a member of the Parliamentary Commission of Integral Social Development.
