= Ulacio =

Ulacio is a surname. Notable people with the surname include:

- Belkis Ulacio, Venezuelan politician
- Yaribeth Ulacio (born 1993), Venezuelan footballer
