= Milagro Valero =

Venezuelan politician

National Assembly of Venezuela deputy
- Constituency: Mérida state 4th circuit

Personal details
- Born: 10 July 1988 (age 37)
- Party: Justice First
- Occupation: Politician

Milagro Valero (born 10 July 1988) is a Venezuelan politician who served as a deputy of the National Assembly the for Mérida state and the Justice First party.

== Career ==
Valero has a degree in social sciences. She has been regional secretary general of the Justice First party in the Mérida state. She was elected as deputy for the National Assembly for Circuit 4 of the Mérida state for the period 2016–2021 in the 2015 parliamentary elections, representing the Democratic Unity Roundtable (MUD) and Justice First. In 2016 she was a member of the Parliamentary Commission of Comptrollership.

Milagro has been exiled in Spain since early 2019.
