= Luis Florido =

Venezuelan politician and administrator (born 1966)

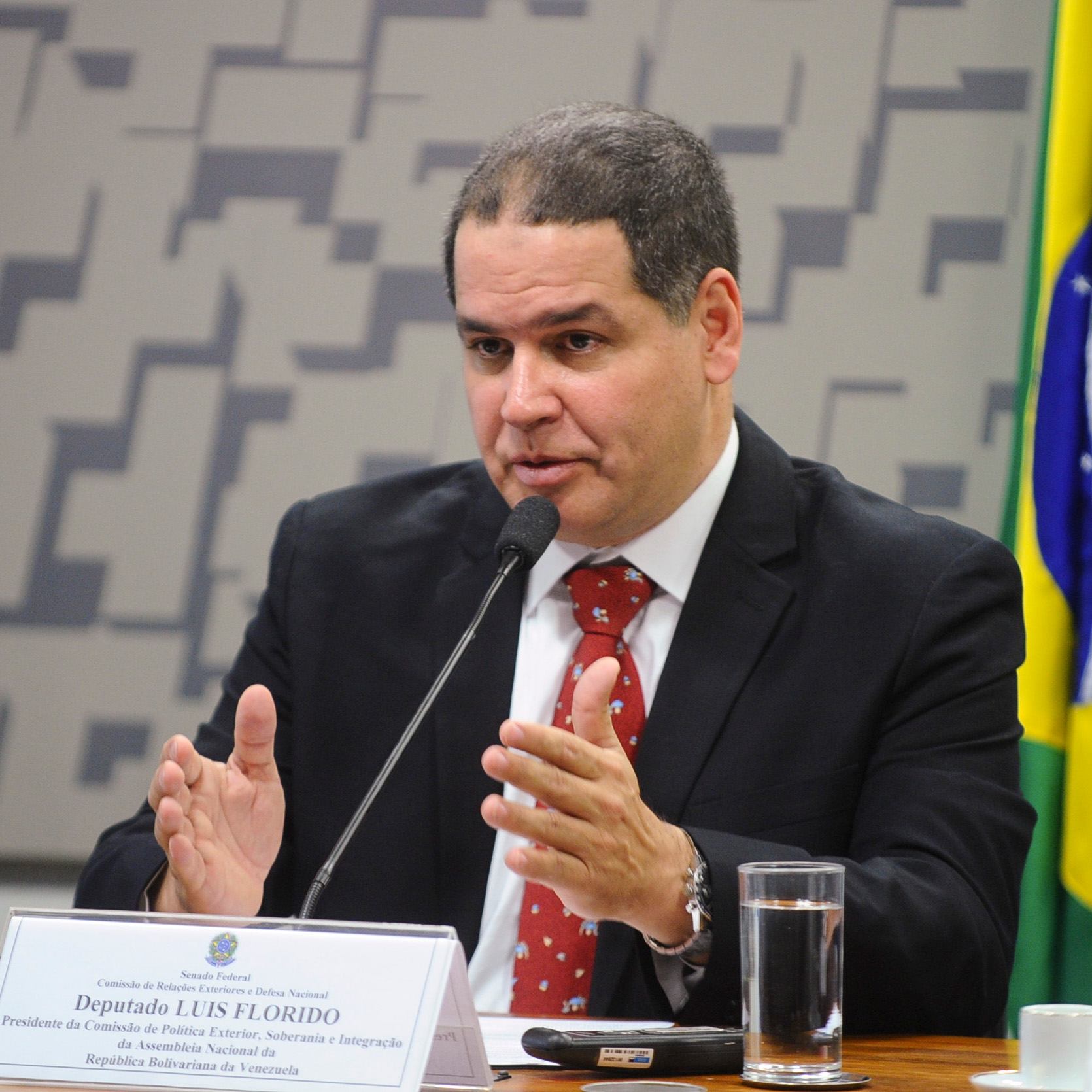
- Florido in 2018

Deputy of the National Assembly for Lara State
- In office 5 January 2016 – 5 January 2021

Deputy of the Latin American Parliament for Venezuela
- In office 24 February 2016 – 5 January 2021

Personal details
- Born: Luis Germán Florido Barreto; 18 September 1966 (age 58); Barquisimeto, Venezuela
- Citizenship: Venezuelan; Spanish
- Political party: Popular Will (Until 2018); Un Nuevo Tiempo (2019–present)

Luis Germán Florido Barreto (born September 18, 1966) is a Venezuelan politician and administrator who served as National Assembly deputy from 2016 to 2021, representing Lara State for the Voluntad Popular political party. He was president of the Foreign Policy Commission of the National Assembly from 2016 to 2018.

On October 26, 2018, the Prime Minister of Spain, Pedro Sánchez, in a meeting with the Council of Ministers, granted him Spanish citizenship.
