= Gladys Guaipo =

Venezuelan politician

National Assembly deputy
- Incumbent
- Assumed office 5 January 2016
- Constituency: Indigenous Representation, Eastern Region

Personal details
- Born: Gladys Margarita Guaipo de García; 18 June 1954 (age 71)
- Party: Democratic Action
- Occupation: Politician

Gladys Margarita Guaipo de García (born 18 June 1954) is a Venezuelan politician, deputy of the National Assembly for the indigenous representation of the Eastern Region of the country for the Democratic Action party. Guaipo belongs to the Cumanagoto people.

== Carrera ==
Guaipo belongs to the Cumanagoto people and worked for the Venezuelan Ministry of Education until February 2012. She was elected as a member of the National Assembly for the indigenous representation of the Eastern Region of the country (Anzoátegui, Bolívar, Delta Amacuro, Monagas and Sucre states) for the 2016–2021 term in the 2015 parliamentary elections, representing the Democratic Unity Roundtable and the Democratic Action party.

Guaipo chaired the Parliamentary Committee on Indigenous Peoples for the 2018–2019 term. He has also participated in the Joint Commission for the Creation of the Orinoco Mining Arc National Strategic Development Zone.

== See also ==
- IV National Assembly of Venezuela
