= Karin Salanova =

Venezuelan politician (born 1975)

Karin Salanova (born 29 January 1975) is a Venezuelan politician, deputy of the National Assembly for circuit 3 of Aragua state and the Justice First opposition party.

== Career ==
Karin graduated as a lawyer from Universidad Santa María in Caracas.

Salanova served as state secretary of the Justice First party and as president of the municipal council of José Félix Ribas for the 2015–2016 term. She was elected deputy of the National Assembly for circuit 3 of Aragua state in the 2015 parliamentary elections representing the Democratic Unity Roundtable (MUD) opposition coalition, for Justice First party. She was known as "the 112th", as she was among the last deputies to be proclaimed. In 2016, she joined the Permanent Family Commission, and for the 2018–2019 period Salanova served as its vice-president.
