= Germán Mavare =

Politician

Germán Mavare (died May 6, 2016) was a local politician of the Venezuelan centre-left party A New Era, leading the urbanization (municipality) of Carucieña in Barquisimeto, Lara.

== Death ==
On May 5, 2016, Mavare, a secretary for social engagement of his party, was reported to have been distributing political fliers late at night when he was approached by a motorcyclist, who asked Mavare his name before shooting him in the head. He died in hospital in the early hours of the morning. His party described the killing as an assassination. Other media publications speculated that the primary motive for the attack was theft of Mavare's mobile phone.
