= Stalin González =

Venezuelan politician

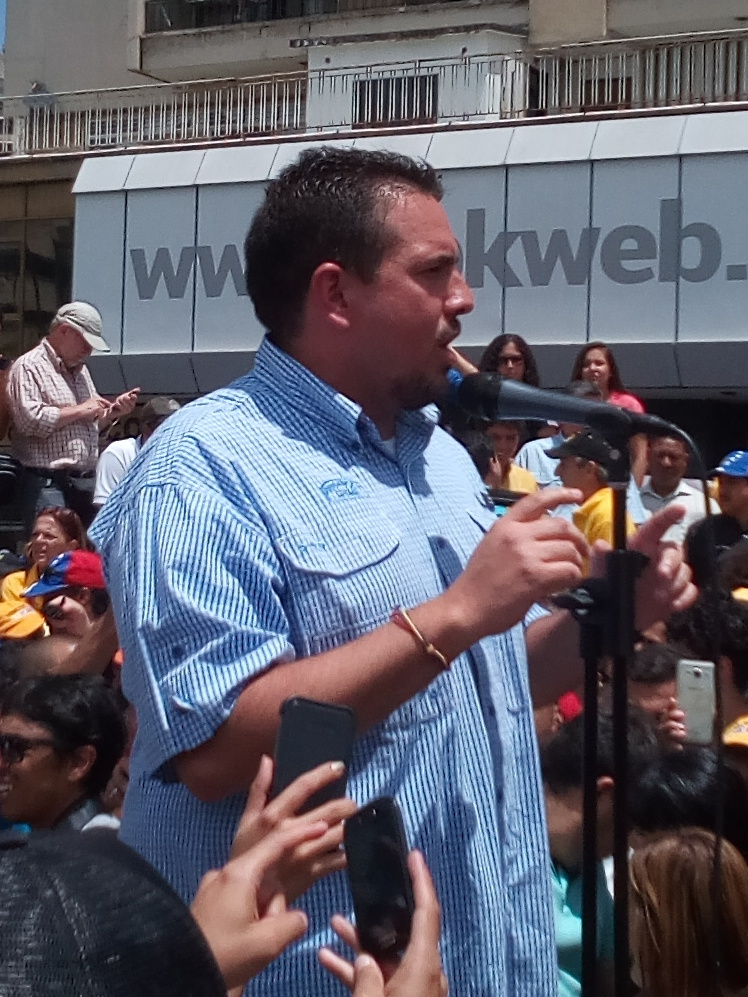
Stalin González during the Venezuelan National Assembly special session in Brión Square, Caracas, on 1 April 2017

Iván Stalin González Montaño (born 13 November 1980) is a Venezuelan lawyer and politician. On 26 September 2010 he was elected as deputy of the National Assembly for the fifth electoral district of Caracas, he presided the Administration and Services Parliamentary Commission and between 2016 and 2017 he was elected as leader of the MUD opposition fraction. On 2019 he was named second Vice President of the Assembly.

During the 2019 Venezuelan presidential crisis, he worked as an aide to Juan Guaidó.
