= Olivia Lozano =

Venezuelan politician (born 1959)

National Assembly of Venezuela deputy
- Constituency: Bolívar state 1st circuit

Personal details
- Born: 17 September 1959 (age 67)
- Party: Popular Will
- Education: University of Carabobo
- Occupation: Politician

Olivia Lozano (born 17 September 1959) is a Venezuelan politician, deputy of the National Assembly of Venezuela for Bolívar state and the Popular Will party.

== Career ==
Olivia graduated as a lawyer from the University of Carabobo. She has been coordinator and in charge of the Popular Will party in the Bolívar state. She was elected as deputy for the National Assembly of Venezuela for the 2016-2021 period for circuit 1 of Bolívar state in the 2015 parliamentary elections representing the Democratic Unity Roundtable (MUD), obtaining 110 805 votes by the nominal system. Between 2018 and 2019, she served as vice president of the Popular Power and Media Parliamentary Commission. On 31 January 2021, she was appointed president of the Foreign Policy, Sovereignty and Integration Committee of the Assembly.
