= Arkiely Perfecto =

Venezuelan politician (born 1987)

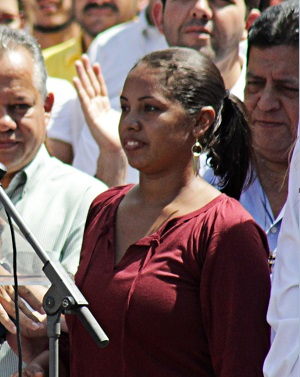
Arkiely Perfecto

Arkiely Evoni Perfecto Gamero (born 15 November 1987) is a Venezuelan politician who serves as a deputy to the National Assembly. Although, Perfecto is against Nicolás Maduro, she supports the legacy of former President Hugo Chávez.

== Biography ==
=== Personal life ===
Arkiely Perfecto was born and raised in the Laguna de Tacarigua National Park, located in Barlovento. Daughter of fishermen and with two sisters, she was raised by her grandmother until she was nine years old. Her basic and secondary education was made in a school located in the municipality of Rio Chico. Later he began a university career, in special education, which she did not complete.

=== Political career ===
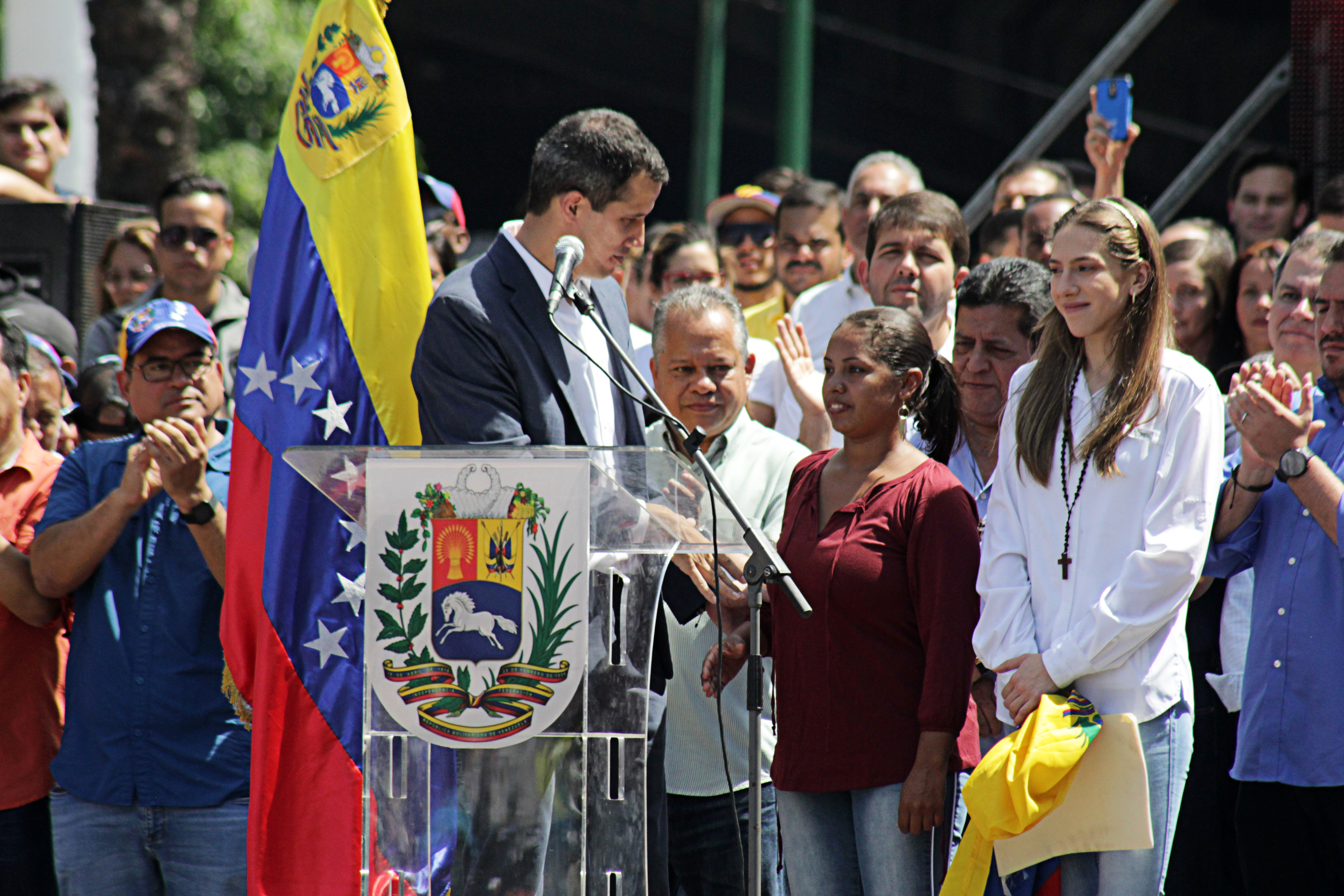
Perfecto (center) with Juan Guaidó

In 2015, she was elected as a candidate for deputy of Nora Delgado by the Tupamaro Movement, a party in which she had been active since previous years. In the 2015 parliamentary elections, she was elected as deputy for the 2016–2021 period by circuit 5 of the Miranda State. In 2017, Delgado was elected mayor of the Brión Municipality, however, Perfect did not assume ownership of the circuit.

On 29 January 2019, she assumed as the main deputy before the National Assembly, disengaging herself from the bench of the Great Patriotic Pole to enter the opposition bench with the support of her party, Movement for Democracy and Inclusion, led by Nicmer Evans. Perfecto showed their support for the president in charge, Juan Guaidó, who applauded the decision as a deputy Perfect sworn, saying Miraflores [sic] "is running alone."

On 20 December 2019, she is expelled from her party for ethical reasons, the MDI refers to her vote being bought (about €50,000) by Chavismo so that she is not reelected Guaidó president of the AN in 2020, however, she denies that accusation.
