= Carlos Ramos Rivas =

Venezuelan politician

Carlos Enrique Ramos Rivas (born 23 September 1959, in Mérida) is a Venezuelan politician. He is a deputy at the Venezuelan National Assembly, representing the state of Mérida. He is an economist.

== Studies ==
Carlos Ramos studied economics at the Universidad de los Andes. He later studied political science and city planning.

== Political work ==
He is a member of the social democratic Un Nuevo Tiempo party. He got elected in the 2010 elections with 65.36% of the votes. Carlos Ramos Rivas has criticized the Chávez government on many occasions for promoting corruption. He has specially made criticisms about the unaccounted use of 29 billion dollars from FONDEN, the Fund for Sustainable Development.
