= Jesús Torrealba =

Venezuelan politician and journalist

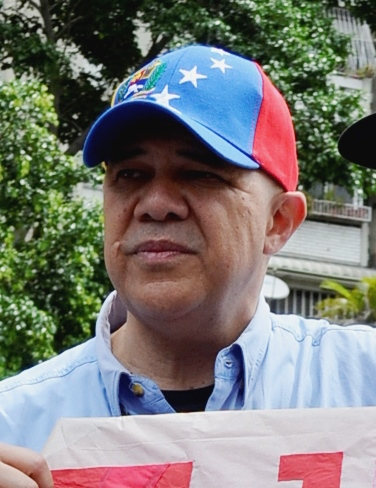

Executive Secretary of the Democratic Unity Roundtable
- In office 23 September 2014 – 17 February 2017
- Preceded by: Ramón Guillermo Aveledo
- Succeeded by: José Luis Cartaya (General Coordinator)

Personal details
- Born: 18 May 1958 (age 68) Caracas, Venezuela
- Party: Communist Party (Before 1974); Democratic Unity Roundtable (2008–present)
- Education: Central University of Venezuela

Jesús Alberto Torrealba Rodríguez (born May 18, 1958 in Caracas), also known as Chúo Torrealba, is a Venezuelan politician and journalist, serving as Secretary-General of the Democratic Unity Roundtable (MUD) from September 24, 2014 to February 17, 2017.

Torrealba was originally active in the Communist Party of Venezuela (PCV) until 1974. In the 1980s, Torrealba trained as a teacher at the Pedagogical Institute of Caracas (IPC) and studied journalism at the Central University of Venezuela (UCV). In 2000 he founded the civil association Radar de los barrios ("Radar of the slums") to promote social work in Caracas. On September 23, 2014, Torrealba was elected Secretary-General of the Venezuelan opposition coalition (MUD).
