= Ana Mercedes Aponte =

Venezuelan politician

National Assembly deputy
- Incumbent
- Assumed office 5 January 2016
- Constituency: Vargas state

Personal details
- Occupation: Politician

Ana Mercedes Aponte Merchan is a Venezuelan politician, deputy of the National Assembly for the Vargas state.

== Career ==
Vera has served as secretary of the Education Workers Union of Vargas (Sitravargas). She was elected as alternate deputy in the National Assembly for the Vargas state for the 2016–2021 term in the 2015 parliamentary elections.

On 16 November 16, 2020, security officers raided her house in Vargas state. Deputy Sandra Flores de Garzón declared that the officers broke the locks of the house and threw the door to the ground, and Mercedes Aponte said that the officers did not have a search warrant for the raid, arguing that they were orders from Nicolás Maduro.
