= Ana María Campos =

Venezuelan fighter

Heroína Ana María Campos
- Ana María de Campos y Cubillán de Fuentes
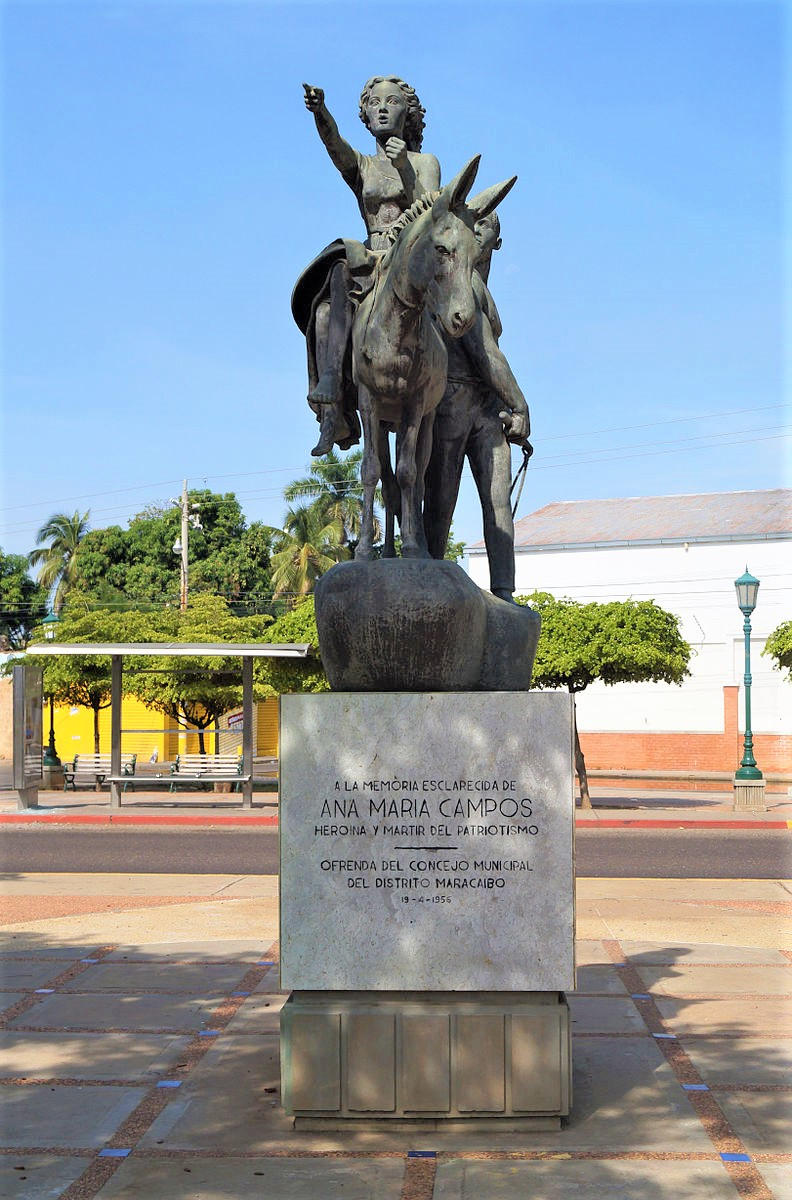
- Monument to Ana María in Maracaibo
- Born: April 2, 1796; Los Puertos de Altagracia, Zulia, Captaincy General of Venezuela, Spanish Empire
- Died: October 17, 1828 (aged 32); Lake Maracaibo, Zulia, Gran Colombia
- Known for: Resistance fighter in the Venezuelan War of Independence

Ana María de Campos y Cubillán de Fuentes (Latin American Spanish: [ˈana maˈɾia ðe ˈkampos i kuβiˈʝan de ˈfwentes]; April 2, 1796 – October 17, 1828) was a resistance fighter in the Venezuelan War of Independence. She was given the honor of "heroine", and is known as a "warrior" and a "martyr".

== Early life ==
Ana María was the daughter of Domingo José de Campos y Perozo de Cervantes, and María Ana Cubillán de Fuentes y Vera. From a young age she was a supporter of the expulsion of the Spanish government.

She came from one of the most aristocratic families in the region, (Note: "Members of the lineage joined the lineage of Pineda and formed a third branch, whose most important representatives were: María Antonia, José María, Miguel, Rafael, Gabriel and Joaquina de Campos y Pineda, who lived in the first half of the 18th century and had many descendants. These people settled in Maracaibo and continued visiting Los Puertos de Altagracia, where they had always had their big summer houses (Nagel von Jess, pp. 89-90). The descendants of Campos y Pineda are vastly numerous, being present in the city of Maracaibo and surrounding regions. Among his descendants are: the Gutiérrez de Celis, the Lossada and Antúnez, the Lares Baralt, the Peredo Hill, and von Jess Lossada, among others.") and received the limited education that was traditional for women in such families, which was primarily restricted to the study of Catholicism. Despite this, she became learned in the arts of society and even in the chivalric code, becoming "known as an accomplished Amazona".

Within high society, Ana María was indirectly exposed to the writings and liberal thoughts of the Age of Enlightenment, and from a young age was reported as having "a thirst for liberty, equality and fraternity", a thirst which would give her reason to resist the Royalist counter-coup of 1821-23.

== Resistance campaigns and arrest ==
Sympathetic to, and then active in, independence causes from childhood, Ana María opened up the rooms of her large family home for the organisation of these forces, and plotted with them.

She is perhaps best known for her actions during the Royalist occupation of Lake Maracaibo, headed up by Field Marshal Francisco Tomás Morales. After hearing of Ana María's attempts to aid the revolution, in September 1822, Morales accused her of organising clandestine meetings to overthrow the crown and had her arrested. One of the pieces of evidence given was something she said in one of the secret meetings: "Si Morales no capitula, monda!" — in the vernacular of the time, "If Morales does not surrender, he dies". She was personally questioned by Morales and confessed to saying the phrase, which had already become a popular chant in Maracaibo.

She refused to apologise to Spain, and was convicted and sentenced to a "public flagellation". This entailed riding through the streets topless, specifically on a donkey instead of on horseback, turning the symbol into one of disgrace. She was lashed at the same time by the public executioner, Valentín Aguirre. It is reported that after every lash he asked her if she wanted to repent, and every time she answered, "Si no capitula, monda". After enduring the torture, she was released. However, the injuries sustained would eventually be the cause of her death.

== Battle of Lake Maracaibo ==
Though beaten, Ana María lived several years longer. The year after her arrest and torture, the battle that she had sought for happened, the Battle of Lake Maracaibo, on July 24, 1823. Still weak from the torture, she took a supporting role in the battle. The revolutionaries won the battle, securing independence for Maracaibo, and forcing Morales to surrender.

== Death ==
Ana María died at age 32, five years after the victory at Lake Maracaibo, from an epileptic seizure that came about from her torture injuries, on the shores of Lake Maracaibo on October 17, 1828.

== Legacy ==
Numerous sites in Maracaibo are named for Ana María, including a street, a public square, and a petrochemical complex. A monument in the public square bearing her name depicts Ana María riding topless on a donkey as a man wields a whip behind her.

In areas of Zulia, the state of Ana María's birth, the bicentennial of her birth was celebrated with a large festival. There was also a push to create more biographies of her at this time, and the Ana María Campos Orchestra was formed. A popular tune in Venezuela was composed and dedicated to Ana María, and is used to commemorate her. It is called the "Canción de primavera", which translates as "Spring Song". In 2016, the Legislative Council of Zulia established the Order Ana María Campos, which is bestowed annually on local women "who actively fight for gender equality and women's empowerment in the different social branches of the country".
