= Addy Valero =

Venezuelan politician (died 2020)

Addy Coromoto Valero Velandria (died 22 January 2020) was a Venezuelan politician who served as a deputy in the National Assembly.

== Career ==
Valero served as an Acción Democrática deputy for the state of Mérida between 1986 and her death in 2020. She was notable for continuing to serve in her role through a cancer diagnosis and for publicly rejecting offers of bribes from the Nicolás Maduro government to support Luis Parra's claims to the National Assembly's presidency in return for medical treatment. Acting President Juan Guaidó later reported that Valero had also been ambushed in her home by Maduro's forces the day before the 2020 National Assembly election, being both threatened and offered money and treatment for her vote to go to Parra; she replied "I can die but Venezuela isn't going to die for my vote".

== Death ==
Valero died of uterine cancer on 22 January 2020, which she had been diagnosed with in 2017. Guaidó added in a memorial message: "It won't have been in vain, Addy. Your wise words and your deep respect for the people is something we will not forget."

== See also ==
- Operación Alacrán
- Mildred Carrero
