= Dinorah Figuera =

Venezuelan politician and physician (born 1961)

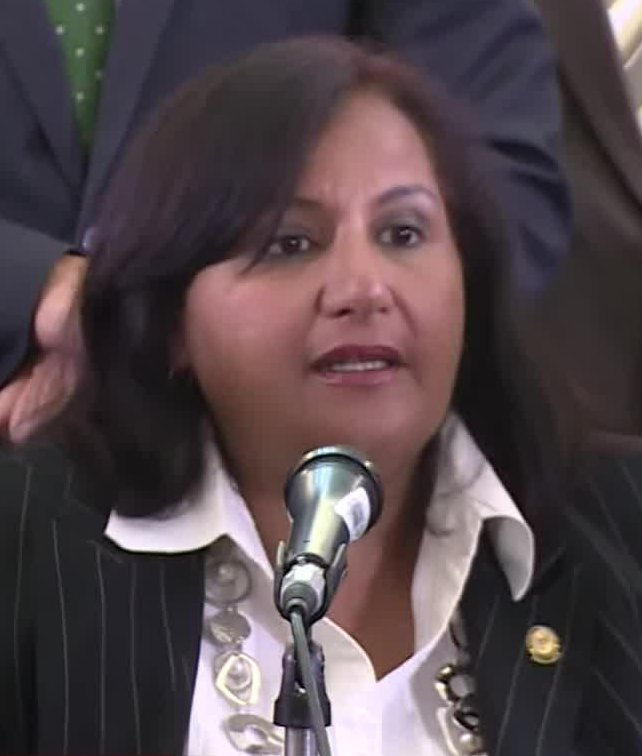
- Figuera in 2017

11th President of the National Assembly of Venezuela
- Incumbent (contested)
- Assumed office 5 January 2023
- Disputed with: Jorge Rodríguez
- Preceded by: Juan Guaidó

Deputy of the National Assembly of Venezuela for Caracas
- In office 5 January 2011 – 5 January 2021

Personal details
- Born: Dinorah Figuera; 15 April 1961 (age 65) Aragua, Venezuela
- Party: Justice First
- Other political affiliations: Radical Cause
- Education: Central University of Venezuela
- Profession: Physician

Dinorah Figuera (born 15 April 1961) is a Venezuelan physician and politician. She is a deputy and president of the IV National Assembly of Venezuela in exile in Spain.

== Career ==
Born in Aragua, Dinorah Figuera was a student leader at the Central University of Venezuela where she graduated as a surgeon in 1991. As a member of Radical Cause party, she was undersecretary of the Libertador Municipality of Caracas between 1993 and 1996, during the administration of Aristóbulo Istúriz. She was a figure during the 2017 protests in Venezuela.

== President of the National Assembly ==
Figuera was elected as a deputy for Caracas in the III National Assembly and for Aragua in the IV National Assembly. Figuera is exiled in Spain after escaping Venezuela through the French embassy in Caracas.

On 5 January 2023, Figuera was elected as president of the IV National Assembly, even though she remains in exile. Figuera was chosen to replace opposition figure Juan Guaidó. After her election, the government of Venezuela issued an arrest warrant against her.

In an interview with Reuters, Figuera said that she was confident that the Biden administration would protect the assets of Citgo Petroleum and the nearly $2 billion in gold that the Venezuelan governments holds in the Bank of England, which has been a dispute between the Maduro government and the opposition.

On 2 April 2023, Figuera released a statement in support of her predecessor, Juan Guaidó, who had earlier denounced that the government planned to arrest him. Figuera condemned the intimidation against Guaidó and solidarized herself with him. In another statement, Figuera deauthorized an opposition deputy who asked for a more softened stance on sanctions from the US, saying that said deputy did not represent the whole opposition National Assembly.
