= Melva Paredes =

Venezuelan politician

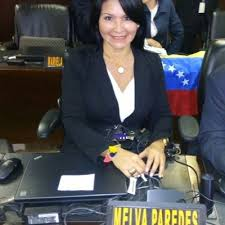
Deputy Melva Paredes.

Melva Matucha Paredes Fischer (born 3 May 1968) is a Venezuelan politician, who is an alternate deputy to the National Assembly of Venezuela by the Aragua state.

== See also ==
- IV National Assembly of Venezuela
