= Delsa Solórzano =

Venezuelan lawyer and politician

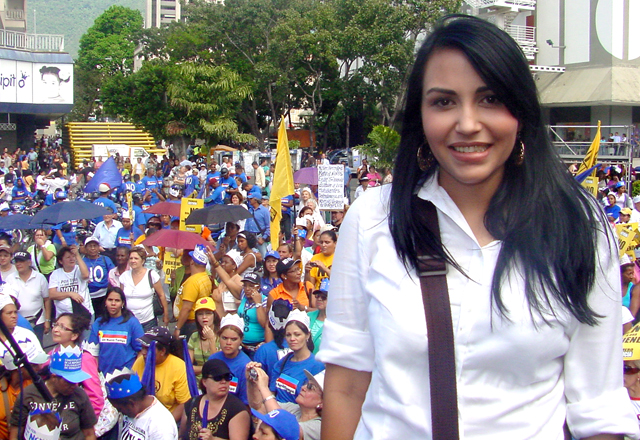
- Solórzano in 2009

Deputy of the National Assembly for Miranda State
- In office 5 January 2016 – 5 January 2021

Deputy of the Latin American Parliament for Venezuela
- In office 7 January 2011 – 5 January 2016

Personal details
- Born: Delsa Jennifer Solórzano Bernal; 18 November 1971 (age 54) El Hatillo, Miranda, Venezuela
- Party: Justice First (2004-2007); Un Nuevo Tiempo (2007–2018); Encuentro Ciudadano (2018–present)
- Spouse: Luis Izquiel
- Children: 1
- Education: Central University of Venezuela
- Occupation: Lawyer, Politician

Delsa Jennifer Solórzano Bernal (born 18 November 1971) is a Venezuelan lawyer and politician. She is currently a deputy of the National Assembly and president of the Internal Affairs Parliamentary Commission, as well as vice president of the Parliamentary Human Rights Commission of the Inter-Parliamentary Union. As of the 13th of December 2018, she is founder and president of the political party Encuentro Ciudadano.

== Early life and career ==
Delsa Jennifer Solórzano Bernal was born on the 15th of November 1971. She studied a degree at the Universidad Central de Venezuela in Criminology and Law.

== National Assembly and Un Nuevo Tiempo ==
During the Venezuelan presidential crisis, she worked on the Amnesty Law for Juan Guaido, serving as deputy of the Latin American Parliament in the 2011-2016 period.

Originally, she was appointed vice president of the social democrat opposition party Un Nuevo Tiempo, from which she separated on 4 December 2018.

== Encuentro Ciudadano ==
On January 28, 2023, Solórzano registered for the 2023 Unitary Platform primary elections representing the Citizen Encounter party. In March, in response to statements by Mr. Jorge Rodríguez, Solórzano declared that "Rodríguez has acknowledged holding the National Electoral Council (CNE) hostage."

== Personal life ==
She is married to the lawyer Luis Izquiel and mother of a child.
