= Marialbert Barrios =

Venezuelan politician

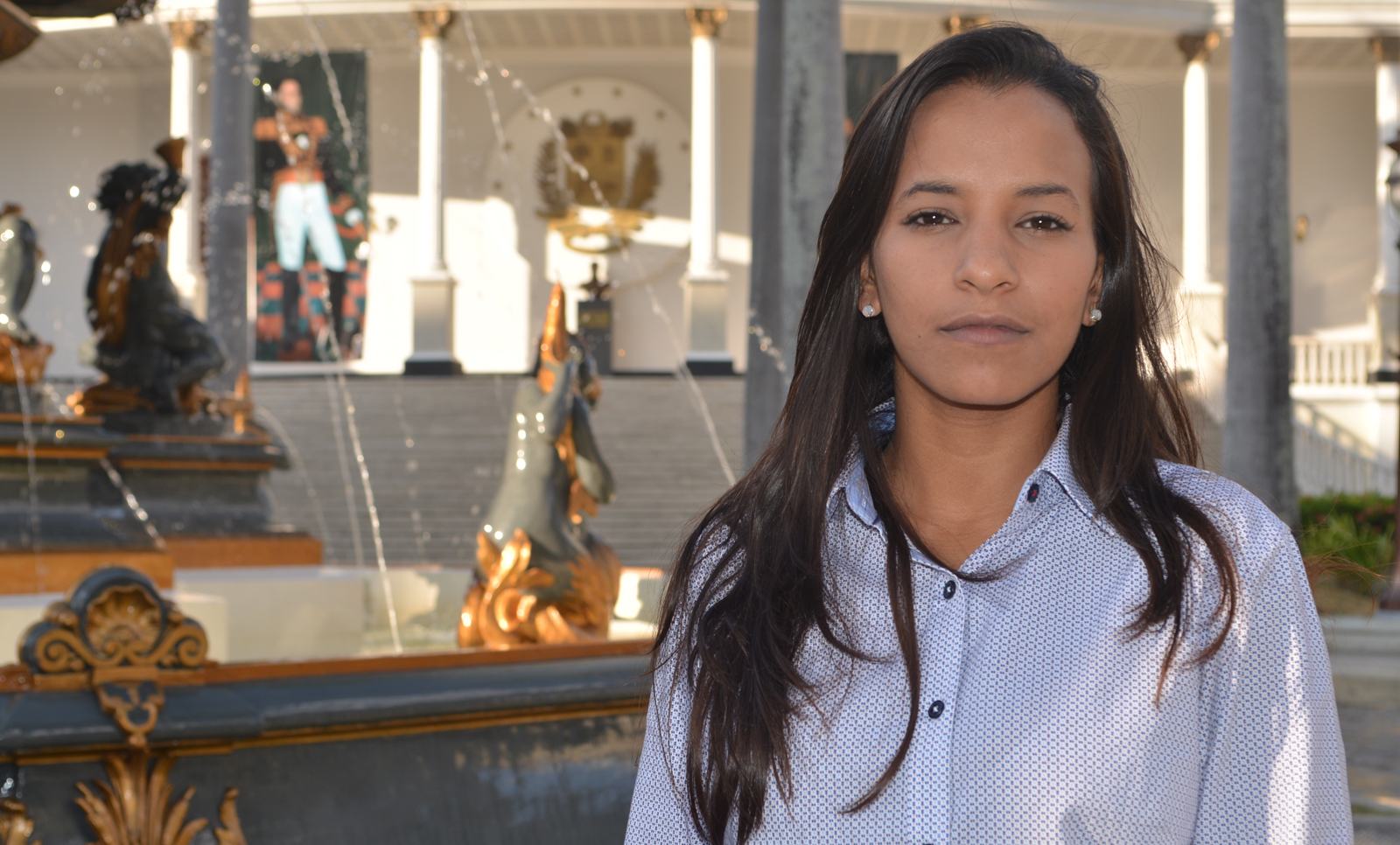

Marialbert Barrios (born 1990) is a Venezuelan politician who was elected to the National Assembly in 2015 and was the youngest member. She represented the district of Catia in western Caracas.
