= Un Nuevo Tiempo =

Venezuelan political party

A New Era Un Nuevo Tiempo
- President: Manuel Rosales
- Founded: 1999; 27 years ago
- Headquarters: Urbanización La Castellana, Av. Principal de La Castellana, Torre Multinvest, piso 1 Chacao, Maracaibo
- Ideology: Social democracy Progressivism; Reformism
- Political position: Centre-left
- National affiliation: Unitary Platform
- International affiliation: Socialist International
- Colours: Blue, red, white
- Slogan: Es democracia social. El buen Gobierno ("It Is Social Democracy. It Is Good Government.")
- National Assembly: 11 / 285
- Governors: 1 / 23
- Mayors: 7 / 337

Website
- www.partidounnuevotiempo.org

Un Nuevo Tiempo (Spanish for 'A New Era', UNT) is a centre-left political party in Venezuela. It received 11% of the vote in the 2008 regional elections. The party arose in Zulia State, Venezuela's most populous state, and remains far stronger in its home region than elsewhere in the country, providing the state governor since 2000 (currently Manuel Rosales) and the mayor of its largest city, Maracaibo (since 2010, currently, Eveling Trejo de Rosales).

Twelve candidates of Un Nuevo Tiempo or supported by Un Nuevo Tiempo were elected deputies to the National Assembly out of 15 in the 2010 Venezuelan parliamentary election. Along with some other opposition parties, Un Nuevo Tiempo boycotted the 2005 Venezuelan parliamentary election. The party's previous leader was Manuel Rosales, Governor of Zulia (2000–2008). He was also its candidate for the 2006 presidential election, attracting 37% of the national vote.

Omar Barboza is the current party president. UNT was admitted into the Socialist International as a consultative member at the SI's spring congress on 4–5 February 2013. It became a full member in 2017. On 6 May 2016, the party reported that a local party leader named Germán Mavare, in Barquisimeto, Lara, had been killed by a gunshot to the head.

== Party platform ==
UNT is a social democratic party. In its party program, the party identifies itself as progressive and leftist. UNT wants reduced Presidential powers and oppose the use of public resources in electoral campaigns. UNT believes in tolerance for religions and political ideologies that are "tolerant". UNT advocates improved prison conditions and the creation of a security force composed of better trained and paid police. UNT also demands legal reform to better favor defendants in criminal trials.

UNT supports combining state economic planning that guides the efforts and expectations of capital, labor and consumption with social markets. They reject neoliberal policies and believe that economic growth must benefit the people more equally. They propose the creation of a Fund for Financing Diversified Development from the surplus of oil revenue. They believe job growth should be the decisive metric in the national economic plan. They also consider important the state planning of a housing construction process carried out by private industry as a powerful factor for the creation of jobs. As well, they propose to encourage and encourage the expansion of SMEs (small and medium-sized enterprises), which are considered providers of mass employment. Finally, the UNT supports labor unions and opposes exchange control and rigid prices as it discourages domestic production.

UNT believes that the oil industry should remain in the hands of the state. However, UNT believes that other sectors, such as metal resources and public utilities, should be run by private-public partnerships or another form of mixed ownership, and opposes further nationalization of industry. They believe that PDVSA should be outside the influence of some partisan control and that the system of appointing its staff should be based on merits and technical and professional capacity. They believe that under the guidance of the State, the private sector should be encouraged through tenders and contracts to convert oil "into the effective engine of a powerful and varied constellation of national industries."

UNT recognizes, despite their "imperfections," the achievements of the 1961 land reform by Rómulo Betancourt to encourage income equality in the countryside by redistributing the land from its few owners to the many. They are in favor of safeguarding private property in the countryside by focusing its strategy on safeguarding labor rights through adequate wages and social security.

UNT wishes to reduce income inequality. However, they recognize the differences between the value and social utility of the contributions of those receiving higher salaries and those receiving lower salaries, as well as the difference in training and responsibility between them. They recognize the successes of the "universal-assistance" method implemented during the first thirty years of democracy by successive governments and oppose the "selective-compensatory" social policy model implemented by the neoliberal governments of Carlos Andres Perez and Rafael Caldera. They criticize them for "populist style" and not leading to collective "self-help" and structural changes.

UNT believes that universities should be autonomous but regulated by the State. They believe that technical education should be favored at the basic education level and that training in various trades should be promoted through the National Institute of Educational Training (INCE) to help the economy and reduce unemployment. They believe that the demand for basic and secondary education should be increased through State incentives. They want to give opportunities to study technical careers to those who do not go to university. UNT believes that pre-school education should receive careful attention from the government as a means to reduce the amount of time parents need to devote to taking care of young children.

== Deputies at the National Assembly ==
- Carlos Ramos Rivas
- José Manuel Olivares
- Melva Paredes
