= 2015 Venezuelan parliamentary election =

- 6 December 2015
- All 167 seats in the National Assembly; 84 seats needed for a majority
- Turnout: 74.04% (▲7.62pp)
Party	Leader	Vote %	Seats	+/–
MUD	Henry Ramos Allup	56.21	112	+47
GPPSB	Diosdado Cabello	40.92	55	−43
This lists parties that won seats. See the complete results below.
Results by constituency and party-list vote by state.
President of the NA before	President of the NA
Diosdado Cabello; PSUV-GPPSB	Henry Ramos Allup; AD-MUD

Parliamentary elections were held in Venezuela on 6 December 2015 to elect the 164 deputies and three indigenous representatives of the National Assembly. They were the fourth parliamentary elections to take place after the 1999 constitution, which abolished the bicameral system in favour of a unicameral parliament, and the first to take place after the death of President Hugo Chávez. Despite predictions from the opposition of a possible last-minute cancellation, the elections took place as scheduled, with the majority of polls showing the Democratic Unity Roundtable (MUD) holding a wide lead over the ruling United Socialist Party of Venezuela (PSUV) and its wider alliance, the Great Patriotic Pole (GPP).

The political landscape leading up to the elections was heavily influenced by the severe economic crisis faced by the country, as well as a series of protests that took place in 2014, after which former Chacao mayor and leader of Popular Will, Leopoldo López, was detained and sentenced to 14 years in prison. The scarcity of basic goods and high inflation were the central topics of discussion, with each party blaming their opponent as the cause. Introducing economic policies to counter the crisis, as well as granting amnesty to political prisoners, was the main campaign pledge of the MUD. The ruling PSUV, on the other hand, ran a campaign focused on overcoming what they called an "economic war" led by the right-wing against the Venezuelan people, as well as defending the legacy of Chávez and the social policies introduced during his presidency.

The result was a decisive defeat for the Chavismo, which lost control of the Assembly for the first time since 1999. The MUD, composed of politicians opposed to the government of both Chávez and his successor, won 109 seats, and with the support of the three indigenous representatives, gained a supermajority of 112 seats against 55 won by the GPP. In terms of popular vote, the MUD received 7.7 million votes, an increase of 2.4 million from the 2010 elections, becoming the most voted party in Venezuelan electoral history. In comparison, the GPP only managed to gain an additional 200,000 votes, to total 5.6 million votes.

== Background ==
Since the 1999 Constitutional Assembly elections, the National Assembly was dominated by alliances supportive of President Hugo Chávez. In the 2005 parliamentary elections, most opposition parties decided to withdraw, resulting in all seats being won by the Fifth Republic Movement and other parties supportive of Chávez. For the 2010 elections, an alliance of opposition parties was formed by the Democratic Unity Roundtable to contest the elections, and managed to win 64 seats. The PSUV, which was an alliance formed by Chávez from the Fifth Republic Movement and a number of smaller parties, won 96 seats, maintaining their majority, but lost their two-thirds and three-fifths supermajority. Fatherland for All, a small left-wing party, won two seats. After Chávez's death in 2013, his hand-picked successor Maduro was narrowly elected president, continuing Chávez' ideological influence. In 2015, the Democratic Unity Roundtable alliance aimed to improve its result from last time and end the incumbent PSUV government, while Maduro said he had faith in the voters giving the government a large majority.

=== Protests ===
In 2014, a series of protests and demonstrations began in Venezuela. The protests have been attributed to inflation, violence and shortages in Venezuela. The protests have been largely peaceful, though some have escalated and resulted in violence from both protesters and government forces. The government has accused the protests of being motivated by 'fascists' opposition leaders, capitalism and foreign influence, and has itself been accused of censorship, supporting groups called colectivos using violence against protesters and politically motivated arrests.

== Electoral system ==
Starting from 2015, the 167 members of the National Assembly were elected by a mixed majoritarian system; 113 members were elected by plurality block voting in 87 constituencies. A total of 51 seats were elected by closed list proportional representation based on the 23 states and the Capital District. Seats were allocated using the d'Hondt method. The remaining three seats were reserved for indigenous peoples, and were elected by the community.

The opposition coalition held primaries on 17 May in 33 of the 87 electoral districts, choosing candidates for 42 seats; 125 additional candidates were expected to be hand-picked by 'consensus' among party leaders, though the rules were later changed to require 40% of opposition candidates to be women and barred some popular opposition candidates from running, a move that experts called unconstitutional. The PSUV held primaries in all 87 electoral districts on 28 June with the Bolivarian government stating there was a participation of 3,162,400 voters, though some observing the primaries noticed a large decrease of voters to less than 1 million participating, or about 10% of PSUV members.

== Opinion polls ==
Graphical summary

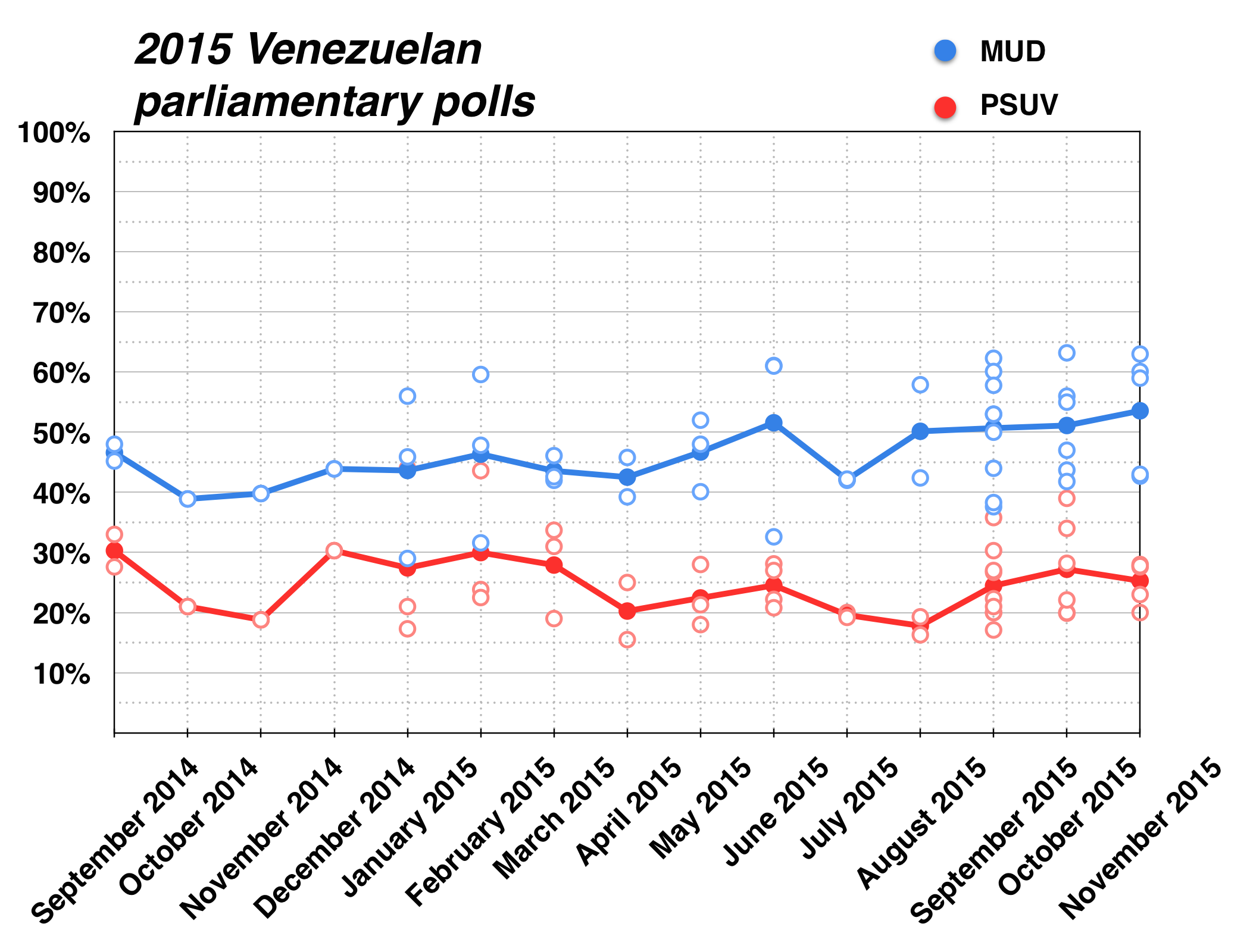
The blue line represents percentage that favor MUD. The red line represents percentage that favor PSUV. Unfilled dots represent individual results of the polls seen below.

Poll results are listed in the tables below in chronological order and using the date the survey's fieldwork was done, as opposed to the date of publication. If such date is unknown, the date of publication is given instead. The highest percentage figure in each polling survey is displayed in bold, and the background shaded in the leading party's colour.

Polling firm	Fieldwork date	Sample size	PSUV/GPP	MUD	Others	Don't know	Lead
IVAD	29 September 2014	800	27.6%	**45.2%**	–	27.2%	17.6%
Consultores 21	21 September – 2 October 2014	1000	33%	**48%**	–		15%
Datanálisis	October 2014	1293	21.0%	**38.9%**	12.9%	17.5%	17.9%
Datanálisis	November 2014	1300	18.8%	**39.8%**	15.5%	17.5%	21%
VARIANZAS	8–23 December 2014	1200	30.3%	**43.9%**	4.9% (Note: Neither)	20.9% (Note: 11.2% Don't know, 7.4% It depends, 2.3 % Won't vote)	13.6%
Datanálisis	January 2015	1000	17.3%	**45.9%**	13.8%	17.4%	28.6%
Keller y Asociados	January 2015	1200	44%	**56%**	–	–	12%
Meganalisis	25 January 2015	–	21.0%	**29.0%**	–	26.8%	8%
Datanálisis	February 2015	?	22.5%	**59.6%**	17.9%	–	37.1%
ICS	10–20 February 2015	1300	**43.6%**	31.6%	–	24.8%	12%
DatinCorp	8 February 2015	1200	23.83%	**47.83%**	–	17% (Note: No vote (no votaría))	24%
Datanálisis	March 2015	1000	19.0%	**42.6%**	8.8%	21.3%	23.6%
Keller y Asociados	26 February – 13 March 2015	1200	31%	**42%**	11%	16%	11%
Datanálisis	April 2015	1000	25.0%	**45.8%**	6.5%	16.5%	20.8%
VARIANZAS	19 March – 2 April 2015	1200	33.7%	**46.1%**	7.8%	12.5%	12.4%
UCAB/Delphos	10–25 April 2015	1200	15.5%	**39.2%**	–	45.7% (Note: 20.7% Don't know, 8.2% Won't vote, 16.4% Neither)	23.7%
Hercón	1–15 May 2015	1200	28%	**52%**	–	19.8% (Note: 11.2% Don't know, 14.2% Won't vote)	24%
DatinCorp	May 2015	1200	18%	**48%**	21%	14%	30%
Datanálisis	18–30 May 2015	1000	21.3%	**40.1%**	10.0%	28.6%	18.8%
Meganalisis	30 May 2015	–	**19.5%**	17.6%	–	**28.7%**	1.9%
IVAD	28 May – 11 June 2015	1200	20.8%	**32.6%**	27.6	19% (Note: "The rest declares themselves undecided.")	11.8%
Datanálisis	June 2015	?	27%	**61%**	12%	–	34%
Hercón	20–27 June 2015	2000	28.1%	**61.1%**	–	10.5%	33%
ICS	6–27 July 2015	8000 (500 per state)	**45.3%**	37.6%	–	17.1%	7.7%
Datanálisis	10–23 July 2015	999	19.2%	**42.2%**	11.8%	17.5%	23%
DatinCorp	July 2015	1197	20%	**42%**	14%	23% (Note: 13% "Wouldn't Vote, 10% "Undecided")	22%
Meganalisis	August 2015	–	16.3%	**42.4%**	–	13.0%	26.1%
IVAD	8–16 August 2015	1200	19.3%	**57.9%**	–	22.8%	38.6%
Keller y Asociados	19 August – 5 September 2015	1200	27%	**53%**	11%	9%	26%
Datanálisis	September 2015	–	21%	**44%**	35%	–	23%
DatinCorp	September 2015	–	20%	**53%**	–		33%
Delphos	September 2015	–	20%	**50%**	20%	10%	30%
Meganalisis	September 2015	–	26.7%	**37.6%**	–	35.7%	10.9%
Venebarómetro/IVAD	5–15 September 2015	1200	17.1%	**38.3%**	28.0%	16.7%	21.2%
Hercon	13–16 September 2015	1000	22.3%	**60.1%**	13.0%	4.6%	37.8%
Consultores 21	4–20 September 2015	–	35.8%	**57.8%**	3.7%	–	22%
Hercon	5–20 September 2015	1200	30.3%	**62.3%**	–	7.3%	32%
Consultores 21	October 2015	–	34%	**55%**	–		21%
Datanálisis	October 2015	–	28.2%	**63.2%**	–		35%
DatinCorp	October 2015	–	20%	**47%**	–		27%
DatinCorp	October 2015	–	39%	**56%**	–		17%
IVAD	October 2015	–	22.1%	**41.8%**			19.7%
Venebarómetro	11 October 2015	–	19.9%	**43.7%**	–	26.5%	23.8%
Keller y Asociados	5–15 November 2015	1200	25%	**59%**	11%	6%	34%
IVAD	10–20 November 2015	1200	27.8%	**43.0%**	11.3%	17.8%	15.2%
Venebarómetro	8–22 November 2015	1200	27.6%	**42.7%**	11.1%	18.7%	15.1%
Hercón	10–25 November 2015	1200	31.6%	**60.1%**	–	8.2%	28.5%
Meganalisis	18–26 November 2015	1200	28%	**63%**	6%	3%	35%

== Conduct ==
Leading up to the elections, serious issues have been raised about its fairness and credibility. On 10 October 2015, Brazil pulled out of a UNASUR electoral mission to observe the Venezuelan election over what it said a lack of guarantees by the socialist government and its veto of the choice to head the delegation. In a statement on 10 November 2015, Secretary General of the Organization of American States Luis Almagro condemned Venezuela's electoral process, explaining that the ruling party, PSUV, has an unfair advantage with its ability to use public assets, media access, creating dubious voting sheets and by disqualifying opposition politicians, stating that "It's worrying that ... the difficulties only impact the opposition parties".

After the election, the opposition MUD coalition was accused of vote-buying in the state of Amazonas. The Supreme Court suspended all four Amazonas delegates (one socialist and three opposition). As of May 2018, these claims have not been proven.

=== United States involvement ===
Venezuela: Improved Training and Communications Skills for Political Activists grant document of the National Endowment for Democracy to assist the Venezuelan opposition

The United States has sought to influence Venezuelan political direction since the 1950s. For the 2015 elections this included mobilising through digital means. Prior to the elections, the National Endowment for Democracy (NED) provided a grant to National Democratic Institute (NDI) for a project called "Venezuela: Improved Training and Communications Skills for Political Activists". After a Freedom of Information Act request from Jacobin, NED provided documents detailing that about $300,000 were granted to the NDI to assist the Venezuelan opposition with workshops to coach politicians and activists on political messaging, especially on social media. The program focused on using Facebook as a means of building support for the opposition; a database of voters was collected and targeted advertising on social media was utilized to swing government supporters vote for the opposition. The NED said that the program was necessary to combat the Venezuelan government's control of the media in Venezuela and that social media was less susceptible to censorship.

The project was first implemented in the 2013 Venezuelan municipal elections and determined to successfully interact with more voters, with the program subsequently being used for the 2015 parliamentary elections. The NDI claimed credit for the opposition's victory in the elections.

== Results ==
The MUD won 109 of the 164 general seats and all three indigenous seats, which gave them a supermajority in the National Assembly, while the GPP won the remaining 55 seats. Voter turnout was just over 74 percent.

The Great Patriotic Pole coalition led by the PSUV received 5,625,248 votes (40.92%) in the party-list vote. A total of 29 parties were members of the coalition, although six of them ran separately in some states.

Party	Party-list			Constituency			Total seats
Party	Votes	%	Seats	Votes	%	Seats	Total seats
Democratic Unity Roundtable	7,728,025	56.21	28	11,407,456	55.85	81	109
United Socialist Party of Venezuela	5,203,487	37.85	23	7,911,444	38.74	32	55
Communist Party of Venezuela	114,343	0.83	0	161,846	0.79	0	0
New Vision for My Country	104,468	0.76	0	146,878	0.72	0	0
Tupamaro	82,188	0.60	0	119,443	0.58	0	0
Red Flag Party	61,700	0.45	0	61,402	0.30	0	0
Fatherland for All	56,199	0.41	0	77,687	0.38	0	0
National Integration Movement–Unity	50,434	0.37	0	74,719	0.37	0	0
Movement for Socialism	37,405	0.27	0	56,720	0.28	0	0
Networks Party	33,663	0.24	0	46,090	0.23	0	0
For Social Democracy	29,647	0.22	0	42,650	0.21	0	0
Independent Solidarity	23,075	0.17	0	26,743	0.13	0	0
Independent Party of Zulia	22,771	0.17	0	22,362	0.11	0	0
Unidad Democracia Renovadora	21,857	0.16	0	28,777	0.14	0	0
People's Electoral Movement	18,678	0.14	0	24,884	0.12	0	0
Venezuelan Popular Unity	16,286	0.12	0	23,397	0.11	0	0
Revolutionary New Path	12,209	0.09	0	18,403	0.09	0	0
Ecological Movement of Venezuela	11,847	0.09	0	10,159	0.05	0	0
Independents for National Community	10,220	0.07	0	14,779	0.07	0	0
Authentic Renewal Organization	7,489	0.05	0	12,960	0.06	0	0
Venezuelan Revolutionary Currents	7,383	0.05	0	10,494	0.05	0	0
Republican Bicentennial Vanguard	7,362	0.05	0	10,478	0.05	0	0
Alliance for Change	7,106	0.05	0	10,384	0.05	0	0
Revolutionary Party of Work	6,303	0.05	0	8,800	0.04	0	0
Democratic Unity	5,924	0.04	0	7,454	0.04	0	0
Organised Youth of Venezuela	5,849	0.04	0	9,022	0.04	0	0
Organized Socialist Party in Venezuela	5,049	0.04	0	6,739	0.03	0	0
Organizados para Gobernar Gente Nueva	4,349	0.03	0	6,355	0.03	0	0
Labour Movement	3,965	0.03	0	5,271	0.03	0	0
Free Voters	3,857	0.03	0	4,959	0.02	0	0
Democratic Republican Union	3,471	0.03	0	4,027	0.02	0	0
Sovereign Unity	3,304	0.02	0	1,659	0.01	0	0
National Opinion	3,274	0.02	0	2,849	0.01	0	0
United Youth in National Action with Bimba	2,737	0.02	0	3,224	0.02	0	0
Movimiento Conciencia de País	2,582	0.02	0	3,657	0.02	0	0
Think Democracy	2,536	0.02	0	3,948	0.02	0	0
United Democratic Party for Peace and Liberty	2,196	0.02	0	3,545	0.02	0	0
Allied Democrats of Free Expression	2,190	0.02	0	3,288	0.02	0	0
Independent People	1,994	0.01	0	2,169	0.01	0	0
New Social Order	1,796	0.01	0	2,020	0.01	0	0
We Continue to Carabobo	1,755	0.01	0	2,855	0.01	0	0
Labour Power	1,562	0.01	0	1,422	0.01	0	0
Workers' Party	1,295	0.01	0	1,922	0.01	0	0
Socialism and Liberty Party	1,229	0.01	0	1,140	0.01	0	0
Intercultural Pluriethnic Movement of Venezuela	1,125	0.01	0	970	0.00	0	0
Venezuelan Independent Will Voters	1,001	0.01	0	977	0.00	0	0
Good Land	882	0.01	0	1,165	0.01	0	0
Renovación en Democracia Nacimiento Alternativo	848	0.01	0	1,604	0.01	0	0
New Majority	727	0.01	0	1,116	0.01	0	0
Independent Movement for the Love of Monagas	712	0.01	0	1,971	0.01	0	0
Revolutionary Socialist Orientation Party	683	0.00	0	604	0.00	0	0
Movement 100	635	0.00	0	1,104	0.01	0	0
Alpha Project	582	0.00	0	1,268	0.01	0	0
Independent Merideños Progressives	531	0.00	0	515	0.00	0	0
People on the Street	525	0.00	0	516	0.00	0	0
United Multi-Ethnic Peoples of Amazonas	516	0.00	0	531	0.00	0	0
New Socialist Generation	495	0.00	0	469	0.00	0	0
People of Vargas	488	0.00	0	1,069	0.01	0	0
Sixth Republic	482	0.00	0	609	0.00	0	0
Socialist Revolutionary Unity	467	0.00	0	640	0.00	0	0
Sucre Awakens Liberation Movement	426	0.00	0	730	0.00	0	0
Socialist Renewal Movement	275	0.00	0	253	0.00	0	0
New Pact	253	0.00	0	149	0.00	0	0
Labor Party Towards Socialism	155	0.00	0	57	0.00	0	0
Organised Independent Party	86	0.00	0	64	0.00	0	0
Revolucionario Independiente Organizado Social	59	0.00	0	59	0.00	0	0
Everyone United for Amazonas	59	0.00	0	36	0.00	0	0
Vanguardia Popular				353	0.00	0	0
Others	379	0.00	0	1,088	0.01	0	0
Indigenous seats							3
Total	13,747,450	100.00	51	20,424,397	100.00	113	167
Valid votes	13,747,450	95.23		13,130,975	90.39		
Invalid/blank votes	688,138	4.77		1,396,519	9.61		
Total votes	14,435,588	100.00		14,527,494	100.00		
Registered voters/turnout	19,496,365	74.04		19,496,365	74.51		
Source: CNE

=== List vote by state ===
States/districts won by the MUD
States/districts won by the GPP

State	MUD		GPP		Others		Margin		State total
State	Votes	%	Votes	%	Votes	%	Votes	%	State total
Capital District	662,926	57.23%	460,871	39.79%	34,443	2.97%	202,055	17.45%	1,158,240
Amazonas	33,069	49.81%	30,868	46.49%	2,447	3.69%	2,201	3.32%	66,384
Anzoátegui	451,973	59.34%	288,789	37.91%	20,890	2.74%	163,184	21.43%	761,652
Apure	93,666	44.79%	110,834	53.00%	4,611	2.21%	−17,168	−8.21%	209,111
Aragua	468,964	54.07%	375,304	43.27%	22,975	2.75%	94,660	10.80%	867,243
Barinas	217,630	55.68%	166,471	42.59%	6,694	1.71%	51,159	13.09%	390,795
Bolívar	387,771	59.57%	242,849	37.30%	20,309	3.12%	144,922	22.26%	650,929
Carabobo	644,642	58.57%	439,195	39.91%	16,619	1.51%	205,447	18.67%	1,100,456
Cojedes	77,395	46.39%	87,585	52.50%	1,826	1.09%	−10,190	−6.11%	166,806
Delta Amacuro	27,087	36.20%	43,813	58.55%	3,922	5.24%	−16,726	−22.35%	74,822
Falcón	252,620	54.14%	196,425	42.10%	17,484	3.75%	56,195	12.05%	466,529
Guárico	168,934	48.35%	175,857	50.33%	4,588	1.31%	−6,923	−1.98%	349,379
Lara	504,122	54.67%	388,685	42.15%	29,184	3.17%	115,437	12.52%	921,991
Mérida	280,251	63.33%	145,585	32.89%	16,676	3.77%	134,666	30.43%	442,512
Miranda	838,292	58.96%	546,718	38.45%	36,762	2.59%	291,574	20.51%	1,421,772
Monagas	227,635	51.55%	201,182	45.56%	12,705	2.88%	26,453	5.99%	441,522
Nueva Esparta	151,122	60.89%	93,365	37.62%	3,692	1.49%	57,757	23.27%	248,179
Portuguesa	186,905	43.96%	228,409	53.72%	9,833	2.31%	−41,504	−9.76%	424,774
Sucre	201,753	49.04%	196,080	47.66%	13,548	3.29%	5,673	1.38%	411,381
Táchira	392,709	65.55%	175,103	29.23%	31,229	5.21%	217,606	36.33%	599,041
Trujillo	180,300	49.48%	168,503	46.25%	15,525	4.26%	11,797	3.24%	364,328
Vargas	99,734	52.27%	85,453	44.78%	5,609	2.94%	14,281	7.48%	190,796
Yaracuy	148,481	48.09%	156,601	50.71%	3,674	1.19%	−8,120	−2.63%	308,756
Zulia	1,030,044	60.24%	620,703	36.30%	58,932	3.45%	409,341	23.94%	1,709,679
Total	7,728,025	56.21%	5,625,248	40.92%	394,177	2.87%	2,102,777	15.30%	13,747,450
Source: CNE

=== Elected representatives ===
N.º	Representative	State	Party
1	Nirma Guarulla	Amazonas	MUD
2	Julio Haron Ygarza	Amazonas	MUD
3	Luis Carlos Padilla	Anzoátegui	MUD
4	Antonio Barreto Sira	Anzoátegui	MUD
5	José Brito	Anzoátegui	MUD
6	Chaim Bucaran	Anzoátegui	MUD
7	Carlos Michelangeli	Anzoátegui	MUD
8	Richard Arteaga	Anzoátegui	MUD
9	Armando Armas	Anzoátegui	MUD
10	Luis Lippa	Apure	MUD
11	Dinorah Figuera	Aragua	MUD
12	Ismael García	Aragua	MUD
13	José Trujillo	Aragua	MUD
14	Amelia Belisario	Aragua	MUD
15	Melva Paredes	Aragua	MUD
16	Karin Salanova	Aragua	MUD
17	Simón Calzadilla	Aragua	MUD
18	Mariela Magallanes	Aragua	MUD
19	Julio César Reyes	Barinas	MUD
20	Freddy Superlano	Barinas	MUD
21	Adolfo Superlano	Barinas	MUD
22	Maribel Guedez	Barinas	MUD
23	Andres Eloy Camejo	Barinas	MUD
24	Ángel Medina	Bolívar	MUD
25	Luis Silva	Bolívar	MUD
26	Olivia Lozano	Bolívar	MUD
27	Francisco Sucre	Bolívar	MUD
28	José Prat	Bolívar	MUD
29	Freddy Valera	Bolívar	MUD
30	Américo de Grazia	Bolívar	MUD
31	Carlos Berrizbeitia	Carabobo	MUD
32	Juan Miguel Matheus	Carabobo	MUD
33	Ylidio de Abreu	Carabobo	MUD
34	Williams Gil	Carabobo	MUD
35	Ángel Álvarez	Carabobo	MUD
36	Marco Bozo	Carabobo	MUD
37	Romny Flores	Carabobo	MUD
38	Carlos Lozano	Carabobo	MUD
39	Dennis Fernández	Cojedes	MUD
40	José Antonio España	Delta Amacuro	MUD
41	Gregorio Graterol	Falcón	MUD
42	Luis Stefanelli	Falcón	MUD
43	Eliezer Sirit	Falcón	MUD
44	Juan Manaure	Falcón	MUD
45	Carlos Prosperi	Guárico	MUD
46	Edgar Zambrano	Lara	MUD
47	María Perez	Lara	MUD
48	Bolivia Suarez	Lara	MUD
49	Luis Florido	Lara	MUD
50	Alfonso Marquina	Lara	MUD
51	Teodoro Campos	Lara	MUD
52	Milagro Valero	Mérida	MUD
53	Alexis Paparoni	Mérida	MUD
54	Addy Valero	Mérida	MUD
55	Williams Davila	Mérida	MUD
56	Carlos Paparoni	Mérida	MUD
57	Julio Borges	Miranda	MUD
58	Luis Moreno	Miranda	MUD
59	Delsa Solórzano	Miranda	MUD
60	Freddy Guevara	Miranda	MUD
61	Miguel Pizarro	Miranda	MUD
62	Adriana D'Elia	Miranda	MUD
63	Rafael Guzmán	Miranda	MUD
64	José Aparicio	Monagas	MUD
65	Pierre Maroun	Monagas	MUD
66	María Hernandez	Monagas	MUD
67	Juan Pablo García	Monagas	MUD
68	Tobias Bolívar	Nueva Esparta	MUD
69	Luis Emilio Rondón	Nueva Esparta	MUD
70	Orlando Avila	Nueva Esparta	MUD
71	Jony Rahal	Nueva Esparta	MUD
72	María Martínez	Portuguesa	MUD
73	Robert Alcalá	Sucre	MUD
74	José Noriega	Sucre	MUD
75	Milagros Paz	Sucre	MUD
76	Ezequiel Pérez	Táchira	MUD
77	Sonia Medina	Táchira	MUD
78	Laidy Gómez	Táchira	MUD
79	Gaby Arellano	Táchira	MUD
80	Juan Requesens	Táchira	MUD
81	Sergio Vergara	Táchira	MUD
82	Carlos Gonzalez	Trujillo	MUD
83	Conrado Pérez	Trujillo	MUD
84	José Olivares	Vargas	MUD
85	Milagros Eulate	Vargas	MUD
86	Juan Guaidó	Vargas	MUD
87	Biagio Pilieri	Yaracuy	MUD
88	Luis Parra	Yaracuy	MUD
89	Enrique Márquez	Zulia	MUD
90	Timoteo Zambrano	Zulia	MUD
91	Omar Barboza	Zulia	MUD
92	Avilio Troconiz	Zulia	MUD
93	Elimar Díaz	Zulia	MUD
94	Nora Bracho	Zulia	MUD
95	Elías Matta	Zulia	MUD
96	Juan Pablo Guanipa	Zulia	MUD
97	William Barrientos	Zulia	MUD
98	José Luis Pirela	Zulia	MUD
99	Hernán Alemán	Zulia	MUD
100	Juan Carlos Velazco	Zulia	MUD
101	Freddy Paz	Zulia	MUD
102	Tomás Guanipa	Distrito Capital	MUD
103	Jesús Abreu	Distrito Capital	MUD
104	Marialbert Barrios	Distrito Capital	MUD
105	Jorge Millan	Distrito Capital	MUD
106	Henry Ramos Allup	Distrito Capital	MUD
107	José Guerra	Distrito Capital	MUD
108	Richard Blanco	Distrito Capital	MUD
109	Stalin González	Distrito Capital	MUD
110	Virgilio Ferrer	Indigenous Representative West Region	MUD
111	Gladys Guaipo	Indigenous Representative East Region	MUD
112	Romel Guzamana	Indigenous Representative South Region	MUD
1	Miguel Tadeo	Amazonas	PSUV
2	Earle Herrera	Anzoátegui	PSUV
3	Cristobal Jiménez	Apure	PSUV
4	Domingo Santana	Apure	PSUV
5	Gerson Vizcaino	Apure	PSUV
6	Héctor Zambrano	Apure	PSUV
7	Ricardo Molina	Aragua	PSUV
8	Asdrúbal Chávez	Barinas	PSUV
9	Héctor Rodríguez	Bolívar	PSUV
10	Saúl Ortega	Carabobo	PSUV
11	Hector Agüero	Carabobo	PSUV
12	Cilia Flores	Cojedes	PSUV
13	Jorge Pérez	Cojedes	PSUV
14	Nosliw Rodríguez	Cojedes	PSUV
15	Pedro Carreño	Delta Amacuro	PSUV
16	Carlos Gómez	Delta Amacuro	PSUV
17	Amado Heredia	Delta Amacuro	PSUV
18	Victor Clark	Falcón	PSUV
19	Jesús Montilla	Falcón	PSUV
20	Óscar Figuera	Guárico	PSUV
21	Christopher Constant	Guárico	PSUV
22	Eustoquio Contreras	Guárico	PSUV
23	Juan Marín	Guárico	PSUV
24	Roger Cordero Lara	Guárico	PSUV
25	Carmen Meléndez	Lara	PSUV
26	Julio Chávez	Lara	PSUV
27	Germán Ferrer	Lara	PSUV
28	Ramón Lobo	Mérida	PSUV
29	Haiman El Troudi	Miranda	PSUV
30	Nora Delgado	Miranda	PSUV
31	Elías Jaua	Miranda	PSUV
32	Genkerve Tovar	Miranda	PSUV
33	Elio Serrano	Miranda	PSUV
34	Diosdado Cabello	Monagas	PSUV
35	Hugo Carvajal	Monagas	PSUV
36	Dinorah Villasmil	Nueva Esparta	PSUV
37	Rafael Calles	Portuguesa	PSUV
38	Mariana Lerin	Portuguesa	PSUV
39	Luis Soteldo	Portuguesa	PSUV
40	Willian Pérez	Portuguesa	PSUV
41	Francisco Torrealba	Portuguesa	PSUV
42	Gilberto Pinto	Sucre	PSUV
43	Edwin Rojas	Sucre	PSUV
44	Rafael Rodríguez	Sucre	PSUV
45	José Sanguino	Táchira	PSUV
46	Hugbel Roa	Trujillo	PSUV
47	Yolmar Gudiño	Trujillo	PSUV
48	Loengri Matheus	Trujillo	PSUV
49	Darío Vivas	Vargas	PSUV
50	Yul Jabour	Yaracuy	PSUV
51	Carlos Gamarra	Yaracuy	PSUV
52	Haydee Huerfano	Yaracuy	PSUV
53	Omar Prieto	Zulia	PSUV
54	Sergio Fuenmayor	Zulia	PSUV
55	Tania Díaz	Distrito Capital	PSUV

== Reactions ==
=== Domestic ===
According to the Associated Press, celebrations and fireworks could be heard in the streets of Caracas following the MUD victory. In a speech following the results, President Maduro acknowledged his party's defeat, saying that, despite these "adverse results", Venezuela's democracy and constitution had triumphed; while calling for peace, re-evaluation, he attributed the opposition's victory to an intensification of the "economic war". A defiant Maduro said he would give no quarter to the Venezuelan opposition in spite of his own party's crushing defeat in last weekend's mid-term parliamentary elections. Maduro vowed to block "the counter-revolutionary right" from taking over the country. "We won't let it," he said. The leader of the MUD, Jesús Torrealba, told supporters after their party's victory that "The country wants change and that change is beginning today". Henrique Capriles Radonski, a leading opposition politician, stated "The results are as we hoped. Venezuela has won. It's irreversible".

=== International ===
Venezuelan bonds grew across the board about one to three cents after the announcement of MUD's victory in the elections, with one researcher at Exotix brokerage stating, "It's better than we expected. Polls suggested a victory but whether that translated into seats was another question. Also, (the government) seem to have accepted the result".

Mauricio Macri, president-elect of Argentina, had announced that he would request to remove Venezuela from Mercosur, as the government was not respecting democratic doctrines. He declined this plan when Maduro acknowledged the defeat of his party. However, a year after the election, on 1 December 2016, Venezuela was suspended from Mercosur.
