= Democratic Unity Roundtable =

Political coalition of Venezuelan opposition parties

Democratic Unity Roundtable Mesa de la Unidad Democrática
- President: Edmundo González
- Secretary-General: Vacant
- Founded: 23 January 2008; 18 years ago (as coalition)
- Registered: 8 June 2012; 14 years ago (as party)
- Dissolved: 24 October 2018; 7 years ago (as coalition)
- Succeeded by: Unitary Platform
- Headquarters: Bello Monte, Caracas
- Ideology: Big tent Liberal democracy Anti-Chavism; Factions: Christian democracy Social democracy Social liberalism Progressivism; Economic liberalism
- Political position: Centre
- Colors: (Venezuelan national colors); Blue (customary)
- Slogan: Para vivir y progresar en paz ('To live and prosper in peace')

Website
- unidadvenezuela.org
- Politics of Venezuela; Political parties; Elections; A: As a coalition, the MUD included both centre-left and centre-right parties.

The Democratic Unity Roundtable (Spanish: Mesa de la Unidad Democrática, MUD) is a Venezuelan political party and former catch-all electoral coalition formed in January 2008. Its primary objective was to unify opposition forces against the government of President Hugo Chávez and the ruling United Socialist Party of Venezuela (PSUV), particularly in preparation for the 2010 parliamentary elections. The coalition succeeded the Coordinadora Democrática, an earlier opposition alliance that dissolved following the failure of the 2004 Venezuelan recall referendum.

The MUD initially brought together parties spanning the center-left to center-right of the political spectrum. Its principal components included Democratic Action and Copei, the two parties that dominated Venezuelan politics between 1959 and 1999. Following the 2013 presidential election, Justice First emerged as the largest opposition party within the coalition, and Henrique Capriles became the leader of the opposition.

In the 2015 parliamentary election, the MUD achieved a major electoral victory, winning 112 of 167 seats in the National Assembly and securing a two-thirds supermajority. This result ended sixteen consecutive years of PSUV control of Venezuela's unicameral legislature. In the 2017 Constituent Assembly election, however, the coalition boycotted the process, and as the National Assembly subsequently lost much of its authority, the PSUV reasserted control over the country's institutions.

Internal fragmentation intensified in subsequent years. In July 2018, Democratic Action announced its withdrawal from the coalition. By October 2018, El País reported that the MUD as a coalition had de facto dissolved itself.

On 31 August 2021, the National Electoral Council (CNE) reinstated the MUD's electoral card, restoring its legal status ahead of the 2021 regional elections. Since then, the MUD has functioned primarily as a formal political party and as the legal electoral vehicle of the Unitary Platform before the CNE.

== Overview ==
The Democratic Unity Roundtable (MUD) was formally launched on 23 January 2008 and underwent organizational restructuring on 8 June 2009. By June 2009, the coalition comprised 11 political parties and was led by Luis Ignacio Planas, then president of Copei. By April 2010, MUD had expanded to include approximately 50 political parties, of which 16 operated at the national level and the remainder at the regional level, along with support from various civil society organizations and opinion groups.

The main parties included in MUD are Democratic Action and Copei, the two parties who dominated Venezuelan politics from 1959 to 1999; the dissenting left-wing parties Movement for Socialism, Radical Cause and Red Flag Party; and more recently established parties Project Venezuela, A New Era, Justice First and For Social Democracy ("PODEMOS").

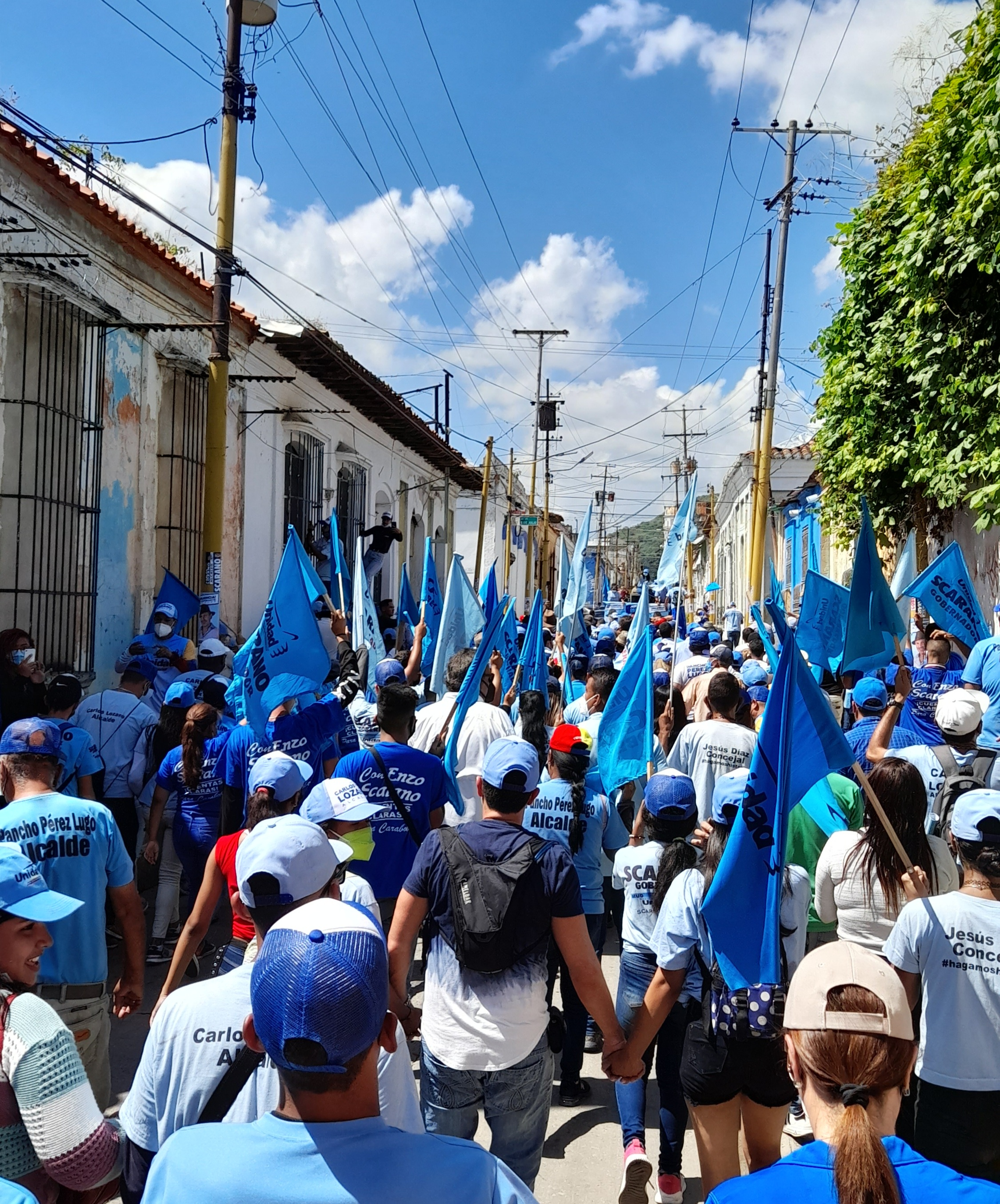
MUD march in Valencia, Carabobo on 6 November 2021.

The coalition brought together a broad range of political forces. Its principal member parties included Democratic Action (Acción Democrática) and Copei, which dominated Venezuelan politics between 1959 and 1999; left-wing parties such as the Movement for Socialism (Movimiento al Socialismo), Radical Cause (La Causa R), and the Red Flag Party (Bandera Roja); and newer political organizations including National Convergence (Convergencia Nacional), Project Venezuela, A New Era (Un Nuevo Tiempo), Justice First (Primero Justicia), For Social Democracy (Podemos) and Progressive Advance (Avanzada Progresista). The MUD also received support from the opposition movement Movimiento 2D, led by El Nacional editor and publisher Miguel Henrique Otero.

On 8 June 2012, the MUD was officially registered as a political party by the National Electoral Council. Prior to obtaining national status, the coalition had been legalized as a political organization in 12 of Venezuela's states. Its subsequent recognition as a national party conferred full legal standing, consistent with Article 67 of the 1999 Constitution, which formally guarantees the right to political association.

Ramón Guillermo Aveledo, a member of Copei, served as the coalition's Executive Secretary from March 2009 until 30 July 2014. He was succeeded by journalist Jesús Torrealba, who held the position from 23 September 2014 until 17 February 2017. Torrealba was later succeeded by José Luis Cartaya, who resigned from the post on 21 December 2024. On 23 August 2021, José Ramón Medina had resigned as President of the Democratic Unity Roundtable alongside Cartaya, who continued on his post.

The MUD articulated shared ideological principles in its National Unity Agreement. These included support for the autonomy of state institutions, political pluralism within a democratic left framework, and the protection of civil liberties such as freedom of expression, association, property, work, and education. The coalition advocated decentralization of power, public security reforms, private property protections, economic freedoms, quality education, job creation, and a more equitable distribution of revenue derived from national oil resources. It also promoted a foreign policy based on regional solidarity and called for institutional reforms aimed at strengthening democracy, including reducing the political influence of the military and reforming electoral legislation.

In September 2012, former Anzoátegui governor David De Lima published a document he claimed revealed internal plans within the MUD to pursue more explicitly neoliberal policies than those stated publicly, allegedly involving agreements among candidates in the coalition's primary elections, including Henrique Capriles. Opposition legislator William Ojeda publicly denounced the alleged plans and criticized what he described as "neoliberal obsessions" within the coalition. He was suspended by his party, Un Nuevo Tiempo, the following day. One minor coalition party accused De Lima of offering financial incentives to withdraw from the MUD, an allegation he denied.

On 25 January 2018, the Supreme Tribunal of Justice, presided over by Maikel Moreno, issued a ruling through its Constitutional Chamber ordering the National Electoral Council to exclude the Democratic Unity Roundtable from the renewal process for existing political parties. As a result, the ruling directed the cancellation of the party's registration and its dissolution, thereby preventing it from participating in the 2018 presidential election. This decision was later overturned by the CNE. However, on 21 February, its leadership announced it would boycott the elections, calling them a "fraudulent and illegitimate simulation."

On 31 August 2021, the National Electoral Council reinstated the MUD as a nationally registered political party, restoring its legal status and electoral card.

Although the MUD ceased to operate as a unified coalition by 2021 and was succeeded politically by the Unitary Platform, it retained legal registration as a political party. This status allowed it to preserve its electoral card (tarjeta electoral), which became a key mechanism for opposition participation in subsequent elections. Despite judicial interventions affecting several former member parties and the reassignment of their electoral cards to leaderships appointed by the Supreme Tribunal of Justice, the MUD card remained intact. As a result, it served as the formal electoral vehicle for the opposition in the 2021 regional elections and the 2024 presidential election, as the Unitary Platform itself lacks independent legal registration before the National Electoral Council.

The MUD electoral card was not used in the 2025 parliamentary election. The Unitary Platform, which had been using the card as its legal electoral vehicle, boycotted the election in protest over alleged irregularities in the 2024 presidential election and stated that it would not participate in further electoral processes until its demands regarding the recognition of results were addressed. PSUV deputy Francisco Ameliach stated that, regardless of the boycott, the MUD electoral card was ineligible for use because the party had not participated in the 2020 parliamentary election and therefore failed to meet the 1% vote threshold required by electoral law to maintain registration. However, the MUD did not participate in the 2020 election because its electoral card had been suspended at the time, preventing its use regardless of electoral participation.

== 2010 parliamentary election ==
In April 2010, the Democratic Unity Roundtable held primary elections in 15 electoral districts. Approximately 361,000 voters participated, selecting 22 candidates, while the remaining 143 candidates were chosen "by consensus" among coalition members. Among those selected were María Corina Machado, associated with the civil organization Súmate, and Iván Simonovis, a former police official who at the time was imprisoned in connection with the events surrounding the 2002 Venezuelan coup attempt. Several other detainees whom the MUD regarded as political prisoners were also nominated in competitive districts; their election would have required their release due to parliamentary immunity. Manuel Rosales, the opposition's candidate in the 2006 presidential election, was likewise nominated while living in exile in Peru, where he faced corruption charges that he denied.

In the September 2010 elections to the National Assembly, the MUD obtained approximately 47% of the national vote but secured only 64 of the 165 seats. This disparity was widely attributed to changes in electoral districting and seat allocation approved by the outgoing National Assembly, which was dominated by the ruling party. In contrast, the United Socialist Party of Venezuela (PSUV) won about 48% of the vote and obtained 98 seats, while the Patria Para Todos (PPT) party won two seats. Prominent opposition figures elected as deputies included María Corina Machado and Enrique Mendoza.

== 2012 presidential election ==
The MUD held an open primary election on 12 February 2012. Henrique Capriles Radonski won the opposition primaries with 1,900,528 (64.2%) votes of the 3,059,024 votes cast (votes abroad not included). The other candidates on the 12 February 2012 primary ballot were:

- Pablo Pérez Álvarez: governor of Zulia state, representing the A New Era party; received 30.3% of the vote.
- María Corina Machado: former Súmate president and member of the National Assembly of Venezuela representing the Miranda state since 2011; received 3.7% of the vote.
- Diego Arria: former Venezuelan representative to the United Nations (1990–91) and former governor of the defunct Federal District (1974–78); received 1.3% of the vote.
- Pablo Medina: politician and former trade union leader, supported by the trade unions; received 0.5% of the vote.

== 2015 parliamentary election ==
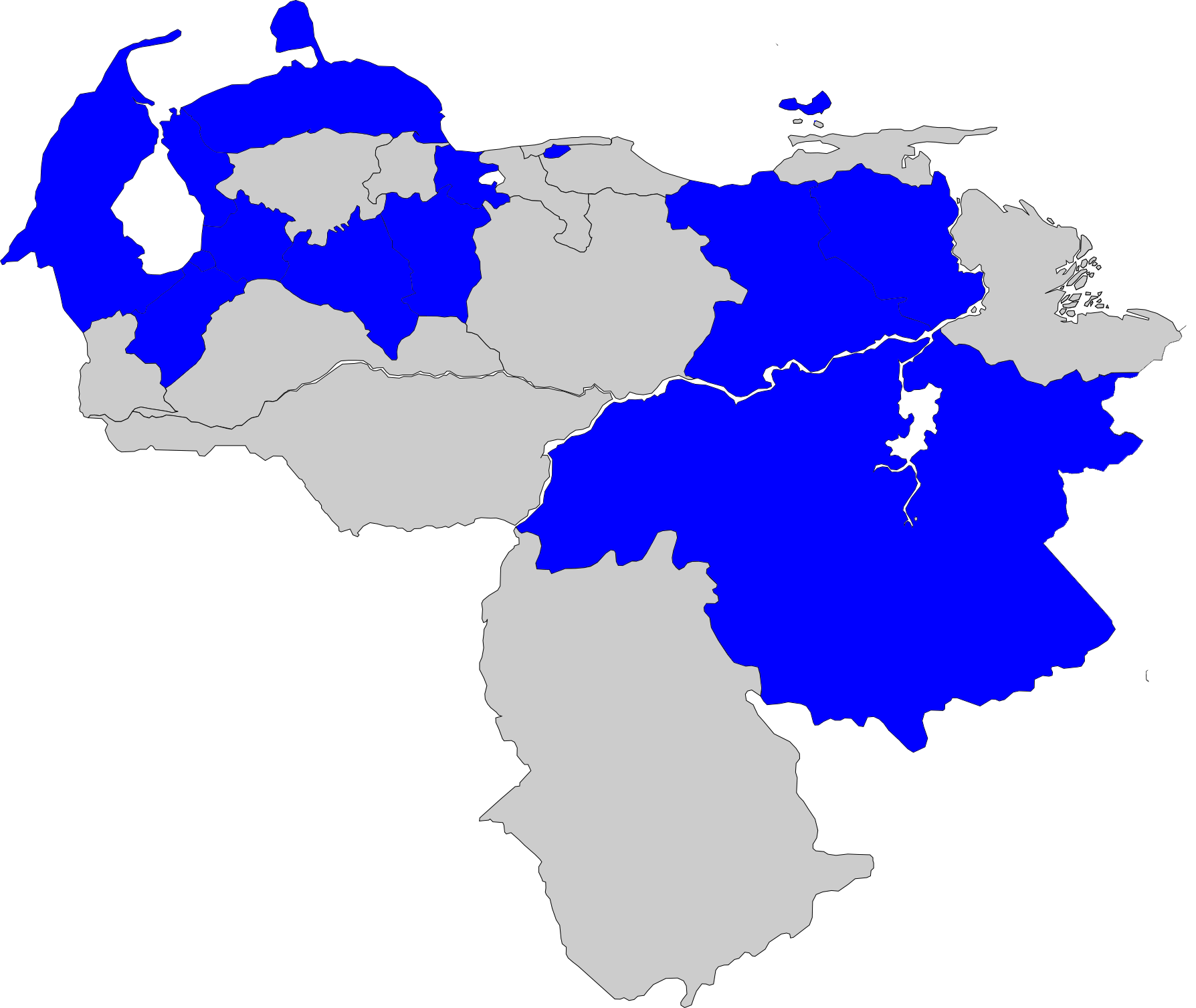
States (in blue) where the MUD held primaries ahead of the 2015 parliamentary election.

For the 2015 parliamentary election, the political parties that composed the Democratic Unity Roundtable agreed not to register candidates individually. Instead, they jointly nominated candidates under the MUD electoral card, presenting a unified slate on behalf of all member parties, following the model previously used in the 2013 presidential election. The approach was intended to maximize electoral cohesion and avoid vote fragmentation among opposition forces.

In 11 states and the Capital District, the coalition organized primary elections on 17 May 2015 to select candidates in 33 constituencies from among its member parties. Justice First emerged as the largest force within the coalition during the primaries, receiving 19.7% of the votes cast and securing 12 of the 40 candidacies contested.

The unified electoral strategy proved successful. In December 2015, the MUD won 112 of the 167 seats in the National Assembly, securing a two-thirds supermajority. Voter turnout reached approximately 74% of registered voters, representing the highest participation rate in a Venezuelan legislative election since the start of the Bolivarian Revolution.

== Member parties (2015) ==
The following is a list of political parties which formed the MUD coalition and participated at the time of the 2015 parliamentary election:

Party name	Logo	Acronym	Leader	Main ideology	Seats in the IV National Assembly	International Associations
Justice First; Primero Justicia		PJ	Henrique Capriles Radonski	Humanism; Economic liberalism	33 / 167	None
Democratic Action; Acción Democrática		AD	Henry Ramos Allup	Social democracy Left-wing nationalism	25 / 167	Socialist International
A New Era; Un Nuevo Tiempo		UNT	Manuel Rosales	Social democracy	18 / 167	Socialist International
Popular Will; Voluntad Popular		VP	Leopoldo López	Progressivism; Social democracy	14 / 167	Socialist International
Radical Cause; La Causa Radical		LCR	Andrés Velásquez	Labourism; Radical democracy	4 / 167	None
Progressive Movement of Venezuela; Movimiento Progresista de Venezuela		MPV	Simón Calzadilla	Progressivism; Social democracy	4 / 167	None
Project Venezuela; Proyecto Venezuela		PRVZL	Henrique Salas Feo	Liberal conservatism Christian democracy	2 / 167	IDU, UPLA
Clear Accounts; Cuentas Claras		CC	Vicencio Scarano	Progressivism	2 / 167	None
Progressive Advance; Avanzada Progresista		AP	Henri Falcón	Progressivism; Social democracy	2 / 167	None
Independent Political Electoral Organization Committee; Comité de Organización Política Electoral Independiente		COPEI	Roberto Enríquez	Social conservatism Christian democracy Economic liberalism	1 / 167	Centrist Democrat International
Fearless People's Alliance; Alianza Bravo Pueblo		ABP	Antonio Ledezma	Social democracy	1 / 167	None
Emergent People; Gente Emergente		GE	Julio César Reyes	Christian democracy Christian humanism	1 / 167	None
Come Venezuela; Vente Venezuela		VENTE	María Corina Machado	Liberalism	1 / 167	Liberal International (observer)
National Convergence; Convergencia Nacional		CN	Juan José Caldera	Christian democracy Economic liberalism Christian humanism	0 / 167	ODCA (observer)
Movement for a Responsible, Sustainable and Entrepreneurial Venezuela; Movimiento por una Venezuela Responsable, Sostenible y Emprendedora		MOVERSE	Alexis Romero	Green politics Progressivism	0 / 167	None
Liberal Force; Fuerza Liberal		FL	Haydée Deutsch	Liberal conservatism Economic liberalism	0 / 167	Liberal International (observer)

=== Former member parties ===
In June 2012, the Supreme Tribunal of Justice intervened the parties Fatherland for All (Patria Para Todos) and For Social Democracy (Podemos), replacing their elected leadership with court-appointed, pro-government authorities. The new leadership subsequently withdrew both parties from the Democratic Unity Roundtable.

The communist Red Flag Party (Bandera Roja) was previously a member of the MUD and supported opposition candidate Henrique Capriles in the 2012 presidential election. It later withdrew from the coalition in September 2014, citing strategic and political differences with the coalition's objectives.

In January 2015, the Movement for Socialism withdrew from the MUD, citing internal contradictions among the coalition's member parties and a lack of unity. The party also rejected proposals to boycott the 2015 parliamentary election. Ahead of the election, the Ecological Movement of Venezuela, OPINA, Labour Movement, and the Democratic Republican Union also left the MUD, fielding their own lists of parliamentary candidates.

In July 2015, the Republican Movement, led by Leonardo Mendoza Lira, announced that it would contest the election using its own electoral card. Mendoza stated that the decision stemmed from the group's exclusion from the candidate nomination process for the 2015 elections, both on party lists and in nominal constituencies.

The Christian democratic party Copei, a founding member of the MUD, did not participate in the coalition during the 2015 parliamentary election.

In August 2017, Vente Venezuela, led by María Corina Machado, exited the MUD following disagreements over whether to participate in the 2017 regional elections.

In November 2017, the Fearless People's Alliance, led by former Caracas mayor Antonio Ledezma, withdrew from the MUD's parliamentary caucus to form an independent bloc. The alliance cited a lack of coherence within the coalition and expressed dissatisfaction with what it described as the MUD's limited tangible progress.

In March 2018, Progressive Advance, the political party founded by Henri Falcón, withdrew from the MUD. Party leader Luis Augusto Romero stated that the withdrawal reflected the coalition's diminished activity, remarking that it was difficult to be expelled from an organization that was no longer functioning.

In July 2018, the social democratic party Democratic Action, one of the largest and historically most influential members of the coalition, announced its withdrawal from the MUD.

In November 2018, Radical Cause, led by Andrés Velásquez, withdrew from the MUD. Party leaders cited growing dissatisfaction with the coalition's internal dynamics, particularly the functioning of the opposition bloc within the National Assembly. Velásquez characterized the coalition as disorganized.

== Electoral results ==
=== Presidential elections ===
Election year	Name	# of overall votes	% of overall vote
2012	Henrique Capriles	6,591,304	44.31 (#2)
2012	Member of Justice First party in coalition. Lost.		
2013	Henrique Capriles	7,363,980	49.12 (#2)
2013	Member of Justice First party in coalition. Lost.		
2024	Edmundo González	7,443,584 (Note: Results per the Comando Con Venezuela, collected and published from 85.2% of vote tallies.)	68.74 (#1)
2024	Independent member in coalition. Disputed. (see)		

=== Parliamentary elections ===
Election year	# of overall votes	% of overall vote	# of overall seats won	+/–	Leader
2010	5,334,309 (#2)	47.2%	67 / 165	–	Ramón Guillermo Aveledo
2015	7,707,422 (#1)	56.3%	112 / 167	▲45	Jesús Torrealba

=== Gubernatorial elections ===
Election year	# of overall votes	% of overall vote	# of overall states won	+/–
2012	3,883,037 (#2)	44.8%	3 / 23	–
2017	4,984,830 (#2)	45.1%	5 / 23	▲2
2021	2,255,740 (#2)	25.2%	3 / 23	▼2

== See also ==
- Coordinadora Democrática
- Great Patriotic Pole — political coalition led by President Nicolás Maduro
