= Central University of Venezuela rectorate takeover =

2001 University takeover in Venezuela

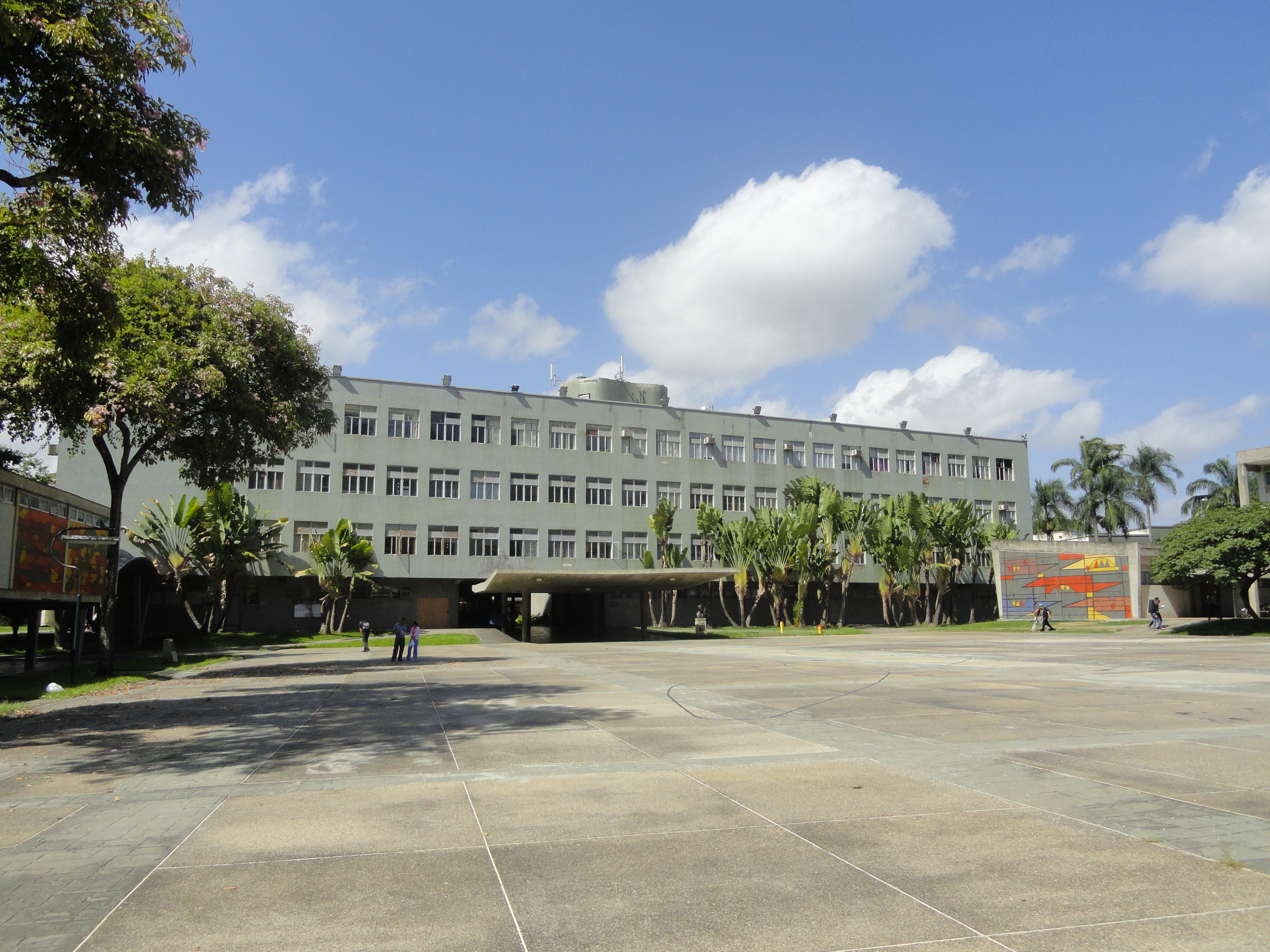
- The university's rectorate, the building seized by the occupiers
- Date: 28 March-3 May 2001 (36 days)
- Location: Central University of Venezuela, Caracas, Venezuela
- Goals: Convene a "university constituent".
- Methods: Occupation
- Result: University rectorate seized by left-leaning students; Suspension of classes; Occupiers forcibly expelled by students and sanctioned by the university

The Central University of Venezuela rectorate takeover was an action carried out on 28 March 2001 by a group of left-leaning university students who violently took over the facilities, demanding a "university constituent assembly".

The seizure began after a group of students, after an assembly was called in the Aula Magna, went to the University Council meeting room, threw tear gas canisters and beat up both security guards and professors. The events caused the suspension of classes at the university. The occupation lasted for 36 days, during which the violence escalated until 3 May, when the student community decided to respond to the classes suspension and expelled the occupiers by force from the rector's office.

== Background ==
Giuseppe Giannetto served as Vice Rector of the Central University of Venezuela (UCV) between 1996 and 2000 during the tenure of Trino Alcides Díaz, Despite their ideological differences, given that Trino was a government supporter, the two maintained excellent relations. Alcides Díaz later served as director of SUDEBAN, SENIAT and as Venezuela's ambassador to Mexico. In the rectorate elections Giannetto overwhelmingly defeated Nelson Merentes, President Hugo Chávez's and Trino's candidate, and was elected to the position in 2000.

During his tenure, Giannetto appointed Héctor Navarro as postgraduate director and Nelson Merentes as coordinator of the scientific development council, the two most important academic positions after the deans. The rector maintained good relations with the government, and the articulation between the executive and the university authorities managed to return the Caracas Botanical Garden and the Rental Zone to university's control. Additionally, the UNESCO officially inscribed the University City of Caracas on the list of World Heritage Sites on 2 December 2000.

Beyond the usual student claims within the university, there was a climate of normality in the university space, with some exceptions. In January 2001, the Olympic Stadium of the UCV was taken over by the same group that a few months later took over the university's rector's office to prevent the Caracas Pop Festival from being held and to reject "the privatization of university spaces". Fernando Rivero, one of the participants in the takeover of the rectorate, by then an eighth semester student of Philosophy and third year law student and later a member of the 2017 Constituent National Assembly of Venezuela, told El Estímulo that the position was one of the main demands of the movement.

== Takeover ==
On the morning of 28 March 2001, a group of students from different faculties and schools of the university called an assembly in the Aula Magna, which was joined by some members of the labor union and professors. At the same time, in the meeting room of the University Council (UC), the debate between the authorities and student representatives was taking place normally. At one point, those present were notified of the events in the Aula Magna and that they could go all the way to the University Council. A group of professors, including Luis Fuenmayor (who was close to the government), was appointed to dialogue with the students in company of the campus security guards in response to the violent attitude taken by the group.

When the students arrived from the Aula Magna, among whom the occupiers assume the action as "an act of cowardice" on the part of the rector, the professors came out to try to mediate with them, telling them that they were discussing in the board of directors and that they were about to be received. According to Gianetto, the student group that stormed the session room numbered around 100 people. The students threw tear gas canisters and beat both security guards and teachers, who took refuge in the meeting room. Gianetto suspended the University Council in response to the violence and withdrew to his office. By the end of the afternoon, the violent atmosphere was reinforced with the arrival of other groups sympathetic to the Bolivarian revolution. According to the rector, from his office he heard numerous detonations.

In an interview, Rector Gianetto says that around 7 p.m. he was approached by a security guard that informed that professor Agustín Blanco Muñoz was outside, the only professor who had broken into the session hall, and that he had "[ensured] his physical integrity" if he left the rectorate "because he [was] the new rector." Gianetto responded:

Look, Sergio, tell him and the others that I leave here with my head held high or feet first, but the rector's office is not surrendered.

Along with professor Elizabeth Marval, university secretary, and Margara Rincón, director of human resources, Gianetto decided to barricade themselves in the rector's office, where they remained for five days. The students took over the facilities demanding a "university constituent assembly". Academic activities were suspended on the university campus and rumors about the possible intervention of the university started circulating.

President Hugo Chávez, although he did not dismiss the objectives of the occupiers, did not directly support them either. According to Gianetto, the Minister of the Secretariat of the Presidency Elías Jaua had called him to assure him that the government did not support the events. As the rectorate takeover progressed, a court filed an injunction and gave the order for the Armed Forces to evacuate the university. The government interceded and appointed Attorney General Isaías Rodríguez as mediator of the conflict. There was not a unified position within Chavismo regarding the takeover. The most radical, among whom the rector highlighted Adina Bastidas, Eliécer Otaiza, Iris Varela and Freddy Bernal, fervently defended the occupiers, while the more moderate currents remained neutral.

== Aftermath ==
The student community reacted negatively against the occupiers for the classes suspension and weeks later, on 3 May, they decided to expel them. Gianetto says that the students stormed the University Council meeting room, breaking the glass access door of the rector's building because the occupiers had chained it shut, climbing into the meeting room and beginning to forcibly remove the occupiers. A large group of students formed a human corridor through which pushed them out of the building.

After the rectorate takeover, the opening of an academic record was requested and an instructor was appointed to conduct an investigation of the events. Professors and students who witnessed the events testified against those involved. Fernando Rivero was expelled for five years from the university for his participation in the takeover, when he was only two semesters away from graduating from the Philosophy School. Among those expelled, but with an administrative record, was the general secretary of the Association of Administrative Employees of the UCV, Eduardo Sánchez. The only participant who was not sanctioned was Professor Agustín Blanco Muñoz.

== Legacy ==
The seizure of the rector's office would give rise to the M-28 movement, a Chavista movement at the Central University. The rectorate takeover was one of the most violent episodes at the university since the 1984 Tazón massacre, when National Guard soldiers shot and wounded at least 35 students, although none of them died.

== See also ==
- Autonomous university
- Operación Canguro
- Tazón massacre
