= Diosdado Cabello =

Venezuelan politician (born 1963)

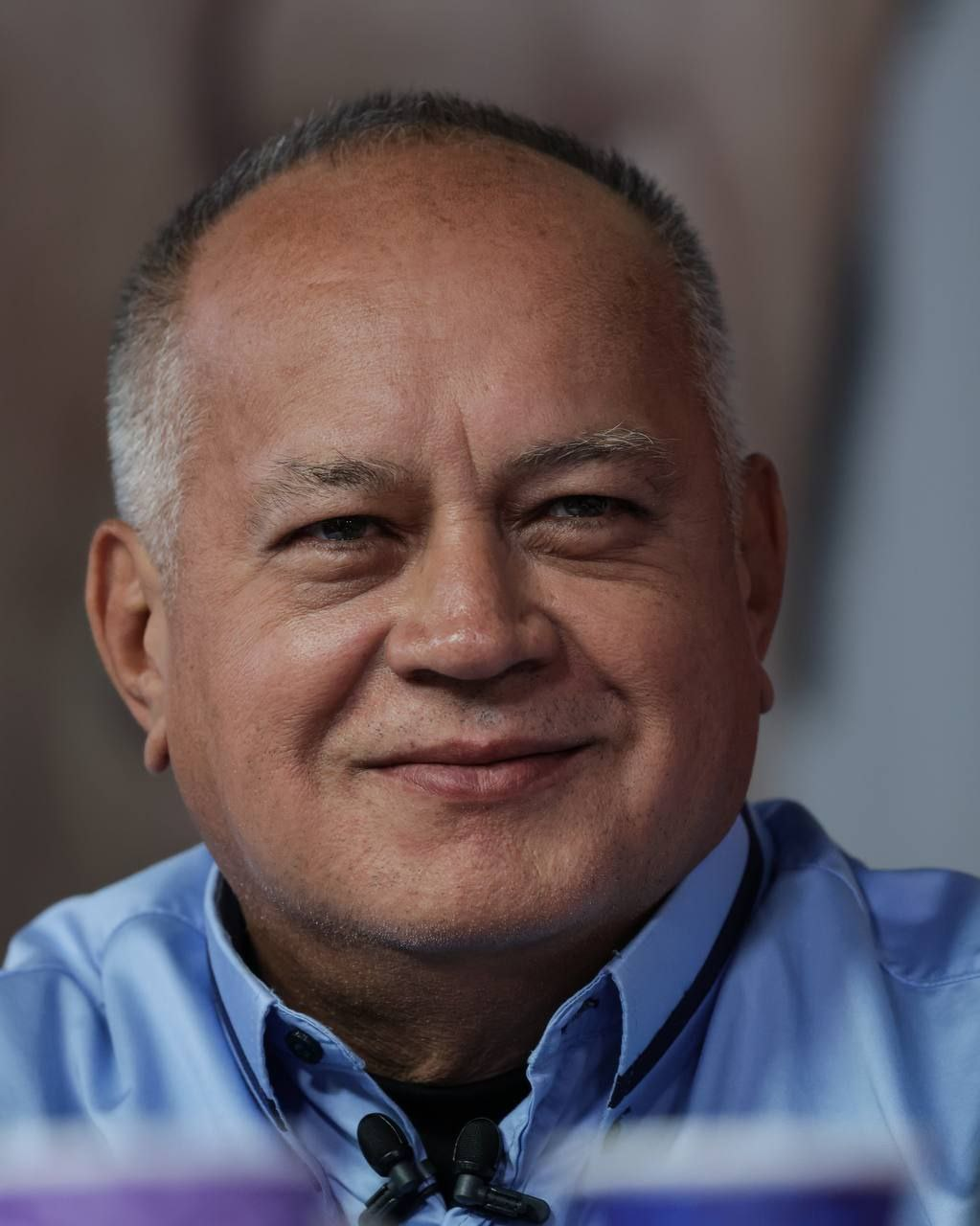
- Cabello in 2025

Acting President of Venezuela
- In office 13 April 2002 – 14 April 2002
- Vice President: Himself
- Preceded by: Pedro Carmona (acting)
- Succeeded by: Hugo Chávez

Minister of Interior, Justice and Peace
- Incumbent
- Assumed office 27 August 2024
- President: Nicolás Maduro; Delcy Rodríguez (acting)
- Preceded by: Remigio Ceballos
- In office 28 April 2002 – 10 January 2003
- President: Hugo Chávez
- Preceded by: Ramón Rodríguez Chacín
- Succeeded by: Lucas Rincón Romero

President of the Constituent National Assembly
- In office 19 June 2018 – 18 December 2020
- President: Nicolás Maduro
- Preceded by: Delcy Rodríguez
- Succeeded by: Position abolished

Secretary-General of the United Socialist Party of Venezuela
- Incumbent
- Assumed office 11 December 2011
- Preceded by: Position established

Vice President of Venezuela
- In office 13 January 2002 – 28 April 2002
- President: Hugo Chávez: Pedro Carmona (acting) Himself (acting) Hugo Chávez
- Preceded by: Adina Bastidas
- Succeeded by: José Vicente Rangel

6th President of the National Assembly
- In office 5 January 2012 – 5 January 2016
- President: Hugo Chávez; Nicolás Maduro
- Preceded by: Fernando Soto Rojas
- Succeeded by: Henry Ramos Allup
Ministerial positions
Minister of Public Works and Housing
In office 4 March 2009 – 24 June 2010
President	Hugo Chávez
Preceded by	Isidro Rondón (Infrastructure); Francisco Sesto (Housing and Habitat)
Succeeded by	Ricardo Molina (Housing and Habitat)
Minister of Infrastructure
In office 15 January 2003 – 28 April 2004
President	Hugo Chávez
Preceded by	Ismael Hurtado
Succeeded by	Ramón Carrizales

Deputy of the National Assembly of Venezuela
- In office 5 January 2011 – 27 August 2024
- Constituency: Monagas State (2011-2021); National List (2021-2024)

Governor of Miranda
- In office 31 October 2004 – 29 November 2008
- Preceded by: Enrique Mendoza
- Succeeded by: Henrique Capriles

Personal details
- Born: Diosdado Cabello Rondón; 15 April 1963 (age 63) El Furrial, Monagas, Venezuela
- Party: PSUV (2008–present)
- Other political affiliations: Fifth Republic Movement (MVR) (1997–2008)
- Spouse: Marleny Contreras
- Children: 4 included (Daniella)
- Relatives: José David Cabello (brother); Glenna Cabello (sister)
- Profession: Engineer

Diosdado Cabello Rondón (Spanish: [djozˈðaðo kaˈβeʝo ronˈdon]; born 15 April 1963) is a Venezuelan politician, former military officer, and alleged drug lord who has served as Minister of Interior, Justice and Peace since 2024. Cabello is a former member of the National Assembly of Venezuela, where he previously served as Speaker. Cabello played a key role in Hugo Chávez's return to power following the 2002 Venezuelan coup d'état attempt. He was Governor of Miranda state from 2004 to 2008, he lost the 2008 election to prominent opposition leader Henrique Capriles Radonski and was subsequently appointed Public Works & Housing Minister. In November 2009, he was additionally appointed head of the National Commission of Telecommunications, a position traditionally independent from the Ministry of Public Works and Housing. In 2010, he was elected a member of parliament by his home state of Monagas. In 2012, he was elected and sworn in as President of the National Assembly of Venezuela, the country's parliament. He was elected president of the National Assembly each year until 2016. He was the second and last president of the 2017 National Constituent Assembly.

Cabello has been accused by Venezuelan defectors and pro-opposition media, and the United States of leading the Cartel of the Suns, using nepotism to reward friends and family members, and directing colectivos while paying them with funds from Petróleos de Venezuela. In 2013, there were at least 17 formal corruption allegations lodged against Cabello in Venezuela's prosecutors office, and from 2016 to 2017, Cabello allegedly received more than $150 million in bribes, and misused more than $230 million. Central Bank of Venezuela was reported that Cabello had a German bank account of $250 million. In 2015, convicted drug traffickers and nephews of Cilia Flores, Efraín Antonio Campos Flores and Francisco Flores de Freitas stated they received orders from Cabello and Tareck El Assami, who was also later convicted and imprisoned. On 26 March 2020, the U.S. Department of State offered $10 million for information leading to his arrest or conviction by the US in relation to drug trafficking and narco-terrorism. In 2025, DEA announced a new $25 million reward for Cabello's capture as he was indicted for drug trafficking and narcoterrorism.

Cabello was described in 2013 as the second most powerful man in Venezuela. Reuters wrote in 2012 that he possessed significant "sway with the military and lawmakers plus close links to businessmen".

== Early life and education ==
Diosdado Cabello was born in El Furrial, in the state of Monagas. In 1987, he graduated second in his class from the Venezuelan Military Academy. His measured intelligence quotient (IQ) was ranked as the fifth-highest among all students in the institution's history. His background is in engineering. He has an undergraduate degree in systems engineering from the Instituto Universitario Politécnico de las Fuerzas Armadas Nacionales and a graduate degree in engineering project management from the Andrés Bello Catholic University.

== Military career ==
While at Instituto Universitario Politécnico de las Fuerzas Armadas Nacionales, Cabello befriended Hugo Chávez and they played on the same baseball team. During Chávez’s abortive coup d'état of February 1992 against the government of then-President Carlos Andrés Pérez, Cabello led a group of four tanks to attack Miraflores Palace. Cabello was jailed for his participation in the coup, though President Rafael Caldera later pardoned him with the rest of the coup participants and Cabello was released after only two years without any charges.

== Political career ==
After Chávez was released from jail in 1994, Cabello helped him run his political campaign as he was a prominent member of the Fifth Republic Movement Chávez was leading. Following Chávez's 1998 electoral victory, he helped set up the pro-Chávez grassroots civil society organizations known as "Bolivarian Circles" which have been compared to Cuba's Committees for the Defence of the Revolution and are parent organizations for the Colectivos.

From 1999 to 2000, Cabello was head of the national telecommunications commission (CONATEL). The main telecommunications law he helped promulgate, known as the "Organic Telecommunications Law" (2000), was especially praised by the private sector. Specifically, it ended the state's prior monopoly on the industry and fostered a significant level of free-market competition, as Cabello's work helped increase the treasury's revenue by $400 million at a time when oil prices were not especially high.

In May 2001, he became Chavez' chief of staff, and was appointed Secretary-General by President Hugo Chávez on 13 January 2002, replacing Adina Bastidas. As such, he was responsible to both the president and the National Assembly, and for the relations between the executive and legislative branches of the government. On 13 April 2002, he took on the duties of the presidency on a temporary basis, replacing Pedro Carmona, head of the Venezuelan Chamber of Commerce, as interim president during the coup d'état attempt when Chávez was kept prisoner and was consequently absent from office.

Upon taking office, Cabello said that "I, Diosdado Cabello, am assuming the presidency until such time as the president of the republic, Hugo Chávez Frías, appears." A few hours later, Chávez was back in office. On 28 April 2002, Cabello was replaced as Vice President by José Vicente Rangel. Cabello was named interior minister in May 2002, and then infrastructure minister in January 2003.

Miranda State Governor Election, 2008 Results
Candidates	Votes	%
Henrique Capriles Radonski	583.795	53,11%
Diosdado Cabello	506.753	46,10%
Source: CNE data

In October 2004, Cabello was elected to a four-year term as Governor of Miranda State. He lost the 2008 election to Henrique Capriles Radonski, and was subsequently appointed Public Works & Housing Minister. In 2009, he was additionally appointed head of Conatel. On 1 August 2009, 32 radio and 2 television stations were intervened, decision ordered by Cabello. The measure was received as an act of censorship by several non-governmental and international organizations.

On 11 December 2011, Cabello was installed as the Vice-President of the United Socialist Party (PSUV), thus becoming the second most powerful figure in the party after Hugo Chávez. Cabello was appointed president of the National Assembly in early 2012 and was re-elected to that post in January 2013. Cabello's status after the death of Hugo Chávez was disputed. Some argue that Cabello was constitutionally required to be the acting President, but Nicolás Maduro held the position. Often described as the second most powerful man in Venezuela, Reuters notes that Cabello possesses significant "sway with the military and lawmakers plus close links to businessmen." Despite serving as the leader of Chavez' party, his overall reputation is that of a pragmatist rather than an ideologue.

== Television program ==
Cabello has his own weekly program on Venezolana de Televisión, Con el Mazo Dando (Going at it with the Club). In that program, Cabello talks about the government's view on many political issues and presents accusations against the opposition. The Inter-American Commission on Human Rights (IACHR) has expressed concerns about how the program has intimidated people that went to the IACHR denouncing the government.

Some Venezuelan commentators have compared the use of illegally recorded private conversations on programs such as Cabello's to the practices in place in the East Germany as shown in the film The Life of Others. Amnesty International has denounced the way in which Cabello has revealed details on the travel arrangements of two human rights defenders in his program and how he routinely shows state monitoring of people that may disagree with the government.

== Personal life ==
His wife, Marleny Contreras, was elected as a member of the National Assembly until she became minister of tourism in 2015. Cabello’s sister, Glenna, is a political scientist and was Counsellor of the Venezuelan Permanent Mission to the United Nations. His brother, José David, previously minister of infrastructure, is in charge of the nation’s taxes as head of SENIAT, Venezuela’s revenue service. His daughter, Daniella Cabello was appointed Venezuelan tourism minister in 2026.

== Controversies ==
Cabello was nicknamed "the octopus" by Rory Carroll for having "tentacles everywhere." He is very influential in the Venezuelan government, using a network of patronage throughout the military, ministries and pro-government militias. He was described by a contributor to The Atlantic as the "Frank Underwood" of Venezuela under whose watch the National Assembly of Venezuela has made a habit of ignoring constitutional hurdles entirely—at various times preventing opposition members from speaking in session, suspending their salaries, stripping particularly problematic legislators of parliamentary immunity, and, on one occasion, even presiding over the physical beating of unfriendly lawmakers while the assembly was meeting.

Information presented to the United States State Department by Stratfor claimed that Cabello was "head of one of the major centers of corruption in Venezuela." A leaked U.S. Embassy cable from 2009 characterized Cabello as a "major pole" of corruption within the regime, describing him as "amassing great power and control over the regime’s apparatus as well as a private fortune, often through intimidation behind the scenes". The communiqué likewise created speculation that "Chavez himself might be concerned about Cabello's growing influence but unable to diminish it."

=== Drug trafficking ===
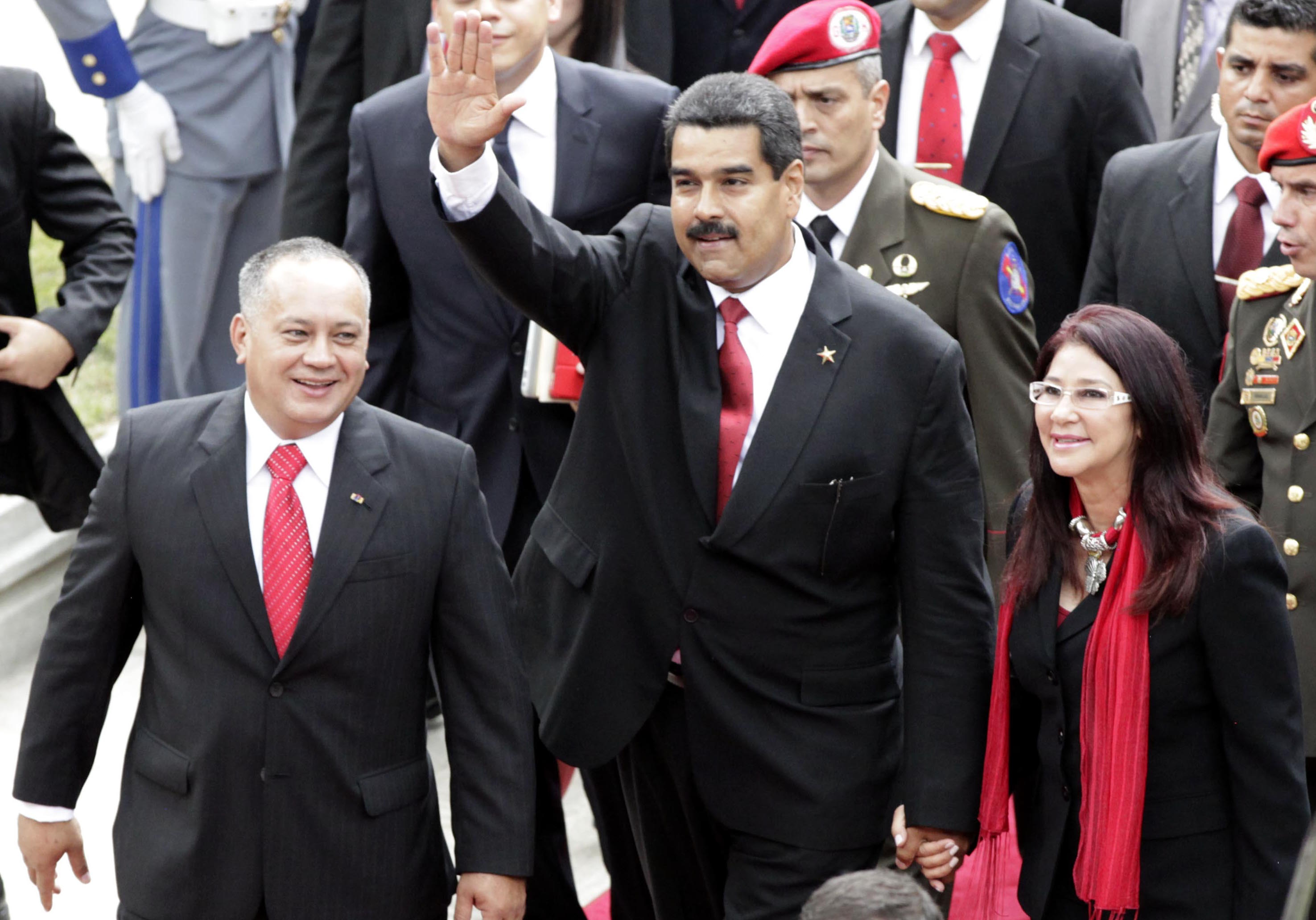
Diosdado Cabello with Maduro and Cilia Flores in 2013

Cabello has been accused, by defector Leamsy Salazar, of being a leading figure in an international drug trafficking organization, of using nepotism to reward friends and family members by the Atlantic and of directing colectivos while paying them with funds from Petróleos de Venezuela by opposition media in Venezuela. In 2013, there were at least 17 formal corruption allegations lodged against Cabello in Venezuela's prosecutors office.

On 27 January 2015, reports accusing Cabello of drug trafficking emerged. In a series of investigations by the United States government, it was stated that Cabello's alleged involvement in the drug trade as the "capo" [sic] (head) of the Cartel of the Suns (Spanish Cartel de los soles), had also involved high-ranking generals of Venezuelan military. On 26 March 2020, the U.S. Department of State offered $10 million for information leading to his arrest or conviction by the US in relation to drug trafficking and narco-terrorism.

=== Assassination plot targeting Marco Rubio ===
In mid-July 2017, reporters in Washington, D.C., observed an increased security presence surrounding Senator Marco Rubio. On 13 August 2017, The Miami Herald reported that a US Department of Homeland Security memo alleged that Cabello may have initiated an assassination plot targeting Rubio, and may have contacted "unspecified Mexican nationals" to discuss killing Rubio. Cabello is a strong critic of Rubio, whom he dubbed "Narco Rubio". Rubio, who is a critic of the Venezuelan government, has led an effort in the United States government to take action against officials of the Latin American government, often singling out Cabello. The Department of Homeland Security could not verify the details involved in the threat, but took it seriously enough to contact multiple law enforcement agencies about the incident and Rubio's security detail had increased in size.

=== Sanctions ===
Cabello has been sanctioned by several countries and is banned from entering neighboring Colombia. The Colombian government maintains a list of people banned from entering Colombia or subject to expulsion; as of January 2019, the list had 200 people with a "close relationship and support for the Nicolás Maduro regime".

==== Argentina ====
In September 2024, a federal court in Buenos Aires issued an arrest warrant against Cabello and several other Venezuelan officials for crimes against humanity.

==== Canada ====
Canada sanctioned 40 Venezuelan officials, including Cabello, in September 2017. The sanctions were for behaviors that undermined democracy after at least 125 people were killed in the 2017 Venezuelan protests and "in response to the government of Venezuela's deepening descent into dictatorship". Canadians were banned from transactions with the 40 individuals, whose Canadian assets were frozen. The sanctions noted a rupture of Venezuela's constitutional order.

==== European Union ====
The European Union sanctioned Cabello and six other Venezuela officials on 18 January 2018, singling them out as being responsible for deteriorating democracy in the country. The sanctioned individuals were prohibited from entering the nations of the European Union, and their assets were frozen. Cabello, known as number two in Chavismo, had not been sanctioned by the U.S. when the European Union sanctioned him.

==== United States ====
On 18 May 2018, the Office of Foreign Assets Control (OFAC) of the United States Department of the Treasury placed sanctions in effect against Cabello, his wife, his brother and his "testaferro" Rafael Sarria. OFAC stated that Cabello and others used their power within the Bolivarian government "to personally profit from extortion, money laundering, and embezzlement", with Cabello allegedly directing drug trafficking activities with Vice President of Venezuela, Tareck El Aissami while dividing profits with President Nicolás Maduro. The Office also stated that Cabello would use public information to track wealth individuals who were potentially drug trafficking and steal their drugs and property in order to get rid of potential competition. As a result of the sanctions, reports estimate that approximately $800 million worth of assets were frozen by the United States government. Cabello denied the reports, stating that it would be foolish to have assets located in a place where they could be seized.

==== Switzerland ====
On 28 March 2018, Cabello was sanctioned by Switzerland due to "human rights violations and the deterioration of the rule of law and democratic institutions", freezing their funds and banning them from entering Switzerland.

==== Mexico ====
The Mexican Senate froze the assets of officials of the Maduro administration, including Cabello, and prohibited them from entering Mexico on 20 April 2018.

==== Panama ====
In March 2018, Panama sanctioned 55 public officials, including Cabello; the officials were sanctioned by the Panamanian government for their alleged involvement with "money laundering, financing of terrorism and financing the proliferation of weapons of mass destruction".

== See also ==
- Enrique Gómez Martínez

Political offices
Preceded by Adina Bastidas Ramírez	Vice President of Venezuela; 13 January 2002 – 28 April 2002	Succeeded by José Vicente Rangel Vale
Preceded by Pedro Carmona; Interim	President of Venezuela (Acting); 13 April 2002 – 14 April 2002	Succeeded by Hugo Chávez
Preceded by Ramón Rodríguez Chacín	Minister of Interior and Justice; May 2002 – January 2003	Succeeded by Lucas Rincón Romero
Preceded by Enrique Mendoza	Governor of Miranda; 2004–2008	Succeeded by Henrique Capriles Radonski
Preceded by Fernando Soto Rojas	President of the National Assembly; 2012–2016	Succeeded by Henry Ramos Allup
