= Marleny Contreras =

Venezuelan engineer and politician

Marleny Josefina Contreras Hernández

Deputy of the National Assembly of Venezuela
- Incumbent
- Assumed office 5 January 2021
- Constituency: Miranda

First Lady of Venezuela
- In office 13 April 2002 – 14 April 2002
- President: Diosdado Cabello

Personal details
- Born: 14 June 1963 (age 62) Los Teques, Venezuela
- Party: United Socialist Party of Venezuela
- Spouse: Diosdado Cabello
- Children: 3 (including Daniella)

Marleny Josefina Contreras Hernández de Cabello (born 14 June 1963) is a Venezuelan engineer and politician, wife of Diosdado Cabello. She served as Minister for Public Works until 12 August 2019 and was also Minister of Popular Power for Tourism.

== Biography ==
Marleny is wife of the former president of the National Assembly (AN) and now president of the National Constituent Assembly (ANC) and vice president of the United Socialist Party of Venezuela (PSUV), Diosdado Cabello. She is a mother of three children.

She is a civil engineer and worked as a Collection Manager at SENIAT.

Contreras was a deputy of the National Assembly by the State of Miranda until 2015 where she was part of the permanent commission of Finance and Economic Development.

On 7 April 2015, she was appointed tourism minister of the Venezuelan government by President Nicolás Maduro.

On 14 June 2018, she is appointed Minister of the Popular Power for Public Works.

== Sanctions ==
On 18 May 2018, the Office of Foreign Assets Control (OFAC) of the United States Department of the Treasury placed sanctions in effect against Contreras and her husband.
