= El Furrial =

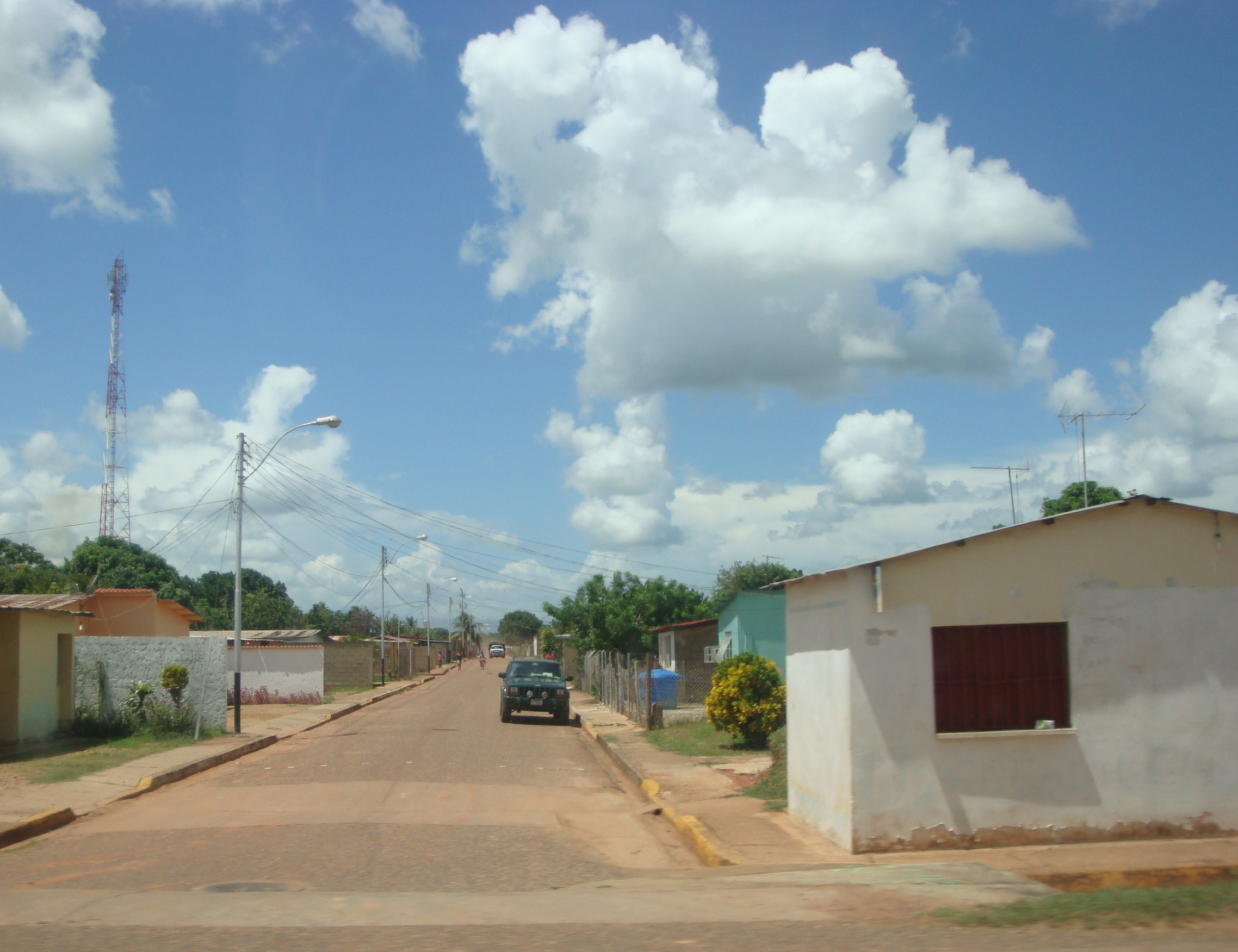

- Location within Venezuela
- Coordinates: 9°41′21″N 63°26′53″W
- Country: Venezuela
- State: Monagas
- Municipality: Maturín

Population (2011)
  - Total: 7,276

El Furrial is a town located in Maturín Municipality in the state of Monagas, Venezuela.

It is the birthplace of politician Diosdado Cabello.
