= List of governors of Miranda =

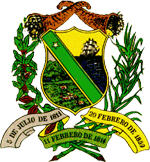
- State coat of arms

- Flag of the State
- Incumbent; Elio Serrano
- Style: Governor
- Status: Head of State
- Term length: Four years

This is a list of governors of the Venezuelan Miranda State:

Until 1989, they were appointed by the president of Venezuela. Starting from that year they are elected in universal, direct and secret elections.

== Appointed governors ==
| Image | Name | Appointed date | President |
|---|---|---|---|
| | Daniel Scott Cuervo | 1969 | Rafael Caldera |
| | Arnaldo Arocha | 1971 | Rafael Caldera |
| | Manuel Mantilla | 1974 | Carlos Andrés Pérez |
| | Edmundo Sánchez Verdú | 1986 | Jaime Lusinchi |
| | Ángel Zambrano | 1989 | Carlos Andrés Pérez |

== Elected governors ==
| Took office | Left office | Governor | Vote |
|---|---|---|---|
| 1989 | 1992 | Arnaldo Arocha, COPEI | 41.36 |
| 1992 | 1995 | Arnaldo Arocha, COPEI | 62.37 |
| 1995 | 1998 | Enrique Mendoza, COPEI | 43.91 |
| 1998 | 2000 | Enrique Mendoza, COPEI | 51.02 |
| 2000 | 2004 | Enrique Mendoza, COPEI | 64.81 |
| 2004 | 2008 | Diosdado Cabello, PSUV | 51.88 |
| 29 November 2008 | 6 June 2012 | Henrique Capriles Radonski, PJ | 52.56 |
| 6 June 2012 | 15 January 2013 | Adriana D'Elia, PJ | Acting |
| 15 January 2013 | 17 October 2017 | Henrique Capriles Radonski, PJ | 51.83 |
| 2017 | 2021 | Héctor Rodríguez, PSUV | 52.78 |
| 2021 | 2025 | Héctor Rodríguez, PSUV | 48.44 |
| 2025 | 2029 | Elio Serrano, GPPSB | 83.20 |

== See also ==
- List of Venezuela governors
- Politics of Venezuela
- History of Venezuela
