= Tazón massacre =

Non-fatal mass shooting of students in Caracas, Venezuela

- Location: Tazón toll, Caracas, Venezuela
- Date: 19 September 1984; Approximately 12:00 P.M.
- Weapons: Machine guns FN FAL; Pellet shotguns
- Deaths: 0
- Injuries: 35 students 3 national guards
- Perpetrators: National Guard of Venezuela; Lieutenant Colonel José Vizcuña

The Tazón massacre occurred on September 19, 1984, at the Tazón tollbooth in Caracas, Venezuela, when National Guard officials fired on a group of more than 200 student protestors, injuring at least 35. The students, who had arrived in four buses from the Maracay campus of the Central University of Venezuela, were protesting proposed cuts to the university's budget.

The incident led to multiple student protests at universities across the country, with demonstrators condemning the behavior of the security personnel and demanding the resignation of the university chancellor, Edmundo Chirinos. Despite the name "massacre," no student died during the protest.

== Background ==
After being elected as president in February 1984, Jaime Lusinchi announced the "Austerity Plan" on a national radio and television channel on March 14. The Plan suggested the reduction of state spending by 10% to face the delicate economic situation following Viernes Negro in 1983. Edmundo Chirinos, chancellor of the Central University of Venezuela, decided to submit to the University Council for a vote the application of cost-cutting measure in accordance with government policies and following in the footsteps of other chancellors such as those from the University of the Andes, Simón Bolívar University, and the Universidad Nacional Experimental Simón Rodríguez, including the elimination of scholarships, raising the dining fee to 10 Venezuelan bolívars, the payment of tuition fees, and the termination of internships.

Upon receiving the news, a group of Agronomy and Veterinary students from the Maracay Campus held a large assembly in room 6 of the faculty building on September 18, 1984, where they decided to transfer to the University City of Caracas, where the University Council was meeting, with a series of petitions to the authorities, alleging that on various dates they had asked for an audience with the chancellor and had been denied. The indignation of the students had originated because during the electoral campaign, Chirinos visited the installations of the Agronomy and Veterinary faculty accompanited by Tiburcio Linares, who would become the Secretary General of the university, promising to improve the dining hall without raising the fee. After the elections, a second meeting was held where the students proposed ways to finance the dining hall, but Chirinos responded, according to the accounts of students, "I did not come to discuss the policy, I came to tell it to you."

== Development ==
The next day, September 19, the group of students went to the Transport Directorate to request a ride to Caracas in order to protest gainst the policies that had been implemented by the assembly; before the denial of the petition, they took four buses and more than 200 students headed to Caracas. The dean of the faculty, Pedro Vegas, notified the chancellor about the news. Edmundo Chirinos decided to personally call the viceminister of interior relations Cesáreo Espinal Vásquez and ask him to stop the passage of the students to the capital, without consulting his administrative team. The buses were stopped at the National Guard checkpoint in Hoyo de la Puerta y students were instructed to vacate the units to be searched. The students demanded to be let pass by Lieutenant Colonel José Vizcuña, and in the face of his refusal, assemblies were held in each bus to decide whether to return or continue to Caracas. Two hours after being detained, they decided to start up the buses and to break through the military blockade. The soldiers began to fire against the buses, causing 35 students to be injured as well as 3 national guardsmen. The wounded students were transferred to the Coche hospital and to the Hospital Clínico Universitario.

== Reactions ==
=== Protests ===
Due to the three injured national guardsmen, various news sources reported the shooting as the result of an exchange of shots between the students and the military, accusation against which the former defended themselves.

We did not shoot [...] if any National Guard officer was shot and wounded, it was by themselves. That is why we are willing to submit ourselves to the kerosene test [...] now they want to confuse public opinion by pointing out that they were attacked by the students.

At 4 in the afternoon, a group meet in the Aula Magna of the university to discuss what actions to take. There, Chirinos was met with insults, booing, hitting, and pushing, demanding an explanation for the events. Chirinos alleged that his action was permitted by the law, that his attention had not been to aggravate anyone and that, to the contrary, he was looking to protect the "naïve students that were coming." Far from calming the audience, it only enraged the students more, who threw the bloody flannels of the wounded students at him and shouted slogans against the chancellor and against the Minister of Interior Relations Octavio Lepage, who had to escape through the back exit of the rool. After the assembly in the Aula Magna, there was violent unrest on the Plaza de Las Tres Gracias, where various vehicles were burnt by protestors and there was a confrontation between them and the Caracas Metropolitan Police, in which one student died and many were detained by the National Directorate of Intelligence and Prevention Services (DISIP).

At the behest of the University Council, all teaching and administrative activities were suspended for a week. The same night of the event the UCV was raided by National Guard staff and a command group from DISIP, who entered through la Plaza de Las Tres Gracias and took over the School of Pharmacy, the Engineering sheds, and Anatomical Institute of the School of Medicine.

In Maracay, El Limón avenue was taken over, traffic was stopped until noon and a student strike was proposed as a protest, declaring Chirinos a persona non grata. In Valencia there were disturbances in the surroundings of the University of Carabobo, where two buses and a truck were set on fire, generating traffic until the afternoon hours. In San Cristobal students of the Universidad de los Andes (ULA) protested all morning against the National Guard and the government, setting up barricades and burning tires, while in Maturin the entrances and exits of the Universidad de Oriente of Jusepin were obstructed. In Mérida the city was completely overridden by the riots of the students of the ULA, who burned the district house of the Democratic Action party and attacked the governor's office; the protest caused several injuries among policemen, police and national guards, besides the suspension of classes for several days. On the night of September 20, protests against the action of the Guard also took place in the 23 de Enero parish of Caracas; around blocks 5, 6 and 7 of the Monte Piedad sector a truck belonging to Electricidad de Caracas was set on fire, causing the seizure of the place by members of the Metropolitan Police.

Two days after the shooting in Tazón there were peaceful student demonstrations in solidarity with the wounded in various cities throughout the country, such as Maracaibo, Maracay, Barcelona, and Maturín. A group of student leaders of UCV met with Octavio Lepage and his vice-minister Cesáreo Espinal Vásquez, where the governor of Caracas, Carmelo Lauría, was also present, as well as the commander of the Metropolitan Police, Marcos Adolfo Pacheco. In the meeting the government promised to prohibit the use of firearms in student protests and encouraged talks with students in order to come to an agreement without resorting to violence.

=== Government ===
The president at the time, Jaime Lusinchi, after being informed about the events, stated:

[...] there are some accounts of events that are trying to take advantage of that situation in order to create disruptions in the public order and that I am not willing to tolerate them and I am going to confront them decisively. (...) what happens in the national universities it is simply the representation of a very serious distortion of our education, but the fact that subversive agents want to take the occasion to carry out their purposes is a different matter, and the youth should not play the role of useful idiots.

The government's statement caused indignation among the students, who expected a different reaction, declaring: "We have not been useful idiots nor acted with subversive purposes, but in response to the mandate of the university assemblies, we came to Caracas to deliver to the UCV Rector a list of petitions showcasing the student demands we have devised...". Octavio Lepage also attributed the responsibility to minority leftist groups "who do not conceive of life without violence", criticizing the machine-gunning but considering the detention of the buses in accordance with the law. On the other hand, the Congress of the Republic created a special commission for the investigation of the events, integrated by deputies Nelson Valera, Domingo Alberto Rangel, Douglas Jatem, Anselmo Natale and Paciano Padrón, and at the same time the Attorney General's Office also started investigations.

=== Political Parties ===
Several political parties stated their opinions on the events. Democratic Action condemned the actions of the National Guard, but also urged the students not to fall into the trap of the "ultra left" and the "office agitators". COPEI called on the government to clarify the statements about the subversive groups involved in the shooting, requesting Chirinos to resign from the chancellorship and assume his responsibility before the students and the country. Leftist parties, including the Movimiento al Socialismo, the Revolutionary Left Movement, the Movimiento Electoral del Pueblo and Nueva Alternativa, some of which supported Chirinos during the electoral campaign, condemned the actions of the National Guard, the statements of the president and the actions of the chancellor, but declared that demanding the resignation of Chirinos was a political mistake as they considered that the university could be manipulated by the government in view of the power vacuum he would leave behind. The Communist Party and the Socialist League announced the rupture with Chirinos' management and raised the need for his resignation, objecting to his conduct not only for his actions in the face of the events of reason but also for his close ties with the government, considering that he had betrayed the principles of the left by associating with the government and making university decisions without consulting the political forces that supported him.

=== Professors ===
Although Chirinos' staff supported his decision, arguing that he had acted in accordance with the law in the context of the fact that the students had hijacked the buses, a group of sixty-four professors, including Nora Castañeda and Simón Sáez Mérida, most of whom had spoken in favor of Chirinos' election during the campaign, published a communiqué requesting his resignation under the following arguments:

For the first time in the history of the university, a democratically elected chancellor resorts to extra-university forces to resolve conflicts in the community. This attitude shows his absolute incapacity to manage the destiny of the university. All of the above leads us to demand in the most responsible manner [...] to Dr. Edmundo Chirinos his irrevocable resignation as chancellor of the UCV [...].

The political prisoners of the San Carlos barracks issued a press release denouncing the action of Chirinos, the National Guard and the government in trying to distort the aggression, and expressing their solidarity with the students:

We extend our word of solidarity and encouragement to all Venezuelan students, and we call on all to join our voices in repudiating the aggression to which they were subjected. The distorting maneuver that pretends to present the facts as the result of alleged subversive activities, a convenient and hackneyed excuse to which government spokespersons permanently resort to avoid responsibility and hide the reality, must be prevented at all costs.

Edmundo Chirinos declared that the action of the National Guard had been unconscionable, defending himself by saying that in a single trimester his administration had been the most successful in the history of the university, considering it unfair to condemn him for the incident. In his first statement, he admitted to having made a mistake in deciding to directly communicate with the ministry, but claimed not to have imagined the military's action due to the good relations he had with the guard.

== Consequences ==
Chirinos presented his resignation to the University Council the day after the events, attempting to resign along with his staff, which was rejected. This refusal was seen by both students and employees as a maneuver by the university authorities to worsen the conditions for his departure. The students demanded that instead of resigning, he be dismissed by the University Senate or by the National Council of Universities (CNU). After several days of pressure exerted by the university community, Chirinos formally presented a temporary resignation, which this time was accepted by the University Council. Before the results of a referendum to determine Chirinos' fate were known, he was reinstated to his position, a fact that was not well received by the students of Maracay, who proposed a three-day strike. The results of the consultation denied Chirino's resignation, with almost four thousand votes out of five thousand two hundred students consulted. The students of Maracay had to recognize the results and retract their decision to reject Chirinos as their chancellor.

== See also ==
- Operación Canguro
- Central University of Venezuela rectorate takeover
