= José David =

José David is a given name. Notable people with the name include:

- José David Cabello (born 1969), Venezuelan politician
- José David Domínguez (born 1980), Spanish race walker
- José David Flores (born 1971), Puerto Rican baseball coach
- José David de Gea (born 1977), Spanish motorcycle racer
- José David Leudo (born 1993), Colombian footballer
- José David Mosquera (born 1983), Colombian boxer
- José David Name (born 1968), Colombian politician
- José David Sierra (born 1980), Puerto Rican drag queen best known as Jessica Wild
- José David Suárez (1953–2019), Cuban volleyball player
