= Operación Canguro =

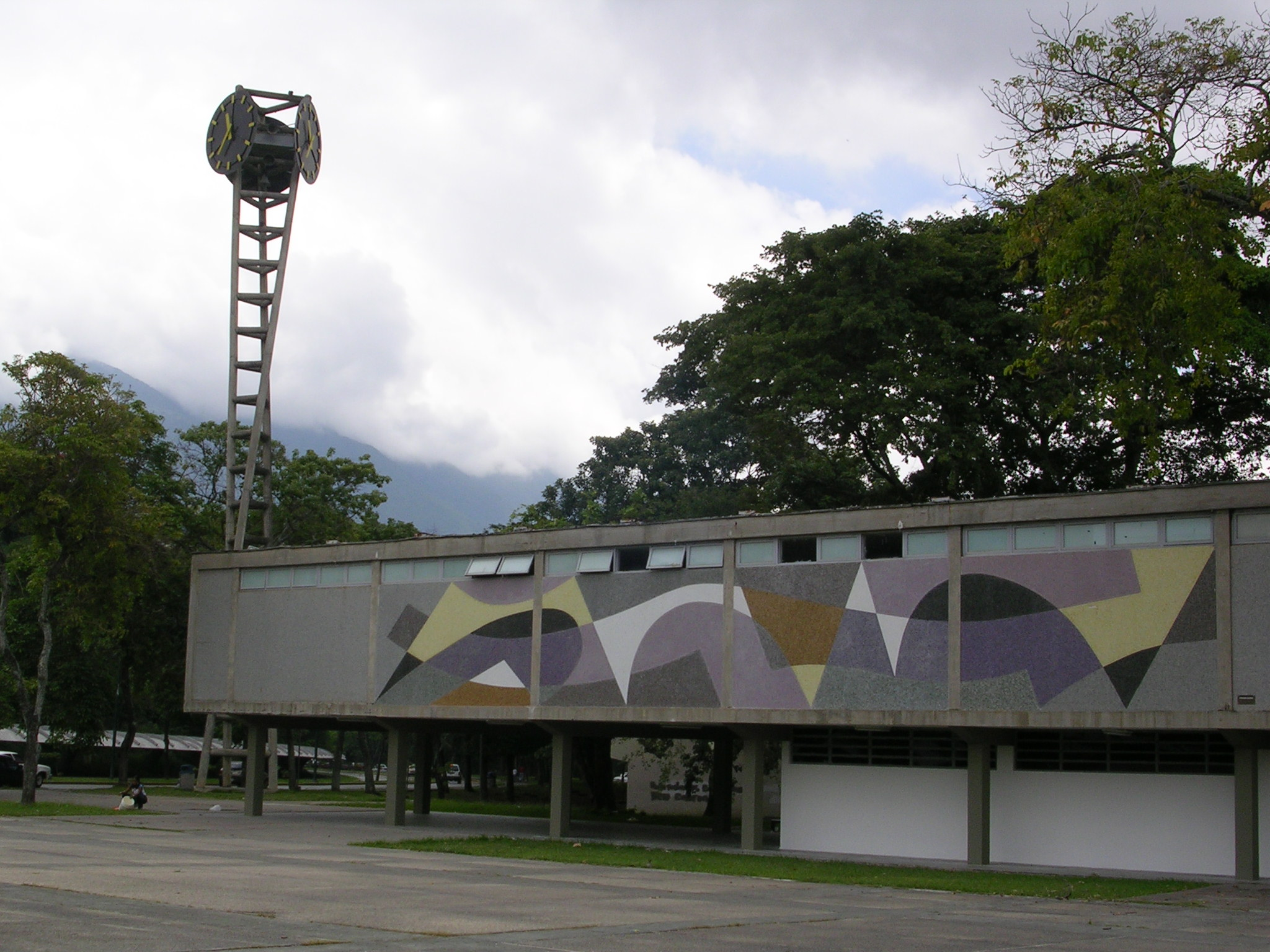
- The Clock and a mural by Armando Barrios located in the Rectory Plaza, at the University City of Caracas.
- Date: 31 October 1969
- Location: Central University of Venezuela, Caracas, Venezuela
- Outcome: Central University of Venezuela intervened by the government of Rafael Caldera.

Operación Canguro was the intervention of the Central University of Venezuela on 31 October 1969 by orders of President Rafael Caldera.

== Background ==
Venezuelan universities began a process of internal renewal during the rise of the counterculture, the social movements of 1968, the May 1968 in France and other student movements during the same year. The government introduced a reform to the Law of Universities that a large part of the university sector considered that it undermined the principle of university autonomy. The rector of the Central University of Venezuela, Jesús María Bianco, was dismissed by the Provisional National Council of Universities when he refused to attend the newly created body.

In 1969, the Movimiento de Renovación Universitaria (University Renewal Movement) gained strength, whose radical proposals alarmed both the government and the opposition. The links of sectors of the university with extremists, under the protection of university autonomy, led to strong pressure to limit it. Said pressure culminated in Operación Canguro.

== Intervention ==
The Operación Canguro authorized the university's intervention. The government described the raid as a preventive seizure of the spaces of the Botanical Garden and the Covered Gymnasium, arguing that the objective was capturing snipers that were stationed there.

It took months before activities at the university returned to normal. Student protests spread to other universities and several high schools nationwide, and the government had to deal with both student and faculty protests. Several students emigrated to study in other countries because of the situation. In January 1971 the government appointed interim authorities: Rafael-Clemente Arráiz as rector, Oswaldo De Sola as academic vice-rector and Eduardo Vásquez as secretary. Arráiz resigned, refusing to keep the university closed and proposing the immediate convocation of elections within the university, so De Sola was appointed as rector in March 1971.

== See also ==
- First presidency of Rafael Caldera
- Tazón massacre
- Central University of Venezuela rectorate takeover
