= Glenna Cabello =

Venezuelan political scientist

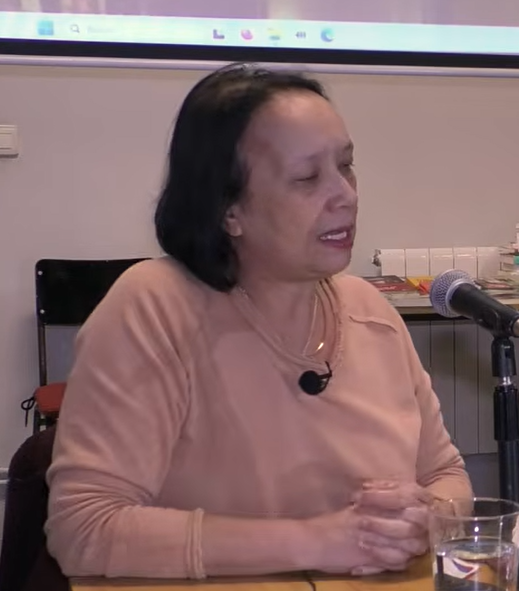

Consul of Venezuela to Paris

Personal details
- Born: Glenna del Valle Cabello Rondón; 26 December 1959 (age 66) Maturín, Monagas, Venezuela
- Relatives: Diosdado Cabello (brother); José David Cabello (brother)
- Occupation: Political scientist

Glenna del Valle Cabello Rondón (26 December 1959) is a Venezuelan political scientist.

== Public positions ==
Glenna has held diplomatic positions during the administration of Nicolás Maduro, including as counselor to the Permanent Mission of Venezuela to the United Nations and Venezuela's consul in Paris, France.

== Personal life ==
Her brother Diosdado Cabello has been president of the National Assembly and vice-president of the United Socialist Party of Venezuela (PSUV). Her brother José David Cabello has served as Minister for Industry, Director of the National Center for Foreign Commerce (Cencoex) and National Integrated Service for the Administration of Customs Duties and Taxes (Seniat).
