= Daniella Cabello =

Venezuelan singer, television producer and radio presenter

- Daniella Desirée Cabello Contreras

Ministra del Poder Popular para el Turismo
- Incumbent
- Assumed office February 2, 2026
- President: Delcy Rodríguez (acting president)
- Preceded by: Leticia Gómez

Personal details
- Born: Daniella Desirée Cabello Contreras; April 11, 1992 (age 34) San Antonio de los Altos, Venezuela
- Party: PSUV
- Spouse: Omar Acedo (c. 2019)
- Children: 1 (Danna Isabella Acedo Cabello)
- Parent(s): Diosdado Cabello (father); Marleny Contreras (mother)
- Occupation: Singer tv producer politician

Daniella Desirée Cabello Contreras (born April 11, 1992) is a Venezuelan singer, television producer, and politician. She serves as Minister of Tourism in the government of Venezuela's interim president, Delcy Rodríguez.

== Biography ==
Born in San Antonio de Los Altos, a city that is part of Greater Caracas, Daniella is the daughter of politicians Diosdado Cabello and Marleny Contreras.

As a singer, she debuted her song Invencible on the state-run Venezolana de Televisión (VTV) channel, which led to her being selected as the face of the 2014 Venezuela International Tourism Fair (Fitven). She starred in the videos La verdad de Venezuela, produced by the Jorge Rodríguez Padre Foundation and premiered on her father's show, Con el mazo dando, on the TVes channel. She was also a producer on the program Con el Mazo Dando. That year, she participated in the Suena Caracas Festival, where she was booed.

At a press conference in August 2015, Tarek El Aissami released a video of José Pérez Venta, who had been arrested and charged with dismembering a woman, in which he claimed that Andrea González had contacted him to murder Daniella Cabello for US$500,000, which resulted in her and her husband's arrest. González was considered an opponent of the government at the time. The media outlet Runrunes later refuted this version, reporting that Pérez was a government infiltrator in the opposition.

She began studying Political Science at the Central University of Venezuela (UCV), but did not complete the course. While studying, he enrolled as a student of Political Science and Sociology at the Federal University of Latin American Integration (Unila), but dropped out in 2016. In February 2020, the American social network Twitter closed his account.

In September 2024, Nicolás Maduro created the Venezuelan Export Promotion Agency to replace CADIVI, which will be headed by Daniela Cabello. In February 2026, Venezuela's interim president, Delcy Rodríguez, appointed her Minister of Tourism.

== Personal life ==
After five years of dating, on December 26, 2019, she married her music producer, singer Omar Acedo, in a civil ceremony. On December 27, a religious ceremony was held at the Military Circle in Caracas, where guests had to leave their cell phones behind to prevent recordings. On February 22, 2022, she became a mother when she gave birth to her first daughter, Danna Isabella Acedo Cabello.

=== Sanctions ===
In November 2024, the U.S. Department of the Treasury (USDT) imposed sanctions on 21 senior officials in Nicolás Maduro's government. Among those sanctioned is Daniella Cabello.
