= Arnaldo Arocha =

Venezuelan politician (1936–2022)

Governor of Miranda
- In office 19 January 1990 – 27 December 1995
- Preceded by: Ángel Zambrano
- Succeeded by: Enrique Mendoza
- In office 22 April 1971 – 11 March 1974
- Preceded by: Daniel Scott Cuervo
- Succeeded by: Manuel Mantilla

Member of the Venezuelan Chamber of Deputies
- In office 1984–1989
- In office 1969–1974

Personal details
- Born: Arnaldo Horacio Arocha Vargas; 10 September 1936 Charallave, United States of Venezuela
- Died: 8 February 2022 (aged 85) Charallave
- Party: Copei

Arnaldo Horacio Arocha Vargas (10 September 1936 – 8 February 2022) was a Venezuelan politician. A member of Copei, he served as Governor of Miranda from 1971 to 1974 and again from 1990 to 1995. He also served in the Venezuelan Chamber of Deputies from 1969 to 1974 and again from 1984 to 1989. He died on 8 February 2022, at the age of 85.
