= José David Cabello =

Venezuelan politician (born 1969)

Venezuelan Minister of Infrastructure
- In office 3 July 2006 – 1 February 2008
- Preceded by: Ramón Carrizales
- Succeeded by: Isidro Ubaldo Rondón Torres

Personal details
- Born: José David Cabello Rondón; 11 September 1969 (age 56) Venezuela
- Party: United Socialist Party of Venezuela
- Relatives: Diosdado Cabello (brother); Glenna Cabello (sister)

José David Cabello Rondón (11 September 1969) is a Venezuelan politician. In July 2006 was appointed Venezuelan Minister of Infrastructure, and in February 2008 he became the head of SENIAT, the Venezuelan tax agency. He had previously been head of Conviasa (from April to June 2006).

== Sanctions ==
The government of Canada sanctioned Cabello as being someone who participated in "significant acts of corruption or who have been involved in serious violations of human rights". On 18 May 2018, the Office of Foreign Assets Control (OFAC) of the United States Department of the Treasury placed sanctions in effect against Cabello. OFAC stated that Cabello would use his position in SENIAT for extortion and money laundering.

== Personal life ==
He is the brother of Diosdado Cabello and Glenna Cabello.
