= Manuel Mantilla (politician) =

Venezuelan politician

Venezuelan Minister of the Interior
- In office 1978–1979
- President: Carlos Andrés Pérez
- Preceded by: Octavio Lepage
- Succeeded by: Rafael Montes de Oca

Governor of Miranda
- Incumbent
- Assumed office 1974
- President: Carlos Andrés Pérez
- Preceded by: Arnaldo Arocha
- Succeeded by: Edmundo Sánchez Verdú

Minister of Internal Affairs
- In office 1963–1964
- President: Rómulo Betancourt
- Preceded by: Carlos Andrés Pérez
- Succeeded by: Gonzalo Barrios

Secretary of the Presidency
- In office 1964–1969
- President: Raúl Leoni

Personal details
- Party: Democratic Action

Manuel Mantilla was a Venezuelan politician. Throughout his career, he served as the appointed governor of Miranda and as a minister in the governments of Rómulo Betancourt, Raúl Leoni, and Carlos Andrés Pérez.

== Biography ==
Mantilla was a member of the Democratic Action party. In September 1963, he was appointed Minister of Interior during the second government of Rómulo Betancourt (1959–1964), a position he held until March 1964.

During the presidency of Raúl Leoni (1964–1969), he served as the Secretary of the Presidency and was described by journalist Carlos Rangel as "the man closest to President Leoni and the most powerful man in that government after the president". He took part in a meeting where it was decided to condemn Cuba at the Organization of American States over the Machurucuto raid in 1967.

During the first presidency of Carlos Andrés Pérez (1974–1979), he was appointed governor of Miranda and later returned to his post as Minister of Interior.
