= Caracas Botanical Garden =

- Jardín Botánico de Caracas
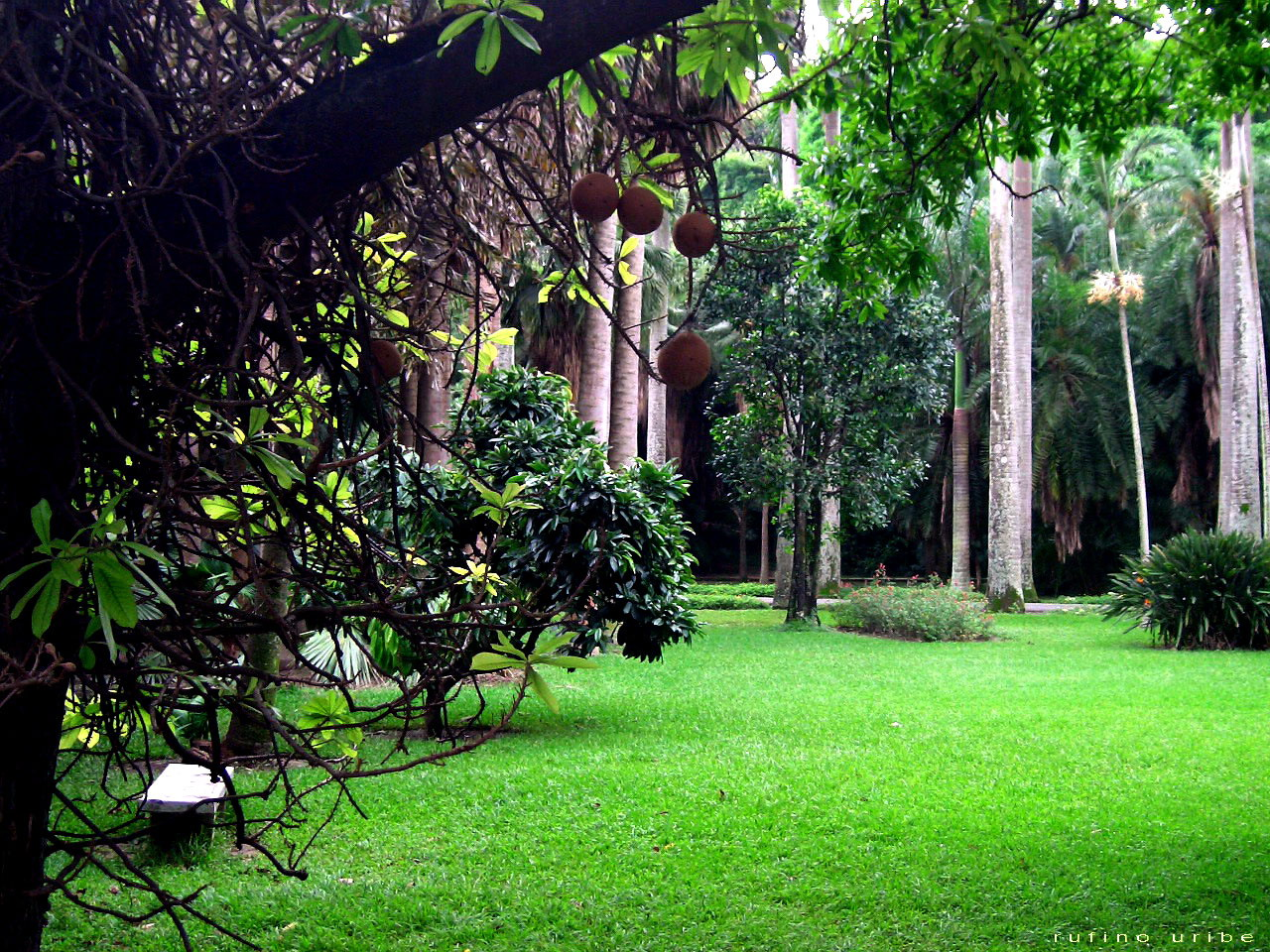
- Interactive map of Caracas Botanical Garden
- Type: Botanical garden
- Location: Caracas, Venezuela
- Coordinates: 10°29′46″N 66°53′54″W
- Area: 70 hectares (170 acres)
- Opened: 1958
- Operator: Central University of Venezuela
- Website: www.fibv.org.ve

The Caracas Botanical Garden (Spanish: Jardín Botánico de Caracas), also known as Central University of Venezuela Botanical Garden (Jardín Botánico de la Universidad Central de Venezuela), is part of the University City of Caracas World Heritage Site.

The garden extends for 70 hectares and is administered by the Botanic Institute of Venezuela (FIVB). Its code of international recognition as a botanical institution, as well as the acronym of the herbarium, is VEN.

It is located in the geographic center of Caracas, forming part of the whole of the University City, with its main entrance at Salvador Allende Avenue off the bridge that connects Plaza Venezuela with the Tamanaco Entrance of the UCV.

== History ==
In 1945, intense scientific work began on the reforestation and planting of exotic trees on lands of the former Ibarra estate to give life to the Botanical Garden of the UCV under the direction of Dr. Tobias Lasser, supported by the Swiss horticulturist August Braun and Venezuelan outfielder Pedro Naspe.

Opened to the public in 1958, this was the country's first botanical garden and was part of the original project of the University City of Caracas. In addition to hosting the National Herbarium, the Botanical Institute of Venezuela has an extensive art collection. The garden, as part of the University City, is one of two botanical gardens named as a World Heritage Site; the other is Kew Royal Botanic Garden in London.

Students of the Central University of Venezuela and city inhabitants, as well as tourists, once enjoyed visits to the garden when it was being properly maintained.

=== Bolivarian Venezuela ===
During the crisis in Bolivarian Venezuela, many of the garden's features were stolen, destroyed or died as a result of mismanagement. Lagoons and plants have dried up due to shortages in Venezuela, where water is scarce, with more than one-third of the multiple palm tree species dying in the gardens. Santa Cruz water-lilies, once a popular feature in the gardens, have all died out. Due to the crisis, looters stole electrical wiring, plumbing and computers that helped irrigate the gardens while the guard station tasked with securing the area was completely stripped of all material from the roof to the foundation.

In July 2018, the gardens received only an annual budget of $66 per year, with curators working desperately to maintain the gardens despite the lack of resources.

== Features ==
The Botanical Garden of Caracas had more than 2,500 species that corresponded to about 200 botanical families, of which 50% were from Venezuela, the rest of Central America, Africa, India and other regions of Asia and South America.

Of its 70 hectares, 15 of them had certain areas where the plants were distributed by sectors, the remaining 55 hectares, were reforested and have been dedicated as a preserved native forest.

Areas that were once included were:

- Laguna Principal
- Interpreting Paths
- Orchid
- Tropical Humid Forest
- Laguna Venezuela
- Xeroitic Garden
- Palmetum, was one of the most important collections of Palms in Latin America, housing some 4,000 specimens of about 250 species.
- Zingiberales
- Bromeliad
- Aráceas
- Recreational didactic zone
- Economic Garden
- Arboretum

== Gallery ==
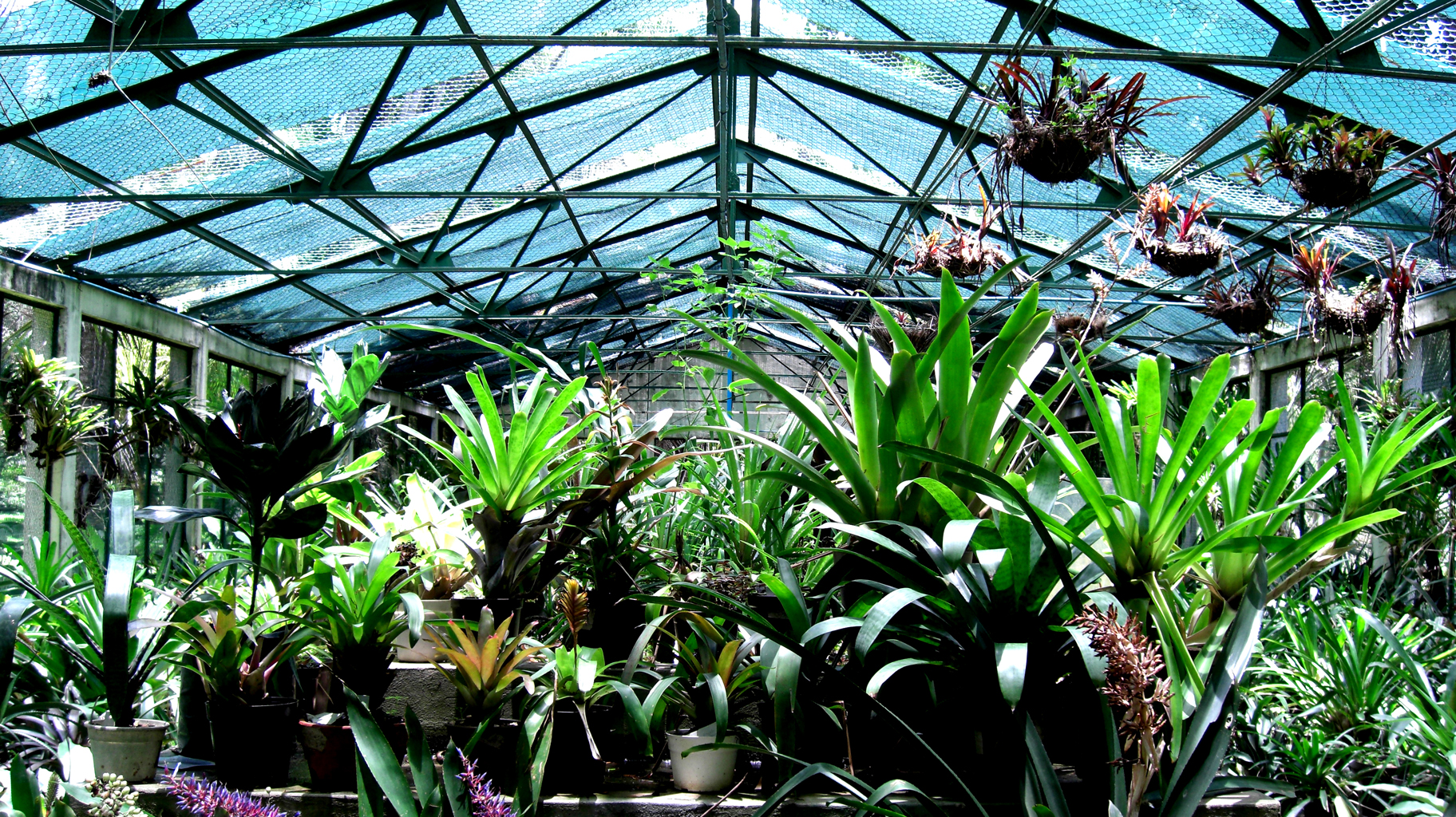

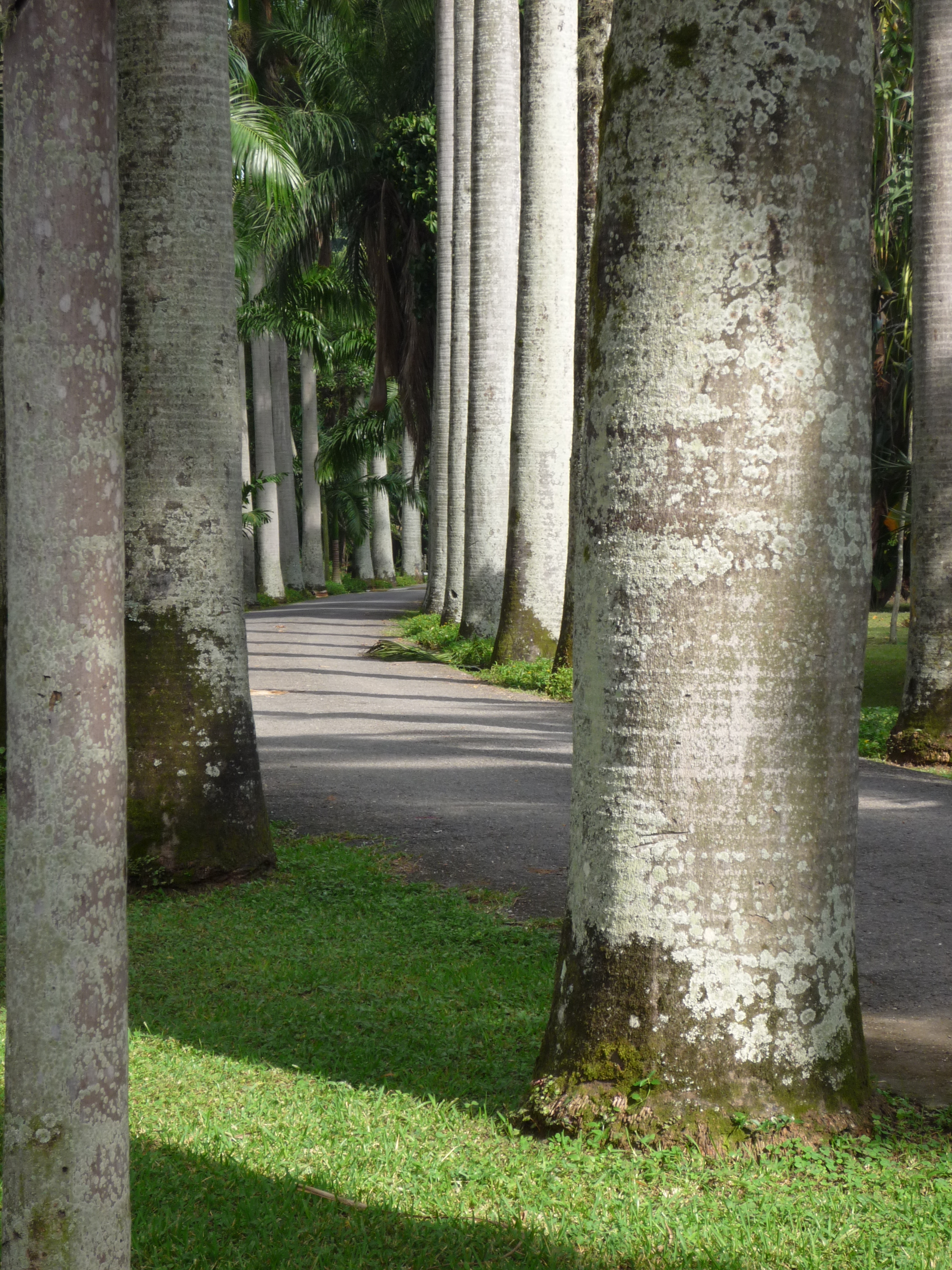

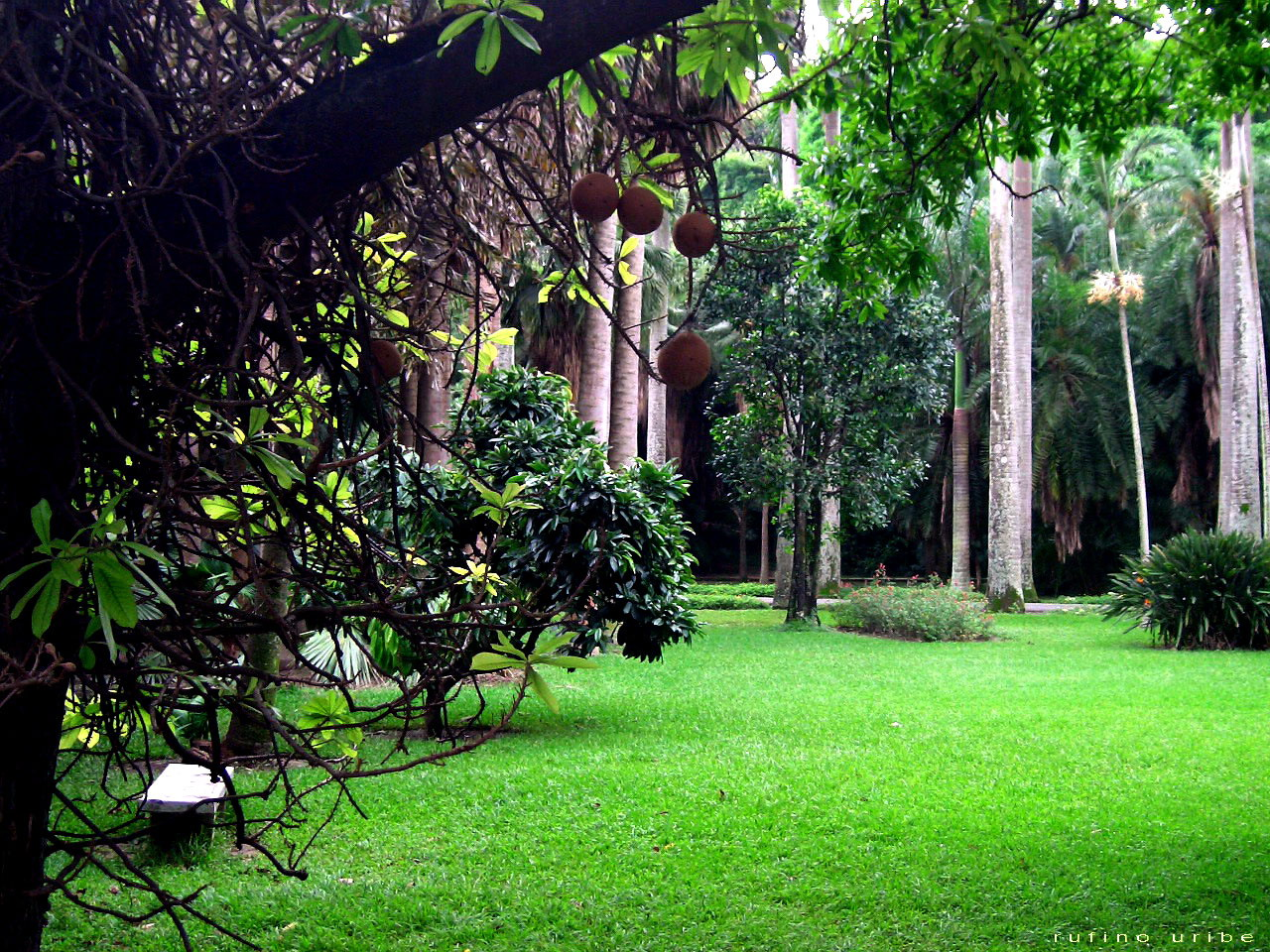

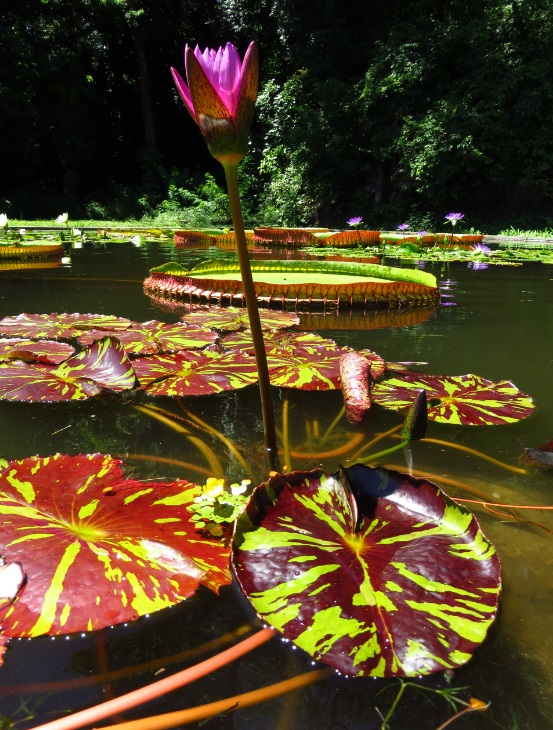

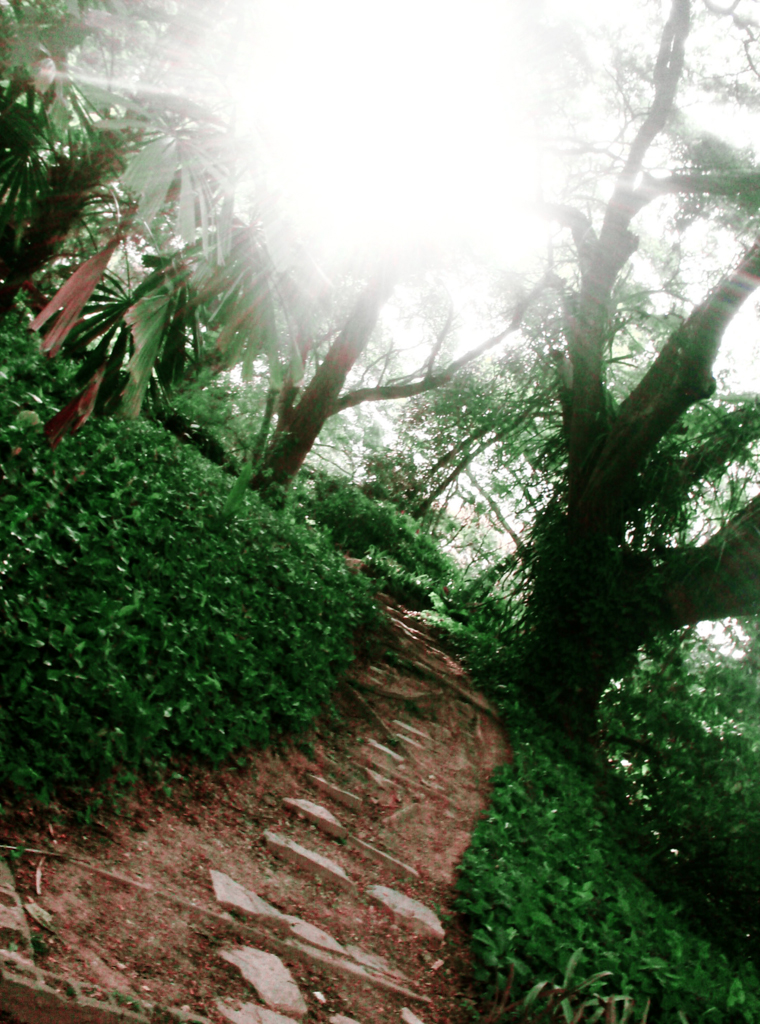

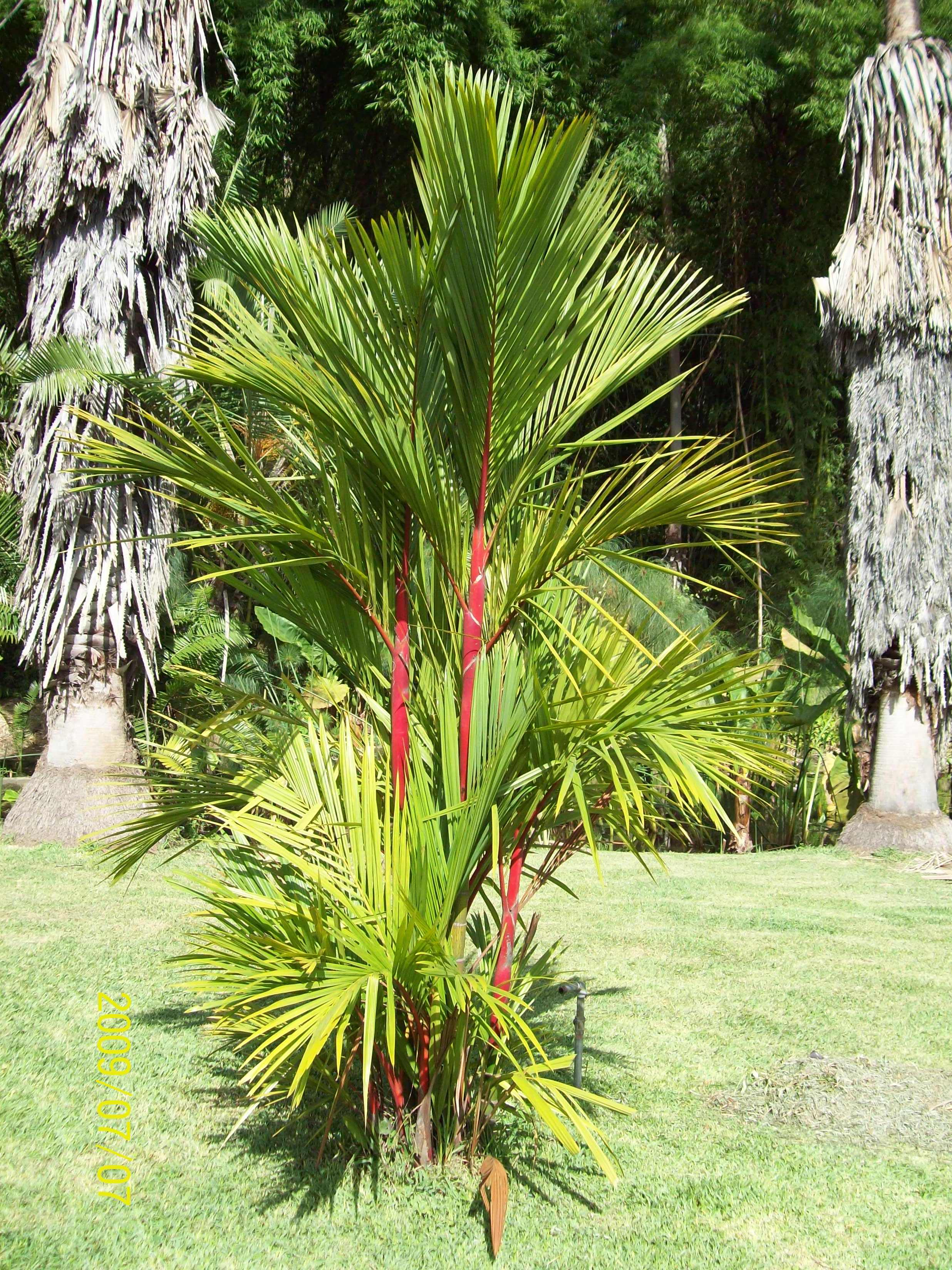

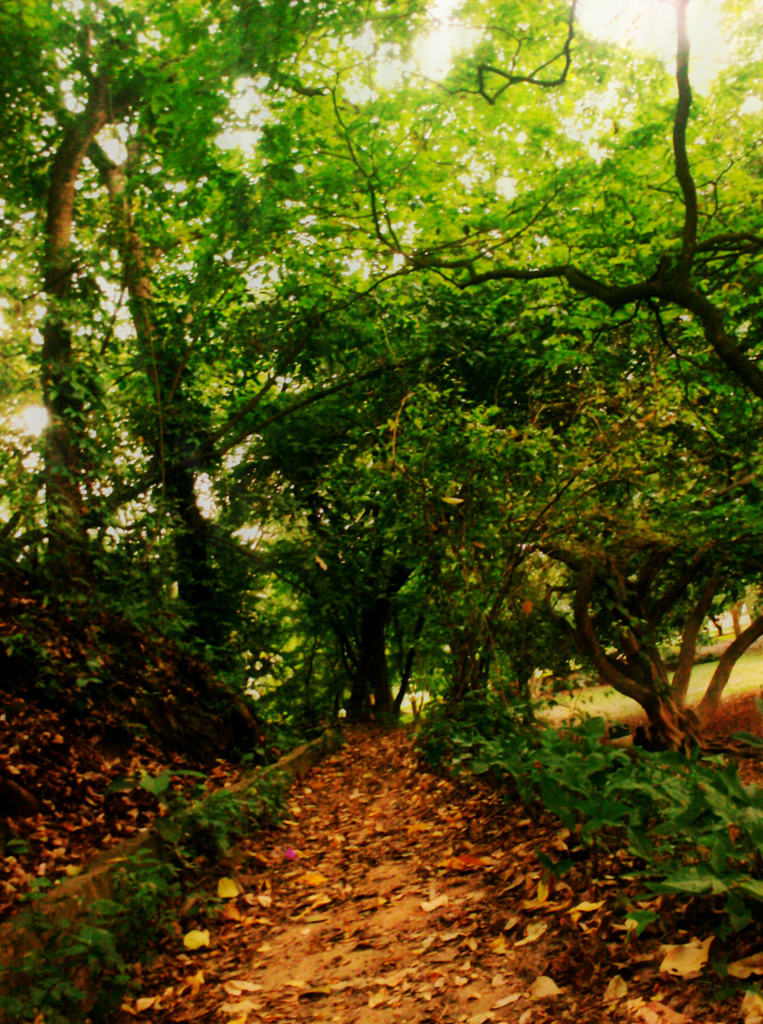

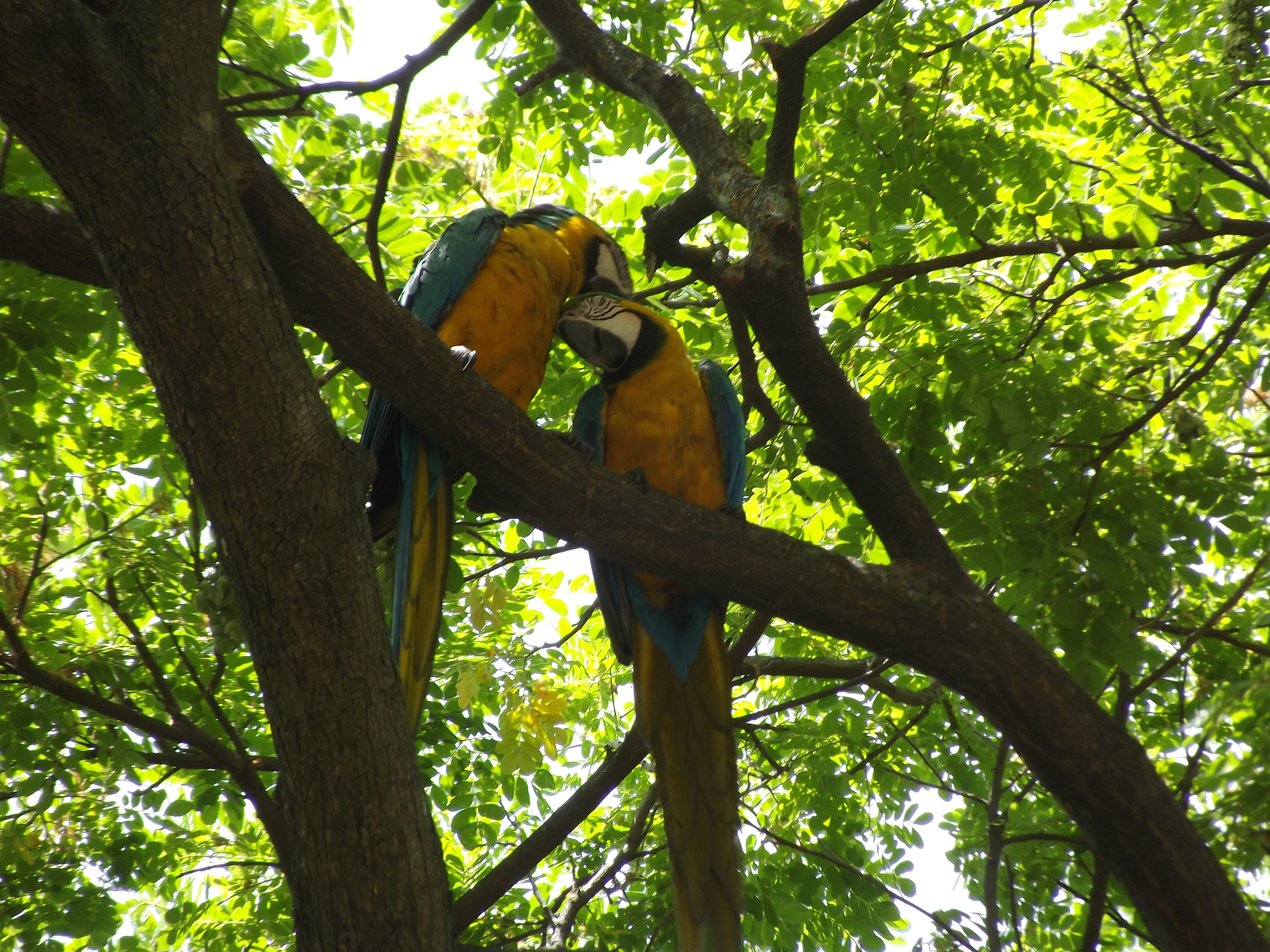

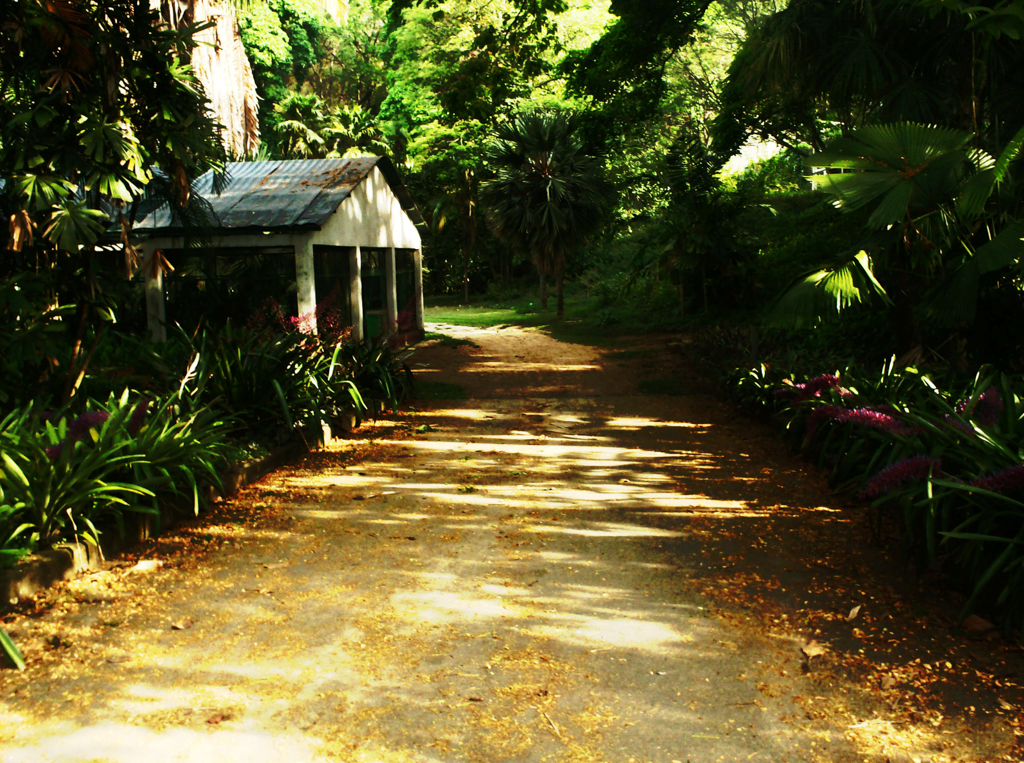

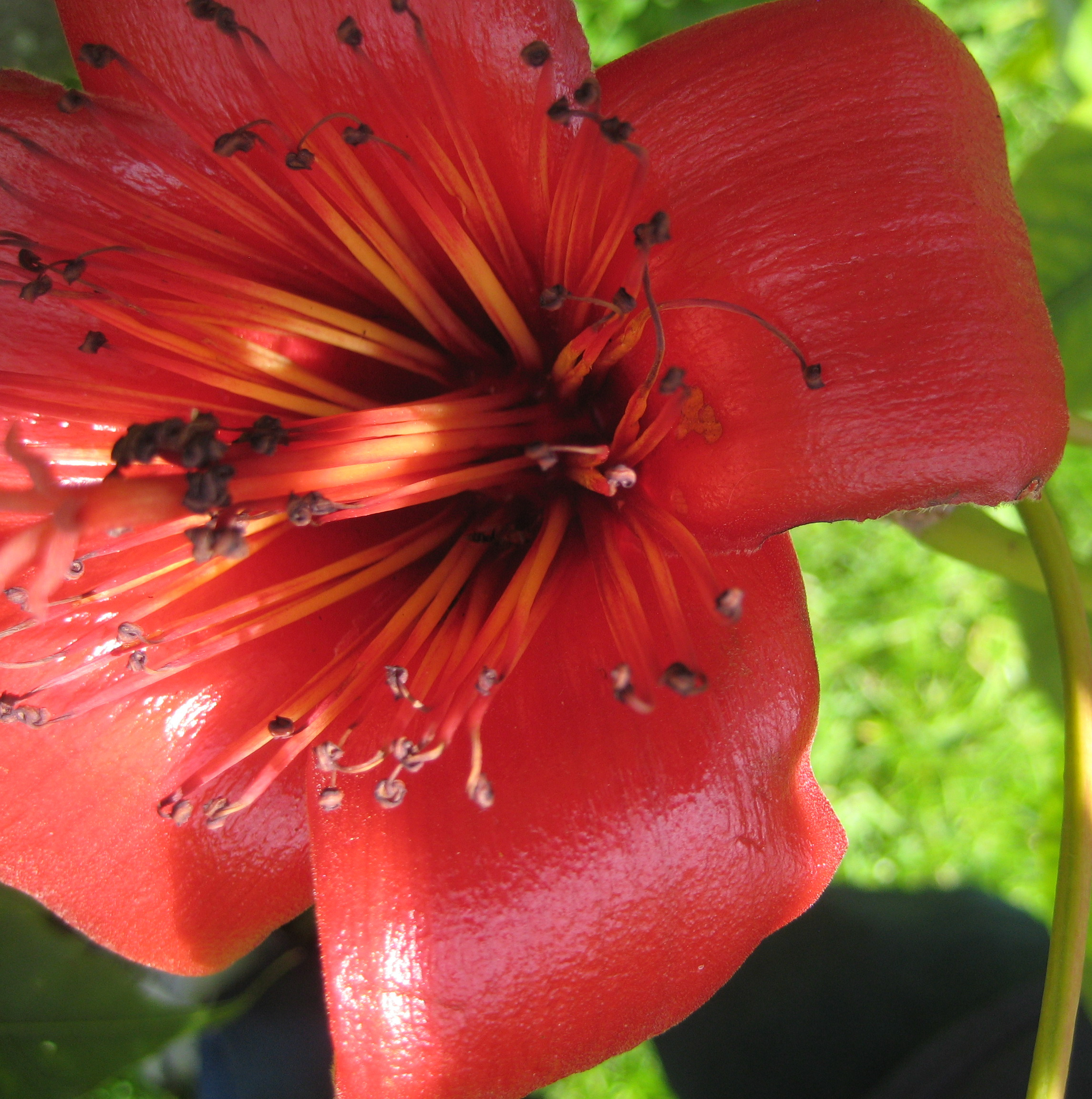

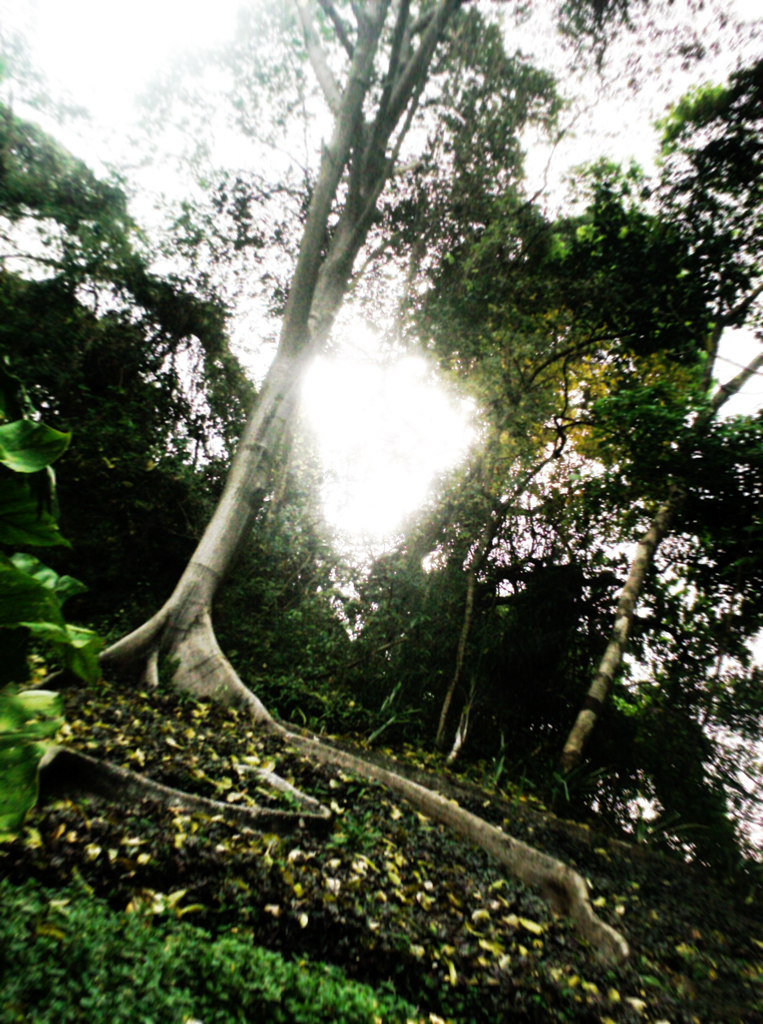

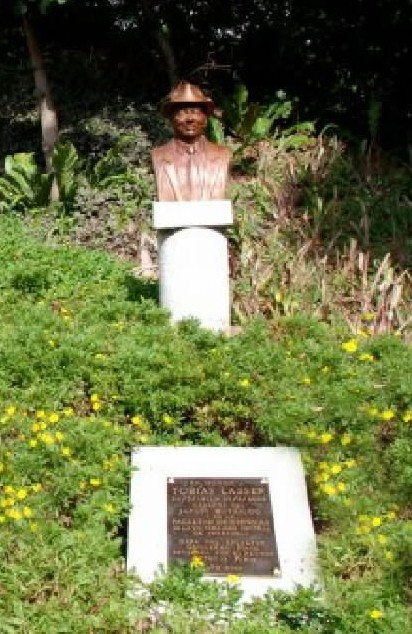

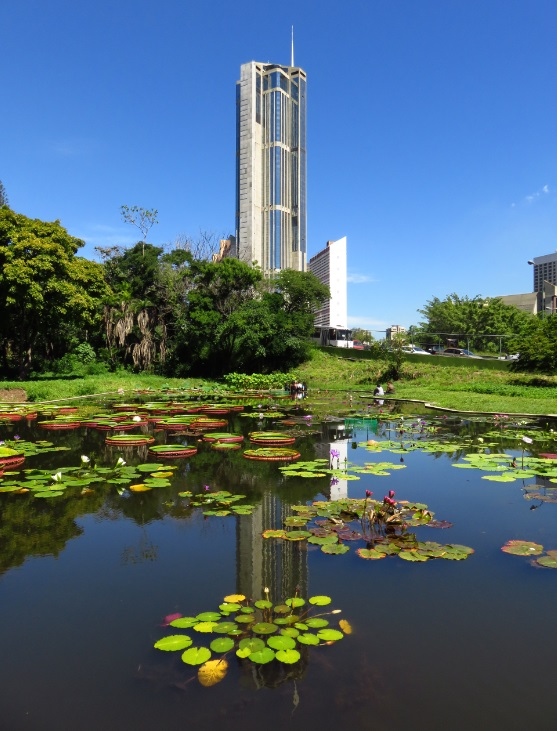

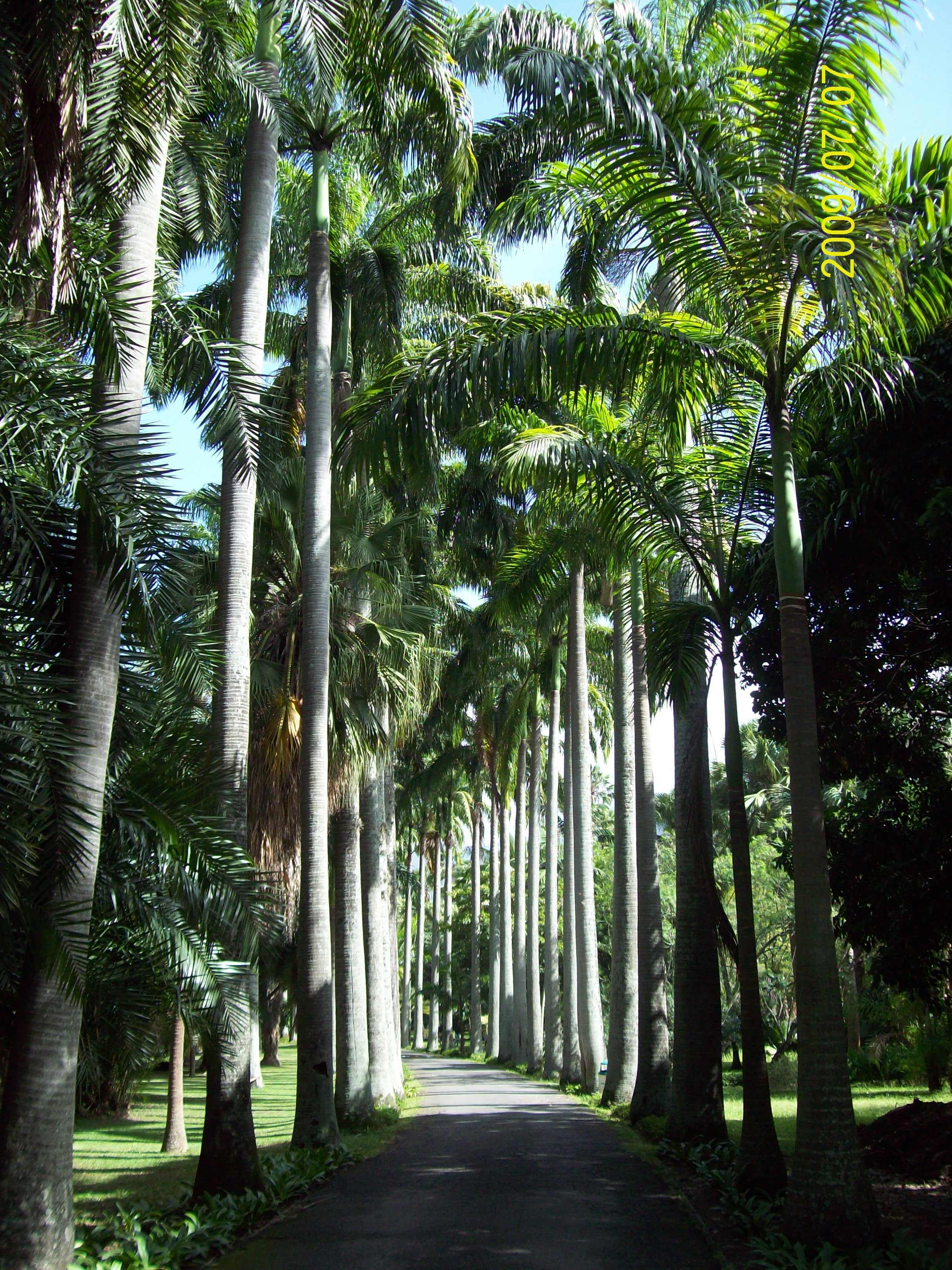

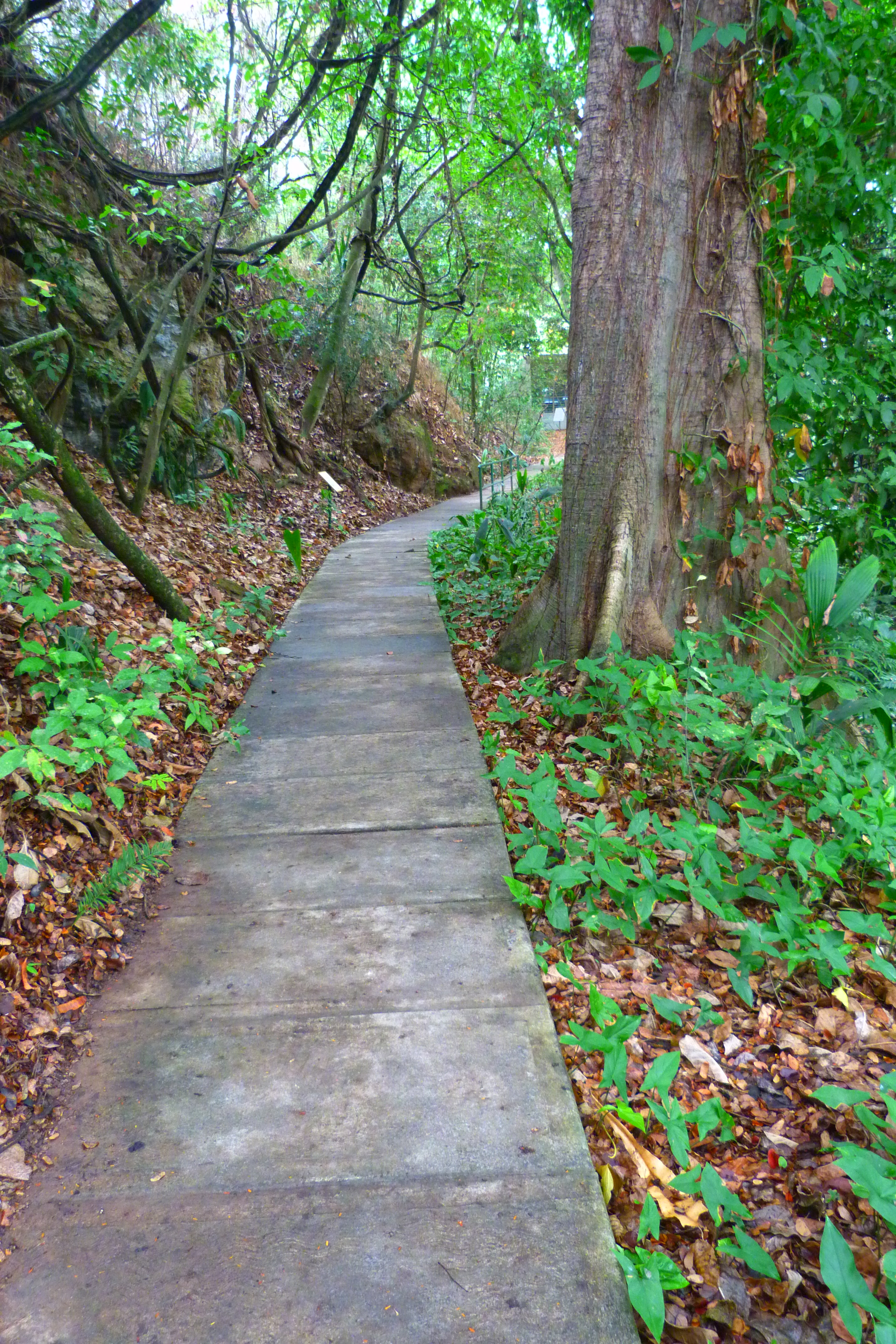

== See also ==
- List of national parks of Venezuela
- Botanical Garden of Mérida
