= Enrique Mendoza =

Venezuelan politician (1945–2023)

Mayor of Sucre, Miranda
- In office 1989–1995
- Succeeded by: Raoul Bermúdez

34th Governor of Miranda
- In office 1995–2004
- Preceded by: Arnaldo Arocha
- Succeeded by: Diosdado Cabello

Personal details
- Born: 11 August 1945 Caracas, Venezuela
- Died: 3 April 2023 (aged 77) Caracas, Venezuela
- Party: COPEI

Enrique Mendoza D'Ascoli (11 August 1945 – 3 April 2023) was a Venezuelan politician.

== Career ==
From 1989 until 1996, Mendoza was the mayor of Sucre Municipality, Miranda, in the Metropolitan District of Caracas; he was governor of Miranda state from 1995 to 2004, and was re-elected in 1998 and 2000. In 2004, Mendoza was chosen as head of the Coordinadora Democrática.

The U.S. Department of State mentioned Mendoza in its 2008 Human Rights report as denial of a fair public trial.

Mendoza died of leukaemia on 3 April 2023, at the age of 77.

== See also ==
- Political prisoners in Venezuela
