= Botanical Garden of Mérida =

Botanical garden in Mérida, Venezuela

- Centro Jardín Botánico de Mérida
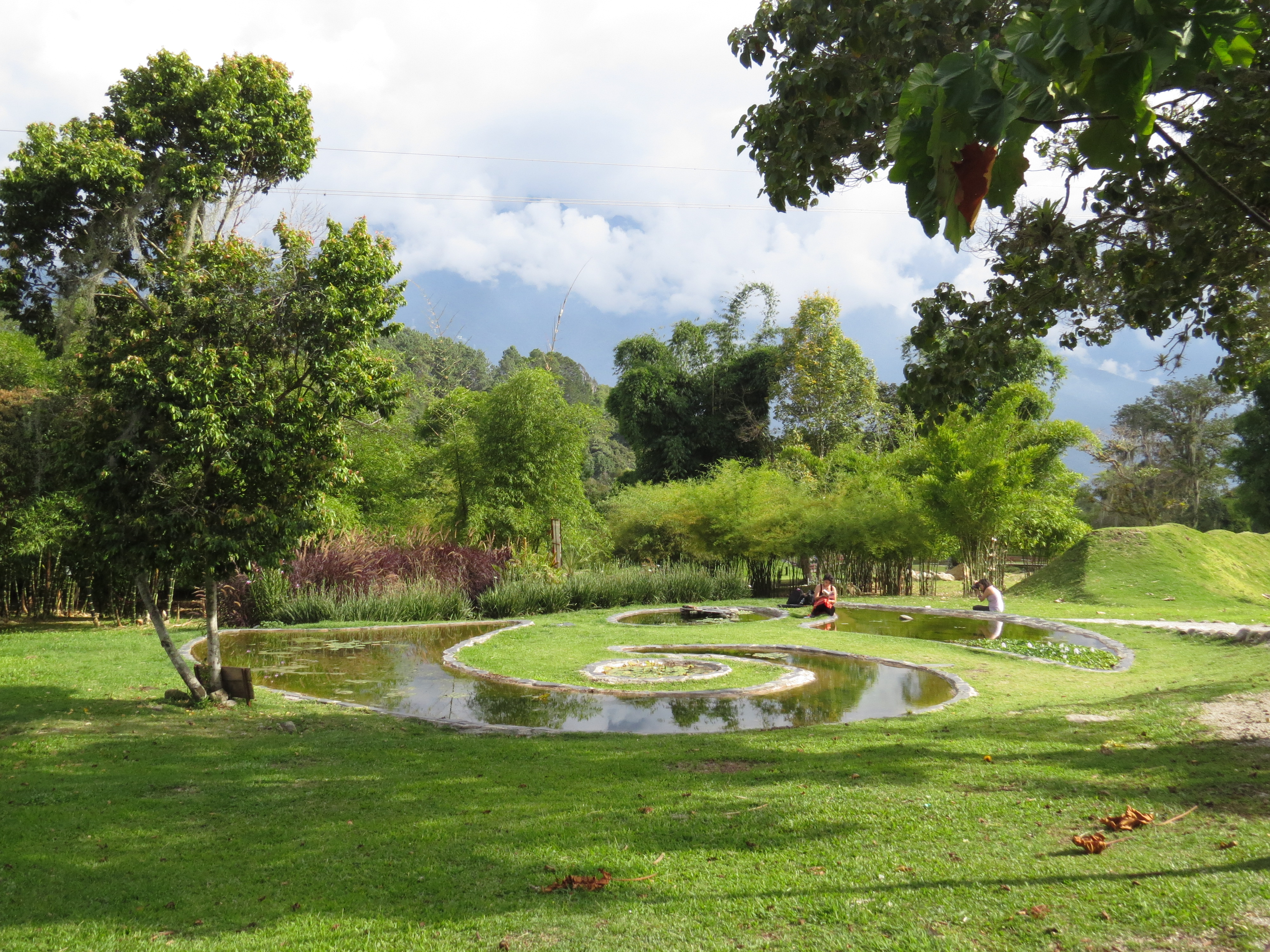
- Interactive map of Botanical Garden of Mérida
- Type: Botanical garden
- Location: Avenida Alberto Carnevali, Mérida, Venezuela
- Coordinates: 8°37′33″N 71°08′36″W
- Area: 44 hectares (110 acres)
- Opened: December 8, 1992
- Operator: University of the Andes
- Website: www.ciens.ula.ve/jardinbotanico

The Botanical Garden of Mérida (Spanish: Centro Jardín Botánico de Mérida) is a botanical garden in the city of Mérida in Venezuela. It was founded in 1991 by the University of the Andes, which is based in Mérida, in order to promote conservation and research in relation to the fauna and flora of the Venezuelan Andes. The garden was opened to the public on December 8, 2002.

It occupies an area of 44 hectares, donated by the university for its development. It is divided into zones according to the type of flora encountered. Most of the area is occupied by a forest of native pines. The most important collection of the garden consists of bromelias, which are present in more than 100 species and 600 individuals: it is the largest collection of bromelias in Venezuela and South America.

== Physical characteristics ==
The Botanical Garden of Mérida is located on the southeast side of the mountains of the Sierra Nevada de Mérida, in a hilly region where the relief varies between areas with steep slopes, areas with a gentle slope and a plateau of about three hectares. The botanical garden elevation hovers around 1,800 meters (5,900 ft) above sea level and average annual rainfall is 1400 mm.

The soil is gray and acidic. It has a low content of organic matter but it is high in exchangeable aluminum, influenced by alluvial contributions from a creek that runs through the park and colluvial deposition from the upper parts of the páramo. The surface layer is covered by a sequence of quartz sandstones, thick, with interbedded siltstone and sandstone of a reddish color.

Delineations of soil map units defined with five units of which Gaia (48.8%) and Ga (34.5%) occupy 78.3% of the botanical garden area.

== Gallery ==
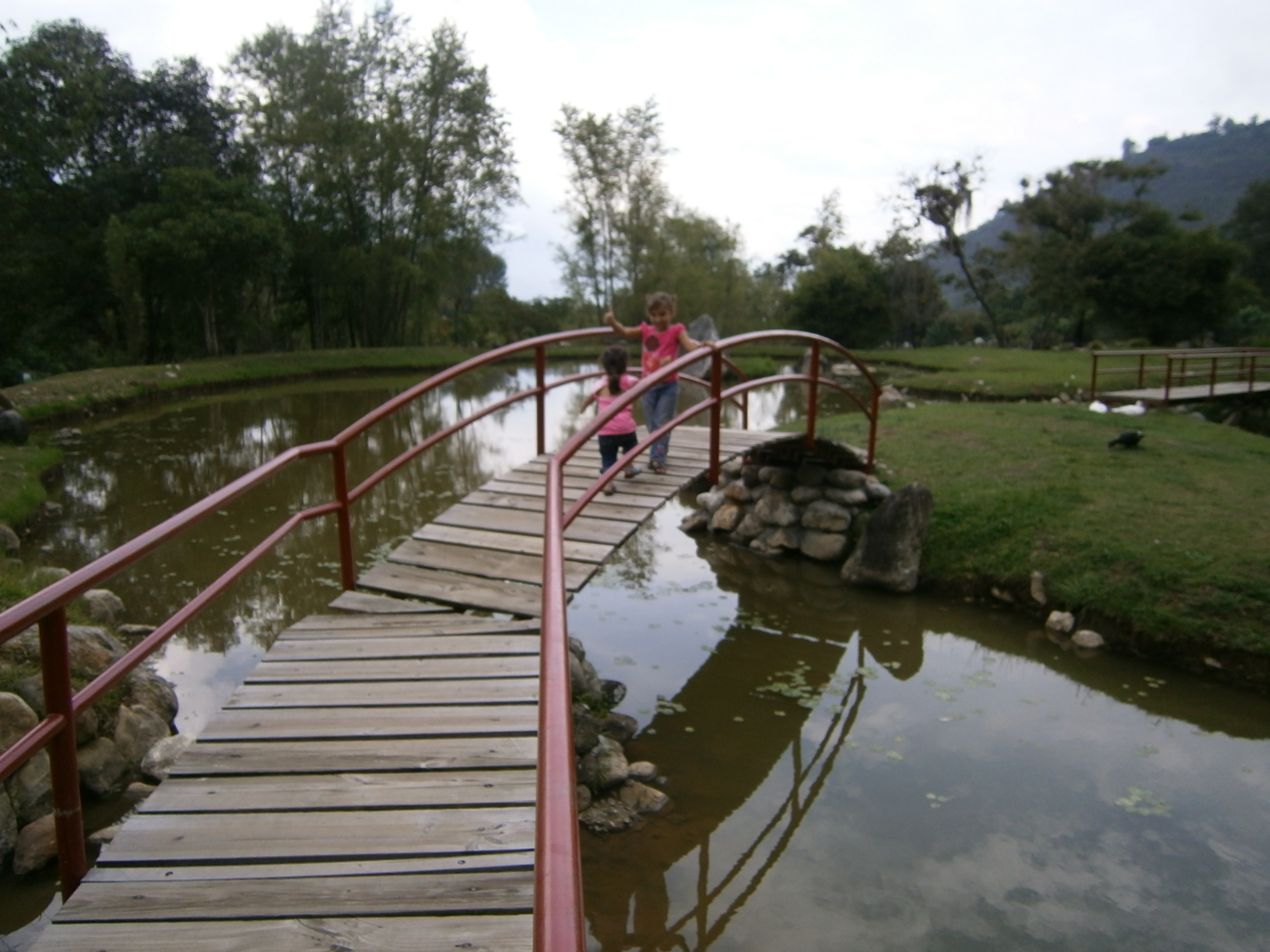

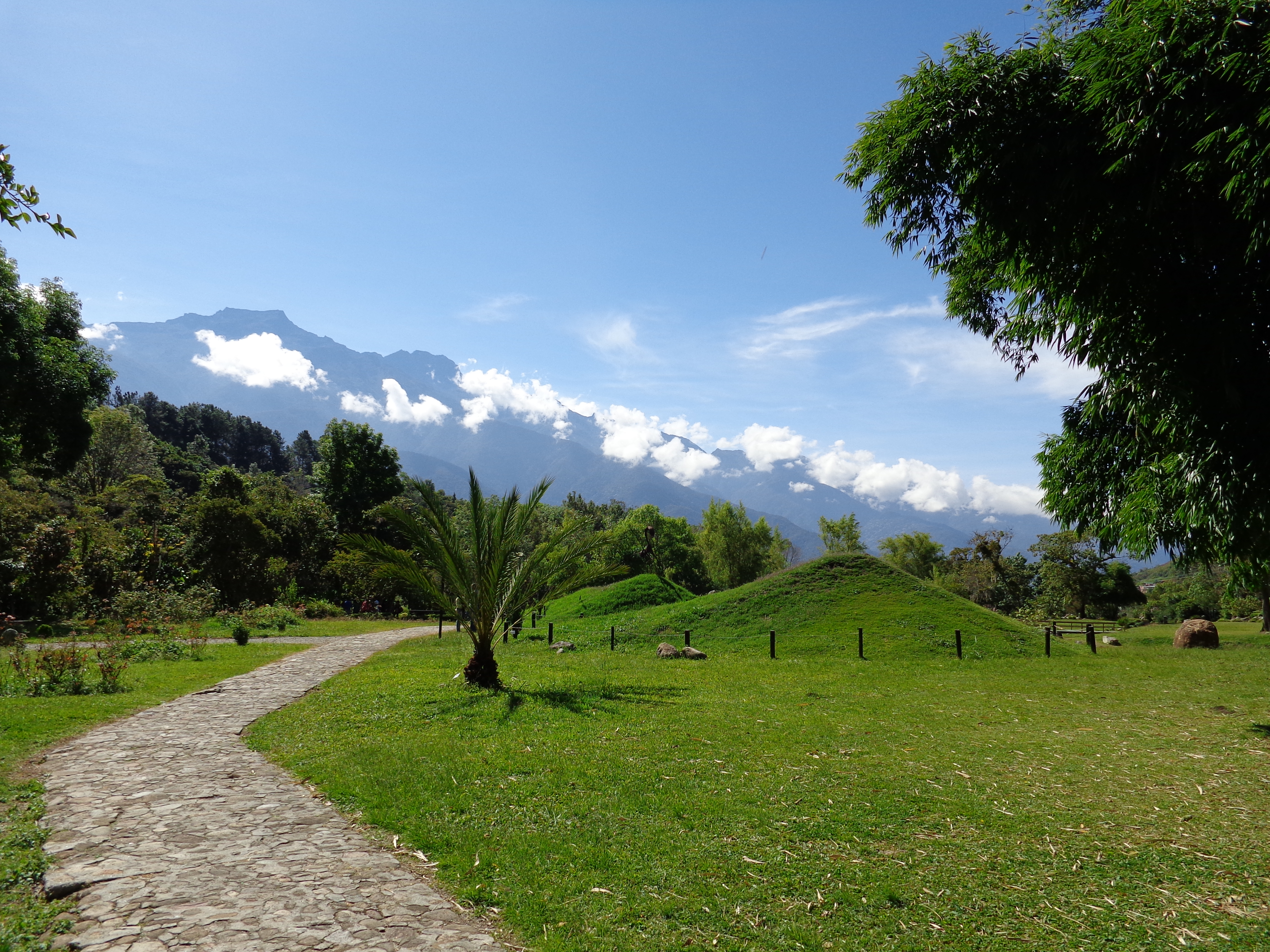

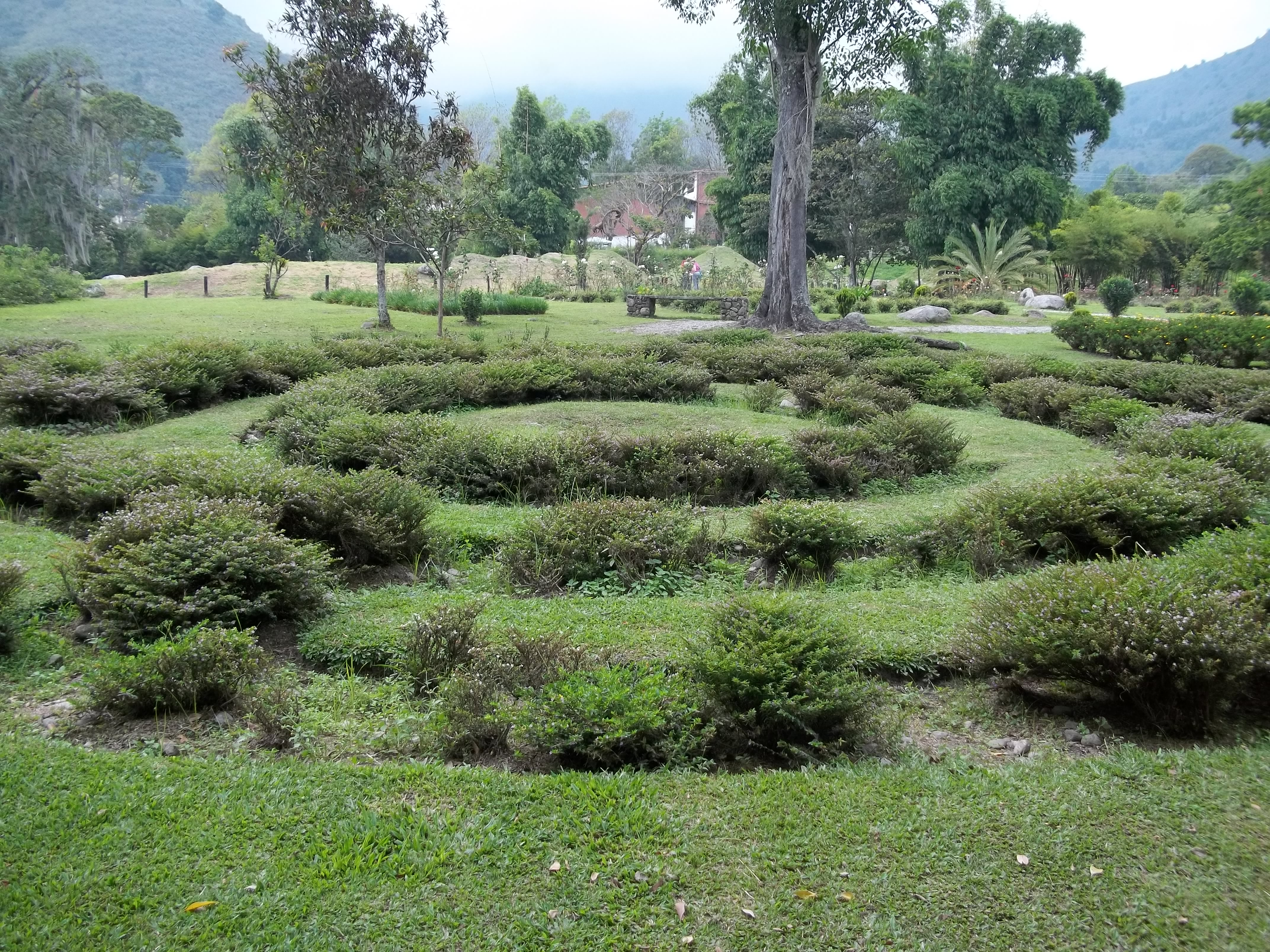

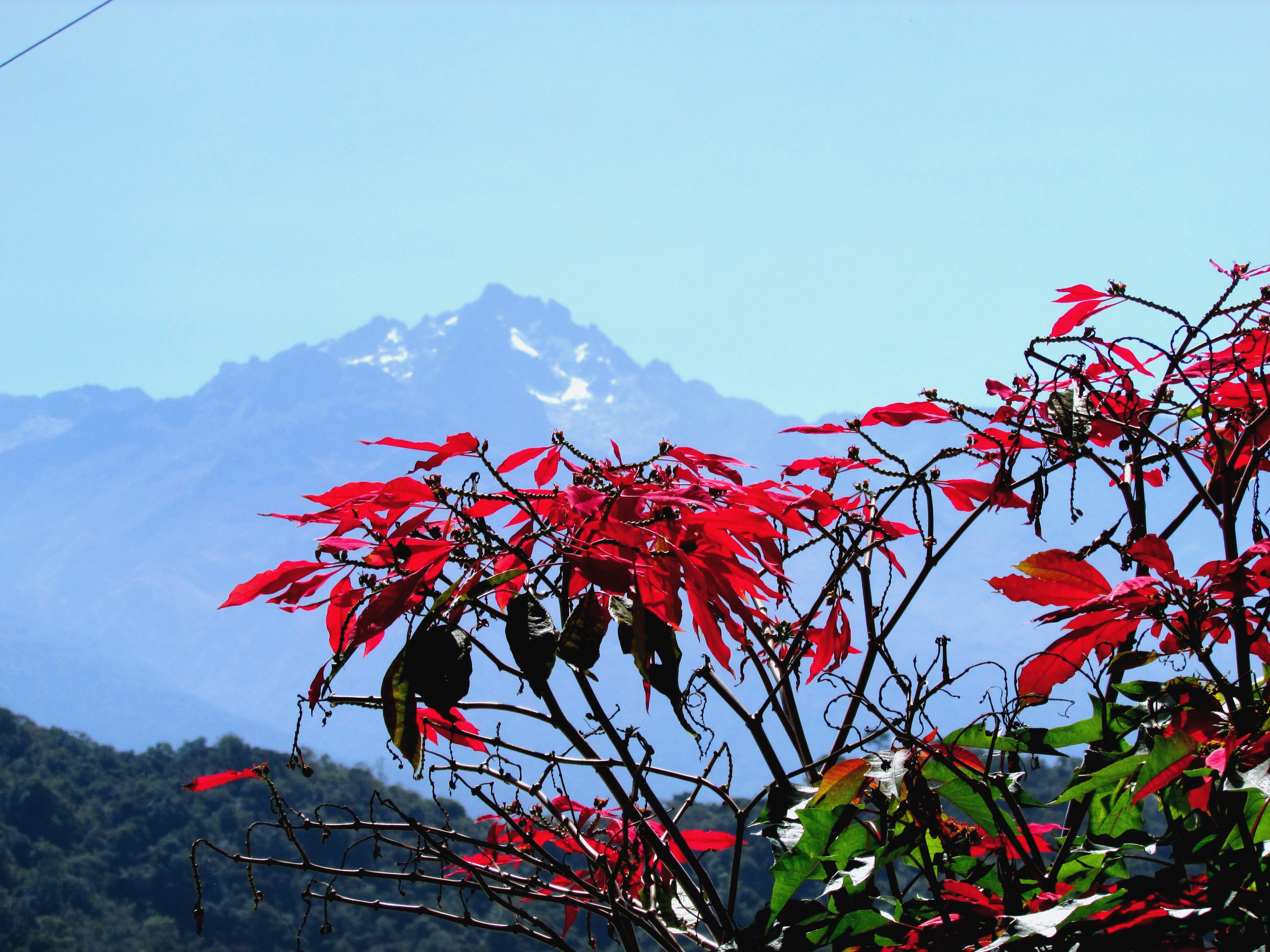

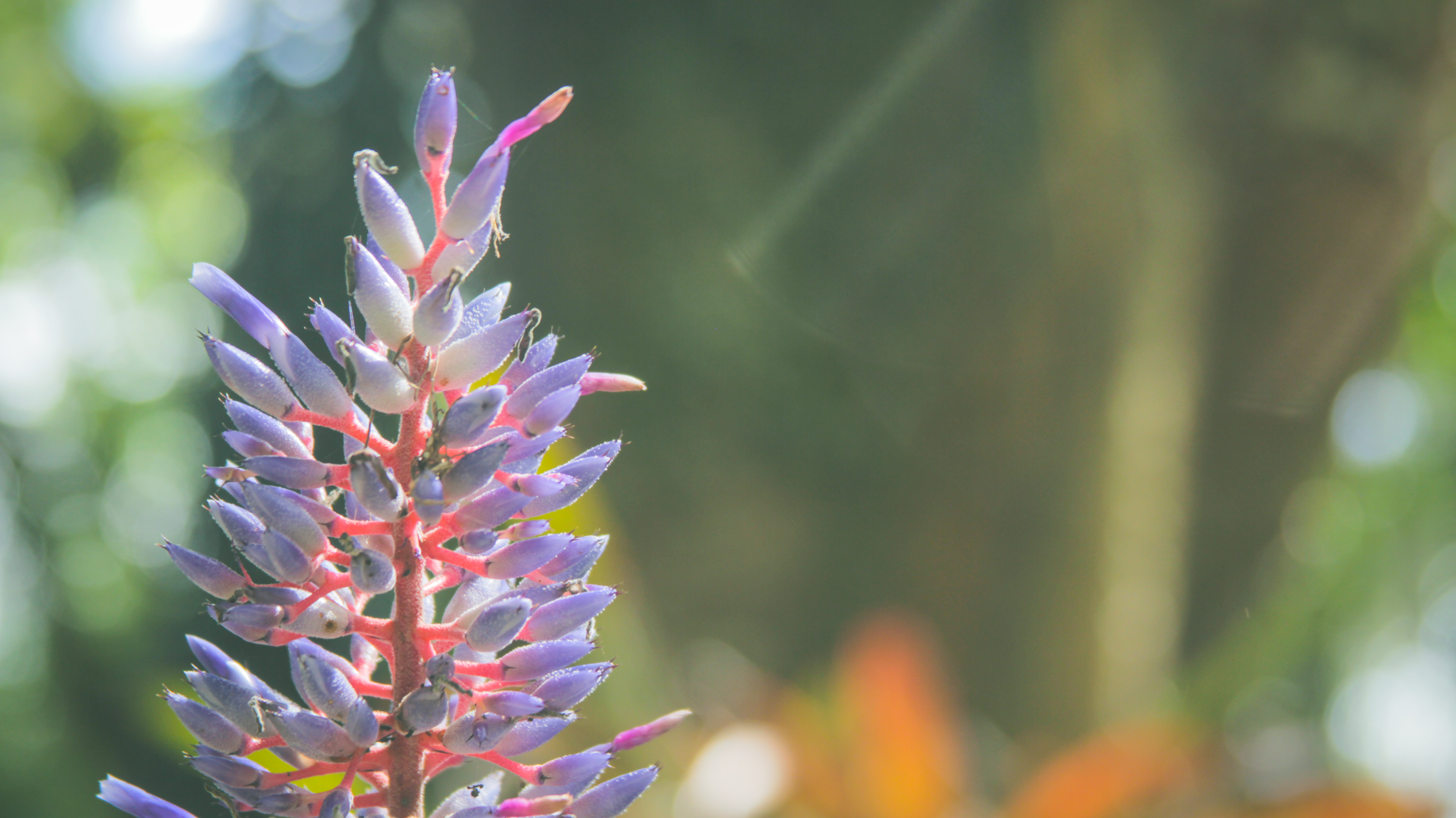
