= Maturín Municipality =

Maturín Municipality Municipio Maturín
- Municipality
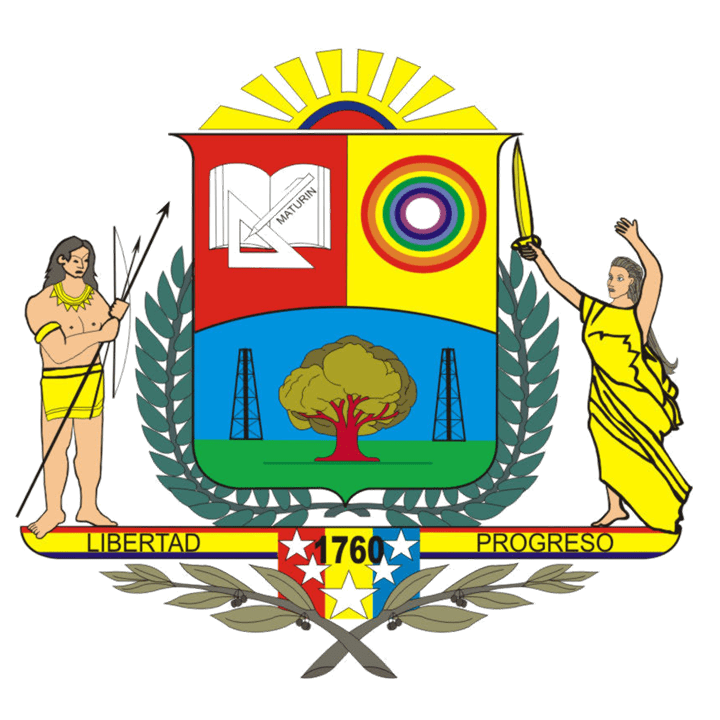
- Flag Coat of arms

- Location in Monagas

- Location in Venezuela
- Coordinates: 9°30′12″N 62°56′07″W
- Country: Venezuela
- State: Monagas
- Municipal seat: Maturín

Government
  - Mayor: Ana Fuentes (PSUV)

Area
  - Total: 12,827.7 km^{2} (4,952.8 sq mi)
- Time zone: UTC−4 (VET)

Maturín is one of the 13 municipalities of the state of Monagas, Venezuela. The municipality's capital is Maturín.

== History ==
On April 28, 1856, created the Maturín Canton (present Municipality Maturín). The Municipality Maturín is created by the Law of Political - Territorial Division of the Monagas State on 3 August 1983. On August 25, 2016, they issued an arrest warrant from the government against Maturín Mayor, Warner Jiménez. On September 9, Antonio Goncalves is assigned as mayor in charge of the Municipality Maturín. On September 29 of the same year, Wilfredo Ordaz is assigned as mayor in charge of the Municipality Maturín.

== Geography ==
The municipality occupies a plains plain in most of its territory. The vegetation is of tropical dry forest, with temperatures between 27 °C and 28 °C and an average precipitation per year of 1,298 mm.

== Economy ==
It is the main economic center of Monagas state. Commercial and service activities are concentrated mainly in the capital of the municipality. The oil activity, in the areas of El Furrial and Jusepín.

== Culture ==
=== Public holidays ===
Carnivals: On February or March.

== Politics and government ==
=== Mayors ===
- José Maicavares. (2008 - 2013) PSUV.
- Warner Jiménez. (2013 - 2016) MUD.
- Wilfredo Ordaz. (2016 - 2017)(2017 - 2021) PSUV.
- Ana Fuentes. (2021–present) PSUV.
