= National Integrated Service for the Administration of Customs Duties and Taxes =

- Servicio Nacional Integrado de Administración Aduanera y Tributaria
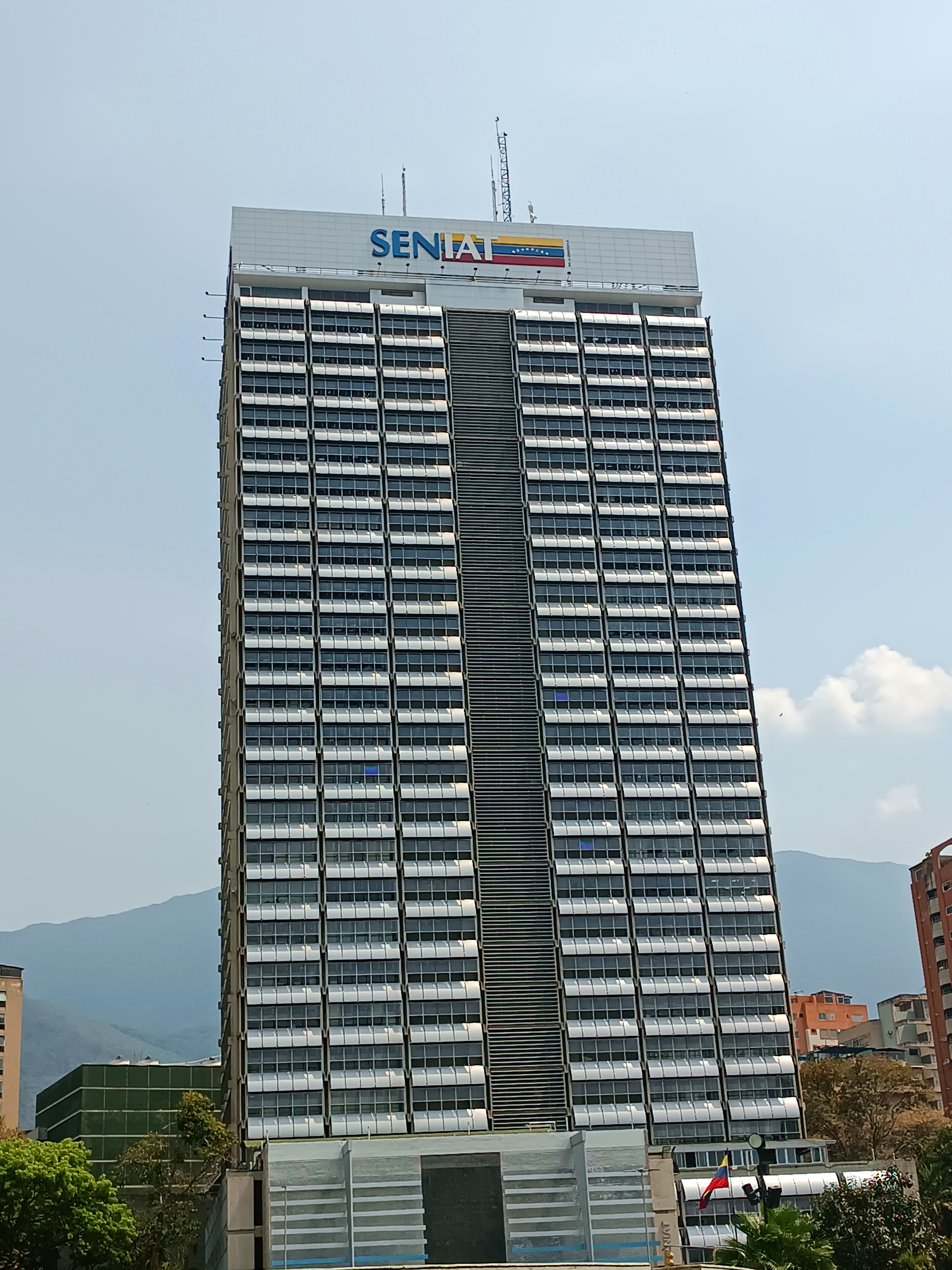

Agency overview
- Formed: August 10, 1994; 32 years ago
- Headquarters: Caracas, Venezuela
- Agency executive: Román Maniglia, Director
- Parent department: Ministry of Economy and Finance
- Website: https://declaraciones.seniat.gob.ve

SENIAT (Servicio Nacional Integrado de Administración Aduanera y Tributaria–- National Integrated Service for the Administration of Customs Duties and Taxes) is Venezuela's revenue service.

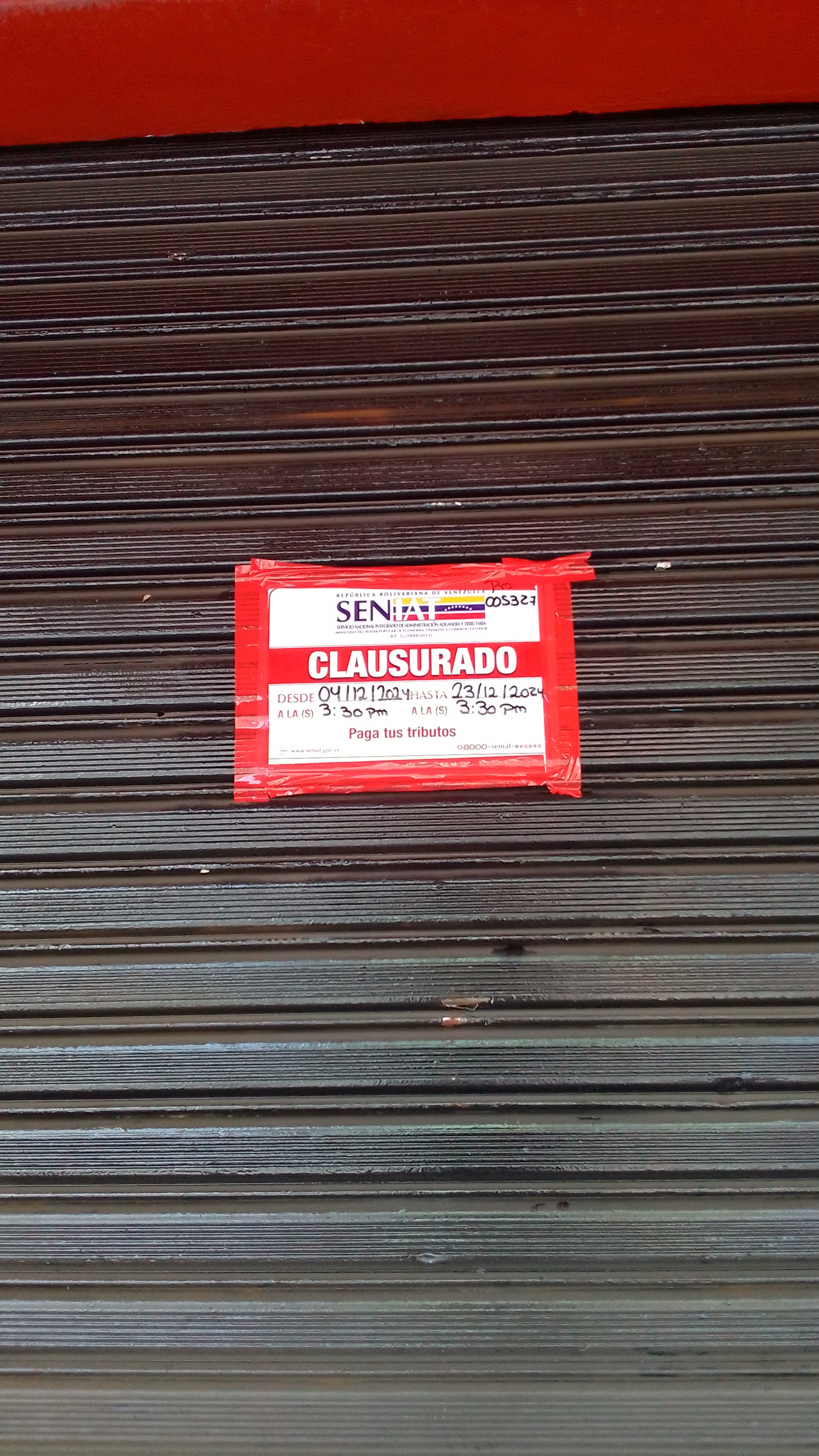
A business forcibly closed by the SENIAT for being in arrears with its taxes
