= 1999 Constituent National Assembly of Venezuela =

Constitutional convention in Venezuela

Constituent National Assembly Asamblea Nacional Constituyente

Type
- Type: Constituent assembly

History
- Succeeded by: 2017 Constituent Assembly

Leadership
- President: Luis Miquilena

Structure
- Seats: 131
- Political groups: Government: Patriotic Pole (121); Indigenous (3); Opposition: Democratic Pole (4); Other parties (3)

Meeting place
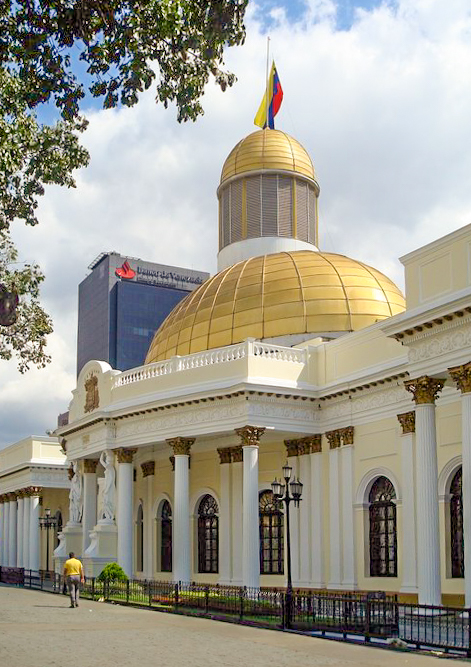
- Federal Legislative Palace, Caracas

The Constituent National Assembly (Spanish: Asamblea Nacional Constituyente) or ANC was a constitutional convention held in Venezuela in 1999 to draft a new Constitution of Venezuela, but the assembly also gave itself the role of a supreme power above all the existing institutions in the republic. The Assembly was endorsed by a referendum in April 1999 which enabled Constituent Assembly elections in July 1999. Three seats were reserved for indigenous delegates in the 131-member constitutional assembly, and two additional indigenous delegates won unreserved seats in the assembly elections.

The constitution was later endorsed by the referendum in December 1999, and new general elections were held under the new constitution in July 2000. This ended the bipartisanship and ushered in the Bolivarian Revolution.

== Background ==
President Chávez called for a public referendum which he hoped would support his plans to form a constitutional assembly, composed of representatives from across Venezuela, as well as from indigenous tribal groups, which would be able to rewrite the nation's constitution. The referendum went ahead on 25 April 1999, and was an overwhelming success for Chávez, with 88% of voters supporting the proposal. Following this, Chávez called for an election to take place on 25 July 1999, in which the members of the constitutional assembly would be voted into power" Critics feared it was the final step to establishing a one-man dictatorship."

Former president and Chávez's predecessor Rafael Caldera protested against the constituent assembly, arguing that it violated the 1961 Constitution. Allan Brewer-Carías, a Venezuelan legal scholar and elected member of this assembly, explains that the constitution-making body was an instrument for the gradual dismantling of democratic institutions and values.

Of the 1,171 candidates standing for election to the assembly, over 900 of them were opponents of Chávez. Chávez's supporters won 52% of the vote; despite this, because of voting procedures chosen by the government beforehand, supporters of the new government took 125 seats (95% of the total), including all of those belonging to indigenous tribal groups, whereas the opposition obtained only 6 seats. One of the 6 seats was occupied by Allan Brewer-Carías, a constitutional scholar and vocal critic.

The 131 member assembly was composed of 121 belonging to the Chávez's Patriotic Pole, which consisted of the Fifth Republic Movement, Movement for Socialism, Fatherland for All, the Communist Party of Venezuela, People's Electoral Movement and others, 3 indigenous representatives and 6 Democratic Pole and other party members consisting of Acción Democrática, Copei, Project Venezuela and National Convergence.

== Constituent Assembly ==
The Assembly convened 3 August 1999. On 12 August 1999, the new constitutional assembly voted to give themselves the power to abolish government institutions and to dismiss officials who were perceived as being corrupt or operating only in their own interests. Chávez and his supporters had discussed dissolving both the Supreme Court and the Congress. The constitutional assembly had the power to perform such an action, and had already fired almost sixty judges whom it accused as being involved in corruption. The ANC also offered more power to Chávez, it helped him broaden the powers given to the president, and allowed him to call a general election for all public office positions —many of which weren't controlled at the time by Chávez or the Movimiento Quinta República. Soto believes that the ANC enabled Chávez to "design a genius political strategy to take over all the spaces in the Venezuelan State."

Although the Chavismo obtained near absolute control of the Constituent Assembly, it did not mean that Chávez did not find opposition within his own supporters to several of his proposals for the new Constitution. There were several important changes pushed by Chávez which had initially been discarded by the Constituent Assembly, and which were only admitted under direct pressure from the President. Among the main ones were the inclusion of the term "Bolivarian" in the official name of Venezuela, the suppression of the voting "second round" or ballot, and the restriction of the taxing powers of the states.

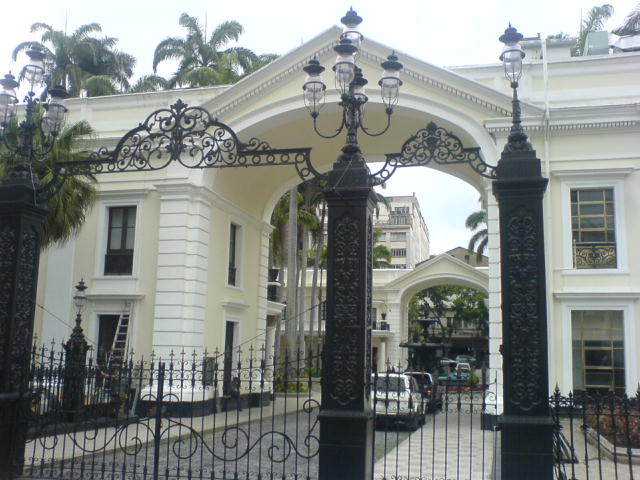
The clashes at the Federal Legislative Palace (pictured) was one of the first conflicts between Chavistas and opponents, which took place on 27 August 1999, after the National Constituent Assembly, controlled by the ruling party, occupied the building, seat of the Venezuelan Congress, controlled by the opposition.

On 25 August, the conflict between the Constituent Assembly and the Congress openly broke out. Taking advantage of a parliamentary recess, the pro-government constituent majority occupied the Federal Legislative Palace, suspended the sessions of the Congress, reduced its commissions to a minimum and created a delegated commission made up of 23 congressmen who could legislate, but always subject to the veto of the Constituent Assembly in important matters. Congressmen from Democratic Action, Copei and Project Venezuela protested the measure, which they called a coup d'état, and called for an emergency session in the Federal Palace. Aristóbulo Istúriz, president of the Constituent Assembly warned them that "the people would shut them down" if they tried to do so. On 27 August, opposition congressmen tried to enter the Congress but were repelled by Chavista sympathizers, who injured thirty of the first ones when they tried to jump over the fence surrounding the building.

The Catholic Church mediated between the Constituent Assembly and the Congress, but although they managed to reach an agreement, the Congress continued to be reduced to its new role of delegated commission, sharing the building with the Constituent. At the time, public opinion interpreted the congressional protests as vain attempts by the discredited traditional political class to stop the changes. At the same time that the Constituent Assembly minimized the Congress, it also created an "emergency commission" to reorganize the Judicial Power. Due to a sentence issued by the Supreme Court at the beginning of the year, the Constituent Assembly could do so as the "original power". The decision was challenged, but when Cecilia Sosa, the president of the high court, resigned after realizing that her colleagues were going to ratify the January decision, as she considered that the rule of law was being violated with the decision:

I believe that by complying with the decree of the National Constituent Assembly that establishes the judicial emergency, the Supreme Court dissolves itself (...) Simply put, the Supreme Court of Justice of Venezuela committed suicide to avoid being assassinated. The result is the same, it is dead.

— Cecilia Sosa, president of the Supreme Court of Venezuela

Although in theory the Constituent Assembly also had the power to intervene the executive branch, the presidential powers, governors and mayors were left untouched, although the Fatherland For All party, then part of the ruling party, considered he idea of removing three opposition governors using the constituent power. For his part, Chávez did not oppose to be ratified by the body, and was sworn in again before the Constituent.

After over three months of work, the Constituent presented its draft constitution on 19 November, which was only opposed by four constituents: Claudio Fermín, Alberto Franceschi, Jorge Olavarría and Virgilio Ávila Vivas, who argued that power was being centralized and that a military estate was going to be formed. A referendum was then called for 15 December in order to approve or reject the text. Democratic Action, Copei, Justice First, Project Venezuela and Fedecamaras campaigned against the approval of the Constitution. Although these forces agreed that a new Magna Carta was necessary in general, they were in complete disagreement with the result, where their representation had been symbolic. The draft was approved in the referendum in December 1999.

== Constitutional changes ==
The new constitution increased the presidential term from five to six years, allowed people to recall presidents by referendum, and added a new presidential two-term limit. It converted the bicameral legislature which consisted of a Congress with both a Senate and a Chamber of Deputies into a unicameral one that consisted only of a National Assembly. As a part of the new constitution, the country, which was then officially known as the Republic of Venezuela, was renamed the Bolivarian Republic of Venezuela (República Bolivariana de Venezuela) at Chávez's request.

It also included increased protections for indigenous peoples and women, and established the rights of the public to education, housing, healthcare and food. It added new environmental protections, and increased requirements for government transparency. Ultimately the constitutional process produced "the region's most progressive indigenous rights regime". Innovations included Article 125's guarantee of political representation at all levels of government, and Article 124's prohibition on "the registration of patents related to indigenous genetic resources or intellectual property associated with indigenous knowledge." The new constitution followed the example of Colombia in reserving parliamentary seats for indigenous delegates (three in Venezuela's National Assembly); and it was the first Latin American constitution to reserve indigenous seats in state assemblies and municipal councils in districts with indigenous population.

== Notable Assembly members ==
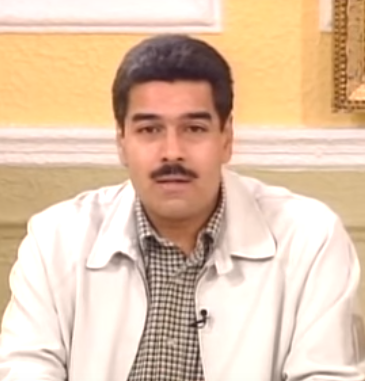
Nicolás Maduro

- Luis Miquilena (President)
- Ronald Blanco La Cruz
- José Gregorio Briceño
- Claudio Fermín
- Willian Lara
- Nicolás Maduro
- Alfredo Peña
- Marisabel Rodríguez de Chávez
- Tarek William Saab
- Allan Brewer-Carías

== See also ==
- April 1999 Venezuelan constitutional referendum
- 1999 Venezuelan Constituent Assembly election
- December 1999 Venezuelan constitutional referendum
- 2017 Constituent Assembly of Venezuela
- Democratic backsliding
