= 2000 Venezuelan general election =

- 30 July 2000
- Presidential election
- Registered: 11,720,660
- Turnout: 56.63% (▼6.82pp)
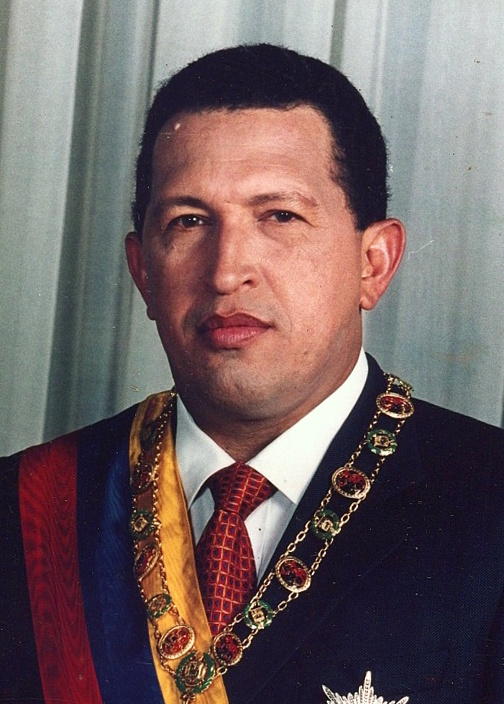

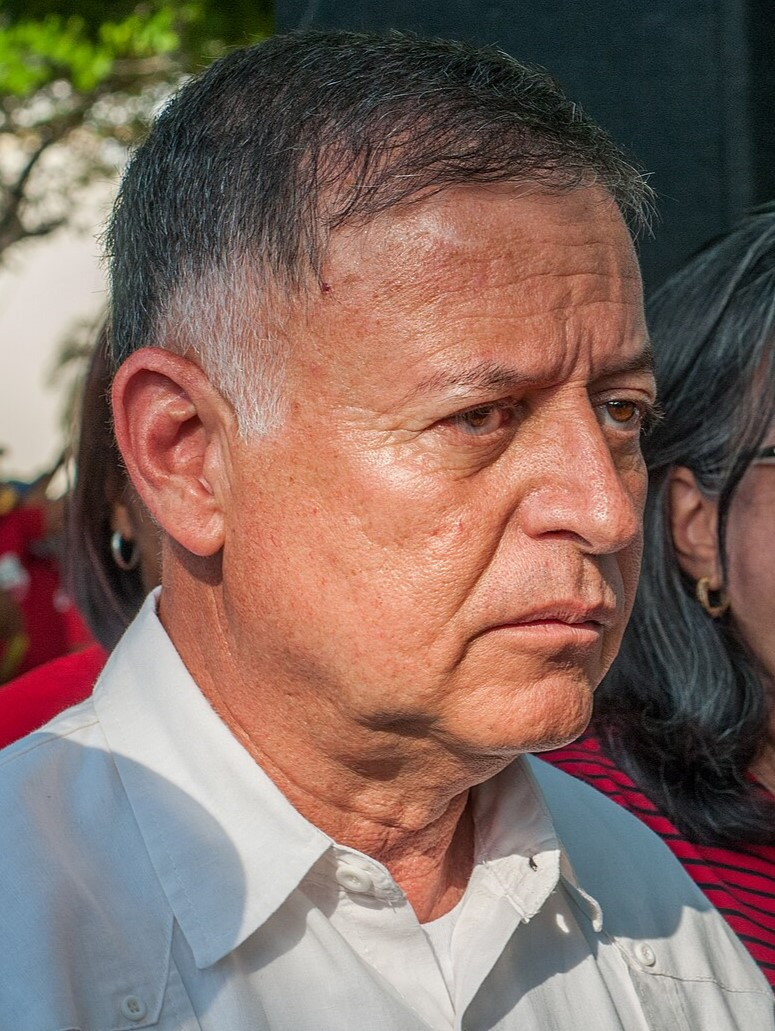
| Nominee | Hugo Chávez | Francisco Arias Cárdenas |
| Party | MVR | LCR |
| Popular vote | 3,757,773 | 2,359,459 |
| Percentage | 59.76% | 37.52% |
- Results by state
President before election
Hugo Chávez
PSUV
Elected President
Hugo Chávez
PSUV
- Legislative election
- 30 July 2000
- All 165 seats in the National Assembly; 83 seats needed for a majority
- Turnout: 56.03%
| Party | Leader | Vote % | Seats |
|---|---|---|---|
| MVR | Hugo Chávez | 44.38 | 92 |
| Democratic Action | Henry Ramos Allup | 16.11 | 33 |
| PROVE | Henrique Salas Römer | 6.94 | 6 |
| COPEI | Luis Ignacio Planas | 5.10 | 6 |
| MAS | Felipe Mujica | 5.03 | 6 |
| LCR | Andrés Velásquez | 4.41 | 3 |
| PJ | Henrique Capriles | 2.47 | 5 |
| PPT | José Albornoz | 2.27 | 1 |
| UNT | Manuel Rosales | 1.75 | 3 |
| Convergence | Eduardo Lapi | 1.07 | 4 |
| MIGATO | José Gregorio Briceño | 0.47 | 1 |
| PUAMA | | 0.04 | 1 |
| MD | | 0.01 | 1 |
| Indigenous | – | – | 3 |
This lists parties that won seats. See the complete results below.
Results by constituency and party-list vote by state

General elections were held in Venezuela on 30 July 2000, the first under the country's newly adopted 1999 constitution. Incumbent President Hugo Chávez ran for election for a full six-year term under the new constitution. He was challenged by another leftist and former ally, Zulia Governor Francisco Arias Cárdenas. Chávez won the election with almost 60% of the popular vote, increasing his vote share over the previous elections and managing to carry a larger number of states. Arias Cárdenas only managed to narrowly carry his home state of Zulia.

== Background ==
The elections were for all popularly elected positions at different levels of government, which numbered more than six thousand. Venezuela was going through economic problems: although the price of oil had tripled since Chávez had become president, the economy had shrunk by 7%, unemployment had increased and foreign investors had moved away from the country. However, in spite of these problems and with the traditional political parties weakened, Chavez's reelection was imminent.

The elections were originally scheduled for 28 May, but the directors of the National Electoral Council (CNE), appointed by the Chavista majority in the Constituent Assembly, proved to be inefficient and only two days before the elections were to be held, the Supreme Court of Justice suspended the vote as the Electoral Council was not ready yet. Arias Cárdenas called his supporters to gather in front of the CNE to protest, but they were repelled by a group of Chavistas.

== Presidential candidates ==
Only two politicians, Antonio Ledezma and Claudio Fermín, both former members of Democratic Action and former mayors of the Libertador Municipality of Caracas, made public their intentions to run against Chávez, both independently. Unexpectedly, in mid-February 2000, Chávez allies Francisco Arias Cárdenas, Jesús Urdaneta and Joel Acosta Chirinos; made a public statement giving Chávez an ultimatum to imprison some members of his government, claiming they had irrefutable evidence proving their corruption, including the president of the legislative power, Luis Miquilena, and foreign affairs minister José Vicente Rangel. Chávez responded by criticizing his former colleagues, whom he reproached for "not having washed the rags at home".

On 15 March Arias Cárdenas, supported by Urdaneta and Acosta Chirinos, registered his candidacy for the presidential election. Upon learning of this, Ledezma withdrew his but Fermin did not. Miquilena's response was to qualify as "trash" those who abandoned Chávez to support Arias Cárdenas. The new opposition leader received support from La Causa R and a handful of small leftist parties, although not from Democratic Action and Copei. Even though some analysts considered Arias Cardenas more pragmatic than Chávez, others such as Eleazar Díaz Rangel declared that they were basically the same.

== Electoral system ==
Representatives in the National Assembly were elected under a mixed member proportional representation, with 60% elected from single seat districts and the remainder by closed party lists.

== Results ==
=== President ===
| Candidate | Party | Votes | % |
|---|---|---|---|
| Hugo Chávez | Fifth Republic Movement | 3,757,773 | 59.76 |
| Francisco Arias Cárdenas | Radical Cause | 2,359,459 | 37.52 |
| Claudio Fermín | National Encounter | 171,346 | 2.72 |
| Total | | 6,288,578 | 100.00 |
| Valid votes | | 6,288,578 | 94.75 |
| Invalid/blank votes | | 348,698 | 5.25 |
| Total votes | | 6,637,276 | 100.00 |
| Registered voters/turnout | | 11,720,660 | 56.63 |
Source: CNE

=== National Assembly ===
| Party | Party-list | | | Constituency | | | Total seats |
| Party | Votes | % | Seats | Votes | % | Seats | Total seats |
|---|---|---|---|---|---|---|---|
| Fifth Republic Movement | 1,977,992 | 44.38 | 22 | 2,225,770 | 43.92 | 70 | 92 |
| Democratic Action | 718,148 | 16.11 | 19 | 811,540 | 16.01 | 14 | 33 |
| Project Venezuela | 309,168 | 6.94 | 6 | 279,191 | 5.51 | 0 | 6 |
| Copei | 227,349 | 5.10 | 3 | 230,989 | 4.56 | 3 | 6 |
| Movement for Socialism | 224,170 | 5.03 | 4 | 261,017 | 5.15 | 2 | 6 |
| Radical Cause | 196,787 | 4.41 | 3 | 198,895 | 3.92 | 0 | 3 |
| Justice First | 109,900 | 2.47 | 2 | 131,425 | 2.59 | 3 | 5 |
| Fatherland for All | 101,246 | 2.27 | 0 | 99,737 | 1.97 | 1 | 1 |
| A New Era | 78,109 | 1.75 | 3 | 201,181 | 3.97 | 0 | 3 |
| Fearless People's Alliance | 49,218 | 1.10 | 0 | 47,435 | 0.94 | 0 | 0 |
| Voters of Miranda | 48,291 | 1.08 | 0 | 62,909 | 1.24 | 0 | 0 |
| Convergence | 47,620 | 1.07 | 1 | 2,706 | 0.05 | 0 | 1 |
| Democratic Left | 37,230 | 0.84 | 0 | 35,988 | 0.71 | 0 | 0 |
| National Encounter | 37,036 | 0.83 | 0 | 22,640 | 0.45 | 0 | 0 |
| United for Human Rights | 33,669 | 0.76 | 0 | 10,426 | 0.21 | 0 | 0 |
| Movement for Direct Democracy | 21,589 | 0.48 | 0 | 29,555 | 0.58 | 0 | 0 |
| MIGATO | 21,044 | 0.47 | 1 | 25,217 | 0.50 | 0 | 1 |
| Communist Party of Venezuela | 15,997 | 0.36 | 0 | 19,129 | 0.38 | 0 | 0 |
| Independent Solidarity | 15,272 | 0.34 | 0 | 11,825 | 0.23 | 0 | 0 |
| Red Flag Party | 14,273 | 0.32 | 0 | 7,858 | 0.16 | 0 | 0 |
| National Integration Movement | 11,234 | 0.25 | 0 | 8,335 | 0.16 | 0 | 0 |
| Organisation Force in Motion | 10,547 | 0.24 | 0 | 23,040 | 0.45 | 0 | 0 |
| Formula 1 | 10,163 | 0.23 | 0 | | | | 0 |
| Caroni Decides | 8,788 | 0.20 | 0 | 15,437 | 0.30 | 0 | 0 |
| Independents for National Community | 7,760 | 0.17 | 0 | 4,807 | 0.09 | 0 | 0 |
| FCT | 6,869 | 0.15 | 0 | 3,354 | 0.07 | 0 | 0 |
| Builders of a Country | 6,259 | 0.14 | 0 | 20,569 | 0.41 | 0 | 0 |
| Emerging People | 5,044 | 0.11 | 0 | 6,715 | 0.13 | 0 | 0 |
| New Democratic Regime | 4,403 | 0.10 | 0 | 5,568 | 0.11 | 0 | 0 |
| Organised Renovation And Emerging Group | 4,050 | 0.09 | 0 | | | | 0 |
| Revolutionary Apureño Movement | 3,952 | 0.09 | 0 | 4,172 | 0.08 | 0 | 0 |
| People's Electoral Movement | 3,738 | 0.08 | 0 | 2,804 | 0.06 | 0 | 0 |
| Social Democratic Alliance | 3,173 | 0.07 | 0 | 1,780 | 0.04 | 0 | 0 |
| Advanced Regional Movement | 2,939 | 0.07 | 0 | 2,935 | 0.06 | 0 | 0 |
| Independent Regional Emerging Movement | 2,686 | 0.06 | 0 | 2,632 | 0.05 | 0 | 0 |
| Voluntariado | 2,643 | 0.06 | 0 | 2,372 | 0.05 | 0 | 0 |
| Democratic Republican Union | 2,641 | 0.06 | 0 | 3,511 | 0.07 | 0 | 0 |
| Acijusta | 2,561 | 0.06 | 0 | 2,929 | 0.06 | 0 | 0 |
| Communities United for Reason and Self-Esteem | 2,493 | 0.06 | 0 | 1,653 | 0.03 | 0 | 0 |
| Trabuco Mirandino | 2,448 | 0.05 | 0 | 4,887 | 0.10 | 0 | 0 |
| Justice Patrol | 2,439 | 0.05 | 0 | 5,087 | 0.10 | 0 | 0 |
| Integration, Representation and New Hope | 2,401 | 0.05 | 0 | 477 | 0.01 | 0 | 0 |
| United for Vargas | 2,348 | 0.05 | 0 | 3,625 | 0.07 | 0 | 0 |
| Ospinero Independent Front for Portuguesa | 2,311 | 0.05 | 0 | 2,255 | 0.04 | 0 | 0 |
| Organised Independent Indigenous Movement | 1,967 | 0.04 | 0 | 1,558 | 0.03 | 0 | 0 |
| United Multi-Ethnic Peoples of Amazonas | 1,837 | 0.04 | 0 | 1,803 | 0.04 | 1 | 1 |
| Out of Love for Venezuela | 1,751 | 0.04 | 0 | 4,562 | 0.09 | 0 | 0 |
| Organised Citizen Option | 1,720 | 0.04 | 0 | 2,569 | 0.05 | 0 | 0 |
| Towards the Good Homeland | 1,683 | 0.04 | 0 | 1,582 | 0.03 | 0 | 0 |
| Social Cause | 1,659 | 0.04 | 0 | 2,371 | 0.05 | 0 | 0 |
| Optimistic People | 1,540 | 0.03 | 0 | 2,734 | 0.05 | 0 | 0 |
| New Insular Generation | 1,509 | 0.03 | 0 | 1,287 | 0.03 | 0 | 0 |
| Renewing Democracy 2000 | 1,505 | 0.03 | 0 | 688 | 0.01 | 0 | 0 |
| Movimiento Civilista Adelante Cojedes | 1,398 | 0.03 | 0 | 1,353 | 0.03 | 0 | 0 |
| Citizens in Action | 1,274 | 0.03 | 0 | 4,115 | 0.08 | 0 | 0 |
| Voluntariado Organizado Zuliano | 1,181 | 0.03 | 0 | 1,341 | 0.03 | 0 | 0 |
| Reto Popular Merideño | 1,112 | 0.02 | 0 | 1,192 | 0.02 | 0 | 0 |
| Authentic Renewal Organization | 1,066 | 0.02 | 0 | 531 | 0.01 | 0 | 0 |
| Comando de Partecipación Comunitaria | 995 | 0.02 | 0 | 1,033 | 0.02 | 0 | 0 |
| National Opinion | 956 | 0.02 | 0 | 1,681 | 0.03 | 0 | 0 |
| Movimiento Patriotico Ciudadano "Yo Existo" | 936 | 0.02 | 0 | 337 | 0.01 | 0 | 0 |
| Vision Social Constituyente | 927 | 0.02 | 0 | 873 | 0.02 | 0 | 0 |
| Apoyo Profesional | 912 | 0.02 | 0 | 1,920 | 0.04 | 0 | 0 |
| Organización Contra el Abuso | 762 | 0.02 | 0 | 395 | 0.01 | 0 | 0 |
| Fuerza Popular | 747 | 0.02 | 0 | 1,286 | 0.03 | 0 | 0 |
| Caricuao Somos Todos | 740 | 0.02 | 0 | 512 | 0.01 | 0 | 0 |
| Depostistas | 711 | 0.02 | 0 | 853 | 0.02 | 0 | 0 |
| Rompe el Silencio | 695 | 0.02 | 0 | 649 | 0.01 | 0 | 0 |
| Movimiento Ecologico para la Vida | 693 | 0.02 | 0 | 452 | 0.01 | 0 | 0 |
| Pueblo Revolucionario al Cambio y Desarrollo Larense | 688 | 0.02 | 0 | 2,047 | 0.04 | 0 | 0 |
| Movimiento Democratico | 687 | 0.02 | 1 | 1,306 | 0.03 | 0 | 1 |
| Fuerza Activa de Partecipación | 635 | 0.01 | 0 | 1,246 | 0.02 | 0 | 0 |
| Partecipación Popular | 590 | 0.01 | 0 | 808 | 0.02 | 0 | 0 |
| Frente Civico de Militantes Zulianos | 576 | 0.01 | 0 | 1,249 | 0.02 | 0 | 0 |
| Movimiento 100 | 567 | 0.01 | 0 | 553 | 0.01 | 0 | 0 |
| Frente Insular Organizado de Electores | 547 | 0.01 | 0 | 229 | 0.00 | 0 | 0 |
| Patriotas Revolucionarios Independientes | 545 | 0.01 | 0 | 227 | 0.00 | 0 | 0 |
| Decision de Portuguesa | 544 | 0.01 | 0 | 532 | 0.01 | 0 | 0 |
| Poder Vecinal | 535 | 0.01 | 0 | 672 | 0.01 | 0 | 0 |
| Movimiento Unitario Real Opcion | 527 | 0.01 | 0 | 512 | 0.01 | 0 | 0 |
| Foro Democratico | 524 | 0.01 | 0 | 1,801 | 0.04 | 0 | 0 |
| Opening for National Participation | 522 | 0.01 | 0 | 1,483 | 0.03 | 0 | 0 |
| Movimiento Republicano | 511 | 0.01 | 0 | 259 | 0.01 | 0 | 0 |
| Guaiqueres en Acción | 509 | 0.01 | 0 | 344 | 0.01 | 0 | 0 |
| Frente Nacionalista Maisanta | 508 | 0.01 | 0 | 159 | 0.00 | 0 | 0 |
| Movimiento De Base Parroquial Zuliano | 508 | 0.01 | 0 | 2,282 | 0.05 | 0 | 0 |
| RC | 472 | 0.01 | 0 | 499 | 0.01 | 0 | 0 |
| TU CAMINO | 457 | 0.01 | 0 | 368 | 0.01 | 0 | 0 |
| ARENA | 455 | 0.01 | 0 | 375 | 0.01 | 0 | 0 |
| MOV 20 | 451 | 0.01 | 0 | 3,067 | 0.06 | 0 | 0 |
| REALCI | 429 | 0.01 | 0 | 112 | 0.00 | 0 | 0 |
| CAMVIO | 403 | 0.01 | 0 | 236 | 0.00 | 0 | 0 |
| FALCONIA | 396 | 0.01 | 0 | 349 | 0.01 | 0 | 0 |
| AR | 386 | 0.01 | 0 | 213 | 0.00 | 0 | 0 |
| DP | 379 | 0.01 | 0 | 318 | 0.01 | 0 | 0 |
| EL | 372 | 0.01 | 0 | 1,850 | 0.04 | 0 | 0 |
| SOLUCION | 370 | 0.01 | 0 | | | | 0 |
| MIAU | 368 | 0.01 | 0 | | | | 0 |
| APD | 363 | 0.01 | 0 | 2,392 | 0.05 | 0 | 0 |
| M2000 | 359 | 0.01 | 0 | 1,053 | 0.02 | 0 | 0 |
| ACTIVE | 356 | 0.01 | 0 | 510 | 0.01 | 0 | 0 |
| VOTAUNIDOS | 351 | 0.01 | 0 | 505 | 0.01 | 0 | 0 |
| CENUREPU | 350 | 0.01 | 0 | | | | 0 |
| PODER MORAL | 341 | 0.01 | 0 | 150 | 0.00 | 0 | 0 |
| G CONDOR | 332 | 0.01 | 0 | 445 | 0.01 | 0 | 0 |
| IPRS | 329 | 0.01 | 0 | 593 | 0.01 | 0 | 0 |
| OPC REG 98 | 327 | 0.01 | 0 | | | | 0 |
| PROY III MELENIO | 322 | 0.01 | 0 | 221 | 0.00 | 0 | 0 |
| MCR 200 | 320 | 0.01 | 0 | | | | 0 |
| FPC | 313 | 0.01 | 0 | 97 | 0.00 | 0 | 0 |
| CON | 312 | 0.01 | 0 | 321 | 0.01 | 0 | 0 |
| MP | 307 | 0.01 | 0 | 203 | 0.00 | 0 | 0 |
| NFG | 289 | 0.01 | 0 | 582 | 0.01 | 0 | 0 |
| PPA | 289 | 0.01 | 0 | 441 | 0.01 | 0 | 0 |
| CON GUARICO | 285 | 0.01 | 0 | 324 | 0.01 | 0 | 0 |
| MDR | 285 | 0.01 | 0 | 540 | 0.01 | 0 | 0 |
| SOID SIGLO XXI | 269 | 0.01 | 0 | 277 | 0.01 | 0 | 0 |
| EL PODER 7 | 261 | 0.01 | 0 | 115 | 0.00 | 0 | 0 |
| TRIPLE C | 256 | 0.01 | 0 | 241 | 0.00 | 0 | 0 |
| IND AL 2000 | 241 | 0.01 | 0 | 49 | 0.00 | 0 | 0 |
| MEV VARGAS | 239 | 0.01 | 0 | 411 | 0.01 | 0 | 0 |
| ASIR | 238 | 0.01 | 0 | 274 | 0.01 | 0 | 0 |
| AB 2000 | 237 | 0.01 | 0 | 8,014 | 0.16 | 0 | 0 |
| IAP | 228 | 0.01 | 0 | 123 | 0.00 | 0 | 0 |
| FT | 223 | 0.01 | 0 | 284 | 0.01 | 0 | 0 |
| VARGAS AL PRO | 223 | 0.01 | 0 | | | | 0 |
| IPV | 216 | 0.00 | 0 | 853 | 0.02 | 0 | 0 |
| VEA | 216 | 0.00 | 0 | | | | 0 |
| BS21 | 214 | 0.00 | 0 | 441 | 0.01 | 0 | 0 |
| MHM | 202 | 0.00 | 0 | 242 | 0.00 | 0 | 0 |
| UVI | 193 | 0.00 | 0 | 233 | 0.00 | 0 | 0 |
| IS | 187 | 0.00 | 0 | 136 | 0.00 | 0 | 0 |
| AMI | 180 | 0.00 | 0 | 89 | 0.00 | 0 | 0 |
| PN | 169 | 0.00 | 0 | 87 | 0.00 | 0 | 0 |
| FRD | 163 | 0.00 | 0 | 83 | 0.00 | 0 | 0 |
| CORDIALIDAD | 144 | 0.00 | 0 | 173 | 0.00 | 0 | 0 |
| POPA | 129 | 0.00 | 0 | 84 | 0.00 | 0 | 0 |
| MOREI 2000 | 116 | 0.00 | 0 | 583 | 0.01 | 0 | 0 |
| VEA | 109 | 0.00 | 0 | | | | 0 |
| T UCLAS | 103 | 0.00 | 0 | | | | 0 |
| MOCI | 101 | 0.00 | 0 | 69 | 0.00 | 0 | 0 |
| MLI | 100 | 0.00 | 0 | 64 | 0.00 | 0 | 0 |
| MRG 2000 | 100 | 0.00 | 0 | 99 | 0.00 | 0 | 0 |
| AV 98 | 94 | 0.00 | 0 | 60 | 0.00 | 0 | 0 |
| CONPACO | 94 | 0.00 | 0 | | | | 0 |
| PACIFICO | 90 | 0.00 | 0 | 107 | 0.00 | 0 | 0 |
| SER | 88 | 0.00 | 0 | | | | 0 |
| POETA | 84 | 0.00 | 0 | 114 | 0.00 | 0 | 0 |
| AI | 80 | 0.00 | 0 | | | | 0 |
| MIO | 77 | 0.00 | 0 | 124 | 0.00 | 0 | 0 |
| INITA | 74 | 0.00 | 0 | 138 | 0.00 | 0 | 0 |
| MIA AMAZONAS | 71 | 0.00 | 0 | 69 | 0.00 | 0 | 0 |
| PM | 71 | 0.00 | 0 | | | | 0 |
| DEPURACION | 70 | 0.00 | 0 | 42 | 0.00 | 0 | 0 |
| FAI | 64 | 0.00 | 0 | 161 | 0.00 | 0 | 0 |
| CFPI | 61 | 0.00 | 0 | 101 | 0.00 | 0 | 0 |
| PCMI | 58 | 0.00 | 0 | 59 | 0.00 | 0 | 0 |
| MJPT | 57 | 0.00 | 0 | 63 | 0.00 | 0 | 0 |
| MUPI | 49 | 0.00 | 0 | 46 | 0.00 | 0 | 0 |
| OPIC | 48 | 0.00 | 0 | 8 | 0.00 | 0 | 0 |
| GIR AMAZONAS | 41 | 0.00 | 0 | 28 | 0.00 | 0 | 0 |
| MOVE | 40 | 0.00 | 0 | 91 | 0.00 | 0 | 0 |
| MU CAMBIO | 39 | 0.00 | 0 | 25 | 0.00 | 0 | 0 |
| DR 2000 | 38 | 0.00 | 0 | 453 | 0.01 | 0 | 0 |
| INCVF | 35 | 0.00 | 0 | 19 | 0.00 | 0 | 0 |
| MOVES 21 | 33 | 0.00 | 0 | 32 | 0.00 | 0 | 0 |
| PARTICIPA | 21 | 0.00 | 0 | | | | 0 |
| MEAI | 13 | 0.00 | 0 | 11 | 0.00 | 0 | 0 |
| MIRA | 8 | 0.00 | 0 | 192 | 0.00 | 0 | 0 |
| TSV | 8 | 0.00 | 0 | | | | 0 |
| CI | 5 | 0.00 | 0 | 8 | 0.00 | 0 | 0 |
| Lo Alcanzado por Yaracuy | | | | 32,831 | 0.65 | 3 | 3 |
| SAN FRANCISCO 2000 | | | | 2,869 | 0.06 | 0 | 0 |
| ASI POPO | | | | 2,685 | 0.05 | 0 | 0 |
| E MIRANDA | | | | 2,388 | 0.05 | 0 | 0 |
| EN | | | | 2,061 | 0.04 | 0 | 0 |
| CRA | | | | 2,049 | 0.04 | 0 | 0 |
| MDP | | | | 1,519 | 0.03 | 0 | 0 |
| MRV | | | | 1,169 | 0.02 | 0 | 0 |
| LA LLAVE | | | | 1,131 | 0.02 | 0 | 0 |
| ICLMA | | | | 879 | 0.02 | 0 | 0 |
| PDI | | | | 785 | 0.02 | 0 | 0 |
| FRAC | | | | 755 | 0.01 | 0 | 0 |
| ARIAZ | | | | 733 | 0.01 | 0 | 0 |
| SUCRE | | | | 667 | 0.01 | 0 | 0 |
| MONCHO | | | | 658 | 0.01 | 0 | 0 |
| MIPREA | | | | 349 | 0.01 | 0 | 0 |
| BPP | | | | 345 | 0.01 | 0 | 0 |
| DJC | | | | 333 | 0.01 | 0 | 0 |
| CH PODER | | | | 302 | 0.01 | 0 | 0 |
| AVANCE SOCIAL | | | | 297 | 0.01 | 0 | 0 |
| OP REG 98 | | | | 294 | 0.01 | 0 | 0 |
| PG | | | | 289 | 0.01 | 0 | 0 |
| AS | | | | 281 | 0.01 | 0 | 0 |
| DE CHACAO 92 | | | | 268 | 0.01 | 0 | 0 |
| SOLVECINAL | | | | 260 | 0.01 | 0 | 0 |
| PGI | | | | 254 | 0.01 | 0 | 0 |
| PY | | | | 243 | 0.00 | 0 | 0 |
| MPI | | | | 233 | 0.00 | 0 | 0 |
| CM | | | | 201 | 0.00 | 0 | 0 |
| MIG | | | | 194 | 0.00 | 0 | 0 |
| TUCLAS | | | | 177 | 0.00 | 0 | 0 |
| VIRA | | | | 172 | 0.00 | 0 | 0 |
| CIMOPACI | | | | 170 | 0.00 | 0 | 0 |
| ORFAL | | | | 162 | 0.00 | 0 | 0 |
| MDPC | | | | 153 | 0.00 | 0 | 0 |
| MFU | | | | 139 | 0.00 | 0 | 0 |
| DEPARA POR CHACAO | | | | 114 | 0.00 | 0 | 0 |
| TUY SIGLO XXI | | | | 105 | 0.00 | 0 | 0 |
| PG 2000 | | | | 104 | 0.00 | 0 | 0 |
| UNIDOS | | | | 97 | 0.00 | 0 | 0 |
| CORDIALIDA | | | | 79 | 0.00 | 0 | 0 |
| JUSTICIA | | | | 78 | 0.00 | 0 | 0 |
| PANA | | | | 56 | 0.00 | 0 | 0 |
| OP | | | | 50 | 0.00 | 0 | 0 |
| FPR | | | | 31 | 0.00 | 0 | 0 |
| FND | | | | 27 | 0.00 | 0 | 0 |
| FRANCIMZUL | | | | 26 | 0.00 | 0 | 0 |
| FUCI | | | | 24 | 0.00 | 0 | 0 |
| FRN | | | | 21 | 0.00 | 0 | 0 |
| VERDAD | | | | 16 | 0.00 | 0 | 0 |
| ACURA | | | | 13 | 0.00 | 0 | 0 |
| MIIDEA | | | | 10 | 0.00 | 0 | 0 |
| FREDEMAC | | | | 5 | 0.00 | 0 | 0 |
| Independent | 2,163 | 0.05 | 0 | 80,403 | 1.59 | 0 | 0 |
| Indigenous seats | | | | | | | 3 |
| Total | 4,457,296 | 100.00 | 65 | 5,068,056 | 100.00 | 97 | 165 |
| Valid votes | 4,457,296 | 67.96 | | 2,181,613 | 33.33 | | |
| Invalid/blank votes | 2,101,850 | 32.04 | | 4,363,985 | 66.67 | | |
| Total votes | 6,559,146 | 100.00 | | 6,545,598 | 100.00 | | |
| Registered voters/turnout | 11,705,702 | 56.03 | | 11,705,702 | 55.92 | | |
Source: CNE

=== Andean Parliament ===
| Party | Votes | % | Seats |
|---|---|---|---|
| Fifth Republic Movement | 1,955,072 | 49.39 | 4 |
| Democratic Action | 617,939 | 15.61 | 1 |
| Project Venezuela | 470,363 | 11.88 | 0 |
| Radical Cause–Izquierda | 321,560 | 8.12 | 0 |
| Copei | 244,988 | 6.19 | 0 |
| Movement for Socialism | 209,347 | 5.29 | 0 |
| Solidaridad Independiente–Independientes por la Comunidad Nacional | 73,855 | 1.87 | 0 |
| Encuentro | 65,174 | 1.65 | 0 |
| Total | 3,958,298 | 100.00 | 5 |
| Valid votes | 3,958,298 | 60.33 | |
| Invalid/blank votes | 2,602,862 | 39.67 | |
| Total votes | 6,561,160 | 100.00 | |
| Registered voters/turnout | 11,720,971 | 55.98 | |
Source: CNE, CNE

=== Latin American Parliament ===
| Party | Votes | % | Seats |
|---|---|---|---|
| Fifth Republic Movement–Solidaridad Independiente–Nuevo Régimen Democrático | 2,132,051 | 50.04 | 8 |
| Democratic Action | 665,556 | 15.62 | 2 |
| Project Venezuela | 477,213 | 11.20 | 1 |
| Radical Cause–Izquierda | 341,432 | 8.01 | 1 |
| Movement for Socialism | 251,629 | 5.91 | 0 |
| Copei | 235,616 | 5.53 | 0 |
| Fearless People's Alliance | 70,545 | 1.66 | 0 |
| Encuentro | 65,472 | 1.54 | 0 |
| Independientes por la Comunidad Nacional | 16,872 | 0.40 | 0 |
| Movimiento Republicano | 4,629 | 0.11 | 0 |
| Total | 4,261,015 | 100.00 | 12 |
| Valid votes | 4,261,015 | 64.98 | |
| Invalid/blank votes | 2,296,089 | 35.02 | |
| Total votes | 6,557,104 | 100.00 | |
| Registered voters/turnout | 11,720,971 | 55.94 | |
Source: CNE, CNE
