= April 1999 Venezuelan constitutional referendum =

Referendum on the National Constituent Assembly

- 25 April 1999

Do you convene a National Constituent Assembly with the purpose of transforming the State and create a new legal system that allows the effective functioning of a social and participatory democracy?
For	92.36%
Against	7.64%

Do you authorize the President of the Republic so that after hearing the opinion of the political, social and economic sectors, the Government Act establishes the bases of an electoral process in which the members of the Constituent Assembly will be elected?
For	86.50%
Against	13.50%
- Results by state

A referendum on convening a Constituent Assembly was held in Venezuela on 25 April 1999. It was promoted by President Hugo Chávez, with voters asked two questions on convening a National Constituent Assembly and how that body should be elected. Both proposals were approved by over 80% of voters.

== Background ==
In the 1998 presidential election campaign Chávez campaigned on replacing the legal system and the constitution of 1961. A National Constituent Assembly would be elected and have powers to draft a new constitution within six months. Once the Assembly was installed, its members would be required to discuss the new structure, principles and articles of the future constitution with all sectors of society. Once the text was approved, revised article by article, the National Constituent Assembly would deliver the draft constitution to the national executive, which would be responsible for convening by decree a second referendum to approve the new constitution.

== Participating parties and organizations ==
Although Chávez had promised to seek the support of the opposition-dominated Congress before starting the process, on his first day as president he called for a referendum to determine whether a new constitution should be drafted using a method he had proposed. According to statements made at the time by the head of the Movement for Socialism parliamentary group, Chávez's main ally in Congress, apparently even they had not been informed of this step beforehand.

Two "poles" formed: the Patriotic Pole supporting the decree and the Democratic Pole opposing it. The Patriotic Pole consisted of the Fifth Republic Movement, the Movement for Socialism, Fatherland for All, the Communist Party of Venezuela, and the People's Electoral Movement.

The opposition was caught divided: Copei, Justice First and former presidential candidate Irene Sáez, who had just formed an alliance with the Chavistas in the Nueva Esparta state, supported the decree, while Henrique Salas Römer's Project Venezuela and Democratic Action (AD) criticized the manner in which Chávez was leading the process, arguing that it excluded Congress. Radical Cause and National Convergence were cautious as they did not know the details of the proposals. Only the Movimiento Apertura of former President Carlos Andrés Pérez was completely opposed to the measure.

The process promoted by Chávez was not set forth in the 1961 constitution, but two favorable decisions of the Supreme Court of Justice in January 1999 paved the way for this proposal. The Supreme Court even ratified Chávez's opinion that since the Constituent Power was an "original power", it should not be subject to the powers established in the current constitution. The National Electoral Council (CNE) gave its approval after reviewing the proposals and the referendum was set for 25 April. Henry Ramos Allup of Democratic Action criticized then the behavior of the bodies, saying that they presented an "obsequious attitude" towards the president.

== Results ==
The referendum was held under a climate of electoral apathy, with voter turnout lower than 40%. The result was overwhelmingly in favor of the proposals, which were both approved by margins of over 80%; convening a new National Constituent Assembly was approved by 92% of voters, while the bases proposed by Chávez and revised by the CNE were also approved with 87% in favour.

=== Question I ===
"Do you convene a National Constituent Assembly with the purpose of transforming the State and creating a new legal system that allows the functioning of a Social and Participatory Democracy?"

Choice	Votes	%
For	3,630,666	92.36
Against	300,233	7.64
Total	3,930,899	100.00
Valid votes	3,930,899	95.19
Invalid/blank votes	198,648	4.81
Total votes	4,129,547	100.00
Registered voters/turnout	11,022,031	37.47
Source: CNE

=== Question II ===
"Do you agree with the bases proposed by the National Executive for the convocation of the National Constituent Assembly, examined and modified by the National Electoral Council in session dated March 24, 1999 and published in its full text, in the Official Gazette of the Republic of Venezuela No. 36.669 dated March, 25 of 1999?"

Choice	Votes	%
For	3,382,075	86.50
Against	527,632	13.50
Total	3,909,707	100.00
Valid votes	3,909,707	94.91
Invalid/blank votes	209,689	5.09
Total votes	4,119,396	100.00
Registered voters/turnout	11,022,031	37.37
Source: CNE

== See also ==
- 1999 Venezuelan Constituent Assembly election
- 1999 Constituent National Assembly of Venezuela
- December 1999 Venezuelan constitutional referendum
