= Julio Castillo (politician) =

Venezuelan politician (born 1951)

Mayor of Naguanagua Municipality
- In office 2000–2008
- Preceded by: Julio Fuenmayor
- Succeeded by: Alejandro Feo La Cruz

Deputy to the Congress of the Republic
- In office 1994–1999
- Constituency: District 4 (Naguanagua and San Diego)

Personal details
- Born: Julio Rafael Castillo Sagarzazu; February 19, 1951 (age 75) Valencia, Venezuela
- Party: Voluntad Popular (2015–present)
- Other political affiliations: Proyecto Venezuela (1998–2015) MAS (until 1998)
- Education: University of Carabobo
- Occupation: Politician, Professor
- Profession: Lawyer, University professor

Julio Rafael Castillo Sagarzazu (Valencia, Venezuela, February 19, 1951) is a Venezuelan politician and professor, who served as mayor of the Naguanagua Municipality (2000–2008) and as a deputy to the Congress of the Republic.

He is currently a member of Voluntad Popular; however, he was a leader of Proyecto Venezuela until 2015 and a member of the Movimiento al Socialismo (MAS) until 1998.

== Biography ==
Castillo began his political career in the 1970s as a member of the Revolutionary Left Movement (MIR) alongside Alberto Franceschi, both acting as key representatives of MIR in Valencia. During the same decade, while studying at the Faculty of Law, he was elected president of the FCU with MIR’s support. He later became a member of the university's governing body. In the late 1970s, Alberto Franceschi expelled him from the MIR. He was elected Councilman of Valencia Municipality in 1989 for MAS, where he also served as municipal solicitor (syndic) of the Mayor's Office.

In the 1993 parliamentary elections, he was elected as deputy to the National Congress for District 4 (Naguanagua and San Diego) with the support of his party, MAS, and Rafael Caldera’s party, Convergencia. He took office on January 23, 1994, during the IX Legislature.

In 1995, he ran for mayor of Valencia, supported by MAS and COPEI (which nominated then-mayor Argenis Ecarri for Governor of Carabobo), but was defeated by Francisco "Paco" Cabrera. In 1998, parliamentary elections were held again, and Castillo participated as a member of Proyecto Venezuela, being elected but not completing his term due to dissolution of Congress.

In 2000, he was elected mayor of Naguanagua with 33.35% of the vote, supported only by Proyecto Venezuela. In the 2004 regional and municipal elections, Castillo was reelected with 43.23% for the 2004–2008 term. In 2008, he did not seek reelection and supported the candidacy of Alejandro Feo La Cruz. In the 2010 parliamentary elections, he ran as a candidate for Proyecto Venezuela but lost, obtaining 141,624 votes (15.95%).
