= Venezuelan referendum =

Venezuelan referendum may refer to:

- 1957 Venezuelan referendum
- April 1999 Venezuelan constitutional referendum
- December 1999 Venezuelan constitutional referendum
- 2000 Venezuelan trade union leadership referendum
- 2004 Venezuelan recall referendum
- 2007 Venezuelan constitutional referendum
  - 2007 Venezuelan referendum protests
- 2009 Venezuelan constitutional referendum
- 2016 Venezuelan recall referendum project
- 2017 Venezuelan referendum
- 2023 Venezuelan referendum
