= Henrique Salas Feo =

American and Venezuelan politician (born 1960)

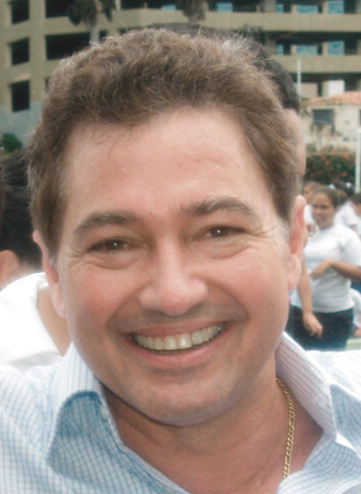
- Salas Feo in 2009

57th and 59th Governor of Carabobo
- In office 4 December 2008 – 28 December 2012
- Preceded by: Luis Felipe Acosta Carlez
- Succeeded by: Francisco Ameliach
- In office 1996–2004
- Preceded by: Henrique Salas Römer
- Succeeded by: Luis Felipe Acosta Carlez

Member of the Chamber of Deputies for Carabobo State
- In office 1994–1995

Personal details
- Born: Henrique Fernando Salas-Römer; 14 December 1960 (age 65) New Haven, Connecticut, U.S.
- Citizenship: United States; Venezuela
- Party: Project Venezuela
- Other political affiliations: Copei (before 1998)
- Spouse(s): María Sigala (m. 1998) Carolina Anka (m. 2011)
- Parent(s): Henrique Salas Romer; Raiza Feo La Cruz
- Profession: Politician; economist
- Nickname: El Pollo

Henrique Fernando Salas-Römer (born 14 December 1960), known professionally as Henrique Salas Feo, is an American-Venezuelan politician, President of the centre-right party Project Venezuela, and the former governor of Carabobo State. He is the son of the former Carabobo Governor and 1998 presidential candidate Henrique Salas Römer. He has run for Governor of Carabobo in five elections (1995–2008), winning four times.

== Early life and education ==
Henrique Fernando Salas Feo was born on December 14, 1960, in New Haven, Connecticut. He is the son of political leader Henrique Salas Römer and Raiza Josefina Feo Lissot. He comes from a family with a long history in public life in Carabobo, both due to his father’s political career and his kinship with the Feo La Cruz family. His maternal grandfather, Salvador Feo La Cruz, served as governor of Carabobo in 1958, appointed by the Governing Junta chaired by Wolfgang Larrazábal.

He attended high school at Liceo Los Arcos in Caracas and also earned his high school diploma at Choate Rosemary Hall in Connecticut. He later pursued higher education at the Metropolitan University of Caracas. Biographical sources primarily identify him as an economist, although an institutional publication from the Metropolitan University lists him as a 1985 graduate with a degree in Business Administration.

== Studies and jobs ==
He holds degrees in economy and industrial relations and post-graduate degrees from the Institute of High Studies of Administration (Venezuela) and the Chase Manhattan Bank. He has worked for IBM International in the section of Market and Sellings Management. In 2005, he participated in the World Fellows program at Yale University.

== Political career ==
In the 1993 Venezuelan parliamentary election he ran successfully for the Venezuelan Congress, becoming deputy for his home state.

In the 1995 Venezuelan regional elections he was elected governor of Carabobo and re-elected in 1998. In the 2000 elections, after the approval of the new Constitution of Venezuela, he won a new term. In the 2004 election he lost his re-election bid to chavista candidate Luis Felipe Acosta Carlez.

In the 2008 election he ran again backed by the National Unity, a broad coalition of opposition parties including Project Venezuela. This time against chavista Mario Silva, a former host of the TV channel Venezolana de Televisión. On November 23 he won the election with 49% of the votes and was sworn on December 4.

Between 2002 and 2004 he was Vice-President of the Union of Latin American Parties (UPLA), a regional division of the International Democratic Union (IDU) that groups conservative political parties from Latin America.

In May 2009 Salas Feo was noted for calling for a "piggy bank" of cash saved up during the oil "bonanza era" to be used to make up shortfalls in block grants to regional governments.

Preceded by Luis Felipe Acosta Carlez	Governor of Carabobo; 2008–2012	Succeeded by Francisco Ameliach
Preceded by Henrique Salas Römer	Governor of Carabobo; 1996–2004	Succeeded by Luis Felipe Acosta Carlez
