= 1999 Venezuelan Constituent Assembly election =

Constituent Assembly elections were held in Venezuela on 25 July 1999, following a referendum in April on convening one.

== Background ==
For the election two large coalitions were created; Patriotic Pole, which consisted of the Fifth Republic Movement, the Movement for Socialism, Fatherland for All, the Communist Party of Venezuela, the People's Electoral Movement and some other minor parties, and Democratic Pole consisting of Democratic Action, Copei, Project Venezuela and Convergencia.

The electoral bases proposed by President Hugo Chávez and revised by the CNE were approved. A proportional representation system to select of the members of the National Constituent Assembly was discarded, and in its place a personalized uninominal direct representation system was established, which divided the country into two great national circuits and one electoral circuit for each state, a system in disuse since the dictatorship of Juan Vicente Gómez.

== Conduct ==
Each voter had 10 votes. Voter turnout was 46.2%.

== Results ==
The result of the election of constituents was the over-representation of Chavismo in the Constituent Assembly and a crushing defeat for the opposition, which had once again gone to the polls divided. With 65% of the votes, pro-Chavez lists held a supermajority in the assembly. The Patriotic Pole won 121 of the 128 seats, whilst an additional three seats were taken by representatives of indigenous communities elected by indigenous associations. Although the great majority of the candidates were civil society members, outside the political parties, the lack of unity atomized their efforts. As such, 33% of the forces that voted for candidates unrelated to the Chavismo only managed to have seven constituents, one of them being Antonia Muñoz, a dissident Chavista who soon rejoined the ruling party.

Party	Votes	%	Seats
Patriotic Pole	29,424,635	65.80	121
Democratic Pole	9,873,223	22.08	4
Other parties	5,423,183	12.13	3
Indigenous representatives			3
Total	44,721,041	100.00	131
Total votes	5,079,445	–	
Registered voters/turnout	10,986,871	46.23	
Source: Nohlen

== Aftermath ==
Political parties and civil associations were marginalized from the constituent process, and the role of opposition then fell on the state institutions, where the Congress and the Supreme Court stand out. After the elections, Democratic Action and Copei experienced internal crises: the former announced new base elections to renew the party, and the directive of the latter resigned immediately.

== See also ==
- April 1999 Venezuelan constitutional referendum
- 1999 Constituent National Assembly of Venezuela
- Members of the 1999 National Constituent Assembly of Venezuela
- December 1999 Venezuelan constitutional referendum
