= December 1999 Venezuelan constitutional referendum =

- 15 December 1999
- Do you endorse the new Constitution drafted by the National Constituent Assembly?

Results
Choice	Votes	%
Yes	3,301,475	71.78%
No	1,298,105	28.22%
Valid votes	4,599,580	95.45%
Invalid or blank votes	219,476	4.55%
Total votes	4,819,056	100.00%
Registered voters/turnout	10,860,799	44.37%
- Results by state

A constitutional referendum was held in Venezuela on 15 December 1999. Voters were asked whether they approved of the new constitution drawn up by the Constitutional Assembly elected earlier in the year. It was approved by 72% of voters, although turnout was only 44%.

== Question ==
The question was:

Do you endorse the new Constitution drafted by the National Constituent Assembly?

== Background ==
After over three months of work, the Constituent presented its draft constitution on 19 November, which was only opposed by four constituents: Claudio Fermín, Alberto Franceschi, Jorge Olavarría and Virgilio Ávila Vivas, who argued that power was being centralized and that a military estate was going to be formed.

== Campaign ==
A referendum was then called for 15 December in order to approve or reject the text. Democratic Action, Copei, Justice First, Project Venezuela and Fedecamaras campaigned against the approval of the Constitution. Although these forces agreed that a new Magna Carta was necessary in general, they were in complete disagreement with the result, where their representation had been symbolic.

Critics believed that the new constitution centralized the national government greatly, granting it too much power while also making too many promises. Henrique Capriles Radonski, then Vice President of the Congress and President of the Chamber of Deputies, stated "This is a centralist, presidentialist constitution with no spread of power to the states and cities ... This is a corrupt constitution that will leave Venezuela backward and poor". Others scoffed at all of the red tape the constitution granted which would scare away foreign investment while also recognizing over-reliance on imported goods.

Weeks before the referendum, tens of thousands protested against the constitutional changes on 24 November 1999, stating that it granted the president, Hugo Chávez, too much power. Chávez responded to his opposition, stating "Those who side with the 'No' vote should get ready because the attack will be merciless ... I will put my boots on and unsheathe my sword".

== Conduct ==
The referendum took place under the same climate of apathy as the one held in April, although the turnout rose to 44%. The increased turnout was attributed to opposition to the new constitution, as the Chavismo suffered marginal losses. Although the state of fragmentation of the partisan opposition, which seemed not to have overcome the 1998 defeat, did not allow them to assume an enthusiastic campaign for the "No", the opposition experienced an increase of 142% with respect to the last referendum. However, the majority of Venezuelans continued to show disinterest in the struggle between pro-government and opposition, even when the constitution was at stake.

== Results ==
Choice	Votes	%
For	3,301,475	71.78
Against	1,298,105	28.22
Total	4,599,580	100.00
Valid votes	4,599,580	95.45
Invalid/blank votes	219,476	4.55
Total votes	4,819,056	100.00
Registered voters/turnout	10,860,799	44.37
Source: CNE

== See also ==
- April 1999 Venezuelan constitutional referendum
- 1999 Venezuelan Constituent Assembly election
- 1999 Constituent National Assembly of Venezuela
