= List of governors of Carabobo =

- State coat of arms

- Flag of the State
- Incumbent; Rafael Lacava
- Style: Governor
- Status: Head of State
- Term length: Four years

This is a list of governors of the Venezuelan Carabobo State:

Until 1989, they were appointed by the president of Venezuela. Starting from that year they are elected in universal, direct and secret elections.

== Elected governors ==
Took office	Left office	Governor	Vote
1989	1992	Henrique Salas Römer, COPEI	47.56
1992	1995	Henrique Salas Römer, COPEI	44.32
1995	1998	Henrique Salas Feo, Proyecto Carabobo	40.64
1998	2000	Henrique Salas Feo, Project Venezuela	49.82
2000	2004	Henrique Salas Feo, Project Venezuela	61.04
2004	2008	Luis Felipe Acosta Carlez, MVR	51.26
2008	2012	Henrique Salas Feo, Project Venezuela	47.50
2012	2016	Francisco Ameliach, PSUV	55.73
2016	2017	Gustavo Pulido Cardier, PSUV	Replacement after Ameliach resigned
2017	2021	Rafael Lacava, PSUV	52.75
2021	2025	Rafael Lacava, PSUV	54.85
2025	2029	Rafael Lacava, PSUV	87.88

== See also ==
- List of Venezuela governors
- Politics of Venezuela
- History of Venezuela
