= José Bernabé Gutiérrez =

Venezuelan politician

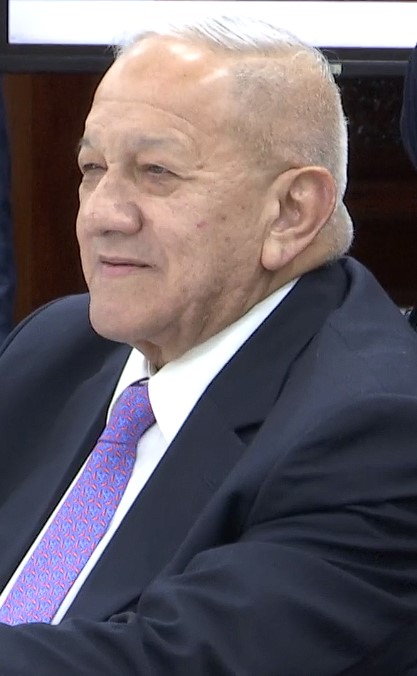
- José Bernabé Gutiérrez in 2022

Member of the National Assembly of Venezuela
- Incumbent
- Assumed office 5 January 2021
- Constituency: National

2nd Governor of Amazonas
- In office 23 January 1996 – 11 February 2001
- Preceded by: Edgar Sayago Murillo
- Succeeded by: Liborio Guarulla

Senator of Venezuela
- In office 23 January 1994 – 23 January 1996

Personal details
- Born: 21 December 1952 (age 73) Caicara del Orinoco, Venezuela
- Party: Democratic Action

José Bernabé Gutiérrez Parra (born December 21, 1952) is a Venezuelan politician who served as Governor of Amazonas from 1996 to 2001, and Senator representing Amazonas from 1994 and 1996. He was a notable leader of Democratic Action (AD) in the last years of Venezuela's bipartisan democracy. In 2020 he was appointed by the Supreme Tribunal of Justice (TSJ) as chair of AD and currently leads the pro-government version of the party.

== Career ==
In 1994 he was elected Senator of the now extinct Congress of Venezuela representing Amazonas. He left his seat in the Senate when he became governor of Amazonas in the 1995 election. He was re-elected in 1998. He was declared winner of the 2000 elections against leftist Liborio Guarulla by a small margin, but later the Supreme Tribunal of Justice (TSJ) ordered to repeat the election in polling places where some irregularities were found. Gutiérrez lost to Guarrulla and left the governorship.

On June 15, 2020, the Supreme Tribunal of Justice illegally suspended the party's national committee to appoint an ad hoc board of directors chaired by Gutiérrez, days after his brother José Luis Gutiérrez was appointed by the TSJ as rector of the National Electoral Council. Bernabé was expelled from AD the next day. Gutiérrez-led AD controls the presence of the party in the ballot, a pro-government party to gain voters from other opposition parties.
