= Julio León Heredia =

Venezuelan politician and Governor of Yaracuy

Governor of Yaracuy
- In office 2008–2025
- Preceded by: Álex Sánchez (interim, after Carlos E. Giménez was impeached)
- Succeeded by: Juan Torrealba

Personal details
- Born: 23 October 1966 (age 59)
- Party: PSUV

Julio León Heredia (born 23 October 1966) is a Venezuelan politician who served as the governor of Yaracuy from 2008 to 2025. He was the PSUV candidate for the 2008 Venezuelan regional elections, and won comfortably. He succeeded Álex Sánchez, an interim governor appointed after Carlos E. Giménez was impeached in June 2008 by the Supreme Tribunal of Justice.

León's career in the Venezuelan air force was cut short when León participated in the November 1992 coup attempt against Carlos Andrés Pérez.
