= Everybody Wins =

Everybody Wins may refer to:

- Everybody Wins (1930 film), a French film directed by René Pujol and Hans Steinhoff
- Everybody Wins (1990 film), an American film directed by Karel Reisz starting Debra Winger and Nick Nolte
- "Say My Name" (Breaking Bad), a television episode originally entitled "Everybody Wins"
- Everybody Wins Independent Movement (Spanish: Movimiento Independiente Ganamos Todos), a former political party in Venezuela
