= Alfredo Peña =

Venezuelan politician and journalist (1944–2016)

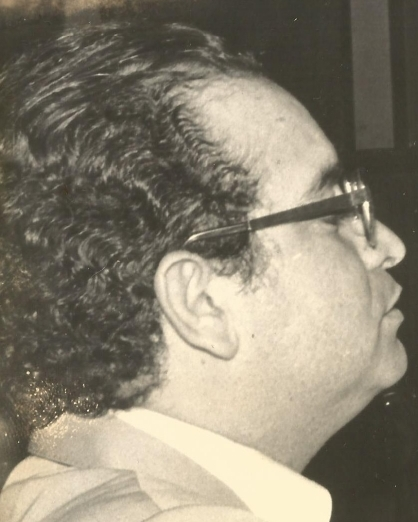

1st Metropolitan Mayor of Caracas
- In office 30 July 2000 – 31 October 2004
- Succeeded by: Juan Barreto

Personal details
- Born: 13 April 1944 Barquisimeto, Venezuela
- Died: 6 September 2016 (aged 72) Miami, Florida, U.S.
- Party: Fifth Republic Movement (MVR)

Alfredo Antonio Peña (13 April 1944 – 6 September 2016) was a Venezuelan journalist and politician.

== Journalism career ==
He studied journalism at the Central University of Venezuela and became well known after he was hired as the director of the newspaper El Nacional. He also hosted his own interview program on the television channel Venevisión, in which he severely criticized the two dominant parties of the second half of the twentieth century in Venezuela, AD and COPEI. His late-night TV program faced harsh criticism over its main theme and it changed names from "Conversaciones con Alfredo Peña" to a more aggressive "Los Peñonazos de Peña". During this time he suffered several attempts on his life, one of them occurring in his apartment, presumably not only to kill him but to destroy his computer and archives. In 1998 he supported the candidacy of Hugo Chávez for the Presidency of Venezuela, and invited Chávez to his program in several occasions.

== Political career ==
In 1999, Peña quit his television program and became one of the prominent members of the Fifth Republic Movement. President Chávez named him Minister of the Secretary of the Presidency. Peña was later elected to the finance committee of the 1999 Constituent Assembly, becoming its chairman. The Assembly wrote the 1999 Constitution of Venezuela.

In July 2000, following the 2000 Venezuelan regional elections, he became the first Mayor of Caracas (Alcaldía Mayor de Caracas, a position that replaced the Venezuelan Federal District) for the Fifth Republic Movement after winning the elections by a landslide. His nomination for Mayor by the Fifth Republic Movement created division within the party, as Aristóbulo Istúriz, chair of the party Patria Para Todos, also wanted the position. Patria Para Todos then abandoned the coalition with the Fifth Republic Movement, only to join it again 18 months later.

In 2001 Peña instituted the Bratton Plan (by William Bratton) to modernize the Metropolitan Police.

In October 2004, shortly before the new mayoral elections, Peña withdrew from the race, alleging national government fraud.

In 2005 Peña was thought to be in Miami, with the Venezuelan government asking for extradition for alleged irregularities relating to the Bratton contract. In 2007 a Venezuelan court ordered his arrest, and in 2009 Venezuela applied to Interpol for assistance in bringing Peña before the court. In 2005 he was also accused by a Venezuelan court of responsibility for some of the deaths during the 2002 Venezuelan coup d'état attempt, some of which Metropolitan Police, under Peña's supervision, were held responsible for.

He died on 6 September 2016 in Miami.
