= List of governors of Monagas =

Governor of Monagas
- State coat of arms

- Flag of the State
- Incumbent; Ernesto Luna
- Style: Governor
- Status: Head of State
- Term length: Four years

This is a list of governors of the Venezuelan state of Monagas.

Until 1989, they were appointed by the president of Venezuela. Starting from that year they are elected in universal, direct and secret elections. In some years the head of Monagas state was known as president or civil and military chief, in others governor. Monagas was created in its present form in 1909. It existed previously as the Province of Maturín (Maturín being its capital) from 1856, becoming the State of Maturín in 1864, before being merged with another state in 1879.

== Monagas State precursors ==
Governors of the Province of Maturín/State of Maturín (1856–64)

- Valentín Machado
- Pedro Sifontes
- Jesús María Vallenilla
- José Antonio López P.
- Zabulón Valverde
- Joaquín Núñez
- Francisco J. Gordon
- José R. Rodríguez Guerra
- Luis Mijares Zerpa
- Manuel B. Fonseca (1863, Provisional President)(1863–64)
- José Manuel García
- José Félix Lares
- Félix Salazar

Governors of Nueva Andalucía State, which Maturín belonged to (1865–68)

- José E, Acosta. (1865, Constitutional President)
- Antonio Russián. (1866–68, First Appointed)
- José S. González. (September 1868, Constitutional President)
- Manuel López Alcalá. (1868)

Governors of Maturín

- José Ramón Ramírez. (1865–68)

Provisional Government: (1868)

- José A. López
- José María Núñez
- Mateo Sosa

Civil and Military Chiefs

- Ángel Romero. (1869)
- Manuel Guzmán Álvarez. (1870)
- Rómulo Camino. (1872, Provisional President)
- Manuel Guzmán Álvarez. (1873, Constitucional President)
- Rómulo Camino. (1874, First Appointed)
- Diego B. Ferrer. (1875, First Appointed)
- Antonio Valverde. (1876, Second Appointed)
- Manuel Guzmán Álvarez. (1877, Constitucional President)
- Emilio Himiob. (1877, First Appointed)
- José Antonio Vázquez. (1878, Second Appointed)
- Jesús M. Vallenilla. (1878, President)
- Santos Carrera. (1879, Vicepresident)
- Venancio Simosa. (1880, Provisional President)
- Santos Carrera. (January to May 1881, Constitutional President)
- Fermín Carrera. (1881, Governor)
- Joaquín Díaz. (1881, Governor)
- Carrera. (1882, Governor)

== Monagas State ==
Presidents of Monagas State (20th century)

- J. V. Guevara. (1901)
- Pablo Giuseppi Monagas. (1910, Provisional President)
- Emilio Fernández (1911–13)
- José J. Aróstegui. (1914, Counsellor in charge of the Presidency)
- Manuel Ángeles. (1916)
- Emilio Pérez Hernández. (1918)
- Pedro Ducharme. (1922–24)
- Manuel Ledesma. (1925–28)
- Juan Pablo López Centeno. (1936–37)
- Andrés Rolando M. (1937)
- Alejandro Rascaniere. (1938–39)
- José María Isava Núñez. (1939–42)
- Francisco Conde García. (1942–45)
- Pablo II. Higuera. (1945)
- Rafael Rodríguez Méndez. (1946–48)
- Pablo Higuera. (1948)
- Ramón Rojas Guardia. (1949)
- Alirio Ugarte Pelayo. (1949–51)
- Horacio Guerrero Gori. (1952)
- Giliberti Gómez. (1953)
- Federico Scholoeter. (1953)
- Domingo Colmenares Vivas. (1954–57)

Governors of Monagas State since 1958

- Temístocles Núñez R. (1958–59)
- Jorge Yibirín Marún (1959–60)
- Luis Piñerúa Ordaz. (1960–61)
- Armando Sánchez Bueno. (1961–62)
- Darío Rodríguez Méndez. (1963–64)
- Noel Grisanti Luciani. (1964–65)
- Luis Alfaro Ucero. (1966–68)
- José Tomás Milano Parma. (1968–69)
- Humberto Anderson. (1969)
- Rafael Solórzano Bruce. (1969–73)
- Pedro Cardier Gago. (1973–74)
- Martín Márquez Añez. (1974–78)
- Manuel García B. (1978–79)
- Pablo Morillo Robles. (1979–83)
- Luis Guevara Manosalva. (1983–84)
- Pedro Cabello Poleo. (1984–86)
- Guillermo Call. (1986–87)
- Pedro Augusto Beauperthuy. (1987–89)

Governors chosen by direct election

Took office	Left office	Governor	Vote
1989	1992	Guillermo Call, Democratic Action	58.05
1992	1995	Guillermo Call, Democratic Action	52.45
1995	1998	Luis Eduardo Martínez, Democratic Action	48.34
1998	2000	Luis Eduardo Martínez, Democratic Action	51.74
2000	2000	Miguel Gómez, MVR	Replacement after Martínez resigned office for health issues.
2000	2004	Guillermo Call, Democratic Action	41.25
2004	2008	José Gregorio Briceño, MIGATO	58.29
2008	2012	José Gregorio Briceño, PSUV	64.86
2012	2017	Yelitza Santaella, PSUV	55.11
2017	2021	Yelitza Santaella, PSUV	54.07
2021	2025	Cosme Arzolay, PSUV	Replacement after Santaella became Minister of Education.
2021	2025	Ernesto Luna, GPPSB	46.22
2025	2029	Ernesto Luna, GPPSB	94.95
