= List of governors of Amazonas (Venezuelan state) =

- State coat of arms

- Flag of the State
- Incumbent; Miguel Rodríguez
- Style: Governor
- Status: Head of State
- Term length: Four years

This is a list of governors of the Venezuelan Amazonas State:

Until 1989, they were appointed by the president of Venezuela. Starting from that year they are elected in universal, direct and secret elections.

== Elected governors ==
Amazonas' bid for statehood was approved in 1992.

| Took office | Left office | Governor | Vote |
|---|---|---|---|
| 1992 | 1995 | Edgar Sayago Murillo, MAS | 39.08 |
| 1995 | 1998 | José Bernabé Gutiérrez, Acción Democrática | 48.57 |
| 1998 | 2000 | José Bernabé Gutiérrez, Acción Democrática | 55.17 |
| 2000 | 2001 | José Bernabé Gutiérrez, Acción Democrática | 43.68 |
| 2001 | 2005 | Liborio Guarulla, PPT | 40.47 |
| 2005 | 2010 | Liborio Guarulla, PPT | 40.00 |
| 2010 | 2012 | Liborio Guarulla, PPT | 31.36 |
| 2012 | 2017 | Liborio Guarulla, MPV | 55.59 |
| 2017 | 2025 | Miguel Rodríguez, PSUV | 60,09 |
| 2025 | 2029 | Miguel Rodríguez, PSUV | 76.03 |

== See also ==
- List of Venezuela governors
- Politics of Venezuela
- History of Venezuela
