= List of governors of Yaracuy =

- State coat of arms

- Flag of the State
- Incumbent; Leonardo Intoci
- Style: Governor
- Status: Head of State
- Term length: Four years

This is a list of governors of the Venezuelan Yaracuy State:

Until 1989, they were appointed by the president of Venezuela. Starting from that year they are elected in universal, direct and secret elections.

== Elected governors ==
Took office	Left office	Governor	Vote
1989	1992	Nelsón Suárez Montiel, COPEI	42.83
1992	1995	Nelsón Suárez Montiel, COPEI	66.43
1995	1998	Eduardo Lapi, National Convergence	45.77
1998	2000	Eduardo Lapi, National Convergence	55.93
2000	2004	Eduardo Lapi, National Convergence	51.32
2004	June 2008	Carlos Eduardo Gimenez Colmenares, For Social Democracy	50.73
June 2008	2008	Álex Sánchez, PSUV	N/A (replacement after Gimenez impeached)
2008	2012	Julio León Heredia, PSUV	57.46
2012	2017	Julio León Heredia, PSUV	61.48
2017	2025	Julio León Heredia, PSUV	62,13
2025	2025	Juan Torrealba, PSUV	
2025	2029	Leonardo Intoci, GPPSB	89,83

== See also ==
- List of Venezuela governors
- Politics of Venezuela
- History of Venezuela
