= Julio Castillo =

Julio Castillo may refer to:

- Julio Castillo (politician) (born 1951), Venezuelan politician
- Julio Alberto Castillo Rodríguez (born 1976), Mexican suspected drug lord
- Julio Castillo (boxer) (born 1988), Ecuadorian boxer
- Julio Castillo Narváez (died 2011), Peruvian producer and radio host
