= Eduardo Lapi =

Venezuelan politician

Eduardo Lapi García

Governor of Yaracuy
- In office 1995–2004
- Preceded by: Nelsón Suárez Montiel
- Succeeded by: Carlos Eduardo Gimenez Colmenares

Personal details
- Born: May 17, 1963 (age 62) Yaritagua, Venezuela
- Party: National Convergence

Eduardo Lapi (born May 17, 1963) is a Venezuelan politician.

== Career ==
He was governor of Yaracuy for the National Convergence from 1995 to 2004. He lost to Carlos Eduardo Gimenez Colmenares (For Social Democracy) in the 2004 Venezuelan regional elections.

In 2008 Lapi was granted asylum in Peru, after escaping prison in Venezuela. He had been charged with corruption, and said that he feared he would not receive a fair trial. Lapi's attempt to run again for Governor of Yaracuy in the 2008 Venezuelan regional elections was aborted by a Supreme Court declaration that he needed to be resident in the country to do so.
