= Fearless People's Alliance =

Political party in Venezuela

Fearless People's Alliance Alianza Bravo Pueblo
- Leader: Antonio Ledezma
- Founded: 2000
- Split from: Democratic Action
- Headquarters: Caracas
- Ideology: Social democracy
- Political position: Centre-left
- National affiliation: I am Venezuela
- Seats in the Latin American Parliament: 0 / 12
- Seats in the National Assembly: 0 / 277
- Governors of States of Venezuela: 0 / 23
- Mayors: 1 / 337

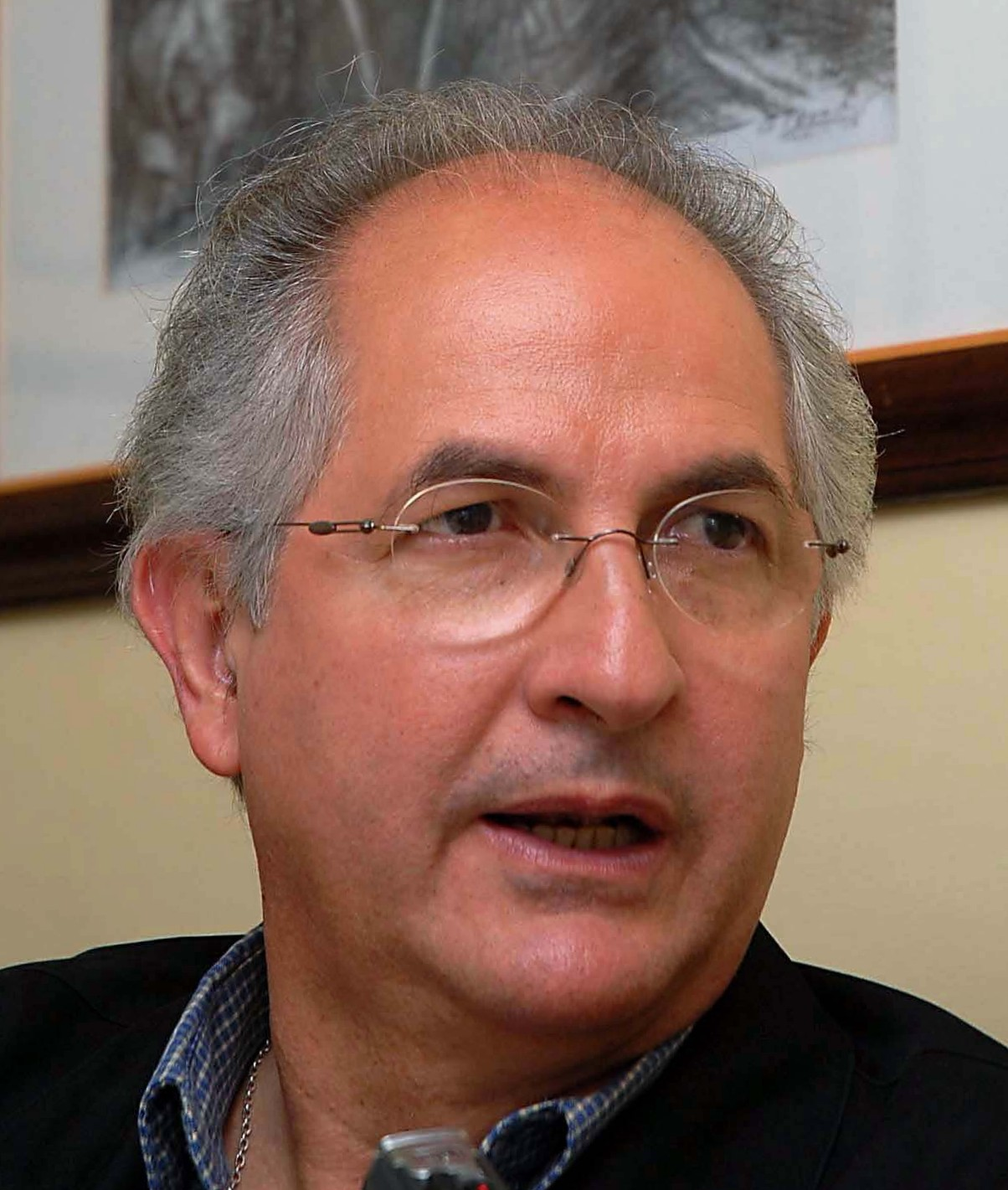
Antonio Ledezma, the leader of the Fearless People's Alliance

The Fearless People's Alliance (Alianza Bravo Pueblo) is a political party in Venezuela. At the 2000 Venezuelan parliamentary election the party won one out of 165 seats in the National Assembly of Venezuela.

== History ==
The party's president Antonio Ledezma was an opponent and outspoken critic of the late former President Hugo Chávez. While his electoral support is not significant, his flamboyant approach has enabled him to maintain a high profile. Ledezma is the former Governor of the Federal District covering Caracas and a former member of Democratic Action, a large social democratic party opposed to Chávez and his successor Maduro.

He made allegations of embezzlement against the Chávez administration and has also alleged that the government is engaging in forced indoctrination of children.

In 2004, he claimed he had been detained in Tazón, near Caracas by military police in what his supporters described as an effort by the Chavez forces to intimidate him from political activity in the Fearless People's Alliance.

The party's name is a reference to Venezuela's national anthem, Gloria al Bravo Pueblo ("Glory to the Brave/Fearless People").
