= Alirio Ugarte Pelayo =

Venezuelan politician

President of the Chamber of Deputies of the Congress of Venezuela
- In office 1965–1966
- Preceded by: Héctor Santaella
- Succeeded by: Dionisio López Orihuela

Governor of Monagas
- In office 1 October 1949 – 1951

Ambassador to Mexico
- In office 1959–1962

Personal details
- Born: 21 January 1923
- Died: 19 May 1966 (aged 43)
- Profession: politician, diplomat, lawyer, journalist

Alirio Ugarte Pelayo (Parroquia Anzoátegui, 21 January 1923 – 19 May 1966), was a Venezuelan politician, journalist, diplomat and lawyer.

== Early life and education ==
He gained a doctorate in political science from the Central University of Venezuela in 1946.

== Career ==
He was appointed Governor of Monagas state (1949–1951) under the military junta set up after the 1948 Venezuelan coup d'état. After the restoration of democracy in 1958, he joined the Democratic Republican Union (URD). He was Ambassador to Mexico (1959–1962), and was elected to the Venezuelan Chamber of Deputies in the 1963 elections, becoming President of the Chamber. He was a member of the Supreme Electoral Council from 1959 to 1964.

Ugarte Pelayo became Secretary General of the URD in 1965, and appeared likely to gain the URD presidential nomination for the 1968 election. In response URD leader Jóvito Villalba, who wanted to be re-nominated, had Ugarte Pelayo suspended from the URD in April 1966. The vote of the URD National Directorate fell 16 to 12, and "it soon became evident that if Ugarte left the party over his suspension, he would take with him the twelve members of the National Directorate who had backed him against Villalba, eight congressmen, and at least ten state organizations." Ugarte Pelayo announced the creation of a new party, Movimiento Demócrata Independiente, and was found dead in his home on 19 May by reporters he had invited for a press conference, an apparent suicide.

A street in Maturín, Avenida Alirio Ugarte Pelayo, is named for him.

== Books ==
- Destino democrático de Venezuela (1960), Editorial América Nueva.

== See also ==
- List of Venezuelans
