= Liborio Guarulla =

Venezuelan politician

Liborio Guarulla Garrido

18th Governor of Amazonas
- In office 2001–2017
- Preceded by: José Bernabé Gutiérrez
- Succeeded by: Miguel Rodríguez

Personal details
- Born: 23 July 1954 (age 71) La Isleta, Venezuela
- Party: Progresist Movement of Venezuela
- Profession: Politician

Liborio Guarulla Garrido is an indigenous Venezuelan politician. He is of Baniwa ethnicity. He served as governor of Amazonas state from 2001 to 2017.

== Early life ==
Guarulla was born on July 23, 1954, in the Amazonas town of La Isleta, in the Maroa Municipality. He studied at the Universidad Central de Venezuela in Caracas, graduating with a degree in Visual Arts.

== Career ==
He joined several political parties: MAS, La Causa Radical, and Patria Para Todos; with the latter, he won the governorship of his state. A challenge was mounted before the Supreme Court in the 2000 election in which José Bernabé Gutiérrez of the Acción Democrática party was initially declared the winner. After an alleged fraud was demonstrated, the areas in question re-voted, and Guarulla won for the 2001–2005 period. He was re-elected in 2005 and 2010. Guarulla worked with other opposition leaders to form a unity candidate to challenge Hugo Chávez for the presidency. He separated from the party Patria para todos and formed the progressivist party MPV. In the election, Chavez beat opposition candidate Henrique Capriles. In the same year, Guarulla was again re-elected in Amazonas.

In 2014, Guarulla and another opposition-aligned governor Henri Falcón participated in the dialogue with the government amid the protests.

In 2019, Guarulla joined A New Era party.

=== Dabucuri-Curse ===
In the context of the 2017 Venezuelan protests, which started when the Supreme Tribunal of Justice closed the parliament, Guarulla was barred from office for 15 years. In consequence of that decision, Guarulla cursed those responsible.

«I will invoke the power of my ancestors and my shamans so that the curse of the Dabukuri falls upon those who have tried to do us evil, I assure you that you won’t die without torment. I assure you that before you die you will begin to suffer and that your soul will wander through the darkest and most pestilent places before you can, somehow, close your eyes».

The curse was executed on May 17, 2017, at the end of the March Of The Shamans in Puerto Ayacucho, the capital of Amazonas.

== Personal life ==
Guarulla is married to Judith Campos and has two children, Pumeyawa Guarulla and Liborio Guarulla Umawaly.

His sister, Nirma Guarulla, is also a politician. She headed the Legislative council of Amazonas and represented the state in the National Assembly.

Liborio's nephew, Eric Guarulla Payua, was the head of the General Archive of Amazonas Governor’s Office. In 2017, he was murdered while in office.
