= Óscar Celli Gerbasi =

Venezuelan politician

Governor of Carabobo
- In office 1985–1988
- Preceded by: José Ignacio Acevedo
- Succeeded by: José Luque

Personal details
- Born: Oscar Raúl Celli Gerbasi; January 16, 1946 Valencia, Carabobo, Venezuela
- Died: August 1, 2016 (aged 70) Valencia, Carabobo, Venezuela
- Party: Democratic Action

Óscar Raúl Celli Gerbasi (January 16, 1946 – August 1, 2016) was a Venezuelan politician and member of the Democratic Action (AD). Celli, who had previously served in the former Legislative Assembly of Carabobo, was appointed Governor of the Venezuelan state of Carabobo from 1985 until 1988 by President Jaime Lusinchi. He later became a deputy in the National Assembly.

Celli was an important member of Venezuelan National Congress with more than 30 years of service. His role in this legislative body as founder President of the Environmental Commission of Venezuela was vital to promote a framework of laws to protect the environment.

Óscar Celli was also President of Environmental Commission at Parlamento Latinoamericano and Caribe, General Secretary of AD in Carabobo State, General Secretary of International Socialist for Latin America and the Caribbean, President of The Legislative Congress of Carabobo State among many other political positions.

During his administration as governor many projects came to reality as Arturo Michelena International Airport, High performance road system Los Colorados, Paseo Cabriales Avenue, Carabobo State Justice Palace, CICPC general Headquarters, Cardiologist Unit Carabobo Central Hospital, bleachers Jose B. Perez Stadium, Highway Variante Valencia-San Diego, Rómulo Betancourt Park, The Braulio Salazar Museum, main section Ateneo de Valencia, Andres Eloy Blanco avenue, Lisandro Alvarado avenue, Santa Ines community, Gymnastic Arena Naguanagua, Highway Yagua in Guacara County, Gonzalo Barrios Park, Francisco Figueredo avenue, Andres Eloy Blanco avenue, Aranzazu avenue, Elevado La Quizanda, The Arts Centre of Carabobo State, Museum of Ciudad Alianza, Feo La Cruz Library, Ruiz Pineda Sports Complex, Simon Bolivar school, Colomine school, Cirilo Alberto school, Hipolito Cisneros school, The Dentistry Faculty of Universidad de Carabobo, water supply for all sections of Carabobo State.

Celli was born in the city of Valencia, Carabobo, on January 16, 1946. He died in Valencia on August 1, 2016, at the age of 70.
