= Carlos E. Giménez =

Venezuelan politician

Carlos Giménez

Governor of Yaracuy
- In office 2004 – June 2008
- Preceded by: Eduardo Lapi
- Succeeded by: Álex Sánchez

Personal details
- Party: For Social Democracy

Carlos Eduardo Giménez Colmenares is a Venezuelan politician and was the governor of Yaracuy from 2004 to 2008. He was impeached in June 2008 by the Supreme Tribunal of Justice, and replaced by Álex Sánchez.

== Biography ==
Carlos Eduardo Giménez Colmenares was born in the Independencia Municipality, located in the Yaracuy State on April 9, 1959. He would go on to study law at the Universidad Fermin Toro in Barquisimeto in the Lara State. He was elected to the Yaracuy Legislative Assembly in 1993 where he would serve until 1996, when he was elected mayor of Independencia Municipality. In 1998, he became vice-president of the Bolivarian National Association of Mayors of Venezuela (Asociacion Nacional Bolivariana de Alcaldes de Venezuela). That same year, he supported the candidacy of Hugo Chávez. In the October 2004 regional elections, Gimenez was elected governor of Yaracuy, beating the incumbent anti-Chavez governor, Eduardo Lapi.

Yaracuy State Governor Election, 2004 Results
Source: CNE data

Candidates	Votes	%
Carlos Gimenez	101481	51%
Eduardo Lapi	94835	47%
