= Antonio Ledezma =

Venezuelan politician

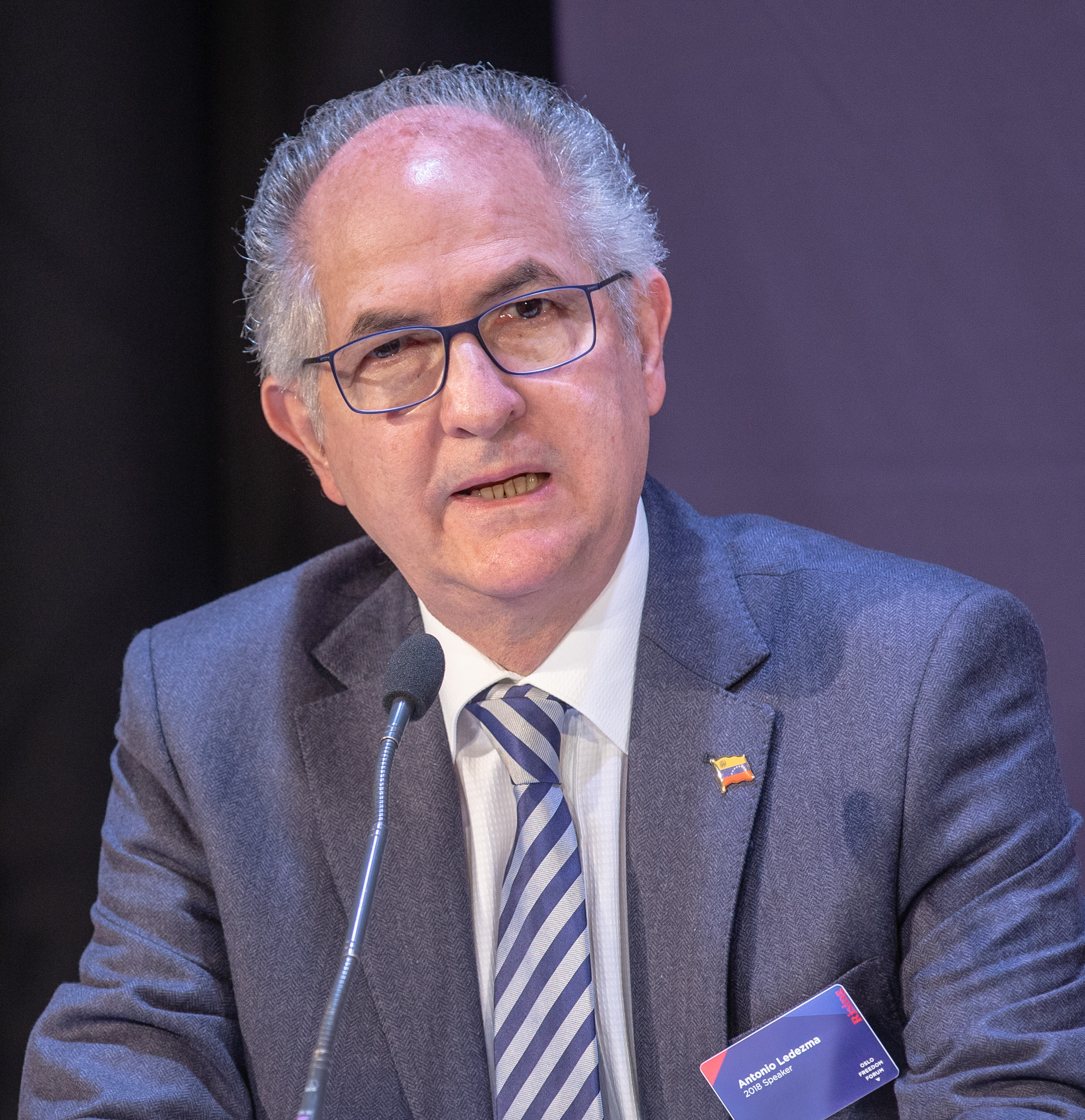
- Ledezma in 2018

3rd Metropolitan Mayor of Caracas
- In office 1 December 2008 – 19 February 2015
- Preceded by: Juan Barreto
- Succeeded by: Helen Fernández

4th Mayor of Libertador Municipality
- In office 23 January 1996 – 30 July 2000
- Preceded by: Aristóbulo Istúriz
- Succeeded by: Freddy Bernal

Member of the Senate of Venezuela for Guárico State
- In office 23 January 1994 – 23 January 1995

Governor of the Federal District
- In office 13 January 1992 – 24 May 1993
- President: Carlos Andrés Pérez
- Preceded by: Virgilio Ávila Vivas
- Succeeded by: César Rodríguez Berrizbeitía

Member of the Chamber of Deputies for Guárico State
- In office 23 January 1984 – 13 January 1992

Personal details
- Born: Antonio José Ledezma Díaz; 1 May 1955 (age 71) San Juan de los Morros, Guárico, Venezuela
- Party: Democratic Action (1973-2000); Fearless People's Alliance (2000–present)
- Spouse: Mitzy Capriles
- Children: 4
- Education: Universidad Santa María; Universidad Metropolitana
- Awards: Sakharov Prize (2017)
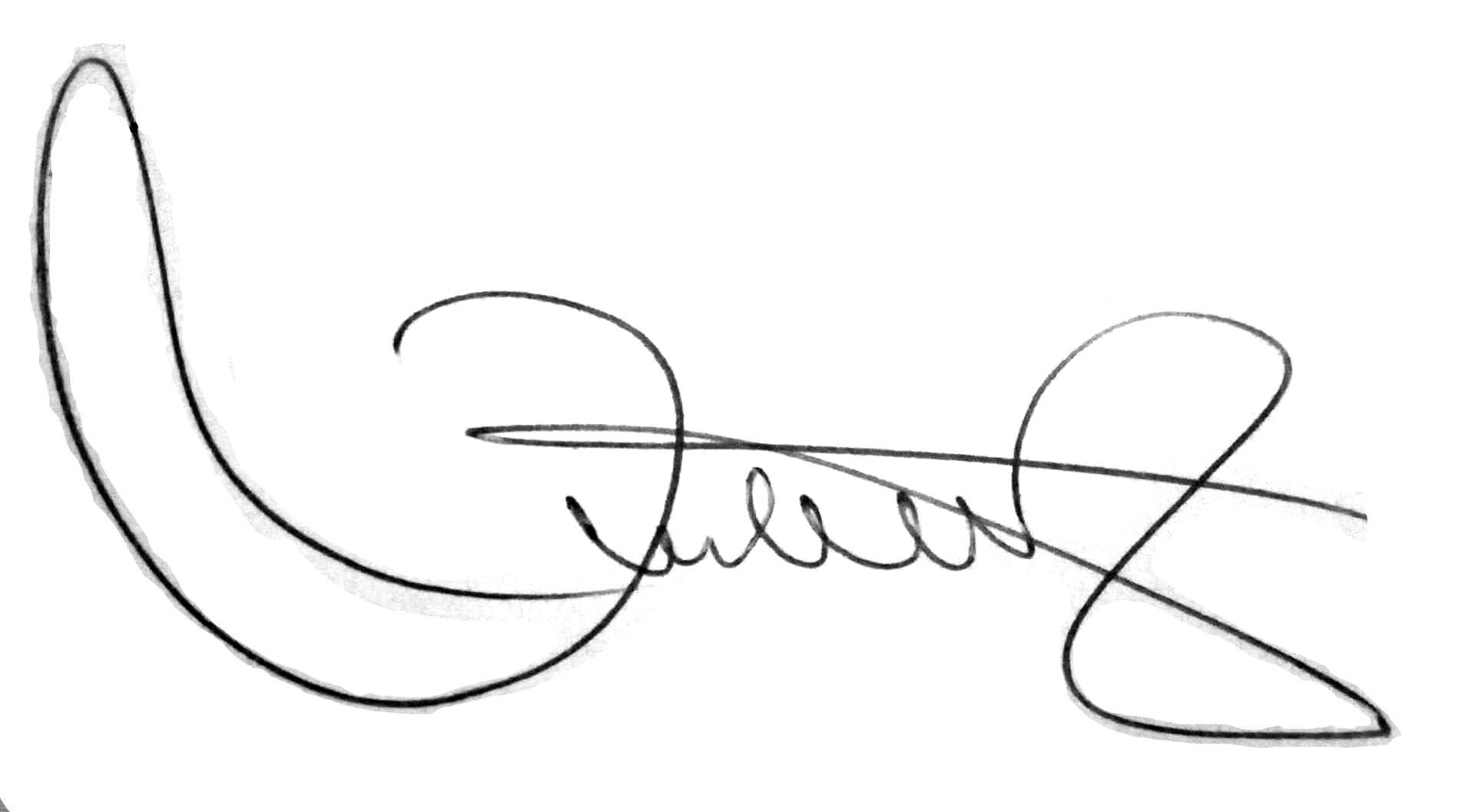
- Signature

Antonio José Ledezma Díaz (born 1 May 1955) is a Venezuelan lawyer, opposition politician and former political prisoner. After unsuccessfully challenging for the leadership of Democratic Action in 1999, he founded a new party, the Fearless People's Alliance.

== Political career ==
After involvement in politics in his home state of Guárico in the 1970s for Democratic Action, he served two terms in the Venezuelan Chamber of Deputies (from 1984), and was elected to the Venezuelan Senate in 1994. He then served as mayor of the Libertador Municipality (1996–2000) of the Venezuelan Capital District, having been appointed governor of the now-defunct Federal District (1992–1993) by Carlos Andrés Pérez.

He also served as the head of Coordinadora Democrática opposition coalition. In 2003, he presented the list of signature collection centers to the National Electoral Council in preparation for the 2004 recall referendum against the Chávez's presidency. Ledezma left Coordinadora Democrática in September 2004, saying that he did not agree to participate in the upcoming regional elections and that the government would commit fraud. In 2014, Ledezma was one of the main leaders of La Salida protest movement.

=== Federal District governorship ===
In January 1992, he was appointed by President Carlos Andrés Pérez as Governor of the former Federal District (which included the current Capital District and Vargas State), replacing Virgilio Ávila Vivas. In November 1992, the Caracas police killed over 100 prisoners in the Catia prison. According to Ledezma: "What happened in the Catia prison is linked to the coup insurrection, because there is no doubt that what was intended was to create chaos in Caracas and that more than 3,000 inmates took to the streets, and this had to be controlled at the cost of many lives". He held this position until 21 May 1993, when President Pérez was dismissed by the Supreme Court of Justice, being replaced by César Rodríguez, also from Democratic Action.

=== Libertador Municipality mayorship ===
He ran for mayor of the Libertador Municipality of Caracas in the 1995 regional elections and won, an office that he held between 1996 and 2000. From the beginning, he promoted a policy to reduce the number of street vendors and informal traders, demolished the popular market of La Hoyada, built the new public transportation terminal of La Bandera, took charge of the procedures for the repatriation of a large number of undocumented immigrants residing in Caracas, and campaigned for the construction of line 4 of the Caracas Metro. Regarding his relations with the national executive, in a sort of capital cohabitation, he maintained good relations with President Rafael Caldera. However, he kept distance with the Hugo Chávez government.

In 1998, according to the law, the term of all mayors was due to expire, but due to the large number of elections to be held that year (presidential, regional and parliamentary elections), the municipal elections were postponed. At the beginning of 2000, he announced his intention to run for the presidency, which was to be held that year due to the approval a year before of the new Constitution which stipulated new general elections. However, he decided to abandon the idea due to the launching of the candidacy of Chávez's former partner, Francisco Arias Cárdenas, indicating that he would not be a divisive element in the opposition. He then sought reelection as mayor, but was defeated by the ruling party candidate and member of the Fifth Republic Movement, Freddy Bernal. Ledezma did not recognize the results and considered them fraudulent.

During this period he also presided over the Metropolitan Council of Government (1997-1998), was appointed Vice President of the Union of Capital Cities of Iberoamerica in 1998, and between 1999 and 2000 he presided over the National Association of Mayors of Venezuela. In 1999, he aspired to the General Secretariat of Democratic Action, but declined shortly thereafter because he disagreed with the manner of election of the authorities of the party. For said reason, he resigned from that political organization in 2000 and founded, along with some dissidents, in that year, the Fearless People's Alliance party, an organization that he still presides.

=== Caracas Metropolitan mayorship ===
In 2008, Ledezma ran as candidate for Caracas Metropolitan mayor, supported by different opposition parties and challenging pro-government PSUV and Fatherland for All candidate Aristóbulo Istúriz. In August the registration period for candidates to participate in the regional elections closed, and after Lepoldo López was unable to register, A New Era registered William Ojeda as its option for the mayoralty. In September Ojeda withdrew his candidacy and supported Ledezma, becoming the candidate of the unity. In October, days prior to the electoral event, some opinion polls showed a supposed technical tie between the pro-government candidate, Aristóbulo Istúriz and Ledezma, while others gave him a short advantage.

On 23 November 2008, the regional elections were held and Ledezma won with 52.42% of the votes, with the support of his party and 21 other opposition parties. In his speech accepting the results, he promised to make Caracas "a city for life" and dedicated his victory to the poorest. He included Carlos Melo, Leopoldo López and Yon Goicoechea in his cabinet. He was re-elected in 2013 for the Democratic Unity Roundtable coalition against his opponent Ernesto Villegas.

==== Hunger strike ====
After his election, the National Assembly passed a Capital District Law on 30 April 2009, that transferred most functions, funding, and personnel of the Metropolitan Mayor of Caracas to a new Venezuelan Capital District (headed by Jacqueline Faría, an official directly appointed by Hugo Chávez) covering in particular the political center of Caracas and the municipality of Libertador. A legal challenge was filed and a request was filed with the National Electoral Council to hold a referendum, but this did not stop the transfer. The opposition described the move as a deliberate negation of the popular vote, while Chávez supporters described the political and budgetary reorganization as an "act of justice" for Libertador, the largest and poorest of the five municipalities making up Caracas. Following the removal of such power, Ledezma began a hunger strike that drew international attention.

On July 3, 2009, Mayor Ledezma went to the Organization of American States (OAS) offices in Caracas to declare the hunger strike in rejection of the national government's attitude of not recognizing the mayor of the Metropolitan District. According to the mayor, the strike was a success for the mayor since the government and the OAS gave in to his demands. Pro-government media, such as the Agencia Bolivariana de Noticias, were quick to qualify this strike as a "simple show", since according to the government, the mayor already had the funds to pay the employees of his mayor's office, one of the points for which he went on hunger strike. However, the day before in the evening hours, the Sole Authority of the Capital District, an instance recently created by decree of the government of President Hugo Chávez, which assumed competencies that were taken away from Ledezma in the framework of a legal reform, announced the transfer to the mayor's office of a "financial aid" of 52. 52,000 bolivars (about 24,186 dollars) so that the Metropolitan Mayor's Office, whose headquarters in Caracas also passed from Ledezma's hands to the government of the Capital District, "proceeds to cancel, strictly" the payrolls of June and July, according to a statement. The Secretary General of the OAS, José Miguel Insulza, promised to receive a commission of governors and parliamentarians in Washington.

== Arrest ==
On February 19, 2015, he was detained by the Bolivarian Intelligence Service at his office in the EXA Tower in Caracas. In the operation, the security forces made warning shots to the air to disperse a crowd that was forming. He was then transported to SEBIN's headquarters in Plaza Venezuela. His lawyer declared that the charges for his detention were unknown. Ledezma was arrested by the Venezuelan Government after accusations made by President Nicolás Maduro about an "American plot to overthrow the government" that he presented a week before Ledezma's arrest. Ledezma mocked the accusations stating that the Venezuelan government was destabilizing itself through corruption. The United States rejected the accusations by President Maduro and stated that "Venezuela’s problems cannot be solved by criminalizing dissent". He was imprisoned in Ramo Verde military jail. Two months later, he was sent back home for health reasons, where he had been placed under house arrest and unable to express himself publicly.

=== Response to arrest ===
==== Demonstrations ====
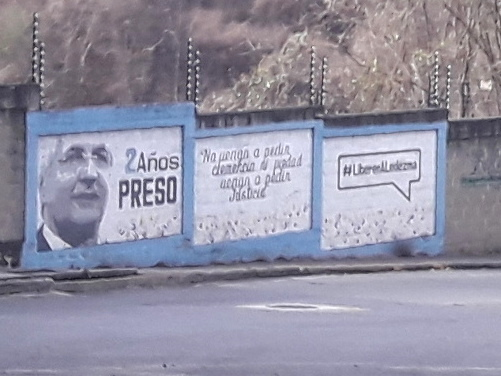
Wall painting in Caracas demanding Ledezma's release.

Following the news of the arrest of Ledezma, his supporters quickly created protests and called the arrest a "kidnapping" and that the coup conspiracy was created for political purposes. Hours after the news broke, hundreds of Ledezma supporters gathered in a Caracas plaza to denounce his arrest. Protesters also gathered outside of the SEBIN headquarters.

==== Human rights groups ====
Amnesty International condemned Ledezma's arrest calling it politically motivated, noting the similar cases of arrests made by the Venezuelan Government in what Amnesty International described as "silencing dissenting voices". Human Rights Watch demanded his release with Human Rights Watch's Americas division director, Jose Miguel Vivanco, stating that without evidence, Ledezma "faces another case of arbitrary detention of opponents in a country where there is no judicial independence".

=== Trial ===
In March 2015, former socialist Prime Minister of Spain, Felipe González, agreed to take over the defense of Ledezma in his trial after Ledezma's family requested his assistance.

=== Escape from house arrest ===
On November 17, 2017, Ledezma slipped past guards and fled to Colombia. He departed the same day from El Dorado International Airport to Adolfo Suárez Madrid–Barajas Airport in Madrid, Spain. Upon landing he declared he would continue his fight of opposition to the Venezuelan government and was reunited with his family.

== Exile ==
Ledezma signed the Madrid Charter.

In October 2023, the Venezuelan government called for the extradition of Ledezma; a 2017 request was denied by Spanish courts and condemned by Amnesty International.

== Awards and recognition ==
- 2010 – Finalist for the 2010 World Mayor prize.
- 2015 – National Endowment for Democracy awarded Ledezma its Democracy Award in May 2015.
- 2015 – Cádiz Cortes Ibero-American Freedom Prize was awarded "given the unblemished defense of freedom in your community and minimum requirements of the realization of human rights in the same, which has led them to be subject to public rebuke of their government, including the flagrant situation of imprisonment or the cutting of your minimal civil rights".
- 2016 Courage Award, Geneva Summit for Human Rights and Democracy, shared with Leopoldo Lopez, "for inspiring the world with their extraordinary courage in the defense of liberty and universal human rights."

== See also ==
- Political prisoners in Venezuela

| Preceded by Juan Barreto | Metropolitan Mayor of Caracas; 2008–2015 | Succeeded by Helen Fernández |
| Preceded by Aristóbulo Istúriz | Mayor of Libertador Municipality; 1995–2000 | Succeeded by Freddy Bernal |
| Preceded by Virgilio Ávila Vivas | Governor of Federal District of Venezuela; 1992–1993 | Succeeded by César Rodríguez |
