= 2004 Venezuelan regional elections =

- 31 October 2004
- Turnout: 45.7%
Alliance	Chavismo	Opposition
Popular vote	3,761,129	2,536,560
Percentage	58.31%	39.32%
- Red denotes states won by the Chavismo. Blue denotes those won by the Opposition.

Regional elections were held in Venezuela on 31 October 2004 to elect 22 governors and 2 metropolitan mayors for a four-year term beginning in 2004 and ending in 2008, when the next regional elections were held. The elections were originally scheduled for 26 September 2004, but faced technical issues and an application for annulment requested by the opposition, and were held under high political pressure after the events of the recall referendum of August 2004. The ongoing political crisis in the country and the proximity of the two electoral processes marked the environment of the elections, which were won by the candidates supported by the president, Hugo Chavez.

A total 1,577 political organizations participated in the elections; however, abstention levels reached 52%. As a result, the opposition held two of the 22 governments but lost the Caracas and capital district mayorships. Henrique Salas Feo, son of Henrique Salas-Römer who ran as a presidential candidate in 1998, lost the government of Carabobo to Luis Acosta Carlez. Claudio Fermin, who run for precedency in the elections of 2000, had no success at the metropolitan mayorship of Caracas, losing to Juan Barreto. Opposition candidate and incumbent governor Enrique Mendoza, who was considered as a possible future presidential candidate, lost the elections of the Miranda state to Diosdado Cabello. Manuel Rosales, who would later run for presidency in the elections of 2006, became the governor of the Zulia state.

== Candidates ==
Following, the list of three main candidates according to their political affiliation (government, opposition and dissident or independent) ordered by number of votes attained. The political affiliation is determined by the political parties supporting each candidate. For the 2004 elections, government candidates were supported by the Fifth Republic Movement (MVR) party; opposition candidates were supported by either Democratic Action (AD), Justice First Movement (PJ), A New Era (UNT), or the Political Electoral Independent Organization Committee (COPEI) party; and independent candidates were mostly supported by regional parties.

=== Metropolitan mayors ===
†	Indicates the winning candidate

Metropolitan Area	Affiliation	Candidate	%	Votes
Caracas	Government	Juan Barreto ‡	60.33	388,356
Caracas	Opposition (politics)	Claudio Fermin	39.28	252,881
Caracas	Independent	Reina Sequera	0.22	1,419
Capital District	Government	Freddy Bernal ‡	73.89	284,085
Capital District	Opposition (politics)	Carlos Melo	19.05	73,265
Capital District	Opposition (politics)	Jesus Suarez	5.79	22,269

=== Governors ===
†	Indicates the winning candidate

State	Affiliation	Candidate	%	Votes
Anzoátegui	Government	Tarek William Saab ‡	57.38	187,209
Anzoátegui	Opposition (politics)	Antonio Barreto Sira	42.33	138,120
Anzoátegui	Independent	Elias Lopez Portillo	0.11	370
Apure	Government	Jesus Aguilarte ‡	66.85	88,587
Apure	Opposition (politics)	Luis Lippa	27.49	36,431
Apure	Independent	Jose Montilla	4.55	6,040
Aragua	Government	Didalco Bolívar ‡	67.69	217,796
Aragua	Opposition (politics)	Margarita Tablante	22.09	71,085
Aragua	Independent	Luiz Augusto Zapata	5.17	16,654
Barinas	Government	Hugo de los R. Chavez ‡	76.26	135,674
Barinas	Opposition (politics)	Andres Eloy Camejo	13.85	24,651
Barinas	Independent	Rafael Rosales Peña	7.82	13,912
Bolívar	Government	Francisco Rangel ‡	58.84	146,329
Bolívar	Opposition (politics)	Antonio Rojas Suarez	37.40	93,012
Bolívar	Opposition (politics)	Jorge Carvajal	2.57	6,413
Carabobo	Government	Luis Acosta Carlez ‡	51.25	311,189
Carabobo	Opposition (politics)	Henrique Salas Römer	48.01	291,519
Carabobo	Independent	Jose Gregorio Ruiz	0.72	4,378
Cojedes	Government	Jhonny Yanez Rangel ‡	56.12	54,142
Cojedes	Opposition (politics)	Alberto Galindez	36.32	35,044
Cojedes	Independent	Jose Felipe Machado	0.16	4,013
Delta Amacuro	Government	Yelitza Santaella ‡	61.30	29,441
Delta Amacuro	Independent	Emeri Mata	37.15	17,843
Delta Amacuro	Opposition (politics)	Victor Cedeño	1.44	695
Falcón	Government	Jesús Montilla ‡	59.47	118,718
Falcón	Opposition (politics)	Luis Stefanelli	36.61	73,100
Falcón	Independent	Yoel Acosta Chirinos	3.46	6,922
Guárico	Government	Eduardo Manuitt ‡	78.45	115,010
Guárico	Opposition (politics)	Jose Malave Risso	18.75	27,495
Guárico	Independent	Alexis Bermudez	1.32	1,942
Lara	Government	Luis Reyes Reyes ‡	73.55	289,945
Lara	Opposition (politics)	Orlando Fernandez	18.70	73,714
Lara	Opposition (politics)	Mariano Navarro	4.39	17,307
Mérida	Government	Florencio Porras ‡	60.74	135,895
Mérida	Opposition (politics)	William Davila	21.66	48,465
Mérida	Opposition (politics)	Carlos Belandria	15.48	34,649
Miranda	Government	Diosdado Cabello ‡	51.87	345,752
Miranda	Opposition (politics)	Enrique Mendoza	48.12	320,731
Monagas	Government	Jose Briceño ‡	58.28	144,326
Monagas	Opposition (politics)	Guillermo Call	41.43	102,599
Monagas	Independent	Romulo Rojas	0.27	678
Nueva Esparta	Opposition (politics)	Morel Rodriguez ‡	51.32	66,432
Nueva Esparta	Government	Alexis Navarro Rojas	43.53	56,350
Nueva Esparta	Independent	Eustacio Aguilera	3.37	4,372
Portuguesa	Government	Antonia Muñoz ‡	59.98	128,370
Portuguesa	Opposition (politics)	Ivan Colmenares	34.67	74,206
Portuguesa	Independent	Angel Graterol	1.74	3,742
Sucre	Government	Ramon Martínez ‡	62.19	140,407
Sucre	Opposition (politics)	Ramiro Gomez	35.69	80,595
Sucre	Independent	Napoleon Barrios	1.50	3,404
Táchira	Government	Ronald Blanco ‡	57.47	169,587
Táchira	Opposition (politics)	Sergio Omar Calderon	39.88	117,682
Táchira	Independent	Jose Luis Rincon	2.29	6,763
Trujillo	Government	Gilmer Viloria ‡	54.30	101,141
Trujillo	Opposition (politics)	Conrado Perez	28.06	52,257
Trujillo	Independent	Oresteres Leal	14.79	27,546
Vargas	Government	Antonio Rodriguez ‡	55.22	38,920
Vargas	Independent	Roberto Smith	19.29	13,598
Vargas	Independent	Gladys Requena	10.21	7,200
Yaracuy	Government	Carlos Gimenez ‡	50.73	101,481
Yaracuy	Independent	Eduardo Lapi	47.40	94,835
Yaracuy	Opposition (politics)	Alfonso Puche	1.75	3,505
Zulia	Opposition (politics)	Manuel Rosales ‡	54.02	483,924
Zulia	Government	Alberto Gutierrez	44.42	397,927
Zulia	Independent	Francisco Arias Cardenas	0.56	5,092
