= United Multi-Ethnic Peoples of Amazonas =

Political party in Venezuela

- Founded: 1997
- Ideology: indigenismo

The United Multi-Ethnic Peoples of Amazonas (Spanish: Pueblos Unidos Multiétnicos del Amazonas, PUAMA) is a political party in Venezuela.

== History ==
The party was created in 1997. On November 8, 1998, PUAMA participated in elections for the first time. He decided to support the candidacy for governor of Nelson Silva, who had the support of Copei, MAS, PPT and the MVR, the candidate comes second and PUAMA adds 1.5% of the votes, in that same election the party obtains a position in the defunct State Legislative Assembly.

For the elections of July 30, 2000, PUAMA managed to consolidate itself in Amazonas, by winning one seat of the three that were disputed in that entity for the National Assembly of Venezuela, which by then was made up of 165 seats, as well as another seat for the new State Legislative Council of Amazonas (CLEA). He also achieved victory in the mayoralties of Atures and Manapiare. A separate case is that of the election for governor of Amazonas that year in which José Bernabé Gutiérrez of AD was the winner against the candidate for governor of the PPT Liborio Guarulla whom PUAMA supported, however, the elections were partially repeated in 2001 by alleged fraud in seven polling stations, giving the victory to Guarulla, with the PUAMA card being the second party to contribute the highest number of votes to the elected governor.

In the next election, on August 14, 2004, he obtained a position as legislator for Daniel Guevara in the CLEA, in addition to two mayoralties, Autana and Manapiare. In the 2005 gubernatorial election, the ruling party's candidate was discussed between Guarulla of the PPT and Edgildo Palau of PUAMA. Without reaching any agreement, the party decided to launch its own candidacy without the support of the rest of the ruling parties, including the MVR, the Victory went to Liborio Guarulla who won 40% of the votes, Bernabé Gutierrez of AD 36% and Palau 20%. That year he also repeated his seat in the National Assembly after the parliamentary elections. In the regional elections held on November 21, 2021, the party won the mayoralty of the Manapiare Municipality. He also won a seat in the State Legislative Council.
