= Francisco Ameliach =

Venezuelan politician (born 1963)

President of Corpozulia
- Incumbent
- Assumed office 12 August 2025
- President: Nicolás Maduro; Delcy Rodríguez (acting)
- Preceded by: Néstor Reverol

Governor of Carabobo
- In office 27 December 2012 – 14 June 2017
- Preceded by: Henrique Salas Feo
- Succeeded by: Gustavo Pulido

Minister for Presidential Affairs
- In office 13 October 2010 – 13 May 2011
- President: Hugo Chávez
- Preceded by: María Godoy Peña
- Succeeded by: Erika Farías

President of the National Assembly of Venezuela
- In office 5 January 2003 – 5 January 2005
- Preceded by: Willian Lara
- Succeeded by: Nicolás Maduro

Personal details
- Born: 14 June 1963 (age 62) Valencia, Carabobo, Venezuela
- Party: United Socialist Party of Venezuela
- Spouse: Elizabeth Rangel de Ameliach
- Profession: Militar and politician
- Website: http://ameliach.psuv.org.ve/

Francisco José Ameliach Orta (born 14 June 1963) is a Venezuelan retired military officer and politician who is vice president of the United Socialist Party of Venezuela (PSUV).

== Political career ==
Born in Valencia, Ameliach was part of the 1992 Venezuelan coup d'état attempts led by Hugo Chávez, later in 1999 he retired from the National Armed Forces in order run as a candidate for the National Constituent Assembly. In 2000 he joined the Fifth Republic Movement and was elected to the National Assembly on 6 January 2000. He was reelected in 2005.

In 2008 Ameliach ran for the candidature for Governor of Carabobo but lost the primary election against Mario Silva. In 2012 he finally won the elections defeating incumbent Governor Henrique Salas Feo.

== Sanctions ==
Ameliach has been sanctioned by several countries.

On 9 August 2017, the United States Department of the Treasury placed sanctions on Ameliach for his position in the Presidential Commission in the 2017 Constituent Assembly of Venezuela.

Months later on 22 September 2017, Canada sanctioned Ameliach due to rupture of Venezuela's constitutional order.

On 29 March 2018, Ameliach was sanctioned by the Panamanian government for his alleged involvement with "money laundering, financing of terrorism and financing the proliferation of weapons of mass destruction".
