= 2000 Venezuelan regional elections =

- 30 July 2000

23 governorships 332 mayors
- Registered: 11,720,660
- Turnout: 56.15% (▲2.71pp)
Alliance	MVR	AD	MAS
Popular vote	1,397,086	678,250	288,940
Percentage	35.74%	17.35%	7.39%
Swing	▲21.48pp	▼10.93pp	▼3.04pp
Governors	12	3	3
Governors +/–	▲11	▼5	▲2
Alliance	Copei	PRVZL	UNT
Popular vote	283,185	225,269	158,443
Percentage	7.24%	5.76%	4.05%
Swing	▼7.83pp	▼0.32pp	New
Governors	1	1	1
Governors +/–	▼3	Steady	New
- Acción Democrática Copei Movimiento al Socialismo Un Nuevo Tiempo Convergencia Proyecto Venezuela Movimiento V República Patria Para Todos

Regional elections were held in Venezuela on 30 July 2000, alongside the 2000 Venezuelan parliamentary election and 2000 Venezuelan presidential election. The regional elections were for Venezuelan state governorships and mayorships. The Fifth Republic Movement (supported by its Patriotic Pole partners) took 14 of the 23 governorships, while COPEI took 2 and joint Democratic Action-COPEI candidates took another 2. The new First Justice won two mayoral races for Chacao and Baruta.

== See also ==
- Constitution of Venezuela
- 1999 Constituent National Assembly of Venezuela
- Politics of Venezuela
