= Juan Barreto =

Venezuelan politician

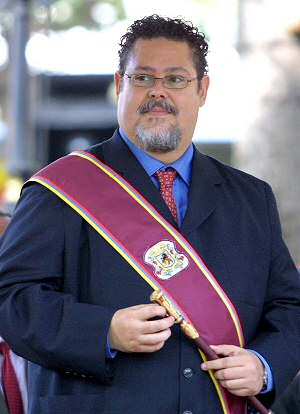
- Barreto in 2005

2nd Metropolitan Mayor of Caracas
- In office 31 October 2004 – 7 December 2008
- Preceded by: Alfredo Peña
- Succeeded by: Antonio Ledezma

Deputy of the National Assembly for the Capital District
- In office 14 August 2000 – 31 October 2004

Personal details
- Born: Juan Alejandro Barreto Cipriani; 7 August 1959 (age 67) Maracay, Aragua, Venezuela
- Party: Fifth Republic Movement (1997-2007); United Socialist Party of Venezuela (2007–2012); REDES (2012-present)
- Education: Central University of Venezuela

Juan Alejandro Barreto Cipriani (born 7 August 1959) is a Venezuelan politician and sociologist who served as mayor of Caracas from 2004 until 2008. Juan Barreto belongs to the REDES party.

== Career ==
=== Congressperson ===
Juan Barreto entered the political scene with his election to the Venezuelan Chamber of Deputies in the November 1998 elections. On July 30, 2000, Barreto was elected to the newly created National Assembly (the legislative body that replaced the Chamber of Deputies), receiving 276,952 votes, or 53.98% of the total votes, and represented the Venezuelan Capital District. He resigned from this position when he was elected mayor of Caracas in October 2004.

=== Mayor of Caracas ===
During his term in office, Barreto's relationships with the other mayors of Caracas were hostile. On August 22, 2006 he denounced fellow mayors Leopoldo López and Henrique Capriles. In response, both announced legal action against him.

=== Other ===
Juan Barreto has received degrees in journalism and social sciences. He was the director of the newspaper "Correo del Presidente", the Oficina Central de Información (OCI, now the Ministry of Communication and Information), and the news agency Venpres (now known as the Agencia Bolivariana de Noticias, or ABN). Barreto is also a professor at the Universidad Central de Venezuela.

He was longlisted for the 2008 World Mayor award.

== See also ==
- Leopoldo López
- Henrique Capriles
