= Alberto Franceschi =

Venezuelan politician and businessman

Alberto Franceschi González (born 20 May 1947) is a Venezuelan politician and businessman. Since December 2013, Franceschi has been living in exile in the United States after the Nicolás Maduro government threatened to arrest him. Initially a communist, he became an opponent of Chavismo and a supporter of right-wing politics.

== Biography ==
He was born in Miranda, Carabobo state on 20 May 1947, in a family of Corsican origin.

=== Political career ===
He was leader of the Revolutionary Left Movement at the University of Carabobo. Founding member of the Marxist Socialist Workers Party (PST), of which he was secretary general in the 1980s. He accompanied Argentine Nahuel Moreno in the foundation and in the top direction for 8 years of the International Workers League – Fourth International (LIT-CI), which fought intransigently all Stalinist governments around the world, coming to act clandestinely sustained in the countries under communist autocracies after the Iron Curtain and in the USSR itself, until its collapse caused by the democratic political revolutions with which Franceschi actively collaborated in its preparation for 18 years.

When winning the expulsion processes of the communists of power Franceschi finally left his political activity at the end of the 1980s when he abandoned all political activity and his Trotskyist ideology with which he entered into open contradiction, and is dedicated to the private family business in transportation heavy and simultaneously to agriculture and breeding.

In 1996, he temporarily separated from his private activity to return to political activity, but this time under a markedly different ideological sign, rather from the center-right, since he dedicated himself to building the political organization Project Venezuela throughout the country. Two years later in 1998, he was appointed campaign manager of the presidential candidate of the former governor of the Carabobo state, Henrique Salas Römer, belonging to the Project Venezuela party. When Hugo Chávez won the elections, he is elected deputy and head of the parliamentary fraction of Project Venezuela.

=== Exile ===
During the government of Hugo Chávez and his successor Nicolás Maduro, Franceschi was characterized by defending his opposition proposals with greater radicalism to the political line of the so-called "democratic opposition" to which he qualifies as "blandengue" and supporter of cohabitation With the dictatorship. Because of his extreme political positions against the government in office, Franceschi has been required and prosecuted, which led him to exile from December 2013 in the United States.

He is currently a columnist in several digital newspapers and develops a great activity in social networks since his exile in the United States, particularly on Twitter, Facebook, Periscope, radios, Zello and YouTube.

Franceschi has declared himself a supporter of Vox, a Spanish conservative party with which he has maintained contacts with some of its leaders. He also signed the Madrid Charter, drafted by Vox.
