= José Gregorio Briceño =

Venezuelan politician

Governor of Monagas
- In office 2004–2012
- Preceded by: Guillermo Call
- Succeeded by: Yelitza Santaella

Personal details
- Born: December 12, 1965 (age 60) Caicara, Monagas State
- Party: MIGATO (1997–2007, 2012–present)
- Other political affiliations: PSUV (2007–2012)
- Spouse: Madeleine de Briceño
- Profession: Politician

José Gregorio Briceño Torrealba (born July 25, 1965) is a Venezuelan politician.

== Life ==
Briceño began his political life in 1979 as a member of Acción Democrática (AD). After being expelled from AD in 1991 Briceño founded a political party called Movimiento Independiente Cedeño (MIC). He became mayor of Cedeño Municipality in the regional elections of 1992 and was re-elected in 1995. In 1997 he founded a new political party named MIGATO. This became part of PSUV in 2007.

Briceño ran unsuccessfully for the governor of Monagas' office in 1998; however he won a seat in the Venezuelan Chamber of Deputies as Deputy. In 1999 Briceño was a member of the Constituent Assembly. In 2000 Briceño lost the competition for the governor's office again, although he was elected deputy of the National Assembly of Venezuela.

José Gregorio Briceño became governor of Monagas in 2004 and was re-elected in the elections of 2008.

In 2013 he sought asylum in Costa Rica.

== Sources ==
- Official Biography

Preceded by Guillermo Call	Governor of Monagas; 2004–2012	Succeeded by Yelitza Santaella
Preceded by Olga de Morales	Mayor of Cedeño Municipality; 1993–1999	Succeeded by Domingo Pedemonte
