= 2000 Venezuelan trade union leadership referendum =

- 3 December 2000
- Do you agree that the trade union leadership must be renewed in the next 180 days, following an Electoral Statute to be approved by the Electoral Power, and according to the principles of alternation and universal, direct and secret elections as ordained in the Bolivarian Constitution of Venezuela, and that the directive boards of those unions, federations and confederations are suspended from their functions until those elections take place?

Results
Choice	Votes	%
Yes	1,632,750	69.40%
No	719,771	30.60%
Valid votes	2,352,521	89.36%
Invalid or blank votes	280,002	10.64%
Total votes	2,632,523	100.00%
Registered voters/turnout	11,202,214	23.5%

A referendum on trade union leadership was held in Venezuela on 3 December 2000. Voters were asked:

Do you agree that the trade union leadership must be renewed in the next 180 days, following an Electoral Statute to be approved by the Electoral Power, and according to the principles of alternation and universal, direct and secret elections as ordained in the Bolivarian Constitution of Venezuela, and that the directive boards of those unions, federations and confederations are suspended from their functions until those elections take place?

It was approved by 69.4% of voters, with a turnout of just 23.5%.

== Results ==
Choice	Votes	%
For	1,632,750	69.40
Against	719,771	30.60
Total	2,352,521	100.00
Valid votes	2,352,521	89.36
Invalid/blank votes	280,002	10.64
Total votes	2,632,523	100.00
Registered voters/turnout	11,202,214	23.50
Source: CNE
