= MIGATO =

Political party in Venezuela

- Leader: José Gregorio Briceño
- Founded: 1997 (original); 2012 (re-founded)
- Merged into: PSUV, 2007
- Headquarters: Monagas
- Ideology: Localism
- Political position: Centre

MIGATO (abbreviation of Movimiento Independiente Ganamos Todos, lit. 'Everybody Wins Independent Movement') is a political party in Venezuela.

Migato was founded in 1997 by José Gregorio Briceño, the mayor of Cedeño Municipality of Monagas State. "El gato" (the cat) is his nickname and "mi gato" means "my cat". At the 2000 Venezuelan parliamentary election, the party won 1 out of 165 seats in the National Assembly of Venezuela.

Briceño was elected as the governor of Monagas in 2004. The 2005 election gave it 1 National Assembly seat again. Though their influence was significant in Monagas, both victories were mainly due to the alliance with the Fifth Republic Movement, which was the party of the president Hugo Chávez. It merged into PSUV on 2007-10-20.

In March 2012, Briceño re-founded MIGATO when he was suspended by the PSUV over an oil spill in Monagas, which poisoned the water of the Guarapiche River that the PSUV leaders were claiming was safe to drink. Briceño supported the candidacy of Henrique Capriles in the 2012 Venezuelan presidential election.
