= 1998 Venezuelan presidential election =

- 6 December 1998
- Registered: 11,013,020
- Turnout: 63.45% (▲3.29pp)
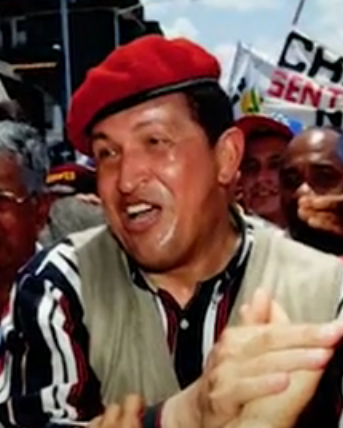

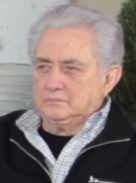
Nominee	Hugo Chávez	Henrique Salas Römer
Party	Fifth Republic	Project Venezuela
Popular vote	3,673,685	2,613,161
Percentage	56.20%	39.97%
- Results by state
President before election
Rafael Caldera
CVGC
Elected President
Hugo Chávez
MVR

Presidential elections were held in Venezuela on 6 December 1998. The main candidates were Hugo Chávez, a career military officer who led a 1992 coup d'état against President Carlos Andrés Pérez; and former Carabobo Governor Henrique Salas Römer. Both candidates represented newly formed parties, a first in a country where the main candidates always represented the parties of the bipartisanship. Chávez represented the Fifth Republic Movement (MVR), while Salas Römer represented Project Venezuela. Initially weak in the polls, Chávez ran on an anti-corruption and anti-poverty platform, condemning the two major parties that had dominated Venezuelan politics since 1958; and he began to gain ground in the polls after the previous front runners faded. Despite the fact that the major parties (Copei and Democratic Action) endorsed Salas Römer, Chávez was elected into his first term as President of Venezuela.

The election resulted in a political realignment which brought about the end of the bipartisanship that had dominated the political atmosphere of the country in the last 40 years, and began the dominance of the MVR party (later merged into the United Socialist Party of Venezuela) under the Bolivarian Revolution system that still holds political power in Venezuela as of August 2026.

== Background ==
In the early 1990s the Venezuelan government's economic strength and political legitimacy was declining, with two coup attempts in 1992 and the impeachment for corruption of President Carlos Andrés Pérez. The result was a turn against the traditional Puntofijo Pact parties (Democratic Action and Copei) in the 1993 elections: Rafael Caldera's victory in 1993 was the first time in Venezuela's democratic history that a president had been elected without the support of either of the two major parties. It was symptomatic that Caldera's election platform included pardoning those who had participated in the coup attempts, and he did so in 1994. Hugo Chávez, imprisoned for his role in the February 1992 coup attempt, was among those released.

By 1998 the economic crisis had grown even worse. Per capita GDP was at the same level as 1963, down a third from its 1978 peak; purchasing power was a third of its 1978 level. In 1995 real wages were below the levels attained in 1950, and between 1995 and 1998 they had declined by four percent per year. The percentage of households below the poverty line had risen from 20% in 1980/81 to 56% in the 1998–2000 period. In 1998 40% of the population under age 17 was suffering from malnutrition, and 76% lived in poverty. According to 1998 CENDA data, 85% of households lived in poverty, including 45% in extreme poverty. For decades protests, shortages, and mismanagement had been occurring more frequently, highlighting the progressive economic deterioration of the country.

=== Chávez's participation ===
After his 1994 release from prison, Chávez maintained a position against participation in elections, believing them a fixed game which merely legitimated the established order. This led to a split with his colleague Francisco Arias Cárdenas, who left the MBR-200. Shortly after his release, Chávez considered another coup attempt, but with the prospects appearing slim, some advisers, notably Luis Miquilena, urged him to reconsider his scepticism of the elections, arguing that Chávez could potentially win so convincingly that the establishment would not be able to deny him victory. To find out whether this was the case, Chávez set up teams of psychologists, sociologists, university professors and students to carry out a survey. With their support, grassroots members of the Bolivarian movement polled tens of thousands of people across the country. The results showed that 70% of respondents supported Chávez running for the presidency – and 57% said they would vote for him.

Support for the electoral route was strengthened when Arias Cárdenas, as a candidate for Radical Cause, won the governorship of Zulia State in the December 1995 regional elections. Despite this, the MBR-200 remained divided over electoral participation and spent a year debating the issue in local, regional and national assemblies. A national congress on 19 April 1997 took from 9 am until 2 am the next day to reach a conclusion, ultimately deciding to launch Chávez' candidacy. Some members of the movement resigned in protest, holding too much at stake. In July 1997 Chávez registered the Fifth Republic Movement with the National Electoral Council (the name had to be changed as Venezuelan law did not permit parties to use Simón Bolívar's name). The international media took little interest, citing opinion polls showing 8% support for Chávez.

== Electoral process ==
The 1998 elections were the first to be carried out with a non-partisan National Electoral Council. Traditionally poll workers had been provided by the parties, but in this election "a lottery was set up to draft 300,000 registered voters as poll workers". The elections also saw "the world's first automated voting system, which featured a single integrated electronic network that was supposed to transmit the results from the polling stations to central headquarters within minutes." Whilst Venezuela had traditionally provided election observers to other Latin American countries, the uncertainty of the new system and the possibility of handover to a non-traditional party raised the stakes in terms of demonstrating that the elections would be fair, and Venezuela invited international election observers for the first time. The Organization of American States, European Union, Carter Center and International Republican Institute all sent delegations.

The automated vote system enabled the Electoral Council to announce the results within 2.5 hours of the polls closing. After corroborating the results with the Carter Center, the losing candidate conceded several hours later.

== Campaign ==
The campaign was dominated by independent candidates, as the electorate completed the turn against the establishment parties begun in 1993. In a December 1997 poll Irene Sáez, a former beauty queen (Miss Universe 1981) and mayor of the Caracas district of Chacao, reached almost 70% as an independent candidate. However, despite spending millions of dollars on publicity, she fell below 15% within six months, as the public became increasingly skeptical of her readiness for the presidency, and as she lost credibility as an anti-establishment candidate after accepting the endorsement of COPEI. The other early leading candidate, the former Democratic Action leader Claudio Fermín, reached 35% in December 1997 but fell to 6% by April 1998.

During 1998, it became increasingly clear that the campaign was a race between Salas Römer and Chávez. Salas Römer, the governor of Carabobo and leader of the Project Venezuela party, appeared a credible candidate as Sáez lost ground and reached 21% in the polls in August 1998. However at the same time, Chávez's campaign gained ground as he established himself with the electorate. From around 5% in September 1997 to over 10% in late February 1998, Chávez registered 30% in polls taken in May 1998; by August he was registering 39%.

The Chávez platform comprised three basic pledges. First to begin his presidency by abolishing Venezuela's old puntofijismo political system of two-party patronage, and opening up political power to independent and third parties. Second, to end corruption. Third, to eradicate poverty in Venezuela. In working to gain the trust of voters, Chávez drafted an agenda that drew heavily on his interpretation of Bolivarianism. Chávez also utilized his charisma and flamboyant public speaking style—noted for its abundance of colloquialisms and ribald manner—on the campaign trail to help win the trust and favor of a primarily poor and working class following. On one occasion, he threatened to "fry" the heads of his opponents.

The two traditional main parties hoped that 8 November parliamentary and regional elections would give them a boost, a month ahead of 8 December presidential elections, but the poll remained a two-person race. At this point polls generally showed Chávez with a 6–12-point lead over Salas Römer's approximately 38% poll numbers, though in some polls he exceeded that margin. Both COPEI and Democratic Action sought to endorse Salas Römer (he was reluctant to accept). COPEI persuaded its candidate (Sáez) to resign, but Democratic Action's candidate, Alfaro Ucero, refused to do so, triggering an electoral crisis as the National Electoral Council had to rule on whether the Democratic Action ballot slot belonged to the party or the candidate. Salas Römer agreed to accept the endorsement of COPEI and Democratic Action regional and local parties, and sought to maintain a distance to the parties' national leadership. In the end it was not enough, and Chávez won a substantial majority, with 17 of 23 states.

== Results ==
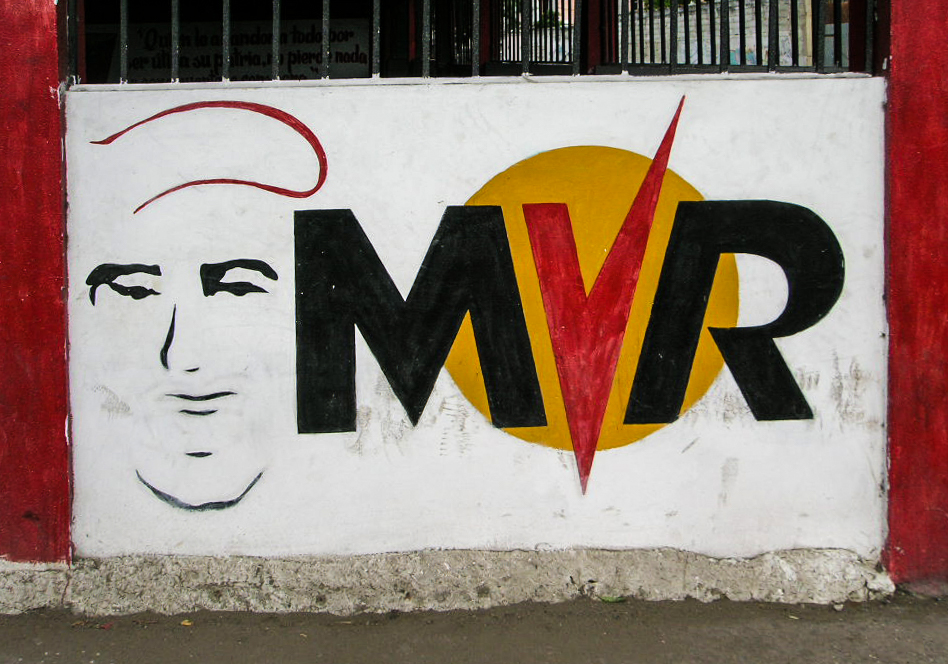
Mural of Fifth Republic Movement (MVR) logo

Candidate	Party	Votes	%
Hugo Chávez	Fifth Republic Movement	3,673,685	56.20
Henrique Salas Römer	Project Venezuela	2,613,161	39.97
Irene Sáez	Integration, Representation and New Hope	184,568	2.82
Luis Alfaro Ucero	Authentic Renewal Organization	27,586	0.42
Miguel Rodríguez Fandeo	Opening for National Participation	19,629	0.30
Alfredo Ramos	Radical Cause	7,275	0.11
Radamés Muñoz León	New Way	2,919	0.04
Oswaldo Sujú Raffo	Sovereign Front	2,901	0.04
Alejandro Peña Esclusa	Venezuelan Labour Party	2,424	0.04
Domenico Tanzi	Complementary Participation	1,900	0.03
Ignacio Quintana	National Opinion	1,256	0.02
Total		6,537,304	100.00
Valid votes		6,537,304	93.55
Invalid/blank votes		450,987	6.45
Total votes		6,988,291	100.00
Registered voters/turnout		11,013,020	63.45
Source: CNE

== Reactions ==
=== Domestic ===
Following his victory, Chávez promised that he would not devalue the bolivar and that currency controls would not be created. Salas Römer reacted to the results stating "I not only accept the victory of my adversary but wish him luck, lots of luck, because his luck will be that of Venezuela". Some Chávez supporters reacted to his election by saying that they would accept an authoritarian government under Chávez if he decided to utilize such form of government.

=== International ===
The United States reacted cautiously, with American Ambassador John Maisto stating "With respect to what we know about Mr. Chavez's platform, we will have to see what his policies are, in fact, and see whom he will appoint to key positions".
