= Claudio Fermín =

Venezuelan politician

Claudio Fermin
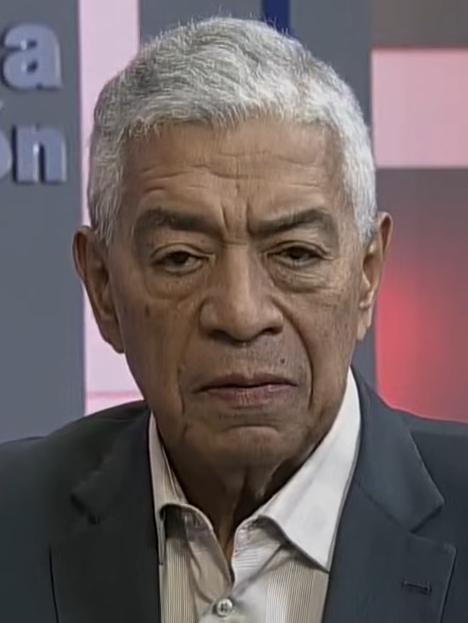
- Fermín in 2026

1st Mayor of Libertador Municipality
- In office 2 January 1990 – 6 January 1993
- Preceded by: Position established
- Succeeded by: Aristóbulo Istúriz

Personal details
- Born: Claudio Eloy Fermín Maldonado; 25 March 1950 (age 76) Barinas, Barinas, Barinas State, Venezuela
- Education: Andrés Bello Catholic University

Claudio Eloy Fermín Maldonado (born in Barinas, Barinas, March 25, 1950) is a Venezuelan politician and sociologist.

== Career ==
He was deputy minister of youth under Jaime Lusinchi, and subsequently Mayor of Libertador municipality, Caracas (1989–1993) for Acción Democrática, narrowly missing out on re-election to La Causa Radical's Aristóbulo Istúriz. He was the AD candidate in the 1993 presidential election, coming second with 24% of the vote.

He ran as an independent in the 1998 presidential election, but withdrew before election day. In 1999 he was elected to the Constituent Assembly which drafted the new Constitution of Venezuela. He ran in the 2000 presidential election under the banner of Encuentro Nacional, a party he founded, gaining less than 3% of the vote. He participated in the 2004 and 2008 regional elections, running for Mayor of Libertador Municipality.

Fermín founded Soluciones para Venezuela Party, which participated in 2020 Venezuelan parliamentary election in alliance with the Networks Party.

He ran again in the 2024 presidential election.

Political offices
Preceded by Juan Alberto Santos	Mayor of Libertador Municipality; 1989–1993	Succeeded by Aristóbulo Istúriz
