= Henrique Salas Römer =

Venezuelan politician (born 1936)

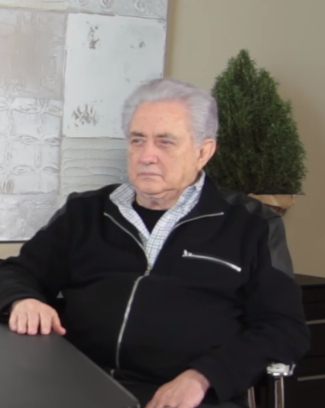
- Salas in 2018

56th Governor of Carabobo
- In office 23 January 1990 – 23 January 1996
- Preceded by: Pablo González
- Succeeded by: Henrique Salas Feo

Member of the Chamber of Deputies for Carabobo State
- In office 23 January 1984 – 23 January 1990

Personal details
- Born: 17 April 1936 (age 90) Puerto Cabello
- Party: Proyecto Venezuela
- Other political affiliations: Copei (1989–1998)
- Spouse: Raiza Salas Römer
- Education: Yale University
- Profession: Politician, Economist

Henrique Salas Römer (born 17 April 1936) is a Venezuelan economist, politically active in Venezuela since 1983.

In 1989, he was elected governor of his home state Carabobo and re-elected in 1992. In 1998, he ran for the presidency of Venezuela as the candidate of Project Venezuela, a national party developing out of Römer's regional Project Carabobo party. Four days before the election, the two main political parties in Venezuela at the time, COPEI and Democratic Action, switched their support to him. In the election, he was runner-up to Hugo Chávez, garnering 40% of the vote in a six-man race. As an outcome of his presidential campaign, he founded a new political organization, Proyecto Venezuela.

== Biography ==
He was born on 17 April 1936. as the eldest son of Jacob Salas Salas (1907–1987), a native of Puerto Cabello. He completed his early studies at Unidad Educativa San José "La Salle". After finishing primary school, he was sent to the United States where he graduated from high school with honors and entered Yale University in 1955. In 1957, he returned to the country for two years to work alongside his father, and during that period, with the overthrow of General Marcos Pérez Jiménez, he actively participated in the process that culminated with the election of Rómulo Betancourt as president of Venezuela. In 1959, he returned to his alma mater and at the end of that year married Raiza Josefina Feo Lissot (1942), daughter of Salvador Feo La Cruz (the first Governor of Carabobo State at the start of the democratic era) and aunt of Alejandro Feo La Cruz. They had three children, Henrique Fernando, who was born shortly before graduating as an economist in 1961, Raiza Gabriela, and Juan Miguel. For several years he held positions in the private sector while teaching Monetary Theory and Financial Institutions at the University of Carabobo. He later moved to Caracas, and in the early 1980s he founded a Center for Strategic Analysis. Three years later, he was invited to present, on behalf of the independent world, the candidacy of former president Rafael Caldera, who was seeking to return to power. This marked the beginning of his political career.

== Political career ==
=== Member of Congress ===
In the 1983 elections, Henrique Salas Römer entered public life when he was elected as an independent to the Congress of the Republic, a position to which he was re-elected five years later. His tenure was noted for defending citizen spaces and promoting decentralization. In early 1988, he was elected President of the Permanent Commission on Neighborhood Affairs, created that year by unanimous political agreement, in recognition of his work defending an impoverished middle class affected by irregularities in the massive construction of housing.

=== Governor of Carabobo ===
In 1989, the first regional elections were held, and Salas Römer, with the support of the COPEI and MAS parties, defeated former governor Oscar Celli Gerbasi of Democratic Action, winning 46%. Three years later, he was re-elected, this time winning nearly three-quarters of the votes, and a few months later, during the judicial process that led to the removal of President Carlos Andrés Pérez, he and his colleagues founded the Association of Governors of Venezuela, with him becoming its first President. His tenure as governor, and his leadership in decentralization, positioned him as a potential presidential candidate in the 1998 election. In the 1995 regional elections, he supported Congressman Henrique Salas Feo, his son, who was elected governor of Carabobo. This was the first time anywhere in the world that the son of a governor immediately succeeded his father through popular vote.

=== Presidential candidacy ===
Henrique Salas Römer spent the next two years touring the country, and at the end of 1997 announced his independent candidacy for the Presidency of the Republic. At the time of the announcement, neither he nor Hugo Chávez were considered likely winners. However, the traditional parties had lost popular support, and these two candidates ended up obtaining 97% of the vote. During his political career, Salas Römer had to create two parties since it was a legal requirement to register a candidacy. In 1995, he founded Proyecto Carabobo, which, three months later and following his son's victory, became the first regional party. In 1998, he decided to create Proyecto Venezuela in order to register his presidential candidacy, and the new party obtained significant representation in the National Congress.

Throughout 1998, it became increasingly clear that the race was between Henrique Salas Römer and Hugo Chávez. Salas Römer emerged as a credible candidate after Chacao mayor Irene Sáez lost ground, reaching 21% in the polls in August 1998. Meanwhile, support for Chávez grew from 5% in September 1997 to over 10% by the end of February 1998. By May, he had surpassed 30%, and by August, polls placed him in the lead for the first time, with 39% against Salas Römer's 38%, within the margin of error. A few weeks before the election, the traditional parties Acción Democrática (AD) and COPEI endorsed Salas Römer, who accepted their support while seeking to maintain some distance from their national leadership. Salas Römer met with Marcos Pérez Jiménez during the campaign to seek his support, but did not obtain it. In the elections, Salas Römer received 2,613,161 votes (almost 40%), against the winner Hugo Chávez, who obtained 56%.
