= National Convergence =

Venezuelan Christian democratic party

National Convergence Convergencia Nacional
- Leader: Juan José Caldera
- Founder: Rafael Caldera
- Founded: 1993; 33 years ago
- Split from: Copei
- Headquarters: San Felipe, Yaracuy
- Ideology: Christian democracy Christian humanism
- Political position: Centre-right
- National affiliation: Unitary Platform
- International affiliation: Christian Democrat Organization of America (observer)
- Colours: Green; Red; Yellow
- Slogan: "A commitment to solidarity!"
- Seats in the Latin American Parliament: 0 / 12
- Seats in the National Assembly: 0 / 277
- Governors: 0 / 23
- Mayors: 0 / 337

The National Convergence (Spanish: Convergencia Nacional) is a Christian democratic political party in Venezuela.

Placed on the centre-right of the political spectrum, the party was founded in 1993 by former President of Venezuela Rafael Caldera, who left Copei and won a second term in the 1993 elections.

From 1995 to 2004 Eduardo Lapi held the Governorship of Yaracuy for the party. The party boycotted the 2005 elections.

== List of presidents ==
- Rafael Caldera (1994–1999) – Direct elections – Lawyer
