= Project Venezuela =

Political party in Venezuela

Proyecto Venezuela Project Venezuela
- Leader: Henrique Salas Römer
- Founded: 1995
- Headquarters: Valencia, Carabobo
- Ideology: Liberal conservatism Christian democracy
- Political position: Centre-right
- National affiliation: Democratic Unity Roundtable
- Regional affiliation: Union of Latin American Parties
- International affiliation: International Democracy Union
- Seats in the National Assembly: 2 / 277

Project Venezuela (Spanish: Proyecto Venezuela) is a center-right political party in Venezuela.

At the legislative elections, 30 July 2000, the party won seven out of 165 seats in the National Assembly of Venezuela. The legislative elections of 2006 were boycotted by the party. The leader is Henrique Salas Römer who was a Presidential Candidate in the 1998 elections.

Its current president is Salas Römer's son, Henrique Salas Feo, former governor of Carabobo. It is a full member of the International Democracy Union (IDU).

For the 2017 and 2018 elections, the party withdrew from participating, saying that the CNE's process was too demanding.
