= 2017 Democratic Unity Roundtable state primaries =

On the occasion of the regional elections convened in Venezuela in October 2017, which completed the previous term of Governors, the Bureau of Democratic Unity had proposed the holding of primary elections to choose the unitary candidates to represent them and obtain the victory in each state and circuit.

State	Candidate	Party
Amazonas	Liborio Guarulla	Movimiento Progresista de Venezuela
Amazonas	José Bernabé Gutiérrez	Acción Democrática
Anzoátegui	Antonio Barreto Sira	Acción Democrática
Anzoátegui	Gustavo Marcano	Primero Justicia
Apure	Luis Lippa	Fuerza Ciudadana
Apure	José Gregorio Montilla	Acción Democrática
Apure	Lumay Barreto	Voluntad Popular
Aragua	Richard Mardo	Primero Justicia
Aragua	Ismael García	Primero Justicia
Aragua	Delson Guarate	Voluntad Popular
Barinas	Freddy Superlano	Voluntad Popular
Barinas	Julio César Reyes	Avanzada Progresista
Barinas	Wilmer Azuaje	Primero Justicia
Barinas	Andrés Eloy Camejo	Acción Democrática
Barinas	Frenchy Díaz	Primero Justicia
Barinas	Fernando Monsalve Cermeño	Copei
Barinas	Francisco Betancourt	Copei
Barinas	Neyl Arévalo	Independent
Bolívar	Andrés Velásquez	La Causa Radical
Bolívar	Francisco Sucre	Voluntad Popular
Bolívar	Simón Andarcia	Vente Venezuela
Bolívar	Noel Vargas	Copei
Bolívar	Jorge Carvajal Morales	Acción Democrática
Bolívar	Raúl Yusef Díaz	Independiente
Bolívar	César Ramírez	Voluntad Popular
Carabobo	Vicenzo "Enzo" Scarano	Cuentas Claras
Carabobo	Alejandro Feo La Cruz	Voluntad Popular
Carabobo	Armando Amengual	Primero Justicia
Carabobo	Rubén Limas	Acción Democrática
Cojedes	Denny Fernández	Acción Democrática
Cojedes	Ramón Moncada	Copei
Delta Amacuro	Larissa González	Acción Democrática
Delta Amacuro	José Antonio España	Primero Justicia
Falcón	José Gregorio Graterol	Primero Justicia
Falcón	Elisanower Depool	Avanzada Progresista
Falcón	José Amalio Graterol	Vente Venezuela
Falcón	Luis Stefanelli	Un Nuevo Tiempo
Guárico	Yovanny Salazar	Voluntad Popular
Guárico	Pedro Loreto	Acción Democrática
Lara	José Barreras	Avanzada Progresista
Lara	Henri Falcón	Avanzada Progresista
Lara	Alfredo Ramos	La Causa R
Lara	Luis Florido	Voluntad Popular
Lara	Alfonso Marquina	Primero Justicia
Lara	Orlando Fernández Medina	Un Nuevo Tiempo
Lara	Sobella Mejías	Acción Democrática
Mérida	Carlos García	Primero Justicia
Mérida	Ramón Guevara	Acción Democrática
Mérida	Carlos Ramos Rivas	Un Nuevo Tiempo
Mérida	Arquimidez Fajardo	Copei
Mérida	Jesús Rondón Nucete	Independent
Mérida	Omar Lares	Independent
Mérida	Pedro Izarra	Independent
Mérida	Lawrence Castro	Voluntad Popular
Mérida	Gabriel Manfredi	Voluntad Popular
Miranda	María Corina Machado	Vente Venezuela
Miranda	Adriana D'Elia	Primero Justicia
Miranda	Carlos Ocariz	Primero Justicia
Miranda	David Smolansky	Voluntad Popular
Monagas	Warner Jiménez	Voluntad Popular
Monagas	María Gabriela Hernández	Voluntad Popular
Monagas	Guillermo Call	Alianza Bravo Pueblo
Monagas	Luis Eduardo Martínez	Acción Democrática
Nueva Esparta	Alfredo Díaz	Acción Democrática
Nueva Esparta	Richard Fermín	Primero Justicia
Nueva Esparta	Morel Rodríguez Ávila	Copei
Portuguesa	Edgar Miranda	Acción Democrática
Portuguesa	Héctor Lameda	Copei
Portuguesa	Ivelisa Martínez	Acción Democrática
Portuguesa	Ivan Colmenarez	Voluntad Popular
Portuguesa	María Beatriz Martínez	Primero Justicia
Portuguesa	Carlos Eduardo Herrera	Un Nuevo Tiempo
Portuguesa	José Ruiz Parra	Proyecto Venezuela
Portuguesa	Manuel Suárez	Avanzada Progresista
Portuguesa	Mara Rodríguez	Voluntad Popular
Sucre	César Rincones	Acción Democrática
Sucre	Robert Alcalá	Acción Democrática
Sucre	Hermes García	Primero Justicia
Sucre	Francisco Bellorín	Voluntad Popular
Táchira	César Pérez Vivas	Copei
Táchira	Daniel Ceballos	Voluntad Popular
Táchira	Abelardo Díaz	Primero Justicia
Táchira	Fernando Andrade	Copei
Táchira	Virginia Vivas	Copei
Táchira	Onésimo Duarte	Acción Democrática
Trujillo	Marcos Montilla	Primero Justicia
Trujillo	José Karkom	Voluntad Popular
Trujillo	Manuel Aguilar Parilli	Primero Justicia
Trujillo	Francisco González Cruz	Voluntad Popular
Trujillo	Iraly Guerrero	Avanzada Progresista
Vargas	José Manuel Olivares	Primero Justicia
Vargas	Roberto Smith	Voluntad Popular
Yaracuy	Biagio Pilieri	Convergencia
Yaracuy	Gabriel Gallo	Voluntad Popular
Yaracuy	Luis Parra	Primero Justicia
Yaracuy	Nelson Suárez	Copei
Zulia	Pablo Pérez Álvarez	Un Nuevo Tiempo
Zulia	Eveling Trejo de Rosales	Un Nuevo Tiempo
Zulia	Eliseo Fermín	Un Nuevo Tiempo
Zulia	Enrique Márquez	Un Nuevo Tiempo
Zulia	Lester Toledo	Voluntad Popular
Zulia	Juan Pablo Guanipa	Primero Justicia
Zulia	Mervin Méndez	Copei
