= 2012 Democratic Unity Roundtable presidential primary =

- 12 February 2012
- Registered: 17,947,999
- Turnout: 3,079,284 (17.16%)
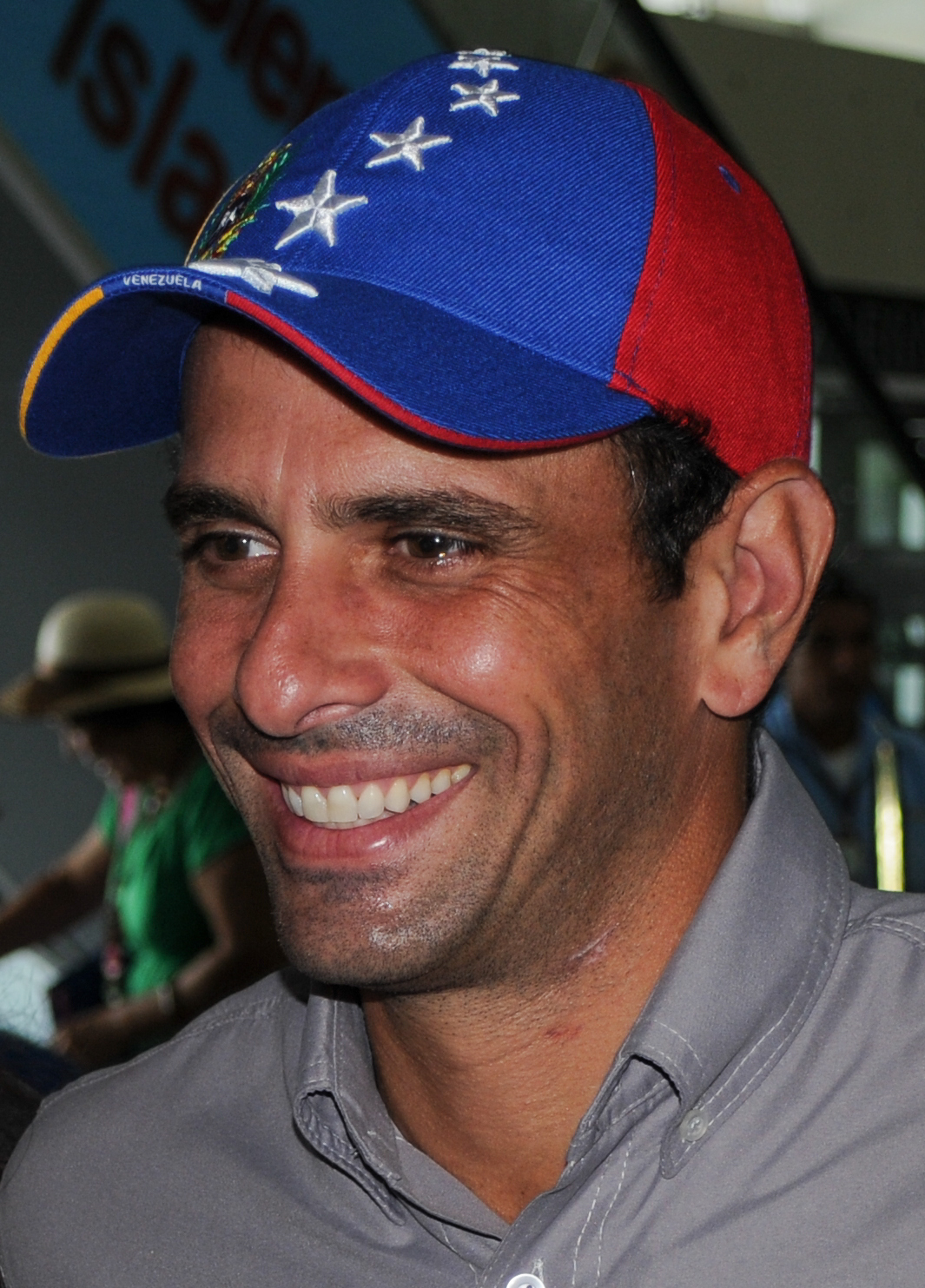

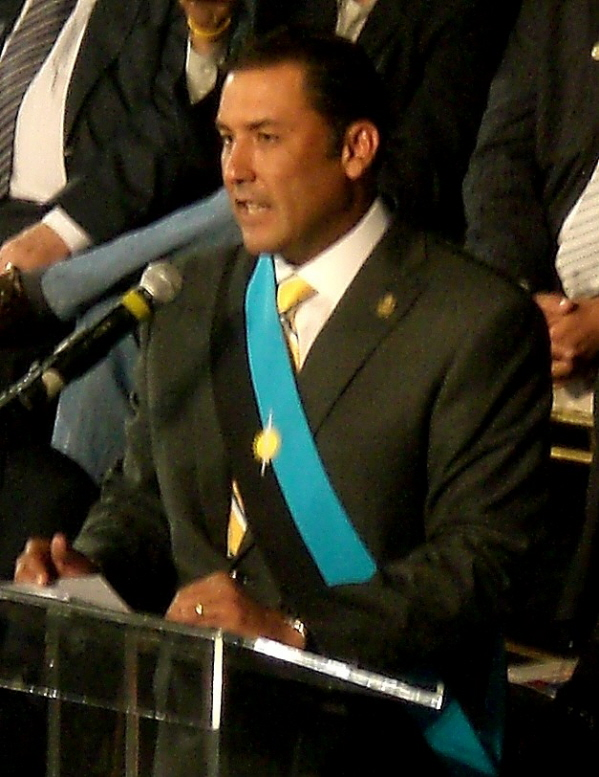
| Nominee | Henrique Capriles | Pablo Pérez Álvarez |
| Party | PJ | UNT |
| Alliance | Tricolor Bloc | Social Democratic Bloc |
| Popular vote | 1,923,524 | 899,385 |
| Percentage | 62.47% | 29.21% |
- Results by state
Previous Presidential nominee
Manuel Rosales
UNT
Presidential nominee
Henrique Capriles
PJ

The primary elections of the Unity Roundtable were held on 12 February 2012, and determined the presidential candidate of the Democratic Unity Roundtable (MUD) for the 2012 Venezuelan presidential election, which were held on October 7, As well as their candidates in the coming regional and municipal elections, to be held in December 2012 and December 2013 respectively. These were the first open presidential primaries in the history of Venezuela, and the largest of its kind and in participation in world history.

The selection process was through open primary elections, for which any Venezuelan citizen could vote, regardless of their membership in some of the political parties that make up the MUD. Similarly, politicians without membership in this coalition could participate in them, although they must register a certain number of signatures. In addition, all candidates are required to deposit a sum of money to pay 45% of the expenses that the National Electoral Council (CNE) requires to organize the primaries, the rest will be paid by the political parties of the MUD.

The registration process for presidential candidates was held between November 1 and 3, 2011, and was attended by six politicians (in order of registration): Leopoldo López, María Corina Machado, Henrique Capriles Radonski, Pablo Pérez, Pablo Medina and Diego Arria. On January 24, 2012, López declined his candidacy in favor of Capriles Radonski.

== Presidential primaries ==
=== Pre-Candidates ===
The presidential candidates of the Unit's Bureau were registered between the first 3 days of November 2011, for the primary election to be held on February 12, 2012. This election had five candidates. Prior to the nominations, other political leaders and national and regional personalities declined, including: Antonio Ledezma, César Pérez Vivas, Cecilia Sosa and Oswaldo Álvarez Paz. After the registration process, the MUD Primary Electoral Commission decided not to admit Pablo Medina's nomination, since he did not have the necessary resources to help finance the primaries; But later he was admitted, after he committed to contribute what he could, claiming to be a man of few resources of union origin. On January 24, 2012, Leopoldo López announces the resignation of his candidacy to support Henrique Capriles.

In the case of the Unit Presidential primaries (a political group opposed to Hugo Chávez), a presidential candidate, a candidate for one of the two metropolitan mayoralties, a candidate for 18 of the 24 governorates, and a candidate for 276 of the 335 municipalities. Candidatures for the Caracas Metropolitan Mayor's Office, the six remaining governorships, and the other 59 mayors were selected by consensus.

The presidential candidate of the Unit's Bureau will face Hugo Chávez in the presidential election on October 7, 2012. Instead, candidates for governor and mayor of the Bureau of Unity will do so mainly against the candidates of the PSUV in The regional elections of 16 December 2012 and the municipal elections of April 2013.

=== Opinion polls ===
| Source | Date | Sample | Void/Null | | | | | | | NS/NR |
|---|---|---|---|---|---|---|---|---|---|---|
| Source | Date | Sample | Void/Null | Diego Arria | Henrique Capriles | Leopoldo López | María Corina Machado | Pablo Medina | Pablo Pérez | NS/NR |
| Consultores 21 | Finales de diciembre, 2011 | - | - | N/A | 56,0 % | 13,8 % | 2,4 % | N/A | 16,8 % | - |
| IVAD | 10-17 november, 2011 | 1200 | - | 1,3 % | 25,7 % | 11,2 % | 2,8 % | N/A | 17,6 % | 41,4 % |
| Varianzas | 5-17 november, 2011 | 1900 | - | N/A | 43 % | 15 % | 3 % | N/A | 35 % | 4 % |
| Keller & Asociados | octubre-3 november, 2011 | 1200 | - | N/A | 43 % | 9 % | 10 % | N/A | 15 % | - |
| IVAD | 10-17 october, 2011 | 1200 | - | N/A | 26 % | 10,1 % | 4,1 % | N/A | 16,2 % | 38,6 % |
| Datanálisis | 19-28 september, 2011 | 1300 | - | N/A | 35,6 % | 20,2 % | 5,1 % | N/A | 18,4 % | - |
| Hinterlaces | 10 february, 2012 | 1000 | - | 2 % | 66 % | - | 6 % | 1 % | 25 % | - |

== Participation ==
The Bureau of the Unit reported a participation of 3,059,024 voters, 16.5% of the electoral roll, which was well above the estimate that several analysts had stated; 11 the general consensus was that a 10% participation would be considered a success. Journalist Eleazar Díaz Rangel, editor of the newspaper Últimas Noticias, had declared a week earlier that it was very likely that the participation would be around one million voters. The president of the GIS XXI polling station, Jesse Chacón, who has been a minister Of Chavez in several portfolios, said that the opposition could not win Chávez if he did not get more than two and a half million votes. Television presenter Mario Silva initially stated that the primaries were not going to take place, but a few days before of them said that if they were held, less than 500 thousand people would vote.

According to Teresa Albanes, a spokeswoman for the Bureau of Unity, the percentage of Venezuelans abroad was the highest ever recorded. She highlighted the fact that more people voted than in the 2010 PSUV primaries, Government party, this time 900,000 people voted, although they were closed primaries for a parliamentary election.

On 14 February, the Supreme Court of Justice ordered the Unity Bureau to be given the ballot papers to review, since some candidates and sectors classified the number of voters as "fraud" even though the same court had Declared two years before the data of the electoral notebooks are confidential. A student of the Bolivarian University of Aragua, Arnaldo Espinoza, was run over by a crane of the state police while he was observing the opposition protest to the order of the TSJ. Hours later police officers would confirm the student's death in a Maracay clinic. The next day, the notebooks were burned by the Unit's Bureau to guarantee the confidentiality of the data in contempt of the order of the TSJ.

== See also ==
- Democratic Unity Roundtable state primaries, 2012
