= 2012 Democratic Unity Roundtable state primaries =

The Venezuelan Democratic Unity Roundtable held state primaries in order to choose its candidates for local offices including state governors and mayors on February 12, 2012.

According to the MUD regulations, if an incumbent gubernatorial governor decides to re-elect, he can do so without having to measure himself in primaries, unless the political forces that obtained 55% of the opposition's votes in the entity in the last parliamentary elections are against. In this way, the realization of primaries in some states currently governed by the Venezuelan opposition is not expected.

On Friday, November 4, 2011, the Bureau of Democratic Unity (MUD) decided by consensus on December 16, 2012, the candidacies in 6 states (Zulia, Lara, Táchira, Nueva Esparta, Carabobo and Amazonas) and the Metropolitan District of Caracas.

== Candidates for state governors and mayors of their capitals ==
State	United Candidate (Governor) Party	Capital Municipality	United Candidate (Mayor) Party
Caracas	Antonio Ledezma (consensus); Alianza Bravo Pueblo	Caracas; Municipio Libertador	Ismael García (primarias){a} PODEMOS
Amazonas	Liborio Guarulla (consensus); Patria Para Todos	Puerto Ayacucho; Municipio Atures	Adriana González (Consensus){b} Patria Para Todos
Anzoátegui	Antonio Barreto Sira (primarias); Acción Democrática	Barcelona; Municipio Simón Bolívar	Carlos Andrés Michelangeli (primarias); Acción Democrática
Apure	Luis Lippa (primarias); Fuerza Ciudadana	San Fernando de Apure; Municipio San Fernando	Efraín Yadala (primarias); Acción Democrática
Aragua	Richard Mardo (primarias); Primero Justicia	Maracay; Municipio Atanasio Girardot	Tonny Real (primarias); PODEMOS
Barinas	Julio César Reyes (primarias); Gente Emergente	Barinas; Municipio Barinas	José Luis Machin (primarias); Independiente
Bolívar	Andrés Velásquez (primarias); La Causa Radical	Ciudad Bolívar; Municipio Heres	Víctor Fuenmayor (consensus); La Causa R
Carabobo	Henrique Salas Feo (consensus); Proyecto Venezuela	Valencia; Municipio Valencia	Michelle Cocchiola (primarias); Independiente
Cojedes	Alberto Galíndez (primarias); Acción Democrática	San Carlos; Municipio Ezequiel Zamora	Ramón Moncada (consensus); COPEI
Delta Amacuro	Arévalo Salazar (primarias); Movimiento al Socialismo	Tucupita; Municipio Tucupita	Omer Figueredo (primarias); COPEI
Falcón	Gregorio Graterol (primarias); Independiente	Coro; Municipio Miranda	Víctor Jurado (primarias); Primero Justicia
Guárico	José Manuel González de Tovar (primarias); Independiente	San Juan de los Morros; Municipio Juan Germán Roscio	Douglas Gonzales (primarias); Un Nuevo Tiempo
Lara	Henri Falcón (consensus); Patria Para Todos	Barquisimeto; Municipio Iribarren	Alfredo Ramos (primarias); La Causa R
Mérida	Léster Rodríguez (primarias); COPEI	Mérida; Municipio Libertador	Carlos García (primarias); Primero Justicia
Miranda	Carlos Ocariz (primarias){c} Primero Justicia	Los Teques; Municipio Guacaipuro	Romulo Herrera (primarias); Un Nuevo Tiempo
Monagas	Soraya Hernández (primarias){d} Independiente	Maturín; Municipio Maturín	Warner Jiménez (primarias); Voluntad Popular
Nueva Esparta	Morel Rodríguez Ávila (consensus); Acción Democrática	La Asunción; Municipio Arismendi	Richard Fermín (consensus); Primero Justicia
Portuguesa	Iván Colmenares (primarias); Independiente	Guanare; Municipio Guanare	Francisco Mora (primarias); Proyecto Venezuela
Sucre	Hernán Núñez (primarias); Voluntad Popular	Cumaná; Municipio Sucre	Roberto Alcala (primarias); Acción Democrática
Táchira	César Pérez Vivas (consensus); COPEI	San Cristóbal; Municipio San Cristóbal	Daniel Ceballos (primarias); Voluntad Popular
Trujillo	José Hernández (primarias); Acción Democrática	Trujillo; Municipio Trujillo	Luis Briceño (primarias); Acción Democrática
Vargas	José Manuel Olivares (primarias); Un Nuevo Tiempo	La Guaira; Municipio Vargas	Fabiola Colmenares (primarias); Voluntad Popular
Yaracuy	Biagio Pilieri (primarias); Convergencia Nacional	San Felipe; Municipio San Felipe	José de la Cruz (primarias); Convergencia Nacional
Zulia	Pablo Pérez Álvarez (consensus){e} Un Nuevo Tiempo	Maracaibo; Municipio Maracaibo	Eveling Trejo de Rosales (consensus){f} Un Nuevo Tiempo
