= 2017 Venezuelan regional elections =

- 15 October 2017

23 governorships
- Registered: 18,082,006
- Turnout: 61.05% (▲7.11pp)
Alliance	GPPSB	MUD
Popular vote	5,817,344	4,984,830
Percentage	52.69%	45.15%
Swing	▼2.53pp	▲0.37pp
Governors	18	5
Governors +/–	▼2	▲2
- Red denotes states won by the Great Patriotic Pole. Blue denotes those won by the Coalition for Democratic Unity.

Regional elections were held in Venezuela on 15 October 2017 to elect the executive position of all 23 federal entities. This marked the first state executive election not held on the same date as elections for state legislatures, and the second time that regional elections were held separately from municipal elections. They were the 9th regional elections held in Venezuela since 1989.

The two main participants were the Democratic Unity Roundtable (MUD) opposition coalition and the Great Patriotic Pole (GPP) alliance of the ruling Bolivarian government. The election resulted in a victory for the GPP, which won 18 out of the 23 governorships, while the MUD won the remaining five. Four Democratic Action opposition governors elected decided to be sworn in under the GPP government-led National Constituent Assembly despite promises to never recognize the body.

== Irregularities ==
=== Delayed elections ===
Controversy arose on whether the election would be held or not since the National Electoral Council (CNE) had not determined a date two months ahead of the expected election date in December 2016. Some believed that the delay was due to the belief that if elections were held, the ruling party, the United Socialist Party of Venezuela (PSUV), would suffer one of its largest losses in over a decade. In July 2016, a possible election date of 11 December was discussed but never confirmed by authorities. Luis Emilio Rondón, the leader of the National Electoral Council (CNE), explained that the CNE has received complaints related to delays in the setting up of the polling stations and the arrival of their staff, as well as "technical problems with voting machines".

On 18 October 2016, the president of the National Electoral Council (CNE), Tibisay Lucena, stated that regional elections would not be held until mid-2017, stating the delay was due to a so-called "economic war" and low oil prices. Government sources stated that the true reason of the delay was hope that higher oil prices would raise the popularity of the PSUV.

Lucena finally announced on 23 May 2017 that elections were to be held on 10 December 2017. However, during the 5th session of the 2017 Constituent Assembly of Venezuela, it was later suggested to move the elections to October 2017. In September 2017, 15 October 2017 was selected as the date for regional elections.

=== Relocation of voting centers ===
Luis Emilio Rondón denounced several irregularities throughout the campaign, which were also criticized by the opposition and governments such as Canada and the United States, and considered that the electoral body has taken several illegal measures aimed at demobilizing voters in areas identified as opposition strongholds. The Democratic Unity Roundtable issued a statement declaring:

The abrupt changes of voting centers is a technique known as crazy mouse used by the Nicaraguan government to confuse opposition voters. Since 2006, when Daniel Ortega came to power in Nicaragua, all elections have been fraudulent through the use of various mechanisms, including shock groups similar to the colectivos. This is widely known by the international community.

— Democratic Unity Roundtable

They claimed Daniel Ortega and First Lady Rosario Murillo were allies of president Nicolás Maduro and that "both have now become in the principal advisors of Maduro in the organization of electoral frauds". In a statement, the MUD demanded the Executive Branch the immediate expulsion of Nicaraguan advisors and asked the Organization of American States (OAS) and the governments of the region to demand Nicaragua not to meddle in the internal affairs of Venezuela, saying that "we reject the participation of Nicaragua in any initiative related with the situation of Venezuela". Liliana Hernández, electoral coordinator of the MUD, denounced that the CNE did not allow international observers and did not accredit the Venezuelan Electoral Observatory for the accompaniment during the regional elections.

The relocation happened in less than 72 hours of the election at more than 250 voting centers, many of which were located in traditionally opposition zones. Due to the relocation of voting centers by the government, some middle class Venezuelans who supported the opposition were forced to vote in poor communities filled with crime, deterring voter participation in some cases. Three days before elections, the government-led CNE changed hundreds of voting locations affecting over 700,000 voters in predominately opposition areas, publishing a table with the affected polling stations. The Miranda and Mérida states were the most affected, with 232,428 and 129,520 voters, respectively. The CNE cited security reasons, though opposition members believe the move was to cause confusion and prevent voter participation.

=== Broadcasting ===
Rondón also criticized the state television network, Venezolana de Televisión, for transmitting pro-government messages, which is forbidden by law. He described it as "regretful" that the network "is violating the electoral regulations".

=== Ineligible candidates ===
The CNE refused to remove MUD politicians who had lost primaries before the election from boards that voter would choose from. Venezuelans seeking to vote for an opposition candidate had the possibility of voting for an ineligible candidate out of confusion.

=== Election day ===
Venezuelans chanting "We have to vote" at a voting center closed by the government.

Although the Venezuelan Electoral Observatory declared that "there are incidents but these are more isolated than generalized", it still reported several irregularities, including reports of absence of witnesses in voting centers, that the CNE web portal still had outdated data on the relocation of polling stations, that Carlos Ocariz, candidate for the Miranda state, postponed his right to vote because he was attacked, and that a polling stating located in Palo Verde, Caracas, asked voters to pass by a "red point" of the United Socialist Party (PSUV) to verify their information after voting.

During the elections there was refusal by the Plan República and board members for media to cover the process. In the Fermín Toro school of Valencia one of the electoral witnesses denounced that their credential was taken away by an official after taking photos of the center. Until the dawn, the System of Public Media transmitted electoral propaganda of the pro-government candidates, violating the electoral norm. In Los Teques, several electoral boards opened late and with accidental members (voters waiting in line and board witnesses).

Daniel Ascanio, president of the Federation of Student Centers of the Simón Bolívar University, declared that government supporters took control of the largest polling stating in Guarenas to prevent voters to cast their ballot. Despite that at 10:00am VST the MUD registered more than 620 irregular incidents, the opposition coalition assured that the complaints still represented a low percentage and they were being dealt with regionally to solve the problems. Minister of Defense Padrino López reported the commission of 26 alleged electoral crimes, while Foro Penal reported 15 related arrests, including one for taking a picture of the electoral ballot. Most of the detainees were released.

Election ink was not used like in previous elections. In several polling stations, power outages and failing voter machines led to longer than expected wait times for voters. Pro-government colectivos were seen riding motorcycles near voting centers in some cities; Eduardo Vale, a MUD councilor of Maracaibo, denounced that with Molotov cocktails were thrown at one center. Journalists were reportedly assaulted in Trujillo and Zulia.

=== Results ===
The Democratic Unity Roundtable issued a statement setting a position and denouncing the several irregularities during the process, among which were:

1. An electoral population of at least 1,000,080 voters was prevented or hindered from voting in centers historically favorable to the opposition by damaged machines, boards that did not open or that had unjustified delays until late at night.
2. That more than 700 thousand Venezuelans migrated from their centers 48 hours before and even on the day of the election.
3. An affected electoral population of at least 350,000 citizens were affected by violence and intimidation inside and outside the electoral centers, which prevented or hindered the free exercise of the vote.
4. At least 90,537 votes that should have been awarded to opposition candidates were annulled as a result of the impediment of replacing candidates already retired in fraud to the law.
5. Coercion and blackmail of public employees and beneficiaries of social programs forcing them to vote with the accompaniment of PSUV leaders and through the Carnet de la Patria, which prevents the exercise of a free vote.
6. Voters that exercised multiple votes and disrespecting the principle "one elector one vote", facilitated by the absence of indelible ink for the first time in history.
7. Irregular extensions after the time of the legal closure.
8. Obstruction of the audits of the citizen verification process, which impeded the verification of the consistency between the votes cast and the results transmitted.
9. Numeric inconsistency of historic electoral results as well as with all the studies, polls and exit polls carried out.

The National Electoral Council published results for Bolívar on its website confirming the victory of the opposition candidate, then deleted them hours later. The opposition candidate to the Bolívar state governorship, Andrés Velásquez, announced before the CNE counted the voters that the results that showed him as the winner were "irreversible", declaring having 100% of the ballots, pointing out that the CNE did not count them to try to revert the obtained advantage and assuring that until the moment he had 50.42% of the adjudicated votes, while the Socialist Party had 49.58%, 268,361 votes. On 18 October, Velásquez denounced the appointment of candidate Justo Noguera Pietri to the governorship as "fraud", claiming the existence of invalid ballots. The same day, parliamentarian Enrique Márquez showed comparisons of the voting records from several voting boards with the results shown by the CNE, in which they subtracted votes from Andrés Velásquez and added votes to Justo Noguera Pietri, including a board showing a participation percentage of 96.67%.

In the evening, spokesman for the MUD Ramon Guillermo Aveledo stated that opposition candidates elected into office would not subordinate to the Constituent National Assembly, saying "The Constitution is in force and says that the governor is sworn in before the Legislative Council". Minutes before Tibisay Lucena announced preliminary results, the MUD advised voters that the CNE had different results than the ones calculated by observers.

The substitutions that are our right and are established in the constitution were not allowed illegally. With 48 hours left for the boards to be installed the CNE unscrupulously and illegally made a move and changed the voting centers to 225 thousand Mirandinos.

— Carlos Ocariz

The opposition candidate Carlos Ocariz declared that he would not recognize Héctor Rodríguez, his rival candidate, as governor of Miranda. As part of the complaints made by the opposition candidate, he explained that for example in 403 centers out of 1118 "we could not connect with the witnesses because they shut down the telephone lines". He described having "all the acts and we are reviewing them. But it is not a matter only of acts " since "in many voting centers they took our witnesses by force". He explained that "the substitutions that are our right and are established in the constitution were not allowed illegally. With 48 hours left for the boards to be installed the CNE unscrupulously and illegally made a move and changed the voting centers to 225 thousand Mirandinos". He also explained that they did a re-engineering with the centers relocation and that "it affected the results remarkably". He added that the persons that were mobilized in buses to the relocated centers were assaulted and beaten, and that violence was used as a tool to prevent the vote. "We saw the massification of the multiple vote as there was no indelible ink", adding that Venezuela currently faces "an absolutely fraudulent system". "There are numerical inconsistencies between the polls and the election results."

== Public opinion ==
Graphical summary

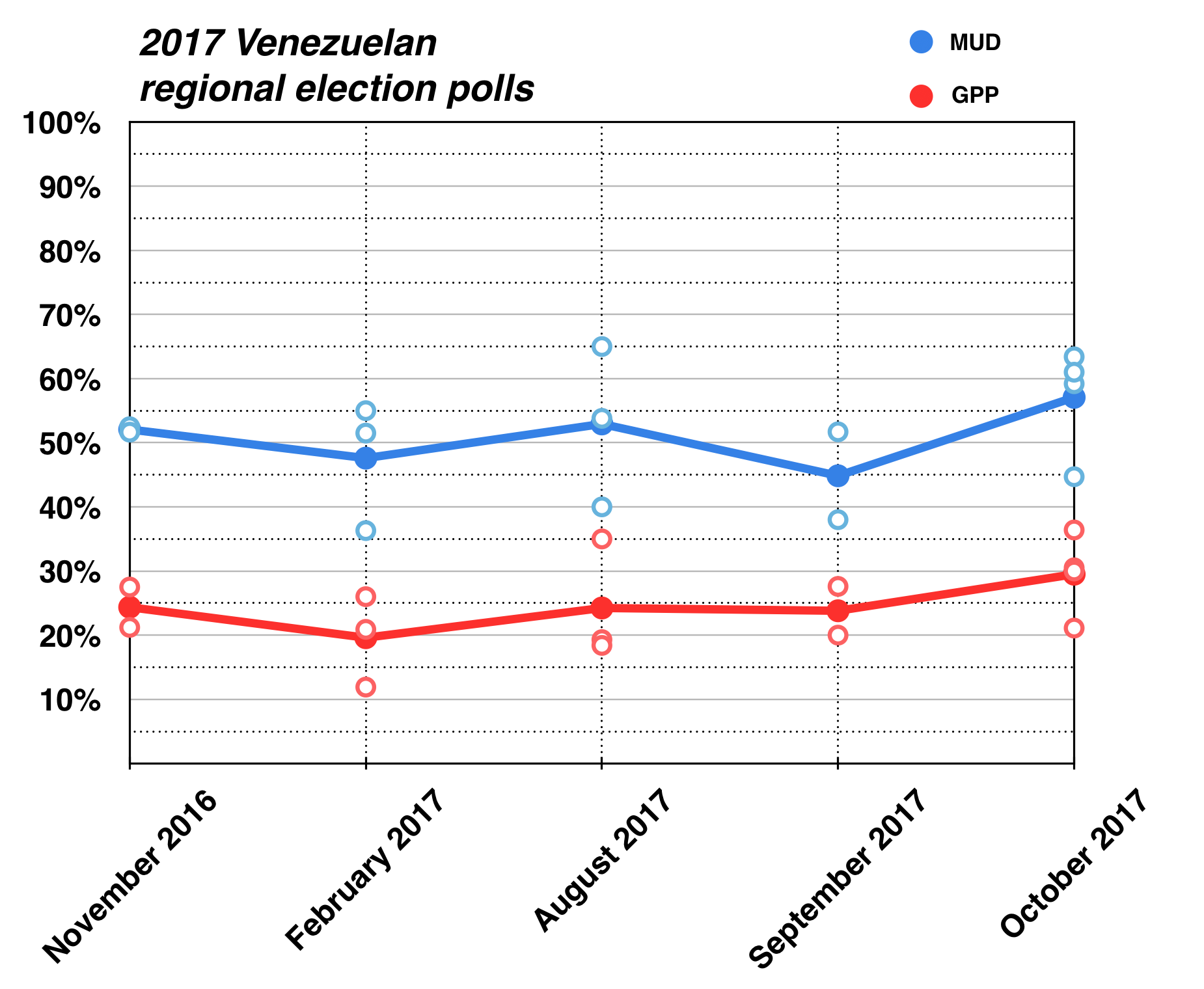
The blue line represents percentage that favor MUD. The red line represents percentage that favor GPP. Unfilled dots represent individual results of the polls seen below.

Poll results are listed in the tables below in chronological order and using the date the survey's fieldwork was done, as opposed to the date of publication. If such date is unknown, the date of publication is given instead. The highest percentage figure in each polling survey is displayed in bold, and the background shaded in the leading party's colour.

Date(s) conducted	Polling organization	Sample size	MUD	GPP	Undecided	Lead
Aug 2016	Datincorp	1,199	47%	20%	31%	27%
12–24 Nov 2016	Venebarometro	1,200	52.5%	27.5%	6.5%	25%
15–30 Nov 2016	Hercon	1,200	51.65%	21.21%	11.03%	30.44%
20 Jan – 6 Feb 2017	Hercon	1,200	51.5%	20.9%	12.5%	30.6%
28 Jan – 8 Feb 2017	Venebarometro	1,200	55%	26%	19%	29%
9–27 Feb 2017	Meganalisis	1,150	36.3%	11.9%	27.9%	24.4%
15–30 April 2017	Hercon	1,200	65.5%	17.2%	11.1%	48.3%
Aug 2017	Delphos	–	65%	35%	–	30%
1–5 Aug 2017	Hercon	1,000	40%	18.4%	5.2%	21.6%
20–29 Aug 2017	Hercon	1,200	53.8%	19.3%	5.3%	34.5%
Sept 2017	Delphos	–	38%	20%	23%	18%
1–20 Sept 2017	Venebarometro	1,500	51.7%	27.6%	20.7%	24.1%
Oct 2017	Datanalisis	–	44.7%	21.1%	–	23.6%
Oct 2017	Ecoanalítica	–	63.4%	36.4%	–	27.0%
Oct 2017	Poder y Estrategia	-	61%	30%	2%	31%
Oct 2017	Hercon	1,000	59.2%	30.5%	8.3%	28.7%

== Results ==
=== Preliminary ===
Most voted opposition parties in each state. Acción Democrática Primero Justicia COPEI Avanzada Progresista Voluntad Popular Un Nuevo Tiempo

According to Lucena, the MUD opposition coalition had only won 5 of 22 governorships in Venezuela – Anzoátegui, Mérida, Nueva Esparta, Táchira and Zulia – in what she called "irreversible results", while the GPP alliance of the Bolivarian government had won the remaining 17. There was no word on the results of the final state, Bolívar.

=== Final results ===
State	GPP candidate	%	MUD candidate	%
Amazonas	Miguel Rodríguez	60.09%	Bernabé Gutiérrez	31.08%
Anzoátegui	Aristóbulo Isturiz	47.06%	Antonio Barreto Sira	51.69%
Apure	Ramón Carrizales	52.13%	José Montilla	31.79%
Aragua	Rodolfo Marco Torres	57.02%	Ismael García	39.43%
Barinas	Argenis Chávez	53.11%	Freddy Superlano	44.14%
Bolívar	Justo Noguera	49.09%	Andrés Velásquez	48.83%
Carabobo	Rafael Lacava	52.75%	Alejandro Feo La Cruz	45.62%
Cojedes	Margaud Godoy	55.68%	Alberto Galindez	42.71%
Delta Amacuro	Lisetta Hernández	60.24%	Larissa González	38.14%
Falcón	Víctor Clark	52.44%	Eliézer Sirit	43.93%
Guárico	José Vásquez	61.77%	Pedro Loreto	37.29%
Lara	Carmen Meléndez	58.33%	Henri Falcón	40.27%
Mérida	Jehyson Guzmán	46.54%	Ramón Guevara	50.82%
Miranda	Héctor Rodríguez	52.78%	Carlos Ocariz	45.67%
Monagas	Yelitza Santaella	54.07%	Guillermo Call	43.83%
Nueva Esparta	Carlos Mata Figueroa	47.40%	Alfredo Díaz	51.87%
Portuguesa	Rafael Calles	64.51%	María Beatriz Martínez	32.94%
Sucre	Edwin Rojas	59.79%	Robert Alcalá	38.86%
Táchira	José Vielma Mora	35.41%	Laidy Gómez	63.27%
Trujillo	Henry Rangel Silva	59.75%	Carlos González	37.74%
Vargas	Jorge García Carneiro	52.98%	José Manuel Olivares	45.57%
Yaracuy	Julio León Heredia	62.13%	Luis Parra	35.56%
Zulia	Francisco Arias Cárdenas	47.38%	Juan Pablo Guanipa	51.35%

== Aftermath ==
Following the elections where the opposition only won five of twenty-three governorships, disillusionment with the opposition movement grew, especially after four of five opposition governors elected belonging to Democratic Action decided to be sworn in under the Bolivarian government-led National Constituent Assembly despite promises to never recognize the body.

== Reactions ==
=== Governments and supranational organisations ===
- The governments of Argentina, Brazil, Canada, Chile, Colombia, Costa Rica, Guatemala, Honduras, Mexico, Panama, Paraguay and Peru asked for an "independent audit" of the regional elections "in the face of the diverse obstacles, acts of intimidation, manipulation and irregularities that characterized the elections", with the order to clarify the controversy generated about the elections.
- European Union: Federica Mogherini, High Representative of the European Union for Foreign Affairs and Security Policy, was shown surprised by the results and expressed that "what really happened will have to be investigated". The president of the European Parliament, Antonio Tajani, pressured 28 foreign ministers to adopt sanctions against members of the Venezuelan government.
- Bolivia: President Evo Morales said "Congratulations Venezuela, for democracy won over intervention and conspiracy. The people defend their sovereignty, dignity and natural resources"
- Cuba: President Raúl Castro stated that Venezuela has given a "big lesson on peace, democratic vocation, courage and dignity"
- Canada: The government of Canada condemned the relocation of voting centers saying, "it prevents free and fair elections" and gives an advantage to the Bolivarian government.
- Israel: Before the elections, the spokesperson of the Israeli foreign ministry, Emmanuel Nahshon, issued a statement declaring that "Israel demands the Venezuelan government to allow the Venezuelan opposition to compete for their positions with freedom", to "protect the constitutional right of its citizens to vote and to guarantee that the regional elections are carried out in a free and transparent way respecting the prerogative of Venezuelans to design the model of country they want".
- United States: The United States Department of State assured that the regional elections were not "free", not "fair", and warned to continue pressuring "economically and diplomatically" the Nicolás Maduro government to "restore the democracy" in the country. Heather Nauert, State Department Spokesperson, issued a statement saying that "We condemn the lack of free and fair elections yesterday in Venezuela. The voice of the Venezuelan people wasn't heard."

=== Domestic ===
- Democratic Unity Roundtable (MUD): Gerardo Blyde, the head of the MUD campaign command, dismissed the results and reaffirmed the distrust of the results offered by the National Electoral Council.
- Venebarómetro: Edgar Gutiérrez, director of the pollster Venebarómetro, declared that "the results are absolutely inconsistent with all the polls that showed a chavismo in a frank minority".
- President Maduro responded to accusations of election fraud by saying that the election was "the most audited and secure in the world" and that "nobody can commit fraud".
- Henri Falcón and Alejandro Feo La Cruz, opposition candidates for the Lara and Carabobo states respectively, broke with the opposition coalition's official position conceding defeat in the elections; while denouncing irregularities in the process, they also regretted the abstention of many voters.

== See also ==
- State protector
