= 2008 Venezuelan regional elections =

- 23 November 2008

22 of 23 governorships 326 mayors 233 state legislators 13 councillors
- Registered: 16,845,061
- Turnout: 65.45% (▲19.75pp)
Alliance	GPPSB	MUD
Popular vote	5,758,494	4,623,051
Percentage	52.10%	41.82%
Swing	▼6.21pp	▲2.50pp
Governors	17	5
Governors +/–	▼3	▲3
- Red denotes states won by the Great Patriotic Pole. Blue denotes those won by the Coalition for Democratic Unity.

Regional elections were held in Venezuela on 23 November 2008 to choose 22 governors and 2 metropolitan mayors. The candidates were selected for a term beginning in 2008 and ending in 2012, when the next regional elections were held. The 2008 regional elections were the second during the government of Hugo Chávez Frías and the first since he founded the United Socialist Party of Venezuela.

The government of the state of Amazonas and nine municipalities were not chosen in this elections because they had been elected after the 2004 regional elections. The Venezuelan opposition managed to attain the metropolitan municipality of Caracas, won by candidate Antonio Ledezma, as well as five state governments; the United Socialist Party, meanwhile, won seventeen.

Henrique Capriles, the former mayor of the Baruta municipality, became the governor of Miranda, defeating the incumbent, Diosdado Cabello. Adán Chávez, president Hugo Chavéz's brother, became the governor of Barinas. In Carabobo, Henrique Salas Feo, the son of former presidential candidate Henrique Salas Römer, defeated his opponent Mario Silva to become the governor. Pablo Pérez Álvarez became the governor Zulia; he succeeded Manuel Rosales, who had governed from 2000 until 2008 and was a presidential candidate in 2006.

== Background ==
After losing the 2004 Venezuelan recall referendum, the opposition became determined to participate in the 2008 elections. Prior to the elections, the General Comptroller, a Chávez ally, banned almost 300 candidates who had been accused of corruption without making formal charges. Leopoldo López, a rising figure within the opposition who raised fears among the Chávez administration, was one of the hundreds of candidates barred from holding office. The Supreme Tribunal later ratified the bans and removed the candidates from the process.

In early January 2008, some opposition political parties expressed their willingness to sign a unitary agreement to run in the regional elections of November of that year. On 23 January, in commemoration of the 50th anniversary of the return of democracy to Venezuela, the coalition of National Unity (later known as the Democratic Unity Roundtable) was created, formed by the political parties A New Era (UNT), Justice First (PJ), Democratic Action (AD), Copei, Movement For Socialism (MAS), Radical Cause, Project Venezuela (PRVZL), Fearless People's Alliance (ABP) and Popular Vanguard (VP), reached an agreement committing to present joint candidates in all the states and municipalities of the country. Other political parties representing the more radical opposition such as Alianza Popular, Comando Nacional de la Resistencia and Frente Patriótico denounced at the beginning that they were excluded from the agreement.

With the document, called National Unity Agreement, they expected to seek unitary candidacies for the regional elections, besides proposing ten national objectives of their "vision of the country". The agreement also created a set of rules regarding decisions, including decisions being made by a majority of 3/5ths of members or 70% of the popular vote during election processes, the process to determine a joint candidate either through majority or a primary election and a unified policy framework. Many For Social Democracy (Podemos) leaders expressed their support to the presentation of joint candidacies with the Unity, such as Ricardo Gutiérrez and Ernesto Paraqueima, announcing that they would support the candidacies of the above mentioned agreement for governorships and mayorships. Ismael García, secretary general of Podemos and deputy for Aragua, announced on 29 April the support of his party to opposition candidates in the states of Lara and Miranda as well as in the Metropolitan District of Caracas for the regional elections.

== Candidates ==
The following list shows the three main candidates according to their political affiliation (government, opposition and dissident or independent) ordered by number of votes attained. The political affiliation is determined by the political parties supporting each candidate. For the 2008 elections, government candidates were supported by the United Socialist Party; opposition candidates were supported by either Justice First, Democratic Action or the Political Electoral Independent Organization Committee parties; and independent candidates were mostly supported by regional parties.

=== Metropolitan mayors ===
‡	Indicates the winning candidate

Metropolitan mayorship winners and candidates with affiliation, percentage and number of votes attained
Metropolitan Area	Affiliation	Candidate	%	Votes
Caracas	Opposition	Antonio Ledezma ‡	52.40	722,822
Caracas	Government	Aristóbulo Istúriz	44.94	619,622
Caracas	Independent	Augusto Uribe	1.97	27,281
Alto Apure	Government	Jorge Rodriguez ‡	55.92	21,381
Alto Apure	Independent	Elfar Angarita	20.86	7,979
Alto Apure	Opposition	Ignacio Barrillas	20.21	7,728

=== Governors ===
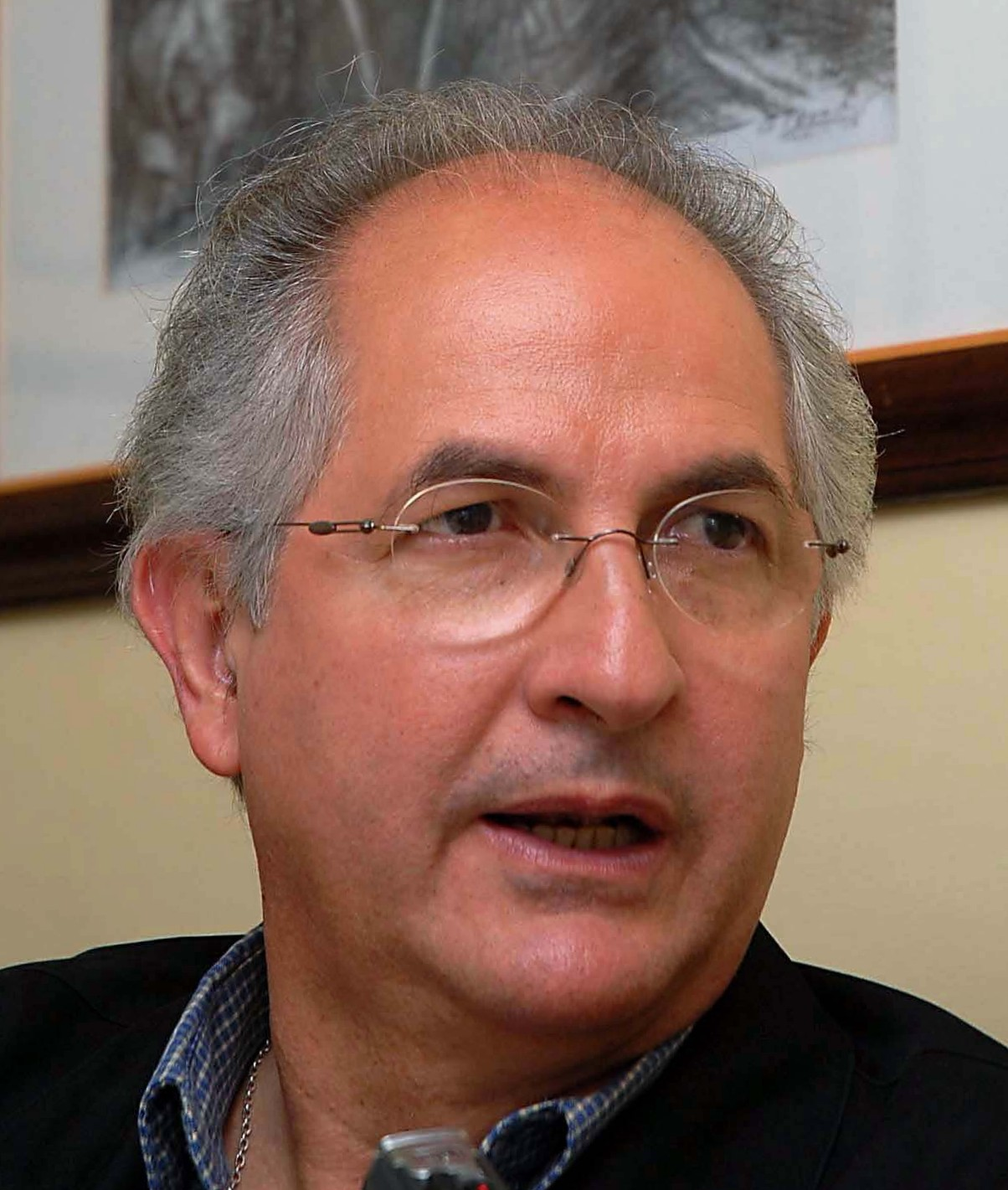
Antonio Ledezma became the mayor of the Metropolitan municipality of Caracas, defeating Aristóbulo Istúriz.

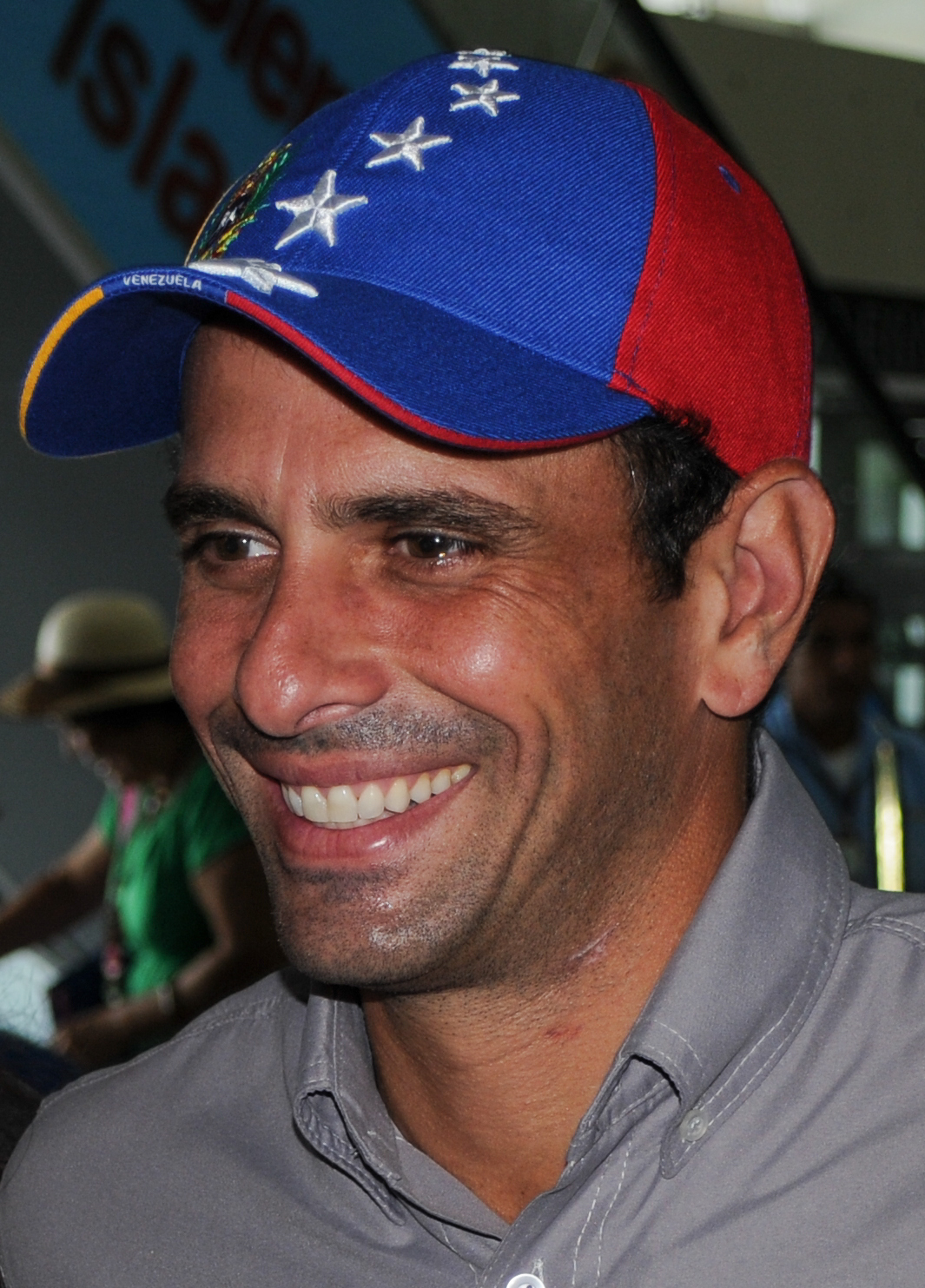
Henrique Capriles Radonski, whom became presidential candidate in 2012, defeated former vice-president and governor Diosdado Cabello to become the governor for the Miranda state.

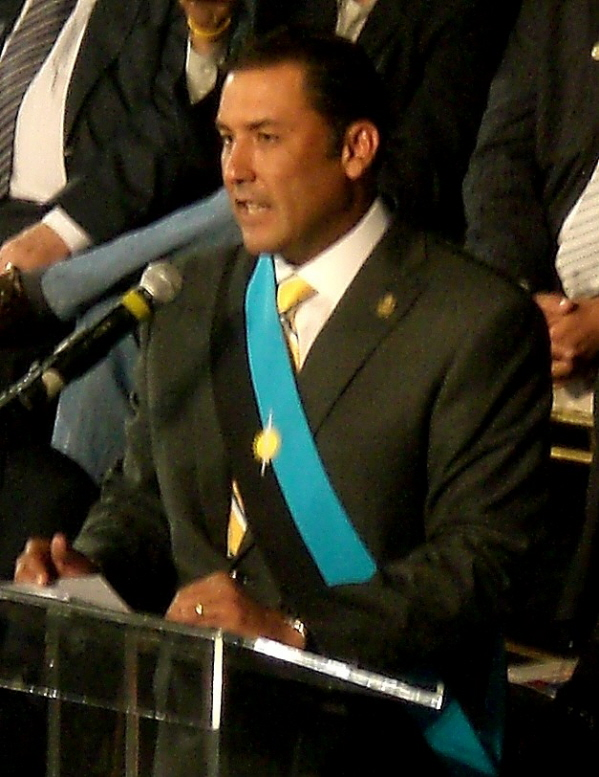
Pablo Pérez Álvarez defeated his adversary Gian Carlo di Martino and succeeded Manuel Rosales as governor of the Zulia state.

‡	Indicates the winning candidate

Governorship winners and candidates with affiliation, percentage and number of votes attained
State	Affiliation	Candidate	%	Votes
Anzoátegui	Government	Tarek William Saab ‡	55.09	311,344
Anzoátegui	Opposition	Gustavo Marcano	40.49	228,814
Anzoátegui	Independent	Benjamín Rausseo	3.34	18,879
Apure	Government	Jesús Aguilarte ‡	56.97	89,823
Apure	Opposition	Miriam de Montilla	26.43	41,673
Apure	Independent	Rafael Rojas	6.85	10,813
Aragua	Government	Rafael Isea ‡	58.92	382,845
Aragua	Opposition	Henry Rosales	39.81	258,684
Aragua	Independent	Luis Zapata	0.65	4,245
Barinas	Government	Adán Chávez ‡	50.48	148,353
Barinas	Independent	Julio César Reyes	43.95	129,143
Barinas	Opposition	Rafael Jiménez	4.93	14,506
Bolívar	Government	Francisco Rangel Gómez ‡	47.38	210,511
Bolívar	Opposition	Andrés Velásquez	30.69	136,378
Bolívar	Independent	Antonio Rojas Suarez	14.8	65,748
Carabobo	Opposition	Henrique Salas Feo ‡	47.50	407,520
Carabobo	Government	Mario Silva	44.52	381,950
Carabobo	Independent	Luis Felipe Acosta Carlez	6.56	56,290
Cojedes	Government	Teodoro Bolívar ‡	52.44	68,903
Cojedes	Opposition	Alberto Galíndez	39.59	52,015
Cojedes	Independent	Gonzalo Mujica	6.70	8,812
Delta Amacuro	Government	Lizeta Hernández ‡	55.80	36,965
Delta Amacuro	Independent	Pedro Santaella	25.23	16,716
Delta Amacuro	Opposition	Amado Heredia	14.45	9,578
Falcón	Government	Stella Lugo ‡	55.36	202,438
Falcón	Opposition	José Gregorio Graterol	44.40	162,359
Falcón	Independent	Jhonny Tovar	0.16	615
Guárico	Government	Willian Lara ‡	52.54	147,796
Guárico	Independent	Lenny Manuitt	33.20	93.393
Guárico	Opposition	Reynaldo Armas	13.42	37,759
Lara	Government	Henri Falcón ‡	73.52	448,536
Lara	Opposition	Pedro Pablo Alcántara	14.58	88,948
Lara	Independent	Fredy Andrade	8.89	54,251
Mérida	Government	Marcos Díaz Orellana ‡	55.04	196,667
Mérida	Opposition	Williams Dávila	44.70	159,728
Mérida	Independent	María Díaz	0.25	906
Miranda	Opposition	Henrique Capriles Radonski ‡	53.11	583,795
Miranda	Government	Diosdado Cabello	46.10	506,753
Miranda	Independent	Blanca Tamara Vargas	0.53	5,832
Monagas	Government	José Gregorio Briceño ‡	64.86	204,857
Monagas	Opposition	Domingo Urbina	15.02	47,437
Monagas	Independent	Ramon Fuentes	12.88	40,684
Nueva Esparta	Opposition	Morel Rodríguez ‡	57.53	112,516
Nueva Esparta	Government	William Fariñas	41.80	81,756
Nueva Esparta	Independent	Nelson Silva	0.48	955
Portuguesa	Government	Wilmar Castro ‡	58.22	185,271
Portuguesa	Opposition	Jobito Villegas	26.93	85,707
Portuguesa	Independent	Bella Petrizzo	14.49	46,110
Sucre	Government	Enrique Maestre ‡	56.51	204,665
Sucre	Opposition	Eduardo Morales Gil	42.21	152,870
Sucre	Independent	Armiche Padrón	0.58	2,110
Táchira	Opposition	César Pérez Vivas ‡	49.46	240,478
Táchira	Government	Leonardo Salcedo	48.12	233,995
Táchira	Independent	Rosa Velazco	1.28	6,242
Trujillo	Government	Hugo Cabezas ‡	59.96	170,770
Trujillo	Opposition	Enrique Catalán	26.30	74,905
Trujillo	Independent	Octaviano Mejía	13.22	37,666
Vargas	Government	Jorge García Carneiro ‡	61.57	83,937
Vargas	Opposition	Roberto Smith	32.19	44,939
Vargas	Independent	Carlos Mayora	2.81	3,925
Yaracuy	Government	Julio León ‡	57.83	130,659
Yaracuy	Opposition	Filippo Lapi	28.91	65,313
Yaracuy	Independent	Edward Capdevielle	9.97	22,534
Zulia	Opposition	Pablo Pérez Álvarez ‡	53.34	776,372
Zulia	Government	Gian Carlo di Martino	45.26	658,724
Zulia	Independent	Saady Bijani	0.71	10,423

== Aftermath ==
According to the American think tank Freedom House, from this election forward Venezuela ceased to be an electoral democracy, in part due to the disqualification of hundreds of opposition candidates on corruption charges by stating that "the separation of powers is nearly nonexistent" in Venezuela. According to journalist Rory Carroll, Chávez anticipated that the disqualifications would divide the opposition, though the opposition unified instead. After opposition candidate Antonio Ledezma was elected mayor of the Metropolitan district of Caracas, colectivo leader and Chávez ally Lina Ron occupied Caracas' city hall with the support of authorities. Chávez would later establish a "capital district" that remove mayoral powers from Ledezma.
