= Ronald Blanco La Cruz =

Venezuelan politician (born 1959)

Governor of Táchira
- In office 2000–2008
- Preceded by: Sergio Omar Calderón
- Succeeded by: César Pérez Vivas

Personal details
- Born: April 12, 1959 (age 67) Caracas
- Party: Partido Socialista Unido de Venezuela
- Spouse: Guadalupe de Blanco
- Education: Bolivarian Military University of Venezuela
- Profession: soldier, diplomat

Ronald Blanco La Cruz is a Venezuelan politician.

Táchira State Governor Election, 2004 Results
Source: CNE data

Candidates	Votes	%
Ronald Blanco La Cruz	169587	57%
Sergio Omar Calderón	117682	40%

== Biography ==
Ronald Blanco La Cruz was born in Caracas on April 12, 1959 to José Vicente Blanco and Ana Julia La Cruz. He spent his early years going to school in his birth city. In 1977 he received his Bachelor of Science degree. He later joined the Military Academy of Venezuela (Academia Militar de Venezuela) where he received a licence in Military Arts & Sciences in 1981. That same year, he was deployed to the Cuartel Bolívar del Táchira, a military base. Blanco is currently a retired captain of the Venezuelan Army and has a Master's degree in international relations and Company Management, obtaining both titles from Troy University in the United States. He has held various positions in the Táchira State, among them the director of the Maternal-Infantile Nourishing Program (Programa Alimentario Maternal Infantil, also known as PAMI). He was also a professor at the Universidad de los Andes. In 1999, he was elected to the National Constituent Assembly, where he served as the President of the Subcommission of Borders. From 2000 to 2008, Blanco La Cruz was governor of Táchira State.

== Personal life ==
Ronald Blanco is married and they have three children named Royma, Ronald, and Indira.

Preceded by Sergio Omar Calderón	Governor of Táchira; 2000–2008	Succeeded by César Pérez Vivas
