= Freddy Superlano =

Venezuelan politician

Member of the National Assembly of Venezuela for Barinas
- In office 5 January 2016 – 5 January 2021
- President: Juan Guaidó (disputed)

Personal details
- Born: Freddy Superlano Salinas; 25 June 1976 (age 49) Barinas, Venezuela
- Party: Popular Will; Democratic Action (previously)
- Occupation: Politician, educator, engineer

Freddy Superlano Salinas (born 25 June 1976) is a Venezuelan politician, educator and engineer who served as a member for the Popular Will party in the National Assembly from 2016 to 2021. He is an outspoken critic of Nicolás Maduro and the United Socialist Party of Venezuela. He was also a candidate for the governor of Barinas state for the Democratic Unity Roundtable in the 2017 election, which he lost to the pro-government candidate Argenis Chávez.

== Political career ==
On 23 February 2019, the same day as the Venezuelan opposition attempted to get humanitarian aid to Venezuela through the Colombia–Venezuela border, Freddy Superlano and his assistant were poisoned in Cúcuta, Colombia. His assistant and cousin, Carlos Salinas, subsequently died. The opposition asked for an investigation, without making "claims on who the culprits were". United States senator Marco Rubio called the poisoning a "grave situation". Maduro-aligned state media claimed Superlano and his assistant were poisoned by prostitutes.

In May 2019, the Venezuela Supreme Tribunal of Justice ordered the prosecution of several National Assembly members, including Superlano, for their actions during the uprising attempt.

== Detention ==
Following the 28 July 2024 Venezuelan presidential election, Superlano was detained by masked men. A video of his detention was published by Brazilian outlet Poder360. Shortly before their detention, Diosdado Cabello had announced that the arrest of ten opposition leaders was planned. Cabello confirmed Superlano's arrest 30 hours later but did not reveal the reason for his detention – along with his assistant and driver – or their whereabouts. A week later, attorney Joel García confirmed that Superlano and journalist Roland Carreño were both held in El Helicoide on unknown charges, calling their arrests "kidnapping with a judicial appearance". Representatives of Superlano's party said they were told by chavista informants that the intent was to torture Superlano and "make him confess to the false plan set up by regime spokesmen such as Tarek William Saab".

== See also ==
- Venezuela Aid Live
