= Laidy Gómez =

Venezuelan politician (born 1981)

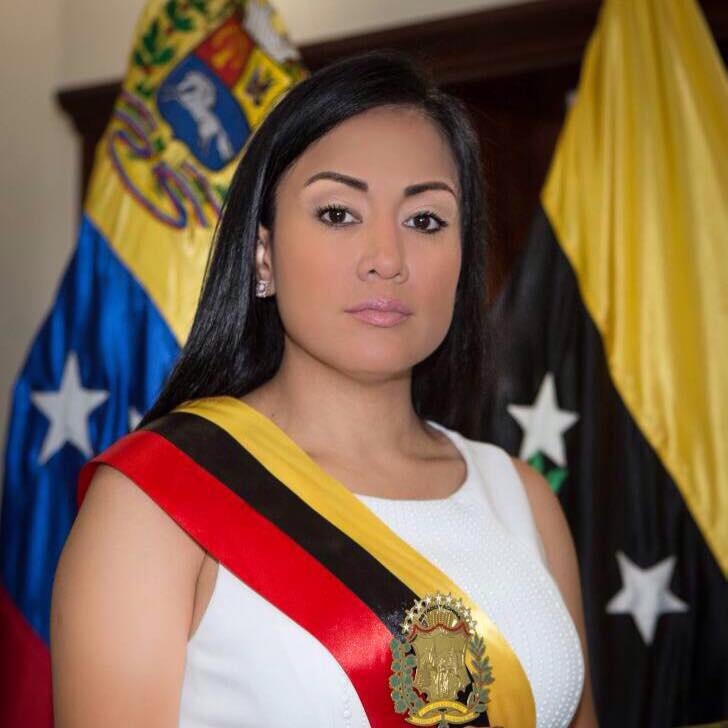

Governor of Táchira
- In office 23 October 2017 – 4 December 2021
- Preceded by: José Vielma Mora
- Succeeded by: Freddy Bernal

Member of the National Assembly of Venezuela
- In office 5 January 2016 – 23 October 2017
- Constituency: Táchira

Personal details
- Born: 12 December 1981 (age 44) Rubio, Táchira, Venezuela
- Party: Democratic Action
- Profession: Politician, lawyer

Laidy Yorveys Gómez Flórez (born 12 December 1981) is a Venezuelan politician, a member of Democratic Action and a former governor of Táchira.

Gómez was born in Rubio, Junín Municipality, Táchira, Venezuela, and became the governor of Táchira in 2017.

== See also ==
- Luisa Teresa Pacheco
