= Freddy Bernal =

Venezuelan politician

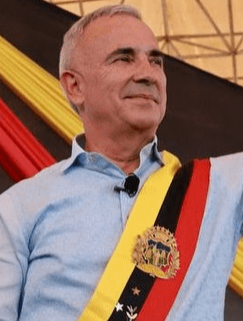
- Bernal in 2025

Governor of Táchira
- Incumbent
- Assumed office 4 December 2021
- Preceded by: Laidy Gómez

Minister for Urban Agriculture
- In office 30 July 2017 – 14 June 2018
- President: Nicolás Maduro
- Preceded by: Erika Farías
- Succeeded by: Mayerlin Arias

Deputy of the National Assembly of Venezuela
- In office 5 January 2011 – 5 January 2016
- Constituency: Capital District

Mayor of Libertador Municipality
- In office 30 July 2000 – 30 November 2008
- Preceded by: Antonio Ledezma
- Succeeded by: Jorge Rodríguez

Member of Constituent National Assembly of Venezuela
- In office 3 August 1999 – 31 January 2000

Member of the Chamber of Deputies
- In office 23 January 1999 – 22 December 1999

Personal details
- Born: Freddy Alirio Bernal Rosales; 16 June 1962 (age 64) San Cristóbal, Táchira, Venezuela
- Party: United Socialist Party of Venezuela (PSUV) (from 2007); Fifth Republic Movement (until 2007)

Freddy Alirio Bernal Rosales is a Venezuelan politician. He served as mayor of the Libertador Municipality in Caracas and is a member of the United Socialist Party of Venezuela (PSUV).

== Law enforcement ==
Prior to becoming a politician, the BBC says he "commanded a notorious metropolitan police elite corps known as the Z Group". In October 2014, President Nicolás Maduro made Bernal head of a newly created presidential commission concentrated on police reform. President Maduro stated that the goal of the commission led by Bernal was to review both CICPC and the Bolivarian National Police.

== Political career ==
The BBC described Bernal as President Hugo Chávez's "most trusted mayor in Caracas", adding that the "opposition regard him as ultra-revolutionary". Bernal was also a leader of the Bolivarian Circles.

== Controversy ==
In an 18 March 2015 interview with Globovisión, Bernal was asked "Can a homosexual be a police officer?" to where he replied, "Yes ... so long as they don’t manifest their sexual preference publicly. Because imagine if a police officer that might want to wear a pink shirt, or wear lipstick. I think that that, at least in Venezuela, I don’t know in other places, doesn’t go with our culture." He then attempted to clarify, stating "I have nothing against sexual diversity ... But they couldn’t manifest it publicly, because it goes against the structure of what a police officer should be." Bernal's remarks raised concerns of homophobia in Venezuela among the Venezuelan and the international LGBT communities.

== Sanctions ==
Bernal has been sanctioned by several countries.

=== Canada ===
Canada sanctioned 40 Venezuelan officials, including Bernal, in September 2017. The sanctions were for behaviors that undermined democracy after at least 125 people will killed in the 2017 Venezuelan protests and "in response to the government of Venezuela's deepening descent into dictatorship". Canadians were banned from transactions with the 40 individuals, whose Canadian assets were frozen. The sanctions noted a rupture of Venezuela's constitutional order.

=== United States ===
In 2011, four Hugo Chávez allies were sanctioned by the United States Department of the Treasury for allegedly helping FARC obtain weapons and smuggle drugs. Bernal, one of the sanctioned, dismissed the charges as "an aggression", saying he would not be frightened by the sanctions.

In November 2017, Bernal was again sanctioned by the United States Office of Foreign Assets Control after the 2017 Venezuelan Constituent Assembly election; the Treasury Department described the individuals sanctioned as being "associated with undermining electoral processes, media censorship, or corruption in government-administered food programs in Venezuela".

=== Panama ===
In March 2018, Panama sanctioned 55 public officials, including Bernal; the officials were sanctioned by the Panamanian government for their alleged involvement with "money laundering, financing of terrorism and financing the proliferation of weapons of mass destruction".

=== European Union ===
On 25 June 2018, the European Union sanctioned eleven Venezuelan officials, including Bernal, in response to the May 2018 Venezuelan presidential election, which the E.U. described as "neither free nor fair".

=== Switzerland ===
On 10 July 2018, he was among 11 Venezuelans previously sanctioned by the European Union in June 2018 added to the sanctions list of Switzerland.

== See also ==
- State protector

Preceded by Antonio Ledezma	Mayor of Libertador Municipality; 2000–2008	Succeeded by Jorge Rodríguez
