= Rodolfo Marco Torres =

Venezuelan military officer and politician

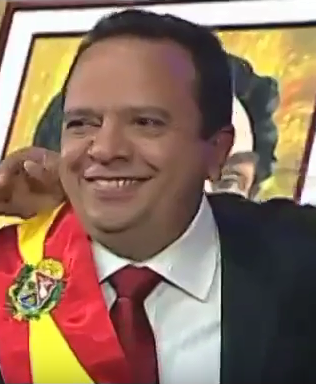

Governor of Aragua State
- In office 15 October 2017 – 27 August 2021
- Preceded by: Caryl Bertho
- Succeeded by: Daniela González

Personal details
- Born: Rodolfo Clemente Marco Torres; 10 September 1966 (age 59) Aragua, Venezuela
- Party: United Socialist Party of Venezuela (PSUV)
- Occupation: Politician, military officer

Rodolfo Clemente Marco Torres (born 10 September 1966), is a Venezuelan military officer and politician. He was the governor of Aragua State in 2017–2021.

He was Minister of State for Public Banking, Minister of Food and Director of the Bank of Venezuela, as well as being president of the Bicentennial Bank and the Treasury Bank. Similarly, President Nicolas Maduro announced on 15 January 2014 as Minister of Finance, a position that was dismissed by the National Assembly on 28 April 2016. Decision revoked by the Constitutional Chamber of the Supreme Court of Justice on 19 August 2016. On 13 August 2017, he was announced his candidacy for the Governorate of Aragua state, which he won.

== Biography ==
He graduated from the Military Academy in 1988. He participated in the coup attempt, led by Hugo Chávez, on 4 February 1992 against President Carlos Andrés Pérez. Following the election of Chávez as President, he has held various positions in Venezuelan government institutions.

On 22 August 2005, he was named president of the Banco del Tesoro by President Hugo Chávez. Then he became the National Treasurer in 2011.

By January 2014, he was appointed Minister of the Popular Power of Economy, Finance and Public Banking, when he merged with the Ministry of State for Public Banking.

By April 2016, the National Assembly, with more than 3/5 of those present, approved their removal from the position of Economy, Finance and Public Banking.

Rodolfo Clemente Marco Torres became the governor of Aragua following the regional election. In August 2021, he resigned from the Aragua Governorship.

== Corruption ==
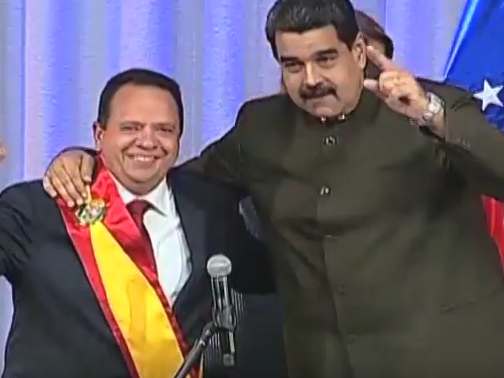
With President Nicolás Maduro

Marco has been sanctioned by Canada, the United States, and Panama. On 5 January 2018 the US Department of State issued sanctions against Rodoldo Clemente and 3 other officials of the Venezuelan government for their links with corruption networks. The State Department assures that these "high-ranking military officers and officials benefit from corruption under the Maduro regime as citizens, the economy and democratic institutions languish."

== Decorations ==
- Military Order General in Chief Eleazar López Contreras.
