= List of governors of Táchira =

Flag of Táchira

This is a list of governors of the Venezuelan Táchira State:

Until 1989, they were appointed by the president of Venezuela. Starting from that year they are elected in universal, direct and secret elections.

== Elected governors ==
Took office	Left office	Governor	Vote
1989	1992	José Francisco Ron Sandoval, Democratic Action	45.31
1992	1995	José Francisco Ron Sandoval, Democratic Action	45.31
1995	1998	Ricardo Méndez Moreno, Democratic Action	37.27
1998	2000	Sergio Omar Calderón, COPEI	47.72
2000	2004	Ronald Blanco La Cruz, MVR	50.03
2004	2008	Ronald Blanco La Cruz, MVR	57.48
2008	2012	César Pérez Vivas, COPEI	49.46
2012	2017	José Vielma Mora, PSUV	54.00
2017	2021	Laidy Gómez, Democratic Action	63,26
2021	2025	Freddy Bernal, PSUV	41,10
2025	2029	Freddy Bernal, GPPSB	80,01

== See also ==
- List of Venezuela governors
- Politics of Venezuela
- History of Venezuela
- Luisa Teresa Pacheco
