= Luisa Teresa Pacheco =

Venezuelan politician

Governor of Táchira state
- In office 1984–1989

Personal details
- Born: Luisa Teresa Pacheco de Chacón
- Died: 10 August 2023 San Cristóbal, Venezuela
- Party: Democratic Action
- Occupation: Politician

Luisa Teresa Pacheco de Chacón (died 10 August 2023) was a Venezuelan politician. She was the first female governor of Táchira state, appointed by President Jaime Lusinchi. Among the events that took place during her administration was the formal inauguration of the Táchira Museum on 14 December 1984. Luisa Teresa has also worked as a teacher.

== See also ==
- Laidy Gómez
- List of governors of Táchira
