= Patricia Gutiérrez =

Venezuelan politician

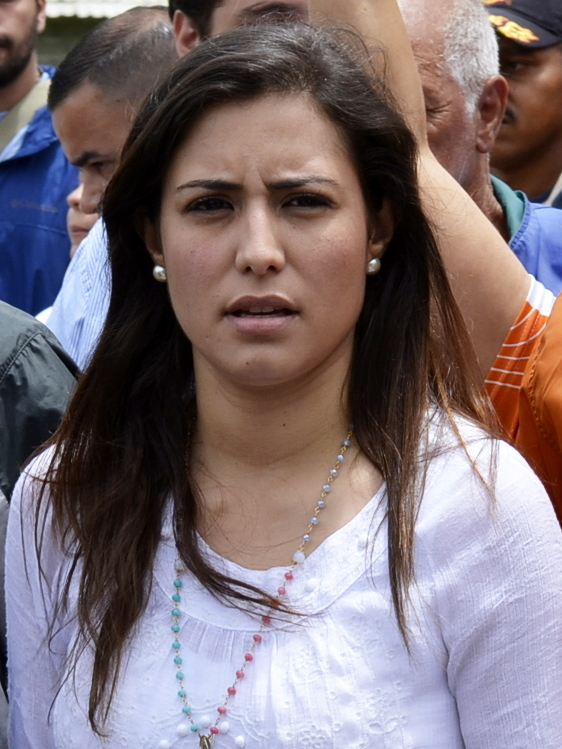

Mayor of San Cristóbal
- Incumbent
- Assumed office 26 May 2014
- Preceded by: Eduardo Delgado

First lady of San Cristóbal
- In office 12 December 2013 – 19 March 2014
- Preceded by: Mónica García Tezzi

Personal details
- Born: 15 October 1983 (age 41); Maracaibo, Venezuela
- Political party: Popular Will
- Spouse: Daniel Ceballos
- Children: María Victoria; María Verónica; Juan Daniel
- Parent(s): Armando Gutiérrez; Luivina Fernández
- Profession: Engineer

Patricia Lorena Gutiérrez Fernández (15 October 1983) is a Venezuelan politician and activist that currently is the mayor of San Cristóbal. She is married to Popular Will leader Daniel Ceballos.

== Biography ==
Gutiérrez was born in the Tierra Negra locality, being one among four children. She married Daniel Ceballos on 12 October 2007. She studied primary in the La Epifanía school in Zulia and later moves with her family to Táchira, obtaining her elementary diploma in the Cervantes school. She graduated as an industrial engineer from the Experimental University of Táchira.

Patricia started her political career being a member of the Justicia Universitaria movement, a student organization of Justice First. She has led several manifestations in Venezuela, giving a closure speech of a women's march that took place in San Cristóbal on 26 February 2014, organized nationwide by María Corina Machado and Lilian Tintori.

After her husband had his position as mayor of San Cristóbal revoked by the Supreme Tribunal of Justice due to the events that took place during the 2014 Venezuelan protests, she decides postulate herself as Mayoress of the municipality. She was elected with 73.2% of the votes.
