= Manuel Rosales =

Venezuelan educator and politician

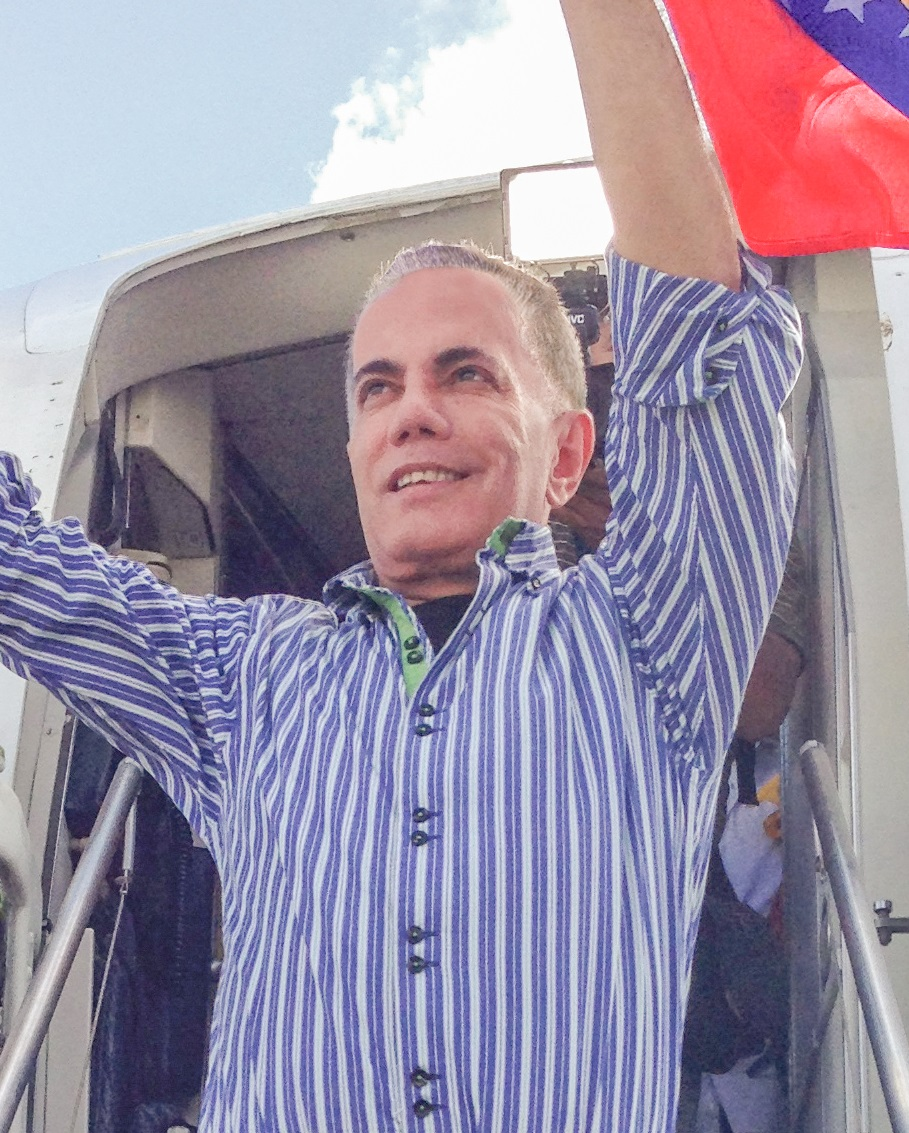

34th Governor of Zulia
- In office 10 December 2021 – 11 June 2025
- Preceded by: Omar Prieto
- Succeeded by: Luis Caldera
- In office 2 February 2000 – 23 November 2008
- Preceded by: Germán Valero
- Succeeded by: Pablo Pérez Álvarez

55th Mayor of Maracaibo
- In office 1 December 2008 – 24 April 2009
- Preceded by: Gian Carlo Di Martino
- Succeeded by: Daniel Ponne (interim)

53rd Mayor of Maracaibo
- In office 1996–2000
- Preceded by: Fernando Chumaceiro
- Succeeded by: Gian Carlo Di Martino

Personal details
- Born: 12 December 1952 (age 73) Santa Bárbara del Zulia, Zulia State, Venezuela
- Party: Un Nuevo Tiempo
- Spouse: Eveling Trejo de Rosales
- Profession: Politician/Teacher

Manuel Antonio Rosales Guerrero (born 12 December 1952, in Santa Bárbara del Zulia) is a Venezuelan educator and politician and former governor of Zulia. He was the most prominent Venezuelan opposition candidate in the 2006 presidential election, losing to incumbent Hugo Chávez. He served as a congressman, mayor, and governor, but in April 2009, stepped down as Mayor of Maracaibo when he was charged with corruption in Venezuela and fled to Peru. Rosales denies the charges, and was granted political asylum in Peru. He was briefly the presidential candidate for Un Nuevo Tiempo in the 2024 Venezuelan presidential election, but he ended up suspending his candidacy.

== Early political career ==
Rosales began his political career as a youth leader of the political party, Acción Democrática (AD), described by the BBC as "one of the two parties that dominated Venezuelan politics for most of the second half of the 20th Century". In 2000 he founded "his own centre-left party which he called Un Nuevo Tiempo" (A New Era); he describes "himself as a social democrat".

Rosales served as a congressman in the Zulia Legislative Assembly (1983–1994), Mayor of Maracaibo (1996–2000)—Venezuela's second-largest city, in Zulia, Venezuela's wealthiest state—and Governor of Zulia for two terms (2000–2004 and 2004–2008).

Rosales was accused of participating in the 2002 "attempt to oust the president"; according to the BBC, "government supporters accuse him of taking part in a short-lived coup ...". Rosales signed the Carmona Decree—a document drawn up on the day following the Venezuelan coup attempt of 2002, which saw the temporary removal of President Chávez. He declared that he signed during a "moment of confusion" after "Chavez's resignation, although [Chavez] later denied [the resignation]", and that he signed his attendance at a meeting he was urgently requested to attend.

== 2006 presidential bid ==
Rosales was defeated by Chavez in the December 2006 Venezuelan election to choose a president for the six-year term beginning in January 2007. A primary election organized by Sumate had been scheduled for August 2006, but was cancelled when other presidential opposition candidates agreed to withdraw from the race and support Rosales. As "one of only two governors" opposed to Chavez, Rosales united the opposition, representing a broad coalition of parties and organizations opposed to Hugo Chávez. According to the BBC, "critics ... describe him as uncharismatic".

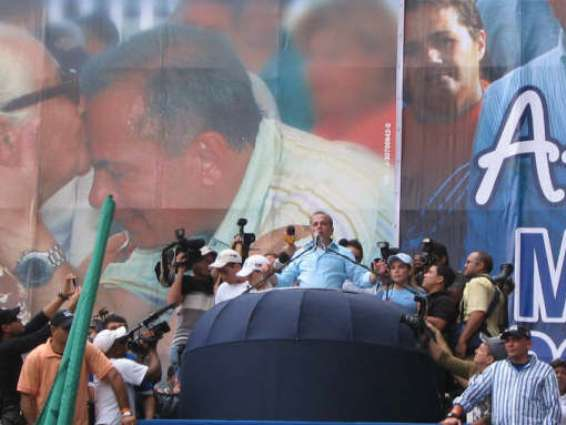
Rosales during electoral campaign, August 2006

Rosales' platform was based on what he called "democracy and social justice" and crime; according to the BBC, "He has accused Mr Chavez of wasting the country's oil wealth on friendly governments abroad and of trying to introduce Cuban-style communism." Rosales said that the backbone of his government program would be the social arena, saying it would be a "sound and well defined" program, including a "fair allocation of oil revenues by means of two axes – minimum wage for all unemployed and direct contribution to the underprivileged". He stated that Chávez was vulnerable on his "massive foreign aid programs, government-approved takeovers of land and buildings, and the perception that crime is increasing". Rosales said, "We will distribute land to the peasants, but we will buy it in such a way as to respect the principle of private property, just as we will respect those of human rights and social justice." His platform would halt oil giveaways, "including sales of discounted oil to Cuba, until Venezuela reduced its high poverty rate."

Rosales accused Chávez of "overspending on a military buildup" and pledged "to use Venezuela's oil wealth to help the poor and improve education and health care", ridiculing Chávez's "claims of a possible war with the U.S." and saying, "Venezuela's real war should be against rampant street crime." The New York Times said, "Rosales has focused on other themes, including fierce criticism of the alliances Mr. Chávez has made with countries on the fringes of American influence, like Iran and Cuba. But his campaign's predominant message is that Mr. Chávez, despite his socialist talk, has failed to deliver oil wealth to the poor." The New York Times also said Rosales "has been pounding the crime issue, questioning why murders have surged since Mr. Chávez entered office", and saying Chavez's "confrontational style" was "feeding the crime epidemic".

Incumbent president Hugo Chávez was re-elected with 62.87% of the vote.

== Indictments ==
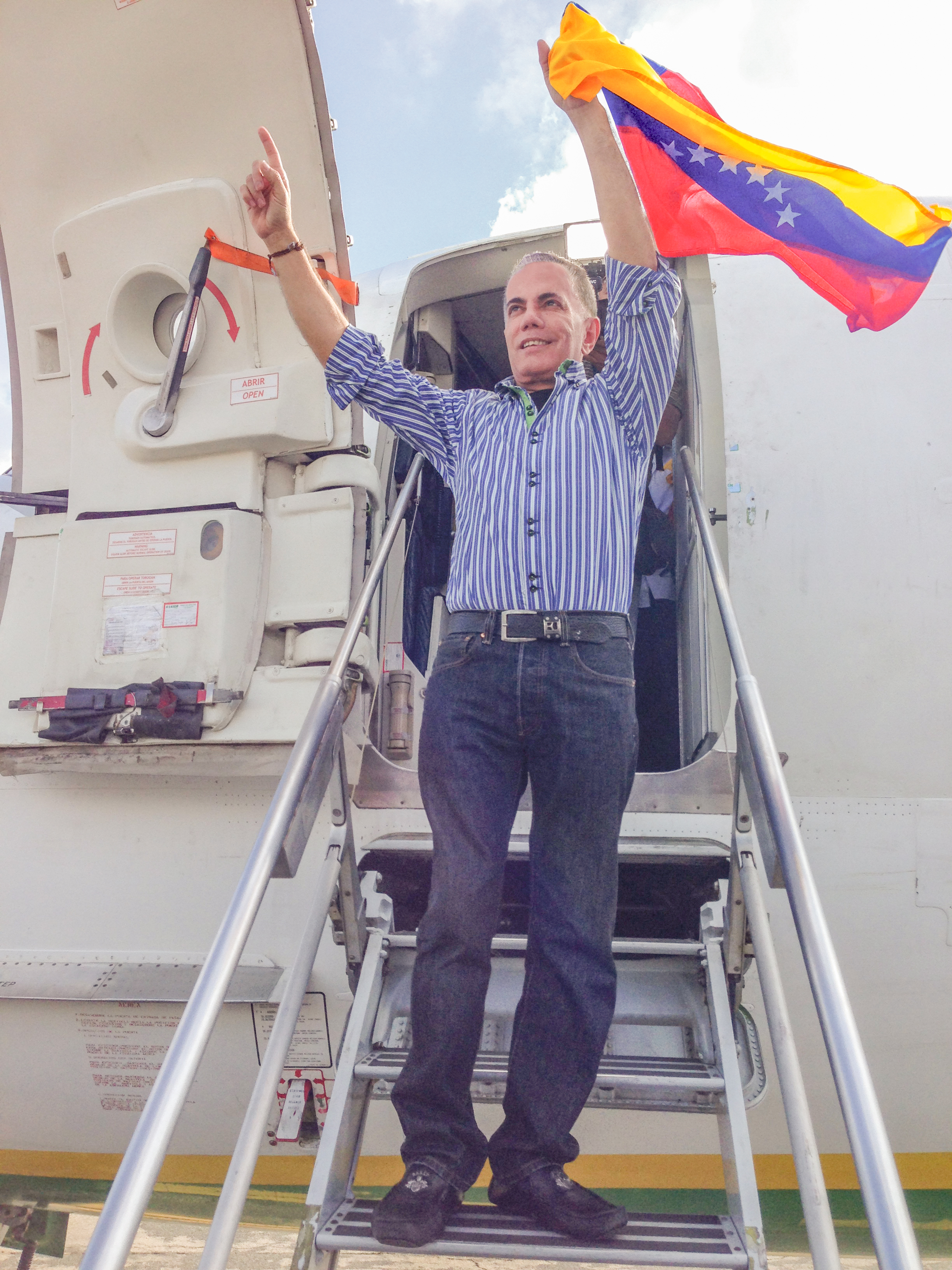
Manuel Rosales arrives to Venezuela on 15 October 2015

Rosales was re-elected Mayor of Maracaibo in the 2008 Venezuelan regional elections; according to the BBC, in "the campaign, Mr Chavez railed against him, threatening him with prison and accusing him of corruption and plotting to assassinate him". According to USA Today, Rosales characterized the allegations as an "electoral ploy to distract Venezuelans from pressing problems such as double-digit inflation and rampant crime".

Rosales was charged by the Venezuelan Attorney General with corruption in late 2008, accused of "misusing public funds" during his term as Governor of Zulia—charges which he denies. Prosecutors say he obtained $60,000 illicitly while he was governor. According to Rosales, a 2002–2004 investigation that "was closed for lack of evidence" was "'suddenly reopened by orders from above,' alluding to Chavez".

Rosales went into hiding in March 2009 when charges were filed, and failed to appear in court in April. On 22 April it was reported that he had sought political asylum in Peru. Interpol issued a "red notice" (requesting international cooperation in the apprehension of a suspect, with a view to enabling extradition proceedings) at Venezuela's request.

According to CNN, "[o]ne of Rosales' lawyers noted that Chavez said publicly in October 2008, before Rosales was charged, that he wanted the mayor in prison." Rosales' supporters characterized the charges as a "political witch hunt". According to the BBC, "His decision to leave Venezuela is the latest development in a long-running feud with Mr Chavez." Venezuelan authorities deny that the charges are politically motivated.

On 28 April 2009, Venezuela withdrew its ambassador to Lima in response to Peru's decision to grant Rosales political asylum. Peruvian officials said the decision was part of their "long-standing commitment to international law"; Venezuelan officials called it a "mockery of international law, a strong blow to the fight against corruption and an offence to the people of Venezuela", saying that Rosales should have been detained and extradited.

The newspaper El Nuevo Herald reported in 2009 about allegations by Geovanny Velásquez Zambrano, a member of the Colombian paramilitary group Autodefensas Unidas de Colombia serving a 40-year prison term for paramilitary massacres, that Rosales met with Colombian paramilitaries in 1999 to plot the assassination of Chávez. Zambrano claims that he attended two meetings with Rosales, in which Rosales offered him and his subordinates US$25 million to kill Chávez. Rosales denies these allegations, saying they are a lie and that his passport documents that he was in Aruba during the time of the alleged meetings, saying "The only plan in which I have been involved to 'do away with' Chavez has been the electoral plan". Venezuela's Attorney General announced an investigation of these allegations in October 2009.

The 2009 Human Rights Watch report mentions Rosales as an example of political persecution, questioning the judicial procedures against him.

In October 2015, Rosales announced that he would be returning to Venezuela. Attorney General Luisa Ortega Diaz reported that a warrant had been issued for Rosales' arrest, upon his arriving in the country.

On 15 October 2015, Rosales was arrested in Maracaibo after arriving from Aruba and was sentenced to 13 years and 9 months in prison soon after.

In October 2016, Rosales' sentence was commuted to house arrest and he was released 2 months later on 31 December.

== 2024 presidential bid ==
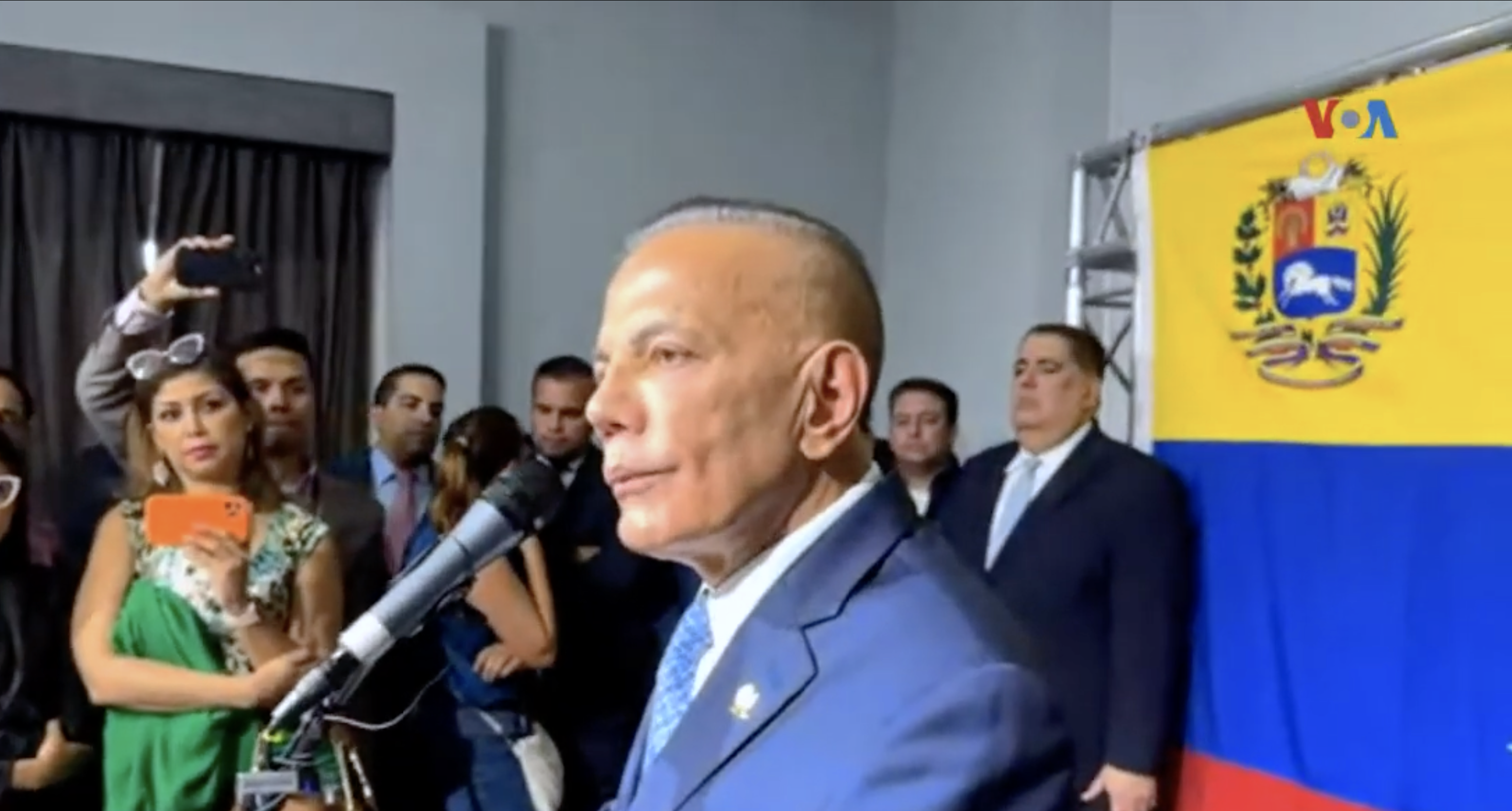
Rosales announcing his candidacy in the 2024 presidential election

Rosales launched a surprise bid for president in 2024, though he indicated he would willingly cede his position to a unity opposition candidate. He has been recognized as a more moderate opposition candidate and has been negotiable with the Nicolás Maduro government; he recognized Maduro's contested 2018 election and condemned sanctions on Venezuela enacted by the United States. Professor David Smilde of Tulane University said that the Maduro government believes that if Rosales were to win the election, he would be more amicable, with Smilde stating "They see him with good reason as more moderate and less vendetta-driven." Corina Yoris, who was María Corina Machado's alternative candidate for the 2024 election, criticized Rosales' candidacy as "a betrayal" and argued that elections did not exist "if the regime chooses the candidates."

On 20 April, Rosales suspended his candidacy and endorsed Edmundo González Urrutia.

== Personal life ==
Rosales was a teacher before moving into public service. He was a co-founder of Universidad Nacional Experimental Sur del Lago, and received numerous distinctions and honors for his public service.

He is married to Eveling Trejo de Rosales; they have ten children (Hender Manuel, Jenny, Manuel Alejandro, Marenel, Marebeth, Carlos Manuel, Manuel Andrés, Alejandra, and Aleida).

== See also ==
- List of people granted political asylum
- Political prisoners in Venezuela

Political offices
Preceded by Gian Carlo Di Martino	Mayor of Maracaibo; 2008–2009	Succeeded by Daniel Ponne
Preceded by Germán Valero	Governor of Zulia; 2000-2008	Succeeded by Pablo Pérez Álvarez
Preceded by Fernando Chumaceiro	Mayor of Maracaibo; 1996–2000	Succeeded by Gian Carlo Di Martino
Party political offices
Preceded by None	Un Nuevo Tiempo Presidential nominee 2006 (lost)	Succeeded by Most recent
