= José Vielma Mora =

Venezuelan politician (born 1964)

José Gregorio Vielma Mora
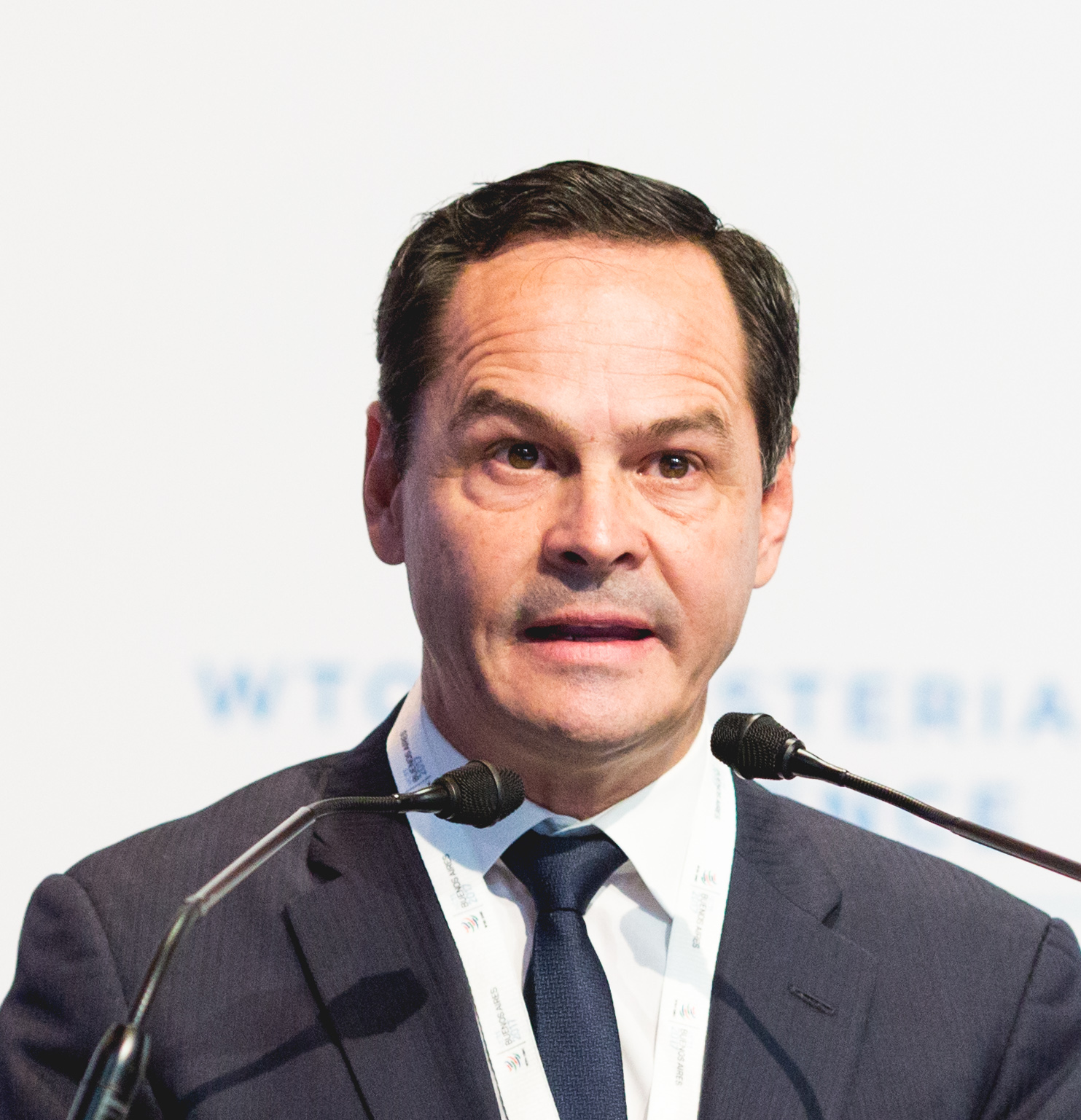
- José Vielma Mora in December 2017

Deputy of the National Assembly of Venezuela
- Incumbent
- Assumed office 5 January 2021
- Constituency: Carabobo

Minister of Foreign Trade and International Investment of Venezuela
- In office 26 November 2017 – 14 June 2018
- President: Nicolás Maduro
- Preceded by: Miguel Pérez Abad
- Succeeded by: Yomana Koteich

46th Governor of Táchira
- In office 10 January 2013 – 23 October 2017
- Preceded by: César Pérez Vivas
- Succeeded by: Laidy Gómez

Director of National Integrated Service for the Administration of Customs Duties and Taxes
- In office 10 August 2000 – 23 January 2008
- President: Hugo Chávez
- Succeeded by: José David Cabello

Member of the Constituent National Assembly of Venezuela
- In office 3 August 1999 – 31 January 2000

Personal details
- Born: October 26, 1964 (age 61) San Cristóbal, Táchira State
- Party: United Socialist Party of Venezuela (PSUV)

José Gregorio Vielma Mora (born 26 October 1964, San Cristóbal, Táchira) was the former governor of the Venezuelan state of Táchira (2012-2017). He is a member of the United Socialist Party of Venezuela.

== Election results ==
Governor
Candidate	Party	Votes	%
José Vielma Mora	United Socialist Party of Venezuela	248.788	54,00
César Pérez Vivas	COPEI	209.568	45,49
William Méndez	National Opinion	1.700	0,36
Manuel Rugeles	PORESTA	321	0,06
Rafael Escobar	NUVIPA	302	0,06
Invalid/blank votes		15.380	–
Total		476.074	100
Registered voters/turnout		826.821	57,57
Source: CNE

== Sanctions ==
The Government of Canada sanctioned Vielma Mora in November 2017 as being someone who participated in "significant acts of corruption or who have been involved in serious violations of human rights".

The United States sanctioned Vielma Mora on 25 July 2019 for being involved in a corrupted food scheme with Colombian businessman Alex Saab. Saab used some of his profits from corrupt food contracts to pay bribes to government officials for the importation of food through Táchira, including to Vielma Mora, who was the governor at the time.
