= David Smolansky =

Venezuelan politician (born 1985)

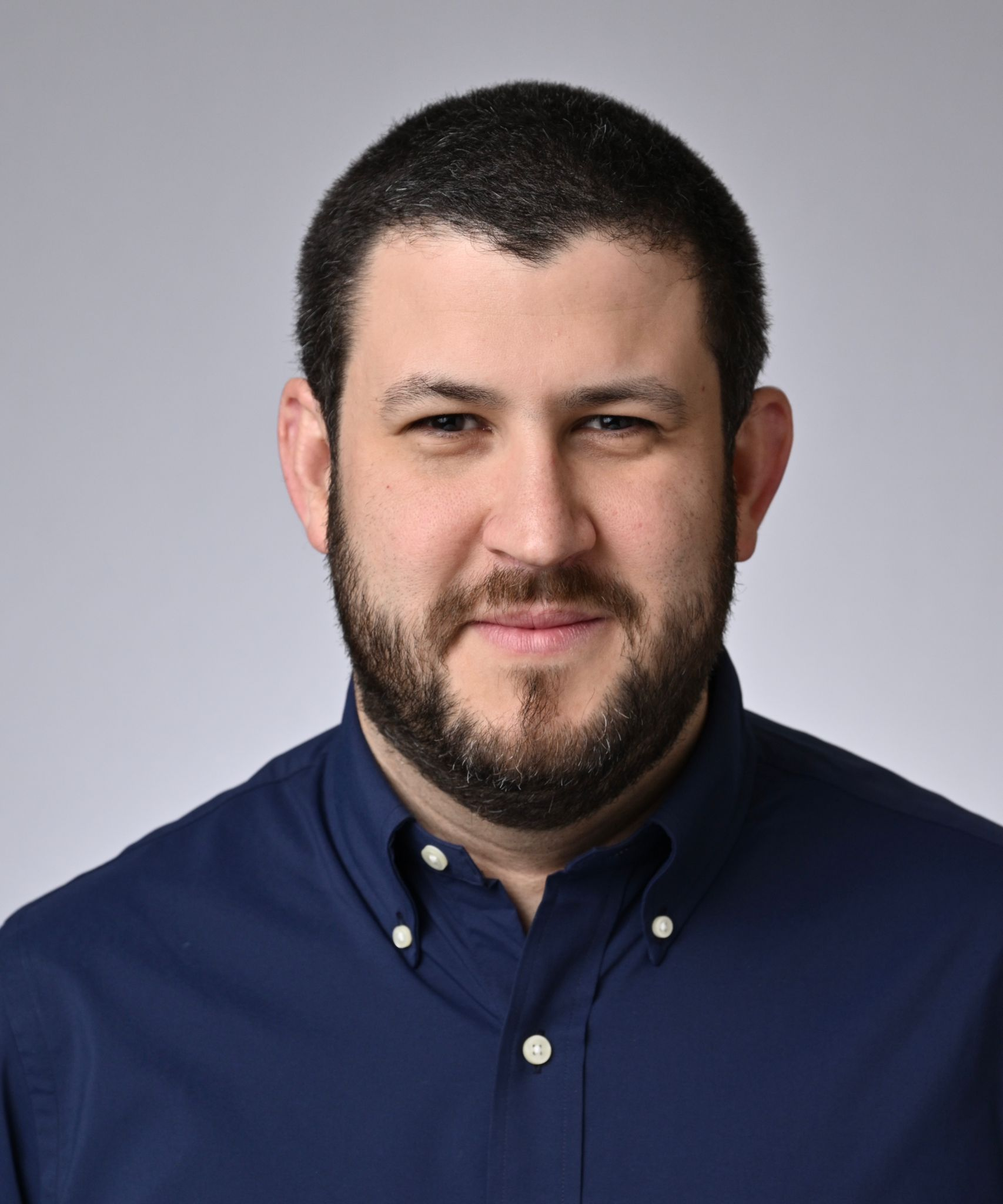
- Smolansky in 2024

Special Envoy of the Organization of American States
- In office 8 September 2018 – 15 June 2023

Mayor of El Hatillo Municipality
- In office 8 December 2013 – 9 August 2017
- Preceded by: Myriam Do Nascimento
- Succeeded by: Reinaldo Díaz

Personal details
- Born: David Smolansky Urosa; 27 May 1985 (age 41) Caracas, Venezuela
- Party: Independent (since 2023)
- Other political affiliations: Popular Will (2009–2023)
- Education: Andrés Bello Catholic University; Johns Hopkins University; Simón Bolívar University (MSc)

David Smolansky Urosa (born 27 May 1985) is a Venezuelan politician and journalist. He serves as an advisor on Foreign Affairs and Citizen Security to María Corina Machado, the 2025 Nobel Peace Prize laureate, and to former presidential candidate Edmundo González Urrutia. He has held this role since July 16, 2023.

Smolansky began his public career as a leader of the 2007 Venezuelan student movement and was subsequently elected mayor of the El Hatillo Municipality for the 2013-2017 term.

In 2017, he was illegally removed from his office, sentenced to prison, and arbitrarily banned from holding public positions by the Supreme Tribunal of Justice (TSJ), which led to his exile. Following his politically motivated exile and persecution, he served as the Organization of American States (OAS) special envoy for the Venezuelan migrant and refugee crisis between 2018 and 2023.

Smolansky resides in Washington, D.C. where he founded and presided over the Miranda Center for Democracy. He also serves as a senior fellow at Victims of Communism Memorial Foundation and the Renew Democracy Initiative (RDI).

== Early life ==
David Smolansky Urosa was born in Caracas on May 27, 1985, the son of a Jewish father and a Catholic mother, raised in a multicultural and multi-religious family background.

His paternal grandparents emigrated from Ukraine (then part of the Soviet Union) to Havana, Cuba, in the late 1920s. Subsequently, in 1970, his father settled in Venezuela. As he has stated, his family's history of exile influenced his interest in politics and public service.

=== Academic background ===
Smolansky holds a bachelor's degree in mass communication with a specialization in journalism from the Andres Bello Catholic University, and a master's degree in international public policy from the Johns Hopkins University School of Advanced International Studies (SAIS).

He also served as a visiting fellow of the Competitiveness Leadership Program at Georgetown University, completed the Draper Hills Summer Fellows Program at Stanford University Center on Democracy, Development, and the Rule of Law (CDDRL), and was dissident in residence fellow at SNF Agora Institute de Johns Hopkins

He has lectured and given conferences on the Venezuelan crisis at universities, including Johns Hopkins, Yale, Cornell, Florida International University, and Fordham University. In addition, he has participated in forums about Venezuela at think tanks, including Center for Strategic and International Studies (CSIS), the Hudson Institute and the America First Policy Institute.

== Political career ==
=== Student movement ===
Smolansky began his public trajectory in the late 2000s as a university leader who became a founding member of the Venezuelan Student Movement. He led protests against the closure of the RCTV television network and opposed the 2007 constitutional reform. The referendum was rejected, giving Hugo Chávez's only electoral defeat during his presidency. In 2009, Smolansky led the Student Movement in opposing a new referendum called by Chávez to enable the indefinite re-election of popularly elected officials.

=== Voluntad Popular ===
He was a founding member of Voluntad Popular, a political party established in 2009, where he assumed responsibilities in the youth branch. He participated in the party's open primary elections and was chosen for its national leadership with the second-highest vote count. He resigned from Voluntad Popular in 2023 due to disagreements with the organization. Since then, he has remained independent.

=== Mayor of El Hatillo ===
In 2013, he was elected mayor of the El Hatillo Municipality, becoming Venezuela's youngest local leader at the age of 28. His administration took place against the backdrop of the national socioeconomic crisis that began in those years. According to measurements by the organization Transparency Venezuela, during his tenure, l Hatillo ranked among the four municipalities with the best transparency evaluation in the country, out of a total of 335. In the area of citizen security, press reports indicated that his administration reduced kidnapping rates in the municipality by 82% and expelled nearly a third of the local police force due to corruption cases.

In infrastructure, he inaugurated the first municipal public transport service, named TransHatillo, which connected the city with the surrounding rural areas. Amidst the national crisis, his administration implemented social programs that included a school feeding plan aimed at mitigating child malnutrition and a home medical care service. The mayor's office reported having consolidated more than 200 alliances with the private sector, non-governmental organizations, and universities.

== Persecution and exile ==
In the context of the 2017 protests in Venezuela, the Constitutional Chamber of the TSJ issued rulings against several opposition mayors. On August 9, 2017, it issued an arrest warrant against him, illegally removed him from the office of mayor, sentenced him to 15 months in prison, and imposed a political ban that included the suspension of his right to vote. Various human rights organizations described these measures as arbitrary and violative of his civil and political rights.

After remaining in clandestinity for over a month, he left the country through Brazil dressed as a priest to avoid being identified and subsequently went into exile in the United States. In August 2019, the General Controllership of the Republic of Venezuela issued a new measure barring him from holding public office for 15 years.

During his exile, he has reported being the target of smear campaigns, including anti-Semitic hate speech on digital platforms and threats broadcast by state media. The United States Department of State's International Religious Freedom Report documented attacks motivated by his religious background.

=== OAS Special Envoy ===
In September 2018, the Secretary of the Organization of American States, Luis Almagro, appointed him as special envoy to address the Venezuelan migration crisis.

Smolansky assumed the position at a time when the displacement of Venezuelans has been estimated between 8 and 9 million people, categorized by his office and international agencies as the largest in the world.

During his tenure, he promoted regional protection frameworks and coordinated policy responses among OAS member states. He conducted over 20 official visits to 11 countries in the hemisphere and published 15 technical reports.

These documents, prepared with local governments, civil society, and international institutions, attributed the massive displacement of Venezuelans to the national humanitarian emergency, as well as the country’s political instability, collapse of basic services, and economic crisis.

Although his office did not provide direct humanitarian assistance, he advocated for the integration of the diaspora. During that period, countries such as Colombia, Peru, and Brazil adopted temporary protection mechanisms, expanded access to health services for migrants, and recognized expired Venezuelan passports to facilitate legal status and mobility.

=== María Corina Machado's International Team ===
In 2023, he joined the international team of opposition leader María Corina Machado to coordinate the diaspora's participation in the Unitary Platform's primary elections and, subsequently, in the 2024 presidential elections.

Based on voting records compiled by more than 600,000 volunteers, Edmundo González Urrutia won the election, a result supported by independent media analyses and by government such as the United States and the European Union, while Venezuelan authorities proclaimed Nicolás Maduro the winner.

As Senior Foreign Affairs Advisor to Machado and González Urrutia, he spearheads bipartisan U.S. government relations and coordinates the diplomatic agenda. His scope of work includes seeking accountability and justice for members of the venezuelan regime.

=== Miranda Center for Democracy ===
He is the founder and president of the Miranda Center for Democracy, a non-partisan think tank based in Washington, D.C., focused on liberty, security, democracy, and transparency in Latin America and the Caribbean.

Miranda Center for Democracy has published a series of research reports focused on regional politics and security. Notable documents include analyses on military economic capture (GAESA, the Cuban military's business conglomerate), the country's geopolitical alliances, Venezuela's shipment of oil to Cuba for 25 years in exchange for the installation of a repressive apparatus, and the implementation of state surveillance technology. Likewise, the institution issued a preliminary technical assessment on the management and response capacity of Delcy Rodríguez's administration regarding the earthquakes that struck Venezuela in June 2026.

== Awards and recognition ==
- Heinz Sonntag Youth Award (2015): Granted by the Hannah Arendt Observatory.
- Ten Outstanding Young Persons of the World (2015): Recognized as an outstanding young politician by Junior Chamber International (JCI) in Kanazawa, Japan.
- GCL Impact Award (2018): Conferred by the Latin American Leadership Program of Georgetown University.
