= Fernando Chumaceiro =

Venezuelan politician (1931–2026)

Member of the Venezuelan Chamber of Deputies
- In office 11 March 1969 – 26 February 1970

Personal details
- Born: Fernando Chumaceiro Chiarelli; 12 July 1931 Maracaibo, Venezuela
- Died: 7 July 2026 (aged 94)
- Party: Copei
- Occupation: Lawyer

Fernando Chumaceiro Chiarelli (12 July 1931 – 7 July 2026) was a Venezuelan politician. A member of Copei, he served in the Chamber of Deputies from 1969 to 1970.

Chumaceiro died on 7 July 2026, at the age of 94.
