= Gian Carlo di Martino =

Venezuelan politician and lawyer

Gian Carlo Di Martino
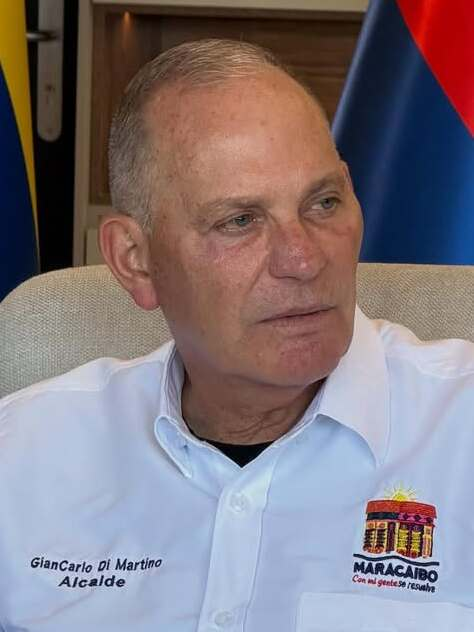
- Di Martino in 2026

3rd and 8th Mayor of Maracaibo
- Incumbent
- Assumed office 8 August 2025
- Preceded by: Adrián Romero Martínez (acting)
- In office 30 July 2000 – 1 December 2008
- Preceded by: Manuel Rosales
- Succeeded by: Manuel Rosales

Personal details
- Born: July 12, 1964 (age 61) Maracaibo, Zulia State, Venezuela
- Party: United Socialist Party of Venezuela
- Spouse: Ana Clara Barboza de Di Martino
- Profession: Politician, lawyer

Gian Carlo Di Martino Tarquinio (born 12 July 1964) is a Venezuelan politician and lawyer who has served as the 8th mayor of Maracaibo since 2026. He previously served as the 3rd mayor of Maracaibo from 2000 to 2008.

== Biography ==
Di Martino was born on July 12, 1964, in Maracaibo, the son of Italian immigrants. He received a bachelor's degree in political sciences at the Rafael Urdaneta University in 1987. In 1991, he received a diploma in international diplomacy from the Central University of Venezuela. In 1993, he graduated as a lawyer at the Andrés Bello Catholic University in Caracas.

In 1997, he was director of the Sabaneta jail in Maracaibo and general director of the foreign affairs office of Zulia. Two years later, he became alderman of the city.

In 2000, he was elected mayor of Maracaibo and was re-elected in 2004.

Di Martino became a member of the PSUV and ran for governor of Zulia in the regional elections on 23 November 2008. He was defeated by Pablo Pérez of A New Era.

== Personal life ==
Di Martino is married to Ana Clara Barboza, president of the Fundacion Niños del Sol. They have five children.

Preceded by Manuel Rosales	Mayor of Maracaibo; 2000–2008	Succeeded by Manuel Rosales
