= Pablo Pérez Álvarez =

Venezuelan politician (born 1969)

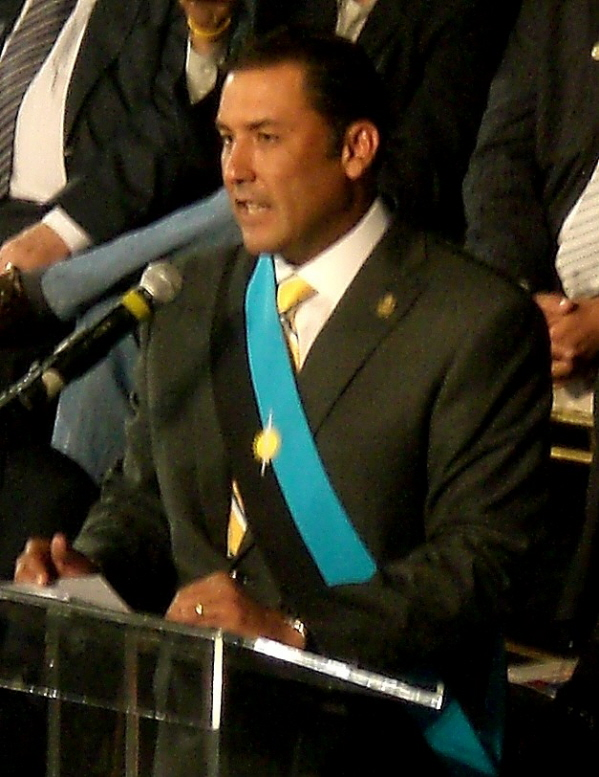

Deputy of the National Assembly of Venezuela
- Incumbent
- Assumed office 5 January 2026
- Constituency: National List

35th Governor of Zulia
- In office 1 December 2008 – 20 December 2012
- Preceded by: Manuel Rosales
- Succeeded by: Francisco Arias Cárdenas

Secretary General of the State Government of Zulia
- In office 6 December 2006 – 1 December 2008
- Governor: Manuel Rosales
- Preceded by: Nelson Carrasquero
- Succeeded by: Ángel Sánchez

Personal details
- Born: Pablo Martín Pérez Álvarez; August 19, 1969 (age 56) Maracaibo, Zulia State
- Party: Union and Change (Since 2025); Justice First (2019-2025); A New Era (1999-2019); Democratic Action (1986-1999)
- Spouse: Mercedes Peñaranda
- Profession: Lawyer, Politician

Pablo Martín Pérez Álvarez (born 19 August 1969) is a Venezuelan lawyer and politician who served as the 35th Governor of Zulia from 2008 to 2012.

== Biography ==
=== Studies ===
In 1986 he graduated from secondary school with a diploma in Humanities. Pérez Álvarez enrolled at University of Zulia to study law. Later he did postgraduate studies in Public Law at the same university. Pérez Álvarez also studied Gerencia Municipal (municipal management) at Instituto de Estudios Superiores de Administración (IESA), a Venezuelan higher education institute of management.

=== Political career ===
In 1995 he began to work with Manuel Rosales, the mayor of Maracaibo. Pablo Pérez was in charge of the Legal Consultancy of the City Council and was a member of some commissions.

From 2000 to 2008, Manuel Rosales was Governor of Zulia. Pablo Pérez worked with him in some posts. In 2006 Pérez Álvarez was appointed by Rosales as Secretario de Gobierno, the second highest ranking official in the government of Zulia.

In 2004 Pablo Pérez was candidate of the political party un Nuevo Tiempo for the mayor’s office of Maracaibo. But he was narrowly defeated by the candidate of the Fifth Republic Movement, Gian Carlo di Martino.

=== Governor of Zulia ===
In 2008 he competed for the post of Governor of Zulia with the support of Un Nuevo Tiempo and other political parties opposed to the government of Hugo Chávez during the 2008 regional elections. Pablo Pérez won with 53.59% of the votes.

Preceded by Manuel Rosales	Governor of Zulia; 2008-2012	Succeeded by Francisco Arias Cárdenas
