= César Pérez Vivas =

Venezuelan politician

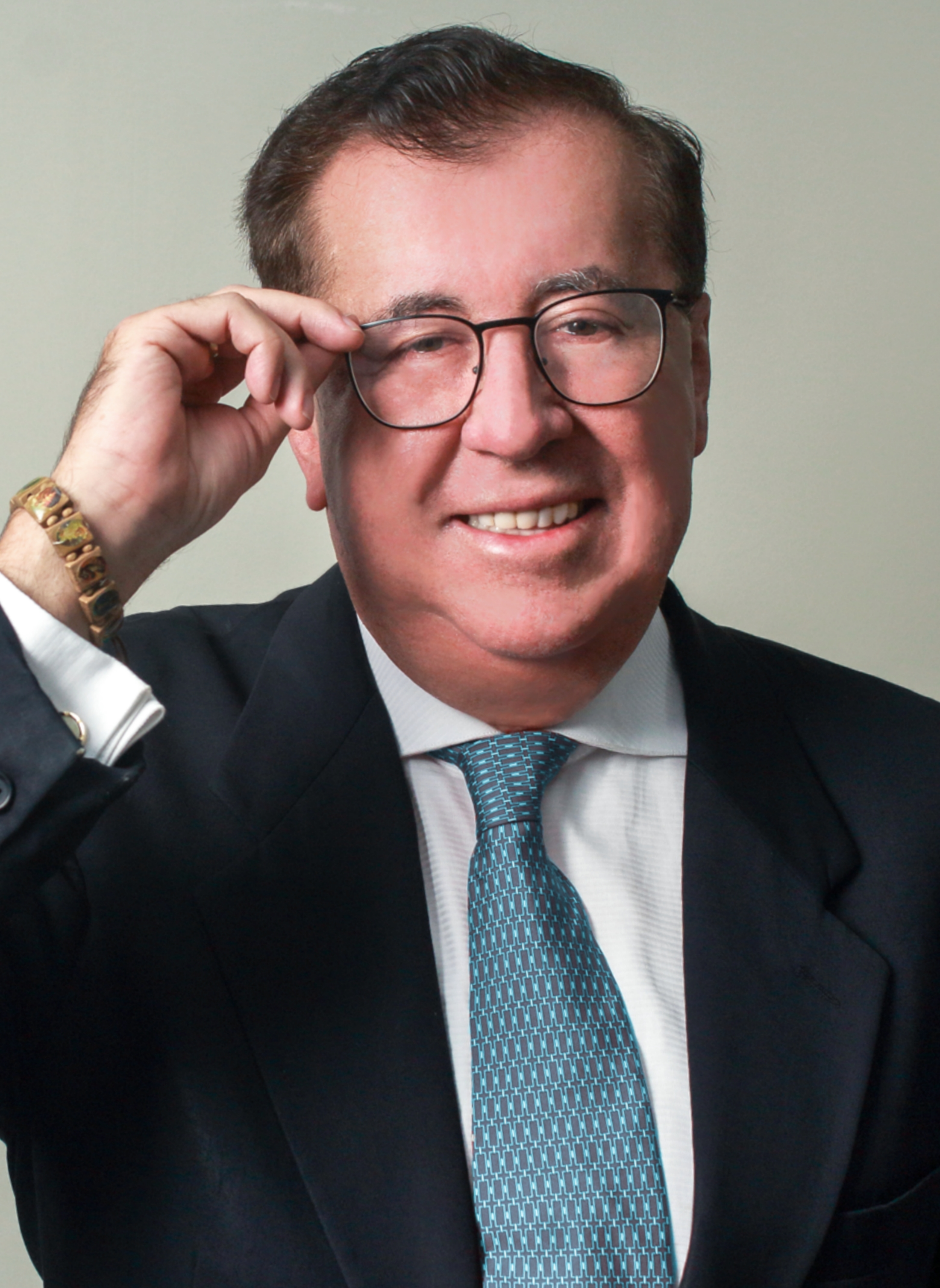
- Pérez Vivas in 2023

45th Governor of Táchira
- In office 5 January 2008 – 21 December 2012
- Preceded by: Ronald Blanco La Cruz
- Succeeded by: José Gregorio Vielma Mora

Deputy of the National Assembly for Táchira State
- In office 14 August 2000 – 5 January 2006

Member of the Chamber of Deputies for Táchira State
- In office 23 January 1989 – 22 December 1999

Personal details
- Born: César Alejandro Pérez Vivas; 24 April 1957 (age 69) La Grita, Táchira, Venezuela
- Party: Copei
- Spouse: Genny Morales de Pérez
- Children: 2
- Education: Catholic University of Tachira
- Profession: Politician, Lawyer

César Alejandro Pérez Vivas (born 24 April 1957), is a Venezuelan lawyer and politician associated with COPEI in Táchira State. From 2008 to 2012, he was the Governor of Táchira.

== Career ==
He studied the secondary level at Jáuregui, a military school from Táchira State. Later Pérez Vivas got graduated as a lawyer at the Catholic University of Tachira. Finally he did the postgraduate level at Central University of Venezuela. Pérez Vivas worked also as a university lecturer.

Pérez Vivas was chosen Youth Secretary of COPEI -Táchira in 1977. Later he became National Youth Secretary of that party. From 2002 to 2007, Pérez Vivas was the General Secretary of COPEI. In 1983 Pérez Vivas was elected a deputy of the Asamblea Legislativa of Táchira State, a kind of state legislature. From 1988 to 1998 Pérez Vivas worked as a deputy of the Venezuelan National Congress. In 2000, he won a seat at the National Assembly of Venezuela. In 2005 he decided not to compete for a re-election as deputy.

On 28 September 2008, Pérez Vivas won a primary election done by some political parties opposed to Hugo Chávez to select the candidate to the governor's office of Táchira State. On 23 November, he became the winner during the Venezuelan regional elections with 49% of the votes, according to the first bulletin from the CNE.

== See also ==
- Táchira state
- List of Venezuela governors

== Sources ==
- www.cesarperezvivas.com (in Spanish)
