= Members of the 2017 National Constituent Assembly of Venezuela =

This is the list of members elected in the 2017 Constituent National Assembly of Venezuela following the 30 July 2017 elections. The first session of the assembly began on 4 August 2017 in the Oval Room of the Palacio Federal Legislativo. The Democratic Unity Roundtable—the opposition to the incumbent ruling party—also boycotted the election claiming that the Constituent Assembly was "a trick to keep [the incumbent ruling party] in power." Since the opposition did not participate in the election, the incumbent Great Patriotic Pole, dominated by the United Socialist Party of Venezuela, won almost all seats in the assembly by default (503 out of 545 seats).

On 8 August 2017, the Constituent Assembly declared itself to be the government branch with supreme power in Venezuela, banning the opposition-led National Assembly from performing actions that would interfere with the assembly while continuing to pass measures in "support and solidarity" with President Maduro. On 18 August 2017, the Constituent Assembly gave itself the power to pass legislation and override the National Assembly on issues concerning “preservation of peace, security, sovereignty, the socio-economic and financial system” and then stripped the National Assembly of its legislative powers the following day. The opposition-led National Assembly responded, stating it would not recognize the Constituent Assembly.

As of May 2019, the Constituent Assembly mandate is expected to expire on 31 December 2020, a measure that replaces the previous resolution of August 2017 that established its validity for at least two years.

== Presidency ==
=== President ===
- Delcy Rodríguez (2017–18)
- Diosdado Cabello (2018–2020)

=== First Vice President ===
- Elvis Amoroso (2017)
- Aristóbulo Istúriz (2017–18)
- Tania Díaz (2018–2020)

=== Second Vice President ===
- Isaías Rodríguez (2017)
- Elvis Amoroso (2017–18)
- Gladys Requena (2018–2020)

=== Presidential commission ===
Member	Party	Previous position in Bolivarian Government
Elías Jaua	PSUV	Minister of Education
Diosdado Cabello	PSUV	Former President of the National Assembly (2012–16) and current deputy
Adán Chávez	PSUV	Minister of Culture
Isaías Rodríguez	PSUV	Venezuelan Ambassador to Italy
Aristóbulo Istúriz	PSUV	Minister of Communes and Social Movements
Hermann Escarrá	PSUV	Government Advisor and Constitutionalist Advocate
Earle Herrera	PSUV	National Assembly deputy
Iris Varela	PSUV	Minister of Venezuelan Penitentiary Service
Noelí Pocaterra	PSUV	Secretary of Indigenous Peoples and Communities of Zulia
Cilia Flores	PSUV	National Assembly deputy, First Lady of Venezuela
Delcy Rodríguez	PSUV	Minister of Foreign Affairs (2015–17)
Francisco Ameliach	PSUV	Governor of Carabobo (2012–17)

Other members include:

- Nicolás Maduro Guerra – son of President Nicolás Maduro
- Carmen Meléndez – former Minister of Defense
- On 4 September 2017, Earle Herrera, the president of a Constituency commission, resigned, alleging sectarianism during the election of the commission presidents, which he did not agree with.

== Constituent members ==
=== Capital District (Distrito Capital) ===
- Cilia Flores
- Delcy Rodríguez
- Iris Varela
- Jesus Faría Tortosa
- Juan Carlos Alemán Pérez
- Luis Rafael Durán Gamboa
- Ángelo Eduar Rivas Rivas

=== Amazonas ===
- Atures Municipality: Miguel Rodríguez y Antonio José Rumbos Oviedo
- Atabapo Municipality: Eneida Leini Rivas Delgado
- Maroa Municipality: Fernando Henriquez
- Manapiare Municipality: Frank León Pérez

=== Anzoátegui ===
- Simón Bolívar Municipality: Aristóbulo Istúriz Almeida and Nigel del Valle Barrolleta Carvajal
- Aragua Municipality: Juan de Dios Figueredo González
- Anaco Municipality: Francisco Solórzano
- Bruzual Municipality: Luis José Marcano Salazar
- Freites Municipality: Hernán Rodríguez
- Independencia Municipality: Carlos Eduardo Vargas
- Libertad Municipality: Luis Antonio Fernández León
- Miranda Municipality: Carlos José Andrade Salazar
- Monagas Municipality: José Gregorio Rivero Romero
- Peñalver Municipality: Alexander Rafael Zabala Zabala
- Simón Rodríguez Municipality: Earle Herrera Silva
- Sotillo Municipality: Ingrid Cortez González
- Guanipa Municipality: Ana Rosa Sánchez de Martínez
- Guanta Municipality: Herminia García Ron
- Píritu Municipality: William Antonio Petit
- Urbaneja Municipality: Luis Vásquez
- Carvajal Municipality: José Miguel Figueroa
- Santa Ana Municipality: Fredy Ramón Fernández Bernal
- Capistrano Municipality: María de Los Ángeles Travieso
- Mac Gregor Municipality: Hernán José Zurita
- Cajigal Municipality: Antonio José Goffin Molero

=== Apure ===
- San Fernando Municipality: Germán Eduardo Piñate Rodríguez and Héctor Orlando Zambrano
- Pedro Camejo Municipality: Alinne Rafael Rodríguez Martínez
- Achaguas Municipality: Cesar Temistocle Galipolly Laya
- Rómulo Gallegos Municipality: Enma Graciela Díaz De Solórzano
- Muñoz Municipality: Yoel Lisandro Solórzano

=== Aragua ===
- Girardot Municipality: Ricardo Antonio Molina Peñaloza and Roque Valero Pérez
- Bolívar Municipality: Elisa Gómez
- Camatagua Municipality: Humelvis Gutiérrez
- Libertador Municipality: Jesús Pérez
- Ribas Municipality: Rosa León
- Francisco Linares Alcántara Municipality: Ismael Morales
- Mario Briceño Iragorry Municipality: Víctor Flores
- Zamora Municipality: Rodulfo Pérez
- Lamas Municipality: Quember Piña
- Revenga Municipality: Leanci Tovar
- Costa de Oro Municipality: Antonio Guanipa
- San Casimiro Municipality: Mayker López
- Mariño Municipality: Joana Sánchez
- San Sebastián Municipality: Félix Romero
- Sucre Municipality: Elvis Amoroso
- Santos Michelena Municipality: Víctor Trejo
- Tovar Municipality: Ignacio Kanzler
- Urdaneta Municipality: Aidelys Oyon

=== Barinas ===
- Barinas Municipality: Adán Chávez and Argenis Aldazoro
- Arismendi Municipality: Rafael Rojas
- Andrés Eloy Blanco Municipality: Sergio Uzcátegui
- Bolívar Municipality: Luis Núñez
- Cruz Paredes Municipality: Alfredo Chirinos
- Obispos Municipality: Marly Aparicio
- Rojas Municipality: Jorge Salcedo
- Sosa Municipality: Argenis Durán
- Sucre Municipality: Víctor Guerrero
- Ezequiel Zamora Municipality: Yovanny Barrera Bencomo
- Alberto Arvelo Torrealba Municipality: Arnoldo Avancini
- Pedraza Municipality: Kedwin Albarrán

=== Bolívar ===
- Heres Municipality: Rubén Eladio Pinto and Victoria Mercedes Mata García
- Caroní Municipality: Richard Rosa
- Sifontes Municipality: Anioli Josefina Martínez
- Gran Sabana Municipality: Cecilio Pérez Peña
- Roscio Municipality: Wuihelm Torrellas
- Sucre Municipality: Alberto Aray

=== Carabobo ===
- Valencia Municipality: Francisco José Ameliach Orta and Juan Carlos Otaiza Castillo
- Libertador Municipality: Saúl Ortega Campos
- Naguanagua Municipality: Busy Galeano
- San Diego Municipality: Jorge Delgado
- Los Guayos Municipality: Douglas Romero Arcila
- Carlos Arvelo Municipality: Héctor Agüero
- Guacara Municipality: Edgar Arteaga Matute
- San Joaquín Municipality: Jorge Gregorio Muñoz
- Diego Ibarra Municipality: Rafael Ramos
- Bejuma Municipality: Neider Lara Graterol
- Montalbán Municipality: Tarcia Morillo
- Miranda Municipality: Juan Carlos López
- Puerto Cabello Municipality: Basew Asfur Yhmaidan
- Juan José Mora Municipality: Yildre Villegas

=== Cojedes ===
- Ezequiel Zamora Municipality: Érika del Valle Farías Peña and Jorge Adrián Pérez Jiménez
- Tinaquillo Municipality: Asdrúbal Salazar
- Lima Blanco Municipality: Nosliw Rodríguez
- Girardot Municipality: Luis Gerardo Ramírez
- Anzoátegui Municipality: José Gregorio Herrera
- Ricaurte Municipality: María Adela Ramírez
- Rómulo Gallegos Municipality: Hilda Yamilet Prieto
- Tinaco Municipality: Adelaida Párraga

=== Delta Amacuro ===
- Tucupita Municipality: Pedro Carreño y Carlos Enrique Gómez
- Antonio Díaz Municipality: Amado Antonio Heredia Bolaño
- Pedernales Municipality: Zaida Maita
- Páez Municipality: Yrenia Dayana Rivera Bustamante

=== Falcón ===
- Miranda Municipality: Víctor José Clark Boscán and Ana Carolina Brea de Cova
- Acosta Municipality: Henry Estrada.
- Bolívar Municipality: José Chirinos
- Buchivacoa Municipality: Bellirde Morales
- Colina Municipality: Charly García
- Democracia Municipality: Teresa Romero
- Federación Municipality: Wilmer García
- Carirubana Municipality: Miriam González
- Los Taques Municipality: Juan Simón Primera
- Falcón Municipality: Humberto Clark
- Silva Municipality: Eduardo Rodríguez
- Mauroa Municipality: José Chirinos
- Zamora Municipality: Nataly Hernández
- Dabajuro Municipality: Fiorella Leal
- Monseñor Iturriza Municipality: Efren Borges
- Píritu Municipality: Andrés Eloy Méndez
- Petit Municipality: Erick Coronado Galicia
- San Francisco Municipality: Milagros Sequera
- Jacura Municipality: Luis Bello
- Palmasola Municipality: Juan Pablo Rangel
- Tocópero Municipality: Carolina Díaz
- Urumaco Municipality: David Josué De Jesús Díaz
- Unión Municipality: Francisco Arturo Herrera
- Sucre Municipality: Norvis Tobías Rojas
- Cacique Manaure Municipality: Deibis Jesús Sandoval

=== Guárico ===
- Roscio Municipality: Christhoper Constant Campos and Alexander García
- Chaguaramas Municipality: Lismar Carpio
- Pedro Zaraza Municipality: Adrián Maestre
- Santa María de Ipire Municipality: Guillermo Cedeño
- Ortiz Municipality: Pedro Suárez
- Las Mercedes del Llano Municipality: José Leopoldo Matos
- Leonardo Infante Municipality: Frang Morales
- Francisco de Miranda Municipality: Fernando Ríos
- Julián Mellado Municipality: César Gómez
- El Socorro Municipality: Juan Carlos Flores
- José Tadeo Monagas Municipality: Julio César Rivero
- Esteros de Camaguán Municipality: Gilberto Enrique Rivero
- San Gerónimo de Guayabal Municipality: Ruluc Solórzano
- San José de Guaribe Municipality: Rafael Solórzano
- José Félix Ribas Municipality: Ramón Magallanes

=== Lara ===
- Iribarren Municipality: Carmen Teresa Meléndez Rivas and Luis Jonás Reyes Flores
- Torres Municipality: Julio Chávez Meléndez
- Palavecino Municipality: Derbys Guédez Torres
- Crespo Municipality: Julio Alejandro Garcés
- Morán Municipality: Gisela Rodríguez
- Urdaneta Municipality: Nolberto Palmera Piña
- Jiménez Municipality: Jean Carlos Rodríguez
- Simón Planas Municipality: Ángel Prado Padua
- Andrés Eloy Blanco Municipality: Wilmer GranadilloF

=== Mérida ===
- Libertador Municipality: Yehison José Guzmán Araque and Simón Pablo Figueroa
- Alberto Adriani Municipality: Omar Sánchez Escalante
- Andrés Bello Municipality: Junior Avari Avendaño
- Arzobispo Chacón Municipality: Carlos Méndez Perdomo
- Campo Elías Municipality: Pedro Álvarez Rivas
- Julio César Salas Municipality: José Gutiérrez Hernández
- Justo Briceño Municipality: Luis Mateus Sánchez
- Santos Marquina Municipality: Bélgica Hungría Medina
- Antonio Pinto Salinas Municipality: José Rodríguez Márquez
- Obispo Ramos De Lora Municipality: Carlos Arellano Díaz
- Caracciolo Parra Olmedo Municipality: Luis Hiza Andrade
- Cardenal Quintero Municipality: Gerania Quintero Cuevas
- Rangel Municipality: Luis Espinoza Villamizar
- Rivas Dávila Municipality: Luis Martí Hernández
- Sucre Municipality: Mervin Maldonado
- Tovar Municipality: José Molina García
- Tulio Febres Cordero Municipality: José Gregorio Araujo
- Padre Noguera Municipality: Omar Antonio Contreras
- Aricagua Municipality: Martín Araque Escalona
- Miranda Municipality: Yusmary Rivas
- Pueblo Llano Municipality: Carlos Emiliano Salcedo
- Zea Municipality: Francisco Javier Peña Ochoa

=== Miranda ===
- Guaicaipuro Municipality: Wisely Álvarez and Ricardo Sánchez
- Acevedo Municipality: Nora Delgado
- Brión Municipality: Modesto Ruiz
- Independencia Municipality: Ismael Capinel
- Tomás Lander Municipality: Genkever Tovar
- Páez Municipality: Héctor Rodríguez
- Paz Castillo Municipality: Erick Lovera
- Plaza Municipality: Julián Rodríguez
- Sucre Municipality: José Ignacio Rangel Ávalos
- Baruta Municipality: Francisco González
- Urdaneta Municipality: Gabriela Simoza
- Zamora Municipality: Hermann Escarrá
- Cristóbal Rojas Municipality: Leonardo Montezuma
- Los Salias Municipality: José Ramón Martínez
- Andrés Bello Municipality: Álvaro Hidalgo
- Chacao Municipality: Luz Marina Ramírez
- Simón Bolívar Municipality: Héctor Mijares
- Carrizal Municipality: Jhorman Vargas
- Pedro Gual Municipality: Eligio Kiaro Díaz
- Buroz Municipality: Yohan Ponce
- El Hatillo Municipality: Gerardo Enrique Melo

=== Monagas ===
- Maturín Municipality: Diosdado Cabello Rondón and Ernesto Javier Luna González
- Libertador Municipality: Régulo José Reina
- Uracoa Municipality: Ernesto José Ruiz
- Sotillo Municipality: José Elias Bellorín
- Aguasay Municipality: Virgilio Elías Aguilera
- Santa Barbara Municipality: Rony Rafael Ruiz
- Ezequiel Zamora Municipality: Omar José Farías
- Cedeño Municipality: Adriana Josefina Veliz
- Acosta Municipality: Maria Gabriela Villaroel
- Piar Municipality: José Norberto Arévalo
- Caripe Municipality: Gustavo Adolfo Narváez
- Bolívar Municipality: Cirilo Antonio Rodríguez
- Punceres Municipality: Eddys David Aponte

=== Nueva Esparta ===
- Arismendi Municipality: Hantony Rafael Cohello Bello and Maira Josefina Velásquez López
- Antolín del Campo Municipality: Rafael Salazar
- Marcano Municipality: Karina Aguilera
- Maneiro Municipality: Rino Machado
- Península de Macanao Municipality: Eliézka Millán
- Tubores Municipality: Gustavo Salazar
- Mariño Municipality: Yul Armas
- Gómez Municipality: Eleonor Vásquez
- Villalba Municipality: Luis Emilio Romero
- García Municipality: Edith Cardona
- Díaz Municipality: José del Carmen Millán

=== Portuguesa ===
- Genaro Boconoíto Municipality: Evelio Montilla Durán
- Papelón Municipality: Yidagna Dayana Mena
- Santa Rosalía Municipality: Yaneth López
- José Vicente de Una Municipality: Franklin Alexis González

=== Sucre ===
- Sucre Municipality: Gilberto Pinto Blanco and Tania Valentina Díaz
- Bolívar Municipality: Francisco Antonio Sánchez
- Bermúdez Municipality: Carmen González
- Cruz Salmerón Acosta Municipality: Erick Mago
- Montes Municipality: Eustorgio Bello
- Cajigal Municipality: Félix Barrios
- Mejía Municipality: Yonny Rafael Patiño Rivas

=== Táchira ===
- San Cristóbal Municipality: Temistocles Salazar and Gerardo Barrera
- Miranda Municipality: Tulio Vivas
- Ayacucho Municipality: Ana Maryoly Ramírez Sayago
- Jáuregui Municipality: César Macario Sandoval
- Samuel Maldonado Municipality: Eduardo Antonio Jaimes
- Torbes Municipality: Edwin Rueda
- Andrés Bello Municipality: Javier Duarte Gerdel
- Antonio Rómulo Acosta Municipality: Genyi Sánchez
- Bolívar Municipality: Miguel Puche
- Cardenas Municipality: Gerzon González
- Córdoba Municipality: Jessica Moreno
- Fernández Feo Municipality: Hebert Delgado
- García de Hevia Municipality: Yorlet Gil
- Guásimos Municipality: Yeshosua Faratro
- Independencia Municipality: Eleazar López
- José María Vargas Municipality: Johnny Roa
- Junín Municipality: Víctor Ballesteros
- Libertad Municipality: Williams Parada
- Libertador Municipality: Julio García Zerpa
- Lobatera Municipality: Johana Rosales
- Michelena Municipality: Ely Pernía
- Panamericano Municipality: Flor Ramírez
- Pedro María Ureña Municipality: Ely Serrano Fontana
- Rafael Urdaneta Municipality: Raúl Villamizar
- San Judas Tadeo Municipality: Freddy Zambrano
- Seboruco Municipality: Jesús Ramírez
- Simón Rodríguez Municipality: Elimar Ramírez
- Sucre Municipality: José Manuel Chacón
- Uribante Municipality: Alexis Ramírez

=== Trujillo ===
- Trujillo Municipality: Irayluz Terán and Angerson Hernández
- Rafael Rangel Municipality: Jean Carlos Olmos
- Boconó Municipality: Yolmar Gudiño
- Carache Municipality: Milagros Moreno
- Escuque Municipality: Tomás Lucena
- Urdaneta Municipality: Alexis González
- Valera Municipality: Zoraida Gil
- Candelaria Municipality: Alba Nieves
- Miranda Municipality: Loengri Matehus
- Monte Carmelo Municipality: Héctor Peña
- Montalbán Municipality: Janeth Araujo
- Pampán Municipality: Stalin Nava
- San Rafael de Carvajal Municipality: Wilsson Marín
- Sucre Municipality: Victoria Araujo
- Andrés Bello Municipality: José Reyes
- Bolívar Municipality: Alirio Rangel
- José Felipe Márquez Cañizález Municipality: Jean Carlos Fuentes
- Campo Elías Municipality: Gerardo Márquez
- La Ceiba Municipality: Darlin José Moreno
- Pampanito Municipality: Ledy Torres

=== Vargas ===
- Vargas Municipality: Ramón Darío Vivas Velasco and Juan Alejandro Iriarte Ortiz

=== Yaracuy ===
- San Felipe Municipality: Carlos Gamarra and Lilian Rodríguez
- Bolívar Municipality: Angélica Sánchez
- Bruzual Municipality: Adelmo León
- Nirgua Municipality: Jaydee Huérfano
- Sucre Municipality: Luis Sierra
- Urachiche Municipality: Omar Oviedo
- José Antonio Páez Municipality: Freddy Narváez
- La Trinidad Municipality: Mirlen Ramírez
- Cocorote Municipality: Adonay Romero
- Independencia Municipality: Nestor León
- Arístides Bastidas Municipality: Francisco Daza
- Manuel Monge Municipality: Martín Corbo
- Veroes Municipality: Santos Aguilar
- Peña Municipality: Isidro García

=== Zulia ===
- Maracaibo Municipality: Willy Jakson Casanova Campos and Fidel Madroñero
- San Francisco Municipality: Lisandro Cabello
- Mara Municipality: Sergio Fuenmayor
- Colón Municipality: Blagdimir Labrador
- Cabimas Municipality: Frank Carreño
- Jesús Enrique Lossada Municipality: Sinecio Junior Mujíca
- Guajira Municipality: Fermín Montiel
- Santa Rita Municipality: Mairelys Barboza
- Jesús María Semprún Municipality: Keirineth Fernández
- Baralt Municipality: Samuel Contreras Blanco
- Miranda Municipality: José Medina
- Sucre Municipality: Gulliver Antunez Montero
- La Cañada de Urdaneta Municipality: Johnny Bracho
- Lagunillas Municipality: José Luis Bermúdez
- Valmore Rodríguez Municipality: Javier Briceño
- Almirante Padilla Municipality: Alberto Sobalvarro
- Simón Bolívar Municipality: Joseph Parra
- Rosario de Perijá Municipality: Esmeidi Josefina González
- Catatumbo Municipality: Oladis Villasmil
- Francisco Javier Pulgar Municipality: Yendire Granados
- Machiques de Perijá Municipality: Anuar Younese Maali

== Sectoral constituent members ==
Below are the people who make up the National Constituent Assembly for each sector:

=== Workers ===
==== Public Administration Sector ====
- Alexis José Corredor Pérez
- David Enrique Freitez Garrido
- Diva Ylayaly Guzmán León
- Elbano de Jesús Sánchez Pérez
- Emigdio Hernán Iriarte Bolívar
- Esteban Steve Arvelo Ruiz
- Euclides Amador Campos Aponte
- Fernando Ernesto Rivero Osuna
- Franklin Salvador Rondón Mata
- Gerdul Alberto Gutiérrez Azuaje
- Jacobo Torres De León
- Luis Enrique Araujo Noguera
- Nicolás Ernesto Maduro Guerra
- Pedro Miguel Arias Palacios
- Ricardo Alberto Moreno Sosa
- Roberto Jesús García Messuti
- Willian Rafael Gil Calderón

==== Commerce and Banking Sector ====
- Avilio José Echenique
- Deibi Javier Ocanto Vegas
- Eglé de los Santos Sánchez
- Elia Ramona Díaz
- Eliana Rosa Leal Natera
- Frank José Quijada Carmona
- Jesús Alberto Guédez Peña
- José Gregorio González Figueroa
- Lili Josefina Rincón Urdaneta
- María Isolina Leonet Navarro
- Olinda Mirella Peroza

==== Construction Sector ====
- Francisco Javier García Aarón
- José Orlando Bracca Barrera
- Marco Tulio Díaz
- Raúl Ernesto Román Marín

==== Popular and Independent Economy Sector ====
- Alberto José Aranguibel Brito
- Alexis José Tovar
- Carmen Tibisay Márquez de Miranda
- Emma Elinor Cesin Centeno
- Gino González
- José Misael Chaurán Hernández
- Loa Daniela Rivas Díaz
- María Alejandra Díaz Marín
- Mario Silva García
- Orlando Antonio Castillo Chirivella
- Sol Elena Mussett de Primera

==== Industries Sector ====
- Ángel Bautista Marcano Castillo
- Ernesto Agustín Rivero Cañas
- Frank Reinaldo Márquez López
- Gleiman Rafael Vanegas Moreno
- José Gregorio Gil Armas
- Yahirys Karminia Rivas Freites

==== Oil and Mining Sector ====
- Sandra María Nieves
- Wils Asención Rangel Linares

==== Services Sector ====
- Betssy Carolina Rivero Sarmiento
- Ernesto Jesús Antonio Rodríguez Guerra
- Fernando Augusto de Sousa Morales
- José David Mora
- José Rafael Novoa Jiménez
- Juan José Salazar Agreda
- Laura Nohely Alarcón Vera
- Luis Rafael Carrero Abarca
- Luz Coromoto Chacón Mendoza
- Mercedes Coromoto Gutiérrez Muñoz
- Nelson Jesús Herrera Pérez
- Raúl Antonio Ordóñez Paz
- Richard Verde Briceño
- Williams Edgardo Golindano Cedeño

==== Social Sector ====
- Alcides Antonio Castillo Jiménez
- Carlos Enrique López Sánchez
- Esther Tamar Quiaro Vargas
- Gregoria Caridad Laya Morgado
- Octavio Nicolás Solórzano
- Orlando Enrique Pérez Oropeza
- Oswaldo Emilio Vera Rojas
- Rafael Anaximenes Torrealba Ojeda
- Rodbexa Mercedes Poleo Vidoza
- Sandino Rafael Primera Mussett
- Telémaco Ramón Figueroa
- Zulay Josefina Maestre de Acosta

==== Transport Sector ====
- Edison Alberto Alvarado Gil
- Francisco Alejandro Torrealba Ojeda

=== Pensioners ===
==== Capital Region ====
- Aleydys Argelia Manaure de Costas
- David Rafael Paravisini García
- Gladys del Valle Requena
- Israel Alberto López Rodríguez
- Julio Rafael Escalona Ojeda
- Néstor José Francia Echenique
- Rafael José Argotty Zambrano

==== Andean Region ====
- Dionisia Mijoba

=== Indigenous communities ===
People who make up the National Constituent Assembly, elected by indigenous peoples and communities in accordance with their ancestral customs and practices in general assemblies, in three established regions:

==== Western region ====
- Aloha Joselyn Núñez Gutiérrez
- Noelí Pocaterra de Oberto
- Indira Celina Fernández Duarte
- Freddy José Panapera Jorgito

==== Eastern region ====
- Clara Josefina Vidal de Pérez
- Zoila Milagros Yánez
- Elías Rafael Romero

==== Southern region ====
- José Nelson Mavio Martínez

== See also ==
- Members of the 1999 National Constituent Assembly of Venezuela
- 2017 Constituent National Assembly
