= II National Assembly of Venezuela =

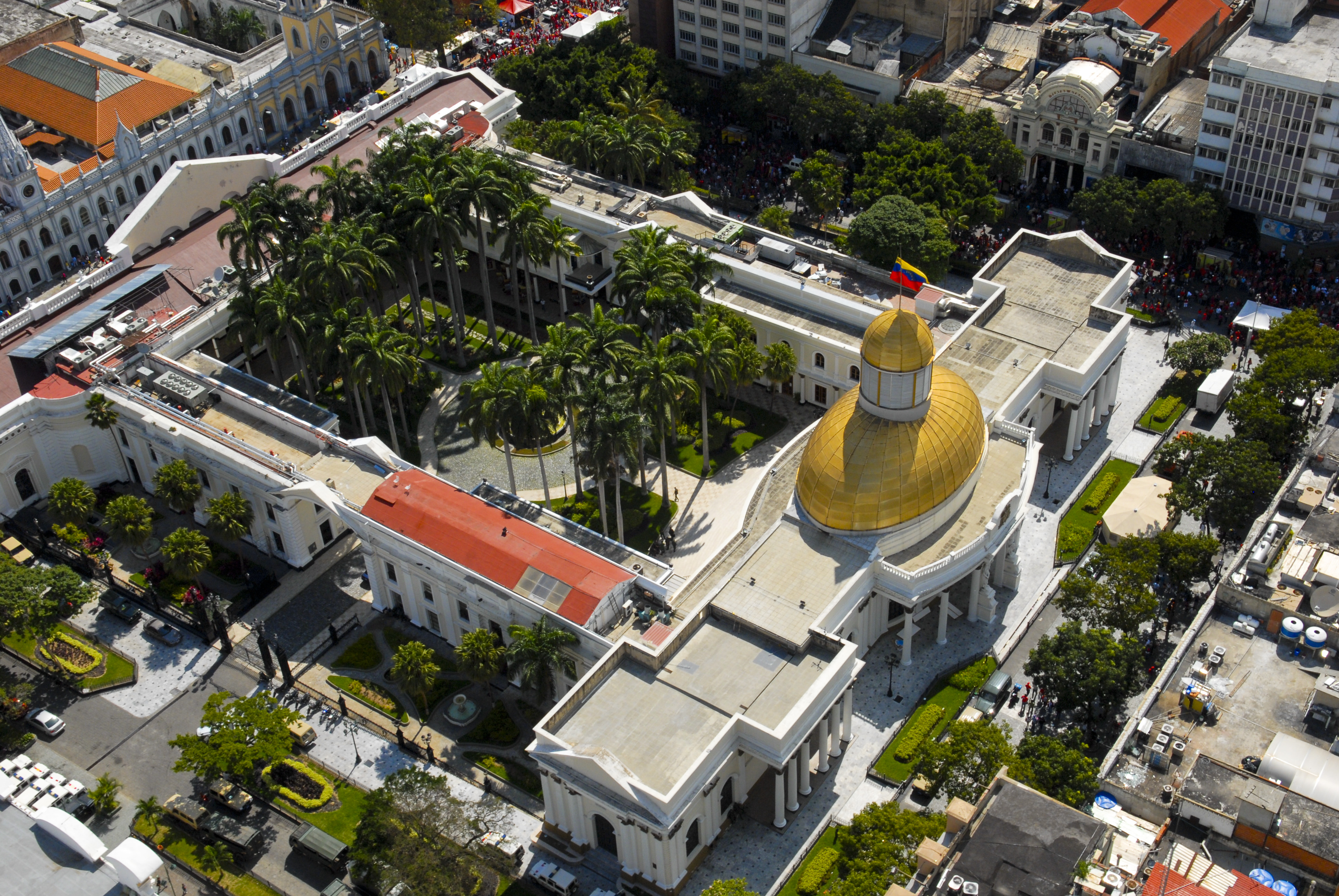
National Assembly of Venezuela

The II National Assembly of Venezuela was a meeting of the legislative branch of Venezuelan federal government, comprising the National Assembly of Venezuela. It met in Caracas after 2005 Venezuelan parliamentary election.

== Leadership ==
No.	Portrait	Name	Term of Office		State	Legislature	Party
3		Nicolás Maduro	5 January 2005	7 August 2006	Capital District	2nd	Fifth Republic Movement
4		Cilia Flores	15 August 2006	5 January 2011	Capital District	2nd	Fifth Republic Movement
4		Cilia Flores	15 August 2006	5 January 2011	Capital District	2nd	United Socialist Party

== Parties ==
Updated on October 5, 2010.

Party	Sign
Partido Socialista Unido de Venezuela	PSUV
Por la Democracia Social	Podemos
Patria Para Todos	PPT
Frente Popular Humanista	FPH
Partido Comunista de Venezuela	PCV
Movimiento Ecológico de Venezuela	MOVEV
Independents	
TOTAL	

== Color codes ==
Coordinadora Democrática/Democratic Unity Roundtable/Anti-Chavism/Opposition
Chavismo/Fifth Republic Movement/United Socialist Party of Venezuela/Pro-government

== Members ==
Nº	Representative	State	Party	Original party
1	Diógenes Edgildo Palau Patiño	Amazonas	PSUV	PUAMA
2	Juan Montenegro Núñez	Amazonas	PSUV	PPT
3	Carmen Rodríguez Rauseo	Anzoátegui	PSUV	MVR
4	Earle Herrera	Anzoátegui	PSUV	MVR
5	Eduardo Arónica Carreyó	Anzoátegui	PSUV	MVR
6	Henry Tachinamo	Anzoátegui	PSUV	MVR
7	Hugo Márquez Rodríguez	Anzoátegui	PSUV	MVR
8	Luis Sánchez Chacón	Anzoátegui	PSUV	MVR
9	Vicente Rodríguez Longart	Anzoátegui	PSUV	Podemos
10	Carlos Espinoza León	Apure	PSUV	MVR
11	Cristóbal Jiménez	Apure	PSUV	MVR
12	Fahd El Gatrif Mizher	Apure	PSUV	MVR
13	Rafael Delgado Camejo	Apure	PSUV	MVR
14	Wilfredo González Venero	Apure	PSUV	MVR
15	Carlos Escarrá	Aragua	PSUV	MVR
16	Eddy Gómez	Aragua	PSUV	MVR
17	Eleazar Nieves Colmenarez	Aragua	PSUV	MVR
18	Elvis Amoroso	Aragua	PSUV	MVR
19	Roy Alberto Daza	Aragua	PSUV	MVR
20	William Querales	Aragua	PSUV	Podemos
21	Geovanni Peña González	Barinas	PSUV	MVR
22	Gonzálo Gualdrón	Barinas	PSUV	MVR
23	Jesús Graterol Camacho	Barinas	PSUV	MVR
24	Wilmer Pérez	Barinas	PSUV	MVR
25	Adel El Zabayar Samara	Bolívar	PSUV	MVR
26	Ángel Marcano Castillo	Bolívar	PSUV	MVR
27	Berkis Solís De Sorrentino	Bolívar	PSUV	MVR
28	Rafael Ríos Bolívar	Bolívar	PSUV	MVR
29	Rafael Gil Barrios	Bolívar	PSUV	MVR
30	Carmen Montilla	Carabobo	PSUV	MVR
31	Fernando Vásquez Gusmán	Carabobo	PSUV	Podemos
32	Israel Sotillo	Carabobo	PSUV	MVR
33	Orlando García Prado	Carabobo	PSUV	MVR
34	Osmar Enrique Gómez Denis	Carabobo	PSUV	MVR
35	Raúl Álvarez Bracamonte	Carabobo	PSUV	MVR
36	Saúl Ortega	Carabobo	PSUV	MVR
37	Asdrúbal Coromoto Salazar	Cojedes	PSUV	MVR
38	Hayden Pirela	Cojedes	PSUV	MVR
39	Jhonny Milano Rodríguez	Cojedes	PSUV	PPT
40	Juan Bautista Pérez	Cojedes	PSUV	MVR
41	Loa Del Valle Tamaronis	Delta Amacuro	PSUV	Mi Gente
42	Omar Marcano Rodríguez	Delta Amacuro	PSUV	PCV
43	Henry Hernández	Delta Amacuro	PSUV	UPV
44	Carlos Medina Rojas	Distrito Capital	PSUV	MVR
45	Cilia Flores	Distrito Capital	PSUV	MVR
46	Darío Vivas	Distrito Capital	PSUV	MVR
47	Desirée Santos Amaral	Distrito Capital	PSUV	MVR
48	Flor Ríos	Distrito Capital	PSUV	MVR
49	Juan Carlos Dugarte	Distrito Capital	PSUV	MVR
50	Luis Beltrán Blanco	Distrito Capital	PSUV	MVR
51	Pedro Lander	Distrito Capital	PSUV	MVR
52	Reinaldo García Bravo	Distrito Capital	PSUV	MVR
53	Tirso Silva	Distrito Capital	PSUV	MVR
54	Alberto Castellar	Falcón	PSUV	MVR
55	Aleydys Manaure Costas	Falcón	PSUV	PCV
56	Andrés Eloy Méndez	Falcón	PSUV	MVR
57	Henry Baldayo	Falcón	PSUV	MVR
58	Maris Eizaga Rujano	Falcón	PSUV	MVR
59	Ulises Daal	Falcón	PSUV	Independent
60	Ángel Landaeta Domínguez	Guárico	PSUV	MVR
61	Eustoquio Contreras	Guárico	PSUV	MEP
62	Juan José Marín Laya	Guárico	PSUV	PPT
63	Briccio Urdaneta	Lara	PSUV	MVR
64	Denis Peraza	Lara	PSUV	Abre Brecha
65	Germán Darío Ferrer	Lara	PSUV	MVR
66	Iván Lugo Rodríguez	Lara	PSUV	MVR
67	José David Mora	Lara	PSUV	MVR
68	José Rafael Escalona	Lara	PSUV	MVR
69	Luis Contreras Hernández	Lara	PSUV	MVR
70	Pastor Paucides González	Lara	PSUV	MVR
71	Juan Carlos Pimentel	Mérida	PSUV	MVR
72	José Ramírez Rosales	Mérida	PSUV	MVR
73	Manuel Briceño Mendez	Mérida	PSUV	MVR
74	María Alejandra Ávila Ávila	Mérida	PSUV	MVR
75	Obdulio Camacho	Mérida	PSUV	MVR
76	Augusto Montiel	Miranda	PSUV	MVR
77	Aurora Morales	Miranda	PSUV	MVR
78	Carlos Echezuría Rodríguez	Miranda	PSUV	MVR
79	Carmen Álvarez Alfonzo	Miranda	PSUV	MVR
80	Félix Leonett Canales	Miranda	PSUV	MVR
81	Haydée Machín	Miranda	PSUV	MVR
82	Iroshima Bravo	Miranda	PSUV	MVR
83	Jesús Álvarez González	Miranda	PSUV	MVR
84	Luis Gamargo	Miranda	PSUV	Podemos
85	Maigualida Barrera	Miranda	PSUV	MVR
86	Modesto Ruíz Espinoza	Miranda	PSUV	PCV
87	Romelia Matute	Miranda	PSUV	MVR
88	Tulio Amado Jiménez	Miranda	PSUV	MVR
89	Girardot Cabello	Monagas	PSUV	Podemos
90	Jesús Domínguez	Monagas	PSUV	MIGATO
91	Marelis Pérez Marcano	Monagas	PSUV	MVR
92	Santana Figueroa	Monagas	PSUV	MVR
93	Manuel Villalba Sánchez	Monagas	PSUV	PPT
94	Juan José Millán	Nueva Esparta	PSUV	Podemos
95	Juan García Hernández	Nueva Esparta	PSUV	MVR
96	María del Rosario Pacheco	Nueva Esparta	PSUV	MVR
97	Régulo Hernández	Nueva Esparta	PSUV	MVR
98	Alfredo Murga Rivas	Portuguesa	PSUV	MVR
99	Francisco Torrealba	Portuguesa	PSUV	MVR
100	José Rodríguez García	Portuguesa	PSUV	MVR
101	Porfirio Hernández Parra	Portuguesa	PSUV	MVR
102	Zark Lara Barrios	Portuguesa	PSUV	UPPI-FIORP
103	Erasmo Marcano	Sucre	PSUV	MVR
104	José del Carmen Rodríguez	Sucre	PSUV	MVR
105	Yaritza Vallenilla	Sucre	PSUV	MVR
106	Hernán Pacheco	Táchira	PSUV	MVR
107	Jóse Sanguino Cárdenas	Táchira	PSUV	MVR
108	Julio García Jarpa	Táchira	PSUV	MVR
109	Iris Varela	Táchira	PSUV	MVR
110	Santa Mogollón	Táchira	PSUV	Podemos
111	Juan Mendoza Jover	Trujillo	PSUV	MVR
112	Julio Moreno Viloria	Trujillo	PSUV	MVR
113	Orésteres Leal	Trujillo	PSUV	MVR
114	Oscar Pérez Cristancho	Trujillo	PSUV	MVR
115	Malaquías Gil	Trujillo	PSUV	Podemos
116	José Guido de Freitas	Vargas	PSUV	MVR
117	Oswaldo Vera Rojas	Vargas	PSUV	MVR
118	Simón Escalona Prado	Vargas	PSUV	MVR
119	Braulio José Álvarez	Yaracuy	PSUV	MVR
120	Carlos Gamarra	Yaracuy	PSUV	PPT
121	Carmen Saez	Yaracuy	PSUV	PPT
122	Ricardo Capella	Yaracuy	PSUV	AMANSA
123	Calixto Ortega	Zulia	PSUV	MVR
124	Edis Ríos Becerra	Zulia	PSUV	MVR
125	Eliseo Peña Pineda	Zulia	PSUV	MVR
126	Énder Palomares	Zulia	PSUV	MVR
127	Francisco López Almao	Zulia	PSUV	MVR
128	Jenny Cedeño Márquez	Zulia	PSUV	Podemos
129	Libes González González	Zulia	PSUV	Podemos
130	Lisandro Cabello	Zulia	PSUV	LAGO
131	María Briceño de Queipo	Zulia	PSUV	MVR
132	Mario Isea	Zulia	PSUV	PPT
133	Omar Osorio López	Zulia	PSUV	Podemos
134	Rafic Souki Rincón	Zulia	PSUV	MVR
135	Roberto Quintero Valencia	Zulia	PSUV	MVR
136	Leonidas Gonzales	Zulia	PSUV	MVR
137	José Poyo	Indigenous peoples	PSUV	CONIVE
138	Noelí Pocaterra	Indigenous peoples	PSUV	CONIVE
139	Esteban Argelio Pérez Ramos	Indigenous peoples	PSUV	FUNDACIDI
1	Ismael García	Aragua	UPP	Podemos
2	Wilmer Azuaje	Barinas	UPP	Frente Humanista
3	Juan José Molina	Bolívar	UPP	Podemos
4	Pastora Medina	Bolívar	UPP	Frente Humanista
5	Luis Díaz Salazar	Monagas	UPP	Frente Humanista
6	Ricardo Gutiérrez Briceño	Portuguesa	UPP	Podemos
7	Hermes García Font	Sucre	UPP	Podemos
8	Bernardo Jiménez Álvarez	Sucre	UPP	Podemos
9	José Ramón Regnault	Sucre	UPP	Frente Humanista
10	Tomás Sánchez	Yaracuy	UPP	Frente Humanista
11	Arcadio Montiel	Zulia	UPP	Podemos
1	Julio Haron Ygarza	Amazonas	PPT	MUPI
2	Laura Vals	Carabobo	PPT	PPT
3	Enrique González	Delta Amacuro	PPT	PPT
4	José Albornoz	Guárico	PPT	PPT
5	Wilmer Iglesias	Mérida	PPT	PPT
6	José Simón Calzadilla	Lara	PPT	PPT
1	Oscar Figuera	Aragua	PCV	PCV
2	Diluvina Cabello	Bolívar	PCV	PCV
3	Douglas Eduardo Gómez	Carabobo	PCV	PCV
4	Edgar Lucena	Carabobo	PCV	PCV
5	Edgar Lucena	Táchira	PCV	PCV
1	Pedro Bastidas	Aragua	MOVEV	MVR
1	Miguel Rojas	Guárico	Independent	MVR

== See also ==
- I National Assembly of Venezuela
- III National Assembly of Venezuela
- IV National Assembly of Venezuela
- V National Assembly of Venezuela
- VI National Assembly of Venezuela
