= Members of the 1999 National Constituent Assembly of Venezuela =

This is the list of members elected in the 1999 Constituent National Assembly of Venezuela.

== Presidency ==
- Luis Miquilena (President)
- Isaías Rodríguez (First Vice President)
- Aristóbulo Istúriz (Second Vice President)

== Secretaries ==
- Elvis Amoroso
- Alejandro Andrade

== Constituent Members ==
=== National ===
- Claudio Fermín
- Alfredo Peña
- Allan Brewer-Carías
- Ángela Zago
- Earle Herrera
- Edmundo Chirinos
- Eustoquio Contreras
- Guillermo García Ponce
- Hermann Escarrá
- Jesús Rafael Sulbarán
- Leopoldo Pucho
- Luis Vallenilla
- Manuel Quijada
- Marisabel de Chávez
- Pablo Medina
- Pedro Ortega Díaz
- Reyna Romero García
- Ricardo Combellas
- Tarek William Saab
- Vinicio Romero Martínez

=== Capital District ===
- Desirée Santos Amaral
- Eliézer Reinaldo Otaiza Castillo
- Ernesto Alvarenga
- Freddy Alirio Bernal Rosales
- Julio César Alviárez
- Nicolás Maduro Moros
- Segundo Meléndez
- Vladimir Villegas

=== Amazonas ===
- Liborio Guarulla
- Nelson Silva

=== Anzoátegui ===
- Ángel Rodríguez
- David de Lima Salas
- David Figueroa
- Elías López Portillo
- Gustavo Pereira

=== Apure ===
- Cristóbal Jiménez
- Rafael Rodríguez Fernández

=== Aragua ===
- Alberto Jordán Hernández
- Antonio di Giampaolo Bottini
- Carlos Tablante
- Humberto Prieto
- Oscar Feo

=== Barinas ===
- Francisco Visconti Osorio
- José León Tapia

=== Bolívar ===
- Alejandro de Jesús Silva Marcano
- Antonio Briceño
- Daniel Díaz
- Leonel Jiménez Carupe
- Victoria Mata

=== Carabobo ===
- Elio Gómez Grillo
- Manuel Vadell Graterol
- Américo Díaz Núñez
- Blancanieve Portocarrero
- Diego Salazar
- Francisco Ameliach
- Juan José Marín Laya
- Oscar Navar Tortolero
- Saúl Ortega

=== Cojedes ===
- Haydée de Franco
- Juan Bautista Pérez

=== Delta Amacuro ===
- César Pérez Marcano
- Ramón Antonio Yánez

=== Falcón ===
- Jesús Montilla Aponte
- Sol Musset de Primera
- Yoel Acosta Chirinos

=== Guárico ===
- Ángel Eugenio Landaeta
- Pedro Solano Persomo
- Ruben Alfredo Ávila Ávila

=== Lara ===
- Antonio José García García
- Enrique Peraza
- Henri Falcón
- Lenín Romero
- Luis Reyes Reyes
- Mirna Teresa Vies de Álvarez
- Reinaldo Rojas

=== Mérida ===
- Adán Chávez Frías
- Florencio Antonio Porras Echezuría
- Pausides Segundo Reyes Gómez

=== Miranda ===
- Elías Jaua
- Freddy Gutiérrez
- Haydeé Machín
- José Gregorio Vielma Mora
- José Vicente Rangel
- Luis Camargo
- Miguel Madriz
- Raúl Esté
- Rodolfo Sanz
- Willian Lara
- William Ojeda

=== Monagas ===
- José Gregorio Briceño
- Marelis Pérez Marcano
- Numa Rojas Velásquez

=== Nueva Esparta ===
- Alexis Navarro Rojas
- Virgilio Ávila Vivas

=== Portuguesa ===
- Antonia Muñoz
- Miguel Garranchán Velásquez
- Wilmar Soteldo

=== Sucre ===
- Jesús Molina Villegas
- José Luis Meza
- Luis Augusto Acuña Cedeño

=== Táchira ===
- Iris Varela
- Ronald Blanco La Cruz
- Samuel López
- Temístocles Salazar

=== Trujillo ===
- Gerardo Márquez
- Gilmer Viloria

=== Vargas ===
- Antonio Rodríguez
- Jaime Barrios

=== Yaracuy ===
- Braulio Álvarez
- Néstor León Heredia

=== Zulia ===
- Alberto Urdaneta
- Atala Uriana
- Froilán Barrios Nieves
- Gastón Parra Luzardo
- Geovanny Darío Finol Fernández
- Ildefonso Finol
- Jorge Luis Durán Centeno
- Levy Arrón Alter Valero
- María de Queipo
- Mario Isea Bohórquez
- Rafael Colmenárez
- Roberto Jiménez Maggiolo
- Silvestre Villalobos

=== Indigenous communities ===
- Guillermo Guevara
- José Luis González
- Noelí Pocaterra

== See also ==
- Members of the 2017 National Constituent Assembly of Venezuela
- 1999 Constituent National Assembly
