= Darío Vivas =

Venezuelan politician (1950–2020)

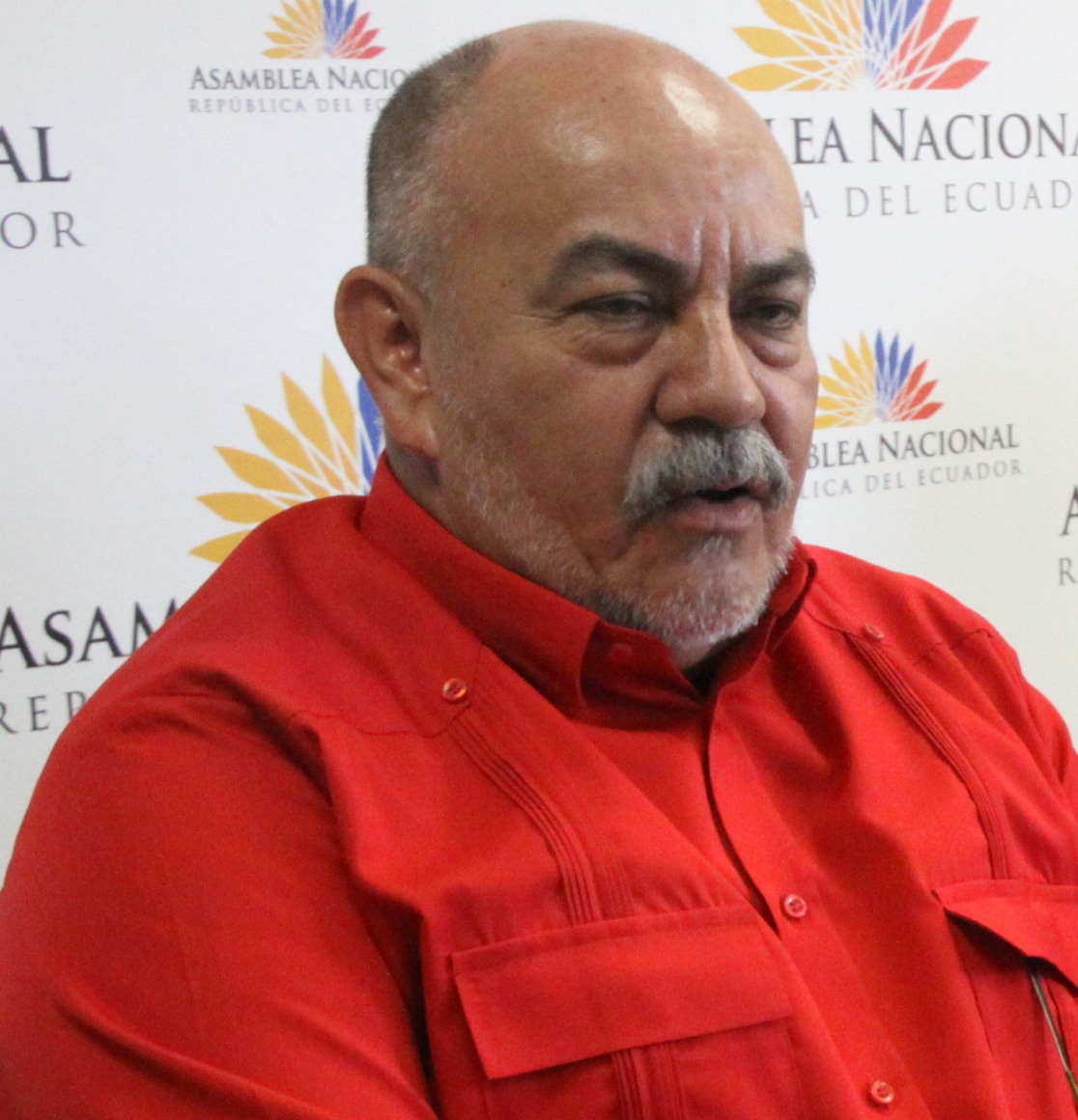
- Vivas in 2013

Head of Government of the Capital District of Venezuela
- In office 29 January 2020 – 13 August 2020
- Appointed by: Nicolás Maduro
- Preceded by: Carolina Cestari
- Succeeded by: Jacqueline Faría

President of the Fundación Audiovisual Nacional de Televisión ANTV
- In office 15 January 2016 – 13 August 2020

Member of the National Assembly for Vargas state
- In office 15 January 2016 – 29 January 2020

Member of the National Assembly for the Capital District
- In office 5 January 2006 – 5 January 2011

First Vice President of the National Assembly of Venezuela
- In office 5 January 2013 – 5 January 2015
- Preceded by: Aristóbulo Istúriz
- Succeeded by: Elvis Amoroso

First Vice President of the National Assembly of Venezuela
- In office 5 January 2010 – 5 January 2011
- Preceded by: Saúl Ortega
- Succeeded by: Aristóbulo Istúriz

Personal details
- Born: Darío Ramón Vivas Velasco; January 12, 1950 San Cristóbal, Táchira, Venezuela
- Died: August 13, 2020 (aged 70) Caracas, Venezuela
- Cause of death: COVID-19
- Party: United Socialist Party of Venezuela (PSUV)
- Education: Universidad Católica Santa Rosa

Darío Ramón Vivas Velasco (12 June 1950 – 13 August 2020) was a Venezuelan politician, member of the 2017 National Constituent Assembly and the Governor of the Capital District.

Vivas formerly served as National Assembly deputy representing the Capital District for two consecutive periods. He also served as its first vice president twice (2010–2011) and (2013–2015) and as vice president of the Inter-Parliamentary Union Conference in 2015.

== Political career ==
He was Director of Tours and Events for the Fifth Republic Movement (MVR) until 2006, when the party was renamed to the United Socialist Party of Venezuela (PSUV), where Vivas held the same position of Director of tours and events.

He served as a member of the National Assembly of Venezuela for two consecutive periods from 2010 to 2017, separating from his position to run for the next election. On 30 July 2017, he was re-elected as a member of the National Constituent Assembly.

== Death ==
During the COVID-19 pandemic in Venezuela, Vivas announced that he had tested positive for COVID-19 on 19 July 2020. He died from the virus on 13 August 2020, at the age of 70.

== Laws ==
The laws promoted by Darío Vivas as Deputy to the National Assembly have included:

- Reform of the Electoral Processes (2009)
- Community Council Law Reform (2009)
- Creation of the Two Level Municipal Regime of the Metropolitan Area (2009)
- Special Law of the Capital District Regime (2009)
- Capital District Budget Law (2009)
- Law on Protection of Mortgage Debtors (2007)

== Sanctions ==
=== United States ===
On 9 August 2017, the United States Department of the Treasury placed sanctions on Vivas for his position in the 2017 Constituent Assembly of Venezuela.

=== Panama ===
On 29 March 2018, Vivas was sanctioned by the Panamanian government for his alleged involvement with "money laundering, financing of terrorism and financing the proliferation of weapons of mass destruction."

=== Canada ===
Responding to the May 2018 presidential election, Canada sanctioned 14 Venezuelans, including Vivas, stating that the "economic, political and humanitarian crisis in Venezuela has continued to worsen as it moves ever closer to full dictatorship". The government said the 2018 presidential election was "illegitimate and anti-democratic," and sanctioned Vivas, along with 13 other members of the Constituent Assembly and Supreme Court.
