= Zago =

Zago may refer to:

- Zago (character), from the Zago, Jungle Prince comic books
- Zago (surname), an Italian surname, including a list of persons with the surname
