= Dionisia Mijoba =

Venezuelan politician

Dionisia de Jesús Mijoba Juárez (c. 1938-9 September 2017) was a Venezuelan politician who served as a member of Venezuela's 2017 National Constituent Assembly until her death.

== Career ==
Mijoba was elected as a member of Venezuela's 2017 National Constituent Assembly by the Pensioners Sector of the Andean Region after repeat elections were held in the Mérida and Táchira states on 13 August 2017. She was sworn into office on 22 August, which she held until her death on 9 September as a result of a cardiac arrest.

== See also ==
- Members of the 2017 National Constituent Assembly of Venezuela
