= Adina Bastidas =

Venezuelan economist and politician

Vice President of Venezuela
- In office 24 December 2000 – 13 January 2002
- President: Hugo Chávez
- Preceded by: Isaías Rodríguez
- Succeeded by: Diosdado Cabello

Personal details
- Born: 11 June 1943 (age 82) Caracas, Venezuela
- Party: Independent
- Profession: Economist

Adina Mercedes Bastidas Castillo (born 11 June 1943) is a Venezuelan economist, formerly active in politics. She was appointed the vice president of Venezuela on 24 December 2000 by President Hugo Chávez, and served in the post until 13 January 2002, the first woman to hold the job in the country's history. She was later appointed Production and Commerce Minister.

Bastidas was also the Director for the Bolivarian Republic of Venezuela at the Inter-American Development Bank in Washington, D.C..

== Views ==
According to the BBC, Bastidas is considered a controversial left winger; she is also considered a prominent critic of Venezuela's private sector. Her appointment as Commerce Minister, coming after weeks of protests against President Chávez's economic policies, was seen as a further radicalization of Chávez's government, according to the BBC. Chávez called her "a first class revolutionary", and deemed her work "exceptional".

At the Latin American and Caribbean Encounter on the Dialogue of Civilizations, held in Caracas on November 8, 2001, Bastidas said:

"The terrorism of the oppressed is a perverse and lamentable byproduct of a WASP dominance that has become unbearable for the most radical and violent of the subjugated peoples ... Supplications and reason will not suffice to impose dialogue on countries of the North. The South must achieve a capacity to unite, resist, and persevere until it attains a new world order that is truly an order, not an immense disorder, under the heavens."

== Personal life ==
On 13 January 2015, Bastidas was subject to burglary and robbery at her penthouse in Caracas, as stated by her son on his Twitter account. She refused to make any public statements regarding the event.

== Notes ==
Political offices
Preceded by Isaías Rodríguez	Vice President of Venezuela; 2000–2002	Succeeded by Diosdado Cabello Rondón
