= Zago (surname) =

Zago is an Italian surname derived from the Greek word διάκος (diákos, "deacon") and originally referred to a religious authority of the minor orders. It is most prevalent in the northern regions of Veneto, Lombardia and Piemonte and is also to be found among the Brazilian, French and Argentinian Italian diaspora.

== People with the surname Zago ==
- Alvise Zago (born 1969), former Italian footballer
- Ángela Zago, Venezuelan journalist, writer and former guerrilla fighter
- Antônio Carlos Zago (born 1969), former Brazilian footballer
- Emilio Zago (1852–1929), Italian actor
- Fernand Zago (1942–2022), former French rugby player
- Frédéric Zago (born 1963), former French footballer
- Giuseppe Zago (1881–1947), Italian actor
- Luigi Zago (1894–1952), Italian painter
- Marcello Zago (1932–2001), Italian priest
- Marco Antonio Zago (born 1946), Brazilian physician
- Santo Zago (16th-century), Italian painter
- Valentina Zago (born 1990), Italian volleyballer
