= Carlos Escarrá =

Venezuelan politician

Attorney General of Venezuela
- In office 30 August 2011 – 25 January 2012
- Preceded by: Margarita Méndola
- Succeeded by: Cilia Flores

Deputy of the National Assembly
- In office 5 January 2011 – 25 January 2012

Personal details
- Born: 27 November 1954 Venezuela
- Died: 25 January 2012 (aged 57)
- Party: Communist Party of Venezuela; Fifth Republic Movement; United Socialist Party of Venezuela
- Relatives: Hermann Escarrá (brother)
- Occupation: professor, lawyer

Carlos Escarrá Malavé (26 November 1954 – 25 January 2012) was a Venezuelan politician.

== Career ==
He served as attorney general of Venezuela and a member of the National Assembly of Venezuela for Aragua State, and was a member of the board of directors of the United Socialist Party of Venezuela (PSUV). He was a constitutional lawyer and a former judge for the Supreme Court of Venezuela. In August 2011, he was chosen as attorney general by lawmakers allied with President Hugo Chávez.

Escarrá died of a heart attack on January 25, 2012, and was replaced by Cilia Flores.
