= Aristóbulo Istúriz =

Venezuelan politician (1946–2021)

- Istúriz in 2019

Minister of Education
- In office 4 September 2018 – 27 April 2021
- President: Nicolás Maduro
- Preceded by: Elías Jaua
- Succeeded by: Eduardo Piñate
- In office 14 February 2001 – 5 January 2007
- President: Hugo Chávez
- Preceded by: Héctor Navarro
- Succeeded by: Adán Chávez

Minister for Communes and Social Movements
- In office 4 January 2018 – 4 September 2018
- President: Nicolás Maduro
- Preceded by: Kyra Andrade
- Succeeded by: Blanca Eekhout
- In office 6 January 2017 – 14 June 2017
- President: Nicolás Maduro
- Preceded by: Erika Farías
- Succeeded by: Kyra Andrade

Vice President of the Constituent Assembly
- In office 4 August 2017 – 17 August 2017
- President: Delcy Rodríguez
- Succeeded by: Elvis Amoroso; Tania Díaz

Vice President of Venezuela
- In office 6 January 2016 – 4 January 2017
- President: Nicolás Maduro
- Preceded by: Jorge Arreaza
- Succeeded by: Tareck El Aissami

Governor of Anzoátegui
- In office 16 December 2012 – 6 January 2016
- Preceded by: Tarek William Saab
- Succeeded by: Nelson Moreno

Deputy of the National Assembly of Venezuela
- In office 5 January 2000 – 16 December 2012
- Constituency: Capital District

Mayor of Libertator Municipality
- In office 6 January 1993 – 23 January 1996
- Preceded by: Claudio Fermín
- Succeeded by: Antonio Ledezma

Personal details
- Born: Aristóbulo Istúriz Almeida; 20 December 1946 Curiepe, Miranda, Venezuela
- Died: 27 April 2021 (aged 74) Caracas, Venezuela
- Party: Democratic Action (1960-1968); People's Electoral Movement (1968-1970); Radical Cause (1970-1997); Fatherland for All (1997-2007); United Socialist Party of Venezuela (2007-2021)
- Education: Pedagogic Institute of Caracas

Aristóbulo Istúriz Almeida (20 December 1946 – 27 April 2021) was a Venezuelan politician and academic. He was vice president of the Constituent Assembly of Venezuela (in August 2017) as well as vice president of Venezuela (from January 2016 to January 2017).

== Life and career ==
Istúriz Almeida was a professor at the Centro de Estudios del Desarrollo (CENDES) of the Universidad Central de Venezuela. He was elected to Parliament several times for Acción Democrática, representing the Federal District (now the Capital District), before joining the Radical Cause in 1986. He was elected as Mayor of the Libertador Municipality of Caracas on 6 December 1992, serving in that post until 2 January 1996. After finishing his term as mayor (having lost his re-election bid to Antonio Ledezma), he became co-presenter of the Globovisión television show Blanco y Negro.

In 1997, together with other ex-Radical Cause members, he co-founded Homeland for All (Patria Para Todos, PPT), which in the 1998 presidential election decided to support Hugo Chávez. Between 2001 and 2007 he served as Minister of Education in Chávez's government. In 2008 Istúriz was the pro-Chávez Patriotic Alliance's candidate for Mayor of Caracas; he was narrowly defeated. He was leader of the Venezuelan teachers' association SUMA for a time.

In the 2012 regional elections, he was elected Governor of Anzoátegui.

On 6 January 2016, President Nicolás Maduro appointed Istúriz as Vice President of Venezuela. He remained in office for one year, until Tareck El Aissami was appointed to succeed him on 4 January 2017. In October 2017, Istúriz ran again for governor of Anzoátegui. He lost to MUD/AD candidate Antonio Barreto Sira.

== Death ==
Istúriz died on 27 April 2021, following complications from open-heart surgery.

== Controversy ==
=== Sanctions ===
Canada sanctioned 40 Venezuelan officials, including Istúriz, in September 2017. Canada's foreign affairs department said the sanctions were for behaviors that undermined democracy after at least 125 people were killed in the 2017 Venezuelan protests and "in response to the government of Venezuela's deepening descent into dictatorship"; Chrystia Freeland, Foreign Minister said, "Canada will not stand by silently as the government of Venezuela robs its people of their fundamental democratic rights."

== See also ==
- Members of the 1999 National Constituent Assembly of Venezuela
- Members of the 2017 National Constituent Assembly of Venezuela
- Sanctions during the Venezuelan crisis
- State protector

Political offices
| Preceded by Claudio Fermín | Mayor of Libertador Municipality; 1992–1995 | Succeeded by Antonio Ledezma |
| Preceded by Tarek Saab | Governor of Anzoátegui; 2012–2016 | Succeeded by Nelson Moreno |
| Preceded by Jorge Arreaza | Vice President of Venezuela; 2016–2017 | Succeeded by Tareck El Aissami |
| New office | Vice President of the Constituent Assembly of Venezuela; 2017 | Succeeded by Elvis Amoroso |
Government offices
| New office | Minister of Education; 2001–2007 | Succeeded by Adán Chávez |
Assembly seats
| New office | Member of the Constituent Assembly of Venezuela for the municipality of Simón Bolívar, Anzoátegui; 2017–2021 | Vacant |
