= Hermann Escarrá =

Venezuelan lawyer (born 1952)

Hermann Eduardo Escarrá Malave (born 8 April 1952) is a Venezuelan lawyer, university professor and political analyst. He was a member of the National Constituent Assembly since 2017.

== Political history ==
=== Education and opposition to Bolivarian government ===
Graduated with honors from the faculty of law of the Central University of Venezuela, Escarrá was previously a member of the COPEI party. After the victory of Hugo Chávez in the 1998 elections, he became a member of the 1999 Constituent National Assembly representing the Fifth Republic Movement.

Unlike his brother Carlos Escarrá, who was a militant of the ruling party, Escarrá strongly criticized Chavez in the coming years, filing appeals in the Supreme Tribunal of Justice against the president's actions, calling to ignore the government in December 2007 with a march to return to Miraflores, calling for an indefinite strike as parliamentarian after the expropriations in the South of the Lake of 2010, and describing in 2010 the Communes Law and the Communal Parliament as "a coup d'etat to the Constitution."

=== Support of the Bolivarian government ===
In September 2012, Escarrá made harsh criticisms of a supposed government plan that was attributed to Henrique Capriles and the campaign command of the Democratic Unity Roundtable. The opposition candidate declared that the documents and program made public by VTV and criticized by Escarrá were false and were not part of his campaign promise. These statements coincided with that of other political figures of the opposition and the support of President Hugo Chávez, thus generating an approach between both. Estas declaraciones coincidieron con la de otras figuras políticas de la oposición y el apoyo del presidente Chávez, generando así un acercamiento entre ambos.

After Nicolás Maduro was elected as the new president of Venezuela in April 2013, he served as an adviser and collaborator on constitutional issues; He has been named member of the dialogue tables with the opposition and of the Truth, Justice and Peace Commission. During the counting of signatures of the stage of promotion of the presidential referendum of Venezuela from 2016–2017, he was a legal consultant to the governmental commission for the recall.

Following the 2017 Venezuelan Constituent Assembly election, Escarrá is currently a member of the presidential commission for the 2017 National Constituent Assembly for the circuit of Guatire, Miranda. In October of the same year, Escarrá proposed to the new Venezuelan constitution of Venezuela to punish citizens who commit treason against the fatherland.

== Sanctions ==
On 9 August 2017, the United States Department of the Treasury placed sanctions on Escarrá for his position in the Presidential Commission in the 2017 Constituent Assembly of Venezuela.

Months later, Canada sanctioned Escarrá on 22 September 2017 due to alleged "rupture of Venezuela's constitutional order."

On 29 March 2018, Escarrá was sanctioned by the Panamanian government for his alleged involvement with "money laundering, financing of terrorism and financing the proliferation of weapons of mass destruction".
