= Tania Díaz =

Venezuelan journalist & politician (born 1963)

Tania Diaz
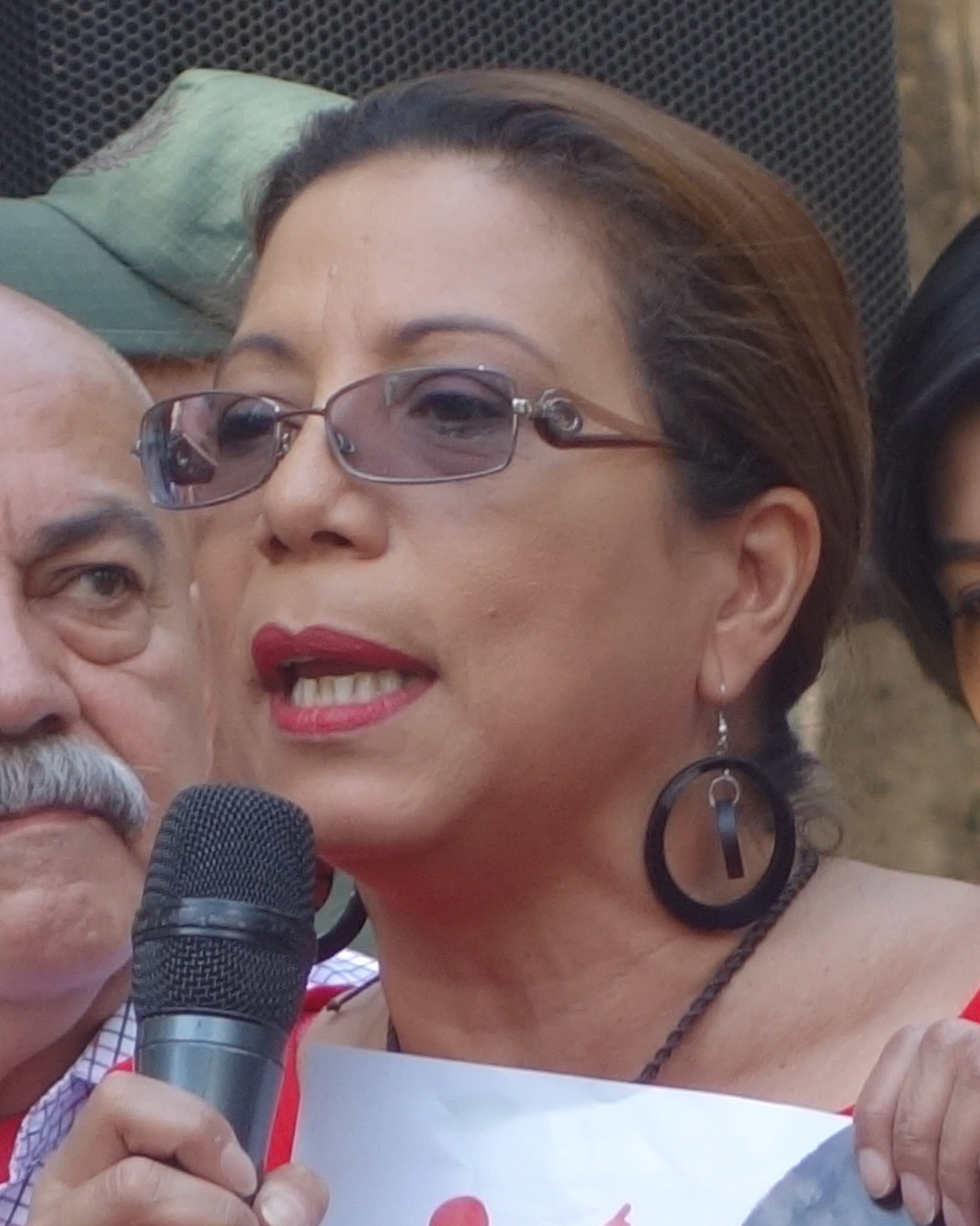

Vice-President of the Constituent Assembly
- In office 5 January 2018 – 18 December 2020
- President: Delcy Rodríguez; Diosdado Cabello
- Preceded by: Aristóbulo Istúriz
- Succeeded by: Position abolished

Second Vice President of the National Assembly of Venezuela
- In office 5 January 2015 – 5 January 2016

Deputy of the National Assembly
- In office 2 February 2012 – 5 January 2016

Minister of Popular Power for Communication and Information
- In office 2010–2010
- President: Hugo Chavez
- Preceded by: Blanca Eekhout
- Succeeded by: Mauricio Rodríguez

Personal details
- Born: 18 June 1963 (age 63) Caracas, Venezuela
- Party: United Socialist Party of Venezuela (PSUV)

Tania Valentina Díaz González (born 18 June 1963) is a Venezuelan journalist and politician. She was deputy of the United Socialist Party of Venezuela (PSUV) representing the Capital District and Minister of Communication and Information of Venezuela in 2010, as well as deputy and second vice-president of the National Assembly until 2016. Diaz served as the last first vice president of the 2017 National Constituent Assembly (ANC).

== Biography ==
Tania Díaz was editor-in-chief of the Venpress news agency, host of opinion spaces on Radio Nacional de Venezuela, a journalist for the newspaper El Correo, and in 2012 for the state television channel Venezolana de Televisión.

In 2010, she was appointed as communications and information minister of Venezuela to replace Blanca Eekhout, but she is elected as deputy to the National Assembly for June. She was succeeded by Mauricio Rodríguez.

On February 2, 2012, Diaz is sworn in as the main deputy to the National Assembly to replace Cilia Flores, when Flores is appointed as Attorney General. Díaz served as president of the Permanent Commission of Popular Power and the Media.

On January 5, 2018, Tania Díaz was appointed as first vice president of the National Constituent Assembly (ANC).

== Sanctions ==
Responding to the May 2018 Venezuelan presidential election, Canada sanctioned 14 Venezuelans, including Díaz, stating that the "economic, political and humanitarian crisis in Venezuela has continued to worsen as it moves ever closer to full dictatorship." The government said the 2018 presidential election was "illegitimate and anti-democratic," and sanctioned Díaz, along with 13 other members of the ANC and TSJ.
