= Erika Farías =

Venezuelan politician (born 1972)

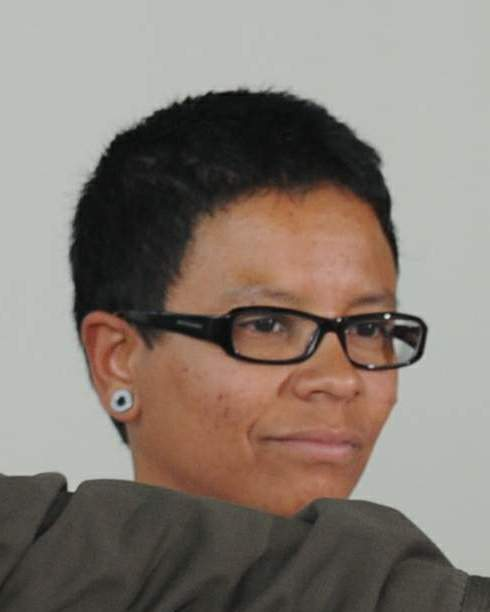
Erika Farías in 2012

Erika del Valle Farías Peña (born 30 October 1972) is a Venezuelan politician. She served as Minister for the Office of the Presidency three times as Minister for Urban Agriculture, Minister for the Communes and deputy to the 2017 National Constituent Assembly. She is a militant and member of the National Directorate of the United Socialist Party of Venezuela (PSUV), and is currently the mayor of the Libertador Bolivarian Municipality of Caracas.

== Biography ==
Farías is a graduate of the Libertador Experimental Pedagogical University. National Director of the Francisco de Miranda Front (Venezuelan youth political organization, dedicated to social work). She was Minister of Popular Power for Food and Minister of Popular Power of the Office of the Venezuelan Presidency during the mandate of President Hugo Chávez, deputy of the National Assembly for Cojedes in 2010. On 16 December 2012, she won the governor elections for the Cojedes State, with 75,383 votes.

She was appointed Minister of People's Power for Communes and Social Movements by Nicolás Maduro in 2016.

=== Sanctions ===
On 9 August 2017, the United States Department of the Treasury placed sanctions on Farías for her position in the 2017 Constituent Assembly of Venezuela.

Responding to the May 2018 Venezuelan presidential election, Canada sanctioned 14 Venezuelans on 30 May 2018, including Farías, stating that the "economic, political and humanitarian crisis in Venezuela has continued to worsen as it moves ever closer to full dictatorship". The government said the 2018 presidential election was "illegitimate and anti-democratic", and sanctioned Farías, along with 13 other members of the ANC and TSJ.
