= Ángela Zago =

Venezuelan journalist, writer and former guerrilla fighter

Member of the 1999 National Constituent Assembly of Venezuela
- In office 3 August 1999 – 31 January 2000

Personal details
- Occupation: Journalist, writer, guerrilla fighter

Ángela Zago is a Venezuelan former guerrilla fighter, journalist and writer. She served as a constituent of Venezuela's 1999 National Constituent Assembly.

== Career ==
During the 1960s, Angela Zago participated in the Venezuelan guerrilla movement of the time. Ángela Zago was elected as deputy to the National Constituent Assembly in 1999 for the Movimiento Quinta República (MVR) party, where she served as a member of the Security and Defense Committee.

In her literary career, Zago published in 1972 the book Aquí no ha pasado nada, in which she describes her role as a guerrilla fighter. The work has been translated and republished several times. In 1989 she published Existe la vida, in 1997 Sobreviví a mi madre, and in 1998 La rebelión de los ángeles.

== Personal life ==
Zago initially admired Chavismo before it came to power, publishing the book "The Rebellion of the Angels" in reference to the 1992 Venezuelan first coup attempt, subsequently adopted a critical stance towards it. This included Hugo Chávez's actions during the events of April 11, 2002, such as the activation of the Avila plan. Ángela is married to Napoleón Bravo, who is also a journalist.

== Works ==
- «Aquí no ha pasado nada» (1972)
- «Existe la vida» (1989)
- «Sobreviví a mi madre» (1997)
- «La rebelión de los ángeles» (1998)
