= Isaías Rodríguez =

Venezuelan politician (1942–2025)

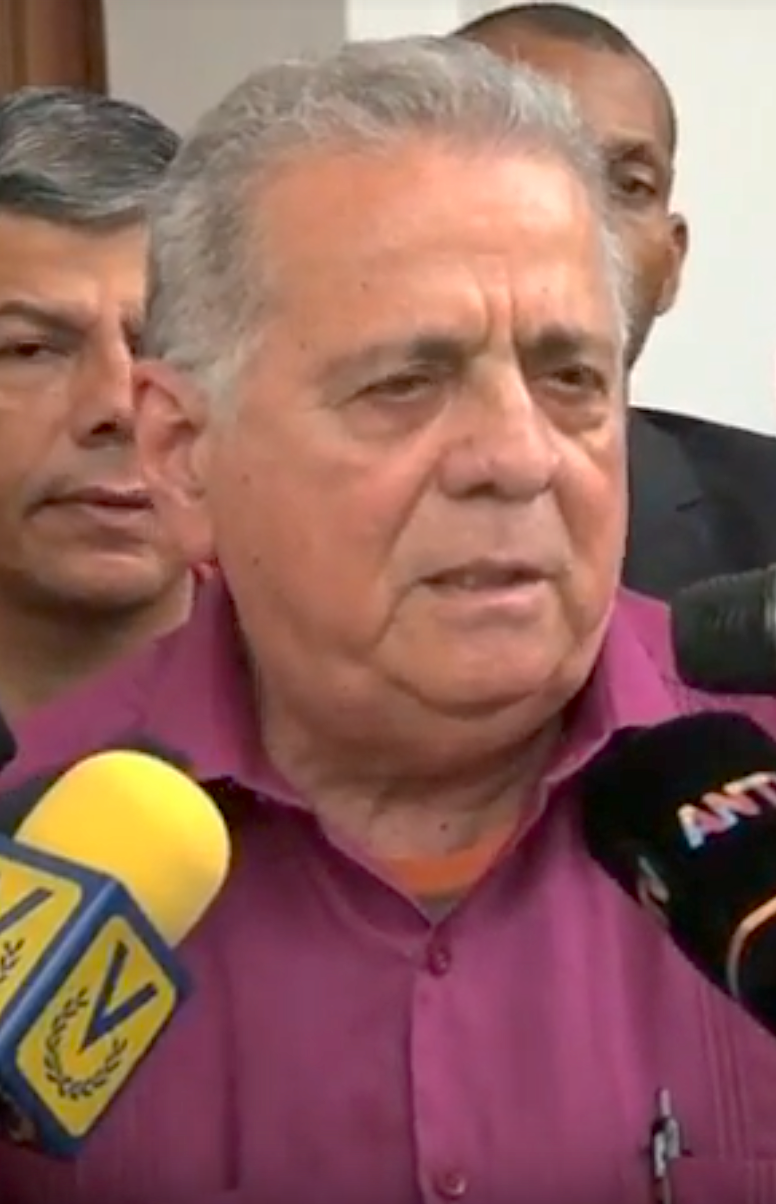
- Rodríguez in 2017

Vice President of Venezuela
- In office 29 January 2000 – 24 December 2000
- President: Hugo Chávez
- Preceded by: Position re-established (Title last held by José Vicente Gómez Bello)
- Succeeded by: Adina Bastidas

Ambassador of Venezuela to Italy
- In office 27 October 2017 – 21 May 2019
- President: Nicolás Maduro

Second Vice President of the National Constituent Assembly
- In office 4 August 2017 – 27 October 2017
- President: Delcy Rodríguez
- Preceded by: Position established
- Succeeded by: Elvis Amoroso

Prosecutor General of Venezuela
- In office 28 December 2000 – 13 December 2007
- Preceded by: Javier Elechiguerra
- Succeeded by: Luisa Ortega Díaz

Member of the Senate for Aragua State
- In office 23 January 1999 – 22 December 1999

Personal details
- Born: Julián Isaías Rodríguez Díaz; 16 December 1942 Valle de la Pascua, Venezuela
- Died: 12 January 2025 (aged 82) Caracas, Venezuela
- Party: PSUV (2007–2025)
- Other political affiliations: MVR (1997–2007); MEP (1967–1981); AD (before 1967)
- Children: 3
- Parent(s): Francisco Rodríguez; Luisa Díaz
- Occupation: Lawyer

Julián Isaías Rodríguez Díaz (16 December 1942 – 12 January 2025) was a Venezuelan politician, diplomat, and lawyer. A member of the United Socialist Party of Venezuela, he was appointed the vice president of Venezuela on 29 January 2000 by Hugo Chávez, and served in the post until 26 December 2000.

== Life and career ==
Rodríguez Díaz was born on 16 December 1942. He earned his law degree and specialized in labor law at the Universidad Central de Venezuela, where he began his political activities with the political party Democratic Action. He left Democratic Action in 1967 together with Luis Beltrán Prieto Figueroa to join the new Movimiento Electoral del Pueblo, which he participated in until 1981. In 1990 he served as Attorney Aragua.

In the elections of November 1998 he was elected to the Venezuelan Senate, representing the state of Aragua.

On 29 January 2000, he was appointed the first executive vice president of Venezuela. Eleven months later, on 26 December, with the majority vote of the National Assembly, he was appointed Attorney General of the Republic, a position he held until November 2007.

He was appointed Second Vice-President of the 2017 Constituent National Assembly on 4 August 2017 but he was replaced by Elvis Amoroso a month later.

Rodríguez died in Caracas on 12 January 2025, at the age of 82.

== Sanctions ==
In November 2017, Isaías Rodríguez was sanctioned by the United States Office of Foreign Assets Control after the 2017 Venezuelan Constituent Assembly election.

In March 2018, Panama sanctioned 55 public officials, including Isaías Rodríguez.

During 2018 until 2019 he worked as the Venezuelan Ambassador in Italy. During the 2019 Venezuelan presidential crisis, Rodríguez expressed concern for US sanctions on Venezuela. According to him, these sanctions prevented him paying his workers and the Embassy debt had risen to about €9 million. Rodríguez resigned from his job as ambassador in May due to the tight budget of the embassy. In his resignation letter published on Twitter, he expressed support for "Maduro's battle". He wrote that he was left "without money" and that the Italian bank has "closed its doors" to him.

Political offices
Preceded by Restored; Title last held by José Vicente Gómez	Vice President of Venezuela; 2000–2000	Succeeded by Adina Bastidas
