= Nicolás Maduro Guerra =

Venezuelan politician (born 1990)

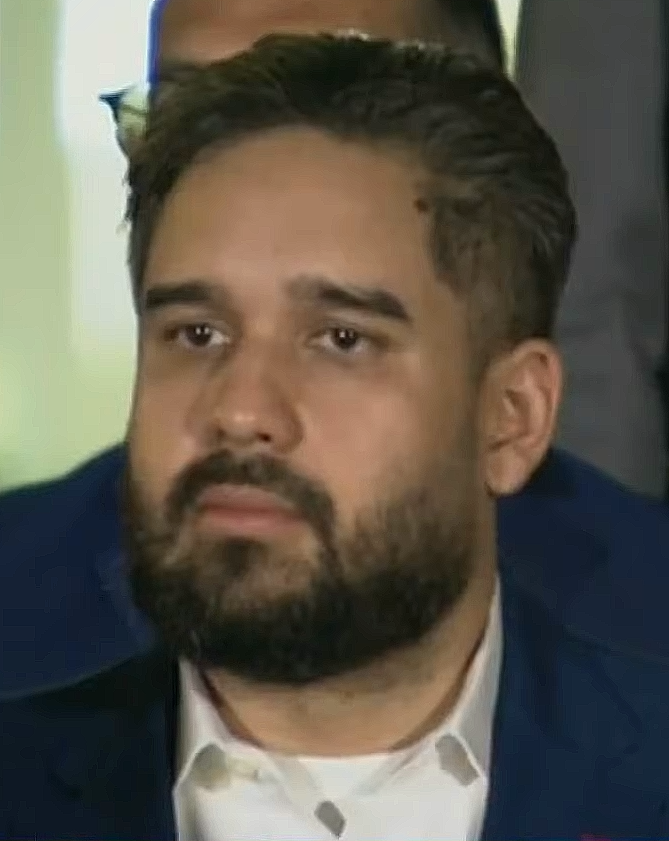
- Maduro Guerra in 2026

Member of the National Assembly
- Incumbent
- Assumed office 5 January 2021
- Constituency: La Guaira

Head of Corps of Special Inspectors of the Presidency of the Republic
- In office 23 September 2013 – 22 May 2021
- President: Nicolás Maduro
- Preceded by: Position established

Coordinator of National Film School of Venezuela
- In office 21 June 2014 – 2017
- President: Nicolás Maduro
- Preceded by: Position established
- Succeeded by: Patricia Villegas

Director General of Presidential Delegations and Instructions of the Vice President
- Incumbent
- Assumed office 25 January 2017
- President: Nicolás Maduro; Delcy Rodríguez (acting)
- Preceded by: Position established

Personal details
- Born: Nicolás Ernesto Maduro Guerra; 21 June 1990 (age 36) Caracas, Venezuela
- Party: United Socialist Party of Venezuela (since 2013)
- Spouse: Grysell Torres
- Children: 2
- Parent(s): Nicolás Maduro; Adriana Guerra Angulo
- Occupation: Politician, economist

Nicolás Ernesto Maduro Guerra (born 21 June 1990), also referred to as Nicolás Maduro Jr., Maduro Jr., or Nicolasito, is a Venezuelan politician and economist and the son of the President of Venezuela, Nicolás Maduro. Maduro Jr. has served as a deputy in the Venezuelan National Assembly in the V Legislature for the state of La Guaira since 2021, the unicameral legislative body of Venezuela. He was previously a member of the National Constituent Assembly between 2017 and 2020. He is a leader of the United Socialist Party of Venezuela (PSUV).

He served as head of the Corps of Special Inspectors of the Presidency and Coordinator of the National Film School of Venezuela, appointed by his father. Maduro Jr. also served in 2014 as the delegate of El Valle Capital District to the United Socialist Party of Venezuela party congress.

He has been charged in the United States for alleged drug trafficking, which he denies.

== Early life and education ==
Maduro Guerra was born in Venezuela on 21 June 1990. He is the son of his father's first marriage to Adriana Guerra Angulo. As a child, he was interested in arts and between 1998 and 2004, he was a flautist in Venezuela's El Sistema program. Though Maduro Guerra sought a career in music, he placed 77 of 235 on a waiting list for the National Experimental University of the Arts and decided to abandon the idea. His high school scores were "not extraordinary", he scored 42% in reading classes and 64% in mathematics, graduating from Liceo Urbaneja Achelpohl School.

Maduro Guerra attended the National Experimental University of the Armed Forces where he specialized in economics. In 2011, he began working for the Public Ministry of Venezuela until his condition became unknown among the organization in 2014.

== Political career ==
Maduro Guerra's political career began shortly after his father became President of Venezuela. On 23 September 2013, he was appointed by his father as Head of the Corps of Special Inspectors of the Presidency, an organization designated to observe the effects of policies implemented by the President of Venezuela. On his 24th birthday on 21 June 2014, his father again appointed him as Coordinator of the National Film School of Venezuela. Prior to his appointments, Maduro Guerra had little experience as a politician and no experience in cinema.

On 21 July 2014, the PSUV held a party congress and voted for Maduro Guerra to be a delegate for the El Valle Capital District.

=== Constituent Assembly ===
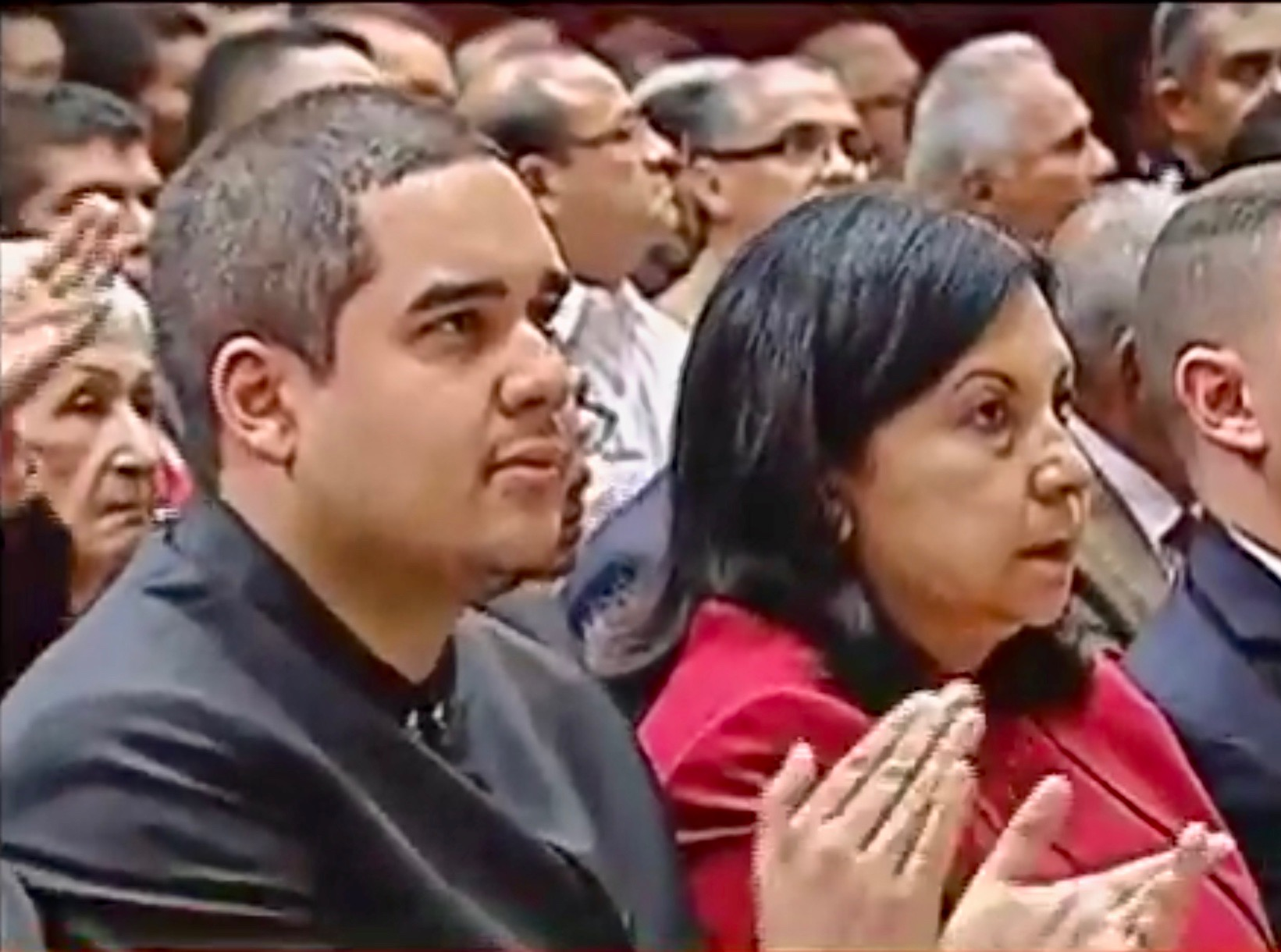
Maduro Guerra as a member of the 2017 Constituent Assembly of Venezuela beside Carmen Meléndez.

Following the 2017 Venezuelan Constituent Assembly election, Maduro Guerra was elected into the 2017 Constituent Assembly of Venezuela.

On 11 August 2017, US President Donald Trump said that he is "not going to rule out a military option" to confront the government of Nicolás Maduro and the deepening crisis in Venezuela. Maduro Guerra responded, stating during the 5th Constituent Assembly of Venezuela session that if the United States were to attack Venezuela, "the rifles would arrive in New York, Mr. Trump, we would arrive and [even] take the White House".

At the start of the 2026 legislative session, after the United States captured his father and stepmother during strikes in Venezuela, Maduro Guerra demanded their return and characterized it as a threat to global security. He also pledged his loyalty to Vice President Delcy Rodríguez, who had assumed the acting presidency.

== Controversy ==
=== Nepotism ===
His father President Maduro and his wife Cilia Flores were accused of nepotism for allegedly placing family members in Venezuelan government positions. His appointment as Head of the Corps of Special Inspectors of the Presidency was criticized as an example of his family's alleged nepotism.

=== José Zalt wedding incident ===
External videos
- Maduro Guerra being showered with dollar bills at a wedding. on YouTube

At the wedding of José Zalt, a Syrian-Venezuelan businessman who owns the clothing brand Wintex, on 14 March 2015, Maduro Guerra was showered with American dollars at the gathering in the luxurious Gran Melia Hotel in Caracas. The incident caused outrage among Venezuelans who believed this to be hypocritical of President Maduro, especially since many Venezuelans were experiencing hardships due to the poor state of the economy and due to the president's public denouncements of capitalism. During a PSUV National Congress, Maduro Guerra dismissed the incident, calling it "gossip".

=== Photograph incident ===
External image
- The photograph of Maduro Guerra which resulted in the arrests of Morales and her husband

During a first communion party in the Creole Club of Maracaibo, a woman named Rita Morales used her cellphone to take photographs of Maduro Guerra. According to witnesses, Maduro arrived at the party surrounded by bodyguards and far from the rest of the guests. The bodyguards tried to take the mobile phone away from Morales and force her to delete the pictures after realizing that Maduro was photographed. Morales refused and left the party; days after the incident, she was visited by officers who, according to witnesses, broke her phone. On 8 June 2017, officers of the Bolivarian Intelligence Service (SEBIN) detained Morales and her husband when they were about to board a private flight to Aruba in the La Chinita International Airport. Morales was taken to the SEBIN headquarters in El Helicoide.

=== Sanctions ===
The United States sanctioned Maduro Guerra on 28 June 2019 for being a current or former official of the Government of Venezuela, as well as being a member of Venezuela's Constituent Assembly.

=== Alleged drug trafficking ===
Along with his father and stepmother Cilia Flores and other Venezuelan government officials, Maduro Guerra has been charged by the United States for alleged drug trafficking, which he denies.

== Personal life ==
Maduro Guerra is married and has two daughters. He is father to seven children.
