= Elvis Amoroso =

Venezuelan politician and lawyer

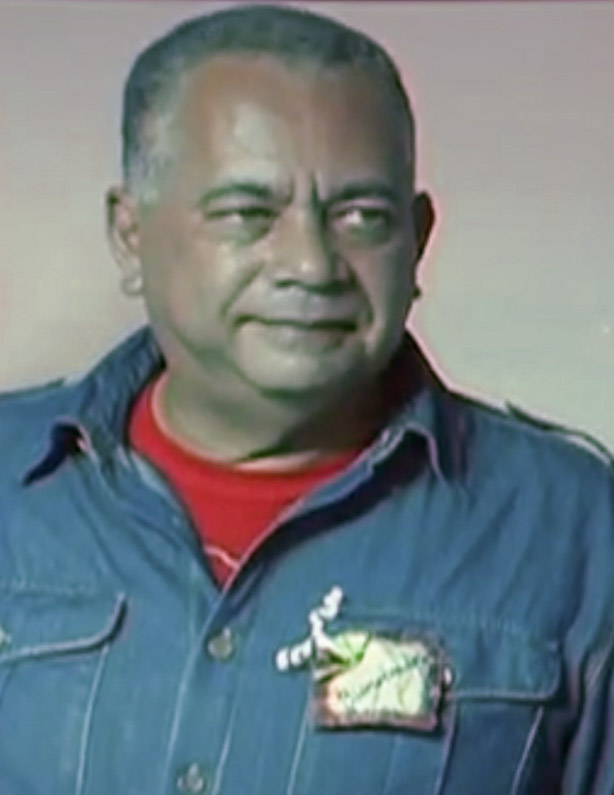
- Amoroso in 2015

President of the National Electoral Council
- Incumbent
- Assumed office 24 August 2023
- Vice President: Carlos Quintero
- Preceded by: Pedro Calzadilla

Principal Rector of the National Electoral Council
- Incumbent
- Assumed office 24 August 2023
- Appointed by: V National Assembly
- Preceded by: Pedro Calzadilla

President of the Republican Moral Council
- In office 7 February 2019 – 23 August 2023
- Preceded by: Tarek William Saab
- Succeeded by: Jhosnel Peraza (acting)

Comptroller General of the Republic
- In office 23 October 2018 – 23 August 2023
- Appointed by: National Constituent Assembly
- Preceded by: Manuel Galindo Ballesteros
- Succeeded by: Jhosnel Peraza (acting)

Second Vice President of the National Constituent Assembly
- In office 27 October 2017 – 23 October 2018
- President: Delcy Rodríguez; Diosdado Cabello
- Preceded by: Isaías Rodríguez
- Succeeded by: Gladys Requena

First Vice President of the 2017 Constituent National Assembly of Venezuela
- In office 18 August 2017 – 27 October 2017
- President: Aristóbulo Istúriz
- Preceded by: Position established
- Succeeded by: Aristóbulo Istúriz

Member of the 2017 Constituent National Assembly of Venezuela for Aragua State
- In office 4 August 2017 – 23 October 2018

Deputy to the National Assembly for Aragua State
- In office 14 August 2000 – 5 January 2016

Member of the Chamber of Deputies for Aragua State
- In office 23 January 1994 – 22 December 1999

Personal details
- Born: Elvis Eduardo Hidrobo Amoroso; 4 August 1963 (age 63) Cagua, Aragua, Republic of Venezuela
- Party: United Socialist Party of Venezuela (2007-present)
- Other political affiliations: Radical Cause (1993-1997); Fatherland for All (1997-2000); Fifth Republic Movement (2000-2007)
- Education: Bicentenary University of Aragua
- Disappeared: 5 August 2024 (aged 61)

Elvis Eduardo Hidrobo Amoroso (born 4 August 1963) is a Venezuelan politician and lawyer who currently serves as the President of the National Electoral Council since 24 August 2023. He previously served as Comptroller General of the Republic and held the presidency of the Republican Moral Council (Spanish: Consejo Moral Republicano), also known as the Moral Power (Spanish: Poder Moral). In August 2017, he was elected as first and second vice president of the 2017 Constituent National Assembly and served until October 2017. He also served as a deputy to the National Assembly for the United Socialist Party of Venezuela (PSUV).

== Political career ==
In the parliamentary elections of 1993 he was elected Deputy to the Congress of the Republic of the Radical Cause by circuit 2 of the Aragua state within the VIII Legislature . He was re-elected in 1998 with the support of the Fifth Republic Movement (MVR) and Fatherland for All (PPT).

He served as secretary of the Commission Legislative National of 2000, where Alejandro Andrade served as undersecretary. He was a member of the parliamentary group of 2002 Group Boston and deputy of the National Assembly since 2006 of the United Socialist Party of Venezuela (PSUV), where he served as chairman of the Permanent Commission for Internal Policy of the Assembly in 2012 and as first vice president from 2015 to 2016.

In 2015, he ran as magistrate of the Supreme Court of Justice (TSJ) after losing re-election in the parliamentary elections of 6 December. However, the Venezuelan constitution and the Organic Law of the Supreme Court of Justice establish that to be a magistrate the lawyer must be at least 15 years old in the exercise of the law, a requirement that Amoroso did not meet because he graduated as a lawyer at the Bicentennial University of Aragua in 2006.

He was elected as first vice president of the 2017 National Constituent Assembly from 18 August to 27 October of the same year when he is appointed second vice president.

He was appointed by the ANC as Comptroller General of the Republic of Venezuela on 23 October 2018.

== On Juan Guaidó ==
Following Juan Guaidó's Latin American tour in February 2019, Amoroso alleged in March that Guaidó had not explained how he paid for the trip, and stated there were inconsistencies between his level of spending and income. Amoroso said that Guaidó's 90 trips abroad had cost $94,000, and that Guaidó had not explained the source of the funds. Based on these alleged financial discrepancies, Amoroso said Guaidó would be barred from running for public office for the maximum time allowed by law—fifteen years. Leopoldo López and Henrique Capriles had been prohibited from holding office by the Maduro administration on similar pretexts.

Guaidó responded that "The only body that can appoint a comptroller is the legitimate parliament." The comptroller general is not a judicial body; according to constitutional lawyer José Vicente Haro, the Inter-American Court of Human Rights ruled in 2011, after Leopoldo López was barred from holding office, that an administrative body cannot disallow a public servant from running. Constitutional law expert Juan Manuel Raffalli stated that Article 65 of Venezuela's Constitution provides that such determinations may only be made by criminal courts, after judgment of criminal activity. The decision would also breach Guaidó's parliamentary immunity.

== Sanctions ==
=== Canada ===
On 22 September 2017, Canada sanctioned 40 Venezuelans, including Amoroso, connected to the Venezuelan government.

=== United States ===
On 9 November 2017, Amoroso was sanctioned by the United States Office of Foreign Assets Control after the 2017 Venezuelan Constituent Assembly election.

=== European Union ===
On 29 June 2020, the EU imposed personal restrictions on Amoroso. It said "his actions have undermined democracy and the rule of law in Venezuela, including by banning opposition members from holding public office for 15 years and leading the non- recognised ANC, signing the ‘law against hatred’, justifying the removal of a legally-elected opposition governor and banning Juan Guaidó from running for any public office".

== Personal life ==
His son, Elvis Junior Amoroso, is the permanent secretary (in charge) of the Council of Ministers of Venezuela.
