= Fatherland for All =

Political party in Venezuela

Fatherland for All Patria para Todos
- Leader: Rafael Uzcátegui
- Founded: 1997
- Split from: The Radical Cause
- Headquarters: Caracas, Venezuela
- Ideology: Libertarian socialism Egalitarianism; Internationalism
- Political position: Left-wing
- National affiliation: Popular Revolutionary Alternative (faction); Great Patriotic Pole (faction)
- Regional affiliation: São Paulo Forum
- Seats in the Latin American Parliament: 0 / 12
- Seats in the National Assembly: 8 / 277
- Governors of States of Venezuela: 0 / 23
- Mayors: 0 / 337

Website
- www.patriaparatodos.com.ve

Fatherland for All (Patria Para Todos, PPT) is a leftist political party in Venezuela. It was founded on September 27, 1997 by members of The Radical Cause party led by Pablo Medina, Aristóbulo Istúriz and Alí Rodríguez Araque. In 1998 the PPT supported the first presidential candidacy of Hugo Chávez. It is currently led by Rafael Uzcátegui.

== History ==
In the 2015 legislative elections held on 6 December, Fatherland for All backed the governmental electoral alliance Great Patriotic Pole (GPP). On this occasion, the party did not win any constituency representative out of 167 seats available at the unicameral National Assembly. Thus, it has no deputies of its own for the 2016–2021 term and is bound by law to renew its credentials with the National Electoral Council to keep functioning as a political party. In the previous 2010 legislative elections, Fatherland for All had won 2 out of 165 seats in the National Assembly.

In 2020, a fraction of the party requested the Supreme Tribunal of Justice (TSJ) to intervene the organization. The Constitutional Chamber responded in less than 24 hours to the request, dissolving the board of directors headed by Rafael Uzcátegui and replacing it with one headed by Medina. The PPT was the second intervened party that was part of the Great Patriotic Pole but broke away as a dissidence, the first being the Tupamaro party. It was also the fifth party to be intervened in total, the others being Democratic Action, Justice First and Popular Will.
