= Noelí Pocaterra =

Wayúu Venezuelan politician (born 1936)

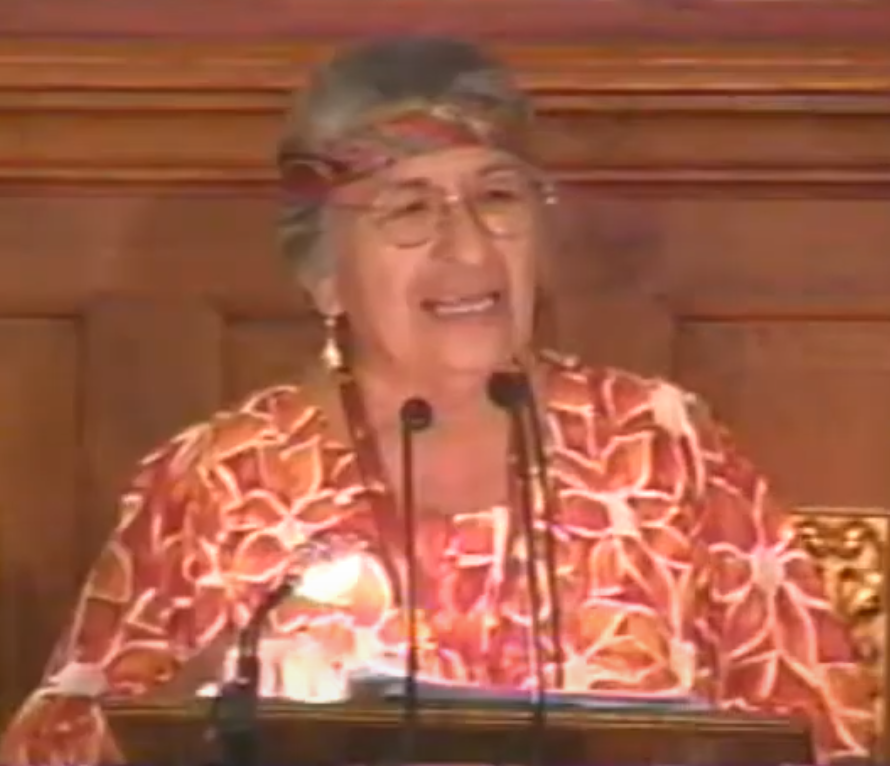
- Addressing the Constituent Assembly in 1999

Member of the Constituent Assembly
- In office 2017–2020

Member of the National Assembly
- In office August 2000 – 5 January 2011

Member of the Constituent Assembly
- In office 1999–2000

Personal details
- Born: Noelí Pocaterra Hernández; 18 September 1936 (age 90) Zulia, Venezuela
- Party: United Socialist
- Education: Central University of Venezuela
- Occupation: Activist, politician

Noelí Pocaterra Hernández (born 18 September 1936) is a Wayúu Venezuelan PSUV politician and indigenous rights activist, member of the National Assembly and member of the constituent assemblies of 1999 and 2017.

== Career ==
Noelí Pocaterra was born on 18 September 1936 in a Wayúu community in Zulia state. Her father, who was not indigenous, had to go into exile for ten years during the presidency of Marcos Pérez Jiménez and was imprisoned for forty-eight days in Bogotá on charges of conspiracy. As a child, Pocaterra and her brothers met Venezuelan president Rómulo Gallegos. She studied social work at the Central University of Venezuela when it was a technical school.

In 1979, Pocaterra presided over Venezuela's first national indigenous congress. She was one of few indigenous leaders appointed by President Hugo Chávez for the 1999 Constituent National Assembly, after being elected by the National Assembly of Indigenous Peoples. Pocaterra was also member of 2017 Constituent National Assembly, and of the Amazonian Parliament and the Indigenous Parliament of America.

Amid the Guyana-Venezuela crisis, in 2023 Pocaterra proposed incorporating recognition of the indigenous peoples of Guyana into the Organic Law for the Defense of Guyana Esequiba.
