= Iris Varela =

Venezuelan politician

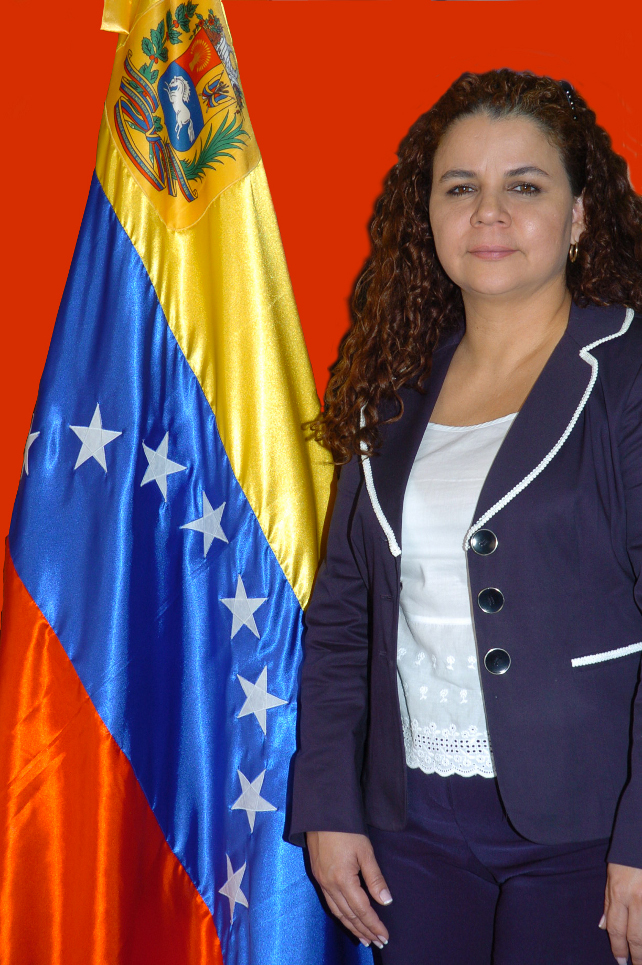
- Varela in 2011

First Vice President of the National Assembly of Venezuela
- In office 5 January 2021 – 5 January 2025
- Leader: Jorge Rodríguez
- Preceded by: Luis Parra

Deputy of the National Assembly of Venezuela for the National Constituency
- Incumbent
- Assumed office 5 January 2021

Minister of Popular Power for Penitentiary Service
- In office 4 January 2018 – 4 September 2019
- President: Nicolás Maduro
- Preceded by: Mirelys Contreras
- Succeeded by: Mirelys Contreras
- In office 26 July 2011 – 16 June 2017
- President: Hugo Chávez (2011–2013); Nicolás Maduro (2013–2017)
- Succeeded by: Mirelys Contreras

Deputy of the National Assembly of Venezuela for the State of Táchira
- In office 14 August 2000 – 26 July 2011

Member of the 2017 Constituent National Assembly of Venezuela
- In office 4 August 2017 – 18 December 2020

Member of the 1999 Constituent National Assembly of Venezuela
- In office 3 August 1999 – 31 January 2000

Personal details
- Born: María Iris Varela Rangel; 9 March 1969 (age 57) San Cristóbal, Táchira, Venezuela
- Party: Fifth Republic Movement (MVR); Revolutionary Bolivarian Movement-200 (MBR-200); Movement for Socialism (MAS); Independent Political Electoral Organization Committee (COPEI)
- Education: Catholic University of Tachira
- Occupation: Lawyer, politician, criminologist

María Iris Varela Rangel (born 9 March 1969 in San Cristóbal, Táchira, Venezuela) is a Venezuelan leftist politician, activist, criminologist, member of the board of the United Socialist Party of Venezuela (PSUV) and Minister of Popular Power for the Prison Service.

== Political life ==
Varela was a founding member of the Revolutionary Bolivarian Movement (Movimiento Bolivariano Revolucionario – 200). She served in the state of Táchira as a coordinator for Fifth Republic Movement, the party founded in 1997 to support the candidacy of former president Hugo Chávez.

On April 21, 2013, Varela was reaffirmed as Minister of Correctional Services for the Bolivaran Government of Venezuela for the government of Nicolás Maduro.

In 2016, Varela was appointed by Venezuelan president Nicolás Maduro to restructure PSUV in Táchira.

== National Assembly of Venezuela ==
Iris Varela was elected constituent to the Constituent Assembly in 1999, which was primarily aimed at drafting a new constitution, giving it a social character and including the vision of a participatory and protagonist democracy. Varela promoted the elimination of the Senate, which was adopted.

Thereafter, she was elected deputy to the National Assembly for Tachira state in three consecutive periods: 2000–2005, 2006–2011 and finally from 2011 to 2016.

As deputy to the National Assembly, she served as:

- Chairman of Regular Commission for the Study of Treaties, Agreements and Conventions Integration (Group of Three, CAN, Mercosur, CARICOM, NAFTA, EU, WTO) and FTAA
- Vice Chairman of the Standing Committee on Domestic Policy, Justice, Human Rights, and Constitutional Guarantees, where she promoted investigations of national importance, including researching conspiracies against the Republic; Extrajudicial State Guárico; the cases of Linda Loaiza and Danilo Anderson (Public Prosecutor); peasant executions, killings and paramilitary groups
- Coordinator of the Defense Committee of the Organic Act states of emergency
- Promoter of Public Defense Act
- Responsible for the Committee on Internal Policy Bill (National Police of Venezuela)
- Member of the Presidential Commission against the FTAA established by the President in 2002 who advised the National Executive
- Member of the Executive Committee of the Parliamentary Confederation of the Americas (COPA)
- Member of the Executive Committee of the Parliamentary Network of Women (Organ attached to COPA)
- Chairman of the Special Commission to investigate the murders of street people living in Caracas

In July 2011 she was designated Minister of People's Power for the Prison Service by the National Executive, separating from her parliamentary investiture within seven months of being sworn in as deputy for the current legislative period.

== Controversy ==
Varela was criticized for her use of profanity, and for her alleged relationship with the late Venezuelan criminal Teofilo Rodriguez Cazorla, better known as "El Conejo".

=== Sanctions ===
Varela has been sanctioned by several countries and is banned from entering neighboring Colombia. The Colombian government maintains a list of people banned from entering Colombia or subject to expulsion; as of January 2019, the list had 200 people with a "close relationship and support for the Nicolás Maduro regime".

On 26 July 2017, Varela was involved in targeted sanctions performed by the United States Department of the Treasury due to her involvement with the 2017 Venezuelan Constituent Assembly election, being a member of Venezuela's Presidential Commission for the Constituent Assembly.

Months later on 22 September 2017, Canada sanctioned Varela due to rupture of Venezuela's constitutional order.

On 29 March 2018, Varela was sanctioned by the Panamanian government for her alleged involvement with "money laundering, financing of terrorism and financing the proliferation of weapons of mass destruction".

=== Arrest of Juan Requesens ===
On August 12, in response to Venezuelans growing increasingly concerned with the economy of the nation, Iris Varela sent a tweet telling people that all they need to do is share with friends and that they should not speculate or doubt, otherwise "they will end up worse off than Requesens, [where] they aren't able to speculate". This tweet immediately became highly controversial, and was denounced as inhumane, for using the incarceration of Requesens as either a joke or a threat, especially by the woman in charge of his conditions in prison.

=== Threats against Juan Guaidó ===
After Juan Guaidó called for mass protests on 23 January 2019 against Nicolás Maduro and in favor of "an interim government." Varela threatened Guaidó, saying that she had picked out a prison cell for Guaidó and asked him to be quick in appointing his cabinet so she could prepare prison cells for them as well.

In April 2019, Varela called Guaidó "garbage" on Twitter, saying that he assumes the direction of "a criminal gang that grotesquely steals money from the Venezuelan people with the gringos." She also said that warm cell and many years in jail are waiting to pay "for his crimes."

=== February 2019 shipment of humanitarian aid ===
In February 2019, one day after the burning of several trucks with humanitarian aid managed by Juan Guaidó together with other countries, Varela was planted together with several armed civilians, on the Francisco de Paula Santander international bridge that communicates to Venezuela with Colombia.

According to the NGO Control Ciudadano, Varela's presence together with armed civilians represented a violation of Venezuelan laws, since she has no competence in public order or defense of the nation. The type of armament carried by Varela's companions was also in violation of the laws, since these were lethal weapons prohibited by the Organic Law of the Police Service and the National Police Corps, for the control of public order. In these cases, the law only allows the use of non-lethal weapons. Another irregularity detected by the NGO was that armed civilians were not identified as officials of state security forces, who are the only ones authorized to carry the type of weapons that Varela's companions had.
