= Earle Herrera =

Venezuelan journalist and politician (1949–2021)

Earle Herrera (23 April 1949 – 19 December 2021) was a Venezuelan journalist and politician.

== Career ==
He was elected to the 2017 Constituent National Assembly. On 4 September, Herrera, the president of a Constituency commission, resigned, alleging sectarianism during the election of the commission presidents, with which he did not agree.

Herrera died on 19 December 2021, at the age of 72.
