= 2017 Constituent National Assembly of Venezuela =

Venezuelan Constituent Assembly

Constituent National Assembly Asamblea Nacional Constituyente
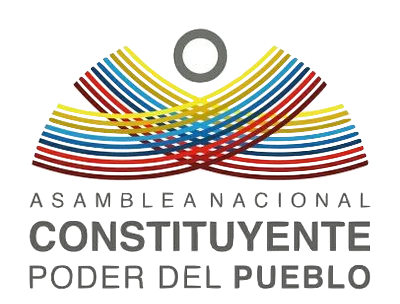

Type
- Houses: Constituent assembly

History
- Founded: 4 August 2017
- Disbanded: 31 December 2020
- Preceded by: 1999 Constituent Assembly

Leadership
- President: Diosdado Cabello, PSUV since 19 June 2018
- First Vice President: Tania Díaz, PSUV since 5 January 2018
- Second Vice President: Gladys Requena, PSUV since 23 October 2018
- Secretary: Fidel Vásquez, PSUV since 4 August 2017
- Undersecretary: Carolys Pérez, PSUV since 4 August 2017

Structure
- Seats: 545
- Political groups: Great Patriotic Pole (503); Vacancies (42)
- Length of term: 2 years, extendable (expires 31 December 2020)

Elections
- Voting system: List and nominal vote by municipal and sectoral
- Last election: 30 July 2017

Motto
- Power of the People (Poder del Pueblo) Constituent of the Sovereign People (Constituyente del Pueblo Soberano)

Meeting place
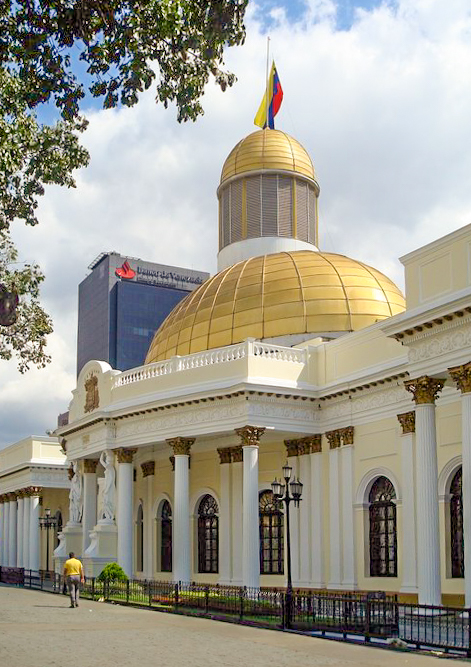
- Palacio Federal Legislativo, Caracas

The Constituent National Assembly (Spanish: Asamblea Nacional Constituyente; ANC) was a constituent assembly elected in 2017 to draft a new constitution for Venezuela. Its members were elected in a special 2017 election that was condemned by over forty mostly Latin American and Western states. The Democratic Unity Roundtable—the opposition to the incumbent ruling party—also boycotted the election claiming that the Constituent Assembly was "a trick to keep [the incumbent ruling party] in power." Since the opposition did not participate in the election, the incumbent Great Patriotic Pole, dominated by the United Socialist Party of Venezuela, won almost all seats in the assembly by default.

After the assembly was elected, the body convened for the first time on 4 August 2017, despite criticism from the aforementioned parties and from the regional trade bloc Mercosur. As part of it first acts, the assembly elected former Foreign Minister and Minister of Communication Delcy Rodríguez as its president, though she was appointed Vice President of Venezuela on 14 June 2018, and was succeeded by former vice president Diosdado Cabello.

On 8 August 2017, the Constituent Assembly declared itself to be the government branch with supreme power in Venezuela, banning the opposition-led National Assembly from performing actions that would interfere with the assembly while continuing to pass measures in "support and solidarity" with President Maduro. On 18 August 2017, the Constituent Assembly gave itself the power to pass legislation and override the National Assembly on issues concerning "preservation of peace, security, sovereignty, the socio-economic and financial system" and then stripped the National Assembly of its legislative powers the following day. The opposition-led National Assembly responded, stating it would not recognize the Constituent Assembly.

As of May 2019, the Constituent Assembly mandate was expected to expire on 31 December 2020. On 15 December 2020, President of the Assembly Diosdado Cabello set a dissolution date for three days later on 18 December, arguing that the assembly had met all of its objectives except for that of creating a new Constitution. On 18 December 2020, Maduro declared that the Constituent Assembly would close at the end of the year.

== Members ==
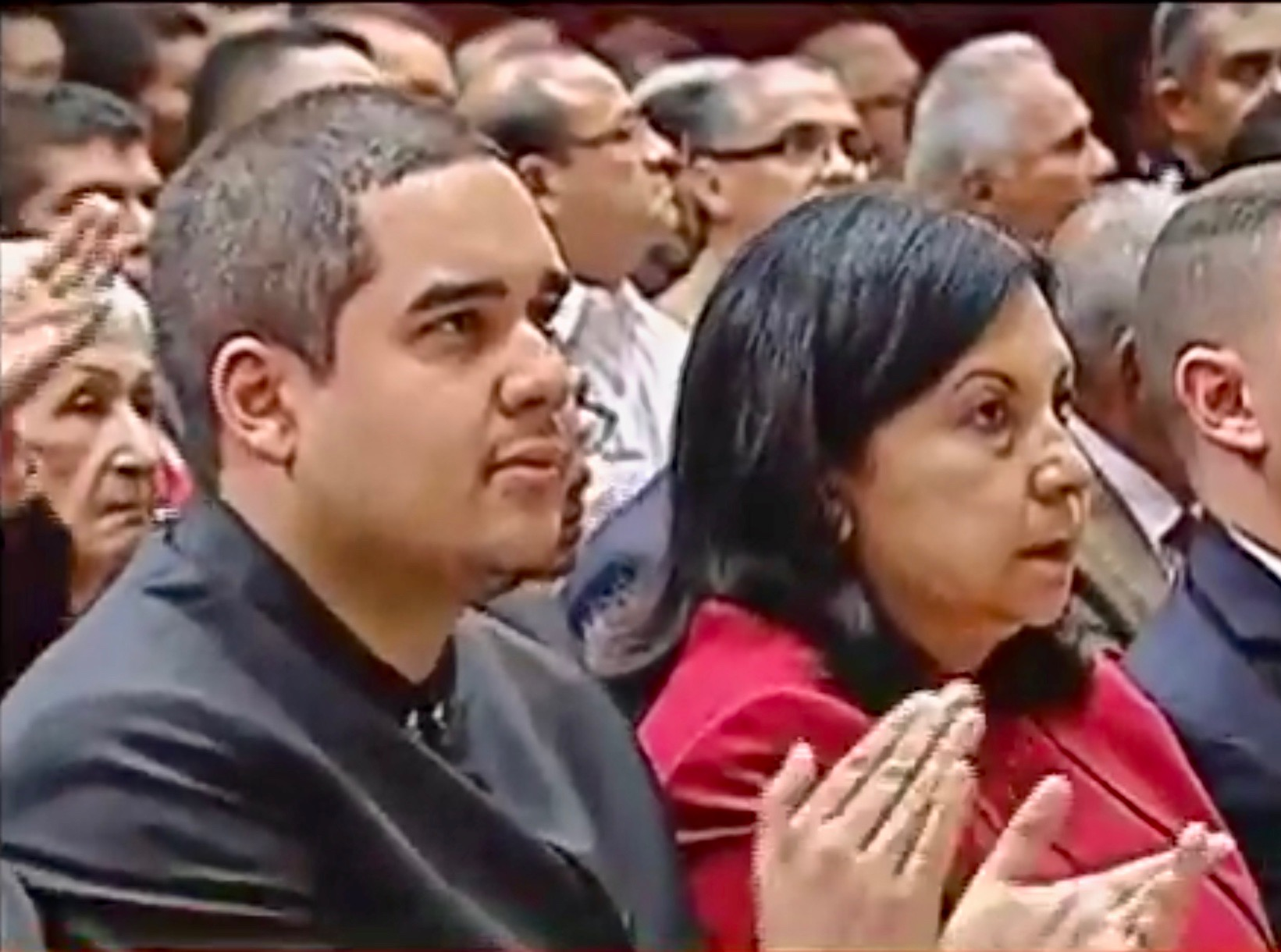
Nicolás Maduro Guerra, son of President Nicolás Maduro, beside Carmen Meléndez during a session

=== Presidential Commission ===
Member	Party	Previous position in Bolivarian Government
Elías Jaua	PSUV	Minister of Education
Diosdado Cabello	PSUV	Former President of the National Assembly (2012–16) and current deputy
Adán Chávez	PSUV	Minister of Culture
Isaías Rodríguez	PSUV	Venezuelan Ambassador to Italy
Aristóbulo Istúriz	PSUV	Minister of Communes and Social Movements
Hermann Escarrá	PSUV	Government Advisor and Constitutionalist Advocate
Earle Herrera	PSUV	National Assembly deputy
Iris Varela	PSUV	Minister of Venezuelan Penitentiary Service
Noelí Pocaterra	PSUV	Secretary of Indigenous Peoples and Communities of Zulia
Cilia Flores	PSUV	National Assembly deputy, First Lady of Venezuela
Delcy Rodríguez	PSUV	Minister of Foreign Affairs (2015–17)
Francisco Ameliach	PSUV	Governor of Carabobo (2012–17)

=== Others ===
Other members include:

- Nicolás Maduro Guerra – son of President Nicolás Maduro
- Carmen Meléndez – former Minister of Defense
- On 4 September 2017, Earle Herrera, the president of a Constituency commission, resigned, alleging sectarianism during the election of the commission presidents, which he did not agree with.

=== Presidents ===
N.º	President	Party	Term	First Vice President	Second Vice President
1	Delcy Rodríguez	Movement We Are Venezuela	4 August 2017 – 14 June 2018	Elvis Amoroso (2017); Aristóbulo Istúriz (2017–18); Tania Díaz (2018–31 December 2020)	Isaías Rodríguez (2017); Elvis Amoroso (2017–18)
2	Diosdado Cabello	United Socialist Party of Venezuela	14 June 2018 – 31 December 2020	Tania Díaz (2018–31 December 2020)	Gladys Requena (2018–31 December 2020)

== Actions ==
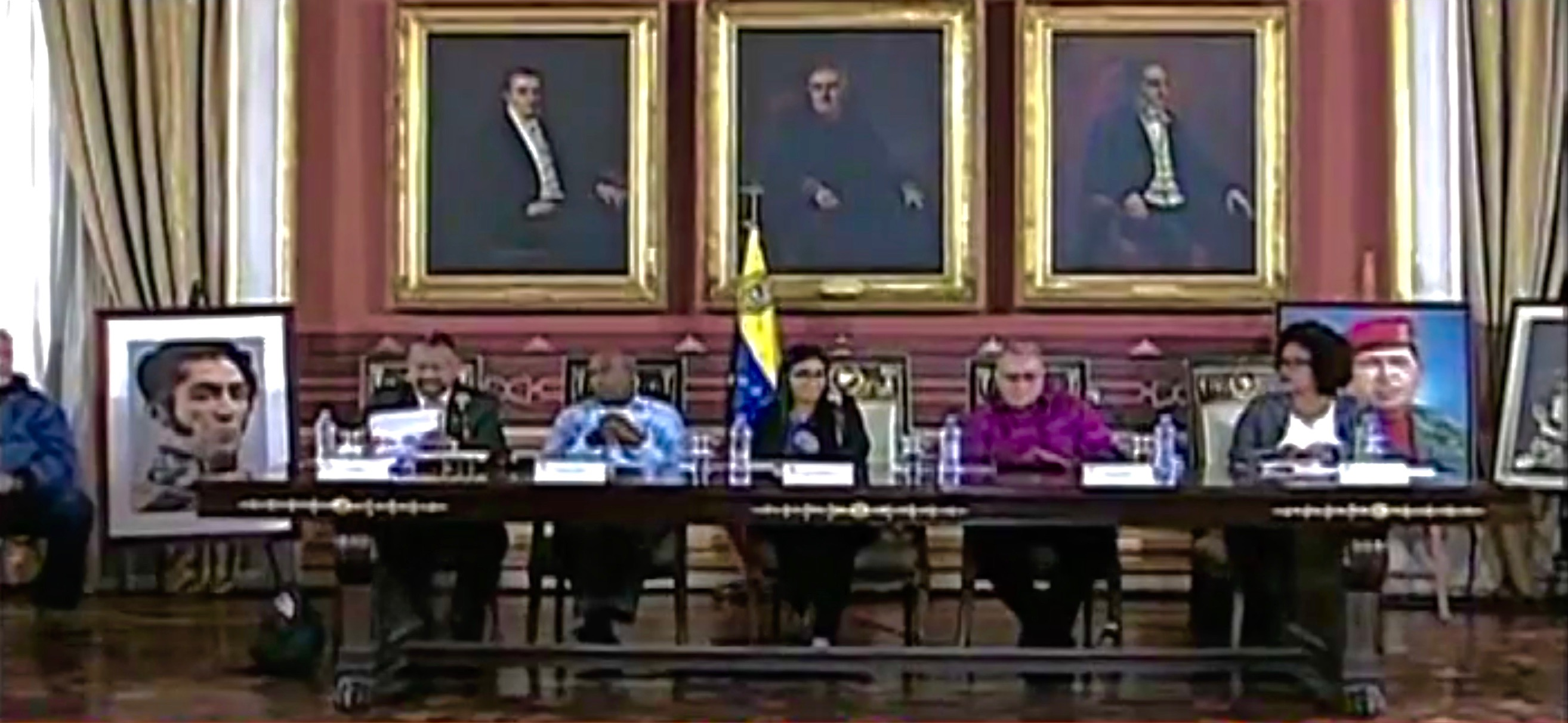
The Constituent Assembly's first meeting in the Salon Eliptico of the Federal Legislative Palace.

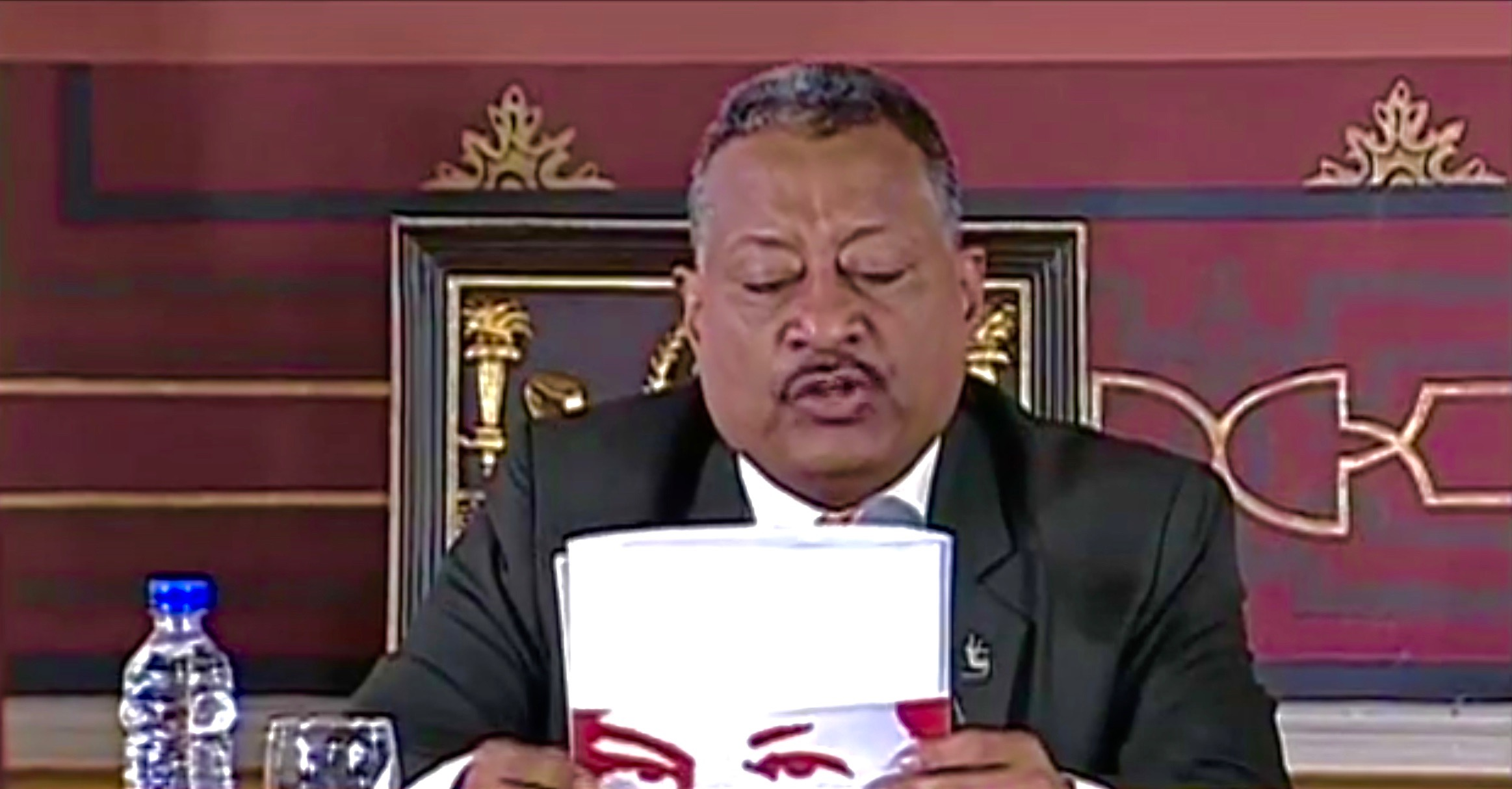
Fidel Vasquez reading from a folder with Chávez eyes during a Constituent Assembly session.

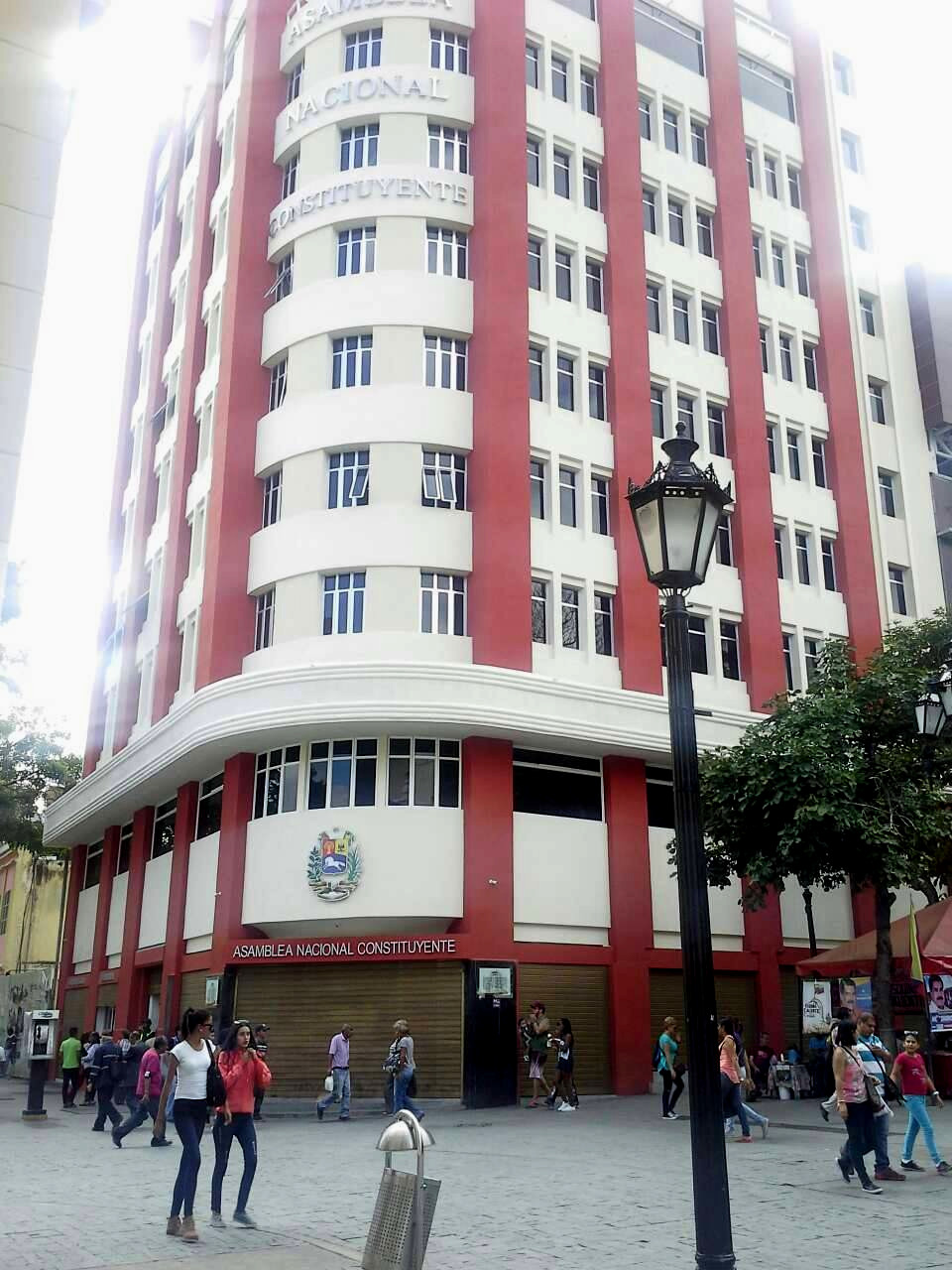
Edificio La Francia, administrative seat of the Constituent Assembly.

Prior to assembling at the Federal Legislative Palace, members of the National Constituent Assembly carried large portraits of Hugo Chávez and Simón Bolívar, placing them in the palace to show support for the Bolivarian government. Assembly President Delcy Rodríguez also declared that the new assembly would commence work on 5 August 2017.

=== Removal of government opposition ===
The Assembly voted on its first day of work to remove the nation's Chief Prosecutor Luisa Ortega Díaz and named Tarek William Saab as her replacement.

President Hugo Chávez told us that as long as imperialism existed, the Bolivarian Revolution would always be threatened, that is why we must achieve political hegemony, which is not a dictatorial hegemony, but to create awareness.

— Aristobulo Isturiz, Vice President of ANC

On 8 August 2017, the Constituent Assembly declared itself to be the government branch with supreme power in Venezuela, banning the opposition-led National Assembly from performing actions that would interfere with the assembly while continuing to pass measures in "support and solidarity" with President Maduro.

Tarek William Saab, the Chief Prosecutor appointed by the Constituent Assembly, announced on 16 August 2017 that former Chief Prosecutor Luisa Ortega Díaz and her husband, German Ferrer, operated an extortion group and a day later, the Constituent Assembly ordered for their arrest with the couple fleeing to Colombia. Ortega and Ferrer fled from Venezuela by speedboat to Aruba and flew into Colombia, with Ortega stating that the Bolivarian government would "deprive me of my life".

On 18 August 2017, the Assembly gave itself the power to pass legislation and override the National Assembly on issues concerning "preservation of peace, security, sovereignty, the socio-economic and financial system" and then stripped the National Assembly of its legislative powers the following day. The opposition-led National Assembly responded, stating it would not recognize the Constituent Assembly.

In an Al Jazeera interview with President of the Constituent Assembly Delcy Rodriguez, Rodriguez stated "I denied and continue denying that Venezuela has a humanitarian crisis", saying that it would justify international intervention in Venezuela. She also described statements by Venezuelans calling for international assistance as "treasonous".

On 11 October 2017, days before the Venezuela's regional elections, President Maduro stated that governors elected will only remain in power if they are subordinate to the ANC, telling voters that "everyone who votes ... recognizes the power of the Constituent National Assembly, because it is what convenes and organizes (the election)".

=== Truth, Justice and Reparations Commission ===
Law against Hatred, approved unanimously on 8 November 2017.

President Maduro announced on 6 August that the Assembly had created a Truth, Justice and Reparations Commission to investigate the protests, with Delcy Rodríguez presiding over the commission. The panel was set up on 16 August 2017. Rodríguez stated that opposition candidates of the October gubernatorial elections would be investigated to make sure they were not involved in violent protests.

About 268 people had been arrested as political prisoners by the Maduro government by December 2017, according to a non-governmental organisation. Delcy Rodríguez, head of the commission investigating the protests, announced the release of 80 prisoners around the time of Christmas.

=== 2018 presidential elections ===
The Constituent Assembly barred three of the most influential opposition parties – Justice First, Democratic Action and Popular Will; from participating in the 2018 Presidential Elections. It ruled that the parties who boycotted local elections in December 2017, had lost legitimacy, requiring them to reapply for legal status and potentially barring them from the presidential elections.

=== Stripping of Guaido's parliamentary immunity ===
The EU condemned the Constituent Assembly stripping of Juan Guaidó's parliamentary immunity, calling the action a "serious violation of the Venezuelan constitution, as well as of the rule of law and separation of power".

== Public opinion ==
A Hercon survey in August 2017 found that 78.7% of Venezuelans had a negative opinion of the ANC while 16.6% had positive thoughts about the assembly. A November 2017 poll by IVAD showed that the majority of Venezuelans did not recognize the Constituent National Assembly, with 61.4% of respondents agreeing with the phrase that the constitutional body was "illegal and illegitimate".

== Recognition ==
Map of countries who recognize ANC as of August 2017 Venezuela Approve Disapprove Neutral

Over 40 countries stated that they would not recognize the National Constituent Assembly. The European Union and the Holy See have also not recognized the legitimacy of the assembly. Following the establishment of the ANC, Argentina, Colombia, France, Peru, and the United States have characterized the Bolivarian Government of Venezuela as a dictatorship.

President Nicolás Maduro's allies – such as Bolivia, Cuba, China, El Salvador, Nicaragua, Russia and Syria – discouraged foreign intervention in Venezuelan politics and congratulated the president and recognized the results of the election.

== See also ==
- 1999 Constituent National Assembly
