= Fifth Republic Movement =

Venezuelan socialist political party (1997–2007)

Fifth Republic Movement Movimiento Quinta República
- Leader: Hugo Chávez
- Founded: 21 October 1997
- Dissolved: 20 October 2007
- Merged into: PSUV
- Headquarters: Plaza Venezuela, Caracas
- Ideology: Socialism of the 21st century Bolivarianism; Chavismo; Nationalism; Left-wing populism Third Way
- Political position: Left-wing to far-left
- International affiliation: São Paulo Forum

Website
- Official site

The Fifth Republic Movement (Spanish: Movimiento V [Quinta] República, MVR) was a socialist political party in Venezuela. It was founded in July 1997, following a national congress of the Revolutionary Bolivarian Movement-200, to support the candidacy of Hugo Chávez in the 1998 Venezuelan presidential election. The "Fifth Republic" refers to the fact that in 1997 the Republic of Venezuela was the fourth in Venezuelan history, and the Movement aimed to re-found the Republic through a constituent assembly. Following Chávez' 1998 election victory, this took place in 1999, leading to the 1999 Constitution of Venezuela.

At the 2000 Venezuelan parliamentary election, the party won 91 out of 165 seats in the National Assembly. On the same day, Chávez won the 2000 Venezuelan presidential election with 59.5% of the votes. In the 2005 Venezuelan parliamentary election, the party won 114 out of 167 seats, with allied parties winning the remaining seats. In December 2006 and January 2007, the party started its dissolution, to form the proposed United Socialist Party of Venezuela (PSUV). It merged into the PSUV on 20 October 2007.

== Foundation ==
The MVR was founded in July 1997 to support the electoral aims of the Revolutionary Bolivarian Movement-200. In the early years after his release, Chávez considered the possibility of another coup attempt, but with the prospects appearing slim, some advisers, notably Luis Miquilena, urged him to reconsider his scepticism of the elections. In July 1997, Chávez registered the new Fifth Republic Movement with the National Electoral Council.

== Aims ==
The party was committed to the Bolivarian Revolution and claimed to be the political voice of the country's poor. The MVR also pursued radical anti-Americanism and Marxism. Party leaders often had contacts with Fidel Castro and the Cuban Communist Party, for example. The MVR also promoted a stronger role for the military in political life, aligning with Hugo Chávez's vision of a "civil military union". This included efforts to integrate military officers into administrative positions and use forces in the implementation of programs. Regionally, the party endorsed a foreign policy centtered on Latin American integration, South South cooperations, and the creation of institutions that challenged U.S. influence.

== Migration ==
Regional migration became a significant consequence of the political and economic crisis that occurred while the Fifth Republic Movement (MVR) was active. Signs of out-migration began appearing in the early 2000s, but the trend intensified as Venezuela's institutions weakened and living conditions deteriorated, particularly after 2014, when falling oil prices triggered economic collapse. By 2017–2019, Venezuela experienced one of the Western hemisphere's greatest population movements of the early twenty-first century, as millions of citizens left the country.

Scholars argue that the root of this displacement was caused by political and economic transformations initiated under the Bolivarian Revolution, and out migration accelerated following Hugo Chávez's presidency. As a result, Venezuelan migration has become a defining feature of the country's crisis.

== Primary elections ==
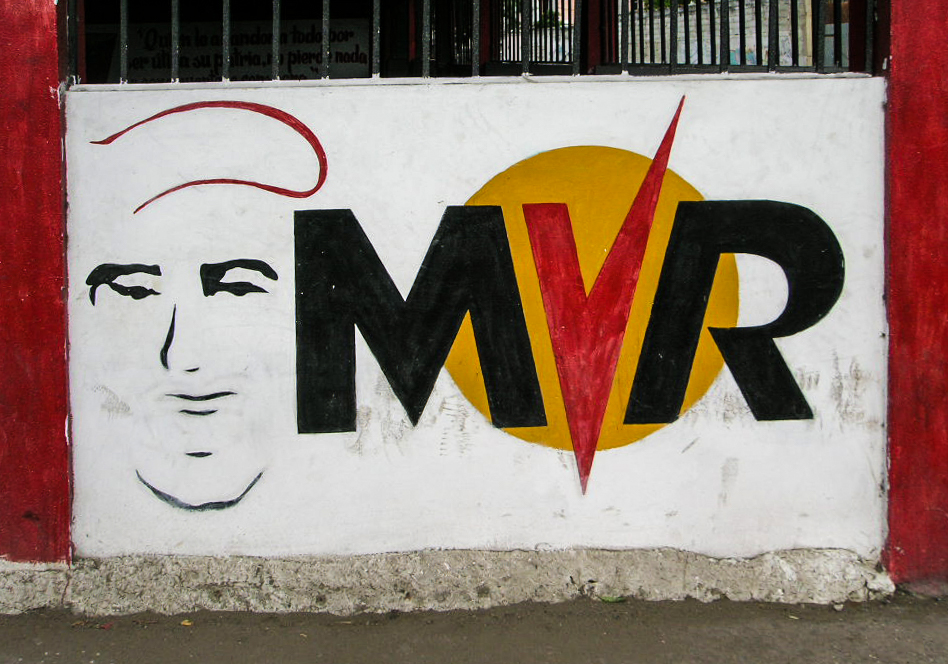
Mural of MVR logo

The Movement for a Fifth Republic (MVR), formerly Venezuela's governing party, was the first political party in Venezuela to incorporate primary elections as the primary method for selecting its candidates.

Led by Hugo Chávez, but involving organizations and movements that are broader than the MVR, the question of how to select MVR candidates had been controversial. Until the implementation of this primary mechanism, candidates tended to be hand-picked by the leadership of the parties. The result had been that a number of those elected on MVR platforms were distrusted by the masses, and in some cases proved to be disloyal.

The issue came to a head in the lead-up to the regional elections of October 2005. Despite opposition from within the grassroots movements, a candidate list was drawn up by the leadership of various MVR allied parties. The decision not to hold primaries was justified by the claim that there wasn't time. After the elections, Chavez stated that in the future, primaries would be held to empower the rank and file to select candidates.

Provisions introduced into the constitution and adopted by referendum in 1999 already mean that elected officials can have their mandate revoked half-way through their term if 20% of their electors sign a petition requesting a fresh election.

A total of 2.4 million people voted in the MVR primaries. More than 5200 candidates were pre-selected to compete for the 5618 positions up for grabs in the August elections. The remaining 418 positions will go to other pro-Chavez parties. However, other pro-Chavez groups have publicly criticized the MVR for taking these positions.

== Criticism and Controversies ==
The MVR and Hugo Chávez presidency faced criticism both domestically and internationally. Scholars such as Corrales (2020) argues that electoral irregularities, including manipulation of the timing of election and media access, weakened opposition parties while maintaining legitimacy. Critics claim that these practices contributed to a gradual erosion of democratic presence in Venezuela.

Internationally, Chávez's rhetoric and policies drew attention. In 2006, Jerry Falwell criticized a speech in which Chávez had referred to U.S. President George W. Bush as "the devil" and encouraged a boycott of Citgo, a Venezuelan owned company. Such statements made by Chávez heavily contributed to perceptions of Venezuela as confrontational globally. Domestically, opposition groups and analyst argued that the MVR concentrated power within the leadership circle, limited internal party democracy and promoted clientelism.

== Hugo Chávez ==
In 1998, Hugo Chávez was elected president of Venezuela. He represented himself as an advocate for the poor, which created a divide within social classes. Drawing power from his political party, Hugo Chávez controlled the majority of media outlets within Venezuela. Having so much control and power over the country, Chavez fought opposition and succeeded. Venezuela's economic decline began during the period of Chavez's Bolivarian Revolution, and continued under Nicolas Maduro.

== Nicolás Maduro ==
After Hugo Chávez's death, Nicolas Maduro was elected president of Venezuela. By now, the country depended on its oil revenues, and after Chavez's presidency and the Bolivarian Revolution, oil revenues began decreasing. The country's economy was not stable, and it became even more unstable after oil prices dropped worldwide in 2014. As a result of this, Maduro initiated a plan on printing more money in 2014, rising inflation levels.

== Post-Chavismo humanitarian crisis ==
The effects of Hugo Chávez and his Fifth Republic movement can be seen in Venezuela to this day. The country is undergoing a humanitarian crisis, due to its citizens lacking basic needs such as food and water. This crisis has driven many Venezuelans to emigrate to other Latin American countries such as Colombia and Brazil, causing a migratory crisis. These countries are lacking the resources to bear asylum for Venezuelan migrants.

== Periodization of Venezuelan history ==
Venezuela historiography recognizes four "republics," or major regime changes, since the country was founded in 1811. The First Republic, known as the "Venezuelan Confederation," lasted until 1812. The Second Republic is the restored republican regime that was instituted by Simón Bolívar after his Admirable Campaign in 1813, and which lasted until 1814. The Third Republic refers to the period after 1816 in which various patriot guerrilla bands joined under Bolívar's leadership in the Llanos of Venezuela and set up an independent government. This process culminated in the Congress of Angostura, but shortly thereafter the Congress declared Venezuela to be part of a larger Gran Colombia. Gran Colombia lasted only a decade and at its dissolution Venezuela became once again the "Republic of Venezuela," which is considered the start of the Fourth Republic. In 1864, the country was restructured as the "United States of Venezuela", before reverting once again to the name "Republic of Venezuela" in 1953. Although both periods began with the implementation of new constitutions (the fourth and twenty-fourth constitutions, respectively), both have been deemed by Venezuelan historiography as a continuation of the Fourth Republic. In 1999, the country officially renamed itself as the Bolivarian Republic of Venezuela.

Since Chávez's election to the Presidency in 1998, the country has been known as the "Bolivarian Republic of Venezuela", signaling Chávez' desires to usher in a new era of politics and government. This unique "Bolivarian" government is the "Fifth Republic" referred to in the party's title. The use of the phrase also echoes the French Fifth Republic, which was another sweeping political change to deal with political instability during decolonisation.

Chávez repeatedly framed the Bolivarian Revolution as a break from what he described as the political stagnation and corruption of the Fourth Republic. By promoting the idea of a "Fifth Republic", his movement emphasized the creation of new institutions. The 1999 Constitution was presented as the foundational document of this new republican era, making the beginning of what the MVR considered a phase in Venezuelan History.

== Dissolution ==
On 18 December 2006, Hugo Chávez announced plans to dissolve the party, hoping that the 23 other parties that supported his government would follow suit and collectively form the proposed United Socialist Party of Venezuela. According to Hetland(2017), the creation of the PSUV in 2007 was motivated by the need for a more cohesive organization to consolidate Chavista control. The PSUV quickly rose in power and became Venezuela's largest political party, incorporating MVR members and leaders. Scholars note that this merger marked the transition from a fragmented pro-government coalition to a system more centered on Chavismo.

Elections the MVR participated in:

- 1998 Venezuelan presidential election, 2000 Venezuelan presidential election, 2006 Venezuelan presidential election
- 1998 Venezuelan parliamentary election, 2000 Venezuelan parliamentary election, 2005 Venezuelan parliamentary election
- 1998 Venezuelan regional elections, 2000 Venezuelan regional elections, 2004 Venezuelan regional elections
- April 1999 Venezuelan constitutional referendum, December 1999 Venezuelan constitutional referendum, 2004 Venezuelan recall referendum

== Leaders of MVR ==
- Hugo Chávez
- Francisco Ameliach
- Juan Barreto
- Diosdado Cabello
- Jesse Chacón
- Cilia Flores
- Willian Lara
- Nicolás Maduro
- Tarek William Saab
- Luis Tascón
- Iris Varela
- Darío Vivas

== Election results ==
=== Presidential ===
Election year	Name	1st round		2nd round	
Election year	Name	# of overall votes	% of overall vote	# of overall votes	% of overall vote
1998	Hugo Chávez	3,673,685	56.2 (#1)		
2000	Hugo Chávez	3,757,773	59.8 (#1)		
2006	Hugo Chávez	7,309,080	62.8 (#1)		

=== Parliament (National Assembly) ===
Election year	# of overall votes	% of overall vote	# of overall seats won	+/–
1998	986,131	19.9 (#2)	35 / 207	▲35
2000	1,977,992	44.4 (#1)	91 / 165	▲56
2005	2,041,293	60.0 (#1)	116 / 167	▲25
