= Comisión para la Reforma del Estado =

The Comisión para la Reforma del Estado (COPRE – Commission for the Reform of the State) was a Presidential Commission created in 1984 by President Jaime Lusinchi to examine the reform of the Venezuelan state and political system. The 35-member commission included 18 independents, as well 9 members from Democratic Action and 5 from COPEI.

== History ==
From 1984 to 1987 its President was Ramón José Velásquez; upon his resignation he was replaced by Arnoldo José Gabaldón.

In May 1986 COPRE published "Proposals for Immediate Political Reform". These proposals included direct popular election of Venezuelan state governors and mayors, replacing the previous system of voters choosing a single party slate for all. The proposals also included "increased democratization of internal party procedures, and regulation of public and private financing of political parties". These reforms were considered too radical, with the governing Democratic Action publicly rejecting them; the reforms were defeated without even being discussed in Congress.

Only during the campaign for the 1988 Venezuelan general election did the political space for the reforms appear. COPEI's presidential candidate, Eduardo Fernández, promoted the idea of reform, forcing Democratic Action candidate Carlos Andrés Pérez to address the issue. This led to an agreement between the two parties, and in June 1988 direct election of mayors, a law on fiscal and administrative decentralization to local governments, and a change in the electoral system from closed list proportional representation (used since 1958) to a mixed system was agreed. Implementation of the new electoral system was postponed until the following elections (in the event, the 1993 Venezuelan general election used a different system agreed in the interim). Only with the loss of Democratic Action's absolute majority in Congress in the 1988 Congressional elections, and the popular unrest demonstrated in the early 1989 Caracazo, was the direct election of state governors approved.
