= 1998 Venezuelan parliamentary election =

Parliamentary elections were held in Venezuela on 8 November. Democratic Action won a plurality of seats, winning 61 of the 207 seats in the Chamber of Deputies and 21 of the 54 seats in the Senate. Voter turnout was 54.5% in the Senate elections and 52.7% in the Chamber elections.

People elected for the first time in this election include Nicolás Maduro and Juan Barreto (MVR), Henrique Capriles Radonski (COPEI) for the Chamber of Deputies; and Rafael Poleo (Democratic Action) and Julián Isaías Rodríguez Diaz (MVR) for the Senate.

== Results ==
=== Senate ===
Party	Votes	%	Seats
Democratic Action	1,235,473	24.36	19
Fifth Republic Movement	1,002,169	19.76	12
Copei	618,235	12.19	7
Project Venezuela	517,732	10.21	4
Movement for Socialism	464,308	9.15	5
Fatherland for All	167,646	3.31	1
Radical Cause	148,777	2.93	1
Opening for National Participation	122,422	2.41	1
National Convergence	119,632	2.36	2
Integration, Representation and New Hope	63,159	1.25	1
Renewal	61,704	1.22	1
Communist Party of Venezuela	24,889	0.49	0
Authentic Renewal Organization	24,690	0.49	0
Independent Solidarity	24,297	0.48	0
United for Human Rights	21,548	0.42	0
Organisation Force in Motion	21,424	0.42	0
National Integration Movement	19,074	0.38	0
Democratic Republican Union	16,778	0.33	0
People's Electoral Movement	15,012	0.30	0
PROCA	13,498	0.27	0
Movement for Popular Democracy–Red Flag Party	13,295	0.26	0
RENACE	12,078	0.24	0
Emerging People	9,221	0.18	0
OFI	8,841	0.17	0
OPINA	7,650	0.15	0
IPV	7,351	0.14	0
PQAC	7,239	0.14	0
FRENTE	7,056	0.14	0
Independents for the National Community	7,000	0.14	0
FS	6,883	0.14	0
OCIM	6,859	0.14	0
DR	6,487	0.13	0
MR	5,653	0.11	0
MERI	5,447	0.11	0
MOS	5,183	0.10	0
ROGE	5,064	0.10	0
TM	4,803	0.09	0
FTA	4,488	0.09	0
SOLUCION	4,476	0.09	0
AP	4,434	0.09	0
FP	4,293	0.08	0
MANA	3,960	0.08	0
GAS	3,099	0.06	0
CON	3,092	0.06	0
LAGO	2,981	0.06	0
FD	2,942	0.06	0
AST	2,777	0.05	0
FEC	2,683	0.05	0
AA	2,545	0.05	0
FIOPP	2,534	0.05	0
ICC	2,534	0.05	0
PLV	2,377	0.05	0
GRUA	2,312	0.05	0
MONCHO	2,307	0.05	0
ONDA	2,170	0.04	0
ONI	2,136	0.04	0
PARTICIPA	2,005	0.04	0
CON LA VIDA	1,958	0.04	0
ASIO	1,936	0.04	0
LPJ	1,838	0.04	0
F1	1,773	0.03	0
DE CHACAO 92	1,741	0.03	0
MRV	1,714	0.03	0
SC 95	1,714	0.03	0
DIYA	1,616	0.03	0
MBPZ	1,540	0.03	0
CORCINO	1,537	0.03	0
FM	1,502	0.03	0
MOV 8 NOV	1,490	0.03	0
FT	1,461	0.03	0
MAR	1,461	0.03	0
CUMANAGOTOS	1,456	0.03	0
PA	1,450	0.03	0
AR	1,393	0.03	0
PRIZ	1,325	0.03	0
VEAL	1,321	0.03	0
FZ	1,319	0.03	0
PMO	1,301	0.03	0
BREA	1,295	0.03	0
IPAZ	1,289	0.03	0
PDI	1,287	0.03	0
JCPO	1,264	0.02	0
VU	1,263	0.02	0
AVANCE SOCIAL	1,260	0.02	0
GEM	1,246	0.02	0
PROMER	1,203	0.02	0
MPDIN	1,145	0.02	0
VIENE	1,116	0.02	0
UPID	1,111	0.02	0
PADEPO	1,088	0.02	0
RND	1,028	0.02	0
PTP	1,015	0.02	0
IAP	973	0.02	0
LAC	973	0.02	0
PVM	953	0.02	0
EL	952	0.02	0
CRA	895	0.02	0
RC	888	0.02	0
MPI	883	0.02	0
United Multi-Ethnic Peoples of Amazonas	863	0.02	0
MOV 20	862	0.02	0
MIO	861	0.02	0
PRM	854	0.02	0
MRN	841	0.02	0
MNBD	839	0.02	0
FALCONIA	838	0.02	0
UNIDOS	799	0.02	0
MIG	796	0.02	0
POPA	777	0.02	0
LA CHISPA	733	0.01	0
CS	708	0.01	0
SOL	683	0.01	0
MC	675	0.01	0
PG	640	0.01	0
NRD	622	0.01	0
PPI	615	0.01	0
FUDO	606	0.01	0
PN	604	0.01	0
GIRASOL	603	0.01	0
TUYO	566	0.01	0
AINCO	564	0.01	0
CD	563	0.01	0
DIA	539	0.01	0
PGI	526	0.01	0
VMTPI	524	0.01	0
MADRE TIERRA	517	0.01	0
POR MIRANDA	505	0.01	0
ACTIVE	502	0.01	0
IA	499	0.01	0
VOI	492	0.01	0
CRECE	482	0.01	0
MIRE	479	0.01	0
PSDTC	477	0.01	0
ASI	475	0.01	0
COFRANE	468	0.01	0
UVI	454	0.01	0
PC	453	0.01	0
VIRA	451	0.01	0
UPLP	449	0.01	0
GP	443	0.01	0
MUN	429	0.01	0
MDC	428	0.01	0
MIAU	420	0.01	0
PV	409	0.01	0
PAL 2003	408	0.01	0
G-2000	396	0.01	0
GIRA	389	0.01	0
CCC	388	0.01	0
EPA	385	0.01	0
MIPREA	381	0.01	0
CI	380	0.01	0
MICO	377	0.01	0
USTED	375	0.01	0
O 98	374	0.01	0
GUAIQUERI	373	0.01	0
IPP	369	0.01	0
MIPAO	366	0.01	0
MIL	364	0.01	0
PANA	364	0.01	0
RA	361	0.01	0
CCN	349	0.01	0
VE	347	0.01	0
DECISION F	345	0.01	0
QUEDE	344	0.01	0
ART	338	0.01	0
CHACAO EMERGENTE	336	0.01	0
ANDI	333	0.01	0
PARA	331	0.01	0
FCC	330	0.01	0
FRD	325	0.01	0
CONCENSO	320	0.01	0
PPC	317	0.01	0
FAI	316	0.01	0
AV 98	312	0.01	0
GD	303	0.01	0
VINE	302	0.01	0
VIDA	293	0.01	0
PIV	289	0.01	0
INCVF	288	0.01	0
MLI	286	0.01	0
DEPURACION	284	0.01	0
OI	282	0.01	0
MISP	279	0.01	0
PUNTO	278	0.01	0
MIVO	277	0.01	0
M 100	275	0.01	0
ALVE	268	0.01	0
EN	268	0.01	0
PRI	266	0.01	0
IC	263	0.01	0
OTI	262	0.01	0
AM	260	0.01	0
PP	260	0.01	0
FURE 2003	258	0.01	0
VM	257	0.01	0
PUP	247	0.00	0
MIVE	244	0.00	0
PPA	239	0.00	0
PCMI	236	0.00	0
MIRA	234	0.00	0
MFU	233	0.00	0
MIC	231	0.00	0
MONAP	229	0.00	0
ARDE	219	0.00	0
CIMA	219	0.00	0
UPA	219	0.00	0
DCG	217	0.00	0
UNEI	216	0.00	0
FND	212	0.00	0
DIME	211	0.00	0
PADE	210	0.00	0
ACI	209	0.00	0
UP	205	0.00	0
TUY SIGLO XXI	204	0.00	0
CID	202	0.00	0
MOTIVO	199	0.00	0
OPIC	195	0.00	0
REALCI	195	0.00	0
SIR	193	0.00	0
SIL	192	0.00	0
GENTE-MIRANDA	187	0.00	0
REUNE	187	0.00	0
EL BARRIO	185	0.00	0
MIRAM	184	0.00	0
DIHA	182	0.00	0
PALO	182	0.00	0
DICE	178	0.00	0
GDB	177	0.00	0
MDNO	172	0.00	0
CM	171	0.00	0
LA LLAVE	165	0.00	0
MOVEDEIN	165	0.00	0
A TODO TREN	163	0.00	0
LIDER	161	0.00	0
EL FARO	160	0.00	0
UNE	149	0.00	0
MDR	145	0.00	0
PFP	145	0.00	0
TN 2000	145	0.00	0
CEFIGAR	144	0.00	0
FURC 46	143	0.00	0
FIN	139	0.00	0
PRO 21	131	0.00	0
CER	128	0.00	0
LD	128	0.00	0
ORIDEG	127	0.00	0
ORINOCO	127	0.00	0
MUI	122	0.00	0
CFPI	121	0.00	0
MRG 2000	121	0.00	0
MORI	120	0.00	0
II	118	0.00	0
MIIO	117	0.00	0
VERDAD	117	0.00	0
FRN	110	0.00	0
AC	109	0.00	0
NFG	105	0.00	0
PAN	102	0.00	0
MIYA	99	0.00	0
EIY	98	0.00	0
ESPARTANO	98	0.00	0
MR 2000	93	0.00	0
MOIR	87	0.00	0
MIPV	85	0.00	0
IDEY	81	0.00	0
FPC	72	0.00	0
FUCI	65	0.00	0
SDE	61	0.00	0
FIODE	57	0.00	0
MIR	56	0.00	0
MIIDEA	51	0.00	0
BES	49	0.00	0
DFE	46	0.00	0
NGD	39	0.00	0
MUPI	33	0.00	0
MEAI	29	0.00	0
Others	71,867	1.42	0
Total	5,072,127	100.00	54
Valid votes	5,072,127	86.56	
Invalid/blank votes	787,313	13.44	
Total votes	5,859,440	100.00	
Registered voters/turnout	10,991,482	53.31	
Source: CNE, CNE

=== Chamber of Deputies ===
Party	Votes	%	Seats			
Party	Votes	%	Party-list	Constituency	Compensatory	Total
Democratic Action	1,185,683	24.05	28	34	0	62
Fifth Republic Movement	980,259	19.88	21	25	0	46
Copei	591,639	12.00	17	11	0	28
Project Venezuela	517,070	10.49	14	6	0	20
Movement for Socialism	438,878	8.90	11	6	0	17
Fatherland for All	167,763	3.40	2	4	1	7
Radical Cause	143,919	2.92	5	0	1	6
National Convergence	121,951	2.47	0	2	2	4
Opening for National Participation	76,391	1.55	1	0	2	3
Integration, Representation and New Hope	62,525	1.27	0	0	2	2
Renewal	61,514	1.25	0	0	2	2
United for Human Rights	30,751	0.62	0	0	1	1
Authentic Renewal Organization	29,355	0.60	0	0	1	1
Communist Party of Venezuela	28,391	0.58	0	0	1	1
Independent Solidarity	24,664	0.50	0	0	1	1
Organisation Force in Motion	20,673	0.42	2	0	0	2
Democratic Republican Union	19,022	0.39	0	0	1	1
National Integration Movement	18,027	0.37	0	0	1	1
People's Electoral Movement	17,218	0.35	0	0	1	1
Movement for Popular Democracy–Red Flag Party	15,224	0.31	0	0	1	1
RENECE	13,812	0.28	0	0	0	0
PROCA	12,644	0.26	0	0	0	0
Emerging People	9,903	0.20	0	0	0	0
PQAC	8,220	0.17	0	0	0	0
IPV	7,900	0.16	0	0	0	0
Independents for the National Community	7,776	0.16	0	0	0	0
OFI	7,578	0.15	0	0	0	0
DR	7,062	0.14	0	0	0	0
FS	6,652	0.13	0	0	0	0
MR	6,541	0.13	0	0	0	0
OCIM	6,111	0.12	0	0	0	0
LR	5,597	0.11	0	0	0	0
AA	5,589	0.11	0	0	0	0
ROGE	5,427	0.11	0	0	0	0
MOS	5,280	0.11	0	0	0	0
MERI	5,159	0.10	0	0	0	0
OPINA	5,045	0.10	0	0	0	0
FRENTE	4,941	0.10	0	0	0	0
SOLUCION	4,910	0.10	0	0	0	0
AP	4,649	0.09	0	0	0	0
TM	4,630	0.09	0	0	0	0
FP	4,599	0.09	0	0	0	0
FTA	4,455	0.09	0	0	0	0
MANA	4,055	0.08	0	0	0	0
ICC	4,054	0.08	0	0	0	0
FD	3,954	0.08	0	0	0	0
FSP	3,564	0.07	0	0	0	0
LAGO	3,531	0.07	0	0	0	0
MIGATO	3,388	0.07	0	0	0	0
ONI	3,322	0.07	0	0	0	0
GAS	3,186	0.06	0	0	0	0
CON	2,928	0.06	0	0	0	0
PARTICIPA	2,912	0.06	0	0	0	0
AST	2,875	0.06	0	0	0	0
FEC	2,810	0.06	0	0	0	0
FIOPP	2,558	0.05	0	0	0	0
VU	2,486	0.05	0	0	0	0
PLV	2,468	0.05	0	0	0	0
MONCHO	2,441	0.05	0	0	0	0
GRUA	2,392	0.05	0	0	0	0
ONDA	2,202	0.04	0	0	0	0
ASIO	2,058	0.04	0	0	0	0
AR	2,026	0.04	0	0	0	0
MOV8NOV	1,962	0.04	0	0	0	0
LPJ	1,939	0.04	0	0	0	0
CON LA VIDA	1,851	0.04	0	0	0	0
DIYA	1,775	0.04	0	0	0	0
PA	1,745	0.04	0	0	0	0
SC 95	1,737	0.04	0	0	0	0
DE CHACAO 92	1,718	0.03	0	0	0	0
MRV	1,717	0.03	0	0	0	0
MBPZ	1,610	0.03	0	0	0	0
BREA	1,575	0.03	0	0	0	0
FT	1,575	0.03	0	0	0	0
VEAL	1,571	0.03	0	0	0	0
MIL	1,562	0.03	0	0	0	0
PRIZ	1,531	0.03	0	0	0	0
MAR	1,461	0.03	0	0	0	0
CORCINO	1,394	0.03	0	0	0	0
CUMANAGOTOS	1,389	0.03	0	0	0	0
F1	1,388	0.03	0	0	0	0
PROMER	1,357	0.03	0	0	0	0
PMO	1,351	0.03	0	0	0	0
IPAZ	1,348	0.03	0	0	0	0
PDI	1,324	0.03	0	0	0	0
GEM	1,309	0.03	0	0	0	0
AVANCE SOCIAL	1,300	0.03	0	0	0	0
FZ	1,256	0.03	0	0	0	0
JCPO	1,218	0.02	0	0	0	0
UPID	1,177	0.02	0	0	0	0
AMOR	1,170	0.02	0	0	0	0
EL	1,151	0.02	0	0	0	0
FALCONIA	1,150	0.02	0	0	0	0
MPDIN	1,125	0.02	0	0	0	0
MIRA	1,123	0.02	0	0	0	0
VIENE	1,123	0.02	0	0	0	0
LAC	1,086	0.02	0	0	0	0
FM	1,070	0.02	0	0	0	0
PADEPO	1,028	0.02	0	0	0	0
MC	1,017	0.02	0	0	0	0
MNBD	1,016	0.02	0	0	0	0
RC	1,000	0.02	0	0	0	0
PVM	988	0.02	0	0	0	0
MIO	985	0.02	0	0	0	0
MIG	967	0.02	0	0	0	0
IAP	944	0.02	0	0	0	0
PUAMA	931	0.02	0	0	0	0
MPI	922	0.02	0	0	0	0
MOINPA	920	0.02	0	0	0	0
INCVF	908	0.02	0	0	0	0
PN	908	0.02	0	0	0	0
PTP	895	0.02	0	0	0	0
UNIDOS	879	0.02	0	0	0	0
RND	853	0.02	0	0	0	0
PPI	831	0.02	0	0	0	0
CRA	830	0.02	0	0	0	0
MOV20	828	0.02	0	0	0	0
MRN	827	0.02	0	0	0	0
PG	821	0.02	0	0	0	0
AINCO	816	0.02	0	0	0	0
VEN	813	0.02	0	0	0	0
DIA	799	0.02	0	0	0	0
DI	796	0.02	0	0	0	0
CS	780	0.02	0	0	0	0
NRD	735	0.01	0	0	0	0
LA CHISPA	718	0.01	0	0	0	0
VMTPI	716	0.01	0	0	0	0
SOL	707	0.01	0	0	0	0
GRESANDI	659	0.01	0	0	0	0
GENTE-MIRANDA	656	0.01	0	0	0	0
UVI	632	0.01	0	0	0	0
POPA	617	0.01	0	0	0	0
EL TRIUNFO	616	0.01	0	0	0	0
POP	611	0.01	0	0	0	0
PRM	611	0.01	0	0	0	0
TUYO	599	0.01	0	0	0	0
FUDO	590	0.01	0	0	0	0
GIRASOL	587	0.01	0	0	0	0
PV	563	0.01	0	0	0	0
ACTIVE	562	0.01	0	0	0	0
IA	545	0.01	0	0	0	0
BIEM	539	0.01	0	0	0	0
PSDTC	534	0.01	0	0	0	0
ASI	520	0.01	0	0	0	0
PGI	506	0.01	0	0	0	0
G-2000	500	0.01	0	0	0	0
MADRE TIERRA	493	0.01	0	0	0	0
VOI	489	0.01	0	0	0	0
CD	488	0.01	0	0	0	0
PI	487	0.01	0	0	0	0
VIRA	477	0.01	0	0	0	0
COFRANE	475	0.01	0	0	0	0
CRECE	468	0.01	0	0	0	0
POR MIRANDA	468	0.01	0	0	0	0
PAL 2003	467	0.01	0	0	0	0
MIRE	463	0.01	0	0	0	0
GUAIQUERI	458	0.01	0	0	0	0
MIPREA	456	0.01	0	0	0	0
UPLP	450	0.01	0	0	0	0
USTED	449	0.01	0	0	0	0
MDC	448	0.01	0	0	0	0
PC	448	0.01	0	0	0	0
MIAU	442	0.01	0	0	0	0
O 98	430	0.01	0	0	0	0
GP	429	0.01	0	0	0	0
ANDI	420	0.01	0	0	0	0
MUN	405	0.01	0	0	0	0
VE	405	0.01	0	0	0	0
CONCENSO	403	0.01	0	0	0	0
PPC	399	0.01	0	0	0	0
CCC	393	0.01	0	0	0	0
MIPAO	386	0.01	0	0	0	0
CI	385	0.01	0	0	0	0
GIRA	384	0.01	0	0	0	0
EPA	382	0.01	0	0	0	0
PARA	378	0.01	0	0	0	0
CCN	377	0.01	0	0	0	0
MHM	375	0.01	0	0	0	0
RA	358	0.01	0	0	0	0
IPP	356	0.01	0	0	0	0
PANA	356	0.01	0	0	0	0
MICO	353	0.01	0	0	0	0
AV 98	348	0.01	0	0	0	0
QUEDE	348	0.01	0	0	0	0
PP	346	0.01	0	0	0	0
FCC	339	0.01	0	0	0	0
CHACAO EMERGENTE	334	0.01	0	0	0	0
GENACVEN	332	0.01	0	0	0	0
FAI	327	0.01	0	0	0	0
VINE	327	0.01	0	0	0	0
DECISION F	317	0.01	0	0	0	0
MIVO	317	0.01	0	0	0	0
ANPRI	314	0.01	0	0	0	0
OI	305	0.01	0	0	0	0
MLI	301	0.01	0	0	0	0
ART	295	0.01	0	0	0	0
UPE	293	0.01	0	0	0	0
VIDA	291	0.01	0	0	0	0
EN	290	0.01	0	0	0	0
IC	286	0.01	0	0	0	0
M 100	285	0.01	0	0	0	0
AM	283	0.01	0	0	0	0
FRD	276	0.01	0	0	0	0
PCMI	274	0.01	0	0	0	0
MFU	270	0.01	0	0	0	0
LA LLAVE	269	0.01	0	0	0	0
GD	267	0.01	0	0	0	0
PUNTO	267	0.01	0	0	0	0
ALVE	265	0.01	0	0	0	0
UNEI	265	0.01	0	0	0	0
ACI	263	0.01	0	0	0	0
LAPIS	261	0.01	0	0	0	0
DEPURACION	260	0.01	0	0	0	0
FURE 2003	258	0.01	0	0	0	0
MC 90	257	0.01	0	0	0	0
PRI	257	0.01	0	0	0	0
VM	254	0.01	0	0	0	0
MIC	252	0.01	0	0	0	0
OTI	245	0.00	0	0	0	0
MIVE	243	0.00	0	0	0	0
PPA	240	0.00	0	0	0	0
DIME	232	0.00	0	0	0	0
DCG	226	0.00	0	0	0	0
TUY SIGLO XXI	225	0.00	0	0	0	0
A TODO TREN	217	0.00	0	0	0	0
GDB	216	0.00	0	0	0	0
DIHA	215	0.00	0	0	0	0
UPA	215	0.00	0	0	0	0
ARDE	211	0.00	0	0	0	0
OPIC	210	0.00	0	0	0	0
REALCI	209	0.00	0	0	0	0
EL BARRIO	208	0.00	0	0	0	0
PADE	206	0.00	0	0	0	0
FND	203	0.00	0	0	0	0
PALO	203	0.00	0	0	0	0
SIR	199	0.00	0	0	0	0
CER	193	0.00	0	0	0	0
CIMA	179	0.00	0	0	0	0
CID	176	0.00	0	0	0	0
SIL	175	0.00	0	0	0	0
MIRAM	174	0.00	0	0	0	0
MORI	173	0.00	0	0	0	0
MOVEDEIN	173	0.00	0	0	0	0
REUNE	173	0.00	0	0	0	0
CM	171	0.00	0	0	0	0
DICE	170	0.00	0	0	0	0
UNE	166	0.00	0	0	0	0
MDNO	159	0.00	0	0	0	0
PFP	156	0.00	0	0	0	0
MDR	152	0.00	0	0	0	0
ORIDEG	148	0.00	0	0	0	0
FURC-46	147	0.00	0	0	0	0
FIN	145	0.00	0	0	0	0
API	143	0.00	0	0	0	0
EL FARO	142	0.00	0	0	0	0
ORINOCO	139	0.00	0	0	0	0
PRO 21	138	0.00	0	0	0	0
LD	134	0.00	0	0	0	0
MRG 2000	132	0.00	0	0	0	0
MIPV	131	0.00	0	0	0	0
VERDAD	121	0.00	0	0	0	0
EIY	114	0.00	0	0	0	0
II	114	0.00	0	0	0	0
LIDER	113	0.00	0	0	0	0
AC	112	0.00	0	0	0	0
PAN	110	0.00	0	0	0	0
CEFIGAR	109	0.00	0	0	0	0
ESPARTANO	103	0.00	0	0	0	0
FRN	101	0.00	0	0	0	0
NFG	100	0.00	0	0	0	0
TN-2000	98	0.00	0	0	0	0
MIYA	97	0.00	0	0	0	0
BES	95	0.00	0	0	0	0
IDEY	92	0.00	0	0	0	0
MOIR	90	0.00	0	0	0	0
MR 2000	85	0.00	0	0	0	0
MUI	79	0.00	0	0	0	0
FIODE	78	0.00	0	0	0	0
FPC	61	0.00	0	0	0	0
MIIDEA	59	0.00	0	0	0	0
FUCI	56	0.00	0	0	0	0
DFE	54	0.00	0	0	0	0
SDE	53	0.00	0	0	0	0
NGD	43	0.00	0	0	0	0
MEAI	26	0.00	0	0	0	0
Others	42,750	0.87	0	0	0	0
Total	4,929,788	100.00	101	88	18	207
Valid votes	4,929,788	85.53				
Invalid/blank votes	834,303	14.47				
Total votes	5,764,091	100.00				
Registered voters/turnout	10,991,482	52.44				
Source: CNE, CNE
