= Chamber of Deputies (Venezuela) =

Former lower house of the Parliament of Venezuela

The Chamber of Deputies (Spanish: Cámara de Diputados) was the lower house of Venezuela's legislative under its 1961 constitution; the Venezuelan Senate was the upper house. Under the 1999 constitution, the bicameral system was replaced by the unicameral National Assembly of Venezuela.

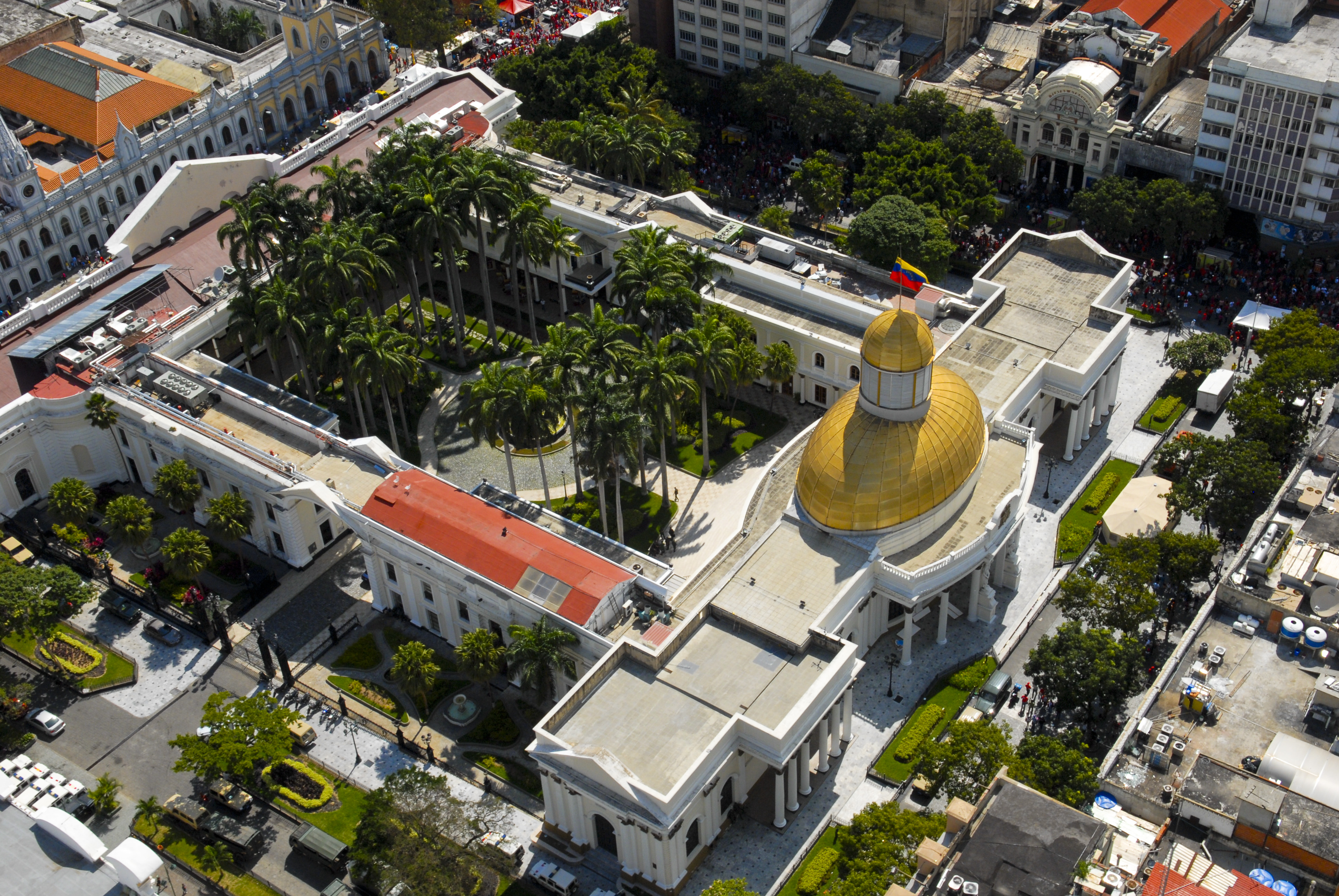
Palacio Federal Legislativo

At the 1993 Venezuelan parliamentary election, the Chamber saw the introduction of a mixed member proportional representation system, modelled on the German system, with some variations. This replaced the previous "closed-list proportional representation system [which had] led to an extremely party-centered system." The traditionally dominant Democratic Action and COPEI "supported it because it looked the most like the system under which they had prospered".

"Seats for the Chamber of Deputies were allocated to each state on the basis of its population. Since 1970 a number of citizens equal to 0.55% of the population is entitled to a deputy, but since 1993 no state can have fewer than three deputies. A quota for additional seats in the Chamber of Deputies is calculated by dividing the total number of votes cast by the number of deputies determined by the size of the population. The number of votes received by each party nationally for deputies is divided by this result, and the difference between the seats already won and this final result is the number of additional seats awarded to the party. As in the Senate, there has always been a limit to the total number of additional seats any given party can receive. (Since 1980 no party has been allowed more than five additional seats in the Chamber of Deputies.)"

At the Chamber's last election in 1998, it had 207 members.

== Presidents of the Chamber of Deputies ==
President	Tenure	Party
Rafael Caldera	1959–1962	COPEI
Manuel Vicente Ledezma	1962	Acción Democrática
Ignacio Luis Arcaya	1962–1964	Democratic Republican Union
Héctor Santaella	1964–1965	Democratic Republican Union
Alirio Ugarte Pelayo	1965–1966	Democratic Republican Union
Dionisio López Orihuela	1966–1967	Democratic Republican Union
Enrique Betancourt y Galindez	1967–1968	Democratic Republican Union
César Rondón Lovera	1968–1969	Acción Democrática
Jorge Dáger	1969–1970	Acción Democrática
Antonio Léidenz	1970–1974	Acción Democrática
Gonzalo Ramírez Cubillán	1974–1975	COPEI
Oswaldo Álvarez Paz	1975–1979	COPEI
Carlos Canache Mata	1979–1982	Acción Democrática
Armando Sánchez Bueno	1982–1983	Acción Democrática
Leonardo Ferrer	1984–1987	COPEI
José Rodríguez Iturbe	1987-1990	COPEI
Luis Enrique Oberto	1990-1994	COPEI
Carmelo Lauría	1994-1996	Acción Democrática
Ramón Guillermo Aveledo	1996–1998	COPEI
Ixora Rojas	1998–1999	Acción Democrática
Henrique Capriles	1999	COPEI

== Historical composition ==
Comm. / PEM / 5RM / MS / PDF / RC / DA / DRU / NC / PV / Copei / DNF / NCC / Others		Total; Seats
1958	7 / 73 / 34 / 18	132
1963	16 / 66 / 29 / 39 / 22 / 7	179
1968	25 / 10 / 66 / 18 / 59 / 21 / 15	214
1973	8 / 9 / 102 / 5 / 64 / 7 / 5	200
1978	11 / 88 / 84 / 16	199
1983	10 / 113 / 60 / 17	200
1988	18 / 97 / 67 / 19	201
1993	24 / 40 / 55 / 26 / 53 / 5	203
1998	46 / 17 / 62 / 20 / 28 / 34	207

== See also ==
- National Assembly (Venezuela), Unicameral legislature of Venezuela since 2000
- Senate of Venezuela, Upper house of Venezuela 1961–1999
