= Gessen =

Transliteration surname of the House of Hesse

The surname Gessen is a transliteration of the Russian spelling "Гессен" of the surname of Russified persons coming from the House of Hesse, including the last ruling Russian Empress Alix of Hesse: Russian: Виктория Алиса Елена Луиза Беатриса Гессен-Дармштадтская, German: Victoria Alix Helena Louise Beatrice von Hessen und bei Rhein.

The surname may refer to:

- Boris Hessen (1893–1936), Soviet physicist, philosopher, and historian of science, whose surname is sometimes transliterated as Gessen
- Iosif Gessen (1866–1943), Russian lawyer, statesman, and essayist
- Keith Gessen (born 1975), Russian-born American novelist, journalist, and editor
- Masha Gessen (born 1967), Russian and American journalist, author, translator, and activist
- Sergey Gessen (1887–1950), Russian philosopher, educator and publisher
- Vladimir Gessen (disambiguation), which may refer to:
  - Vladimir Augusto Gessen Rodríguez, Venezuelan politician, journalist and psychologist
  - Vladimir Matveevich Gessen (1868–1920), Russian jurist and politician

== See also ==
- Hessen (disambiguation)
