= List of governors of Bolívar =

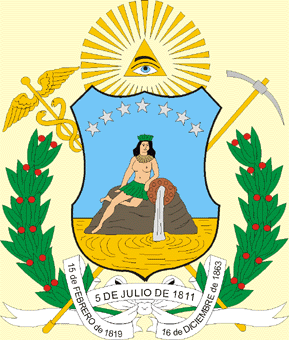
- State coat of Arms

- Flag of the State
- Incumbent; Yulisbeth García
- Style: Governor
- Status: Head of State
- Term length: Four years

This is a partial list of governors of the Venezuelan state of Bolívar. Until 1989 they were appointed by the president of Venezuela. Starting from that year they were elected in universal, direct and secret elections.

== Appointed governors ==
Period	Designate
1591–1597	Antonio Berrío
1597–1612	Fernando de Berrio y Oruna
1612–1614	Sancho de Alquiza
1614–1616	Antonio de Mujica y Builtron
1616–1618	Diego Palomeque de Acuña
1618	Juan de Lezama
1618–1619	Diego Palomeque de Acuña
1619–1629	Fernando de Berrio y Oruña
1629–1635	Luis de Monsalve
1635–1636	Cristóbal de Arana
1636–1642	Diego López de Escobar
1642–1647	Martin de Mendoza y Berrio
1647–1650	Cristóbal de Vera
1650–1652	Bravo de Acuña
1652–1653	Pedro de Brizuela
1653–1656	Cristóbal de Vera
1656–1657	Pedro de Brizuela
1657	Pedro de Padilla
1657–1658	Cristóbal de Vera
1658–1659	Pedro Juan de Viedman
1659	Pedro de Padilla
1660	Bravo de León
1660–1664	Pedro Juan de Viedman
1664–1665	José de Aspe y Zúñiga
1665	Francisco de Palacio y Rada
1665	Juan Bautista Valde
1667	Juan Bravo de Acuna
1667–1670	José de Aspe y Zúñiga
1670–1677	Diego Jiménez de Aldana
1677–1682	Tiburcio de Aspe y Zúñiga
1682–1690	Diego Suárez Ponce de Leon
1690–1696	Francisco de Meneses
1696–1701	José de León y Echales
1701–1704	Francisco Ruiz de Aguirre
1705–1711	Felipe de Artieda
1711–1716	Cristóbal Félix de Guzmán
1716–1721	Pedro de Jara
1721	Juán de Orvay
1721–1726	Martin Pérez de Anda y Salazar
1726–1731	Agustín de Arredondo
1729–1731	Juán de Dios Valdes
1731–1733	Bartolomé de Aldunate y Rada
1733–1735	José Orvay y P. Jiménez
1735	Esteban de Linan y Vera
1733–1735	Carlos Sucre
1735–1736	Vicente de Sucre
1736–1740	Carlos Sucre
1740–1745	Gregorio Espinoza de los Monteros
1745–1753	Diego Tabares Haumada y Barrios
1753–1757	Mateo Gual y Pueyo
1757–1759	Nicolás de Castro
1759–1763	José de Diguja y Villa Gómez
1662–1766	Joaquín Sábas Moreno de Mendoza
1766–1776	Manuel Centurión Guerrero de Torre
1776–1778	José de Linares
1778–1784	Antonio de Pereda Lasconótegu
1784–1790	Miguel Marmión
1790–1797	Luis Antonio Gil
1797–1810	Felipe de Inciarte
1810	José de Heres
1810–1812	Matías Farreras
1812–1813	José de Chastre
1813–1815	Matías Herreras
1815–1816	Nicolás Ceruti
1816–1817	Manuel Cedeño y Juan Vicente Cardozo
1817–1818	Tomás Montilla y Manuel Valdez
1818–1819	Manuel Valdez
1819–1820	Manuel Cedeño, Nicolás Pumar y A. Uzcátegui
1821–1822	Alonso Uzcátegui y José Ucroz
1822–1823	Francisco Conde
1823–1828	José Manuel Olivares
1828–1829	José de la Cruz Paredes y José Laurencio Silva
1829–1830	José de la Cruz Paredes, Manuel Ortiz Juan. A. Mirabal
1830–1831	Juan Antonio Mirabal, Felipe Domínguez y Eusebio Afanador
1831–1832	Eusebio Afanador, Bibiano Vidal y Pedro Volastero
1832–1835	Mateo Mediavilla, Marcos Calderón, Ramón Contasti y Manuel Capella
1836–1840	Tomás de Heres
1836	Manuel Capella
1837	Manuel Bermúdez
1838	Florentino Grillet
1838	José Gabriel Núñez
1839	Vicente León y Manuel Capella
1840	Manuel Zeron
1840	Manuel Capella
1840–1841	Ramón Burgos
1841–1842	Florentino Grillet
1842	Vicente Hernández
1842	José Antonio Franco
1842	Rafael Urdaneta
1842–1843	Ramón Burgos
1843–1845	Francisco Avendaño
1845	Fernando Carpio
1845	Francisco Auendaño
1846	José Tomás Machado
1846–1849	Pedro Muguerza
1849	Emeterio Emazábel
1849–1853	José Tomás Machado
1853	José Miguel La Grave
1853	Biviano Vidal
1853–1856	Francisco Capella
1856–1857	Juan Valles y Santos Gáspari
1858	Manuel Planchart
1858	Esteban Salom
1858	Juan Bautista Dalla-Costa (hijo)
1858	Santos Gáspari
1858–1859	Manuel Yánez
1859–1860	Bibiano Vidal
1860	Luis Soublette
1860–1861	Florentino Grillet
1861–1863	Juan Bautista Dalla-Costa (hijo)
1863	Miguel Aristiguieta
1864	José Maria Frontado
1864	José Miguel Núñez
1864–1865	Braulio Barrios
1865	José L. Arismendi
1865–1866	Federico Fortique
1866	Santos Jurado
1866–1871	Juan Bautista Dalla-Costa (hijo)
1871	Miguel Aristiguieta
1871	Francisco Goicoechea
1872	Antonio Dalla-Costa
1872	Florentino Grillet
1872	Jacinto Gutiérrez
1872	José Gabriel Ochoa
18??-1977	¿?
1877	Juan Antonio Machado
1877	Martín Davalillo
1877	Tomás Machado
1878	Máximo Hernández
1878	Florentino Vidal
1879	Rafael Carabaño
1880	Antonio Parejo
1880–1881	Venancio Pulgar
1881	Jorge Mediavilla
1881–1884	Ramón A. Mayol
1884–1886	J. M. Bermúdez Grau
1886–1887	Raimundo Fonseca
1887–1888	Santiago Izaguirre
1888–1890	José Maria Emazábel
1890–1892	José Ángel Ruiz
1894	Manuel González Gil
19??-1998	¿?
1898	Ernesto García
1899	Nicolás Rolando
1899	Lorenzo Guevara
1902	Juli. Sarría Hurtado
19??-1908	¿?
1908–1909	Francisco Linares Alcántara
1901–1911	Arístides Tellería
1911–1914	Luís Godoy
1914	David Gimón
1914–1921	Marcelino Torres García
1924–1930	Vicencio Pérez Soto
1930–1931	Silverio González
1931–1933	José J. Gabaldón
1933–1936	Toribio Muñoz
1936	Antonio Álamo
1936–1938	J. F. Machado Díaz
1938–1941	José Benigno Rendón
1941–1943	Carlos Meyer
1943	Gumersindo Torres
1943	José Nicomedes Rivas
1943–1945	Mario Briceño Iragorri
1945	Carlos Tinoco Rodil
1945	Julio César Paván
1945–1946	Héctor Guillermo Villalobos
1946–1948	Fernando Álvarez Manosalva
1948	Ángel Fariñas Salgado
1948	Alfonso Acosta Córdoba
1948–1953	José Gervasio Barceló Vidal
1953–1958	Eudoro Sánchez Lanz
1958	Carlos Tamayo Suárez
1958–1959	Horacio Cabrera Sifontes
159-1960	Diego Heredia Hernández
1960–1962	Leopoldo Sucre Figarella
1962–1964	Rafael Sanoja Valladares
1964–1967	Pedro Battistini Castro
1967–1968	Luís Raúl Vásquez Zamora
1968–1969	Rafael Sanoja Valladares
1969–1970	Carlos Eduardo Oxford Arias
1970–1974	Manuel D. Garrido Mendoza
1975–1977	Domingo Álvarez Rodríguez
1975–1977	Roberto Arreaza Contasti
1977	Fortunato Adrián Morillo
1977–1979	Jesús Álvarez Fernández
1979	José Miguel Gómez Bello
1979–1982	Alberto Palazzi
1982–1983	Alcides Sánchez Negrón
1983–1984	Paúl Von Büren Pesquera
1984–1986	Edgar Vallée Vallée
1986–1987	René Silva Idrogo
1987	Pablo Gamboa Rivero
1987–1989	Luís Felipe Goubat Delgado
1989	Omar González Moreno

== Modern governors ==
Governors chosen by popular election

Took office	Left office	Governor	Vote
1989	1992	Andrés Velásquez, La Causa R	40.30
1992	1995	Andrés Velásquez, La Causa R	63.36
1995	2000	Jorge Carvajal, Acción Democrática	49.41
2000	2004	Antonio Rojas Suárez, MVR	63.68
2004	2008	Francisco Rangel Gómez, MVR	58.85
2008	2012	Francisco Rangel Gómez, PSUV	47.38
2012	2017	Francisco Rangel Gómez, PSUV	46.55
2017	2021	Justo Noguera Pietri, PSUV	49,09
2021	2025	Ángel Bautista Marcano, PSUV	42,88
2025	2025	Yuraima Patricia Cabrera, PSUV	
2025	2029	Yulisbeth García, PSUV	87,85

== See also ==
- States of Venezuela
