= Eduardo Fernández (Venezuelan politician) =

Venezuelan politician

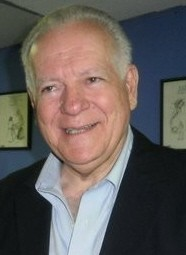
Eduardo Fernández in 2011

Eduardo Fernández (born 18 October 1940) is a Venezuelan politician and lawyer. He was elected to the Venezuelan Chamber of Deputies in 1968, serving until 1989 (with an interruption to serve as the Deputy Secretary General of the Presidency for Rafael Caldera, until 1974), and was a presidential candidate for COPEI in 1988. He has also served as President of the Christian Democrat International.

== Background ==
Fernández gained a law degree from Andrés Bello Catholic University in 1963, and graduate degrees in economic development and political science at the International Institute of Social Studies in the Netherlands in 1965 and Georgetown University in the United States in 1967, respectively. He then returned to Venezuela, joining the faculty of Andrés Bello Catholic University.

== Political career ==
Fernández was elected to the Venezuelan Chamber of Deputies in 1968. Soon after his election he took leave from Congress to serve in the cabinet of Rafael Caldera, as the Deputy Secretary General of the Presidency. He returned to Congress in 1974, following the election of Carlos Andrés Pérez, and was re-elected for successive terms until 1989. In 1989 he was elected President of the Christian Democrat International.

Fernández was a presidential candidate for COPEI in the 1988 Venezuelan general election, losing to Carlos Andrés Pérez of Democratic Action. On 25 April 1993 COPEI held open primary elections to choose a presidential candidate for the 1993 Venezuelan presidential election; almost 20% of Venezuela's then 9.8 million voters participated in the primary. Fernández lost to the Governor of Zulia, Oswaldo Álvarez Paz, who had resigned his position as Governor to run. Fernández again sought the COPEI presidential nomination for the 1998 Venezuelan presidential election, this time losing to Irene Saez.

== Other activities ==
- President of the Aristides Calvani International Training Center - IFEDEC.
- President of the Venezuelan think tank, Fundación Pensamiento y Acción, and was President of the Madrid-based center for political education, Fundación Popular Iberoamericana, for a number of years.
- Member of Board of Trustees of the Universidad Metropolitana in Caracas
- Member of the Board of Regents of the Instituto de Estudios Superiores de Administración (IESA).
