= 1988 Venezuelan general election =

- 4 December 1988
- Presidential election
- Registered: 9,185,647
- Turnout: 81.85% (▼5.90pp)
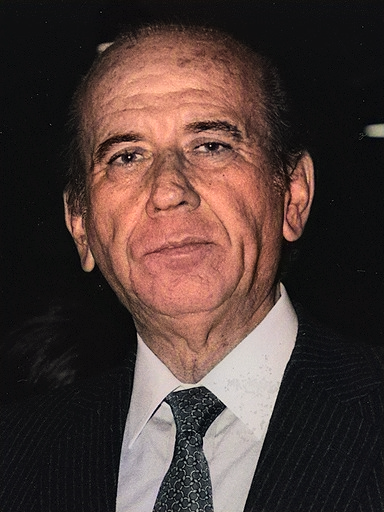

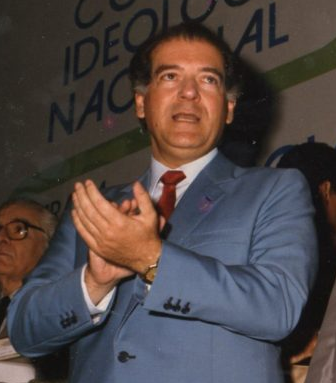
Nominee	Carlos Andrés Pérez	Eduardo Fernández
Party	Democratic Action	Copei
Popular vote	3,868,843	2,955,061
Percentage	52.91%	40.42%
- Results by region
President before election
Jaime Lusinchi
Democratic Action
Elected President
Carlos Andrés Pérez
Democratic Action

General elections were held in Venezuela on 4 December 1988. The presidential elections were won by Carlos Andrés Pérez of Democratic Action, who received 53% of the vote. His party won the most seats in the Chamber of Deputies and Senate, but lost its absolute majority. Voter turnout was 82%.

== Background ==
Democratic Action President Jaime Lusinchi backed Octavio Lepage to succeed him as the party's candidate for the election, but in a primary election the party chose Carlos Andrés Pérez, (previously president from 1974 to 1979).

== Results ==
=== President ===
Candidate	Party	Votes	%
Carlos Andrés Pérez	Democratic Action	3,879,024	52.91
Eduardo Fernández	Copei	2,963,015	40.42
Teodoro Petkoff	MAS–MIR	200,479	2.73
Godofredo Marín	Authentic Renewal Organization	62,896	0.86
Ismenia Villalba	Democratic Republican Union	61,684	0.84
Edmundo Chirinos	Communist Party of Venezuela	59,034	0.81
Vladimir Gessen	New Democratic Generation	27,833	0.38
Andrés Velásquez	Radical Cause	24,561	0.34
Gastón Guisandes	National Opinion	10,720	0.15
David Nieves	Socialist League	10,065	0.14
Jorge Olavarria	New Republic	9,969	0.14
Alberto Marini Urdaneta	Nationalist Unity Front	5,821	0.08
Luis Hernández Campos	Nationalist Civic Crusade	2,589	0.04
Luis Alfonso Godoy	Social Power of the Nation	2,532	0.03
Leopoldo Díaz Bruzual	New Alternative	2,528	0.03
Alejandro Peña Esclusa	Venezuelan Labour Party	2,168	0.03
Rómulo Abrue Duarte	Guiding Venezuelan Spiritual Force	1,513	0.02
José Rojas Contreras	New Order	1,176	0.02
Hernández Escarrá Quintara	Venezuelan National Movement	1,412	0.02
Alberto Solano	Emancipatory Force	818	0.01
Napoleón Barrios	Movement for the Defence of Nationalist Ideas	736	0.01
Arévalo Tovar Yajur	Independent Nationalist Organisation	432	0.01
Rómulo Yordi Carvajal	People	382	0.01
Total		7,331,387	100.00
Valid votes		7,331,387	97.51
Invalid/blank votes		187,276	2.49
Total votes		7,518,663	100.00
Registered voters/turnout		9,185,647	81.85
Source: Nohlen

=== Congress ===
Party	Votes	%	Seats			
Party	Votes	%	Chamber	+/–	Senate	+/–
Democratic Action	3,123,790	43.29	97	–16	22	–6
Copei	2,247,236	31.14	67	+7	20	+6
MAS–MIR	733,421	10.16	18	+6	3	+1
New Democratic Generation	236,833	3.28	6	+6	1	+1
Radical Cause	117,562	1.63	3	+3	0	0
People's Electoral Movement	116,621	1.62	2	–1	0	0
Democratic Republican Union	103,883	1.44	2	–1	0	0
Formula 1	93,228	1.29	2	New	0	New
Authentic Renewal Organization	92,117	1.28	2	New	0	New
Communist Party of Venezuela	70,058	0.97	1	–2	0	0
National Opinion	41,984	0.58	1	–2	0	0
Socialist League	36,394	0.50	0	–1	0	0
National Integration Movement	33,728	0.47	0	–1	0	0
New Republic	24,596	0.34	0	0	0	0
Electoral Renewal Integration	18,986	0.26	0	0	0	0
National Party	14,500	0.20	0	New	0	New
51 other parties	111,463	1.54	0	–	0	–
Total	7,216,400	100.00	201	+1	46	+2
Valid votes	7,216,400	96.22				
Invalid/blank votes	283,635	3.78				
Total votes	7,500,035	100.00				
Registered voters/turnout	9,185,647	81.65				
Source: Nohlen, SIC
