= United for Human Rights =

United for Human Rights (Spanish: Unidos por los Derechos Humanos, UDH) was a political party in Venezuela. The party first contested national elections in 1998, when it won a single seat in the Chamber of Deputies. However, it lost its seat in the 2000 elections.
