= Ixora Rojas Paz =

Venezuelan lawyer and politician (1955–2016)

Ixora Robertina Rojas Paz

President of the Chamber of Deputies of the Congress of Venezuela
- In office 1998–1999
- Preceded by: Ramón Guillermo Aveledo
- Succeeded by: Henrique Capriles

Personal details
- Profession: politician, lawyer

Ixora Robertina Rojas Paz (June 24, 1955 – June 19, 2016) was a Venezuelan lawyer and politician. She represented Zulia in the National Congress of Venezuela and served as president of the Chamber of Deputies from 1998 to 1999.

== Career ==
She first became involved in politics at the age of thirteen, while she was studying at the Liceo Baralt in Maracaibo. She moved to the Capital Region of Venezuela, where she married at the age of fourteen.

She served as leader of the Democratic Action party in Zulia state and as secretary for the national women's office for the so-called "tolda blanca".

In 2008, she became the leader of the Asociación Latinoamericana de Mujeres Socialdemócratas ("Latin American Association of Social Democratic Women"). She also presented herself as an independent candidate for the governorship of Zulia. She served as vice-president of the Socialist International Women.

She died from cancer at the Hospital de Clínicas Caracas in Caracas at the age of 60.
