= Oswaldo Álvarez Paz =

Venezuelan politician

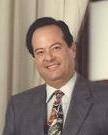
- Álvarez Paz in 1992

Governor of Zulia
- In office 23 January 1990 – 1 May 1993
- Preceded by: Ismael Ordaz González
- Succeeded by: Lolita Aniyar de Castro

President of the Chamber of Deputies
- In office 23 January 1975 – 23 January 1979
- Preceded by: Gonzalo Ramírez Cubillán
- Succeeded by: Carlos Canache Mata

Member of the Venezuelan Chamber of Deputies
- In office 23 January 1969 – 23 January 1989

Personal details
- Born: Oswaldo Álvarez Paz; 10 February 1943 (age 83) Maracaibo, Zulia, Venezuela
- Party: Copei (1966-2005); Popular Movement (2005–present)
- Education: University of Zulia

Oswaldo Álvarez Paz (born 10 February 1943) is a Venezuelan politician. He was born in Maracaibo, Zulia and graduated in law from the University of Zulia. He was a Member of the Republic's Congress for over 20 years (periods from 1966 to 1993), president of the Venezuelan Chamber of Deputies (1975 to 1979) and participated/directed the most important commissions of the Venezuelan Parliament.

== Career ==
He was Rafael Caldera's campaign manager for the 1983 Venezuelan presidential election. In December 1989, he became the first governor of the State of Zulia to be elected by the people, being re-elected for a second period in December 1992.

On April 25, 1993, his party, COPEI, held open primary elections to choose a presidential candidate for the 1993 Venezuelan presidential election; almost 20% of Venezuela's 9.8m voters participated in the primary. Álvarez Paz defeated COPEI party leader Eduardo Fernández, resigning his position as governor in order to run. In the campaign Paz supported privatization and foreign investment, and said he aimed for Venezuela to join the North American Free Trade Agreement; he identified the contemporary political figure he admired most as Ronald Reagan. Oswaldo Alvarez Paz obtained 22.7% of the votes, in an election where the winner, Rafael Caldera, won with 30.5%.

In May 2005 Alvarez Paz created a new party called "Alianza Popular" (Popular Alliance), organization that, as it states in its by-laws, defends and promotes freedom, democracy State of Law and human rights, as well as the promotion and protection of private property, the contribution to poverty eradication and the disappearing of corruption.

On 22 March 2010, Oswaldo Alvarez Paz was arrested for remarks made during a broadcast of the Globovisión talkshow Aló Ciudadano ("Hello Citizen"). Álvarez Paz had said "Venezuela has turned into a center of operations that facilitates the business of drug trafficking." He also accused "Chavez of being a subversive element and having direct links with FARC and ETA." He was charged with conspiracy, and with spreading false information and publicly inciting violation of the law, and was sentenced to serve two years in prison. He was released on bail in mid May 2010.

== See also ==
- Political prisoners in Venezuela
