= Gessen (disambiguation) =

Gessen is a surname.

Gessen may also refer to:

- Rosaryville, Louisiana, Louisiana, USA
- St. Joseph Abbey, Louisiana, original name

== See also ==
- Giessen
