= Vladimir Gessen =

Vladimir Gessen may refer to:

- Vladimir Gessen (jurist) (1868–1920), Russian jurist and politician
- Vladimir Gessen (Venezuelan politician), Venezuelan politician, journalist and psychologist
