= Andrés Velásquez =

Venezuelan politician (born 1953)

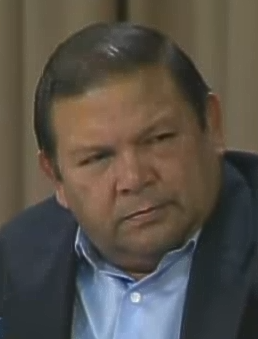
- Velásquez in 2014

41st Governor of Bolívar
- In office 1989–1995
- Preceded by: Pedro Battistini (AD)
- Succeeded by: Jorge Carvajal (AD)

Personal details
- Born: 10 November 1953 (age 72) Puerto La Cruz, Venezuela
- Party: Radical Cause

Andrés Velásquez is a Venezuelan politician of the Radical Cause (La Causa Radical) party.

== Career ==
Formerly the general secretary of the steelworkers union of SIDOR, he became one of the leaders of Radical Cause after the death of its founder, Alfredo Maneiro, in 1982. He was the governor of Bolívar State from 1989 to 1995, and a member of the National Assembly of Venezuela from 2000 to 2006. In the 2000 Venezuelan regional elections he ran unsuccessfully for the governorship of Anzoátegui state.

He was Radical Cause's candidate in the 1993 Venezuelan presidential election, coming fourth with 22% of the vote; Rafael Caldera became president with 30.5%. He had also been Radical Cause's candidate in the 1983 election and 1988 election, gaining less than 1% of the vote.

In the Venezuelan regional elections, 2008 he ran again for governor of Bolívar state, coming second with 30% of the vote. Velásquez ran again for governor of Bolívar in 2012 and 2017, coming close second and claiming irregularities both times.

In May 2019, Supreme Tribunal of Justice ordered the prosecution of seven National Assembly members, including Velásquez, for their actions during the failed uprising. However, Velásquez's name was later scrapped from the list.
