= Jorge Olavarría =

Venezuelan historian, writer and politician

Jorge Olavarría in 1999

Jorge Olavarría (12 December 1933 – 18 April 2005) was a Venezuelan journalist, politician, historian, and writer.

== Career ==
He was editor of the magazine Resumen from 1973 to 1984. Collections of his writings for El Nacional and El Universal were published in 1999 and 1994, respectively. He was elected to the Venezuelan Chamber of Deputies in the 1963 elections, and re-elected in the 1968 elections. He was a presidential candidate in the 1983 election and the 1988 election, for the party "OPINA" (Opinion), and was a member of the 1999 Constituent Assembly of Venezuela. He also served as Venezuela's ambassador to Britain (1969–70). As a historian and writer, his books covered subjects such as the 1945 Venezuelan coup d'état and the dictator Juan Vicente Gómez.

He studied law at the Complutense University of Madrid.

== Books ==
- La Revolución olvidada: el 18 de octubre de 1945, 2008, Fundación Olavarría
- Gómez: un enigma histórico: una revisión al fenómeno histórico y político de Juan Vicente Gómez, 2007, Fundación Olavarría
- Historia viva, 2002-2003: la rebelión civil, el referéndum revocatorio, 2003, Alfadil
- Historia viva: artículos publicados en El Nacional, marzo 1998--marzo 1999, 1999, El Nacional
- Una Constitución para una nueva república: presentado en el VI Congreso Venezolana de Derecho Constitucional, celebrado en Caracas, los días 27, 28 y 29 de Octubre de 1999, en la Universidad Católica Andrés Bello, 1999, Editorial Melvin
- No, señor Presidente! no!: artículos publicados en "El Universal" 1994, 1994
- Democracia radical, 1993, Ediciones Centauro
- Dios y federación: el fetichismo federal en el pasado, presente y futuro de Venezuela, 1988, Fundación para una Nueva República
- Proyecto Nueva República, 1988, Fundación para una Nueva República
- El caso"Sidor.", 1968, Guanarteme
