= Ramón Guillermo Aveledo =

Venezuelan politician

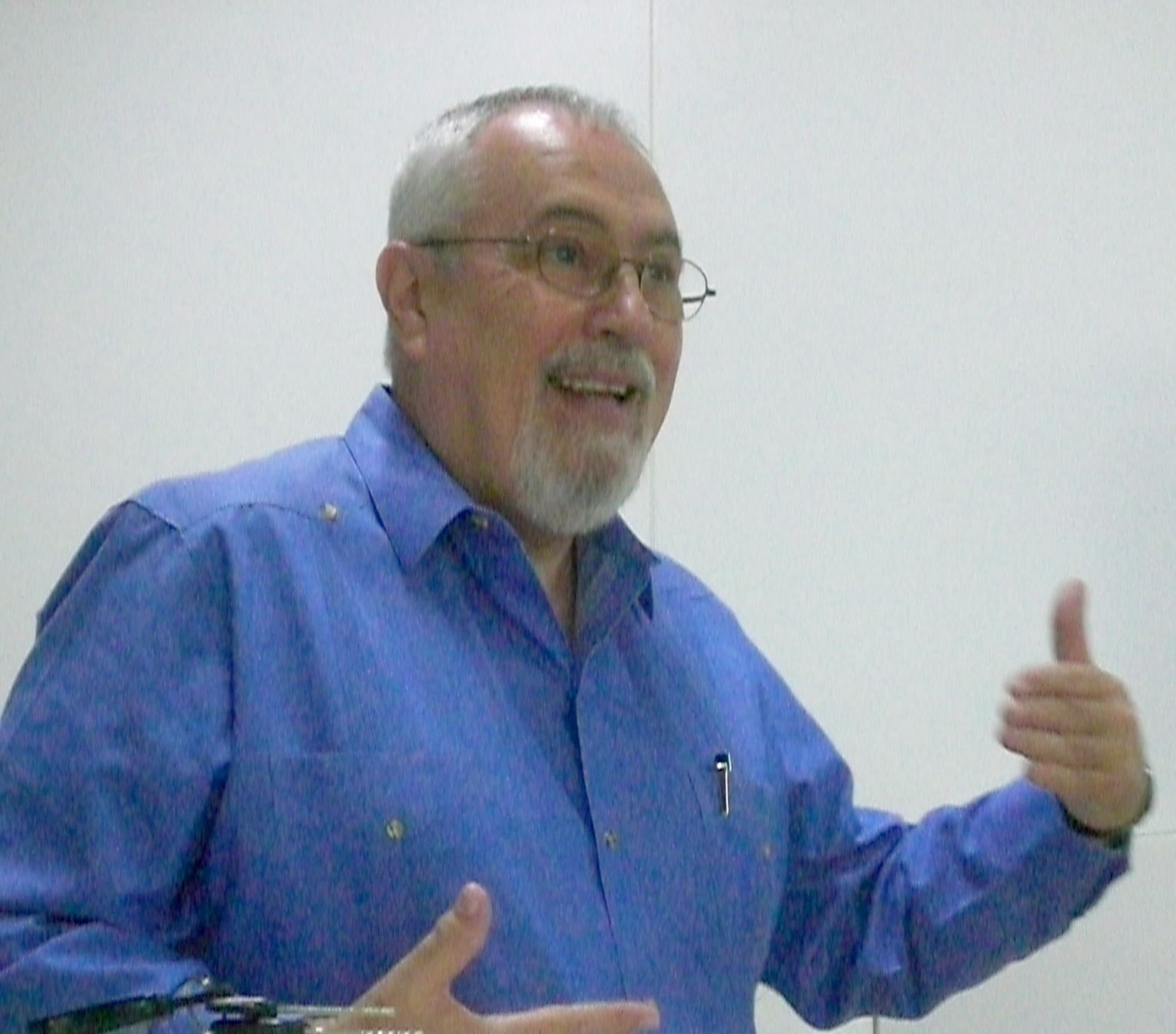
- Aveledo in 2009

Executive Secretary of the Democratic Unity Roundtable
- In office March 2009 – 30 July 2014
- Preceded by: Position established
- Succeeded by: Jesús Torrealba

President of the Venezuelan Professional Baseball League
- In office 2002–2007
- Preceded by: Carlos Cordido Valery
- Succeeded by: José Grasso Vecchio

President of the Chamber of Deputies
- In office 23 January 1996 – 23 January 1998
- Preceded by: Carmelo Lauría
- Succeeded by: Ixora Rojas

Member of the Chamber of Deputies for Lara State
- In office 23 January 1989 – 22 December 1999

President of Venezolana de Televisión
- In office 1983–1984
- President: Luis Herrera Campins
- Preceded by: Rubén Osorio Canales
- Succeeded by: Pedro Francisco Lizandro

Personal details
- Born: Ramón Guillermo Aveledo; 22 August 1950 (age 76) Barquisimeto, Lara, Venezuela
- Party: Copei
- Other political affiliations: Democratic Unity Roundtable
- Education: Central University of Venezuela
- Profession: Politician, academic, businessman

Ramón Guillermo Aveledo (born 22 August 1950) is a Venezuelan politician, academic, businessman, and columnist, and former Executive Secretary of the opposition electoral coalition Democratic Unity Roundtable.

== Biography ==
A former congressman, he was President of the Venezuelan Professional Baseball League from 2001 to 2007, and served under Luis Herrera Campins as Secretary of the Presidency (1979–1984).

Author of over 30 books, he is professor at the Universidad Metropolitana in Caracas.

He was elected to the Venezuelan Chamber of Deputies three times, and served as its President twice.

He is a columnist for Globovisión.

He is a member of the board of the Rómulo Betancourt Foundation, and President of the Instituto de Estudios Parliamentarios Fermín Toro.

== Selected bibliography ==
- El Llanero Solidario: Verdades ignoradas sobre Luis Herrera Campins y su tiempo (Editorial Libros Marcados, Caracas, 2012) – biography of Luis Herrera Campins
- El Dictador: Anatomía de la Tiranía (Editorial Libros Marcados, Caracas, 2008)
- El poder político en Venezuela (2007)
