= 1983 Venezuelan general election =

- 4 December 1983
- Presidential election
- Registered: 7,777,892
- Turnout: 87.75% (▲0.19pp)
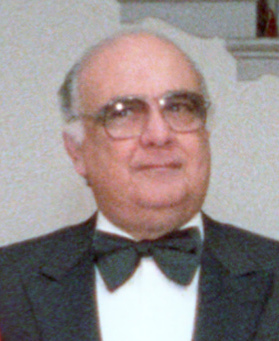

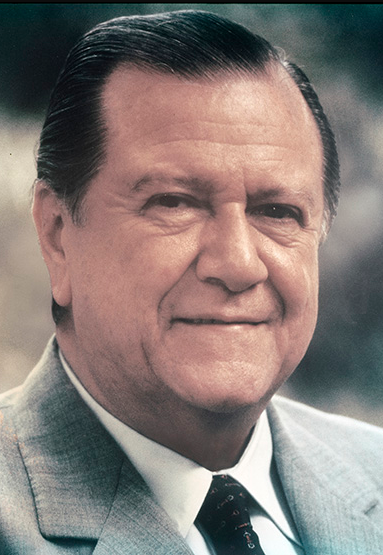
Nominee	Jaime Lusinchi	Rafael Caldera
Party	Democratic Action	Copei
Popular vote	3,773,731	2,298,176
Percentage	56.72%	34.54%
- Results by region
President before election
Luis Herrera Campins
Copei
Elected President
Jaime Lusinchi
Democratic Action

General elections for the presidency, Congress and state legislatures were held in Venezuela on 4 December 1983. The presidential elections were won by Jaime Lusinchi of Democratic Action, who received 56.7% of the vote, whilst his party won a majority of seats in the Chamber of Deputies and Senate.

== Results ==
=== President ===
Candidate	Party	Votes	%
Jaime Lusinchi	AD–URD–VOI	3,773,731	56.72
Rafael Caldera	Copei–ICC–NGD–CIMA–FUN–MIO	2,298,176	34.54
Teodoro Petkoff	MAS–MIR–IRE	277,498	4.17
José Vicente Rangel	MEP–PCV–NA–LS–GAR–SI	221,918	3.34
Jorge Olavarria	National Opinion	32,254	0.48
Gonzalo Pérez Hernández	National Integration Movement	19,528	0.29
Luis Rangel	National Rescue	8,820	0.13
Andrés Velásquez	Radical Cause	5,917	0.09
Vinicio Romero	National Confidence	3,236	0.05
Alberto Solano	Emancipatory Force	1,650	0.02
Félix Díaz Otega	New Order	1,610	0.02
Juan Iarra Riverol	Venezuelan Nationalist Party	1,363	0.02
Adolfo Alcala	Independent Voters	1,077	0.02
Other candidates		6,539	0.10
Total		6,653,317	100.00
Valid votes		6,653,317	97.48
Invalid/blank votes		171,863	2.52
Total votes		6,825,180	100.00
Registered voters/turnout		7,777,892	87.75
Source: National Electoral Council

=== Congress ===
Party	Votes	%	Seats			
Party	Votes	%	Chamber	+/–	Senate	+/–
Democratic Action	3,284,166	49.90	113	+25	28	+7
Copei	1,887,226	28.68	60	–24	14	–7
Movement for Socialism	377,795	5.74	10	–1	2	0
National Opinion	130,022	1.98	3	+3	0	0
People's Electoral Movement	129,263	1.96	3	–1	0	0
Democratic Republican Union	125,458	1.91	3	0	0	0
Communist Party of Venezuela	115,162	1.75	3	+2	0	0
Revolutionary Left Movement	103,923	1.58	2	–2	0	0
New Alternative	68,729	1.04	1	New	0	New
Independents with Change	63,822	0.97	0	New	0	New
National Integration Movement	59,870	0.91	1	0	0	0
Socialist League	53,506	0.81	1	0	0	0
Radical Cause	35,304	0.54	0	0	0	0
New Republic	29,642	0.45	0	New	0	New
Majoritarian Independent Committee	18,762	0.29	0	New	0	New
National Rescue	15,083	0.23	0	New	0	New
Revolutionary Action Group	15,033	0.23	0	0	0	0
Nationalist Unity Front	12,262	0.19	0	0	0	0
New Democratic Generation	10,288	0.16	0	New	0	New
Organised Independent Movement	10,020	0.15	0	New	0	New
29 other parties	35,563	0.54	0	–	0	–
Total	6,580,899	100.00	200	+1	44	0
Valid votes	6,580,899	96.42				
Invalid/blank votes	244,281	3.58				
Total votes	6,825,180	100.00				
Registered voters/turnout	7,777,892	87.75				
Source: Nohlen
