= 1993 Venezuelan general election =

- 5 December 1993
- Presidential election
- Registered: 9,688,795
- Turnout: 60.16% (▼21.69pp)
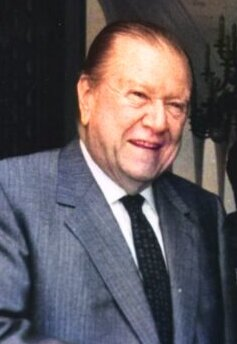

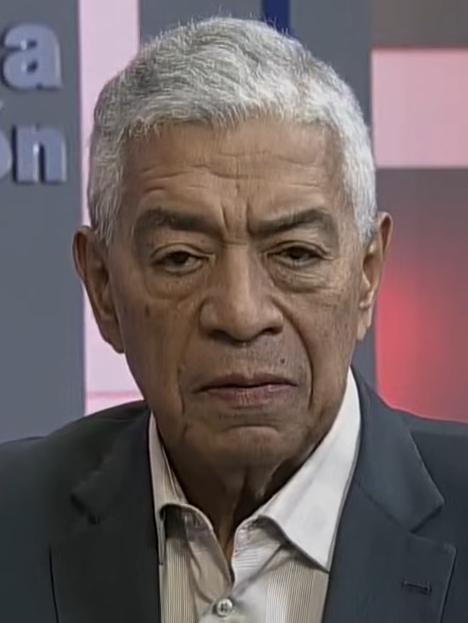

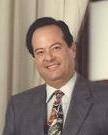

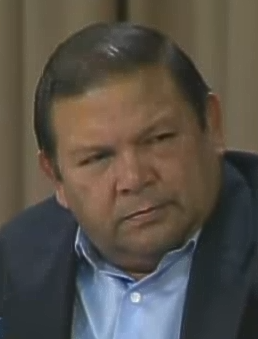
Nominee	Rafael Caldera	Claudio Fermín
Party	CVGC	Democratic Action
Popular vote	1,710,722	1,326,287
Percentage	30.46%	23.60%
Nominee	Oswaldo Álvarez Paz	Andrés Velásquez
Party	Copei	LCR
Popular vote	1,276,506	1,232,653
Percentage	22.73%	21.95%
- Results by state
President before election
Ramón José Velásquez
Democratic Action
Elected President
Rafael Caldera
CVGC

General elections were held in Venezuela on 5 December 1993. The presidential elections were won by former president Rafael Caldera of National Convergence, who received 30% of the vote. Democratic Action remained the largest party in the Chamber of Deputies and Senate, which were elected on separate ballots for the first time. Voter turnout was 60%, the lowest since World War II.

The elections were a departure from the traditional two-party system in Venezuela.

== Background ==
The election campaign was dominated by the corruption charges brought against sitting President Carlos Andrés Pérez, which led to his impeachment on 20 May 1993. He was replaced by Octavio Lepage as Acting President until Ramón José Velásquez was elected by Congress as interim President on 5 June. An atmosphere of economic and political crisis prevailed, with general economic problems compounded by a banking crisis, and a declining legitimacy of the traditional main parties, Democratic Action and Copei. The previous year had seen two coup attempts in February and November, reflecting widespread popular discontent with the political establishment.

Rafael Caldera, founder of Copei, rejected his old party and led a "National Convergence" of 17 smaller parties — including the Movement for Socialism, the Democratic Republican Union, the People's Electoral Movement and the Communist Party of Venezuela. His campaign promises included pardoning the 1992 coup plotters, including Hugo Chávez.

The presidential election was held under first-past-the-post voting, while the Congressional elections were the first held under a mixed member proportional representation system, modelled on the German system, with some variations. The traditionally dominant Democratic Action and Copei "supported it because it looked the most like the system under which they had prospered". The MMP system continued to use the old formula of assigning seats to states based on multiplying the total population by 0.55%, with a minimum of three deputies from each state (thus over-representing sparsely populated states). Half each state's seats were then elected in single seat districts, and the remainder by closed party list. Parties could receive up to five additional seats based on their national vote total, to provide greater proportionality.

== Results ==
=== President ===
Candidate	Party	Votes	%
Rafael Caldera	National Convergence	1,710,722	30.46
Claudio Fermín	Democratic Action	1,325,287	23.60
Oswaldo Álvarez Paz	Copei	1,276,506	22.73
Andrés Velásquez	Radical Cause	1,232,653	21.95
Modesto Rivero	Authentic Renewal Organization	20,814	0.37
Nelso Ojeda Valenzuela	Independent Popular Force	18,690	0.33
Luis Alberto Machado	Intelligence Revolution	6,851	0.12
Fernando Bianco	Community on the Move	5,590	0.10
José Antonio Cova	New Democratic Generation	4,937	0.09
Gabriel Puerta Aponte	Movement for Popular Democracy	3,746	0.07
Rhona Ottolina	Formula 1	3,633	0.06
Romuló Abreu Duarte	Guiding Venezuelan Spiritual Force	1,554	0.03
Jesús Tang	National Party	1,251	0.02
Blas García Núñez	Venezuelan Ecological Party	1,198	0.02
Juán Chacín	Democratic Organised Power of Renewal Structure	981	0.02
Carmen de González	Nationalist Civic Crusade	866	0.02
Felix Díaz Ortega	New Order	780	0.01
Temistocles Fernández	Total Independent	640	0.01
Total		5,616,699	100.00
Valid votes		5,616,699	96.35
Invalid/blank votes		212,517	3.65
Total votes		5,829,216	100.00
Registered voters/turnout		9,688,795	60.16
Source: Nohlen, PDBA

=== Senate ===
Party	Votes	%	Seats	+/–
Democratic Action	1,165,322	24.08	16	–6
Copei	1,103,896	22.81	14	–6
Radical Cause	1,005,816	20.78	9	+9
National Convergence	650,352	13.44	6	New
Movement for Socialism	526,197	10.87	5	–
Authentic Renewal Organization	41,157	0.85	0	0
People's Electoral Movement	26,545	0.55	0	0
Democratic Republican Union	25,732	0.53	0	0
National Integration Movement	23,459	0.48	0	New
Communist Party of Venezuela	18,862	0.39	0	0
New Democratic Generation	14,159	0.29	0	–1
National Opinion	13,794	0.28	0	0
Independent Popular Force	12,908	0.27	0	–
Formula 1	12,524	0.26	0	0
Emerging People	10,709	0.22	0	–
PCI	10,092	0.21	0	–
GP	9,901	0.20	0	–
Community Development	9,656	0.20	0	–
Nationalist United Front	8,791	0.18	0	–
National Renewal Movement	8,322	0.17	0	–
Advanced Popular	8,256	0.17	0	–
Movement for Popular Democracy	8,117	0.17	0	–
OCIM	6,352	0.13	0	–
GIRASOL	5,647	0.12	0	–
Active Democratic Nationalist Organisation	5,089	0.11	0	–
Venezuelan Ecological Party	4,613	0.10	0	–
UVI	4,494	0.09	0	–
Renewal	4,208	0.09	0	–
Popular Democratic Force	4,002	0.08	0	–
MERY	3,883	0.08	0	–
Community on the Move	3,830	0.08	0	–
Patriotic Union	3,018	0.06	0	–
Socialist League	2,858	0.06	0	–
New Order	2,772	0.06	0	–
CARICUAO DECIDE	2,597	0.05	0	–
U	2,574	0.05	0	–
FT	2,440	0.05	0	–
The People to Power	2,297	0.05	0	–
MACARIO	2,283	0.05	0	–
CUMANAGOTOS	2,060	0.04	0	–
Democratic Organised Power of Renewal Structure	2,045	0.04	0	–
Social Project	1,979	0.04	0	–
Democratic Factor	1,972	0.04	0	–
Independent Nationalist Organisation	1,938	0.04	0	–
OI	1,897	0.04	0	–
Integral Democratic Movement	1,844	0.04	0	–
Out of Love for Venezuela	1,733	0.04	0	–
Common Sense	1,678	0.03	0	–
National Party	1,478	0.03	0	–
ASI	1,387	0.03	0	–
UO	1,313	0.03	0	–
Electoral Renewal Integration	1,310	0.03	0	–
Independents with Change	1,266	0.03	0	–
National Integration Front	1,215	0.03	0	–
FACTOR E	1,140	0.02	0	–
Guiding Venezuelan Spiritual Force	1,132	0.02	0	–
AGAIN	1,107	0.02	0	–
DCARA	1,098	0.02	0	–
DECISION COJEDENA	1,062	0.02	0	–
Republican Movement	1,060	0.02	0	–
FIE	1,018	0.02	0	–
CHACAO 92	944	0.02	0	–
Union for Progress (Venezuela)	924	0.02	0	–
CPPP	889	0.02	0	–
IDEAL	864	0.02	0	–
Nationalist Civic Crusade	862	0.02	0	–
New Republic	849	0.02	0	–
NI	830	0.02	0	–
MAR	798	0.02	0	–
VO	794	0.02	0	–
PND	785	0.02	0	–
Independent Action Force	781	0.02	0	–
MIPO	766	0.02	0	–
CD	725	0.01	0	–
UCII	678	0.01	0	–
FOVE	654	0.01	0	–
Socialist Workers' Party	649	0.01	0	–
CIPREA	644	0.01	0	–
Agricultural Action	630	0.01	0	–
VCI	583	0.01	0	–
M93	575	0.01	0	–
DDP	546	0.01	0	–
PEM	539	0.01	0	–
MAP	505	0.01	0	–
MIAP	482	0.01	0	–
PUNI	482	0.01	0	–
FURIA	426	0.01	0	–
MIO	415	0.01	0	–
JL	396	0.01	0	–
MRI	384	0.01	0	–
UPC	364	0.01	0	–
MDIPG	357	0.01	0	–
MONCHO	350	0.01	0	–
LVP	350	0.01	0	–
EREDE	344	0.01	0	–
PENSAMIENTO NACIONAL	340	0.01	0	–
VIA	319	0.01	0	–
New Time	318	0.01	0	–
MIL	308	0.01	0	–
DAR	304	0.01	0	–
Majoritarian Independent Committee	303	0.01	0	–
GRITO VECINAL	289	0.01	0	–
BP	286	0.01	0	–
FIG	277	0.01	0	–
VEA	275	0.01	0	–
Independent Committee	258	0.01	0	–
EPI	251	0.01	0	–
PODER 7	232	0.00	0	–
PINDD	230	0.00	0	–
REPO	225	0.00	0	–
MIP	209	0.00	0	–
GEVE	198	0.00	0	–
MIRE	198	0.00	0	–
Independent Solidarity	197	0.00	0	–
National Authentic Party	195	0.00	0	–
FIC	188	0.00	0	–
ARDE	181	0.00	0	–
MIIDEA	174	0.00	0	–
CRA	173	0.00	0	–
CDA	172	0.00	0	–
ACONA	172	0.00	0	–
RA	147	0.00	0	–
MDV	133	0.00	0	–
CIN	124	0.00	0	–
FUPSSB	121	0.00	0	–
MINERO	118	0.00	0	–
SOL	118	0.00	0	–
AVI	116	0.00	0	–
MIDV	114	0.00	0	–
ISA	113	0.00	0	–
FE	111	0.00	0	–
MICA	94	0.00	0	–
GEIJM	93	0.00	0	–
LVY	89	0.00	0	–
MNVI	84	0.00	0	–
CADEM	80	0.00	0	–
CP	75	0.00	0	–
PEIP	75	0.00	0	–
GDP	72	0.00	0	–
MPN	66	0.00	0	–
TNSD	57	0.00	0	–
MAICITO	54	0.00	0	–
ORI	50	0.00	0	–
EEF 94	39	0.00	0	–
Apureño Independent Movement	36	0.00	0	–
FEG	36	0.00	0	–
GAP	25	0.00	0	–
YIP	25	0.00	0	–
MIPAYCA	24	0.00	0	–
MAICITO	21	0.00	0	–
CIV	11	0.00	0	–
MIDEAS	11	0.00	0	–
OIPLR	10	0.00	0	–
Republican Democratic Party	5	0.00	0	–
MEIAMA	4	0.00	0	–
AUV	3	0.00	0	–
PE	1	0.00	0	–
Total	4,840,047	100.00	50	+4
Valid votes	4,840,047	83.03		
Invalid/blank votes	989,169	16.97		
Total votes	5,829,216	100.00		
Registered voters/turnout	9,688,795	60.16		
Source: Nohlen, Cavuta

=== Chamber of Deputies ===
Party	Votes	%	Seats	+/–
Democratic Action	1,099,728	23.34	55	–42
Copei	1,065,512	22.62	53	–14
Radical Cause	974,190	20.68	40	+37
National Convergence	651,918	13.84	26	New
Movement for Socialism	509,068	10.81	24	–
Authentic Renewal Organization	41,085	0.87	1	–1
National Integration Movement	29,433	0.62	1	New
People's Electoral Movement	27,635	0.59	1	–1
Democratic Republican Union	26,299	0.56	1	–1
Communist Party of Venezuela	21,180	0.45	0	–1
New Democratic Generation	16,680	0.35	1	–5
National Opinion	13,725	0.29	0	–1
Formula 1	13,091	0.28	0	–2
Independent Popular Force	12,730	0.27	0	–
Emerging People	12,525	0.27	0	–
Community Development	10,541	0.22	0	–
Movement for Popular Democracy	9,680	0.21	0	–
Nationalist United Front	9,333	0.20	0	–
PCI	8,293	0.18	0	–
National Renewal Movement	8,223	0.17	0	–
Advanced Popular	7,754	0.16	0	–
GIRASOL	6,815	0.14	0	–
OCIM	6,685	0.14	0	–
Renewal	5,538	0.12	0	–
GP	5,459	0.12	0	–
Venezuelan Ecological Party	5,363	0.11	0	–
UVI	4,853	0.10	0	–
Active Democratic Nationalist Organisation	4,842	0.10	0	–
Socialist League	4,063	0.09	0	–
MELI	3,995	0.08	0	–
Community on the Move	3,558	0.08	0	–
Popular Democratic Force	3,409	0.07	0	–
Patriotic Union	3,341	0.07	0	–
CARICUAO DECIDE	2,957	0.06	0	–
Common Sense	2,915	0.06	0	–
New Order	2,759	0.06	0	–
The People to Power	2,546	0.05	0	–
FT	2,516	0.05	0	–
Democratic Factor	2,423	0.05	0	–
U	2,281	0.05	0	–
OI	2,232	0.05	0	–
National Party	2,059	0.04	0	–
Out of Love for Venezuela	1,999	0.04	0	–
Social Project	1,986	0.04	0	–
Democratic Organised Power of Renewal Structure	1,975	0.04	0	–
MACARIO	1,962	0.04	0	–
Integral Democratic Movement	1,910	0.04	0	–
UO	1,654	0.04	0	–
CUMANAGATOS	1,611	0.03	0	–
Electoral Renewal Integration	1,555	0.03	0	–
National Integration Front	1,495	0.03	0	–
FACTOR E	1,436	0.03	0	–
Guiding Venezuelan Spiritual Force	1,412	0.03	0	–
MRM	1,377	0.03	0	–
ASI	1,367	0.03	0	–
Republican Movement	1,229	0.03	0	–
Independent Nationalist Organisation	1,119	0.02	0	–
AGAIN	1,092	0.02	0	–
DE CHACAO 93	991	0.02	0	–
FIE	988	0.02	0	–
Union for Progress	978	0.02	0	–
MAR	975	0.02	0	–
Nationalist Civic Crusade	970	0.02	0	–
IDEAL	944	0.02	0	–
MONCHO	931	0.02	0	–
PND	929	0.02	0	–
Independent Action Force	914	0.02	0	–
NI	909	0.02	0	–
UCII	883	0.02	0	–
MIPO	855	0.02	0	–
CD	816	0.02	0	–
VO	814	0.02	0	–
Agricultural Action	800	0.02	0	–
M93	793	0.02	0	–
DCARA	766	0.02	0	–
GIO	755	0.02	0	–
Independents with Change	719	0.02	0	–
DECISION COJEDENA	719	0.02	0	–
TMSD	702	0.01	0	–
LIDER	669	0.01	0	–
Socialist Workers' Party	629	0.01	0	–
LSN	621	0.01	0	–
FURIA	613	0.01	0	–
UPC	548	0.01	0	–
DDP	536	0.01	0	–
Organised Independent Movement	518	0.01	0	–
VCI	506	0.01	0	–
MIAP	496	0.01	0	–
National Authentic Party	487	0.01	0	–
CPPP	443	0.01	0	–
PUNI	440	0.01	0	–
EREDE	409	0.01	0	–
ACONA	401	0.01	0	–
MDIPG	372	0.01	0	–
MOREPO 34	352	0.01	0	–
MRI	351	0.01	0	–
DAR	344	0.01	0	–
EEF 94	331	0.01	0	–
Majoritarian Independent Committee	319	0.01	0	–
MS	316	0.01	0	–
VIA	313	0.01	0	–
ISA	310	0.01	0	–
VIENE	308	0.01	0	–
Independent Solidarity	301	0.01	0	–
LVP	299	0.01	0	–
MIDV	296	0.01	0	–
GRITO VECINAL	278	0.01	0	–
New Republic	271	0.01	0	–
FIC	258	0.01	0	–
Independent Committee	251	0.01	0	–
MIL	247	0.01	0	–
AMIGOS DE ANZOATEC	240	0.01	0	–
PODER 7	237	0.01	0	–
PENSAMIENTO NACION	233	0.00	0	–
CRA	226	0.00	0	–
CRA	219	0.00	0	–
EPI	218	0.00	0	–
MIIDEA	207	0.00	0	–
REPO	203	0.00	0	–
CIPREA	202	0.00	0	–
MIRE	199	0.00	0	–
GEVE	198	0.00	0	–
GEIJM	196	0.00	0	–
MNVI	192	0.00	0	–
PINDD	191	0.00	0	–
MAP	188	0.00	0	–
RA	179	0.00	0	–
GAP	171	0.00	0	–
FIG	139	0.00	0	–
CIN	136	0.00	0	–
ORI	129	0.00	0	–
MDV	129	0.00	0	–
FUPSSB	122	0.00	0	–
PPIM	110	0.00	0	–
MINERO	102	0.00	0	–
ARDE	101	0.00	0	–
SOL	99	0.00	0	–
MPN	97	0.00	0	–
DCA	95	0.00	0	–
LVY	85	0.00	0	–
New Time	82	0.00	0	–
VEA	81	0.00	0	–
PEM	81	0.00	0	–
BP	80	0.00	0	–
MICA	74	0.00	0	–
EEE	74	0.00	0	–
MAI	69	0.00	0	–
PEIPP	58	0.00	0	–
MOPAIS	57	0.00	0	–
MALU	55	0.00	0	–
FEG	52	0.00	0	–
CADEM	43	0.00	0	–
CEMI	29	0.00	0	–
MEIAMA	24	0.00	0	–
MIPAYCA	23	0.00	0	–
FOVE	22	0.00	0	–
YIP	16	0.00	0	–
Apureño Independent Movement	11	0.00	0	–
OIPNR	10	0.00	0	–
MAICITO	10	0.00	0	–
OAP	9	0.00	0	–
CIV	8	0.00	0	–
MIIDEA	4	0.00	0	–
JL	4	0.00	0	–
AUV	3	0.00	0	–
Republican Democratic Party	1	0.00	0	–
Total	4,711,218	100.00	203	+2
Valid votes	4,711,218	80.82		
Invalid/blank votes	1,117,998	19.18		
Total votes	5,829,216	100.00		
Registered voters/turnout	9,688,795	60.16		
Source: Nohlen, Cavuta

== Aftermath ==
Andrés Velásquez of Radical Cause gained 22%, and "filed complaints of irregularities, saying that officials from his party were prevented from witnessing vote counting."
