= Luis Alberto Machado =

Venezuelan author and politician

Minister of Intellectual Development of Venezuela
- In office 1979–1984
- President: Luis Herrera Campins
- Preceded by: Created
- Succeeded by: Abolished

Secretary of the Presidency
- In office 1969–1974
- President: Rafael Caldera
- Preceded by: Manuel Mantilla
- Succeeded by: Ramón Escovar Salom

Deputy of the Congress of Venezuela
- In office 1964–1969

Personal details
- Born: 21 January 1932 Caracas, Venezuela
- Died: 23 February 2016 (aged 84)
- Occupation: Politician
- Profession: Lawyer

Luis Alberto Machado (21 January 1932 – 23 February 2016) was a Venezuelan lawyer, author, Secretary of the Presidency and Minister of Intellectual Development of Venezuela. He was best known for his ideas about the malleability of intelligence.

== Career ==
Machado served as Secretary of the Presidency during Rafael Caldera's first Presidency (1969-1974).

He asserted, in his books and writings on the subject, that perceived limits on intelligence are false and are primarily tied to upbringing and social conditioning. He argued that through careful environmental stimulation, especially in the early stages of child development, intelligence can be developed indefinitely and exponentially throughout life. As a politician, he stated that a nation's collective intellectual power was its greatest asset.

He was appointed Minister of Intellectual Development, a cabinet post created specifically for advancing and applying his ideas with government backing, during the presidency of Luis Herrera Campins (1979–1984). This program was known as the Intelligence Project, and, although given a small budget, resulted in a number of government initiatives aimed at improving educational opportunities in Venezuela.

The project was ended in 1984 by the government of president Jaime Lusinchi, but left behind a legacy in authors related to intelligence as Edward De Bono and his experience is cited by others as Martin Seligman, Howard Gardner and Robert Sternberg.

== Publications ==
- "UNIVERSAL GOAL" in Creating the Future: Perspectives on Educational Change. Compiled and Edited by Dee Dickinson.
- Context "It Can be Done". In Context.
