= Nationalist Civic Crusade =

Defunct Venezuelan political party

The Nationalist Civic Crusade (Spanish: Cruzada Civica Nacionalista; CCN) was a Venezuelan political party. It was established in 1965.

== History ==
CCN was formed by followers of former dictator Marcos Pérez Jiménez, under the leadership of P. Salas Castillo. They had a vaguely conservative outlook, although effectively had little ideology beyond personal allegiance to Pérez Jiménez, who also personally flirted with populism and Peronism.

The party first contested the 1968 election, winning 21 seats in the Chamber of Deputies and four in the Senate. Pérez Jiménez was elected to the Senate, although he was disqualified by the courts and an alternative CCN member took the seat instead.

Their vote fell in 1973 and they were eliminated from both houses in 1978. What support they had ebbed away as Pérez Jiménez, who went into voluntary exile in Spain, decided against returning to politics whilst attempts to sponsor his daughter as a presidential candidate also led to nothing.

The party disappeared but later returned to sponsor unsuccessful candidates in the 1988 and 1993 Presidential elections.
