= People's Electoral Movement (Venezuela) =

People's Electoral Movement Movimiento Electoral del Pueblo
- Founder: Luis Beltrán Prieto Figueroa
- Founded: 1967
- Split from: Democratic Action
- Ideology: Socialism; Left-wing nationalism National liberation
- Political position: Left-wing
- Regional affiliation: COPPPAL

The People's Electoral Movement (Movimiento Electoral del Pueblo, MEP) is a left-wing political party in Venezuela, founded in 1967 by Luis Beltrán Prieto Figueroa.

The MEP was founded after Prieto Figueroa won the 1967 Acción Democrática (AD) primary election, only to see his nomination overturned by the Romulo Betancourt faction, in favour of Gonzalo Barrios, considering Prieto too far left. Prieto Figueroa, at the time President of the Venezuelan Senate as well as President of AD, split from AD over the affair along with a substantial number of his supporters. Prieto Figueroa achieved 19% of the vote in the 1968 Venezuelan presidential election, coming fourth in a close election (Rafael Caldera won with 29%). However Prieto's subsequent electoral run, in the 1978 Venezuelan presidential election (the party endorsed Jesús Ángel Paz Galarraga in 1973), achieved only just over 1% of votes.

Prieto Figueroa led the party until his death in April 1993. At the December 1993 election it was part of the National Convergence coalition which successfully backed Rafael Caldera. The party supported Hugo Chávez from 1998 onwards, and in the legislative elections, 4 December 2005, the party won 11 out of 165 seats in the National Assembly.

== Presidential candidates supported ==
- 1968 election: Luis Beltrán Prieto Figueroa (19.34%)
- 1973 election: Jesús Ángel Paz Galarraga (5.07%)
- 1978 election: Luis Beltrán Prieto Figueroa (1.12%)
- 1983 election: José Vicente Rangel (3.34%)
- 1988 election: Edmundo Chirinos (0.79%)
- 1993 election: Rafael Caldera (30.5%)
- 1998 election: Hugo Chávez (56.2%)
- 2000 election: Hugo Chávez (59.8%)
- 2006 election: Hugo Chávez (62.8%)

== People's Electoral Movement ==
People's Electoral Movement- The Socialist Party of Venezuela (MEP) is a leftist political party that was founded on 10 December 1967. It was founded on the doctrines of socialist democracy, revolution, and nationalism. Its founders include Luis Beltran Prieto Figueroa, Jesús Ángel Paz Galárraga and Salom Mesa. In 2021, it had four representatives in the National Assembly- three deputies and an alternate. The three deputies are Gilberto Giménez, Ignacio Buznego, and Candelario Briceño. The alternate is Leticia Rangel.

== Ideology ==
The party was born as a left wing from the Venezuelan Populist Movement in 1967. In 1970, they adopted a clear socialist orientation, but they were hesitant in some aspects. This led to an evolution towards scientific socialism and the use of the dialectical method.

The political basis and ideologies of the party were declared by its founder, Luis Beltrán Preito Figueroa, in his thesis Del Tradicionalismo a la modernidad. This thesis is also known as Libro Morado.

The fundamental values of the MEP are:

- National Liberation- The MEP is an instrument to eradicate imperialist exploitation and oligarchy.
- Socialist Democracy- The MEP works to overcome contradictions and differences of the nation's classes and to further develop the human personality. Furthermore, Preito Figueroa expressed that socialist democracy means giving power to the working class as well as both manual and intellectual workers, who exercise control over the state and its means of production.

With regard to the economic aspect, Prieto Figueroa defended that social property should not be regulated in a bureaucratic or uniform matter. With this, it favored the nationalization of large companies, the creation of some self-managed units in medium and small companies, and an exception of a few small companies in private control for an indefinite amount of time. At the same time, he claimed that socialist democracy implied that they would create a plan for the economy to benefit the common good, and distribute wealth with regard to the work each individual completes. Similarly, Prieto Figueroa states that steps towards socialization are only taken when the state is under heavy influence by the power of the working class.

== History ==
The MEP was born from a leftist sector of Democratic Action (AD) in 1967 as a result of internal struggles in the party over the presidential elections. Because of this, the president of the AD, Luis Beltran Figueroa decided to retire from the organization along with many other notable leaders, such as Jesús Ángel Paz Galarraga. This signified the third division of the AD all within the decade, but the creation of the MEP is considered the most successful due to their leading figures and the powerful positions they achieved in the presidential and parliamentary elections of 1968. From the moment the MEP was created, leftist parties were divided. Some were still in a war against Raúl Leoni's government, while others preferred abstentionism. The Communist Party of Venezuela retired from this armed fight even though they didn't have the authority to participate under this name. Before this event, a leftist party emerged that proposed changes to a democratic socialist system and national liberation, which signified putting power in the hands of the working class and workers from both the city and the countryside. They also proposed that oil and basic industries become social property, while the state takes control over natural resources, education, basic health services, social security, and other similar entities.

Nicolás Maduro García, the father of Nicolás Maduro Muros (Venezuela's current president), was one of its founders.
