= Vladimir Gessen (jurist) =

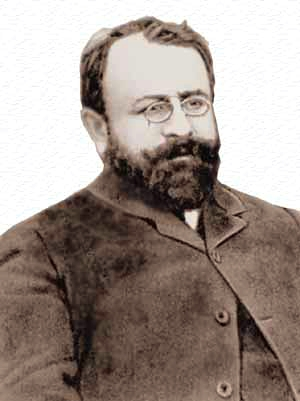
Vladimir Matveevich Gessen.

Vladimir Matveevich Gessen (Russian: Влади́мир Матве́евич Ге́ссен; 13 April [O.S. 1 April] 1868 – 14 January 1920) was a Russian jurist and politician. He was the country's first theoretician of constitutional law and was instrumental for the spread of the idea of constitutional, representative government in Russia.

== Career ==
Gessen taught constitutional and administrative law at the St. Petersburg Polytechnic Institute, edited the liberal journals Pravo and Vestnik Prava and served as a Constitutional Democrat representative to the Duma.

A proponent of natural law, Gessen's scholarly work was strongly influenced by German constitutional theory. He advocated the establishment of a representative democracy with checks and balances governed by the rule of law, and assigned particular importance to the guarantees of personal freedom and private property during the transition phase.
