= New Order (Venezuela) =

New Order Nuevo Orden
- Abbreviation: NOR
- Founder: Miguel Cevedo Marín
- Founded: 12 October 1974
- Dissolved: 2002
- Headquarters: Caracas
- Ideology: Nationalism; Anticommunism; Fascism; Neo-Nazism (After 1978)
- Political position: Far-right

The New Order (Spanish: Nuevo Orden, NOR) was a nationalist Venezuelan political party, with anticommunist and fascist tendencies that came from a student movement influenced by the authoritarian ideas of former Venezuelan president Marcos Evangelista Pérez Jiménez. The movement originated from the Universidad Central de Venezuela (Central University of Venezuela) being originally called the Frente Nacionalista (Nationalist front) until it integrated itself into the Frente Unido Nacionalistia (United Nationalist Front) in 1973 before splitting from the party a few years before the elections of that year. It was founded as a national party in Caracas on 12 January 1974 where it established the title Nuevo Orden. It was first led by Miguel Cevedo Marín until Félix Díaz Ortega became the leader of the organization in 1978 who shifted the party closer into Neo-Nazism.

== History ==
=== Elections ===
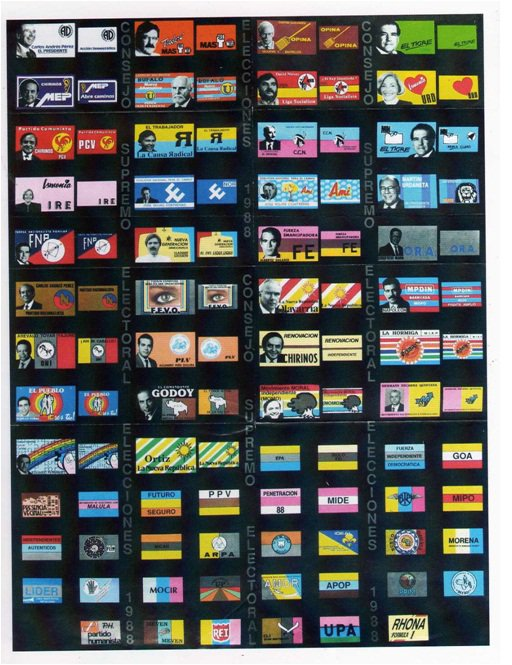
1988 Venezuelan ballots showing the Nuevo Orden party participating on the fourth row, second column.

Its national headquarters was located in Schaffer Street in the Buena Vista Sector of Petare, Caracas, where it participated in multiple student, union, social, and humanitarian projects among the population, especially the elderly diabetics. The party had a presence in more than 15 states, with its strongest bastions in Caracas, Miranda, Delta Amacuro, Yaracuy, Falcón, Carabobo, and Lara.

The party participated in several national and regional electoral elections immediately after its split from the Frente Unido Nacionalista. Beginning in 1973, the party established itself as a national party however, since it was established after the presidential nominations it was not able to participate in the elections of that year. It's important to note that even though the party only achieved a some hundred votes in 1973, in 1974, NOR was able to achieve more than 10,000 votes in the regional elections, which became the highest votes in the party's whole history. In 1978, the party (led by Miguel Cevedo Marín at the time) postulated the presidential candidate for the bipartisan party, the Acción Democrática however, Félix Díaz Ortega, who was not a member of the party of the time, instigated a change in support for the other bipartisan party, Copei. Félix Díaz Ortega soon became leader of the party.

In the 1988 elections, the party presented José de la Trinidad Rojas Contreras as a candidate for the presidency under the Coalición Nacional para el Cambio (National coalition for change) together with the Araguaney Independent Movement. In 1992, the party obtained enough votes to access the newly created municipality of Chacao in Caracas, but their rights were denied by the then current government. From the 1993 elections and the years following, Félix Díaz Ortega presented himself as presidential candidate but always achieved poor results. in 2001, Félix Díaz Ortega organized with other opposition movements towards the government of Hugo Chávez, pickets signs that read "Out with Communism in the barracks!" In 2002 however, the dissolution of the party was decided by the administrative resolution of the National Electoral Council and the party ceased to exist.

=== Association ===
NOR always had strengthened its ties with the Spanish fascist FET y de las JONs political party and with the Spanish Fuerza Nueva party after during Spain's transition to democracy. In 1995 when the French politician and National Front leader, Jean-Marie Le Pen, went on to become the third political force in the country, New Order strengthened ties with the French National Front.

NOR militant bases were varied, from nostalgic followers of the former president Marcos Pérez Jiménez, to supporters of the New Right, or Neo-Nazis. The Tel Aviv University accused Nuevo Orden in 1997 of instigating antisemitic propaganda in Caracas because of graffiti that read "I have a crematorium in my pocket" and "Death to the Jews."

== Programme ==
The party's ambitions were summarized in 25 points of action aimed at developing a hypothetical government:

1. Increased participation in all levels of government.
2. Implementation of the Federal system.
3. Country's return to the borders of 1811.
4. Apply an agrarian reform, to make Venezuela an agricultural powerhouse.
5. Progressive Savings nonrenewable natural resources and rational use of national resources.
6. National Housing Plan, pretending away the housing crisis in a span of 20 years.
7. Free and compulsory education for all under 18.
8. Public Administration Reform under criterion: Austerity in the management and investment liberality.
9. Reorientation of the national economy in the interests of the majority. Enforce social function to private and public capital.
10. Demographic territorial reorganization and rationalization of immigration.
11. Implementation of a Social Security System that protects the individual before birth and even after death.
12. Amendment to the Constitution of 1961, in terms of economic rights.
13. Mandatory Military Service.
14. Election by competition in all branches of the judiciary, to avoid layoffs for political reasons or unjustified.
15. Creation of the National Police and regional police forces.
16. Pass a comprehensive defense bill Homeland.
17. Independent foreign policy against the interests of other countries.
18. Elimination of monopolies and oligopolies official or private.
19. Ensuring absolute freedom of speech, trade, profession and industry no limitations other than the common good.
20. National policy on public transport with private participation, users and regional and national government.
21. Construction of a railway network of 50,000 km.
22. Mandatory work or study for anyone aged 16 years and under 60 years.
23. Progressive elimination of privileges and official reliefs of some sectors of the country.
24. Establishment of multidimensional democratic system, capable of providing political democracy, social and economic the country.

== Electoral Results ==
Year	Candidate	Number of votes	Percent of votes	Position
1983	Félix Díaz Ortega	1,610	0.02%	Eleventh
1988	José Rojas Contreras	1,251	0.02%	Nineteenth
1993	Félix Díaz Ortega	780	0.01%	Seventeenth
