= Radical Cause =

Political party in Venezuela

The Radical Cause La Causa Radical
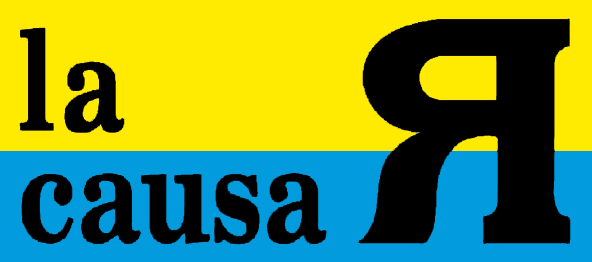
- Leader: Andrés Velásquez
- President: José Ignacio Guédez
- Mayor of Ciudad Bolivar: Victor Fuenmayor
- Founded: 1971
- Split from: Communist Party of Venezuela
- Ideology: Democratic socialism Labourism; Radicalism
- Political position: Center-left
- National affiliation: Unitary Platform
- Colors: Blue and yellow
- Seats in the National Assembly: 0 / 277
- Seats in the Latin American Parliament: 0 / 12
- Governors of States of Venezuela: 0 / 23
- Mayors: 2 / 337

Website
- lacausarbolivar.com

The Radical Cause (Spanish: La Causa Radical, LCR), stylized as La Causa Я, is a minor left-wing political party in Venezuela, and today part of the Venezuelan opposition to president Nicolás Maduro.

At its peak in the early 1990s, the party came within touching distance of winning the 1993 presidential elections. However, the party split in 1997 when a number of members left to form Patria Para Todos, now part of the pro-government Great Patriotic Pole (GPP) electoral alliance. LCR has now lost much of its national profile, but retains some influence in its home region of Guayana.

== History ==
=== Early history ===
LCR was founded in 1971 by es:Alfredo Maneiro, an intellectual and former guerrilla who had been expelled from the Communist Party of Venezuela. The new revolutionary socialist party grew quickly, benefiting from the collapse of the Communist Party.

Throughout the 1970s and 1980s, the party focused on organizing factory workers in the Guayana region of Bolivar state through the so-called Matanceros Movement, as well as workers on the west side of Caracas, Catia, Caracas and Catia. The party gained control of the leadership of the SUTISS metalworkers' union at SIDOR, the largest steel company in Venezuela.

Maneiro's premature death, caused by a heart attack in 1982, left the party's leadership in the hands of the young labor activists he had trained.

=== Electoral challenges ===
With the 1989 introduction of elections for local and regional offices, LCR had its first opportunity to compete electorally with a chance of success. In December 1988, LCR sent three deputies to the Venezuelan Chamber of Deputies. In 1989, one of LCR's leaders, Andrés Velásquez, became the first Venezuelan elected governor who did not belong to either of the two major political parties (Accion Democratica and COPEI), winning the Bolívar governorship on the LCR ticket.

In the 1992 local elections, Aristóbulo Istúriz was elected mayor of Caracas for LCR, where he initiated processes of citizen participation which, although canceled after his term ended in 1995, would later influence the Bolivarian Revolution.

In the 1993 presidential elections, the party nominated Andrés Velásquez as its candidate. Velásquez finished in fourth place with 22%, according to the official results, close to winning candidate Rafael Caldera's 30.5%. However, Velásquez and his party alleged that electoral fraud had taken place and that he had actually come in second place.

Francisco Arias Cárdenas, one of the main co-conspirators in Hugo Chávez's 1992 coup attempt, later joined LCR and was elected Governor of Zulia State.

=== Split ===
In 1997, the party split into two factions, a radical faction led by Pablo Medina, Aristóbulo Istúriz and Alí Rodríguez Araque and a moderate faction led by Andrés Velásquez. The radical faction, which was favored by a majority of party members, left to found a new party Patria Para Todos (PPT) and went on to support Hugo Chávez's candidacy for the presidency the following year.

After losing a majority of its members, LCR's influence was diminished. It retained its name, moderated its radical ideology, and later went into opposition to the Chávez government. The party remained strongly opposed to the Chávez government, joining the Coordinadora Democrática in 2002, supporting Manuel Rosales in the 2006 presidential elections, and opposing the 2007 proposed constitutional reform.

The party won four seats in the 2000 Venezuelan general election, but lost them all four years later. In the 2008 Venezuelan regional elections, held on November 23, Andrés Velásquez narrowly failed in his bid to win the Bolívar State governorship once again, due to splits within the opposition. LCR's Victor Fuenmayor was elected mayor of the state's second largest city, Ciudad Bolívar, the party's best result in the election. The party earned less than 1% of the nationwide vote for the various governorships.
