= Vladimir Gessen (Venezuelan politician) =

Venezuelan politician and psychologist

Vladimir Augusto Gessen Rodríguez is a Venezuelan politician, journalist and psychologist.

== Career ==
He graduated as a licentiate in psychology from Central University of Venezuela, Caracas with a degree in industrial psychology, completed postgraduate in clinical psychopathology from the University of Barcelona, Spain and received a Doctor Honoris Causa from the Bicentenary University of Aragua. He has done Master's studies in social sciences at the Florida International University and FLACSO.

== Communicator ==
After stepping away from politics, he focused on his career as a psychologist. He has been active in Venezuelan media, hosting psychology programs on radio and television with his wife, María Mercedes, such as “El Diván de los Gessen,” “Qué Cosas tiene la Vida,” and “Cita con los Psicólogos.” The couple also writes psychological columns for national and international press under titles like “Psicología para Todos” and “Psico&Salud.” They run and produce websites like psicologiaparatodos.com and existeypiensa.com. Together, they have authored books including Maestría de la Felicidad!, Qué cosas y cambios tiene la Vida, Ser Feliz en Pareja, Psicología para todos, and ¿Quién es El Universo?.

He has appeared as a political analyst on CNN en Español and held executive roles in the private sector as Vice President of Empresas 1BC (RCTV) and RCTV International, where he produced and hosted his own radio and TV programs, including the aforementioned psychology shows and “Viva la política,” an interview-based talk show. His articles have been featured on platforms like Informe21.com, El Diario de Caracas, and Firmas Press, which distribute them for publication in various Hispanic media outlets. He also produced “El Informe Gessen” for both the web and Mega TV.

He is an active member of the National Association of Hispanic Journalists (NAHJ), the Inter American Press Association (IAPA), and the founding President of the Digital Press Block of Venezuela.

== Public Activity ==
He entered politics by joining Renny Ottolina's Movimiento de Integridad Nacional. After Ottolina's death in 1978, he founded his own conservative party, Nueva Generación Democrática, which secured parliamentary representation with senators and deputies. He ran for President of Venezuela in the 1988 general elections.

He served as Plenipotentiary Minister and Ambassador of Venezuela to Canada, Minister of State for Tourism, a member of the Presidential Cabinet, and President of the Venezuelan Tourism Corporation. He was also the founding President of the Venezuela-U.S. Binational Commission for Tourism Development and Cooperation. From 1989 to 1994, he was a Congressman for the Carabobo State and the Federal District, presiding over the Permanent Commission Against Drug Abuse and serving as a principal member on committees for Interior Policy, Defense, and Finance.

Earlier, he was a Congressman for Carabobo (1984–1989), presiding over the Subcommission on Drug Control and contributing to other major committees on youth, environment, media, and indigenous affairs, among others. In 1990, he left politics but briefly returned in 1999 to run for the National Constituent Assembly, advocating for the protection of women, families, and youth. He is the founding President of the Fundación Venezuela Libre de Drogas and Fundación Venezuela Nuestra.

== Honors Decorations ==
Order of the Liberator, Grand Cordon, for “services rendered to humanity,” the highest honor awarded by Venezuela. Order Francisco de Miranda, First Class, for “public service to the nation.” Order Andrés Bello, for “promoting a drug-free culture, family values, and educational content in media.” Order Antonio Ornés Rodríguez, First Category, for contributions to foreign policy and national development. Honor of Merit, Grand Cordon of the Federal District, for his “outstanding public service.” Journalist Day Order from the Mayor of Chacao, recognizing professional contributions to Venezuela. Order Francisco Esteban Gómez, First Class, for tourism development. Honorary mention Cesar Naranjo Ostty, for dedication to combating drug issues. Good Citizen Order from Los Salias Municipality for contributions to scientific communication. Order Vicente Emilio Sojo, First Class, for civic achievements. Tourism Merit Order from Anzoátegui State. Honorary mention from Instituto Educativo Gonzalo Méndez. Honor of Merit from the Fundación Social de la Tercera Edad. Awards:

Meridiano de Oro (1995), Best Opinion Program. Monseñor Pellín Award (1996), Person of the Year. Recognition by the Federation of Psychologists’ Colleges (1996). CECODAP (UNICEF) Award (1997), for defending children’s rights. Casa del Artista Award (1995), nominated for Announcer of the Year. See Also Movimiento de Integridad Nacional-Unidad VIII Legislatura del Congreso Nacional de Venezuela References [[Category Doctors]] [[Category Psychologists]] [[Category of Contemporary Venezuela]] [[Category Ministers of Tourism]] [[Category Ambassadors to Canada]] [[Category TV Presenters]] [[Category Journalists]] [[Category University of Venezuela Alumni]] [[Category during Carlos Andrés Pérez's presidencies]] [[Category of the Liberator]] [[Category Francisco de Miranda]] [[Category Andrés Bello]] [[Category Presidential Candidates]] [[Category of the VII National Congress of Venezuela]] [[Category of the VIII National Congress of Venezuela]].
