= Democratic Action (Venezuela) =

Political party in Venezuela

Democratic Action Acción Democrática
- President: Isabel Carmona de Serra (de jure); Rubén Antonio Limas Telles (de facto)
- General Secretary: Henry Ramos Allup (de jure); José Bernabé Gutiérrez (de facto)
- Founder: Rómulo Betancourt
- Founded: 13 September 1941; 85 years ago
- Headquarters: La Florida, Caracas, Venezuela
- Ideology: Social democracy Left-wing nationalism Progressivism; Historical: Socialism
- Political position: Centre-left
- National affiliation: None (de facto); Unitary Platform (de jure)
- International affiliation: Socialist International
- Regional affiliation: COPPPAL
- Colors: White (official)
- National Assembly: 8 / 285
- Governors: 1 / 23
- State legislatures: 17 / 237
- Mayors: 0 / 335

Party flag
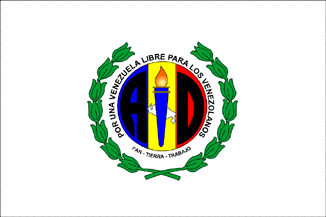

Website
- ademocratica.com

Democratic Action (Spanish: Acción Democrática, AD) is a Venezuelan social democratic and centre-left political party established in 1941. The party played an important role in the early years of Venezuelan democracy, leading the government during Venezuela's first democratic period (1945–1948). A decade of dictatorship under Marcos Pérez Jiménez followed, which saw AD excluded from power. With the advent of democracy in 1958, four Presidents of Venezuela came from Acción Democrática from the 1950s to the 1990s during the two-party period with COPEI.

Since 2000, the party's general secretary has been Henry Ramos Allup. In the 2015 Venezuelan parliamentary election, AD backed the opposition electoral alliance Democratic Unity Roundtable (MUD), which managed to grasp a supermajority. AD won 26 constituency representatives out of 167 seats in the unicameral National Assembly, making it the second-largest party in opposition to Nicolás Maduro. In July 2018, AD left the Democratic Unity Roundtable opposition coalition.

== History ==
=== Early years: 1931–1958 ===
The party had a chaotic early history. The Agrupación Revolucionaria de Izquierda (ARDI) was founded in 1931 in Colombia by Rómulo Betancourt and other exiled Venezuelans. In 1936 this became the Movimiento de Organización Venezolana (ORVE), which was then dissolved into the Partido Democrático Nacional (PDN). Finally, in 1941, after Isaías Medina Angarita legalized all political parties in Venezuela, Acción Democrática was founded by Betancourt and others. These included Rómulo Gallegos, Andrés Eloy Blanco, Luis Beltrán Prieto, Juan Oropeza, Luis Lander, Raúl Ramos Jiménez, Medardo Medina Febres, Enrique H. Marín, Rafael Padrón, Fernando Peñalver, Luis Augusto Dubuc, César Hernández, José Manuel "el mocho" Hernández and Ricardo Montilla. Gallegos was a highly prestigious writer, author of the iconic novel, Doña Bárbara (1929), while Eloy Blanco was a celebrated Venezuelan poet and witty humorist.

After the October 1945 revolution, Betancourt was President of Venezuela until Rómulo Gallegos won the 1947 election, generally believed to be the first free and fair elections in Venezuelan history. The party won a vast majority of seats in the municipal elections the following year. Gallegos governed until being overthrown in the 1948 Venezuelan coup d'état. The 1945–48 period is known as the trienio. Many of AD's founders and early members went into exile during the subsequent dictatorship of Marcos Pérez Jiménez, and returned for the restoration of democracy in 1958.

=== Political dominance: 1958–1999 ===
After the restoration of democracy, AD joined the 1958 Puntofijo Pact, initiating a forty-year period of two-party dominance by AD and COPEI. Betancourt won the 1958 election, and Raúl Leoni won the following 1963 elections. AD also won in 1973 (Carlos Andrés Pérez), 1983 (Jaime Lusinchi), and 1988 (Carlos Andrés Pérez again). From 1958 to 1999, AD's candidates only lost four out of nine presidential elections (two to COPEI, in 1968 and 1978, two to third-party candidates in 1993 and 1998), and one of those occurred during a major split in AD.

==== Splits ====
The 1968 presidential election was shaped by the internal split of Democratic Action, with a substantial leftist faction breaking away to form the Movimiento Electoral del Pueblo (MEP). The split was the result of Luis Beltrán Prieto Figueroa's victory in the 1967 AD primary election, only to see his nomination overturned by the party's reformist social democrat faction (led by Betancourt) in favor of Gonzalo Barrios, with the Betancourt faction considering Prieto too far left.

Prieto Figueroa, at the time President of the Venezuelan Senate as well as President of AD, split from AD over the affair along with a substantial number of his supporters. The result was that the 1968 election marked AD's first-ever electoral loss, when COPEI's Rafael Caldera won the Presidency with less than 30% of the vote, just ahead of AD's Barrios. Prieto Figueroa attained nearly 20%, attaining fourth place behind the Unión Republicana Democrática's Miguel Ángel Burelli Rivas.

An earlier split, in 1960, saw the Revolutionary Left Movement break away from AD. Its subsequent engagement in armed struggle against the government meant the split posed less of a partisan problem compared the later MEP split.

=== Chávez/Maduro era: 1999–present ===
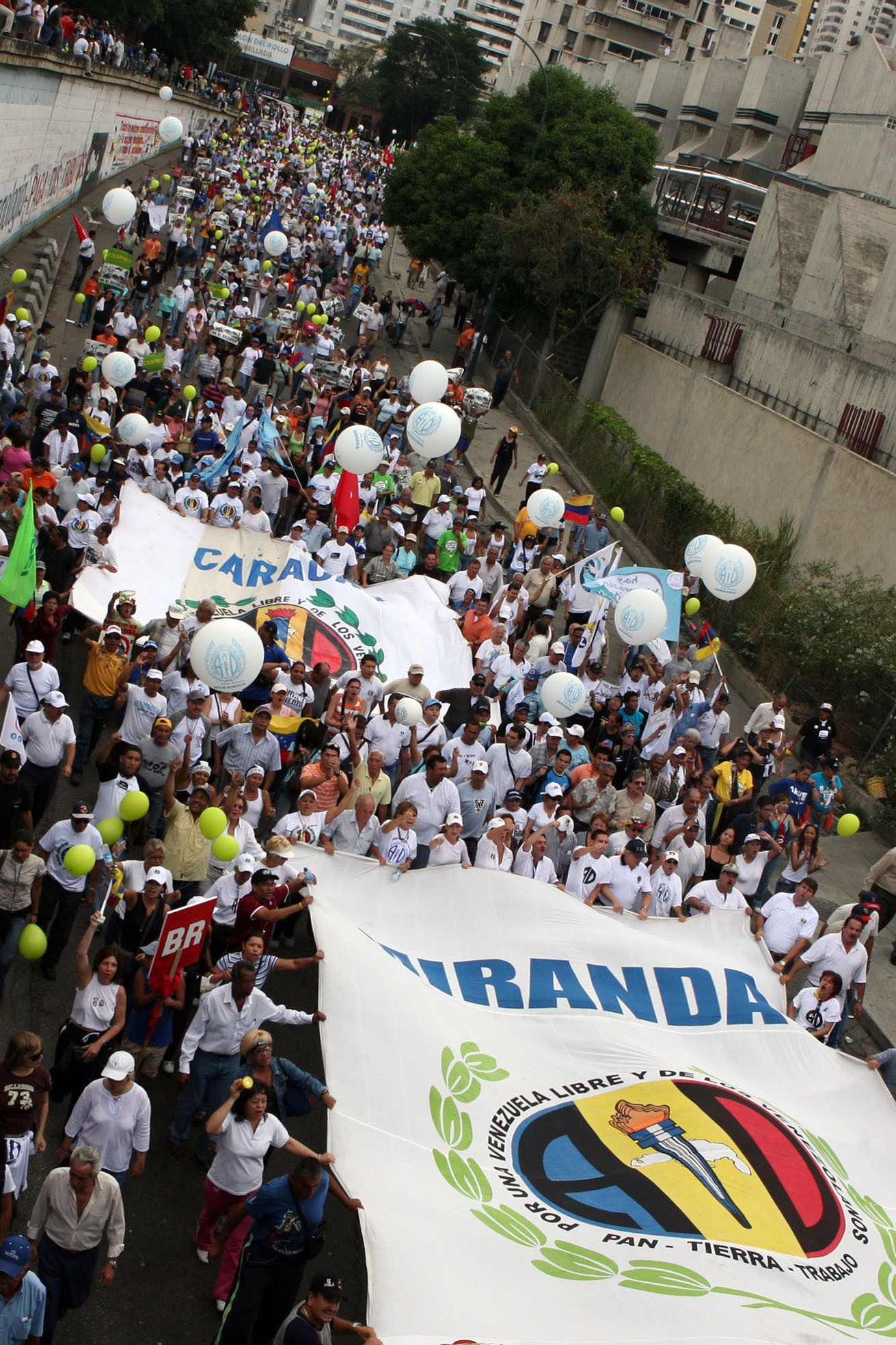
AD posters during a rally in support of RCTV in 2007

The Puntofijo Pact and AD-COPEI duopoly over Venezuelan politics collapsed in the early 1990s in the face of a severe economic and political crisis, culminating in the impeachment of AD member and President Carlos Andrés Pérez for corruption and the 1993 election of former COPEI leader Rafael Caldera on a National Convergence coalition platform. Caldera's failure to resolve the economic crisis created the political environment for the 1998 election of Hugo Chávez. In the 2000 elections for the new National Assembly of Venezuela, AD won 29 out of 165 seats; four additional seats were won by an AD-COPEI alliance. At the 2005 legislative elections Democratic Action staged an electoral boycott and consequently did not win any seats.

During the 2010 and 2015 elections, AD was part of the Democratic Unity Roundtable. In the 2015 elections where the Roundtable won the National Assembly in a 109-seat majority, AD won 25 seats. The Roundtable parties boycotted the 2017 elections to the Constituent Assembly and participated in an unofficial referendum against its formation. In July 2018, AD left the Democratic Unity Roundtable, citing "operative problems inside the organization" and difficulties in electing the new secretary general of the coalition.

Acción Democrática's Secretary General is Henry Ramos Allup. The trade union confederation CTV is closely linked to AD. AD is a member of the Socialist International, and a member of COPPPAL.

== Venezuelan Presidents from AD ==
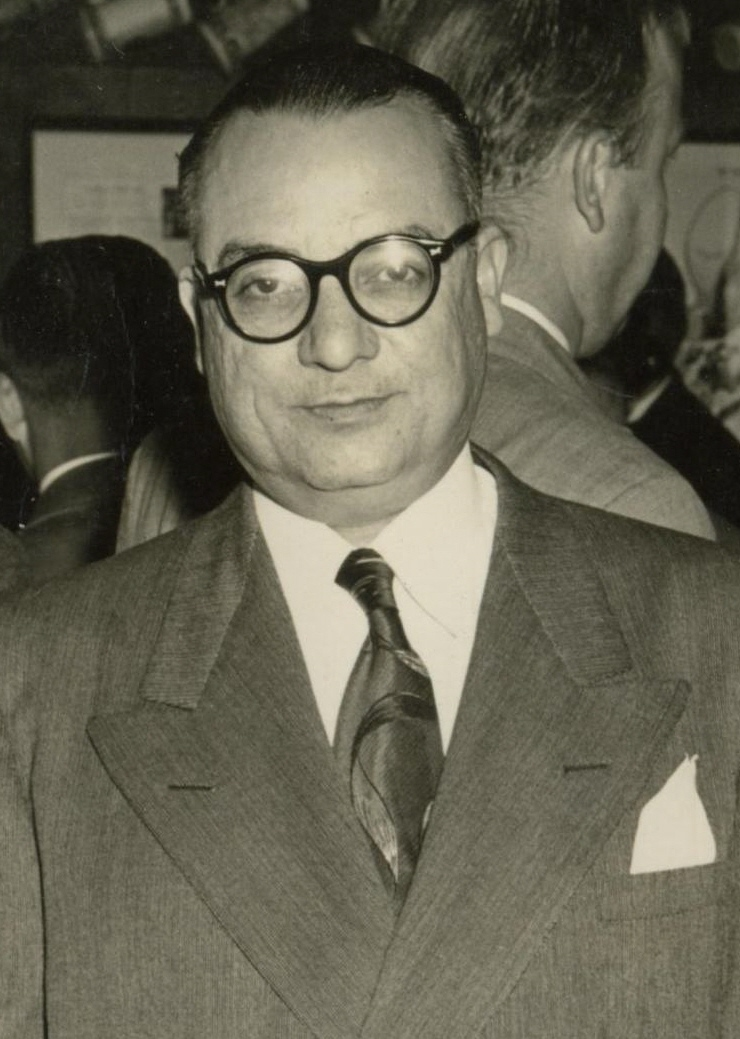
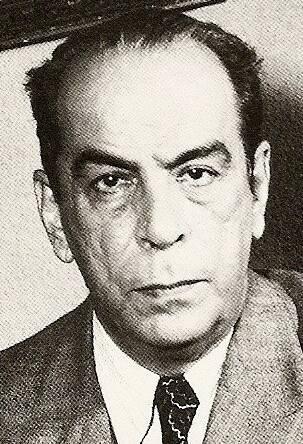
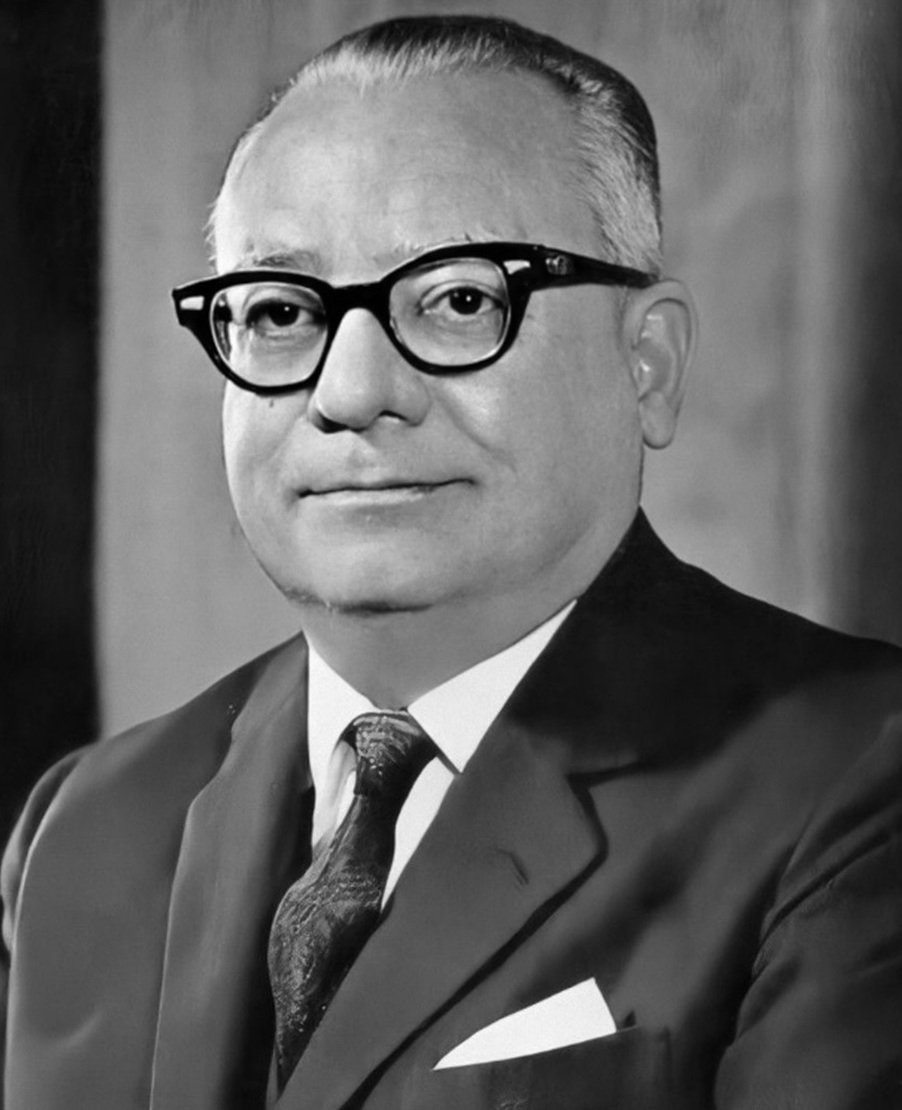
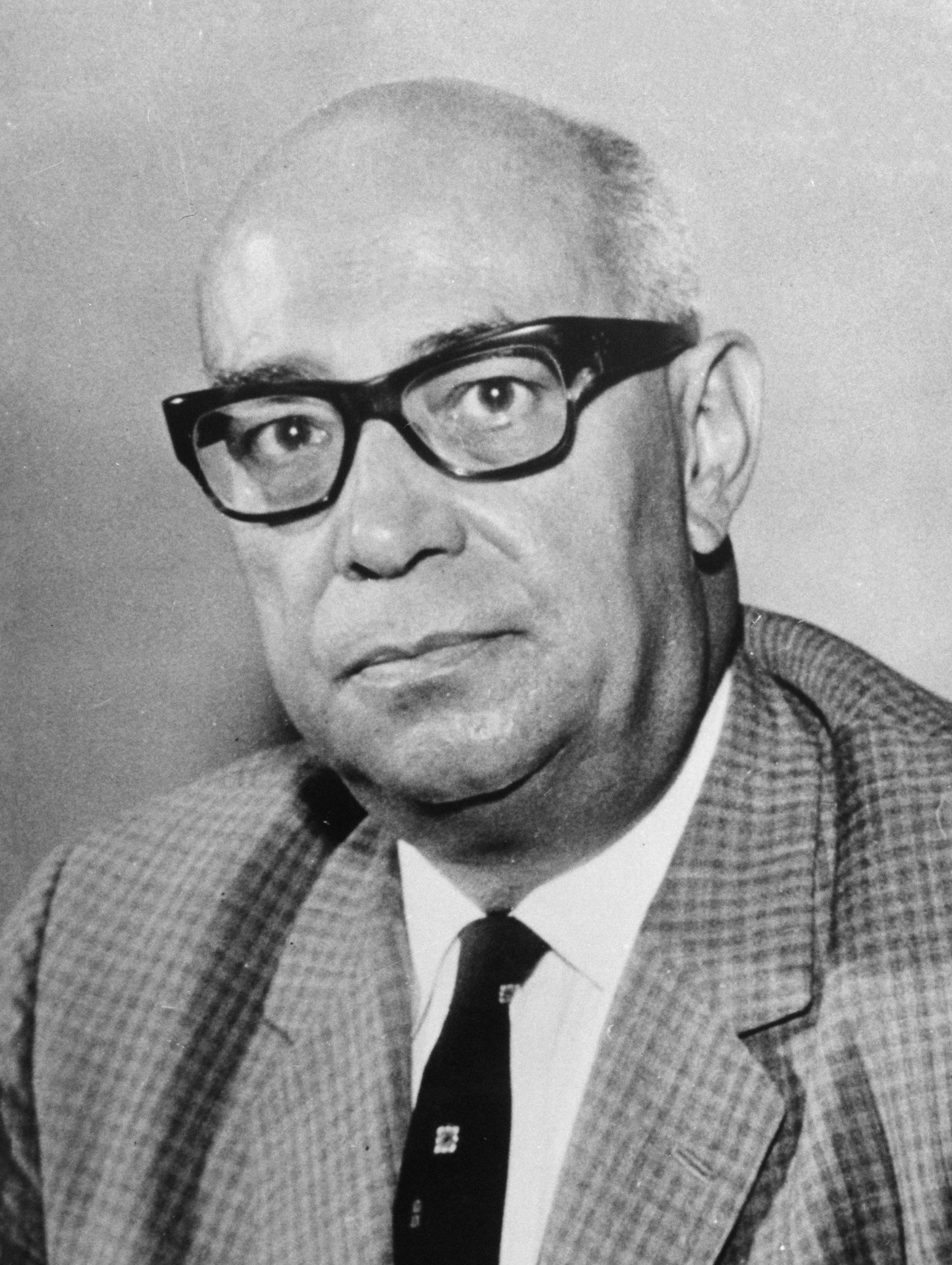
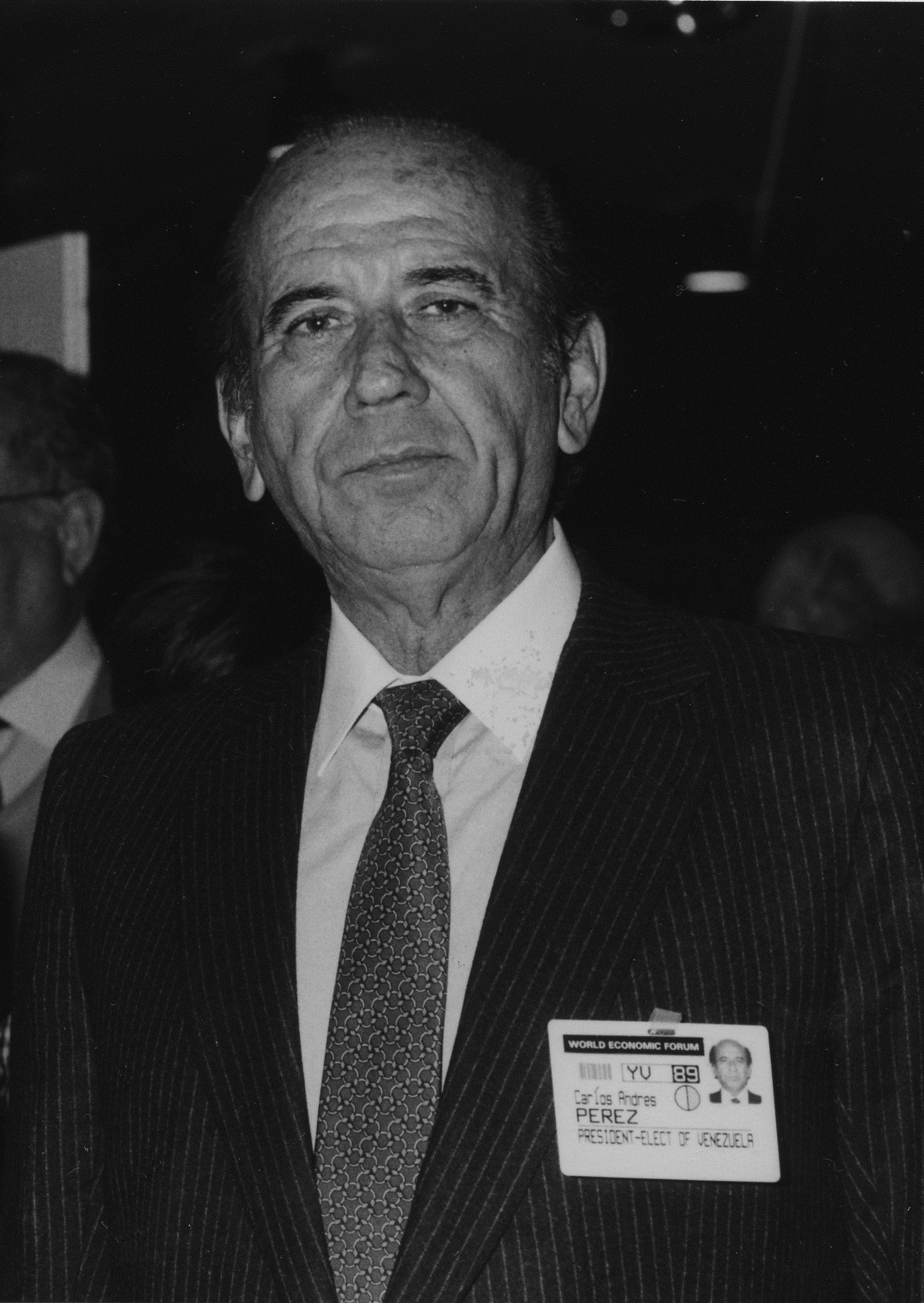
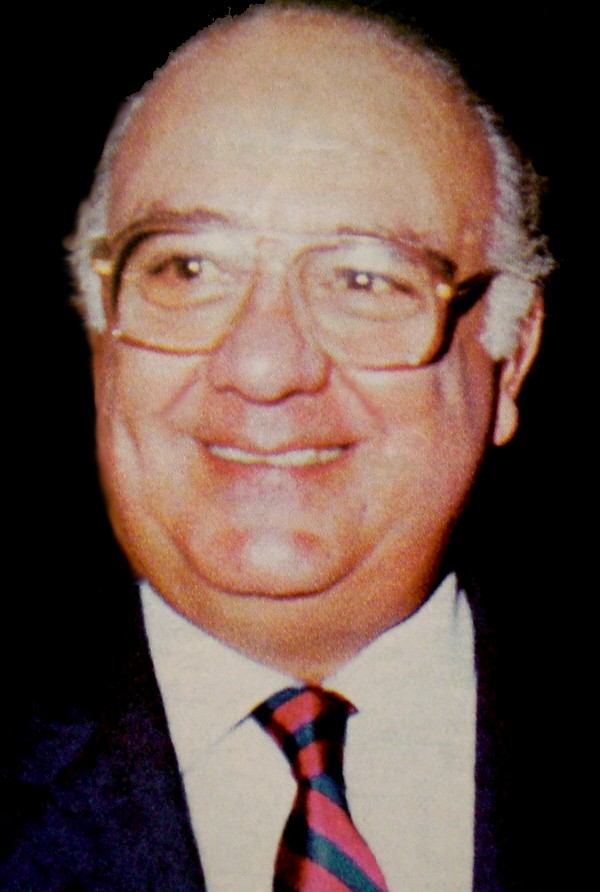
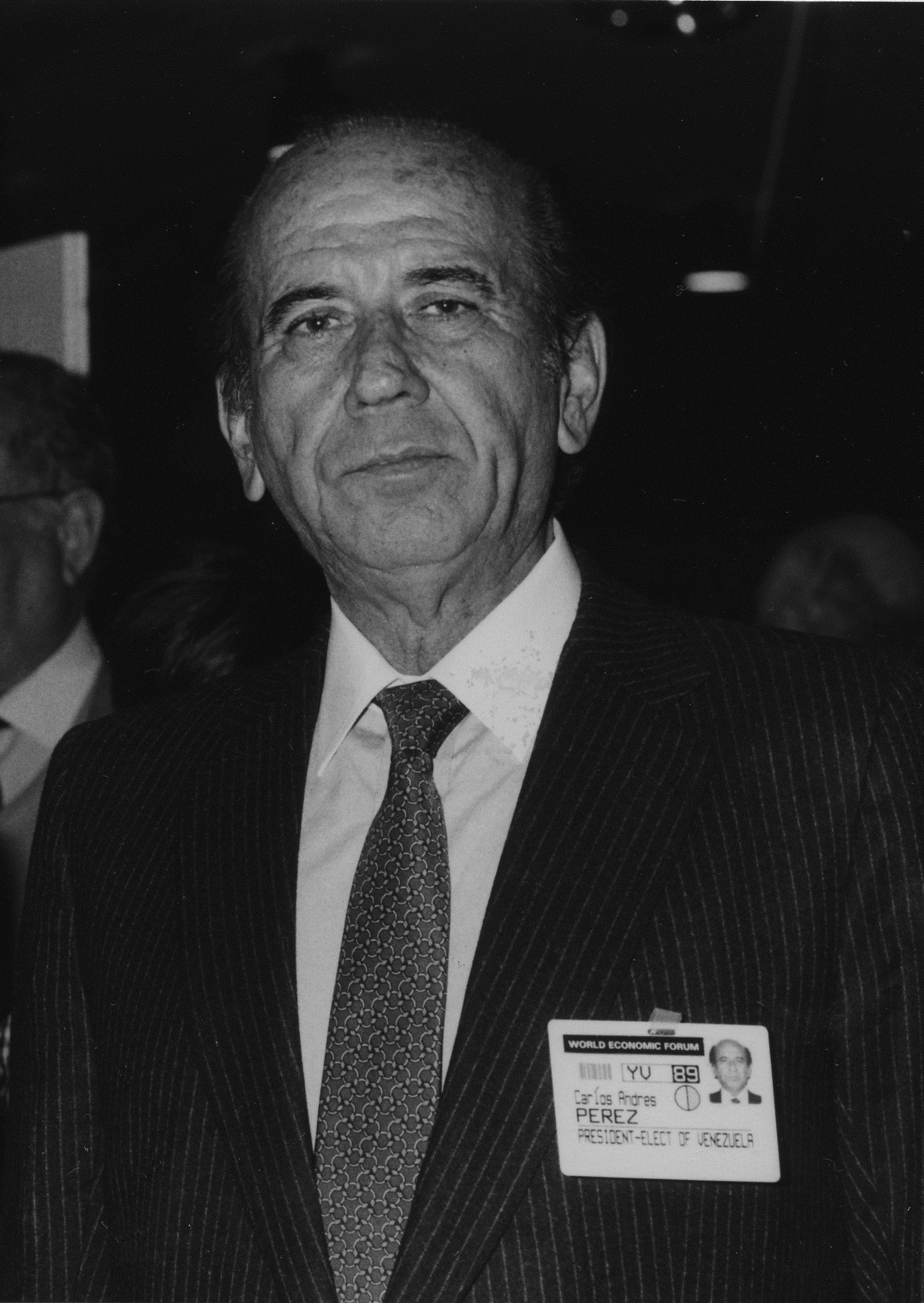
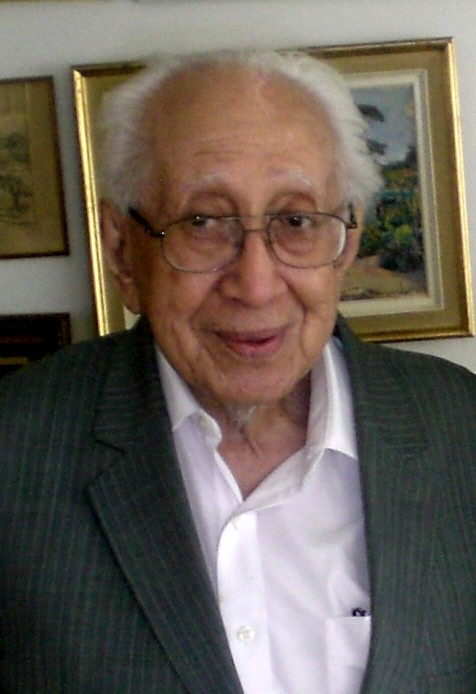
President	Term	Form of entry	Occupation
Rómulo Betancourt	1945–1948	Coup d'état	Politician
Rómulo Gallegos	1948	Direct elections	Novelist
Rómulo Betancourt	1959–1964	Direct elections	Politician
Raúl Leoni	1964–1969	Direct elections	Lawyer
Carlos Andrés Pérez	1974–1979	Direct elections	Politician
Jaime Lusinchi	1984–1989	Direct elections	Physician
Carlos Andrés Pérez	1989–1993	Direct elections	Politician
Ramón José Velásquez	1993–1994	Interim president	Historian

== See also ==
- List of political parties in Venezuela
- Interventions of political parties in Venezuela
