= Interim government of Pedro Carmona =

Government of Pedro Carmona
- Interim Government in Venezuela
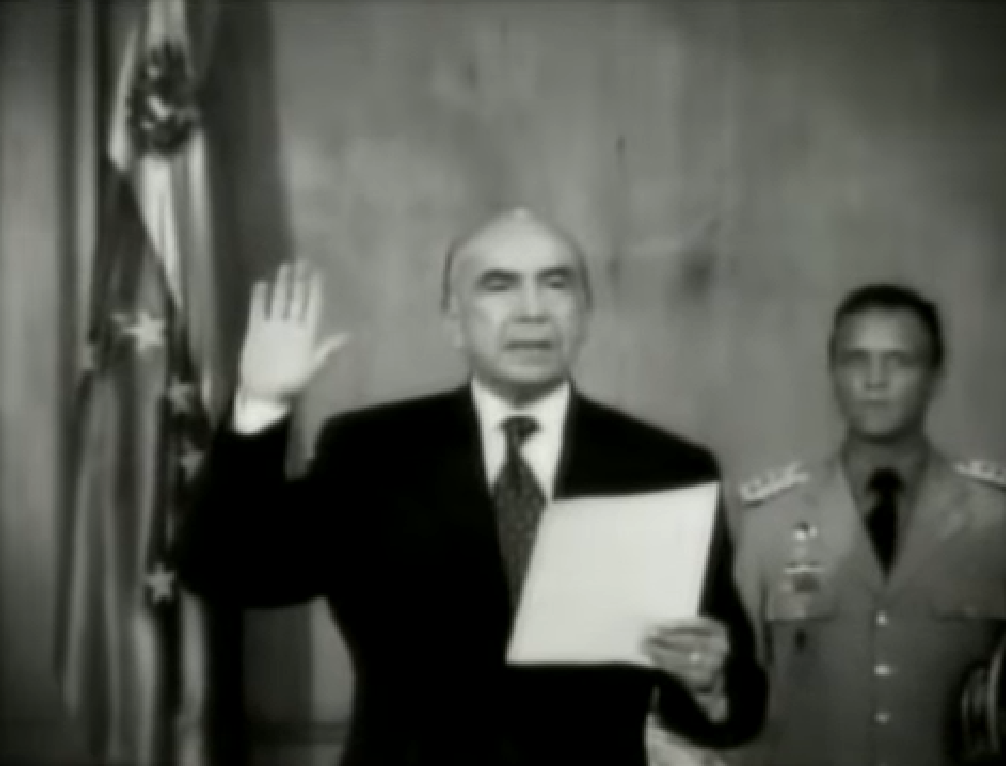
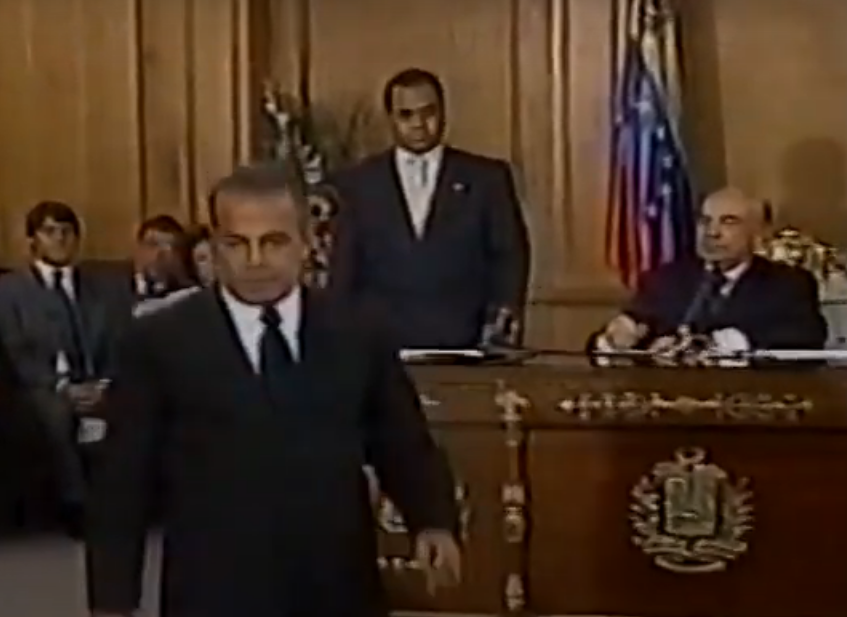
- Formation: April 12, 2002
- Extinction: April 13, 2002
- Country: Venezuela

Executive branch
- Pedro Carmona: Acting President

The Government of Pedro Carmona was the de facto government installed after the overthrow of Hugo Chávez in 2002.

The Act Constituting the Government of Democratic Transition and National Unity was promulgated, which dissolved the national public powers and concentrated all power in Carmona.

Carmona's government was recognized by Colombia, El Salvador, Spain and the United States. It was not recognized by Argentina and Cuba.

== Domestic policy ==
The Act Constituting the Government of Democratic Transition and National Unity (Spanish: Acta de Constitución del Gobierno de Transición Democrática y Unidad Nacional), known colloquially as the "Carmona Decree" or El Carmonazo, was a document drawn up on 12 April 2002 the day following the 2002 Venezuelan coup attempt, which attempted to oust President Hugo Chávez. This Act established a transitional government, dissolving the National Assembly and the Supreme Court, and also suspending the Attorney General, Comptroller General, governors, and mayors elected during Chávez's administration.

== Reactions ==
=== Domestic ===
Hugo Chávez had described Carmona as "straightforward and low-key – until schemers manipulated him".

=== Foreign ===
Andrés Pastrana in Colombia called Pedro Carmona to offer him "the full support and express solidarity of the Colombian people in this transition process". El Salvador also recognized him as the legitimate president as did the Bush administration in the United States, which blamed Hugo Chávez for the events, considering that Chávez had resigned and therefore Carmona's assumption of power could not be a coup d'état. The International Monetary Fund (IMF) was the first financial institution to recognize Carmona as president of Venezuela and offer him its collaboration.

The government of José María Aznar of Spain granted recognition to Carmona as "new president," instructing the ambassador in Venezuela to meet with the U.S. ambassador and with Carmona.

The government of Ricardo Lagos in Chile took an ambivalent position, along with the government of Vicente Fox in Mexico, which declared that it would "abstain from recognizing or not" Carmona, maintaining diplomatic relations between both countries. The president of Peru, Alejandro Toledo, declared that "it would be untimely and inappropriate to say whether it was a coup d'état" because "the information is still very fragmented."

The interim president of Argentina, Eduardo Duhalde, defined Chávez's ouster as a "coup d'état" and the attitude of the new Carmona government as "typical of a dictatorship." The Minister of Foreign Affairs of Cuba, Felipe Pérez Roque, demanded the return of the authorities "democratically elected by the people."

=== Press ===
Carmona, described by The Miami Herald as "president for a day" told the newspaper that his acceptance of that position was, in the Herald's paraphrase, "as a spontaneous act of bravery, not the result of a monthslong conspiracy". "I was not involved in any conspiracy", Carmona said. "I cannot accept any conjecture or soap operas. I categorically deny it."

The Chicago Tribune said Carmona was "a buttoned-down businessman and economist who has degrees from Caracas' Andres Bello Catholic University and the University of Brussels" and who "has an international reputation, having represented Venezuelan commercial and diplomatic missions abroad".

Describing Carmona as "a bookish economist" who had worked with the Foreign Ministry and "run a variety of trade associations", The Washington Post said that one reason he was chosen as interim president "was that he was one of the few people who didn't want the job". One condition imposed by the coup-makers was that the interim president would not be able to run for president in elections several months later, and those who really wanted the long-term position therefore took themselves out of the running for the interim post.

== Aftermath ==
Carmona was succeeded by Diosdado Cabello, vice president during Chávez's previous administration, after being sworn in by the National Assembly. Cabello then returned power to Hugo Chávez, restoring his second term. Carmona resigned, was arrested, and later fled the country, seeking asylum in Colombia.

== See also ==
- Interim government of Juan Guaidó, later anti-Chavismo rival government in Venezuela
