= 2002 Venezuelan coup attempt =

Failed coup against President Hugo Chávez

2002 Venezuelan coup d'état attempt
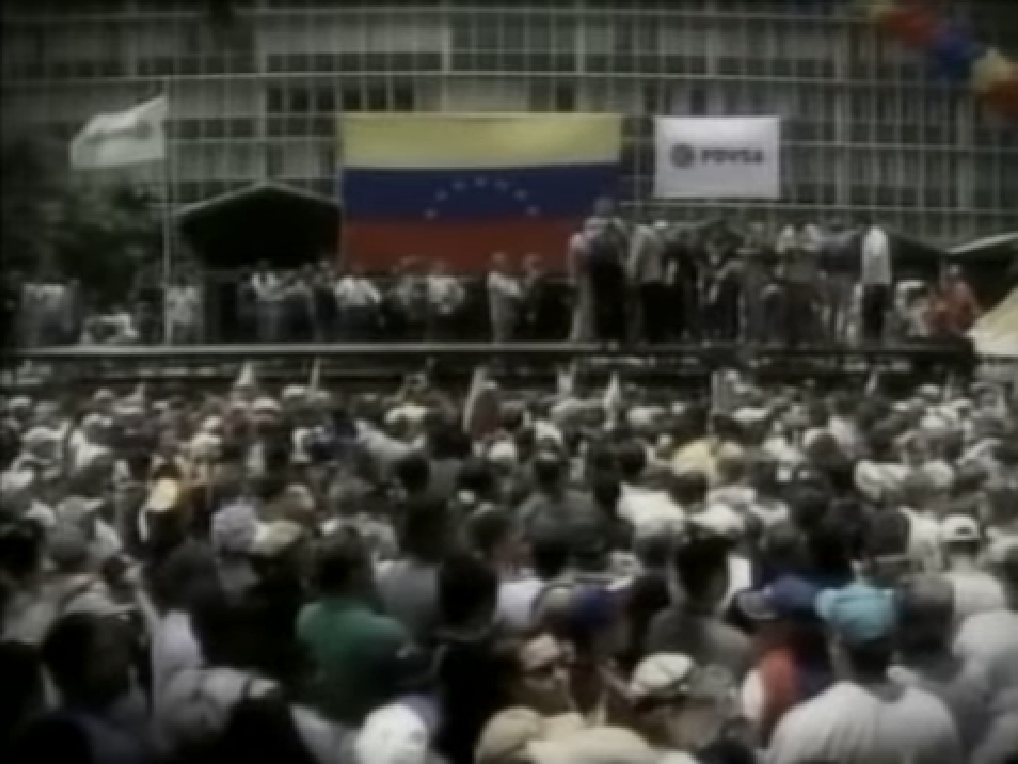
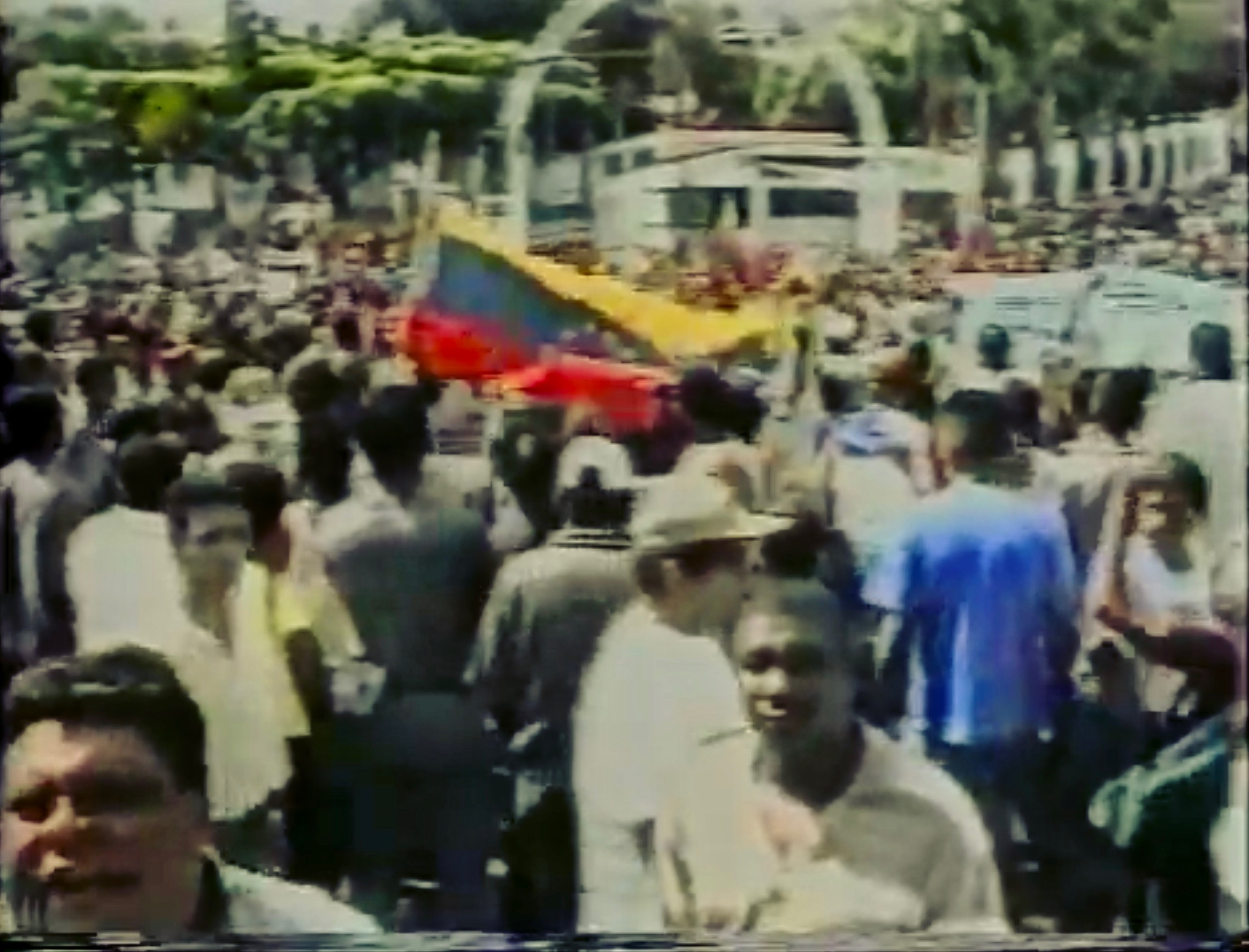
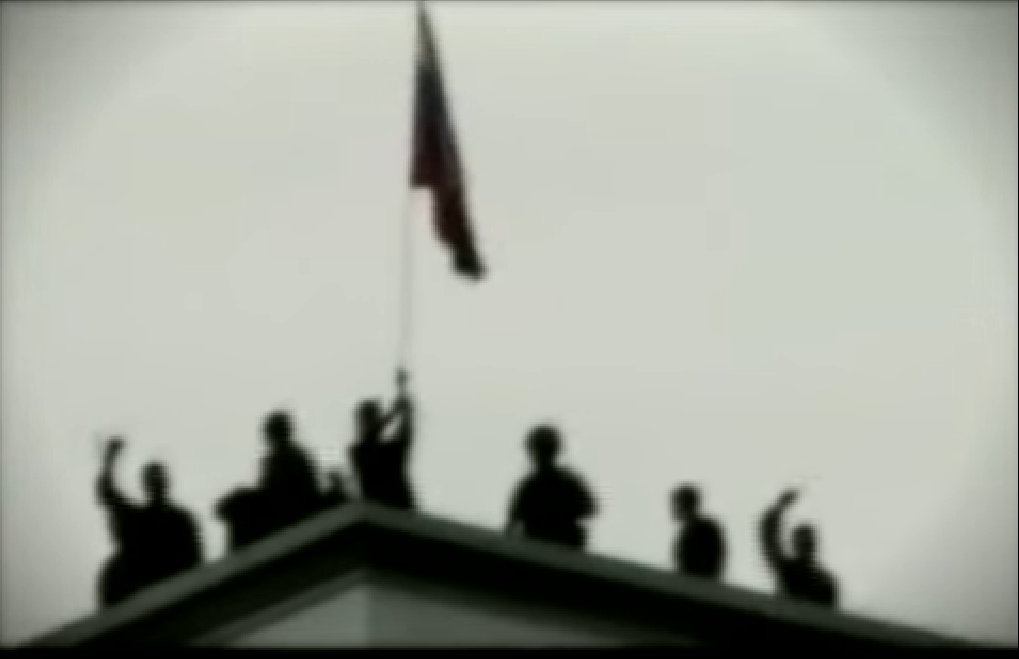
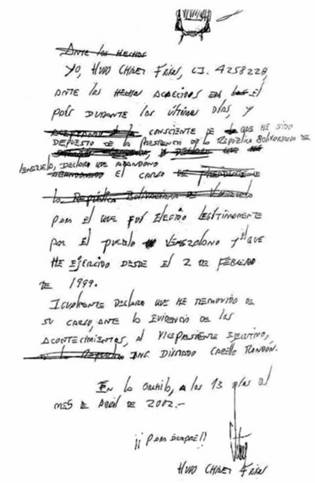
- Top to bottom, left to right: Venezuelan opposition protesters in Chuao on 11 April, chavistas outside of Miraflores Palace protesting Chávez's removal, the Presidential Honor Guard waving the Venezuelan flag above Miraflores following Chávez's return on 13 April, alleged resignation letter of Chávez.
Date	11–13 April 2002; 24 years ago
Location	Venezuela
Result	Coup failed: Chávez reinstated by military loyalists and government supporters; Pedro Carmona exiled into Colombia

Belligerents
(Venezuela) Government: Fifth Republic Movement; Bolivarian National Armed Forces of Venezuela loyalists; Pro-government demonstrators; Bolivarian Circles	(Venezuela) Opposition: Elements of the Venezuelan Armed Forces; Anti-government demonstrators

Commanders and leaders
Hugo Chávez (President of Venezuela); Diosdado Cabello; José Vicente Rangel; Nicolás Maduro Pro-government protests: No organized leadership	(Venezuela) Military High Command (Venezuela) Pedro Carmona

Casualties and losses
- 19 dead and 150+ injured (Llaguno Overpass events)

A failed coup d'état on 11 April 2002 saw Venezuelan President Hugo Chávez, ousted from office for 47 hours before being restored to power. Chávez was aided in his return to power by popular support and mobilization against the coup by loyal ranks in the military. By early 2002, Chávez's approval rating had dropped to around 30%, with many business, church and media leaders being opposed to Chávez's use of emergency powers to bypass the National Assembly and institute significant government changes, arguing they were increasingly authoritarian. Meanwhile, the growing dissatisfaction with Chávez among those in the military due to his aggressive manner and alliances with Cuba and paramilitaries led multiple officers to call on Chávez to resign. Demonstrations and counter-demonstrations took place on a weekly basis as the country became increasingly divided. Retired military officers, former politicians, union leaders, and spokespeople for the Catholic Church claimed they had military support to remove Chávez from power, with an April 6 CIA intelligence report warning that plotters would try to exploit social unrest from upcoming opposition demonstrations for his removal.

Tensions worsened on 7 April, when PDVSA President Guaicaipuro Lameda Montero and 5 of the 7 members of the board of directors were fired. On 9 April, a general strike was called by the trade union organization National Federation of Trade Unions (Confederación de Trabajadores de Venezuela, CTV). The proposed strike was in response to Chávez's appointments to prominent posts in Venezuela's national oil company PDVSA. Two days later in Caracas, up to one hundred fifty thousand Venezuelans marched in opposition to Chávez. After stopping at its original end point, the march continued towards the presidential palace, Miraflores, where government supporters and Bolivarian Circles were holding their own rally. Upon the opposition's arrival, the two sides confronted each other. A shootout started at the Llaguno Overpass, near the Miraflores Palace, and by that evening 19 people were dead. Chávez ordered the implementation of Plan Ávila, a military plan to mobilize an emergency force to protect the palace in the event of a coup. As the plan would have resulted in the killing of hundreds of Venezuelans, as happened during the Caracazo, military high command refused and demanded he resign. President Chávez was subsequently arrested by the military. Chávez's request for asylum in Cuba was denied, and he was ordered to be tried in a Venezuelan court.

Venezuelan Federation of Chambers of Commerce (Fedecámaras) president Pedro Carmona was declared interim president. During his brief rule, the National Assembly and the Supreme Court were both dissolved and the country's 1999 Constitution was declared void, pledged a return to the pre-1999 bicameral parliamentary system, parliamentary elections by December, presidential elections where he would not stand. By the 13th, the coup was on the verge of collapse, as Carmona's attempts to entirely undo Chávez's reforms angered much of the public and key sectors of the military, while parts of the opposition movement also refused to back Carmona. In Caracas, Chávez supporters surrounded the presidential palace, seized television stations and demanded his return. Carmona resigned the same night. The pro-Chávez Presidential Guard retook Miraflores without firing a shot, leading to the removal of the Carmona government and the re-installation of Chávez as president. On January 15, 2004, during a speech before the National Assembly, Chávez would afterwards admit that he deliberately provoked a crisis with his actions, declaring that "what happened with PDVSA was necessary" and "when I grabbed the whistle in an Aló Presidente and started to fire people, I was provoking the crisis".

== Background and rising tensions ==
Hugo Chávez was first elected president in 1998. One of his campaign promises was to convene a new constitutional convention, and on 15 December 1999 he put the new Constitution of Venezuela to the voters in a referendum. Following the 1999 constitutional referendum, Chávez was reelected in 2000 under the terms of the new constitution. Following these elections, Chávez had gained control of all formerly independent institutions of the Venezuelan government. The popularity of Chávez then dropped due to his clashes with multiple social groups he had alienated and his close ties with controversial world leaders such as Ali Khamenei, Saddam Hussein, Muammar Gaddafi and especially Fidel Castro.

"Come out to the street and look at me! The more dirt you throw at me, the more I'll throw at you. That is who I am."

— Hugo Chávez, 2001

Chávez used a strategy of polarization in Venezuela, a "them against us" situation, in order to single out those who stood in the way of his progress. He would insult and use name calling against original supporters that would question him; the media, business leaders, the Catholic Church and the middle class. Such "words spawned hatred and polarization", with Chávez, "a master of language and communication", creating his own reality among Venezuelans. Nelson says that what hurt Chávez's popularity the most was his relationship with Fidel Castro and Cuba, with Chávez attempting to make Venezuela in Cuba's image. Venezuela became Cuba's largest trade partner while Chávez, following Castro's example, consolidated the country's bicameral legislature into a single National Assembly that gave him more power and created paramilitary groups of loyal supporters. Such actions created great fear among Venezuelans who felt like they were tricked and that Chávez had dictatorial goals.

Opposition to the Chávez government was then particularly strong, with some of those who were previously in the government before the election of Chávez. The independent media became the primary check on Chávez after he had taken control of most of the Venezuelan government, with the Venezuelan media acting like other forms of media in Latin America at the time that demanded accountability for governmental abuses and exposing corruption. The opposition was worried with Chávez because they believed his rewriting Venezuela's constitution were signs that Chávez was trying to maintain power through authoritarianism. In early 2002, there were also increasing signs of discontent in the military; in February four military officials, including a general and a rear admiral, publicly called on Chávez to resign. On 7 February 2002 Venezuela Air Force Colonel Pedro Vicente Soto and National Reserve Captain Pedro Flores Rivero led a rally protesting the Chávez government's practices denounced as undemocratic and authoritarian. Rear Admiral Carlos Molina Tamayo said on television that if Chávez did not resign, he should be impeached.

Chávez's opposition originated from the response to the "cubanization" of Venezuela when mothers realized that the new textbooks in Venezuela were really Cuban books filled with revolutionary propaganda and with different covers causing them to protest. By the summer months of 2001, the opposition groups grew quickly from concerned mothers to labor unions, business interests, church groups, and right and leftwing political parties, who felt that they were being isolated. At the same time, groups supporting Chávez became organized, especially among the poor, with their passion for Chávez bordering idolatry since he gave them hope and feeling of being valuable.

=== The 49 Laws ===
Between 2001 and 2003, multiple chavistas started opposing Chávez as well. On 28 July 2001, Pedro Carmona defeated Alberto Cudemus, a businessman close to Chavism, in the elections for President of Fedecámaras. On August 4, Carmona coincides with Chavez at the Venezuelan Military Academy, where the anniversary of the National Guard was being celebrated. According to Carmona, Chávez told he no longer wanted conflicts with Fedecámaras, and they plan a meeting on 22 August at the Miraflores Presidential Palace. At the meeting, Carmona proposes to Chávez a plan to lower unemployment, at that time at 17%, improving conditions in order to increase private investment up to 20% of the GDP in five years, while the latter responds with a plan to strengthen the public sector. A dialogue table was then created between Fedecámaras and the government, the latter represented by Jorge Giordani, Minister of Planning. The meetings did not bring results, despite the fact that they took place once a week and that Chávez was present in one of them. The government continued to elaborate 49 controversial laws without sharing their content with Fedecámaras or its agrarian equivalent, Fedenaga, which its critics argued violated Articles 206 and 211 of the Constitution.

On 13 November, Chavez decrees the 49 laws under the enabling law granted to him by the National Assembly in November 2000, a legal instrument which allowed him to legislate without the approval of the legislative power. Although originally two thirds of the Assembly were controlled by Chavismo, the situation had changed due to the fact that some deputies had become dissident and it was unlikely that Chávez would be able to obtain another enabling law, reason for which Chávez approved the laws the day before his special power expired. The laws included the Organic Hydrocarbons Law, the Fishing Law, the Special Law of Cooperative Associations and the General Ports Law, and included the rearrangement of public ministries and government major laws change, but the Land and Agrarian Development Law was the most controversial.

The laws "marked a turning point in public sentiment toward the president" with both Chávez supporters and critics outraged at the changes. The two decrees in particular sparked protest: a law aimed at strengthening government control over the oil company PDVSA and a more controversial land reform law, which included provisions for the expropriation of "idle" lands. Though the government stated that it would provide the previous owners with compensation at the going market rates, the land laws introduced by Chávez were so vaguely worded that the government could legally expropriate any property it wished to take. While some of the land was genuinely given to the vulnerable, much of it was used in a system of patronage for party members loyal to Chávez.

McCaughan described the 49 laws as the "plus ultra non", the "point of no return for Chávez's troubled relations with business, church and media leaders". For the opposition, such dramatic changes to the government proved to them that Chávez was a "dictator-in-training". On 10 December 2001, a national strike shut down 90% of the economy and was the largest strike in Venezuela's history, bigger than the strike that assisted with ending the dictatorship of Marcos Pérez Jiménez in 1958. By January 2002, protests involving hundreds of thousands of Venezuelans opposing Chávez became common in Venezuela.

=== Petróleos de Venezuela (PDVSA) ===
In March 2002, Petróleos de Venezuela (PDVSA), the state oil company that acted autonomously and accounted for 70% of Venezuela's foreign revenue, was targeted by Chávez out of fear of the oppositions ability to call national strikes and was to receive strict control from the government. Chávez's attempts to end the functional independence of PDVSA were met with strong resistance from PDVSA officials and managers.

External videos
- Chávez firing PDVSA executives in national television and blowing a referee whistle, as if to expel them from a football match, 7 April 2002

On 7 April, Chávez fired the president of PDVSA, Brigadier-General Guaicaipuro Lameda Montero and replaced him with a former Communist Party militant, in addition to firing another 5 of the 7 members of the PDVSA board of directors on his Aló Presidente program, mocking each worker by name and using a referee whistle, as if to expel them from a soccer match. Such actions by Chávez caused further opposition in the form of a series of walkouts and work slowdowns.

The Washington Times then noted that Chávez had "choked off foreign investment by doubling the royalty payments oil companies must pay to the government and by restricting corporate ownership on some oil projects to 49 percent", and had "alienated workers at his country's state-owned oil company, Petroleos de Venezuela, by replacing long-serving professionals with his supporters". By early 2002, Chávez's approval rating dropped to around 30%. This action, according to The Los Angeles Times, "united all the anti-Chávez forces", bringing together union leader Carlos Ortega, head of the Confederation of Workers of Venezuela (Confederación de Trabajadores de Venezuela, CTV for short in Spanish), with Pedro Carmona Estanga, head of Venezuela's main business federation, Fedecámaras, in a call for an "indefinite general strike" in support of oil workers.

=== Military ===
The existing military grew wary of Chávez due to his relationship with Fidel Castro and the Colombian guerrilla group FARC that they were previously taught "were the greatest threat to their country". The military felt that after fighting against Castro's influence, guerilla groups and attempts to overthrow previous Venezuelan governments to expand his revolutionary presence since the 1960s, that they had finally lost when Chávez came to power. Chávez promoted guerilla fighters into the Venezuelan military and forced the wary existing military servicemen to assist them. One of the more controversial actions that created discontent within the military was when Chávez forced them to assist the FARC with setting up camps in Venezuelan territories, providing ammunition to fight the Colombian government, supplying ID cards so they could move freely through Venezuela and sending members of Bolivarian Circles to their camps to receive guerilla training. The most controversial steps taken by Chávez was ordering the existing military to work with the Cuban military, with the Venezuelan military and intelligence agencies forced to open their bases, files and hard drives for their Cuban counterparts creating a sense of being betrayed by Chávez.

The "long-simmering resentment in the military" was articulated publicly by four high-level officers, including Air Force General Roman Gomez Ruiz, who called on Chávez to "resign peacefully and take responsibility for your failure". Chávez responded by declaring these officers traitors, ordering their arrest, and forcing their resignations. The Chicago Tribune later reported that although the Venezuelan general public was unaware of it, the country's oil industry was approaching the end of a six-week work slowdown and Chávez's government and oil executives had agreed that members of an oil board picked by Chávez would resign. "But labor and business leaders, who had joined in secret with dissident military officers in an effort to oust Chávez, decided that the moment had come to press on", the newspaper maintained. "The middle-class intellectuals and professionals who had at first delighted in Chávez's talk of restoring 'national honor'", Sandra Hernandez later observed in The Los Angeles Times, "watched in dismay as Chávez's supporters formed 'Bolivarian circles', muscle groups that intimidated government opponents with threats of physical harm". During the year or so preceding the coup, Chávez "essentially thumbed his nose" at his opponents, claimed a political consultant. Many opponents of Chávez felt that his behavior was self-destructive and that he would end up "los[ing] power through constitutional means via the Supreme Court or the parliament". Nonetheless, according to The New York Times, "discontented military officers had been meeting among themselves and with business leaders for almost a year to discuss ways to oust Mr. Chávez". These military officers "said they would pick the leader", one officer said, because "They did not want to be called a military junta, but they wanted to make sure that at least one military person was on the transitional board."

=== Advanced planning ===
Details surrounding a potential coup were openly discussed in Venezuela for months before the attempted ousting, with groups of former politicians, retired military officers, union leaders, and spokespeople for the Catholic Church claiming they had support within the military for a possible coup. "The rumors of a coup to oust Chávez", noted The Miami Herald, "were being whispered, if not shouted, for months before the revolt". Writing about the run-up to the coup, Letta Tayler of Newsweek observed that "[o]ne of the few certainties" about it was "that military, business, union and civic leaders had been plotting Chávez's downfall for nearly two years".

The Guardian reported that as early as 18 March 2002 that "Chávez was saying that he was aware of a plot" to overthrow him, and that in the days before 11 April, "the political temperature was approaching boiling point", with oil workers striking "in protest at Chávez's appointments to their board" and the media accelerating its criticisms of the regime. The Chicago Tribune reported that there had been rumors in Caracas "for weeks" about a coup, with military figures like Navy Vice Adm. Carlos Molina and Air Force Col. Pedro Soto "building support ... in the armed forces" for a coup. Hernandez claimed that in early April, "the coming coup ... was an open secret". On 9 April, retired General Manuel Andara Clavier, one of many retired military officials who opposed Chávez, reportedly told her, "The table is set. ... Everything is set for the military to let the president know he can't push this country to spill blood."

==== U.S. knowledge and warnings ====
The United States learned of details about a potential coup in late-2001 due to the nature of Venezuelan individuals openly plotting to overthrow President Chávez. Generals who opposed Chavez notified U.S. officials of the impending coup, with one official noting they were not seeking U.S. approval but rather simply providing advanced knowledge. In March 2002 only days after United States ambassador to Venezuela Charles Shapiro began his duties in Venezuela and just weeks before the coup attempt, Shapiro met with a trade union organization. Ambassador Shapiro later said that, during this meeting, the group openly shared their desire to be part of the coup, with Shapiro informing them that the United States would not support such actions and that governmental change should only occur electorally.

On April 6, the C.I.A. completed a report titled, "Conditions Ripening for Coup Attempt," writing, "Dissident military factions, including some disgruntled senior officers and a group of radical junior officers, are stepping up efforts to organize a coup against President Chavez, possibly as early as this month." The report additionally explained how the coup was expected to happen: "To provoke military action, the plotters may try to exploit unrest stemming from opposition demonstrations slated for later this month." The United States embassy in Venezuela later stated that it had informed Chávez of a possible coup, though Chávez ignored their warnings. The United States government recognized Pedro Carmona as new President within hours of the coup and considered that Chávez had "resigned".

==== Government preparations ====
On 7 April, the same day that President Chávez fired the PDVSA officials, Chávez met with his cabinet and high level military officials and began the meeting calling the actions by the opposition "treasonous" and asked those gathered how to counteract such actions. Soon discussions arose on how to defend Miraflores Palace. There were recommendations declaring a state of emergency, beginning the censorship of television and declaring martial law. Chávez then began to discuss Plan Ávila with Manuel Rosendo, the head of the Unified Command of the National Armed Forces, and how to implement it, though the military command did not accept it.

The Tactical Command, headed by Cilia Flores, Guillermo García Ponce and Freddy Bernal (mayor of the Libertador Municipality), then shared plans of using the Bolivarian Circles as a paramilitary force to end marches and also defend Chávez by organizing them into brigades. Another plan was to have the National Guard raid the offices of PDVSA in Chuao and occupy the company by force. They also discussed launching a disinformation propaganda campaign on public and private television and having government loyalists fill the highways with their vehicles and then present the images on TV as if people were busy working like any other day. In another plan to end the strike, Gastón Parra, the president of PDVSA, suggested to give bonuses to PDVSA employees who chose not to participate in the strike.

In a 9 April discussion between Finance Minister General Francisco Usón and General Jacinto Pérez, Pérez believed that the Bolivarian Revolution was in a crisis and needed to "rejuvenate itself". Pérez then stated that the Bolivarian Revolution need had to be "purified with blood", which concerned Usón since Pérez "had the president's ear". Both discussions outraged generals since they believed that the Venezuelan government was proposing violence against the public with General Rosendo stating that it seemed that "Chávez actually wanted a confrontation, that he had picked the fight with PDVSA in order to precipitate a crisis".

Shortly before the coup attempt, Alí Rodríguez Araque, a former guerrilla and Chávez ally then serving in Vienna as the general secretary of OPEC, allegedly heard of a potential oil embargo against the United States by Iraq and Libya, over US support for Israel. Rodríguez Araque told Chávez that the United States could prod a coup to prevent any threat of an embargo. The advice led Chávez to declare that he would not join such an embargo, and to secretly hide several hundred troops in Miraflores' underground corridors, commanded by José Baduel.

=== Strikes ===
On 10 December, the opposition organised a one-day general strike, which was substantially effective. Newspapers, workplaces, schools and the stock exchange closed, although shops in poorer neighborhoods remained open. On 5 April 2002, the PDVSA opposition to Chávez moved to shut down the company. Thousands of opposition PDVSA employees, and two of the five main export terminals were paralyzed. On 6 April the Confederación de Trabajadores de Venezuela (CTV) trade union federation announced a 24-hour general strike for 9 April, to support the PDVSA protestors. It was joined the following day by Venezuelan Federation of Chambers of Commerce, headed by Pedro Carmona and Fedepetrol, the country's largest blue-collar petroleum union. On 7 April, during the transmission of the television program Aló Presidente, Chávez started naming the PDVSA executives that announced the strike, mockingly blew a referee whistle, and proceeded to announce their dismissal. He fired seven executives forced another 12 into retirement. Tensions continued to escalate through March and early April.

Days after the firing of PDVSA heads, on 9 April, the general strike was moderately successful and oil production slowed. Newspapers were not published and television stations cancelled regular programming and commercials to run continuous coverage of the strike, including the stations' own opposition ads. The strike organizers declared it a success, which the government disputed, and in an effort to show its version of events, ordered a series of cadenas (mandatory government broadcasts) showing daily life continuing (over 30 cadenas on 8 and 9 April). On the evening of 9 April, the strike was extended for another 24 hours.

On 10 April, the strike was less effective, with many schools and businesses re-opening. As with the previous day, television provided continuous coverage, and the government intervened with cadenas – but this time the networks split the screen, showing the cadena on one side and their coverage of the strike on the other. On the evening of 10 April, Fedecámaras and CTV held televised news conference announcing that the strike would be extended indefinitely, unanimously voted for a "coordinating committee for democracy and liberty" in order to "rescue Venezuela's freedom". The opposition then called for a march to the PDVSA headquarters the following day. In the National Assembly, those close to Chávez stated that Chávez wanted "moderation", though if an unlimited general strike were to occur from the opposition, an "unspecified 'violence will occur'". Brigadier General Néstor González appeared on television to demand Chávez's resignation and to issue an ultimatum.

== 11 April ==
The crisis that triggered the coup came when "workers and business leaders", infuriated by Chávez's "meddling in the state oil company", as the Chicago Tribune put it, joined in "calling for a general strike that cut exports" in support of striking oil workers. The strike began, according to The Washington Post, "as a managerial protest at the state-run oil company, but evolved into a broad effort supported by the country's largest business and labor groups to force Chávez from power." After days of general strikes and protests involving thousands of Venezuelans, on 10 April, a speech was held at the CTV headquarters, where CTV and Fedecámaras held speeches that involved a brigadier general denouncing Chávez's alleged involvement with FARC, and the announcement of a march the next day with the possibility of an indefinite strike. The march on 11 April was to begin at 9:00am, starting at Parque del Este and ending at the PDVSA headquarters.

On 11 April, just hours before an operation to take over the PDVSA by force was to begin, General Rosendo, knowing the consequences of such an action, talked Chávez out of the plan. Later that day, one hundred fifty thousand Venezuelans marched to the PDVSA headquarters later that day to protest against the recent dismissal of the management board. Once at the headquarters, those present at the rally began to chant "To Miraflores! To Miraflores! To Miraflores!", in reference to the Miraflores Presidential Palace. In response, Carlos Ortega declared: "This human river is now going to Miraflores to ask for your resignation", referring to Chávez. The National Guard would later repress the concentration in Chuao and, equipped with firearms, would confront the demonstrators in the vicinity of the Miraflores Palace.

Close to Miraflores, a line of police and National Guard held the marchers for a time, before the marchers pressed. Chavistas belonging to Bolivarian Circles, some with that had military training in Cuba, were also stationed outside of Miraflores. The Circles had been positioned outside of the palace throughout the week during the unrest. Government officials used the hours it took for the march to travel eight kilometres (5 mi) to the palace to call on loyalists to gather at Miraflores. National Assembly Deputy Juan Barreto told loyalists through the media covering the situation, "The call is to Miraflores! Everyone to Miraflores to defend your revolution! Don't let them through!" A crowd of government supporters, in close but smaller numbers to the anti-Chavez marchers, quickly arrived from shanty towns. Some government supporters, who began to gather then, were armed with Molotov cocktails, rocks, sticks, chains, baseball bats, and metal pipes, and were ignored by the Venezuelan National Guard stationed to defend Chávez. According to General Rosendo, Defense Minister José Vicente Rangel ordered Freddy Bernal to prepare the Bolivarian Circles to attack the opposition demonstration.

"Rosendo, we are going to direct the operations from here [Miraflores] ... Plan Ávila ... And I have my rifle ready to put lead in anyone who tries to stop this revolution that has cost me so much."

— President Hugo Chávez

At about 12:00pm, Chávez knew the march was on its way and he called for the implementation of a military plan to occupy key locations in the city. Plan Ávila, as it was known, existed to mobilize an emergency force to protect the palace and prevent a coup. The plan was first used by Carlos Andrés Pérez during the Caracazo, resulting in the killings of hundreds and possibly thousands of Venezuelans. This caused discomfort among some in the military, since they knew that Chávez was violating the constitution he helped create by ordering High Command to have the military control civilians.

=== Llaguno Overpass events ===
By 12:30 pm, thousands of government supporters were gathered around the palace blocking all routes to Miraflores except for the Llaguno Overpass, which was where the Bolivarian Circles had gathered to overlook the route. As the march turned a corner and began to approach the Miraflores at about 2:00 pm, the National Guard fired about twelve tear gas canisters from behind the palace walls and the protesters fled back down the road. The protesters made it closer to Miraflores and the Presidential Guard responded with more tear gas. About 20 gas canisters caused panic and a dispersion of the demonstrators to areas surrounding the palace.

Since other routes were blocked by the National Guard, many marchers began to head down Baralt Avenue in order to reach Miraflores. On Baralt Avenue, near the Llaguno Overpass as the march inched closer hundreds of Chávez supporters gathered and began throwing large rocks, Molotov cocktails and even tear gas at the demonstrators. Upon arrival of the marchers at Miraflores, the opposing sides were initially separated by two forces: the National Guard loyal to Chávez and the Metropolitan Police controlled by former Caracas mayor Alfredo Peña, a former Chávez supporter who had joined the opposition. As marchers and Chavistas clashed, the Metropolitan Police attempted to separate both sides from further confrontation with two trucks with water cannons.

Trying to regain the initiative, Chávez spoke in a lengthy broadcast on the successes of his administration while calling for peace, but the networks decided to split the screen, showing the violence outside the palace, with the audio from the speech appearing disrupted. A few minutes after the speech concluded, gunfire erupted again and the march began to disperse slightly. As the demonstrators marched closer to the Llaguno Overpass, they could see Chavistas heavily armed, some with pistols. Police began to disperse the Chavista gunmen returning fire and few demonstrators began to follow behind them with pings of gunfire heard on the police armored vehicles, though the marchers fled shortly after as the violence grew. According to medical staff at the Vargas Hospital, the first to arrive at the hospital were opposition marchers. According to surgeons, the marchers had been shot in the back with handgun fire while fleeing and others were severely injured from 7.62×51mm NATO military rounds from FN FAL rifles, standard equipment of the National Guard defending Chávez. Later after police responded to pro-Chávez shooting, Chávez supporters then began being seen injured in the hospitals. As a result of the confrontations, 19 were left dead, most killed between 3:20 pm and 3:55 pm, and over 150 injured. The New York Times reported on 20 April, "The killings at the anti-Chávez demonstration rocked the country, reviving memories of the violent events in 1989, known as the Caracazo, in which hundreds were killed by government forces. Venezuelans across the political spectrum swore that such violence would never take place again."

== Coup ==
=== Plan Ávila and military insubordination ===
Immediately after Chávez finished his broadcast at 5:25pm he changed into his military fatigues and grabbed his rifle and pistol, worrying about rebels entering the palace. Chávez believed that the best way to stay in power was to implement Plan Ávila. However, mobilizing the military to execute the plan was unconstitutional, as only the National Guard was allowed to maintain public order. Since General Rosendo would not comply earlier in the day with Chávez's order to implement the plan, Chávez went directly to General Jorge García Carneiro, one of his most trusted generals and ordered him to go through with it. Upon contacting the military base Fuerte Tiuna to issue the commands, he was rebuffed and informed that a group of generals at the base intended to arrest Chávez.

Shortly after 6:00pm, word spread at Fort Tiuna that Carneiro was still seeking to implement Plan Ávila. Head of the army General Efraín Vásquez Velasco was meeting at the Army School with other officers concerned about Chávez's use of violence when Chávez ordered General Carneiro, one of Vásquez Velasco's subordinates, to go ahead with Plan Ávila. Vásquez Velasco, who founded the Office of Human Rights of the Venezuelan Army, knew that if the plan were implemented that he would be blamed since he was the head of the army. Soon after, General Vásquez Velasco learned that General Carneiro did not comply with his orders and was sending about 20 tanks to Miraflores to support Chávez. Vásquez Velasco called the tank commander ordering him to return with the commander complying with the general. General Vásquez Velasco then ordered a nationwide military lockdown with military movements requiring written documentation and approval, a move by Vásquez Velasco that was to prevent troops loyal to Chávez from suppressing the march and would also deter rebellious attacks from the military against Chávez. Vásquez Velasco then ordered the Chávez-loyalist General Carneiro be arrested before he could arrest the other officers under Chávez's orders, but Carneiro complied with Vásquez Velasco.

At 6:30, leaders of business and labor pulled their support from Chávez and by 6:45 pm, "Navy Chief of Staff Vice Adm. Hector Ramirez Perez and nine other generals and admirals who had been talking since July about pressuring Chávez into changing his ways decided to rebel and go public", according to The Miami Herald. "Even many military officers who were neutral in their feelings about Chávez were persuaded to turn against the president after Thursday's massacre", The Chicago Tribune later reported. "Soon press conferences flooded the airwaves as dozens of officers, more than 50 in all, denounced the president."

At around 7:30 pm, Venevisión began broadcasting its version of events that afternoon, showing the Chavistas firing from Puente Llaguno, juxtaposed with footage of dead or wounded protesters, saying that the Chavistas planned an ambush and shot unarmed opposition protestors. This showed General Vásquez Velasco and other generals that Chávez had ordered the Bolivarian Circles to attack opposition marchers. The military officers, including General Raúl Baduel, a founder of Chávez's MBR-200, then decided that they had to pull support from Chávez to deter another massacre and shortly after at 8:00 pm, Vásquez Velasco, together with other ranking army officers, declared that Chávez had lost his support. This was followed by heads of the Venezuelan Air Force and Navy, with Chávez then losing power of the military. By 8:30 pm, Luis Miquilena, Chávez's mentor and a respected individual among his government being described as "the most important civilian who supported the Chávez government" pulled his support from Chávez stating, "I solemnly declare that it is very difficult that a government of this nature could ever count on the possibility of help on my part ... (the government) had ended up stained in blood". Following this, Chávez had also lost the support of the legislative and judicials branches who supported Miquilena.

Infuriated by the violence but "reluctant to stage an outright coup", according to The New York Times, a group of military officers who called themselves the "Movement for the Integrity and Dignity of the National Armed Forces" demanded on Thursday evening that Chávez resign. In a statement, they declared that they had no longer had "recognition" of Chávez, whom they accused of "betraying the trust of the people" and held responsible for the deaths of peaceful protesters. The statement was read at a press conference by Vice Adm. Hector Ramirez Perez, chief of staff of the Venezuelan Navy and chairman of the joint chiefs of staff, and signed by a number of other officers, including 10 senior officers of the Army, Navy, Air Force and National Guard, later described by The New York Times as occupying "largely administrative posts". Other signatories included the heads of the paramilitary National Guard and "several midlevel commanders based in the capital". Perhaps the most prominent member of this group was General Efraín Vásquez, Commander in Chief of the Army, who said, "Mr. President, I was loyal to the end, but today's deaths cannot be tolerated." He also told reporters that no coup had been planned before 11 April but that the massacre had been "too much and we had to move". Navy Vice Admiral Héctor Rafael Ramírez agreed, saying, "We cannot allow a tyrant to run the Republic of Venezuela."

At 10:20 pm National Guard general Luis Alberto Camacho Kairuz declared on television that "the government [had] abandoned its functions." Around this time, Chávez contemplated suicide. Near midnight, Fidel Castro called and urged Chávez not to kill himself and to turn himself in to the military. José Vicente Rangel later stated that "the call from Fidel was decisive so that there was no self-immolation. It was the determinant factor. His advice allowed us to see better in the darkness."

=== Chávez's detention ===
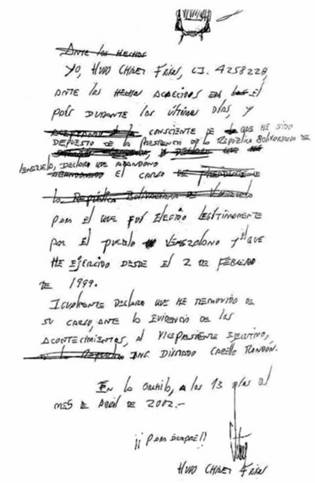
Alleged resignation letter of Chávez

In the early hours of 12 April, many demanded Chávez's resignation. With the loss of "almost all ... military force on hand in order to resist or move to another place", Chávez asked for four conditions to resign, including that he be allowed to resign before the National Assembly, with power passing constitutionally to the vice president prior to new elections, he and his family could go to Cuba and that he would be able to address the nation live on television. Vásquez and others would not agree to these conditions and dispatched two generals to arrest Chávez. At 3 a.m., with the coup plotters threatening to bomb the Miraflores palace if Chávez did not resign, Chávez phoned the head of the armed forces, General-in-Chief Lucas Rincón saying that he would do so; Rincón in turn told him that the military leadership was divided on whether to oust him or not. Within twenty minutes Rincón had announced on television that Chávez had been asked for his resignation, and had accepted. Chávez later said that he told Rincón during their telephone call that he would "abandon" the presidency, after which he "left the palace to negotiate the terms under which he would do so", saying, "I am ready to go, but I demand respect for the constitution."

At Miraflores, according to The Los Angeles Times, Chávez dispatched Rincón, his military chief of staff, to meet with the military officers at Fuerte Tiuna who were calling for him to step down. Rincón called Chávez from Fuerte Tiuna to say that the officers were "fighting among themselves" and insisting on his resignation. As The Chicago Tribune put it, "top military commanders", unable to countenance "the spectacle of a president making war on his own people", demanded that Chávez step down. Faced with this demand, Chávez "started working the phones" and also summoned a clergyman, Monsignor Baltazar Porras, to discuss "prayer and forgiveness", his purpose being "maybe as much to search his soul as to search for a way out of the crisis". Porras, whom Chávez had once reviled as one of the church's "devils in skirts", said that Chávez had "personally asked me for forgiveness for everything he had said about me".

General Vásquez ordered several generals to go to Miraflores and arrest Chávez. Meanwhile, according to Newsday, "cabinet members and honor guards sat glumly in the hallway outside ... Chávez's suite", awaiting news. Shortly after midnight, Environment Minister Maria Elisa Osorio said, "The president is being forced to leave. There's a coup." Faced with his officers' demand, Chávez reportedly refused to resign but agreed to "abandon his functions", a procedure that is provided for by Venezuelan law but that would need to be ratified by the National Assembly. There followed "hours of negotiations" in which the "key figure" was Armed Forces Commander General Lucas Rincón Romero, who did not make clear at any point during the crisis where his loyalties lay. Early Friday morning, Rincón told the public that Chávez had resigned. An hour and a half later, Carmona was named president of what was meant to be a transitional government.

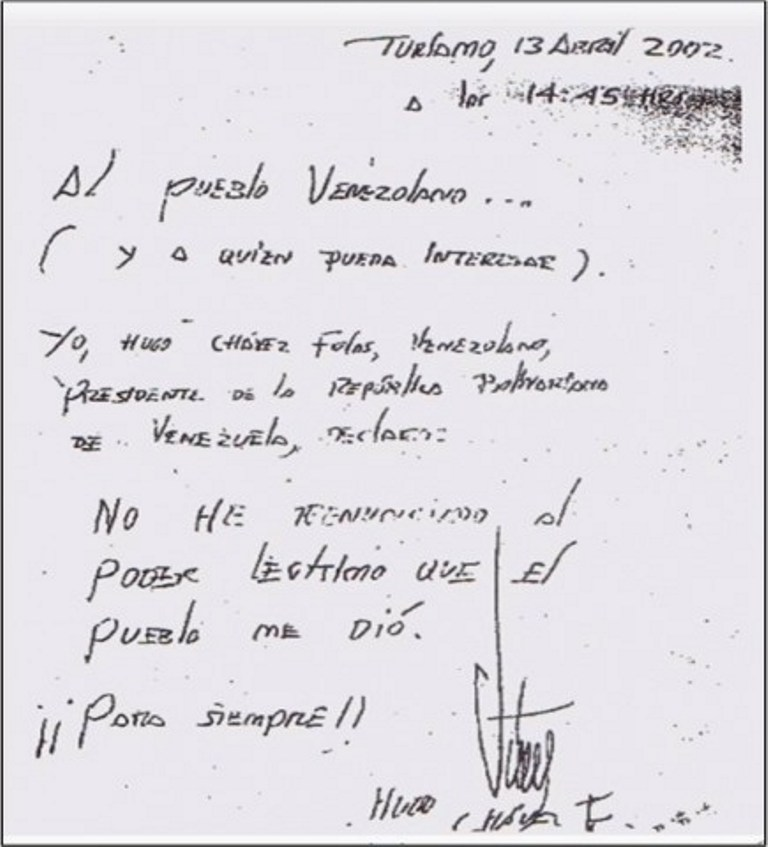
Letter of Chávez disclaiming his resignation

On Friday morning a "heavily guarded caravan" took Chávez, who was "wearing his trademark fatigues and red beret", from Miraflores to the army base at Fort Tiuna. At the base, Chávez was forced to take off the uniform and beret and dress in civilian garb. The Miami Herald observed that armed-forces officers had long been irked by his habit of wearing a military uniform during his presidency. Here he met with representatives of the Roman Catholic Church. The Los Angeles Times reported, "By midmorning on Friday, [Chávez] looked to be finished", and the military later maintained, according to The Guardian, that "the civil unrest forced them to ask Chávez for his resignation, which he gave verbally, asking to be flown to Cuba." The Cuban government was trying to arrange for him to go into exile in Cuba.

Chávez's request to be allowed to go into exile in Cuba was soon rejected, however. Army General Roman Fuemayor said: "He has to be held accountable to his country." Meanwhile, according to the Miami Herald, "Bernal, Vice President Diosdado Cabello and several other Chávez cabinet members were reported to be trying to win political asylum in foreign embassies, including those of Chile, Cuba, Iraq and Libya." Police, alert to reports that Chávez supporters in the Caracas slums were distributing weapons, began searching for guns in homes. Meanwhile, Rincón, "in full uniform", had announced on national television at about 2 a.m. that the president had resigned. Chávez would be taken to La Orchila, a military base off the coast of Venezuela. He was able to get word out arguing he had resigned via a telephone call to his daughter, who was able to speak first to Fidel Castro and then to Cuban television. After two young female military prosecutors interviewed Chávez at Fort Tiuna on Friday morning about 11 April massacre. Chávez was later flown in the evening to the naval base of Turiamo, near Puerto Cabello, where he wrote a note stating that he had not resigned.

=== Carmona's interim presidency ===
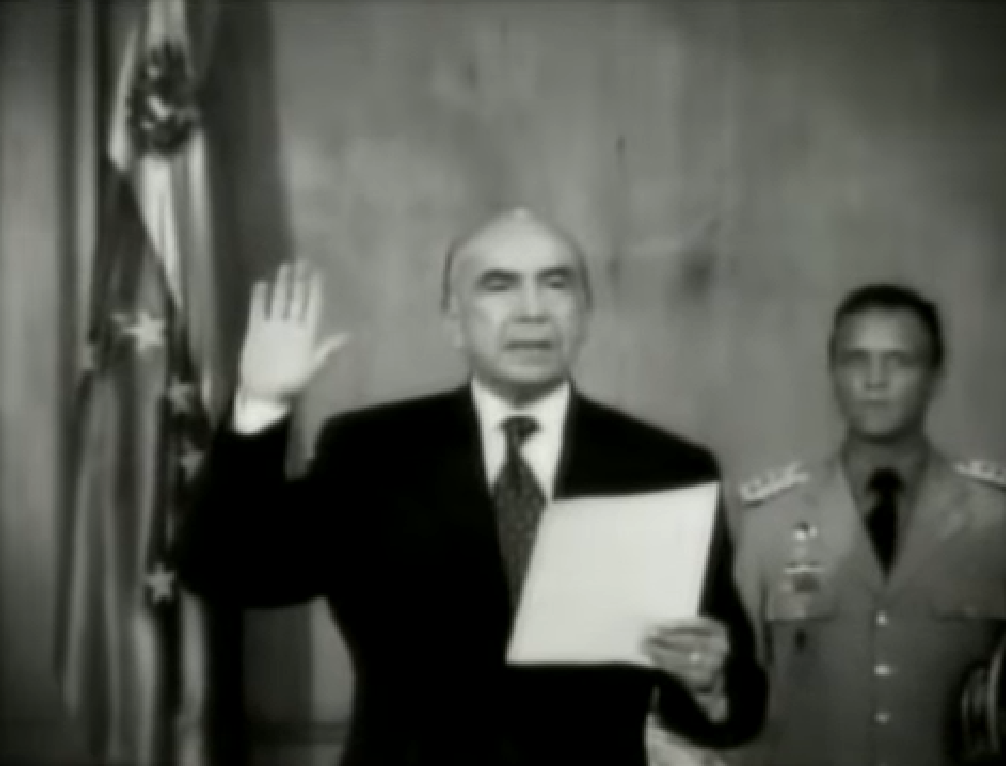
Inauguration of Pedro Carmona

Businessman Pedro Carmona, president of Fedecámaras, was installed as interim President after Chávez's detention. Carmona, described by The Miami Herald as "president for a day" told the newspaper that his acceptance of that position was, in the Herald's paraphrase, "as a spontaneous act of bravery, not the result of a monthslong conspiracy". "I was not involved in any conspiracy", Carmona said. "I cannot accept any conjecture or soap operas. I categorically deny it."

The Chicago Tribune said Carmona was "a buttoned-down businessman and economist who has degrees from Caracas' Andres Bello Catholic University and the University of Brussels" and who "has an international reputation, having represented Venezuelan commercial and diplomatic missions abroad". Describing Carmona as "a bookish economist" who had worked with the Foreign Ministry and "run a variety of trade associations", The Washington Post said that one reason he was chosen as interim president "was that he was one of the few people who didn't want the job". One condition imposed by the coup-makers was that the interim president would not be able to run for president in elections several months later, and those who really wanted the long-term position therefore took themselves out of the running for the interim post. Invited to be president by those who had deposed Chávez, Carmona had become nationally prominent as the leading figure in the previous December's general strike. The Miami Herald reported that even Chávez had described Carmona as "straightforward and low-key – until schemers manipulated him".

According to Venezuelan political analysts, Carmona was always a "moderate" and "conciliatory" figure, but in the years before the 2002 coup he "became more aggressive as Chávez did". Margarita López Maya of the University of Central Venezuela said that as Carmona rose through the ranks of Fedecámaras, "he became more aggravated, a situation which got worse because the government was provoking everyone". Upon Carmona's taking office, Juan Calvo, a Venezuelan businessman, said, "He always surrounds himself with capable people, and I'm sure that's what he will do now." Upon being sworn in, Carmona told supporters that "We must go about returning to the rule of law ... Strongman rule will be left behind. I will act in the most open manner, working with all sectors of the country." He also said that he required plenty of support "to obtain the conditions required to rebuild confidence in the country and improve its international image". In addition, he vowed that "justice would be done" for the survivors of those who had been massacred. Shortly after police confiscated scores of weapons from several Bolivarian Circles, including from a group at the Ministries of Health and Environment that was near Miraflores.

One of the immediate changes Carmona made after his inauguration was to change his country's official name back to the Republic of Venezuela from the Bolivarian Republic of Venezuela, the name established by the 1999 Constitution. News of this change was greeted with loud cheers from coup supporters at Miraflores. Edgar Paredes, interim head of Petróleos de Venezuela, announced that Venezuela would no longer be selling oil to Cuba. Moreover, Carmona's government repealed the 49 laws passed the previous November that business leaders considered damaging to the economy. Meanwhile, pro-Chávez officers in the military were being removed from their positions or assigned to remote locations.

Carmona then issued a decree, which came to be known as the Carmona Decree, dissolving the National Assembly and Supreme Court that were filled with Chávez supporters, and voiding the 1999 Constitution. The decree declared that parliamentary elections would take place in December 2002, that new general national elections would take place within a year of the decree's declaration, and that this would draft a general reform of the 1999 constitution. The decree also suspended the attorney general, controller general, state governors and all mayors elected during Chávez's administration. He also suspended the power of other branches of government and dismissed Chávez appointees while forming a new council, most of whose 25 members were Chávez opponents. As one academic and Chávez supporter. Carmona also reinstalled Guaicaipuro Lameda as head of PDVSA. PDVSA management swiftly announced the end of oil exports to Cuba, and declared that it would step up production

The removal of such officials was controversial, with one member of the opposition coalition stating that "In hindsight, it was the most idiotic thing that could have been done, (...) but we had just come out of an ambush and we were venting our distaste for the people who occupied those positions, so everyone applauded the dissolution." "The way the provisional government abandoned the constitution produced a very strong reaction – it was a big mistake" said Congressman Felipe Mujica, member of a socialist party that had broken with Chávez but been excluded from the new government. "That, and the way they were pursuing his political allies, arresting them, created the impression that this was not the right way." Such actions fragmented the broad opposition coalition which had supported the coup, with many viewing it as "the triumph of a small oligarchic elite". "Carmona was really placed in a trap" Anibal Romero, a Venezuelan political science professor, told The Los Angeles Times. "He couldn't leave the National Assembly in power and govern the country, because it was full of Chávez supporters. But if he dissolved it, he would be declared anti-democratic." Another mistake was that, although he had spent months working closely with labour leader Carlos Ortega, he appointed no labor leaders to his cabinet.

Carmona's appointment to cabinet positions of members of Opus Dei, the Catholic organization, and of members of what The New York Times called "a discredited conservative party" concerned many democratic members of the opposition coalition, and made many of them feel "they were being aced out of power by Carmona" reported the Times. The military members of the coalition were also displeased that Carmona did not consult them on military appointments. Carmona also named two naval officers, but no army officers, to the cabinet, bypassing Vásquez and instead naming Adm. Hector Ramirez Perez as minister of defense. "The army would never accept a navy officer in that job" Ret. Vice Adm. Mario Ivan Carratu later said. "It has always been that way." When he named General Rafael Damina Bustillo to be head of the National Guard, General Vásquez insisted angrily: "The officers who are with me ... will remain here." By midday Saturday, as The Washington Post later reported, "key military leaders were growing concerned" about many of Carmona's actions, unconstitutional and otherwise. "[I]n style and substance", the Post noted, "the new government quickly alienated civil groups and key elements of the armed forces, which are proud of a history of support for Venezuelan democracy."

It was also reported that there was considerable competition within the coalition. "There were many more people with aspirations than space to accommodate them, and they all seemed ready to jump ship when they felt they were being excluded" said Janet Kelly, a Venezuelan political commentator. Columnist Patricia Poleo of the Caracas newspaper El Nuevo Pais joined several government officials when she later suggested that during Carmona's tenure, Isaac Perez Recao, a member of a family that owned a controlling stake in a firm called Venoco, a subsidiary of which Carmona ran, had allegedly been a key financier of the coup and had been pulling strings behind the scenes. "He immediately surrounded himself with people who invoked fear in Venezuela" complained one official about Cormona. "Obviously, this coup was very poorly coordinated. It caught the democratic opposition by surprise." The Miami Herald reported that "moderate politicians complained that Carmona, a centrist businessman, had been 'hijacked' by rightists".

Speaking afterward about his one-day presidency, Carmona told The Miami Herald that he had been "misunderstood because ... the opposition wasted too much time forming a cabinet and naming the high military command", whereas if the coup had "been hatched in advance, those key decisions would have already been made". He regretted not stressing his plan to appoint "a 35-member representative council to help him run the nation" and to hold assembly elections in 90 days and a presidential election (in which he would not run) in December. He said he had suspended the assembly "because the new government would never have accomplished its goals with a congress so stacked to favor one party". "There was no rebellion or coup" Carmona told The New York Times after the counter-coup. "There was simply a vacuum of power that came about after the military announced the resignation of the president." Carmona said he had accepted the interim presidency because he was told by military officers that Chávez had resigned. "I was called by them to fill that role", he said. "I was called by officers and others to take over. And I had the courage to take that step." He told The Guardian that he took "full responsibility" for the actions he made, emphasizing that "there was no premeditation, no conspiracy" behind the coup and his elevation to the presidency. He said that after the 11 April march on Miraflores, he had been phoned by someone (whom he would not name) who said that Chávez had quit and offered him the presidency. "Everything happened so fast that mistakes were made", Carmona said. "If I could go back in time, I would have had a triumvirate, the power would have been shared – but everything was so quick." When asked if he had been "used by the military", he replied: "There might have been people who used me, you never know what is going on underground", but he insisted that he "acted purely in the higher interests of the country". One Western diplomat told The Miami Herald that during Carmona's brief presidency "everybody was saying what a great guy he was, professional, straight, ethical" but that after his ouster "everyone is pointing fingers at him for being a dope". Carmona himself told the Herald that he would remain a "civic activist" but would leave politics: "I have never been a politician; that is not my world", Carmona said. "As for Venezuela, we will continue the struggle."

In addition to Carmona's errors, his coalition partners made several missteps. The first was to refuse to let Chávez leave the country, as he asked, and in return for which he promised, on Thursday, to officially resign. This request was not honored because hard-line members of the coalition wanted to prosecute Chávez for the killings outside Miraflores. It was Chávez's refusal to resign that ultimately split the opposition coalition. Also, the coup-makers were criticized for raiding the homes of some Chávez supporters, including Tarek William Saab, chairman of the congressional Foreign Relations Committee, and Ramón Rodríguez Chacín, Minister of the Interior and Justice.

=== Pro-Chávez protests and restoration ===
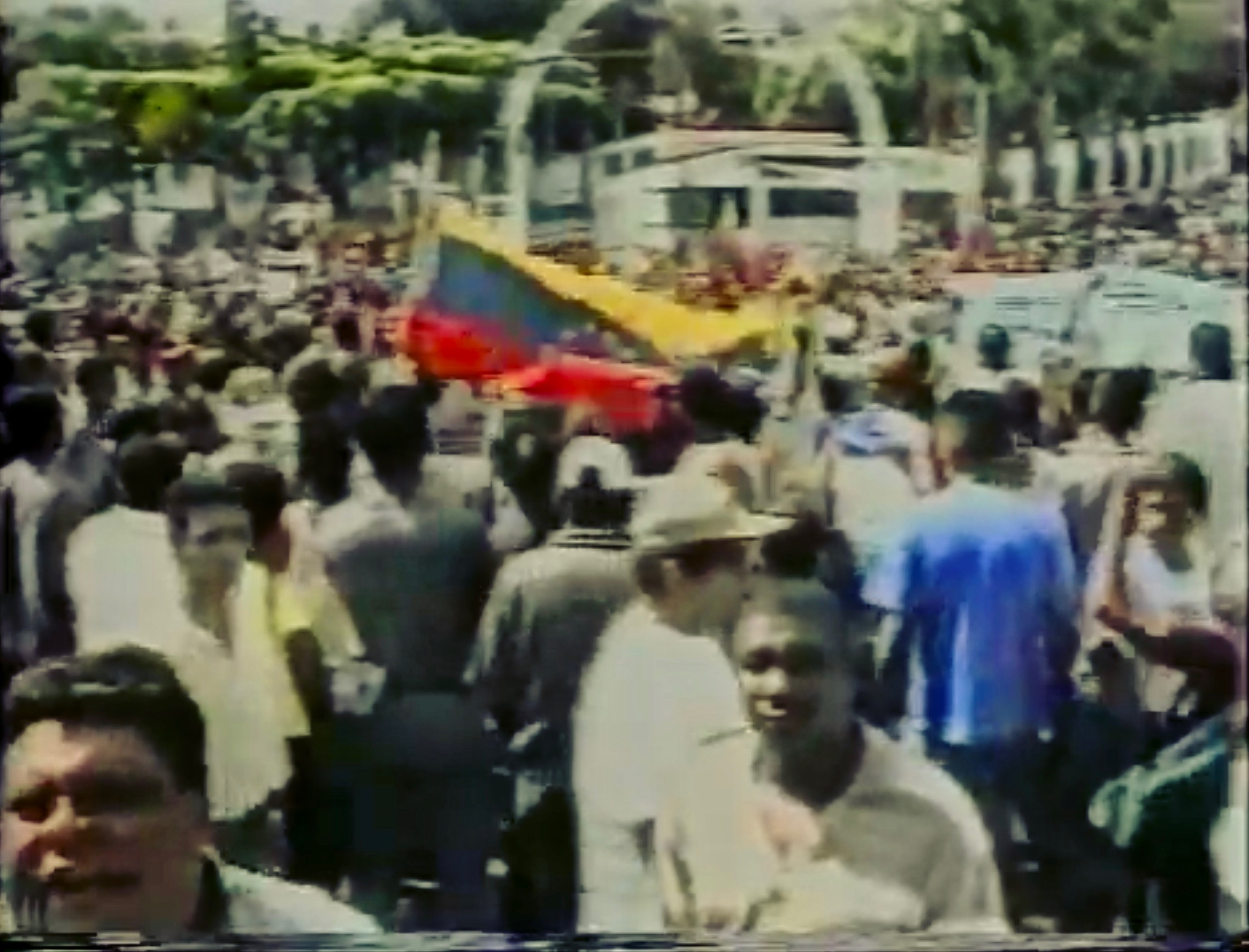
Chavista loyalists gathered outside of Miraflores Palace after hearing that Chávez had not resigned the presidency.

Prompted by the spreading news that Chávez had not resigned, Carmona's installation as president generated protests by Bolivarian Circles in support of Chávez that was suppressed by the Metropolitan Police. Baduel contacted the head of the Presidential Guard, which remained loyal to Chávez, and told him "it's now or never". Late in the morning of 13 April the Presidential Guard entered the palace from their barracks via tunnels, and retook the palace. Since Chávez was being held in a secret location, the presidency was assumed for several hours by Vice President Diosdado Cabello until Chávez was reinstated.

=== Media role ===
With the increasing disapproval of Chávez in 2001 and constant confrontations with him, the Venezuelan media, which initially approved and supported Chávez, turned against him, which then accelerated his loss of popularity. The constantly growing interruptions Chávez's government made on television with their cadenas that they saw as "an overt attempt to block the independent news coverage of the strike", media organizations agreed on 9 April to create a split screen effect for cadenas that did not involve the president, only allowing full coverage for the president out of courtesy for him. A few hours after the meeting, the first split screen cadena coverage occurred while covering a speech by the labor minister. The media organizations also felt pressure from the government since DISIP and National Guard units were seen and posted near their communication towers, planning to cut transmissions of the media.

At a 10 April meeting involving media representatives, Vice President Diosdado Cabello and Minister of Defense Rangel, the Venezuelan government blamed the media for the anti-government demonstrations, with Cabello stating the media would be "responsible for the blood that will be shed"; Globovisión's president rejected this, saying the Venezuelan government had called on Chávez supporters to confront opposition marches near Miraflores. The use of the split screen for the cadena had also been criticized by Rangel though the media owners said that the effect would continue to be implemented. At the beginning of the coup, Venezolana de Televisión (VTV), the state television channel, had its workers leave in droves, fearing for their lives since they believed they were targets like in the bloody takeover during the 1992 coup led by Chávez.

At 3:45 pm Chávez called for another cadena, though it was possibly prerecorded in order to distract Venezuelans since government officials reported that Chávez was speaking to them during the broadcast. Chávez spoke for ninety minutes on the successes of his administration and calling for peace. With the networks concerned that history was in the making and that Chávez was attempting to block a government massacre, half an hour into the cadena the networks decided to split the screen again, showing the violence outside the palace, with the audio from the cadena appearing disrupted. The video also appeared pre-recorded when Chávez called for the networks to be disconnected due to actions performed on 9 April and not the present day. Shortly after Chávez ordered the networks taken off the air, they were disconnected. However, a single engineer tricked DISIP and National Guard members into thinking he cut all transmission, though the networks continued to broadcast via satellite to cable, satellite and through other outlets. Private television stations shared a video of pro-government chavistas reportedly firing at protesters. Although who was responsible for the deaths remains unclear, the media aired the footage.

On 13 April, the media met with Carmona at Miraflores and denounced his decision to dissolve the National Assembly and arrest supporters of Chávez. Such opposition to Carmona's moves resulted in his Minister of Defense, Admiral Hector Ramirez Perez, stating that the media was "opposed" to Carmona's interim government. Carmona's minister of defense also called on the media to stop reporting the violence so it would not provoke more violent actions. The head of Globovisión reportedly called to CNN in Atlanta "to request the U.S. network join the blackout." Venezuelan television media failed to broadcast news of Chávez supporters retaking of the Miraflores palace; the four major television networks stopped providing news reports altogether. The St. Petersburg Times reported that "RCTV was showing Walt Disney cartoons. Venevisión ran a daylong marathon of Hollywood movies: Lorenzo's Oil, Nell and Pretty Woman. Another station, Televen, told its viewers 'to stay indoors,' treating them to baseball and soap operas. Globovisión, the country's top 24-hour news station and CNN affiliate, spent much of the day rebroadcasting upbeat footage of Chávez's ouster. An announcer repeatedly cautioned viewers, 'We are living in times of political change'" while also urging viewers to remain "prudent" and not to spread "false alarms" or "rumors". According to the media, such actions were performed for safety reasons since there were threats against the media organizations. Two of the three major newspapers El Universal and El Nacional cancelled their Sunday editions, for safety reasons. The third major newspaper, Últimas Noticias, printed a limited Sunday edition accurately reflecting events; some tabloids and regional television stations also covered the news. Chávez supporters on 13 April were also creating an intimidating atmosphere, attacking the offices of RCTV, breaking windows and shouting "The palace is in our hands, why aren't you showing that?". By 8 o'clock on 13 April, the reinstalled government informed the people of the situation, via state television channels. On 18 April, Globovisión president Alberto Ravell "asked for forgiveness 'from any viewer who feels we failed them that day'", further stating that "Sacrificing our credibility (...) and freedom of expression, we decided not to broadcast images of violence and looting."

== Aftermath ==
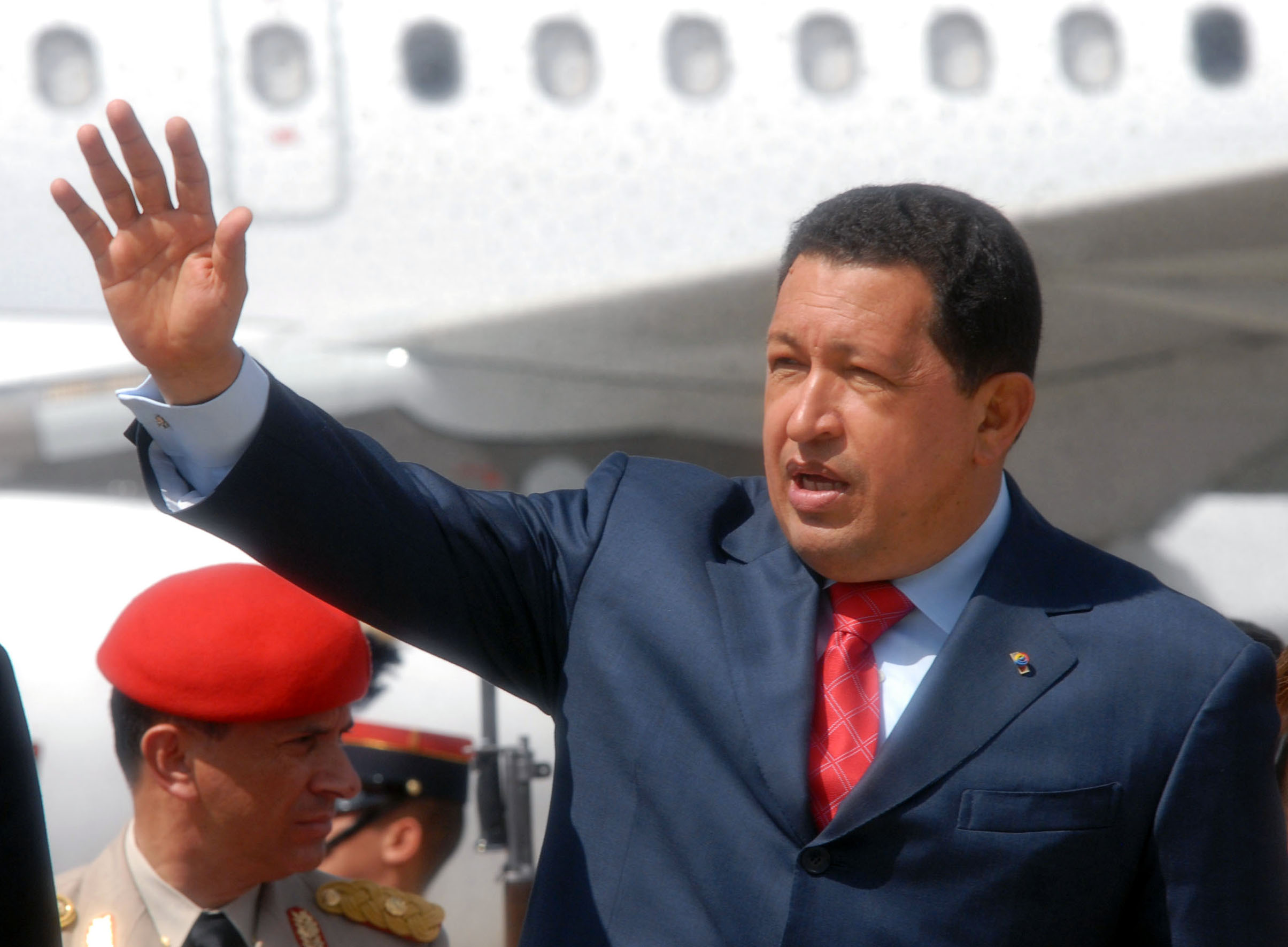
Venezuelan President Hugo Chávez in 2005

By the time the Organization of American States' (OAS) Permanent Council met on 13 April, the coup was effectively over, and on 14 April the United States joined with other OAS members in condemning the coup and sending the OAS Secretary General on a fact-finding and diplomatic mission. The OAS subsequently established a "mesa" dialogue process, as it had in Peru following the May 2000 elections. At Chávez's request, the Carter Center and UNDP were also involved. In order to facilitate participation in this process, the opposition created the Coordinadora Democrática (CD).

The CD helped organize the general strike of 2002–03 later. After the February 2003 end of the strike, the CD engaged further in the mesa process and pushed for a binding recall referendum, which was ultimately agreed on 23 May 2003. Ultimately the CD rejected the outcome of the 2004 recall referendum, which announced that Chávez would not be recalled, alleging fraud. On January 15, 2004, during a speech before the National Assembly, Chávez would afterwards admit that he deliberately provoked a crisis with this actions, declaring that "what happened with PDVSA was necessary" and "when I grabbed the whistle in an Aló Presidente and started to fire people, I was provoking the crisis".

=== Reactions ===
==== Domestic ====
Early on the morning after the coup, opponents of Chávez filled the streets of Caracas, "honking horns and waving the gold, blue and red of the Venezuelan flag", according to The New York Times. A headline in El Universal read "It's over!" Oscar Garcia Mendoza, president of the major Banco Venezolano de Crédito, ran a "gigantic newspaper ad" celebrating Chávez's ouster, which, he wrote, would "substantially improve Venezuelan society". "This is the day that Venezuelans have been waiting for", said Luis Vicente Leon, head of a Caracas polling firm. "The situation in Venezuela has changed overnight, not only politically but also economically." About 500 protesters gathered outside the Cuban embassy in Caracas demanding an end to diplomatic relations. Protesters cut the mission's utility cables, slashed tires, and smashed the windshields of three cars with diplomatic plates. Although the Cuban ambassador told a Venezuelan official that he was not sheltering any Venezuelans, he would not allow the building to be searched.

==== International ====
A Rio Group meeting of Latin American governments in Costa Rica taking place soon after the coup adopted a resolution condemning the "interruption of constitutional order in Venezuela", and requesting a meeting of the Organization of American States (OAS); only Francisco Flores of El Salvador said that he would recognise the Carmona government.

The United States government blamed the events on the actions of the Chávez government, and said Chávez had resigned the presidency, dismissed his cabinet, and that security forces under his command had fired upon unarmed protesters. Upon news of Chávez's return, Condoleezza Rice, the then National Security Advisor to US President George W. Bush, said, "We do hope that Chávez recognizes that the whole world is watching and that he takes advantage of this opportunity to right his own ship, which has been moving, frankly, in the wrong direction for quite a long time." Bush denied any involvement of the US government in the coup attempt and asked Chávez to "learn a lesson" from it.

Cuban president Fidel Castro later confirmed that after the coup his government had "contacted the ambassadors of 21 countries in an attempt to get a plane to Venezuela to rescue Chávez." In Chile, newspapers circulated information soon after the coup attempt showing the Chilean government's "discomfort" with Chávez returning to power, with President Ricardo Lagos holding Chávez accountable for the political crisis in Venezuela. President Lagos later clarified that his statements were to tell Venezuela to avoid polarization and the Chile opposes the "interruption of institutional order".

==== Organizations ====
Don McKay of the Canadian Foundation of the Americas was troubled by the coup, saying: "This is the first time in a decade the military has stepped into power in Latin America. It is very troubling. ... This will be a test case to see whether the OAS's democracy clause has any teeth." Cuban Foreign Relations Minister Felipe Pérez Roque said that in the eyes of his country Chávez was still president, and Cuba's Communist Party daily, Granma, wrote that Chávez had been "overthrown in a conspiracy by the country's wealthy classes, corrupt politicians and the news media".

On 13 April, the editors of The New York Times applauded what they described as Chávez's resignation, calling him a "ruinous demagogue" and cheering the fact that "Venezuelan democracy [was] no longer threatened by a would-be dictator". The Times editors also wrote admiringly of the installation of Carmona as president, describing him as a "respected business leader". Furthermore, the Times congratulated the U.S. government for its wisdom in "never [having] publicly demonized Mr. Chávez, denying him the role of nationalist martyr", and in staying out of the coup, which the Times characterized as "a purely Venezuelan affair".

=== US role and alleged involvement ===
President Chávez asserted numerous times that United States government officials knew about plans for a coup, approved of them, and assumed they would be successful, alleging that "two military officers from the United States" were present in the headquarters of coup plotters. Rear Admiral Carlos Molina, a central leader of the coup, later said: "We felt we were acting with US support ... we agree that we can't permit a communist government here. The US has not let us down yet." The United States repeatedly informed the Venezuelan opposition that they would not be supported if there were a coup, and following the coup attempt President Bush denied any US involvement.

On 27 April 2002, chairman Cass Ballenger and Congressman Bill Delahunt of the United States met with Venezuelan media heads of Venevisión, Globovisión, Unión Radio, El Nacional, Últimas Noticias, and El Mundo, telling them that "the U.S. was opposed to any disruption of constitutional government and would condemn any coup, open or disguised, aimed at ousting Chávez". At a meeting soon after the coup between Ambassador Shapiro and then Venezuelan Vice President José Vicente Rangel at the Vice President's home, Rangel also stated to Shapiro that "no one in the upper echelons of the Venezuelan government really believed that the United States was involved in the attempted overthrow" and that if the Venezuelan government did believe so, "the two men wouldn't have been sitting in Rangel's house". Unlike much of Latin America, the US refused to condemn the coup, changing its position only after Carmona resigned.

Unnamed Organisation of American States officials and other diplomatic sources told The Observer that the coup was "tied to senior officials in the US government" and that the US was not only aware of the coup, but also gave sanction to its organizers. The paper named Elliott Abrams, who had been convicted of deceiving Congress during the Iran Contra Affair, as having greenlit the coup. Bush administration officials acknowledged meeting with some opposition leaders in the several weeks prior to 11 April but have strongly denied encouraging the coup itself, saying that they insisted on constitutional means. The purpose of the meetings was not clarified, and it is not known why US officials and the Venezuelan opposition broached the subject of a coup months before the attempted ousting took place. The New York Times quotes an anonymous Defense Department official in charge of developing policy towards Venezuela as saying: "We were not discouraging people. ... We were sending informal, subtle signals that we don't like this guy. We didn't say, 'No, don't you dare'", though he denied the Defense Department offered material help, such as weaponry.

An investigation conducted by the US inspector general, requested by US Senator Christopher Dodd, reviewed American activities leading up to and during the coup attempt. The OIG report found no "wrongdoing" by US officials either in the State Department or in the embassy, and concluded: "While it is clear that NED's, DOD's, and other U.S. assistance programs provided training, institution building, and other support to organizations and individuals understood to be actively involved in the events of April 11–14, we found no evidence that this support directly contributed, or was intended to contribute, to those events. NED is, however, mindful of the fact that, in some circumstances, its efforts to assist specific organizations, or foster open elections, could be perceived as partisan."

=== Responsibility for violence ===
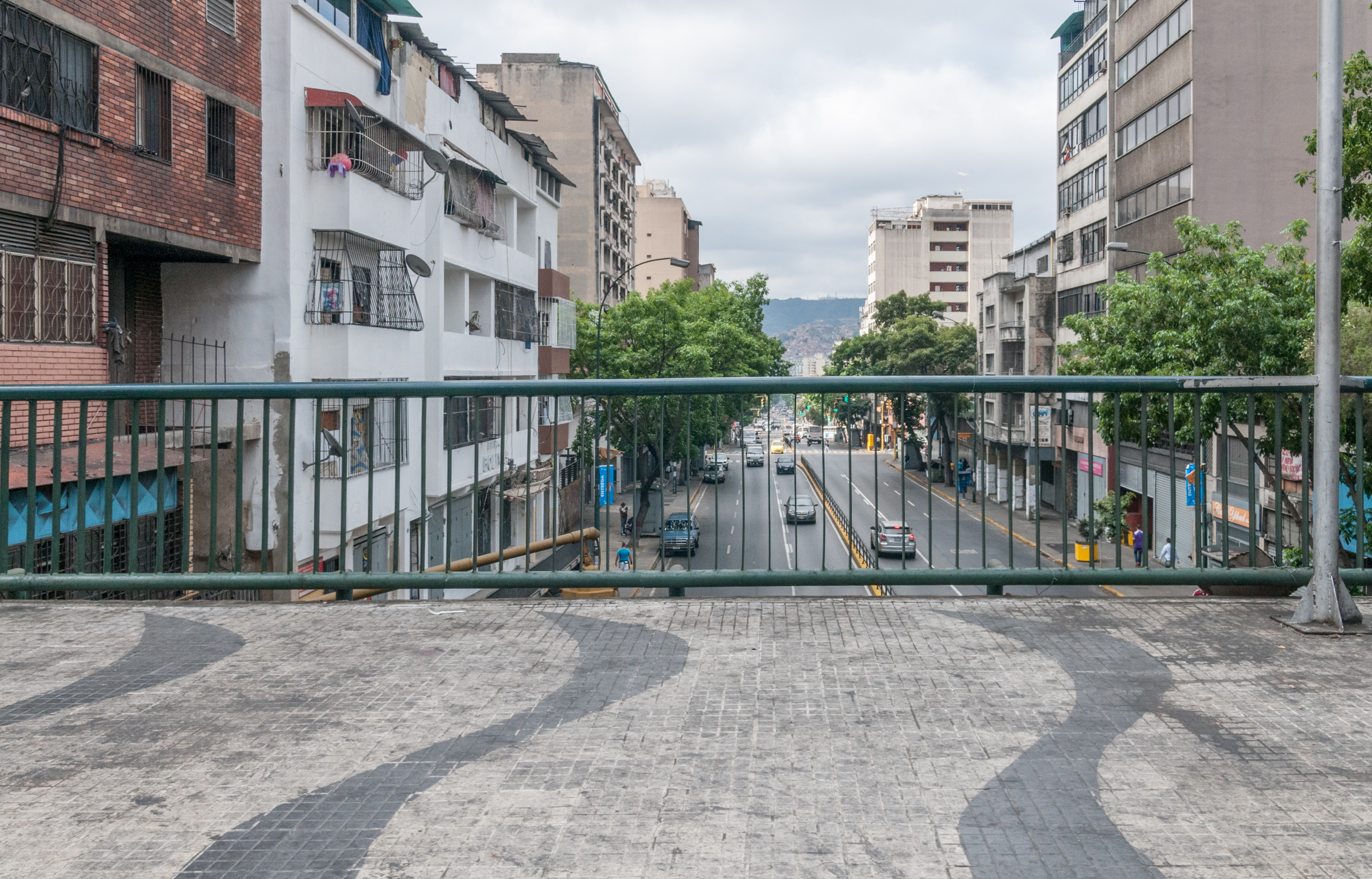
View from the Llaguno Overpass down to Baralt Avenue, where the majority of the violence took place.

External media

Images
- Gallery of the violence and other images related to the coup.

Video
- The shooting of opposition marcher Jesús Orlando Arellano by a pro-Chávez gunman, resulting in the first fatality of the day.
- Photographer Jorge Tortoza being shot and killed followed by protester Malvina Pesate being shot in the face from pro-Chávez crowd.
- Pro-Chávez gunman Erasmo Sánchez being carried away after being shot by returning fire from the Metropolitan Police. He was the reportedly the first pro-Chávez fatality of the day.

The majority of the violence that took place on 11 April 2002 was near the Llaguno Overpass. There is no consensus as to who was responsible for the deaths on that day, and this remains a very controversial issue. The opposition version of events puts the blame on Chávez, or at least on his supporters. Many groups of the Bolivarian Circles gathered near the Llaguno Overpass before the march reached the area. A Venevisión camera positioned on a rooftop that afternoon captured images of people using handguns to shoot from the pro-Chávez counter-march being held on the Llaguno Overpass, an overpass that crosses one of central Caracas's busiest avenues. A number of high-ranking military officers, led by Vice Admiral Héctor Ramírez, recorded a video message broadcast later in the day that held Chávez responsible for massacring innocent people using snipers, referring to at least six dead and dozens wounded. CNN correspondent Otto Neustald Neustald claimed the message was recorded at least two hours before the killings started. However, this claim has never been proven and is contested by the rest of the reporters present, such as Javier Ignacio Mayorca, Mayela León and Adrián Criscaut, who affirmed that the military officers were informed of the death of Tortoza during the filming of the message.

Several witnesses reported seeing people shooting from two specific locations: the Ausonia Hotel and the Eden Hotel. The head of the Casa Militar at the time, the guard of the president of Venezuela, Colonel Almidien Ramon Moreno Acosta, states in a report presented on May 15, 2002, before the National Assembly that ten suspects were detained on April 11 under the accusation of being snipers. Three of them were captured by a group of unidentified citizens and handed over to Casa Militar. There were no reports as to whether any firearms were seized from them. The remaining seven were captured directly by officers of the Guardia de Honor, the Casa Militar.

The seven individuals were fully identified because they had registered with their real names at the Ausonia Hotel. Only one of them was carrying an unfired .38 caliber weapon. On April 12 they were handed over to the Prosecutor's Office and tried in court, but were released because there was insufficient evidence to charge them. The revolver had not been fired and no traces were found on any part of the detainees' bodies or clothing. The La Nacional building housed the offices of pro-Chávez mayor Freddy Bernal. Bernal, a Chávez supporter and former leader of an elite police force, was accused by a Venezuelan military officer of complying with orders from the Defense Ministry to shoot opposition demonstrators. It was also reported that the National Guard, which was firing tear gas and combatting the opposition protesters, did not pay any attention to the gunmen on the La Nacional building and that it was the Metropolitan Police who had attempted to go to the building. Bernal dismissed the allegations as "totally false".

The 2003 documentary titled The Revolution Will Not Be Televised contradicts claims by private media in Venezuela that the pro-Chávez group was firing on the opposition protest from Llaguno Bridge. In the documentary, footage captured from another angle by an amateur cameraman shows pro-Chávez gunmen firing over an empty street with no apparent opposition protesters below. Further, the film makers claim that the opposition march never went down that street. This documentary has been criticized by another called X-Ray of a Lie and American academic Brian Nelson, who argue that the footage is manipulated and obscures Metropolitan Police on the street below. The 2004 documentary Puente Llaguno: Claves de una Masacre claimed that the Chavistas on the bridge did not begin shooting until 4:38 pm, by which time most of the opposition deaths had already occurred. Nelson responds that such claims are false by showing that opposition demonstrator Jesús Arellano was killed just before 2:30 pm, with photos showing Chavistas further up the street brandishing firearms and closer than purported by the earlier sources.

Within the next 15 minutes, two other opposition demonstrators were shot at 2:45 and 4:30 pm, the Metropolitan Police responded to the Chavista gunfire by going between the marchers and the Chavistas. The Chavistas responded to the Metropolitan Police by moving further up the street and at around 4:35 pm, began firing down from Llaguno Bridge onto Baralt Avenue below. Police responded to the Chavista gunfire, with one Chavista who was lying on the bridge being shot in the face, with his body positioning of lying down and facing the Metropolitan Police below possibly resulting in the headshot. Ricochets were also possible from Chavistas ranks firing through the spokes of the railing on the bridge. After 5:30 pm when most of the gunfire concluded, the filmmakers of The Revolution Will Not Be Televised used manipulated footage in order to show an empty Baralt Avenue that Chavistas were overlooking. A vehicle used by the Metropolitan Police later showed that approximately 600 bullets impacted the vehicle's side that was facing north toward the Puente Llaguno bridge.

==== Scene cleanup ====
After 11 April, the Baralt Avenue was closed as a crime scene and remained closed while Carmona was in power. However, upon Chávez's return on 14 April, cleaning crews under the orders of Freddy Bernal, mayor of the Libertador Municipality and leader of the Bolivarian Circles, began to fix the damages in the street. The crews swiftly repaired the traffic lights, restored the kiosks, painted the walls, covered the splinters in the cement surfaces and replaced the damaged street lamps free of charge. Workers removed bullets from the walls and scoured the drains for shell casings as well. Within five days, all physical evidence at the site had been collected and destroyed, and on April 20 the avenue was reopened. The Chávez government proceeded to transfer detectives and prosecutors who opened investigations and replace them with more submissive supporters.

==== Criminal investigation ====
The people filmed shooting from the Puente Llaguno bridge were initially identified as being pro-Chávez political activists Rafael Cabrices, Richard Peñalver, Henry Atencio, and Nicolás Rivera. They were captured by the police and jailed for one year as they awaited trial, but charges were dropped before the trial began. Cabrices died from a heart attack three years later, in August 2005. Atencio died fifteen years later, in May 2017. Peñalver died during the 2026 Venezuela earthquakes after his home collapsed. Under the 1999 Constitution, military officers are entitled to a pre-trial hearing before the Plenary of the Supreme Court of Justice to rule on whether they should be charged with a crime. In such a hearing on 14 August 2002, the Tribunal ruled by an 11–9 margin (with two justices recused) that four high-ranking military officers charged with rebellion should not stand trial, arguing that what took place was not a "coup" but a "vacuum of power" that had been generated by the announcement of Chávez's resignation made by General Lucas Rincón Romero.

After Chávez took over of the Supreme Tribunal of Justice and filled it with his supporters, the Constitutional Chamber of the Supreme Court, however, ruled on 12 March 2004 that the recusals were unconstitutional, making the hearing invalid, which meant that the military officers, by then retired, should stand trial. After a trial that had begun in March 2006, in April 2009, the ten Metropolitan Police officers were convicted of crimes leading to the deaths of three demonstrators on 11 April 2002. Six of them were convicted and sentenced to 30 years each in prison, while one officer was acquitted. Former president of the Venezuelan Supreme Tribunal of Justice, Eladio Aponte Aponte, who fled Venezuela in 2012 after the Venezuelan government accused him of alleged ties to drug trafficking and removed him from his post, told U.S. authorities that he was personally ordered by President Chávez to use the full weight of the court to condemn the officers.

On 18 November 2004, a leading state prosecutor, Danilo Anderson, was assassinated shortly before he was scheduled to bring charges against individuals for their alleged participation in the coup. The Venezuelan government claimed individuals from Florida planned the assassination, though other reports suggested that Anderson and others were involved in an extortion racket. Carmona was arrested on 16 April and later placed under house arrest. He would later request political asylum to the Colombian embassy in Caracas. Carmona and several other participants went into exile. In December 2007, Chávez issued a pardon covering more than 60 people who had drafted or signed the Carmona Decree.

=== Media ===
==== Analysis ====
Before the coup, the relationship between Chávez's government and the media were in dispute over press freedom, with the Venezuelan government threatening to revoke licenses of media organizations. Venezuelan media officials stated that the majority of the media supported Chávez and the change he promised when originally elected in 1998, but after they reported the "negative realities" occurring in Venezuela, the Venezuelan government began to portray the media as an enemy. After Chávez removed many of the traditional political elements that were barriers to his power, the Venezuelan media, like other forms of media in Latin America, began to criticize the government.

In 2001 and 2002, relations between the media and Chávez deteriorated quickly. The Chávez-controlled Supreme Court ruled in June 2001 that the media could be held accountable for "half-truths", a ruling which Chávez used to threaten media organizations by saying he would be revoking their licenses. As conformations began to grow, both parties became more biased, with media owners down to reporters feeling threatened with Chávez even calling out individual journalists by name in speeches. By January 2002, Chávez supporters were attacking independent reporters, with the headquarters of El Universal assaulted by hundreds of Chavistas, Globovisión reporters attacked while they were attempting to record Aló Presidente and a bomb attack on newspaper Así Es la Noticia. As a result of being "besieged" by Chávez, the media lost its perspective and began to increase its political involvement assisting the opposition.

According to Le Monde diplomatique, mainstream Venezuelan media outlets such as El Universal, El Nacional, El Nuevo País, Globovisión, Televen, CMT and RCTV supported the coup and anti-government demonstrations, accusing the media of only disseminating the anti-Chávez point of view in the news reports of international media agencies and organizations. Following the coup attempt, the Venezuelan media was blamed as being a major contributor to the unrest in Venezuela with one Foreign Policy article, supporting the statements by Le Monde diplomatique about the media's involvement, stating, "Never in the history of Latin America had the media played quite so prominent a role in facilitating the overthrow of a democratically elected government," noting that "the majority of private outlets in Venezuela were owned by wealthy families with an interest in ousting Chávez." Senior Research Fellow for the leftist thinktank Council on Hemispheric Affairs Such allegations of Venezuelan media owners' active involvement in the coup has never been proven, but the media's actions in supporting the anti-Chávez movements hurt its credibility in the future.

Media outlets denied allegations of any political bias or involvement, stating that coverage was impeded by the confusion of the coup. This included the confusion from rumors such as "Chávez had resigned, been arrested, was fleeing to Cuba, that the military had revolted, that the military high command had resigned" as well as the violent targeting of media personnel that left six cameramen shot, with one of those mortally wounded. Media outlets that both opposed and supported Chávez reported difficulties in reporting due to the potential danger their reporters faced, stating that journalists were afraid to cover pro-Chávez demonstrations since the media was targeted. Venevison reported that only 5 of 18 reporters went out to cover events during the coup while a newspaper considered pro-Chávez stated that they had to remove their logo from cars so they would not be attacked by Chávez supporters. It was also reported that the Chávez supporting Bolivarian Circles surrounded media buildings which prevented their reporters from leaving the area. According to a declassified document from the United States State Department, then-Congressmen Cass Ballenger and William Delahunt met with five media outlet owners and presidents following the coup attempt to encourage the media "to contribute to a climate that would make possible the dialogue and reconciliation that President Chávez has called for." The media owners and presidents, who admitted there may have been mistakes during the coup attempt, said "the media is democratic" and was opposed to any coup. The media officials also stated that they were attempting to give Chávez a second chance but remained skeptical, noting his 14 April speeches after returning to power where he admitted errors and asked for forgiveness, but later gave a "fiery speech" where he said to his supporters that those responsible for the coup attempt, including the media, "must pay".

==== Media changes ====
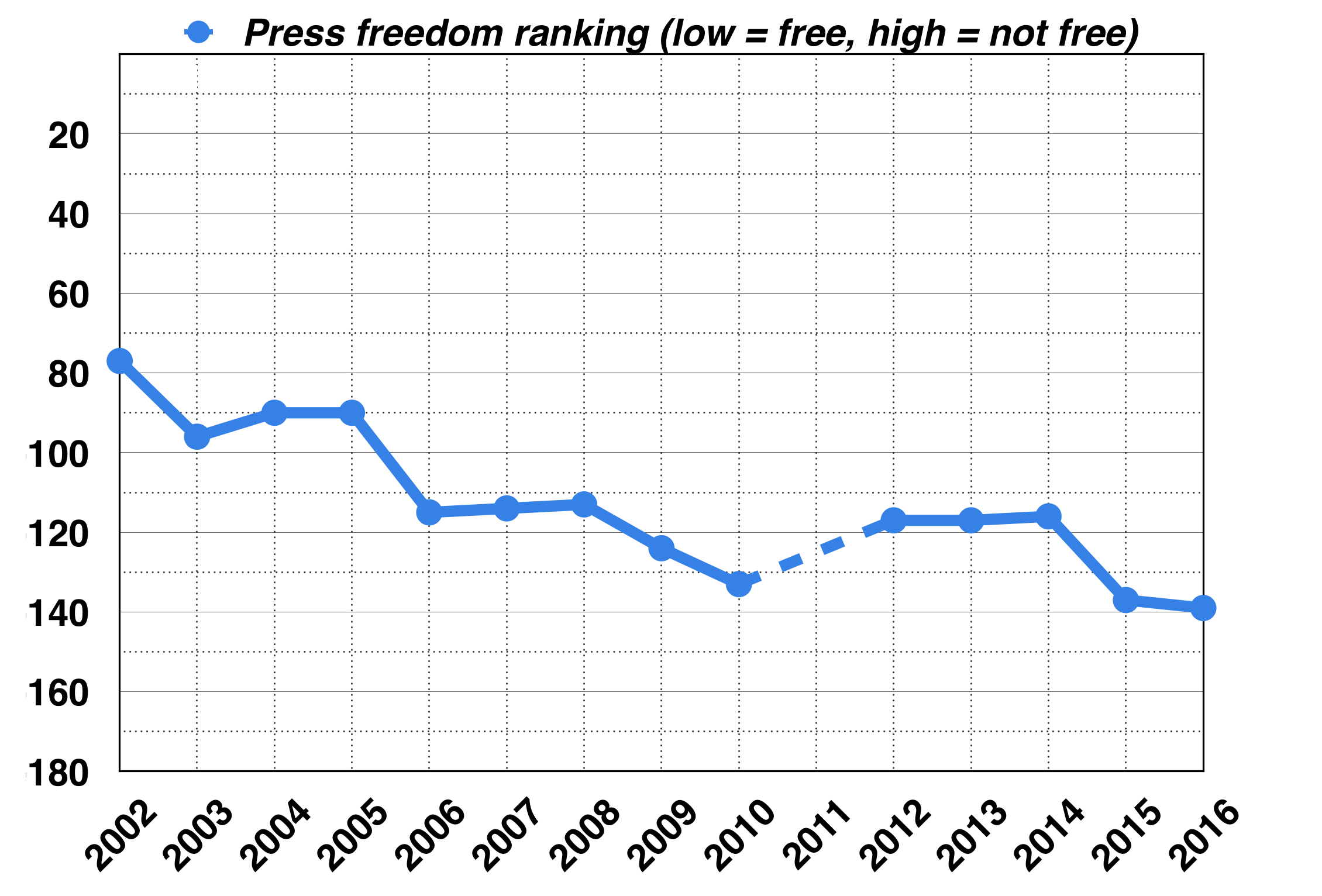
Annual World Press Freedom Index rankings of Venezuela from Reporters Without Borders. Source: Reporters Without Borders

Chávez said after his reinstatement as president, "This coup d'etat would not have been possible without the help of the news media, especially television", and began a campaign to establish a "media hegemony" to prevent similar media conduct from happening in the future. To do so, Chávez used a "two-pronged strategy" in which his government strengthened its own media and "closed, browbeaten or infiltrated almost every independent outlet". In 2004, the Law on Social Responsibility on Radio and Television was passed, allowing the government to censor media in order to "promote social justice and further the development of the citizenry, democracy, peace, human rights, education, culture, public health, and the nation's social and economic development". The law, which was extended to the Internet and social media in 2010, requires media companies to "establish mechanisms to restrict, without delay, the dissemination of messages."

Violators of the law can be fined up to US$3,000 or 10 percent of one's yearly income, or face suspension of service, while journalists can be arrested with vague charges, including "conspiracy against the state" for criticizing the government. In 2007, Chávez announced the shutdown of television broadcaster RCTV, and other stations began toning down dissent to avoid a similar end. In 2009, 34 radio stations were closed for "technical and administrative reasons". By the time of Chávez's death in 2013, he left a transformed media atmosphere in Venezuela with the media organizations that opposed him being silenced and an expanding state media as a result. Media workers face legal barriers, defamation lawsuits from Venezuelan officials, and violence.

== Documentary films ==
The Revolution Will Not Be Televised, also known as Chávez: Inside the Coup, is a 2003 documentary Irish production, which focuses on events in Venezuela leading up to and during the April 2002 coup d'état attempt, which saw Chávez removed from office for several days. The film focuses on Venezuela's private media and examines multiple incidents, including the opposition's formation of an interim government, headed by Pedro Carmona; and the Carmona administration's collapse. X-Ray of a Lie, a 2004 documentary made by Venezuelan citizens Wolfgang Schalk and Thaelman Urgelles, describes omissions and distortions in The Revolution Will Not Be Televised.

== See also ==
- Plaza Altamira military
- The Silence and the Scorpion

== Bibliography ==
- Nelson, Brian A. (2009). The silence and the scorpion : the coup against Chávez and the making of modern Venezuela (online ed.). New York: Nation Books. pp. 40–41. ISBN 978-1568584188.
- Nelson, Brian A. (2012). El Silencio y el Escorpión. Caracas: Alfa. ISBN 9789803543242.
