= Discourse of power =

The discourse of power is used when it comes to differentiating the levels of power due to cultural and social characteristics that come about through societal upbringing. The ways we think and talk about a subject influence and reflect the ways we act in relation to that subject. The idea of the discourse of power within media has a domino effect and it can play a huge role in determining the patterns of access to the mass media: who has preferential access to journalists, who will be interviewed, who will be quoted and described in news reports, and whose opinions will influence the public? Through access to the mass media, dominant groups also may have access to and partial control over the public at large.

== The role of mass media and power in the United States ==
Those with power and influence know that media control or influence is crucial. A free press is crucial for a functioning democracy, but if not truly free, paves the way for manipulation and concentration of views, thus undermining democracy itself. The First Amendment to the U.S Constitution, which provides that "Congress shall make no law...abridging the freedom of speech, or of the press," has given the media an exceptionally strong basis for resisting government controls in the United States. A limited number of controls, such as regulatory laws, court decisions, and informational social pressures guard against excess by the media. In the United States courts have been loath to impose restraints prior to publication, such as granting injunctions that would stop publication of information on the grounds that it would cause irreparable harm.

=== Major mass media conglomerates in the United States ===
- Walt Disney Company
- News Corporation
- Time Warner
- CBS Corporation
- Viacom
- General Electric

These media conglomerates control 90% of the traditional media that is present in our daily lives, media has never been more consolidated.

== Power of media versus reality ==
The shaping of ones reality or perception is based on three elements including experienced reality, symbolic reality, and socially constructed reality. Much of the symbolic reality is based on media practices that we are exposed to daily. Individuals make assumptions on the world based on what their media tells them. The media is a hegemonic form of power that maintains their position, not through force, but through elaboration of a particular world view, an ideology, or a particular notion of common sense, which is widely infused into everyday cultural practices. This results in people consenting to power even when it may not be in their best interest. The assumption of media hegemony is that the ideas of the ruling class become ruling ideas in society, because of this the mass media are controlled by the dominant class in society which uses it as a vehicle for exerting control over the rest of society.

=== Socially constructed reality ===
Social construct examines the development of jointly constructed understandings of the world. It assumes that understanding, significance, and meaning are developed not separately within the individual, but in coordination among other human beings. To say that something is socially constructed is to emphasize its dependence on contingent aspects of individuals' social selves. It can say this thing could not have existed had we not built it. Had someone been brought up in a different kind of society, had different needs, values, or interests, an individual might have built a different kind of thing, or this social construct differently. It is important to be aware that the values individuals hold, the beliefs they harbor and the decisions they make are based on their assumptions, experiences, education and what they know for a fact. A social construct allows individuals to rely on mass media for the current news and facts about what is important and what they should be aware of. The media is trusted as an authority for news, information, education and entertainment. Considering that powerful influence, then, we should know how it really works. The degree of influence depends on the availability and pervasiveness of media. Traditional mass media still has a great influence within society today. Books once were supremely influential because they came first before newspapers, magazines, radio or television. Newspapers and magazines became large influencers after they were developed. Sound recordings and film were and still are influential. Radio and then television were very influential. As the 20th century closed, TV exposed us to a number of new examples advertising and marketing, suffering and relief, sexuality and violence, celebrity entertainment, and much more. New and influential media-distribution channels have appeared in the 21st century. We are currently being influenced through the internet by daily by blogs, popular culture websites and various social media outlets.

=== Experienced reality ===
Experienced reality is that reality that comes to us via the senses and also via insight or intuition. It underlies all of our cognitive efforts. Because direct experience is largely sensory, automatic and constant, we pay less attention to it than the reality we have to work at to construct. It is somewhat of an illusion that effort equates to importance in our culture. Events or experiences spark change in an individual. Through societal influence we are becoming a generation that needs to see to believe, and experienced reality is what initiates this idea. Power through this idea of experienced reality is relayed through the ideologies of the major media conglomerates and the way that they have created such a large cultural bias towards what we have experienced.

=== Symbolic reality ===
Symbols exist everywhere for an individual. Symbols are the intermediary between the world internal and the world external, between inner and external reality of human being as a person. The appeal to symbolic reality allows us to overcome personal boundaries including power struggles. Symbolic reality exists in and through person. Symbols are objects, characters, or other representations of ideas, concepts, or abstractions; they are the universal language in a culture. Symbols have been used for thousands of years, they help individuals communicate and interact with one another. Thus, as a representation, their meaning is neither instinctive nor automatic. The culture’s members must interpret, and over time reinterpret, Symbols convey meaning and occur in different forms, such as: verbal or nonverbal, written or unwritten, words on the page, drawings, pictures, gesture. They are things which act as triggers to remind people, in the culture, of its rules, beliefs… Symbols can also be used to indicate status within a culture. Every society has evolved a system of symbols that reflects a specific cultural logic; and every symbolism functions to communicate information between members in much the same way as, but more subtly than, conventional language. Due to the level of power, media conglomerates have been using symbolic reality to relay their messages for years.
