= Interim government of Juan Guaidó =

Interim government of Venezuela

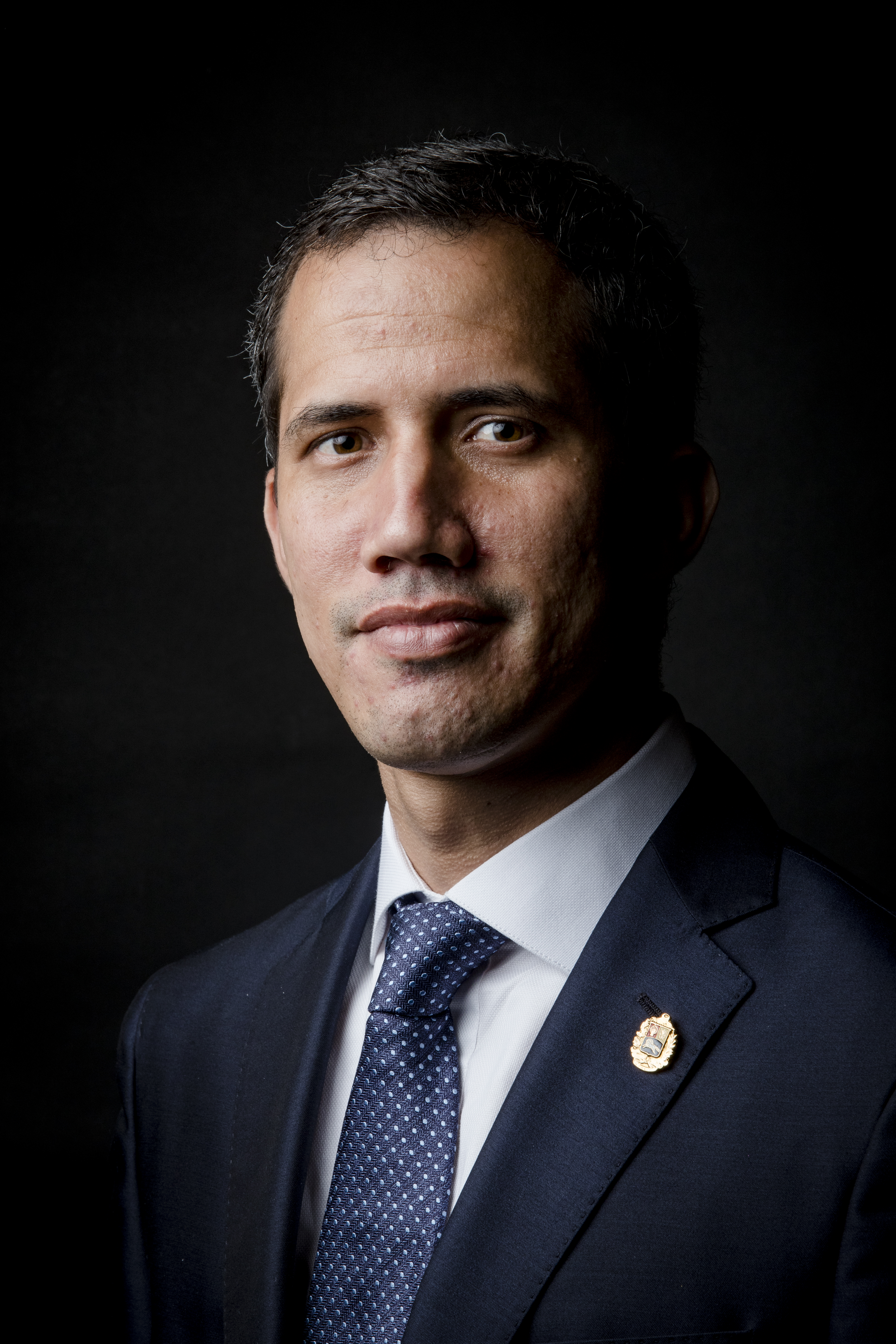
- Interim government of Juan Guaidó; 23 January 2019 – 5 January 2023
- Cabinet: Full list
- Party: Popular Will (Left that party in 2020)
- Election: 2018 (and ensuing crisis)
- Presidential Seal

The Interim government of Juan Guaidó (Spanish: Gobierno interino de Juan Guaidó), known as Centro de Gobierno (Centre of Government), was a disputed interim government established by Juan Guaidó as acting president of Venezuela, lasting from 23 January 2019 to 5 January 2023. Its headquarters was initially in the Spanish embassy in Caracas, where its director Leopoldo López lived at the time.

The disputed interim government held little power in Venezuela but did control international assets, because the U.S. and about 60 other countries considered him the acting President.

According to Guaidó, the government would coordinate among members of his cabinet on their policies, whose members were referred to as "presidential commissioners".

On 30 December 2022, the opposition-controlled National Assembly approved of the dissolution of the interim government, which was dissolved six days later on 5 January 2023.

== Formation ==
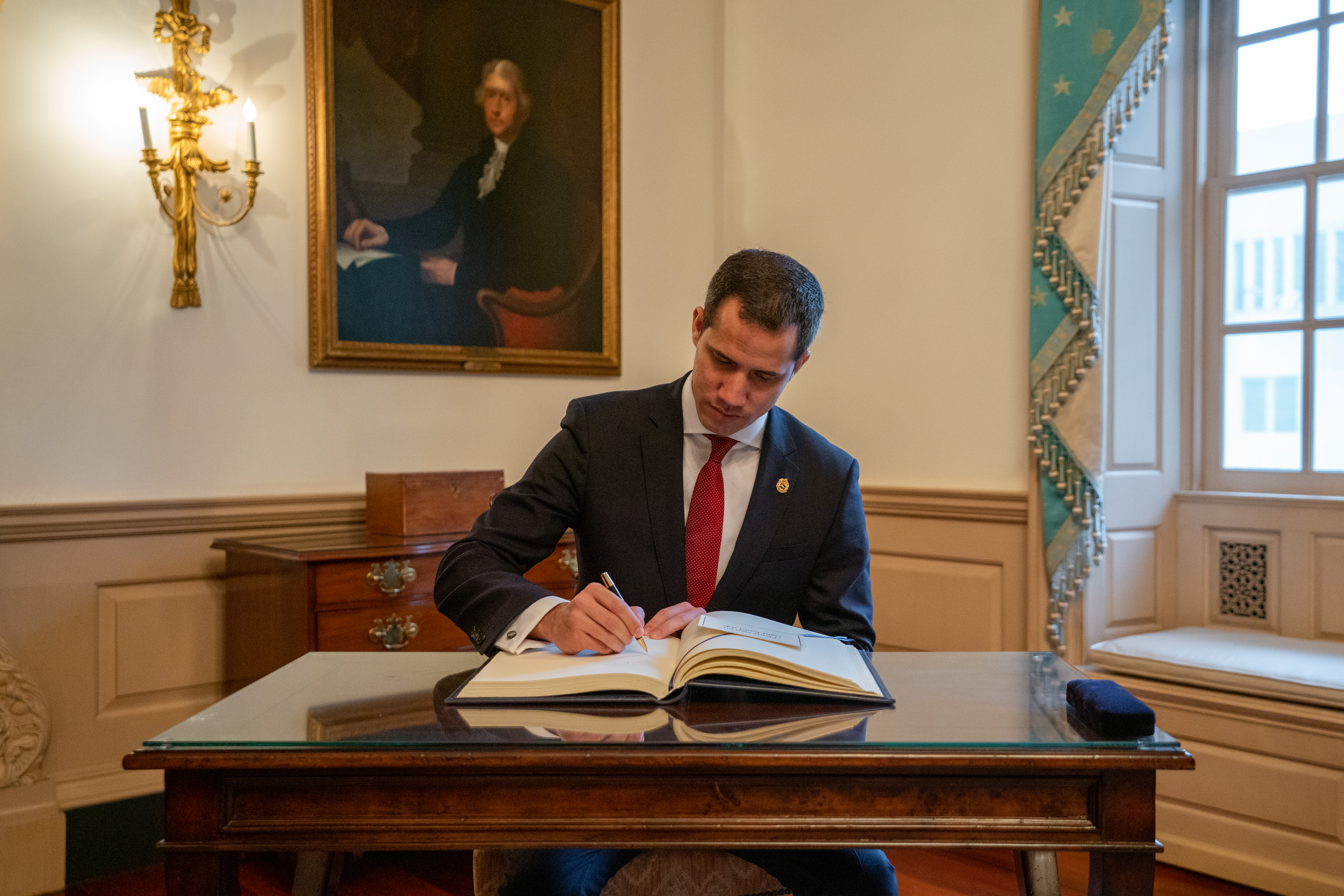
Guaidó signs the guest book as interim president at the U.S. State Department in Washington, D.C. in 2020.

On 23 January 2019, Juan Guaidó declared himself interim president at an opposition rally, sparking the Venezuelan presidential crisis.

On 28 August 2019, Guaidó announced the formation of the Centro de Gobierno as "a space for coordination" and that it will be done to "not interfere with the rules of the [Spanish] Embassy". He appointed Leopoldo López, the leader of his Popular Will party, as the leader of this institution.

According to a law approved on 26 December 2020, a political council would be created that is responsible for "coordinating, monitoring, and evaluating the actions of the interim presidency" and subject to parliamentary oversight to ensure a "free, fair, and verifiable elections", along with the "full restoration of constitutional order and separation of powers". The council will "establish its own regulations" but regulated by the interim president through decree. The council may also "give priority to the ordinary expenses of the Legislative Branch and the defense of Venezuelan state assets abroad".

The Inter-American Development Bank uses the term "Centro de Gobierno" and defines it as an institution that monitors and supports the actions of a head of state.

== Finances ==
After Guaidó was sworn in as President, U.S. Secretary of State Mike Pompeo expressed support for the "transition to a democratic government with free elections" for Venezuela, and announced a plan to grant more than $20 million USD to the new government as humanitarian aid amidst the crisis in Venezuela.

The opposition-controlled National Assembly allocated funds controlled by the Office of Foreign Assets Control towards the interim government to be used for defending the country's assets abroad, such as Citgo, which is a subsidiary of the state-owned PDVSA. On 25 January 2019, the National Assembly authorized Guaidó to control banking accounts of the government and the Central Bank of Venezuela, which amounted to about $340 million USD.

In April 2019, Juan Guaidó paid off the US$71 million in interest due on the PDVSA2020 bonds. The new board of directors is proposing a new refinancing with bonds maturing in 2020.

In the following years, the National Assembly approved the budget of the interim government with partial financing from the Office of Foreign Assets Control. In 2020, this amounted to $80 million ($61.6 million from OFAC), in 2021 was $152.4 million ($72 million OFAC), and in 2022 was $56.6 million ($54.8 million OFAC).

In 2020, several funds were used by Guaidó administration to help health workers during the COVID-19 pandemic in Venezuela.

In August 2022, three law firms issued an ultimatum to the Venezuelan opposition due to outstanding legal fees for representing Citgo during litigation, which exceeded $63 million since 2019. Attorney General Sánchez Falcón asserted that his administration had paid $28 million to law firms to handle these international cases with $18 million outstanding, while the previous Attorney General, José Ignacio Hernández, paid $16 million.

On 9 February 2023, Manuel Rodríguez, the acting president of the board of directors of the Central Bank of Venezuela, gave the 2022 annual report to the National Assembly, stating that the central bank has recovered more than $346.9 million in assets over three years regarding the accounts held at the Federal Reserve Bank in New York.

== Dissolution ==
On 5 January 2023, the interim presidency came to an end and was dissolved. The National Assembly then elected Dinorah Figuera from Justice First party as president, accompanied by Marianela Fernández from Un Nuevo Tiempo and Auristela Vásquez from Democratic Action as vice presidents. All three were in exile, with two in Spain and one in the United States.

== See also ==
- Venezuelan presidential crisis
- Roberto Marrero
- Interim government of Pedro Carmona, prior anti-Chavismo rival government in Venezuela
