= The Silence and the Scorpion =

2009 book by Brian A. Nelson

- Cover of the book
- Author: Brian A. Nelson
- Language: English; Spanish
- Subject: 2002 Venezuelan coup attempt
- Publisher: Nation Books
- Publication date: 2009
- Media type: Print
- Pages: 341
- ISBN: 1568586868

The Silence and the Scorpion (Spanish: El Silencio y el Escorpión) is a book written by Brian A. Nelson and published in 2009 about the 2002 Venezuelan coup attempt.

== Book ==
American academic Brian A. Nelson came into contact with Venezuela since 1989, learning about its contemporary history, and returned to the country in mid-2002 to research about the events of the April 2002 Venezuelan coup attempt. Nelson's perspective, initially a strong supporter of President Hugo Chávez, gradually shifted after conducting multiple interviews and researching about the events.

== Reception ==
The book was described by Alfonso Molina in his book 2002, el año que vivimos en las calles, as "one of the most complete investigations on the 2002 coup attempt, as well as one of the most consulted texts on the subject". It was chosen as one of Economist's Books of the Year in 2009.
