= Guaicaipuro Lameda =

Brigadier General

Guaicaipuro Lameda Montero (born 6 August 1954 in Barquisimeto, Venezuela) is a brigadier general in the Venezuelan Army and an electrical engineer. He graduated from the University of the Pacific, Stockton, California, United States.

== Life and professional career ==
He earned a degree in military arts and sciences in the Military academy of Venezuela in 1974, ranking first in his class, obtaining numerical record for 40 years, said institución. Is Electrical Engineering graduated from University of the Pacific with distinction magna cum laude, was appointed for 3 years running in the national list of the deans of America, to be located at 10% of top students at American universities. It has a Graduate economic planning and a Masters in National Security and Defence.

In his professional career in the Armed Forces of Venezuela he was Head of the Central Planning Bureau CAVIM also occupied the General Secretariat CAVIM and the Budget the Ministry of Defense.

In government he served as head of the central budget office (OCEPRE) and was appointed by president Hugo Chavez as president of the state owned oil company PDVSA in October 2000. The appointment was rescinded in February 2002.

== See also ==
- Robert Carmona-Borjas
