= Robert Carmona-Borjas =

Venezuelan lawyer

Robert Carmona-Borjas is a Venezuelan-American lawyer, academic, and writer. He currently holds a faculty position at American University in Washington, D.C. and has previously taught at George Washington University. Carmona-Borjas is recognized for his work in addressing issues of governability, defending human rights, promoting democracy, and fighting against corruption. In addition to his teaching career, he has authored multiple books and serves as a columnist for various newspapers, including Financial Times, Forbes, The Hill, International Policy Digest, Business Insider, Modern Diplomacy, Foreign Policy Journal, El Nuevo Herald (Miami), El Heraldo (Honduras), El Universal (Venezuela), La Prensa (Nicaragua), Tiempo Latino (Washington) and the Venezuelan TV network Globovisión and La Patilla.

Following the events that transpired in April 2002, during which Carmona-Borjas played a role in drafting the decree that reinstated the powers of the state, which had been illegally dissolved by Pedro Carmona Estanga, he sought political asylum in the United States. Carmona-Borjas co-founded the Arcadia Foundation, an anti-corruption non-governmental organization (NGO), together with Ugandan human rights activist Betty Oyella Bigombe.

International Criminal Court (Venezuela I)

In September 2024, Carmona‑Borjas, a formally recognized victim in the Venezuela I situation acting together with the Arcadia Foundation, initiated efforts to disqualify ICC Prosecutor Karim Asad Ahmad Khan on Ethical Corruption (conflict‑of‑interest) grounds. On 12 November 2024, the Registry transmitted to the Appeals Chamber a “Request for Recusal of the Prosecutor” filed by Carmona‑Borjas and Arcadia; on 10 February 2025 the Appeals Chamber dismissed that request for lack of standing. On 8 April 2025, the Registry transmitted Robert Carmona‑Borjas's “Judicial Integrity in Peril — Request for the Appeals Chamber to Conduct an Ex Officio Review of the Prosecutor's Conflict of Interest in the Venezuela I Situation.” Following that filing, on 1 August 2025 the Appeals Chamber held that “there are reasons to believe that a ground for disqualification of the Prosecutor exists” and instructed him, pursuant to Rule 35, to request excusal within three weeks, expressly reserving other legal avenues should circumstances require. On 2 September 2025, the ICC ad hoc Presidency granted the Prosecutor's excusal from the Venezuela I situation. The Appeals Chamber's decision also records that Venkateswari Alagendra—the Prosecutor's sister‑in‑law—was present and made oral submissions for Venezuela at the 7–8 November 2023 Article 18(2) appeal hearing. These developments were reported internationally, including by The Washington Post and the Associated Press.

In 2026, Carmona-Borjas published Even Silence Has a Witness: The Whitewashing of Ethical Corruption at the International Criminal Court, a legal-institutional account of the Venezuela I recusal proceedings. In the book, Carmona-Borjas characterises the Khan–Alagendra controversy as an instance of "ethical corruption", a term he uses to describe the alleged toleration of a visible appearance of compromised impartiality rather than bribery or financial corruption. The work focuses on the sequence between the February 2025 standing-based dismissal of the recusal request and the Appeals Chamber's later ex officio decision of 1 August 2025, which found reason to believe that a ground for the Prosecutor's disqualification existed and instructed Khan to seek excusal under Rule 35.

== Career ==
Carmona-Borjas taught at the Simon Bolivar University in Venezuela. He is known for addressing the issue of governability, the defense of human rights, democracy and the fight against corruption.

He is the co-founder of the Arcadia Foundation, an anti-corruption foundation aiming to promote the values of rule of law and democracy in politically tumultuous regions of the world. The organization has worked in Honduras, Colombia, Venezuela, Uganda and the United States. Arcadia has recently allocated focus to the corruption occurring within Honduras' Hondutel, and pressed for criminal charges. He has uncovered Marcelo Chimirri's activities. Marcelo Chimirri is the nephew of Manuel Zelaya Rosales.

In November 2024, the Arcadia Foundation and Robert Carmona‑Borjas submitted a request to the ICC Appeals Chamber seeking the Prosecutor's recusal in the Venezuela I situation; the Chamber dismissed the request in February 2025 on standing grounds.

Following an ex officio review submitted by Robert Carmona-Borjas on March 24, 2025, on 1 August 2025 the Appeals Chamber held that “there are reasons to believe that a ground for disqualification of the Prosecutor exists” and instructed him to seek excusal within three weeks (ICC‑02/18‑118, dispositive paras. 1–2). The ad hoc ICC Presidency granted the Prosecutor's request to be excused from the Venezuela I situation on 2 September 2025 (ICC‑02/18‑125). These developments were widely reported by international media.

== Books ==
- Carmona-Borjas, Robert (1994). Cuba: asedios, utopías y otros bloqueos [Cuba: Sieges, Utopias and Other Blockades] (in Spanish). Mexico: Vestigios.
- Carmona-Borjas, Robert (April 2009). Más allá de la génesis del 11 de abril [Beyond the Genesis of 11 April] (in Spanish). Alexandria Library.
- Carmona-Borjas, Robert. Diccionario integral de derechos humanos, migración, asilo, refugio y protección subsidiaria: enfoque multidisciplinario de aplicación universal [Comprehensive Dictionary of Human Rights, Migration, Asylum, Refuge and Subsidiary Protection: A Multidisciplinary Approach of Universal Application] (in Spanish). Vol. 3 vols. Editorial Arcadia. ISBN 9798254682660.
- Carmona-Borjas, Robert (2026). Even Silence Has a Witness: The Whitewashing of Ethical Corruption at the International Criminal Court. Editorial Arcadia. ISBN 9798195593988.
