= Venezuelan Federation of Chambers of Commerce =

Main business union of Venezuela

Logotype

The Venezuelan Federation of Chambers of Commerce and Production (Spanish: Federación de Cámaras y Asociaciones de Comercio y Producción de Venezuela) or Fedecámaras is Venezuela's main business union. It is formed by businesses that represent all economic sectors of the country.

Fedecámaras is composed of chambers of commerce (cámara in Spanish) in fourteen basic trade groups: banking, agriculture, commerce, construction, energy, manufacturing, media, mining, ranching, insurance, transportation, tourism, real estate and telecommunications. Additionally, 18 regional Fedecámaras chapters complete the organisation. Fedecámaras represents small, medium and large-size companies.

In practice, the intended function of Fedecámaras is to act as an organization observing and guiding these sectors of the Venezuelan economy, setting wages and working conditions within each respective trade. Fedecámaras enforces these conditions by several means, including strikes against their aggregate employees to enforce wages and conditions. The cámaras also seek to informally control the amount of competition they will allow into each trade by controlling membership, and the rights enjoyed by members.

This organization was at political odds with former Venezuelan President Hugo Chávez. During a failed coup d'état against him in April 2002, former Fedecámaras president Pedro Carmona assumed the role of interim de facto president of Venezuela for two days.

== Background ==
Founded in 1944, Fedecámaras was formed with the main objective of protecting the free enterprise, by promoting the development and diversification of the country within a regulatory system that guarantees the rights of all individuals, and by defending its members and affiliates.

== President and leadership ==
The current leadership for the 2025-2027 period is the following: Felipe Capozzolo is the president; Tiziana Polesel is the first vice-president, Rafael Trejo is the second vice-president, and Celso Fantinel is the treasurer.

List of past presidents Fedecámaras:

Presidents of Fedecámaras
Name	Period
Luis Gonzalo Marturet	1945–1946
Domingo Navarro Méndez	1946–1947
Óscar Machado Zuloaga	1947–1949
Lope Mendoza G.	1949–1950
Silvio Gutiérrez	1950–1952
Luis Gonzalo Marturet	1952–1953
Ibrahim Velutini	1953–1954
Francisco Morillo R.	1954–1955
Feliciano Pacanins	1955–1956
Ángel Cervini	1957–1958
Alejandro Hernández	1958–1960
Rafael Echeverría	1960–1961
Armando Branger	1961–1963
Emilio Conde Jahn	1963–1965
Concepción Quijada	1965–1967
Alfredo Lafée	1967–1969
Óscar de Guruceaga	1969–1971
Carlos G. Rangel	1971–1973
Alfredo Paúl Delfino	1973–1975
Antonio Díaz Martínez	1975–1977
Carlos Vogeler Rincones	1977–1979
Ciro Añez Fonseca	1979–1981
Carlos Sequera Yépez	1981–1983
Adán Celis	1983–1985
Rafael Marcial Garmendia	1985–1987
Hugo Fonseca Viso	1987–1989
Eddo Polesel	1989–1991
Freddy Rojas Parra	1991–1993
Edgar Romero Nava	1993–1995
Jorge Serrano F.	1995–1997
Francisco Natera	1997–1999
Vicente Brito	1999–2001
Pedro Carmona Estanga	2001–2002
Carlos Fernández Pérez	2002–2003
Albis Muñoz	2003–2005
José Luis Betancourt	2005–2007
José Manuel González	2007–2009
Noel Álvarez	2009–2011
Jorge Botti	2011–2013
Jorge Roig	2013–2015
Francisco Martínez	2015–2017
Carlos Larrazábal	2017–2019
Ricardo Cusanno	2019–2021
Carlos Fernández Gallardo	2021–2023
Adán Celis Michelena	2023-present

== See also ==
- Venezuelan coup attempt of 2002
