= Cabinet of Juan Guaidó =

- Interim Cabinet of Venezuela

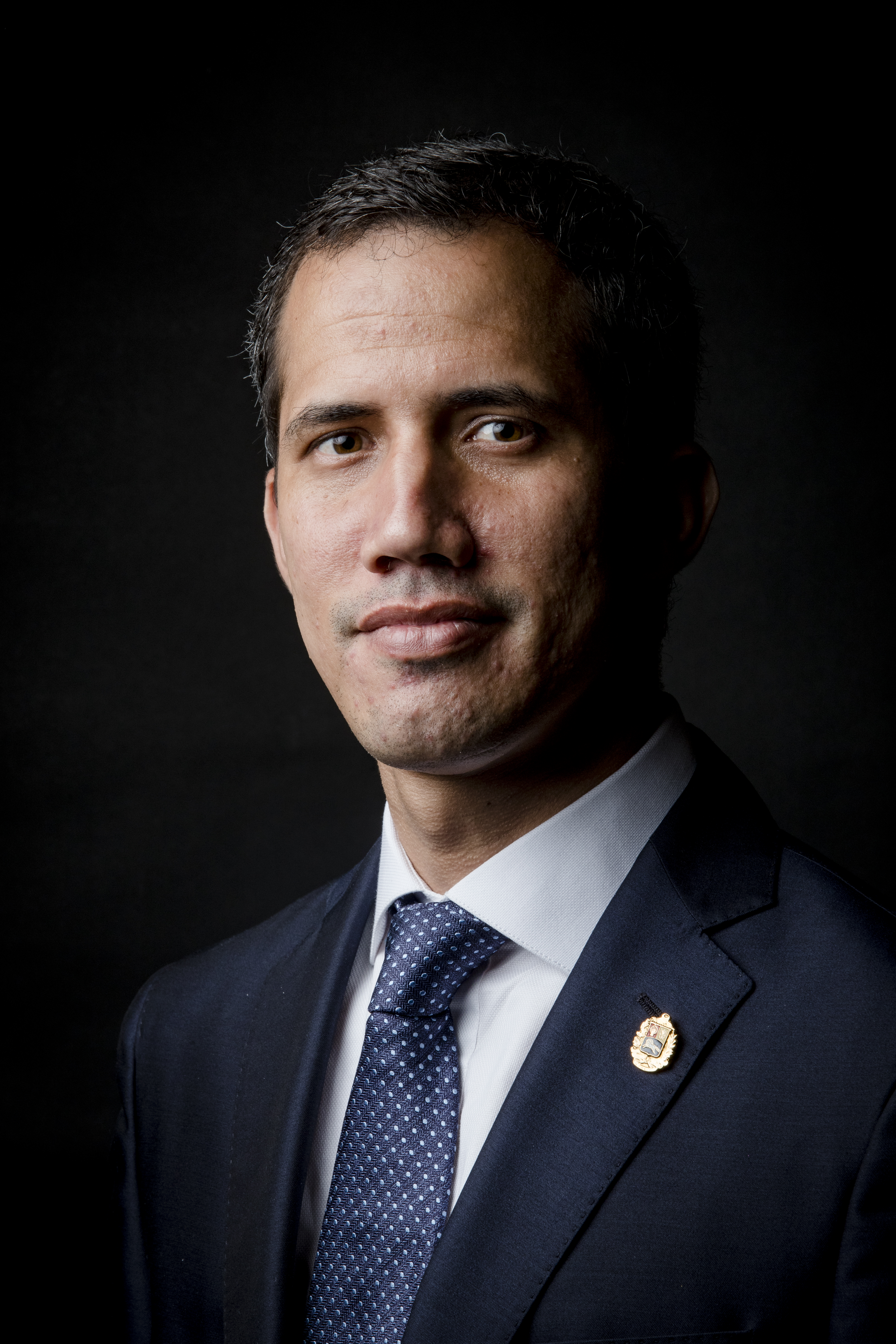
- Date formed: 23 January 2019
- Date dissolved: 5 January 2023

People and organisations
- Represented by: Interim government of Juan Guaidó
- Interim President: Juan Guaidó (Disputed)
- Interim President's history: List: President of the National Assembly (2019–23); Majority Leader of the National Assembly (2018–19); National Assembly Deputy (2016–21)
- Member parties: MUD
- Status in legislature: Majority (2019–2021) 112 / 167 (67%)
- Opposition cabinet: Second Cabinet of Nicolás Maduro
- Opposition party: GPPSB
- Opposition leader: Nicolás Maduro

History
- Legislature term: IV National Assembly

Following the disputed 2018 Venezuelan presidential election and the subsequent Venezuelan presidential crisis, opposition candidate Juan Guaidó proclaimed himself interim president on 23 January 2019. He then created an interim government by appointing an acting cabinet. The cabinet lasted until the dissolution of the interim government on 5 January 2023. Throughout that period it never wielded any domestic power.

== Cabinet members ==
Cabinet
Portfolio	Minister	Took office	Left office	Party	Ref
Interim President of the Republic	Juan Guaidó	23 January 2019	5 January 2023	Popular Will	
General Coordinator of the Center of Government	Leopoldo López	28 August 2019	5 January 2023	Popular Will	
Presidential Commissioner for Foreign Affairs	Julio Borges	28 August 2019	5 December 2021	PJ	
Presidential Commissioner for Human Rights and Victim Care	Humberto Prado	28 August 2019	5 January 2023	Independent	
Presidential Commissioner for Asset Recovery	Javier Troconis	28 August 2019	5 January 2023	Independent	
Presidential Commissioner for Economic Development	Alejandro Plaz	28 August 2019	5 January 2023	Independent	
Presidential Commissioner for the United Nations	Miguel Pizarro	22 September 2019	5 January 2023	PJ	
President of the Commission for the Recovery of Telesur	Leopoldo Castillo	14 January 2020	5 January 2023	Independent	
Special Commissioner for Security and Intelligence	Iván Simonovis	10 July 2019	17 May 2021	Independent	
Special Commissioner for the Fight Against Corruption	Carlos Paparoni	14 January 2020	5 January 2023	PJ	
Special Prosecutor	José Ignacio Hernández Gonzales	27 February 2019	18 June 2020	Independent	
Special Prosecutor	Enrique Sánchez Falcón	23 June 2020	5 January 2023	Independent	
Ambassador of Venezuela to the Organization of American States	Gustavo Tarre	22 January 2020	5 January 2023	Copei	
Director of Citizen Services of the National Assembly	Luis Somaza	2019	5 January 2023	Popular Will	
Ad hoc President of Citgo Petroleum Corp	Luisa Palacios	February 2019	7 January 2021	Independent	
Special Comptroller of the Republic	Juan Pablo Soteldo	12 February 2020	5 January 2023	Independent	
Ad hoc President of the Central Bank of Venezuela	Ricardo Villasmil Bond	February 2019	August 2020	Independent	
Ad hoc President of the Central Bank of Venezuela	Manuel Rodríguez Armesto	August 2020	5 January 2023	Independent	

== See also ==
- Cabinet of Venezuela
