= Carmona Decree =

Document drawn up after the 2002 Venezuelan coup attempt

The Act Constituting the Government of Democratic Transition and National Unity (Spanish: Acta de Constitución del Gobierno de Transición Democrática y Unidad Nacional), known colloquially as the "Carmona Decree" or El Carmonazo, was a document drawn up on 12 April 2002 the day following the 2002 Venezuelan coup attempt, which attempted to oust President Hugo Chávez. This Act established a transitional government, dissolving the National Assembly and the Supreme Court, and also suspending the Attorney General, Comptroller General, governors, and mayors elected during Chávez's administration.

== Clauses ==
Within the Act, the basis for the formation of a transitional government is delineated, citing the Constitution of Venezuela. The Act principally cites Article 350 of the Constitution, which says the People of Venezuela shall disown any regime, legislation or authority that violates democratic values, principles and guarantees or encroaches upon human rights. It also alleges violations by the Chávez administration of Articles 43, 57, 58, 68, 136, 141, 145, 204, 211, 254, 270, 273, 279, 294, 295, and 328 of the Constitution, and it references the Democratic Charter of the Organization of American States and Chávez's supposed resignation the day before. Remembering the date of 11 April 2002 "with profound indignation and national mourning", it accuses the government of Chávez of:

- Attacking, repressing, and assassinating innocent peaceful demonstrators.
- Compromising democratic principles, particularly representative democracy.
- Human and property rights violations.
- Flagrant violation of separation and independence of powers.
- Corruption.
- Misuse of the armed forces.
- Promoting a climate of social violence.
- Unacceptable isolationist foreign policy, aiding Colombian guerrillas.
- Eliminating autonomy of the electoral process.
- Enacting an enabling act without consulting the electorate.
- Promoting violence via its Bolivarian Circles.
- Disrespecting institutions necessary for peaceful democratic coexistence.

== Articles ==
The Act declares the formation of a democratic and national unity transition government according to the following articles:

- Article I Designated Pedro Carmona Estanga President of Venezuela in charge of the Executive Branch.
- Article II Re-established the country's name as República de Venezuela, eliminating the name "Bolivarian".
- Article III Suspended the National Assembly, with new elections to be held no later than December 2002.
- Article IV Created a 35-member advisory council to guide the interim president.
- Article V Named the President of Venezuela to coordinate the interim period.
- Article VI Established that Presidential elections would occur in no later than 365 days, and the interim President may not be a candidate.
- Article VII The President of Venezuela and Cabinet will select the interim public officials at the national, state and local level.
- Article VIII Reorganized public offices to recuperate autonomy and independence, removing officials illegitimately named to their posts as members of the Supreme Court, Attorney General, Comptroller General, and members of the National Electoral Council. These positions would be filled as soon as possible with consultation of the Ministers and Advisory Council.
- Article IX Suspended 49 decrees from the Ley Habilitante (Enabling Act).
- Article X Upheld all other laws both internal and international, as long as they do not disagree with the present Act.
- Article XI All members of the transitional government will abandon their posts once their newly elected counterparts take charge.

== Aftermath ==
The Act was the catalyst that allowed the Armed Forces to justify abandoning the newly formed government, returning Chávez to power on 13 April. After Chávez was re-instated as president, controversy regarding those that signed the Act remained. According to El Nacional, among almost 400 signatures is the signature of María Corina Machado, a political activist and co-founder of Súmate. She denies signing the decree itself, but rather a signature roll. Another notable signee is former Zulia Governor and former presidential candidate, Manuel Rosales, who says his participation was an honest mistake rather than a pre-planned coup like Chávez's. Referring to the Act, Venezuelan historian and politician Jorge Olavarría said "what these fellows brought, and may people who hear pardon me but these things have to be said with the crudeness of the situation, what these fellows brought me [the Carmona decree draft] is a piece of shit, yes totally, if this is going to happen, you have to do these things well, but this was a big mess up, technically and politically..."
