= Pedro Carmona =

Venezuelan economist (born 1941)

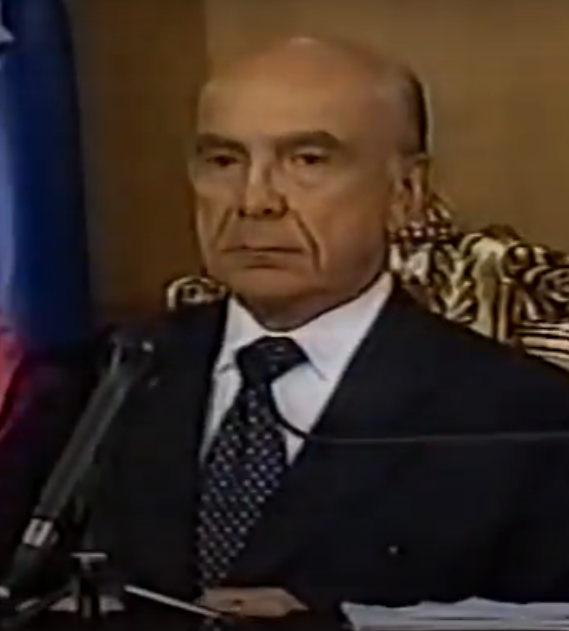
- Carmona in 2002

Acting President of Venezuela
- In office 12 April 2002 – 13 April 2002
- Vice President: Diosdado Cabello
- Preceded by: Hugo Chávez
- Succeeded by: Diosdado Cabello (acting)

President of Fedecámaras
- In office 28 July 2001 – 11 April 2002
- Preceded by: Vicente Brito
- Succeeded by: Carlos Fernández Pérez

Personal details
- Born: Pedro Francisco Carmona Estanga; 6 July 1941 (age 85) Barquisimeto, Lara, Venezuela
- Citizenship: Colombia
- Education: Universidad Católica Andrés Bello
- Profession: Business
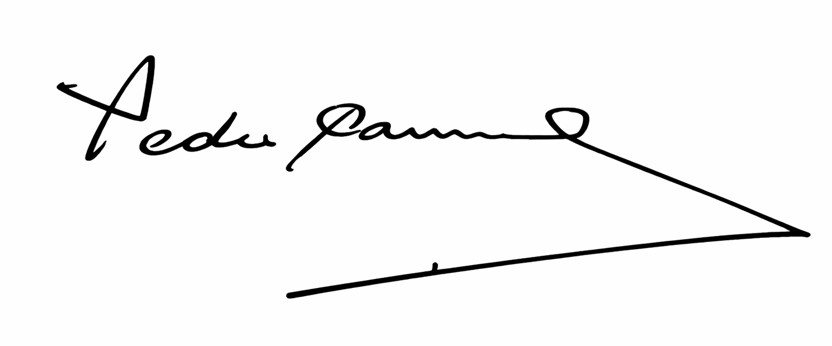
- Signature

Pedro Francisco Carmona Estanga (born 6 July 1941) is a Venezuelan politician, economist, and businessman. He was president of the business federation Fedecámaras and served as de facto President of Venezuela for 47 hours following the 2002 coup attempt. According to the news portal La Patilla, Pedro Carmona arrived at Simón Bolívar International Airport in Maiquetía on November 16, coming from Madrid, Spain.

== Early life ==
Carmona was born in Barquisimeto, Lara State, on 6 July 1941. He graduated in 1964 from the Andrés Bello Catholic University in Economics and did postgraduate studies at the Free University of Brussels.

He was elected president of Fedecámaras in July 2001 for the 2001-2003 term. Previously, he had held various public and private positions, notably as a director of private petrochemical companies, including Aditivos Orinoco (1989-1993), Química Venoco (1989-2000), Industrias Venoco (1990-2000), and Promotora Venoco (2001).

He served on the board of directors of the renowned Institute of Advanced Studies in Business Administration (IESA), the Andean Development Corporation (CAF), the Foreign Trade Institute (ICE), and the Latin American and Caribbean Economic System (SELA). He wrote opinion pieces for the Caracas newspaper El Universal, clearly expressing his anti-Chávez stance. He received important Latin American decorations: the Order of the Sun of Peru, the National Order of Merit of Colombia, and the Bernardo O'Higgins Order of Chile.

== 2002 Coup attempt and Presidency ==
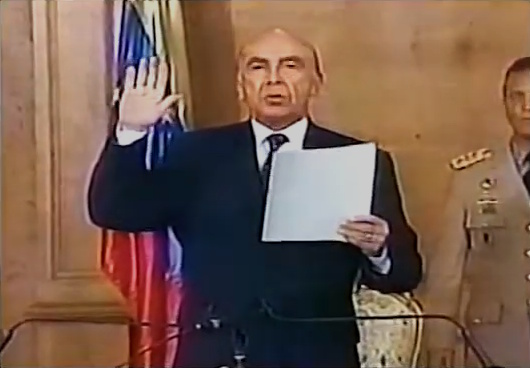
Carmona being sworn in as president of Venezuela during the coup attempt.

The early part of 2002 saw mass protests and a general strike by opponents of Hugo Chávez. On 11 April 2002, following clashes between both supporters and opponents of Chávez, Lucas Rincón, commander-in-chief of the Venezuelan Armed Forces, announced in a nationwide broadcast that Chávez had tendered his resignation from the presidency. While Chávez was brought to a military base and held there, military leaders appointed Carmona as the transitional President of Venezuela.

In the face of crowds of Chávez supporters taking to the streets and under pressure from some quarters of the military, Chávez was restored to office. During Carmona's 36-hour government, military officers held Chávez and attempted to force his exile. Additionally, security forces conducted raids without warrants and took some Chávez supporters into custody illegally, including National Assembly deputy Tarek William Saab, a member of the Chávez-aligned MVR, who was taken into protective custody by security forces after a large crowd had gathered around his home, threatening him and his family. He was held incommunicado for several hours.

After the coup, Carmona was arrested by the military police and taken to Fort Tiuna, then placed under house arrest, from which he escaped, taking refuge in the Colombian embassy, which later granted him asylum. Carmona's subsequent stay in Colombia under asylum has contributed to maintaining a certain degree of tension between the two countries. The issue is mentioned more in Venezuelan domestic politics and in the media of both countries than in official diplomatic circles.

== See also ==
- Carmona Decree
- List of people granted asylum
- List of presidents of Venezuela
