= Media hegemony =

Media hegemony is a perceived process by which certain values and ways of thought promulgated through the mass media become dominant in society. It is seen in particular as reinforcing the capitalist system. Media hegemony has been presented as influencing the way in which reporters in the media – themselves subject to prevailing values and norms – select news stories and put them across.

== A form of hegemony ==
The concept of hegemony, first put forward by Antonio Gramsci, refers to the moral, philosophical, and political leadership of a social group, which is not gained by force but by an active consent of other social groups obtained by taking control of culture and ideology. During this process, the leading social group exerts its impact and gains its legitimacy mainly through social mechanisms such as education, religion, family and the mass media. Based on the definition of hegemony, media hegemony means the dominance of certain aspects of life and thought by the penetration of a dominant culture and its values into social life. In other words, media hegemony serves as a crucial shaper of culture, values and ideology of society (Altheide, 1984).

For example, television news departments are considered as extensions of a capitalistic economic order (Hall, 1979). The products of the media contain messages that convey the nature of society, the nature of relation of production within the media and the domain of institutions and social process (Golding, 1979). Thus it is crucial to decode media to figure out the latent capitalist ideology within the products of the media, and more importantly to realize the role of the media as tools to produce merchandise in a late capitalist economic order.

Altheide (1984) has cautioned against the "uncritical" application of the media hegemony paradigm to television news coverage.

== Results of media hegemony ==
Media hegemony is said to operate in several ways within news reporting. Firstly, the socialization of reporters including guidance, work norms and orientations will be greatly influenced by the dominant ideology (Mueller, 1973). Socialization of journalists means that they are socialized into professional and organizational norms (Gieber, 1960). And some basic values and norms they share are influenced by ideology, as it is hard to be independent from the culture that the dominant class shapes (Gans, 1979). Though journalists claim that they are autonomic from the state and marketing forces and that they are always on the side of the public as social instrument, it is undeniable that the ideology and control of economic interests permeate the assumption, orientations and procedure of reporters who are the direct producers of news stories. Journalists can unconsciously facilitate the ideological hegemony by the way they use cultural categories and symbols (Chaney, 1981).

Further, reporters are inclined to choose and report those issues that are favorable to the dominant ideology and the status quo. This selection process hinders social change by diffusing conservative news reports to the public (Golding, 1981). To a large extent, the formation of public opinion is based on the information spread by status quo-oriented news media.

Finally, reporters tend to report those news stories that are supportive of their nation and negative to foreign nations in globalized communication. It is believed that prejudiced news reporting will hinder international social change (Artz, 2012). News media may shape negative stereotypes of foreign countries. Values and ideology are disseminated through international social communication to exert an impact on people in foreign nations.
