= Venezuela Information Office =

Venezuela Information Office (VIO)
- Formation: July 2003
- Type: Lobbying
- Headquarters: Washington, D.C.
- Owner: Government of Venezuela
- Executive Director: Olivia Goumbri
- Key people: Deborah James (former Executive Director)
- Parent organization: Embassy of Venezuela, Washington, D.C.
- Budget: +$1 million (2007)

The Venezuela Information Office (VIO) was a Washington, D.C.–based lobbying agency that stated to be seeking to "present a more accurate view of the current process in Venezuela for the US public, build strategic allies for the Venezuelan people, and prevent the US from intervening in the democratic process in Venezuela." Created and financed by the government of Venezuela, VIO was registered with the United States Department of Justice under the Foreign Agents Registration Act. While operational, conservative and pro-opposition outlets have defined the agency of being a propaganda organization of the Venezuelan government and the Bolivarian Revolution.

== History ==
Hugo Chávez set up the VIO in 2003 in order to combat criticism from the United States. In September 2003, VIO contacted Global Exchange in order to "ensure success" of their campaign while also discussing "ideas for strategizing on Venezuela" and "to begin conference calls of solidarity groups". In February 2004, it closed and then suddenly reopened a month later with new staff and a budget of $660,000. In 2005, the VIO received about $800,000 for the year. By 2007, the funding received by the VIO had risen to over $1,000,000. The VIO's "rethinkvenezuela.com" website has not been active since 2009.

== Work ==
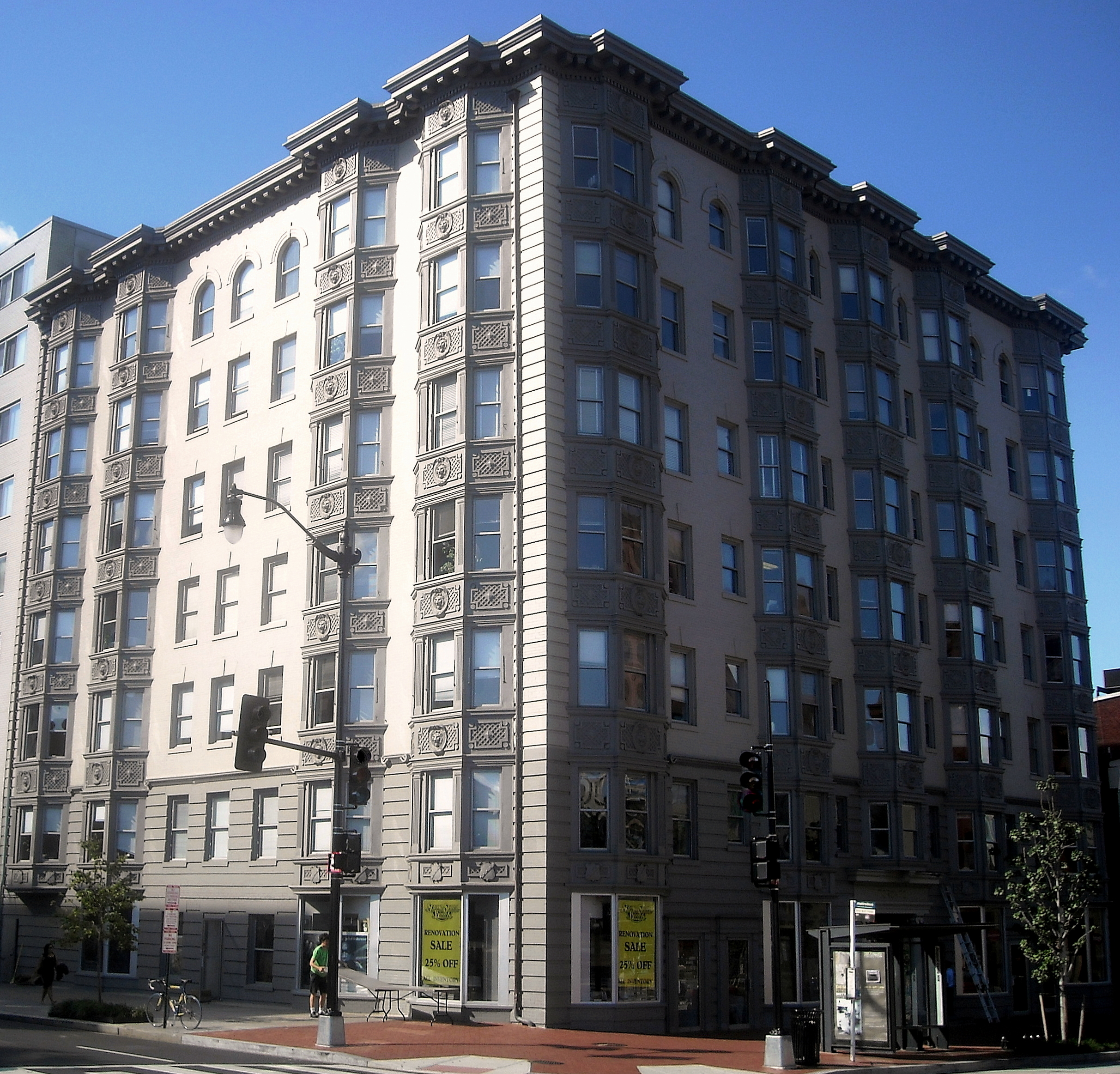
The Venezuela Information Office (VIO) was located in The Toronto (pictured) in Washington, D.C.

According to the VIO, the agency sought "to present a more accurate view of the current process in Venezuela for the US public, build strategic allies for the Venezuelan people, and prevent the US government from intervening in the democratic process in Venezuela," using Congressional advocacy and grassroots public education and action. In 2007, the VIO only contacted 8 offices of the United States Congress, though it had contacted hundreds of journalists, local officials, academics and students.

=== Media ===
In addition to maintaining a public website and a blog, VIO promoted its views in the media in a number of ways, including issuing press releases, contributing articles (such as responses to the 2008 Human Rights Watch report on Venezuela), and being available for interviews. The VIO had also run a campaign of ads in the United States.

The VIO also created a "rapid response" group that would counter articles critical of Hugo Chávez. They would refute claims using e-mails, sending letters to the editor, writing articles, and using video documentaries such as The Revolution Will Not Be Televised. Journalist received emails "suggesting ideas for balanced reporting" and asked activists to "complain against alleged newspaper biases". The VIO targeted newspapers that had alleged "biases" which included The Washington Post, The Miami Herald, The Denver Post and other organizations. At protests, conventions and on college campuses, the VIO distributed books and played The Revolution Will Not Be Televised. They had also emailed multiple independent theaters to play The Revolution Will Not Be Televised year-round.

=== Lobbying ===
In 2004, the VIO contracted public relations company Lumina Strategies, headed by former Global Exchange employee Michael Shellenberger, to help lobby for the Venezuelan government and improve the poor image of then President of Venezuela, Hugo Chávez, in the United States. Reporters that had questions for the VIO were directed to Lumina. According to public records the VIO spent $379,000 on lobbying the US Congress in the years 2004 to 2007.

=== Visits ===
The VIO helped organize trips to Venezuela for their activists in January 2004.

== Personnel ==
In 2004, Deborah James, was the executive director of the VIO. In 2007, the staff was paid between $30,000 to $60,000 annually.

The VIO was also incorporated in the state of Florida under VIO Investments Corp., owned by Isaura and Evelio Gilmond. Isaura Gilmond performed administrative and accounting services for the VIO.

== Reception ==
Douglas Schoen and Michael Rowan along with conservative journals have portrayed the VIO as one of Hugo Chávez's "modern propaganda techniques" and a part of a "propaganda operation in the United States".

According to The New York Times, VIO activists would not only "spiff up Venezuela's image" but also "doggedly unearth damaging evidence of Bush administration ties to opposition groups". In a 2005 article, El Universal characterized the agency as using "alleged journalists and political analysts to disseminate positive information on the [Bolivarian] revolution in the US media and among politicians" while working to deny alleged "lies" that were supposedly published by the international and Venezuelan media.

== See also ==
- Bolivarian propaganda
- United States–Venezuela relations
