= Bolivarian propaganda =

Pro-Chávez Venezuelan propaganda

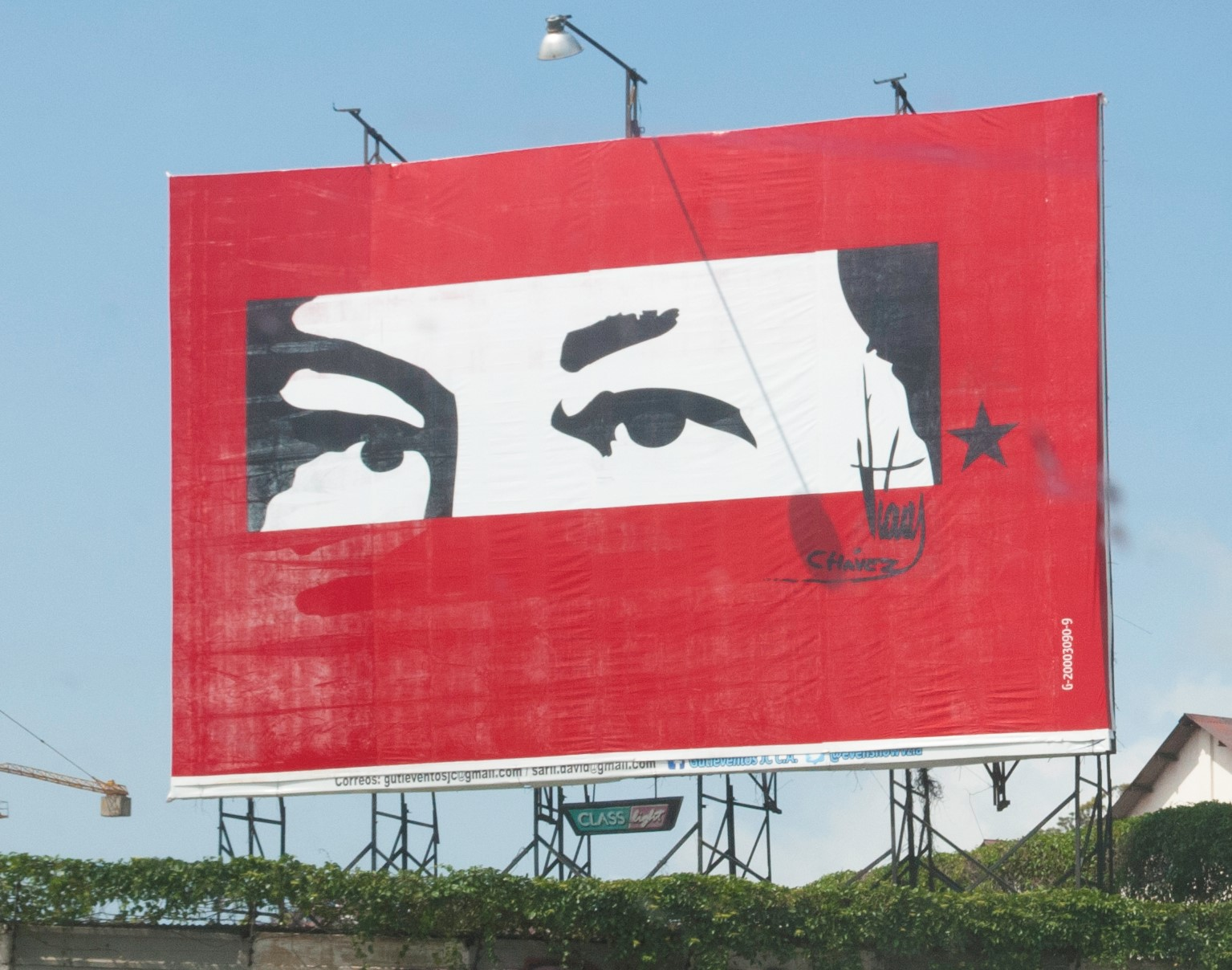
A billboard of Hugo Chávez's eyes and signature in Guarenas, Venezuela

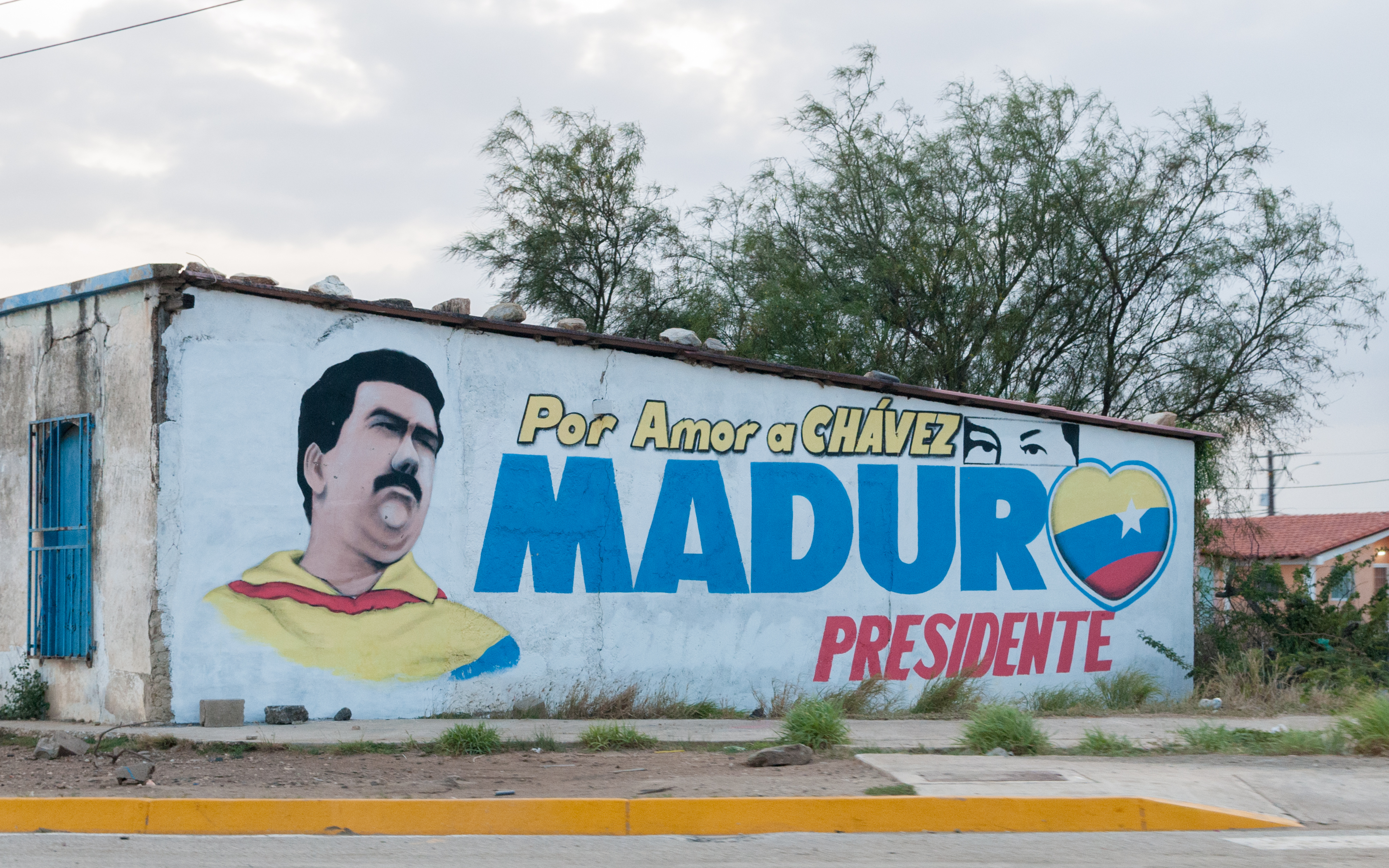
A political painting saying, "For the love of Chávez. Maduro (for) President." with the popular "Chávez eyes" visible.

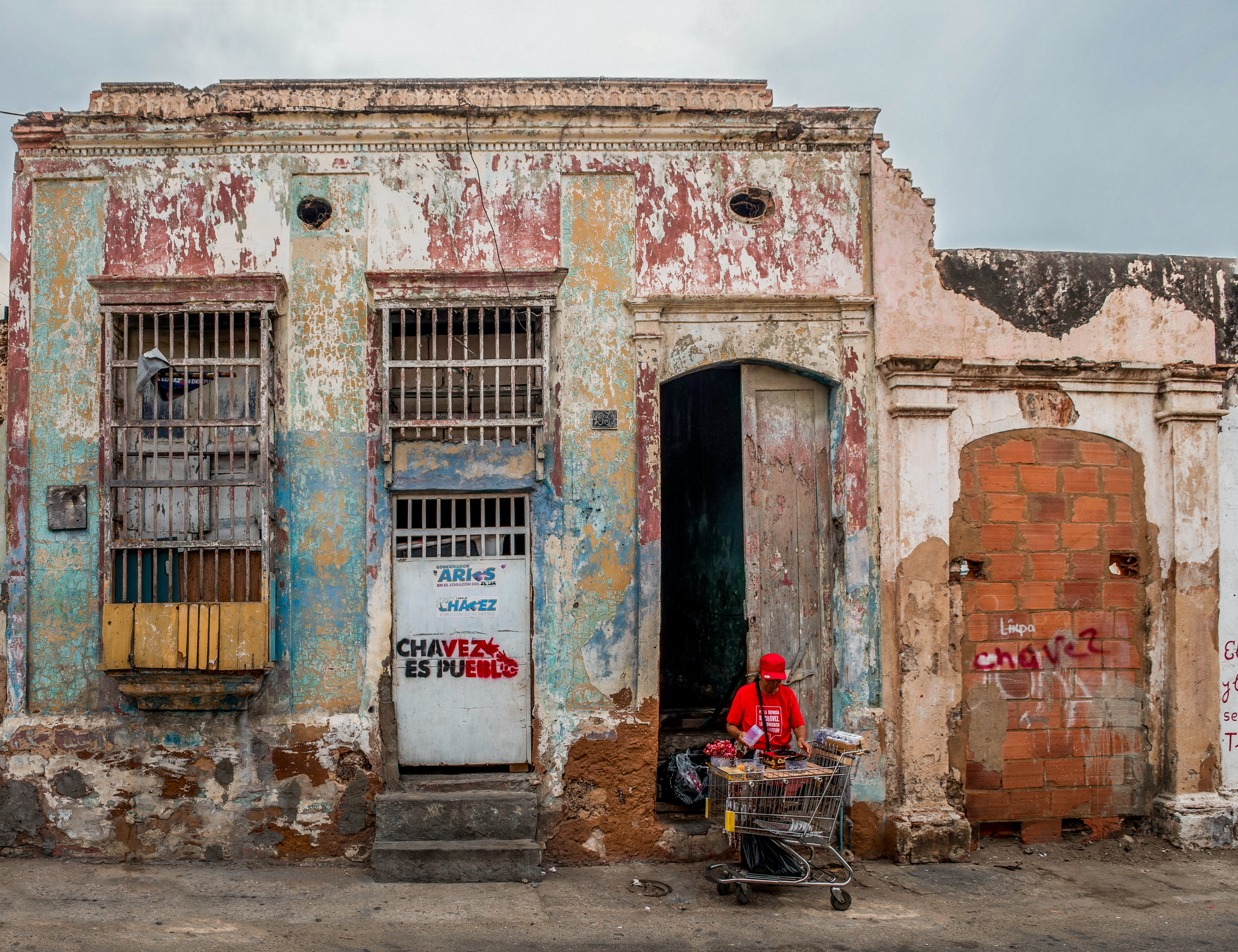
House painted with propaganda and woman in clothing supporting Hugo Chávez in Maracaibo, Venezuela.

Bolivarian propaganda (also known as chavista propaganda and Venezuelan propaganda) is a form of nationalist propaganda, especially in Venezuela and associated with chavismo, Venezuelan socialism. This type of propaganda has been associated with Hugo Chávez's Bolivarian Revolution, which used emotional arguments to gain attention, exploit the fears of the population, create external enemies for scapegoat purposes, and produce nationalism within the population, causing feelings of betrayal for support of the opposition.

The World Politics Review stated in 2007 that, as Chávez began "transforming Venezuela into a socialist state", propaganda was "an important role in maintaining and mobilizing government supporters". The image of Chávez was seen on sides of buildings, on T-shirts, on ambulances, on official Petróleos de Venezuela (PDVSA) billboards, and as action figures throughout Venezuela. A 2011 article by The New York Times said Venezuela has an "expanding state propaganda complex" while The Boston Globe described Chávez as "a media savvy, forward-thinking propagandist" that had "the oil wealth to influence public opinion".

Chávez's successor, Nicolás Maduro, has continued using obligatory broadcasts on television known as cadenas. Maduro became unpopular among Venezuelans, especially throughout the Venezuelan protests, with The Economist noting that "Chavistas used to be good at propaganda. Now they cannot even get that right". Essayist Alberto Barrera Tyszka has stated that citizens viewing state propaganda see well-fed Bolivarian officials living in "decadence", which offends the "poverty of Venezuelans" and has damaged the government's image, with the majority of Venezuelans suffering from malnutrition under Maduro's government.

== Background ==
The term Bolivarian Revolution denotes a system of government, based on Simón Bolívar's vision of a unified South America led by a "strong but compassionate caudillo". Months after being inaugurated in 1999, Chávez promised to bring dramatic change to Venezuela through this revolution resulting in a "radical redefinition of the relationship of the media system of mass communication with the sphere of political power and beyond, with the State itself as controller and regulating agent of society".

A so-called "participatory democracy", had become the foundation of the Hugo Chávez administration, with Chávez utilizing the national hero Simón Bolívar to legitimize his political standing. According to Rory Carroll, "Media mastery had helped the commandante win successive elections and turn his administration into what he called the Bolivarian revolution".

Chávez's popularity was accomplished through "exploitation of charismatic legitimacy" and a propaganda program was established to accomplish "participatory democracy", to strengthen his political position, and to strengthen his power base. Douglas Schoen in The Threat Closer to Home said that Chávez has promoted his populist message via programs and legislation including a loyal chavista branch of bishops in the Catholic Church, closing RCTV, and altering laws to require citizens to report disloyal citizens.

== Funding ==
In 2002, the Venezuelan government signed a $1.2 million contract with lobby firm Patton Boggs to improve the image of Hugo Chávez in the United States. In 2004, it was estimated that the Venezuelan government's funding of propaganda was $30,000 per day domestically to about $1.0 million per day for both domestic and international propaganda.

According to El Nacional, 65% of Venezuela's Ministry of Communication and Information (MINCI) funds were used for "official propaganda" in 2014. Allocation of funds to MINCI were over 500 million Venezuelan bolívares. These funds were divided among separate government media organizations; 161,043,447 bolívares to VTV, 65% more than it received in 2012, 97,335,051 bolívares for the Venezuelan Telecommunications Corporation, 96,861,858 bolívares for the New Television Station of the South, 20,381,890 bolívares for El Correo del Orinoco, 48,935,326 bolívares for AVN and more.

For the 2015 Venezuelan government budget, the Venezuelan government designated 1.8 billion bolívares for the promotion of the supposed achievements made by the government of Nicolás Maduro, which was more than the 1.3 billion bolívares designated by the Ministry of Interior, Justice and Peace for public safety of the most populous Venezuelan municipality, Libertador Bolivarian Municipality. Funding for domestic propaganda increased 139.3% in the 2015 budget with 73.7% of the Ministry of Communication and Information's budget compromising for official propaganda. With the 2015 budget, payments for government media could be around 3.61 billion bolívares per year.

== Governmental and political organizations ==
=== Ministry of Popular Power for Communication and Information ===
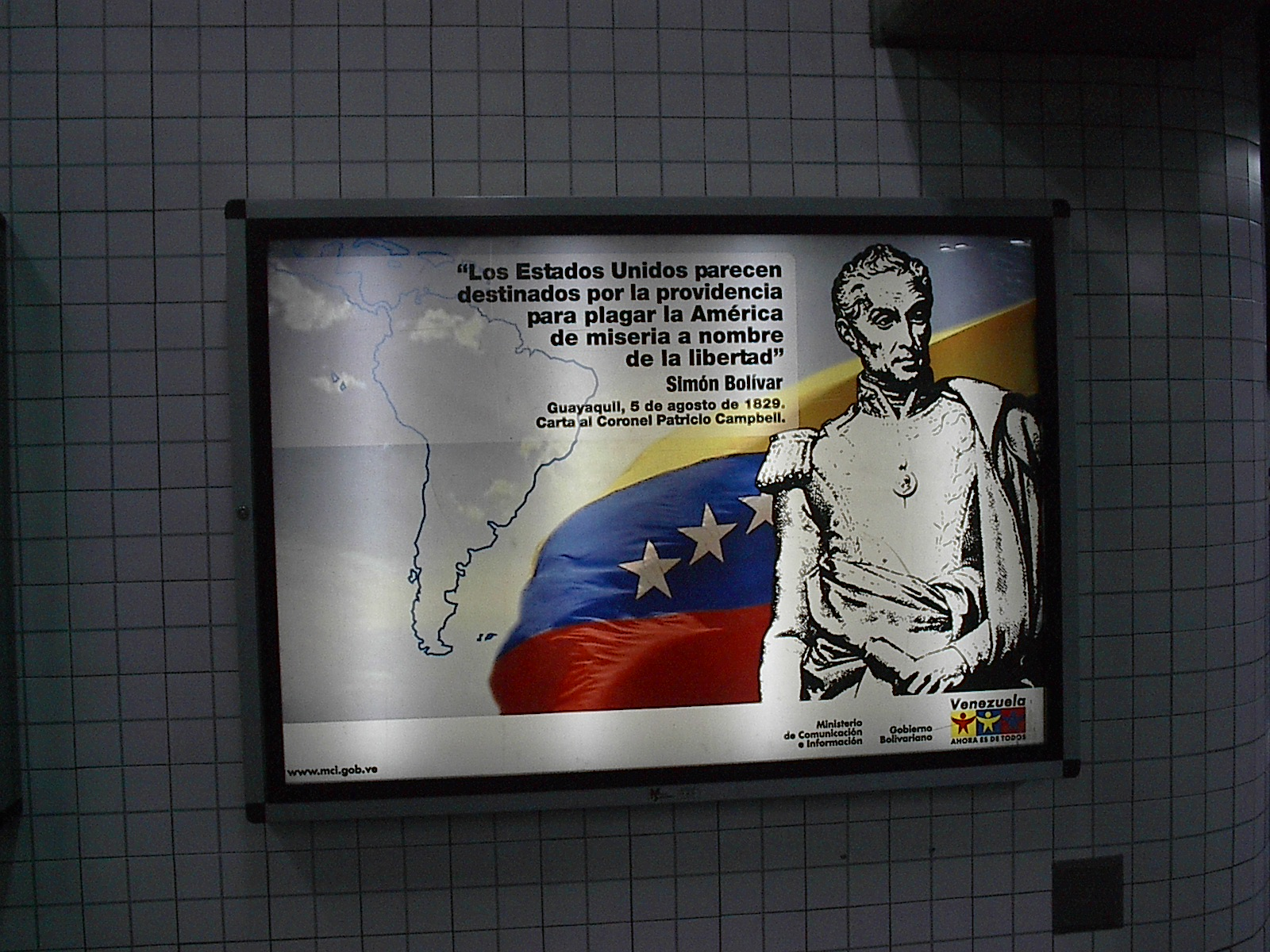
Ministry of Popular Power for Communication and Information board quoting Simon Bolivar, reading: "The United States appears by providence to plague America with misery in the name of freedom."

According to El Nacional, the Venezuelan government's Ministry of Popular Power for Communication and Information (MINCI) used the majority of their 2014 budget for "official propaganda". According to a political communication analyst, Oswaldo Ramírez, MINCI has been "the propaganda function" during the Maduro presidency due to his low popularity. The vice president of the National Association of Journalists (CNP), Nikary González, stated that MINCI "remains with political propaganda that favors the PSUV".

=== United Socialist Party of Venezuela (PSUV) ===
The United Socialist Party of Venezuela (PSUV) is the ruling political party of the Venezuelan government which was created from the fusion of pro-Bolivarian Revolution and pro-Chávez parties. The PSUV has used propaganda to influence support for the Bolivarian Revolution. According to the University of La Sabana, "since coming to power, the government of the Fifth Republic Movement (MVR), what is today the United Socialist Party of Venezuela (PSUV), devoted the bulk of its energies to achieving three basic objectives with respect to communications, ... the erection of a single regulatory framework to govern all audiovisual and electronic media; the expansion of alternative-community media, as well as public, preceded by a strong economic investment in order to optimize the operation of these media devices through training, provision of equipment and infrastructure improvement, and the creation of independent bodies that centralize content control, access to grants and frequencies and management of training courses, among other issues".

=== The Commission of Propaganda, Agitation and Communication of the PSUV ===
On 27 August 2014, the first meeting of The Commission of Propaganda, Agitation and Communication of the PSUV was held. Head of the committee, Ernesto Villegas, stated that the committee recognized would continue communicating like "Commander Hugo Chávez, the great communicator, agitator and propagandist to remain so for indeed still with us and will remain, his message, his political doctrine which is the guide and permanent blaze that pushes us to move forward together to conquer this people building the Bolivarian Socialism". Villegas further explained that "the commission planned communication strategies that will be based on the policy guidelines issued by the PSUV". According to the PSUV, "members of the committee will hold regular and special meetings, in order to develop plans and carry out actions to defend the truth and block the war waged against the Bolivarian Revolution".

The National Commission of Propaganda, Agitation and Communication encourages people on the street to use their work and place propaganda in public spaces in order to counter "capitalist relations of exploitation and domination". Their website includes stencils for Venezuelans to spray paint propaganda graffiti. Ernesto Villegas said that, "We will go to each brigade, paintings and some elements for propaganda. For that we will we deploy on the street and has murals and presence of the voice of the Bolivarian Revolution telling the truth, carrying the memory, enthusiasm and optimism, additional information is necessary".

== Media ==
Bolivarian propaganda has been disseminated in Venezuela and the abroad. The Bolivarian Revolution is advertised through all outlets: TV, radio, Internet (with websites like the Venezuelan Solidarity Campaign), magazines (like Viva Venezuela), newspapers, murals, billboards, memorabilia (action figures, T-shirts, posters), schools (through the lesson plans and books), movies, symphonies (Orquesta Sinfónica Simón Bolívar), festivals, and public service vehicles (like buses and ambulances). In Venezuela, "Hugo Chávez is everywhere", along with images portraying similarities to Simón Bolívar; the typical images that accompany the pro-socialist messages are the red star, Che Guevara portraits, Simón Bolívar portraits, red barrettes, Venezuelan flags, "evil" Uncle Sam, Uncle Sam as a snake, and Chávez with the superman logo. Opposition candidate María Corina Machado "complained about what she called a government-orchestrated propaganda machine that churns out spots ridiculing Chávez's critics, runs talk shows dominated by ruling party hopefuls and picks up all of the president's speeches".

In 2007, the Ministry of Popular Power for Communication and Information stated:

For the new strategic landscape that arises, the fight that falls in the ideological field has to do with a battle of ideas for the hearts and minds of people. We need to develop a new plan, and we are proposing is to the communicational and informational hegemony of the State ... Our socialism needs communicational hegemony ... all communications have to rely on the state as a public good.

Following this plan, the Venezuelan government shut down and limited private opposing media organizations, while expanding public propagandistic outlets, though it initially permitted Globovision in order to state that there was media plurality in the country. The Venezuelan government harassed Globovision with fines and rhetoric until its majority owner fled the country, closed dozens of radio stations and warned all media organizations into fear that if they criticized the government they could be shut down. By 2023, according to El País, Chavez's "communication hegemony" had been achieved with viewers without cable access limited to "high doses of chavista propaganda".

Writing in the 2020 The Sage Handbook of Propaganda, Daniel Aguirre and Caroline Ávila state that the "emergence of new media outlets that amplify the propaganda messaging that Chávez directly articulated and was later channeled by pro-government media" is covered in reports of the limitations of press freedom in Venezuela under chavismo; the authors mention Telesur, TVes, the "Aló Presidente" television show, cadenas overtaking air time, and a "combination of presidential actions, legislature and media harassment" such as the case of RCTV, under the Chavez and Maduro administrations that resulted in "populist communication" that was "biased and consequently akin to systemic propaganda".

=== Television and radio ===
Through the use of propaganda, Chávez continually verbalized his successes on television which resulted in a large popular base of support. Under Chávez, the number of state television channels grew from one to eight, with each channel constantly showing Chávez. What Chávez said "became de facto law" and since he was unpredictable and a great performer, suspense was built around his appearance on television.

Under Maduro, the government's "main weapon ... remains, state control of television, which repeats endlessly the risible claim that Venezuela is a victim of an economic war". However, unlike Chávez, Maduro lacks the same charisma that drew positive attention from the masses.

==== Cadenas ====
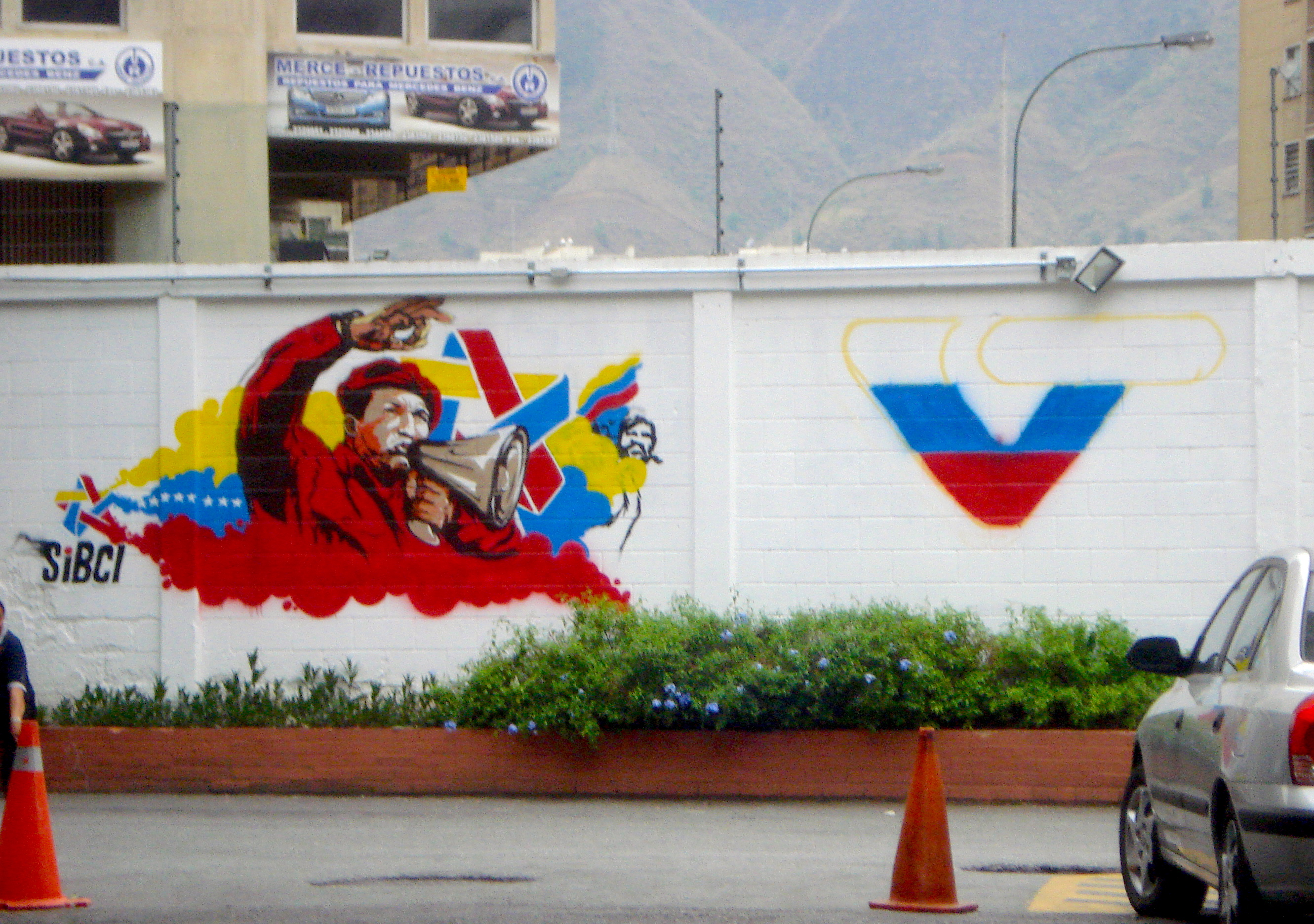
A mural representing SiBCI sharing Chávez's message beside the VTV logo

The executive office in Venezuela was granted permission to interrupt television broadcasting in Venezuela with cadenas, or obligatory televised transmissions. Chávez's predecessors would only use the broadcasts for emergencies or important events. Hugo Chávez, however, used cadenas every few days, often taking over regular programming for hours and using the broadcasts as an effective weapon to fight criticism by running continuously to all audiences both in urban and rural sections of Venezuela. The cadenas that would interrupt television programs had various topics ranging from visits from Russian delegations to tours of tractor factories, with the program lasting until Chávez wanted to stop speaking. By 2010, Chávez had spent 1,300 hours, or 53 days, speaking on them with a total of 1,923 cadenas lasting an average of 40 minutes.

During the presidency of Nicolás Maduro, the Organization of American States' Inter-American Commission on Human Rights stated that President Maduro "has continued to use obligatory national radio and television broadcasts to transmit government messages" and criticized President Maduro saying that “not just any information justifies the interruption by the President of the Republic of regularly scheduled programming. Rather, it must be information that could be of interest to the masses by informing them of facts that could be of public significance and that are truly necessary for real citizen participation in public life”. On 10 September 2013, President Maduro announced the creation of Noticiero de la Verdad, "an obligatory national broadcast, in order to provide information on the activities of his administration, as he believes that private media outlets do not report on official acts and conceal his administration's achievements". Between April 2013 and January 2016, President Maduro spent over 500 hours speaking on cadenas, with the broadcasts costing 255,000 Bs.F per minute.

==== Aló Presidente ====
In 2001, he transformed Aló Presidente from a radio show to a full-fledged live, unscripted, television show promoting the Bolivarian Revolution, blaming the Venezuelan economic problems on its northern neighbor, the United States as a "mass-market soapbox for the policies and musings" of Chávez, who The Boston Globe called "a media savvy, forward-thinking propagandist [who] has the oil wealth to influence public opinion". Many Venezuelan's tuned in because he would "reward his supporters with gifts and patronage, deciding, if not matters of life and death, then at least the destinies of individual citizens". From 1999 to 2009, President Chávez spent an average of 40 hours a week on television, spending over 1,500 between 2000 and 2010 denouncing capitalism on the show.

The production of Aló Presidente was well-polished in order to create the narrative that Chávez wanted to instill into viewers. In a 2015 case study by The London School of Economics and Political Science focused of Hugo Chávez's populism rhetoric in Aló Presidente, with personalism in his speeches remaining common throughout his presidency while polarising and "revolutionary" language increased. Chávez would use the program to show Venezuelans that those who supported him were rewarded while those who did not were used as scapegoats.

In 2015, Foreign Policy gave a description of Aló Presidente saying:

A mix of Jay Leno and Mussolini, the show allowed Chávez to share his views on anything from baseball to George W. Bush; to answer phone calls from the populace; to share personal anecdotes, fire ministers, announce the start of wars, or burst into song. International celebrities such as Naomi Campbell, Danny Glover, and Sean Penn would appear on the show, lending their star power to the Chávez brand of permanent socialist revolution.

==== TeleSUR ====
[Izarra] installed himself in Telesur and took the reins ... For him it wasn't about promoting Latin American identity and doing something different with television, but serving Chávez's domestic agenda and being a political instrument. That meant propaganda as rolling news. The same garbage as the enemy but from the other side. Bye-bye, credibility, they killed it. Izarra didn't debate. He kicked me out in December 2008.

— Aram Aharonian, teleSUR founder

In 2005 after teleSUR was founded, it was described as being a network showing the diversity of Latin America. After 2007 however, some began to believe that teleSUR appeared to be a propaganda tool for Hugo Chávez and his Bolivarian Revolution, with the network being described as "a mouthpiece for Chávez after Andres Izarra became head of the network. The Boston Globe stated that Chávez's government was able to fund 70% of TeleSUR's functions while also providing broadcasting facilities, with other leftist governments supporting the network as well, advertising it "as a Latin socialist answer to CNN". Joel D. Hirst, a former International Affairs Fellow in Residence of the Council on Foreign Relations, stated that the Bolivarian Alliance for the Peoples of Our America (ALBA), knowing the importance of propaganda, "embarked upon an ambitious plan to control information across the hemisphere" and began their plan with the creation of teleSUR in 2005. TeleSUR changed from a "modest attempt to pluralize media" to an organization that tries "to promote the charismatic presence of Hugo Chávez as an international figure".

The Legatum Institute states that TeleSUR "attempts to whitewash regime abuses and failures" and that "TeleSUR focuses on exaggerated coverage of negative events elsewhere ... and sets up false comparisons, such as equating Venezuelan supermarket queues and queues for the 'Black Friday' shopping holiday in the US".

==== Venezolana de Televisión ====
In February 2004, the president of state television station Venezolana de Television (VTV) stated that VTV was not a state television station but a station of President Chávez's political party. VTV would have ads showing the September 11 attacks, comparing them to the opposition stating "The people know who the terrorists are". During the Venezuelan general strike of 2002–03, VTV would share ads depicting Venezuelans waiting in line for gas canisters with a voice saying "The opposition unleashed terrorism on the Venezuelan people and it led to hunger and unemployment. Thanks to the new PDVSA, PDVSA is for all of us, all of us are PDVSA". VTV would also alter images of pro-government rallies to make them appear larger and used outdated videos to attack opposition members or former supporters.

=== Internet ===
The Internet can't be just for the bourgeoisie; it's for the ideological battle as well ...

— Hugo Chávez

In a chapter titled Hugo Chávez Would Like to Welcome You to the Spinternet in the book The Net Delusion: The Dark Side of Internet Freedom, Morozov explains how the Internet was originally supposed to make individuals "less susceptible to propaganda from politicians" according to one scholar in 1997, though Chávez and others proved that the prediction was wrong. Hugo Chávez's government then "hired contingents of government-funded but technically independent online commentators" to help spread and defend his message.

==== Social media ====
President Chávez, similar to other authoritarian regimes, was initially opposed to Twitter calling it a site "for spoiled brats to criticize him". According to Morozov, when the censorship of the Internet becomes "impractical, politically indefensible, or prohibitively expensive, governments begin to experiment with propaganda". As the use of Twitter by his opposition increased and since Chávez could not easily censor Twitter, he chose to become a user in order to place his own ideology on the social media website. In April 2010, President Chávez created a Twitter account and had 500,000 followers within a month, adding it as "part of the presidential choreography". Chávez's popularity on Twitter was not only attributed to his charisma, but to also his use of his government's resources, with Chávez announcing in a televised address that he would use hundreds of publicly funded staffers to "help him win the Twitter war". Hundreds of state workers then helped Chávez manage his Twitter account. Twitter eventually grew to be the most popular social media site in Venezuela, with Venezuelans being some of the largest Twitter users in the world.

Under President Maduro, the Venezuelan government used tens of thousands of Twitter bots to disseminate its propaganda and ideology for support. Oxford Internet Institute's Computational Propaganda Research Project found that Venezuela often uses bots to disseminate social media posts. Another study by the Utah State University Data Science Lab finding such activity, with professor Kyumin Lee stating that findings "conclude that there is a bot alliance". Twitter has deactivated about 6,000 bots used by the Venezuelan government. Since 2014, the Ministry of Popular Power for Communication and Information has sent out messages for supporters, state media workers, ministries, and other government institutions to repeat. The Venezuelan government also created a mobile app that automatically retweets President Maduro's tweets.

On 31 January 2019, Twitter deleted thousands of fake accounts linked to the governments of Iran, Russia and Venezuela, stating that the accounts would work in unison to influence international policy. Approximately 2,000 fake accounts from Venezuela were deleted.

On 29 September 2019 The New York Times, quoting Social Science One investigator Ariel Sheen, reported that Venezuela also had a large presence of sock puppets accounts on Facebook that were engaged in coordinated, inauthentic behavior

=== Print ===
In 1999, Chávez began to promote his revolution through print media, mostly in local newspapers like Barreto’s Correo del Presidente, focusing the messages on the transformation of Venezuela into a first world nation within ten years.

In September 2014, days after it was reported that some private newspapers stated that their paper reserves had been depleted, President Maduro announced the creation of two state newspapers that he said the "Vice President of Advertising will activate a set of propaganda brigades move out to the street, to the public". Along with the two proposed state newspapers, the Venezuelan government publishes four other newspapers, Correo del Orinoco, Ciudad Caracas, Ciudad Valencia and Ciudad Petare. In October 2014, the Vice President of The Commission of Propaganda, Agitation and Communication of the PSUV, Ernesto Villegas announced the Venezuelan government's acquisition of Diario VEA, where President of the National Assembly Diosdado Cabello commented on the acquisition stating "having our own media is one of the goals for this year. God willing, in the following days we could have a newspaper, for which we are already doing everything relevant to occur."

=== Billboards and murals ===
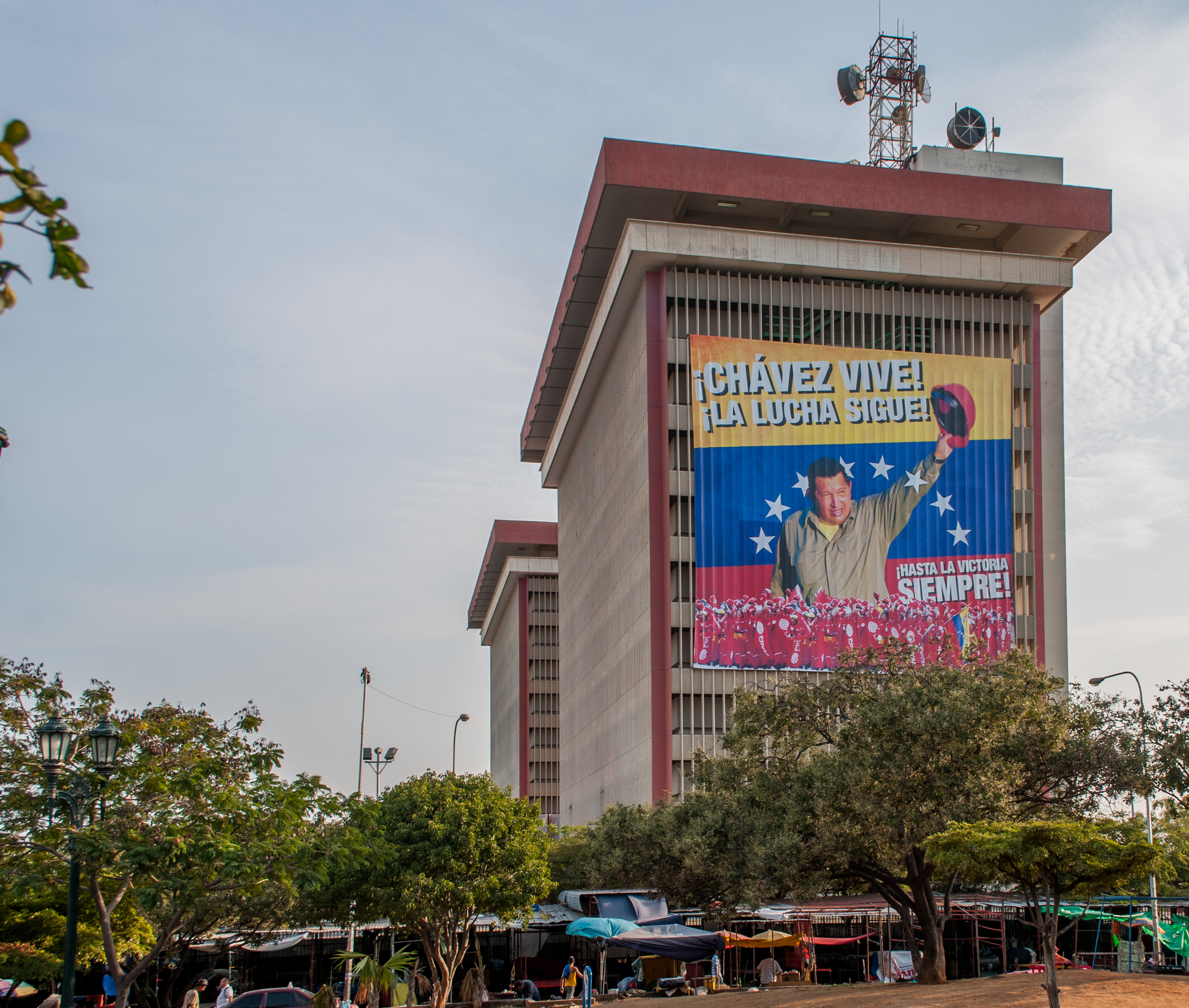
Chavez seen on the Zulia headquarters of PDVSA despite a constitutional ban of political propaganda on public buildings

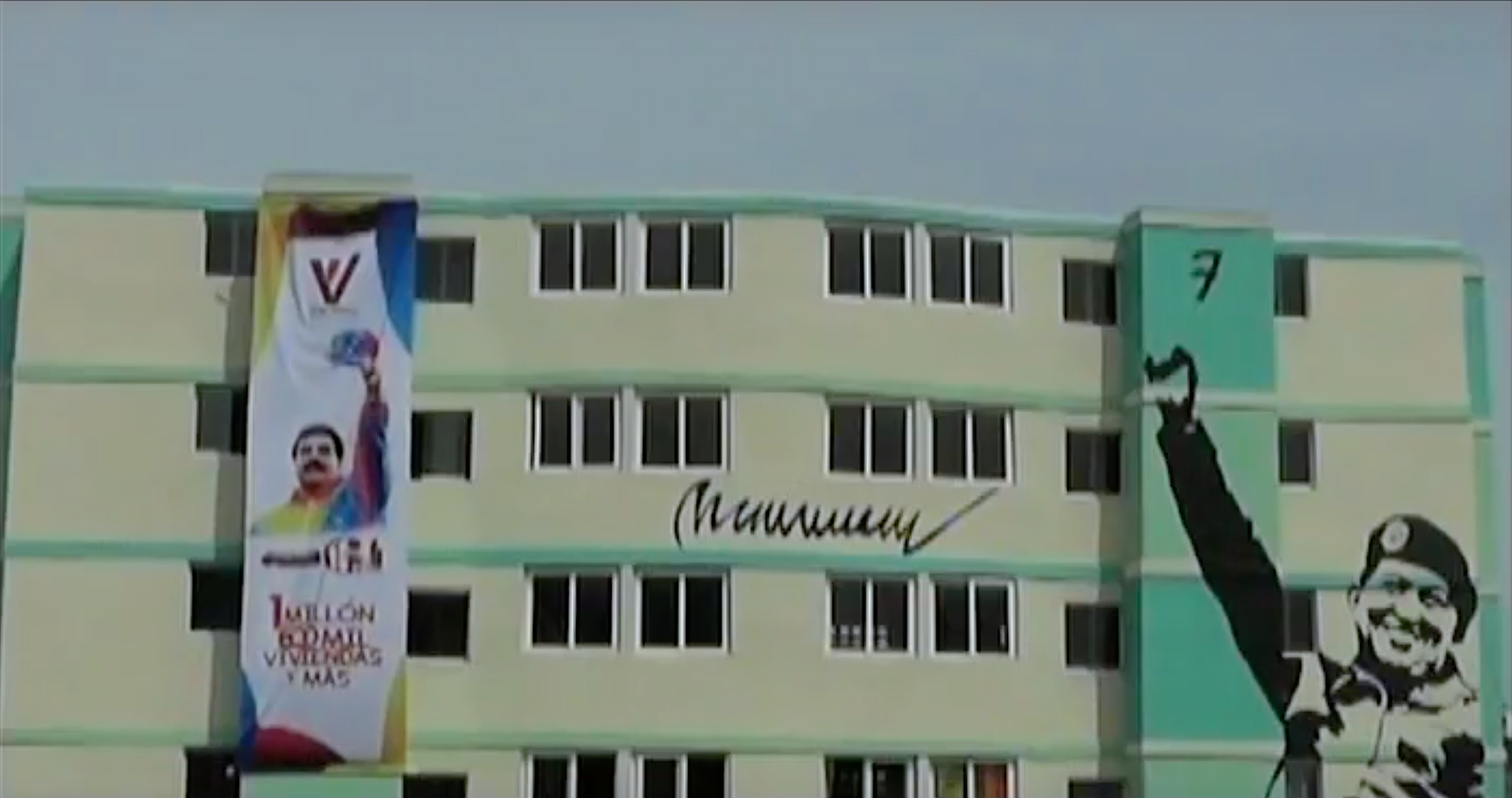
Propaganda is often incorporated with public housing provided to citizens. Images of Chávez and Maduro, as well as President Maduro's painted signature, cover this government-supplied housing facility.

In Venezuela, Chávez's face can be seen on tens of thousands of billboards, posters and buildings throughout the country, usually accompanied by accomplishments of "socialist reforms". The images are "meant to inspire ideological fervor, political loyalty, and reverence".

The Venezuelan government requires the "name, image or figure" of Hugo Chávez to be authorized before being applied to public spaces. At the PDVSA headquarters in Caracas, large banners of Chavez appeared on the building despite the constitutional ban on political propaganda on public institutions. According to BBC, there are dozens of pro-Chavez groups that apply graffiti in Venezuela with most of them being government-sponsored. Government-sponsored works in imagery are prominent in Caracas that link liberators, revolutionaries, and leftist icons to socialist ideals. Individuals included in the government imagery are Simon Bolivar, Che Guevara, and Hugo Chávez.

During the 2012 Venezuelan presidential elections, the eastern region of Venezuela had Chávez propaganda covered the region with articles such billboards and banners, supposedly due to the lost support of the Venezuelan government in the area due to oil refinery incidents and other environmental hazards.

By 2022, a Bloomberg article stated that "spaces once littered with Chavista propaganda" were being replaced by a shift to more capitalist advertising.

=== Film ===
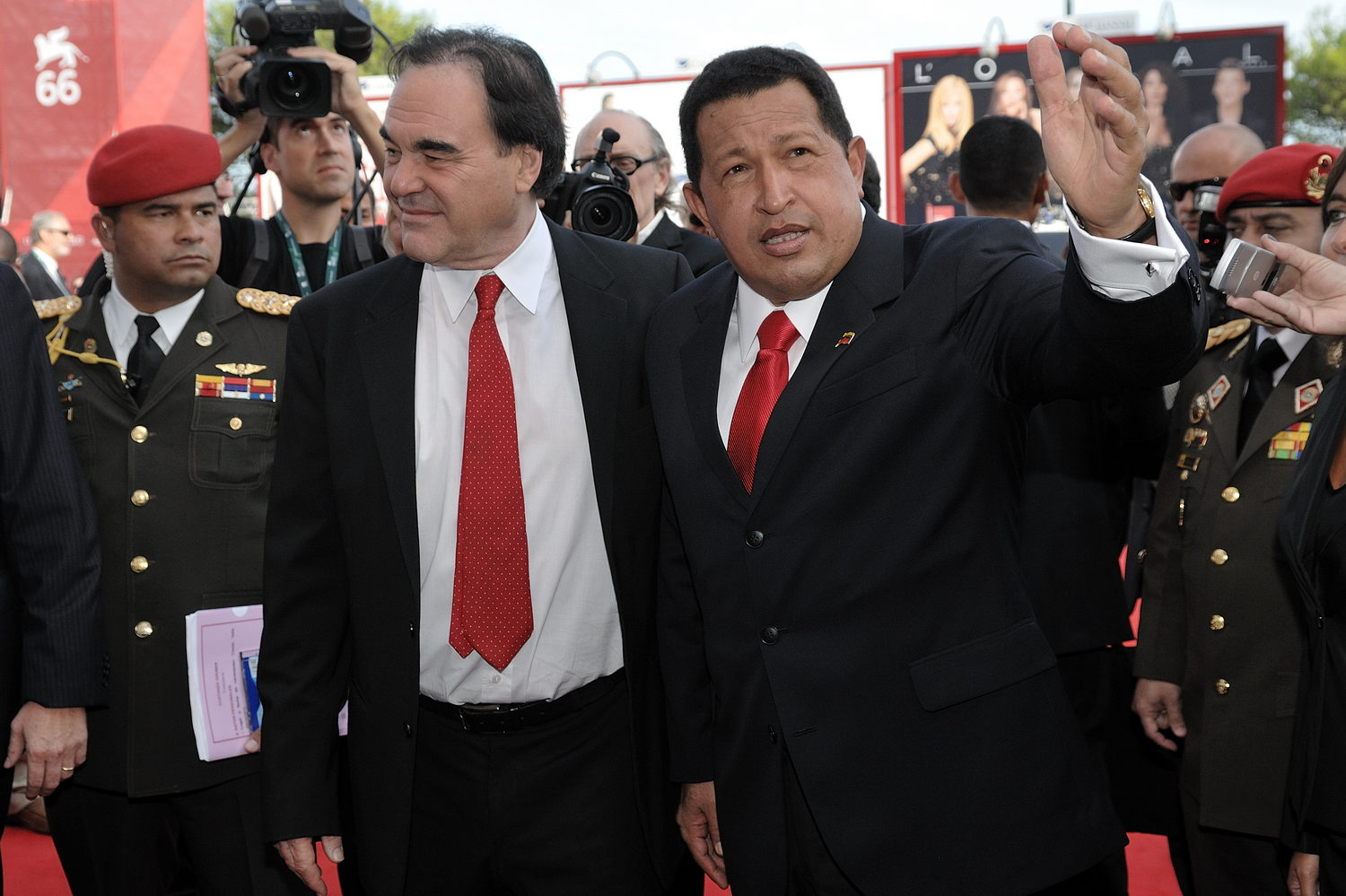
Chávez with Oliver Stone in 2009

Villa del Cine, a state-owned film and television studio started in 2006, has also been criticized as a "propaganda factory", according to Nichols and Morse and independent film makers. Chávez said that Villa del Cine would help break the "dictatorship of Hollywood".

The Irish documentary The Revolution Will Not Be Televised "became an influential advocate overseas for Chávez's version [of the coup], casting him as a romantic hero". Advocacy groups of the Bolivarian government, such as Global Exchange and the Venezuela Information Office, showed it at events. The Bolivarian government also used it to build support for Chávez and the film is often seen in Venezuelan television broadcasts or is used during "contentious political conjunctures".

In 2009, Oliver Stone completed a feature-length documentary, South of the Border about the rise of populist governments in Latin America, featuring seven presidents include Hugo Chávez of Venezuela. Stone hoped the film would get the rest of the Western world to rethink socialist policies in South America, particularly as it was being applied by Hugo Chávez. Chávez joined Stone for the premiere of the documentary at the Venice International Film Festival in September 2009.

== Conspiracy allegations ==
According to The Economist, "Media conspiracies have been a staple of government propaganda" since Chávez was briefly ousted in 2002. After the 2002 Venezuelan coup d'état attempt, conspiracy theories by the Venezuelan government and supporters were pointed at an alleged involvement of the United States in the coup. Foreign Policy states that "such rhetoric can be vital to propagating the siege mentality that is the main remaining source of legitimacy for the socialist regime Chávez built".

The Associated Press stated that "the Chavez administration tended to point fingers at the CIA or shadowy outside groups" while President Maduro would "often target local opposition figures". During Chávez's tenure, there were 63 alleged assassination and coup plots while in the first 15 months of Maduro's presidency, he has denounced dozens. Conspiracy theories by the Venezuelan government rarely involved evidence. Some pro-government members have "accused conspirators of using newspaper crossword puzzles to communicate with enemies of the state, of developing tools to give leftist leaders cancer, and of plotting to 'ruin Christmas' with a coup included." During the 2014 Venezuelan protests, President Maduro also alleged that the protests were "orchestrated and directed by political and financial elites in the United States" and were a coup in progress.

The Associated Press notes that although to foreigners "the allegations can seem far-fetched", "the charges don't seem that wild" to government supporters. The reason for these beliefs of government supporters provided states that Venezuelans are "well-versed" about the United States' involvement against leftist governments during the Cold War and how the United States endorsed the 2002 coup. According to critics, the conspiracies brought forth by the Venezuelan government take attention away from domestic problems, such as a high inflation rate, high murder rate and shortages. Gregory Weeks, a political science professor specializing in Latin America at the University of North Carolina said that conspiracy theories are "one way that the Maduro administration has added extra paranoia to its strategy" and that "Chavez went after local opposition, too, but he didn't feel the need to use conspiracy theories to do so."

== Education ==
Brian A. Nelson says in The Silence and the Scorpion that opposition to Chávez was "born [when] a group of mothers realized that their children's new textbooks were really Cuban schoolbooks heavily infused with revolutionary propaganda". According to Nichols and Morse in the book Venezuela (Latin America in Focus), the "Bolivarian curriculum" that was instituted to reflect Chávez's goals was against a 1980 law that prohibited political propaganda in schools. The Venezuelan government released 35 million books to primary and secondary schools called the Bicentennial Collection, which have "political content" in each book, that over 5 million children had used between 2010 and 2014. According to Leonardo Carvajal of the Assembly of Education in Venezuela, the collection of books had "become a vulgar propaganda". Venezuelan historian Inés Quintero stated that in all social science books, "there is an abuse of history, ... a clear trend favoring the current political project and the political programs of the Government". According to Reuters, the first page of each of the newly implemented textbooks for children reads, "Hugo Chávez: Supreme Commander of the Bolivarian Revolution".

In 2007, the Venezuelan government announced plans of a new curriculum for education. The journalist Andrea Montilla claimed in El Nacional that the new curriculum "seeks to impose socialism as the only ideology in the schools". In 2014, the government made a new effort to implement the proposed curriculum. In April 2014, the government had students answer questionnaires with questions such as "How do you would like your school?" and other questions involving teachers. There were also questions asking about the "teaching or learning of how to help achieve the objectives of Plan de la Patria". The Venezuelan Chamber of Private Education refused to take part in the proposed plan, with their education specialist, Mariano Herrera, warning that the project "has political bias". Orlando Alzuru, president of the Venezuelan Federation of Teachers (FVM), said that "the new Bolivarian curriculum is also biased and is being used to worship the figure of Chávez" and continued saying "[we] see with astonishment that the government is forcing teachers to sing the Patria Querida hymn".

Patricia Andrade, president of the NGO Venezuela Awareness, said that the new books involved in the governments new curriculum "contain a high load of ideological doctrine of socialism" and that "the books eliminate critical thinking of children and create the basis for indoctrination into a single ideology, which is the ideology of the Bolivarian Revolution". Math books have "frequent references to social benefit programs introduced by Chávez". In history books, there is only one page explaining Venezuela's last 40 years of democracy while there are over twenty pages devoted to Chávez. According to Maria Teresa Clement, Secretary of Communication of the Venezuelan Federation of Teachers, the changes to the history books "revolves around the role played by a single president [Chávez], as if the previous historical record was irrelevant". Other books also include anti-capitalist attitudes and show "economic sectors of the country and the U.S. as the great enemies of the country". One text "ensures economic groups launched a coup with the help of United States sent ships to invade Venezuelan waters".

In 2014, an assembly of teachers on the islands of Margarita and Coche demanded an end to "the indoctrination of children by educators" at the regional and national level, claiming that the days between the 5 and 15 of March were aimed "to worship former late President Hugo Chávez".

The president of the Venezuelan Chamber of Private Education, María Teresa Hernández claims that Resolution 058 by the government is "unconstitutional" and that it "seeks for colectivos with political projects of the ruling to be directly involved in public and private schools" in Venezuela. She continued saying that schoolchildren are "very easy to manipulate" and need to develop political beliefs on their own.

== Venezuelan military ==
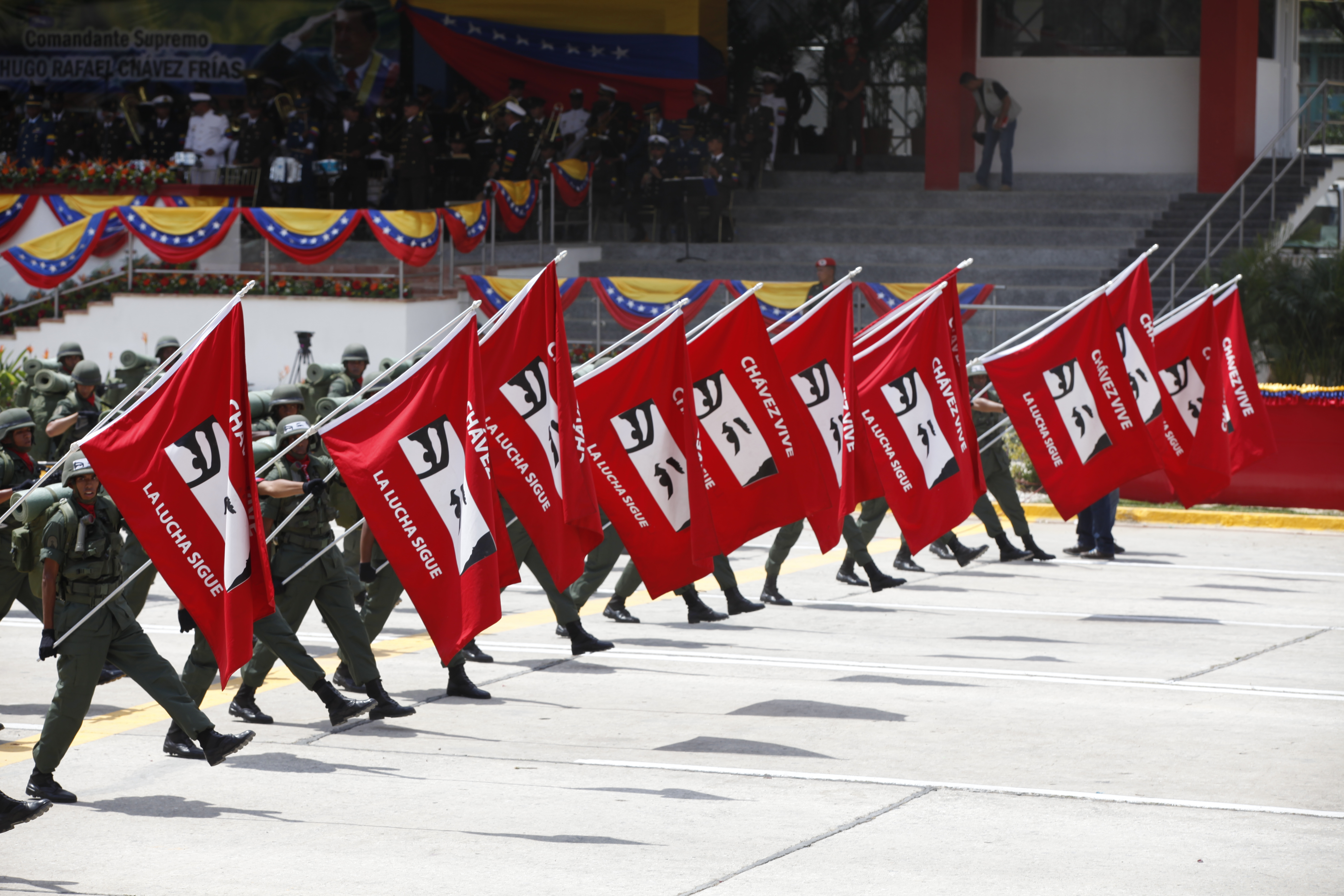
Members of the Venezuelan armed forces carrying Chávez eyes flags saying, "Chávez lives, the fight continues".

In Chávez's Children: Ideology, Education, and Society in Latin America, Manuel Anselmi explains that "To get an idea of the importance of Bolivarian propaganda as a source of alternative political education one can use the testimony of Hugo Chávez himself". Chávez explained how he had "read the classics of socialism and of military theory and study the possible role of the army in a democratic popular revolt".

== Elections ==
=== Chávez's electoral campaigns ===
The way Chávez designed the electoral system and the fast rate of elections assisted him since his opposition did not have the same amount of resources and funding that he had. During election campaigns, Chávez was portrayed in many ways; such as being an athlete. An advertisement promoting housing built by the government told the story of a man who received housing and made the statement: "First God, then my commander" (referring to Chávez with the latter). His "election propaganda" also involved murals, effigies and art representing Chávez's eyes.

According to William J. Dobson, author of The Dictator's Learning Curve: Inside the Global Battle for Democracy, "Chávez didn’t fear elections; he embraced them" because "[r]ather than stuffing ballot boxes, Chávez understood that he could tilt the playing field enough to make it nearly impossible to defeat him". Dobson continued saying that "Chávez’s campaign coffers were fed by opaque slush funds holding billions in oil revenue. The government’s media dominance drowned out the opposition."

=== Maduro's electoral campaigns ===
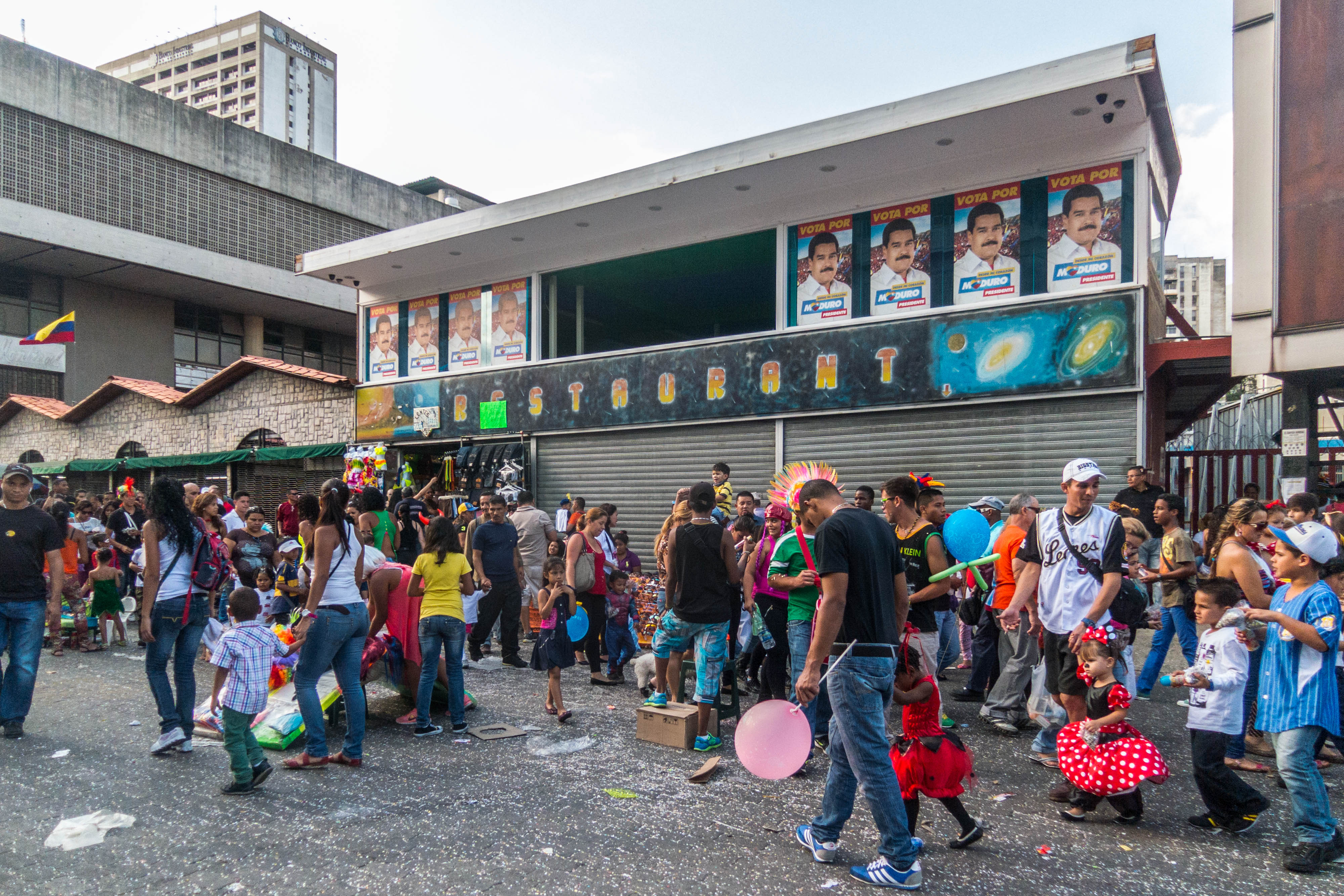
Multiple signs of Nicolás Maduro from the 2013 presidential election

According to the Organization of American States' Inter-American Commission on Human Rights, Nicolás Maduro "has continued to use obligatory national radio and television broadcasts to transmit government messages" and that "the use of obligatory national broadcasts intensified during the campaign and in the days following the April 2013 presidential elections, on a number of occasions interrupting speeches or press conferences given by leaders of groups in opposition to the government".

Andrés Oppenheimer stated in a Pittsburgh Tribune-Review article that Maduro had a much larger advantage in the 2013 presidential elections saying that the elections were "one of the most uneven electoral contests anywhere in recent times". Oppenheimer said that when Maduro was acting as interim president, when he extended mourning for Hugo Chávez's death it gave "a huge propaganda advantage to Maduro". He also explained that Maduro had "a more than 10-1 advantage in television propaganda time", where Capriles was only allowed 4 minutes of advertising per day, Maduro had the same 4 minutes, 10 minutes for government public service ads and an unlimited amount of time for "obligatory national broadcast speeches".

Following the 2018 presidential elections, President Maduro was observed on state-media waving to a supposed audience during a victory speech, though later footage showed that he was waving to an imaginary crowd in what was described as a propaganda stunt.

== International ==
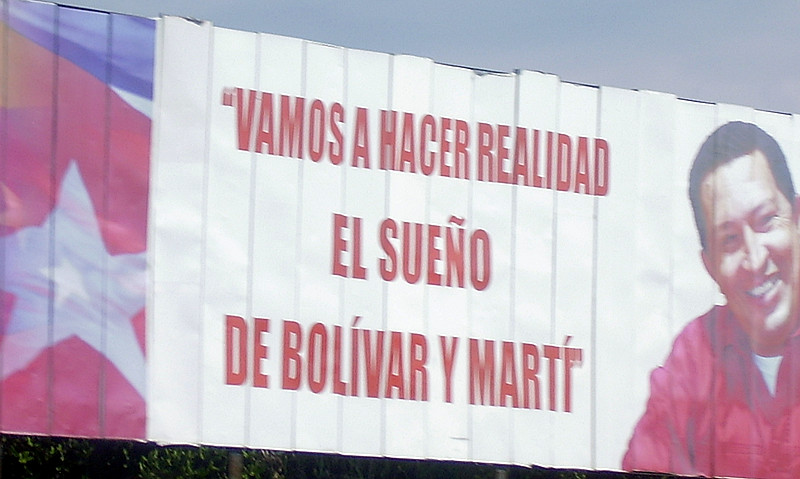
A billboard in Havana showing the Cuban Flag and Chávez, including the quote, "We will make the dream of Bolivar and Marti a reality".

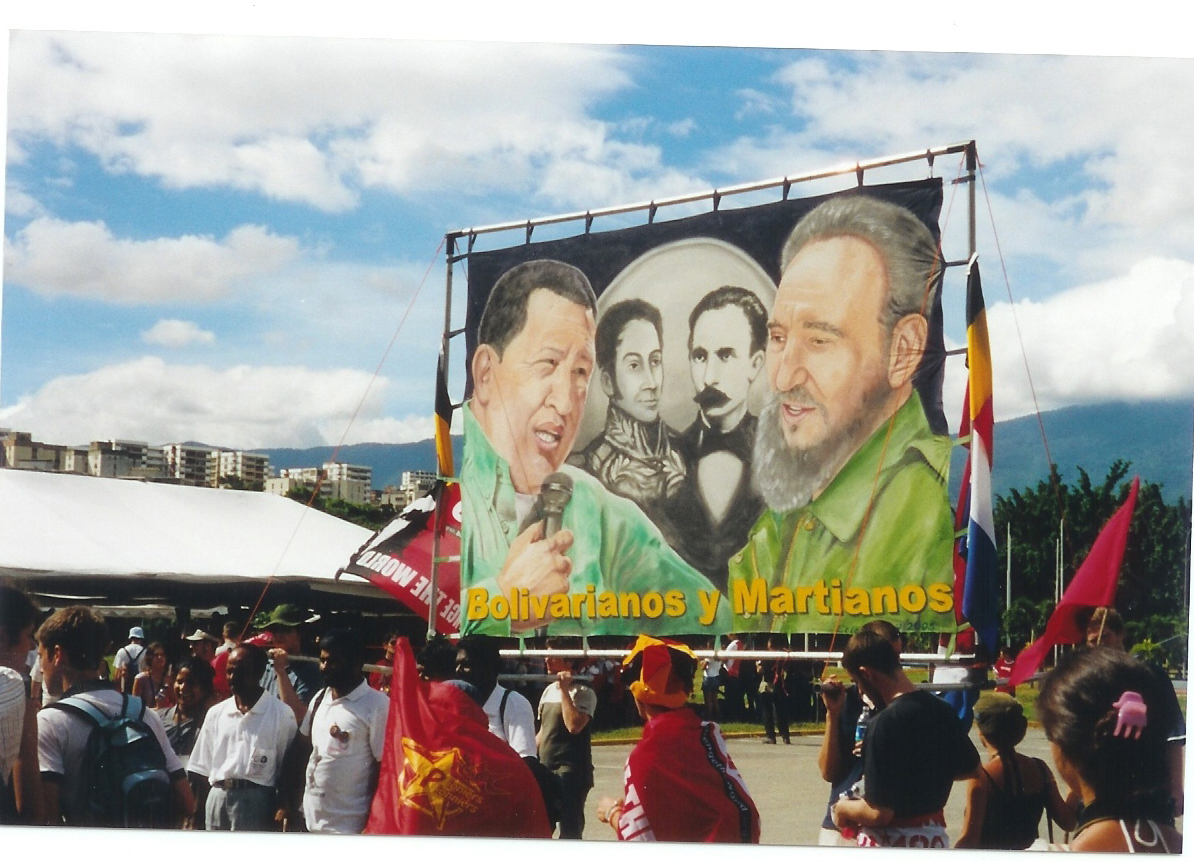
A banner held during the 2005 World Festival of Youth and Students featuring Chávez and Castro alongside Bolivar and Martí saying, "Bolivarians and Martinians".

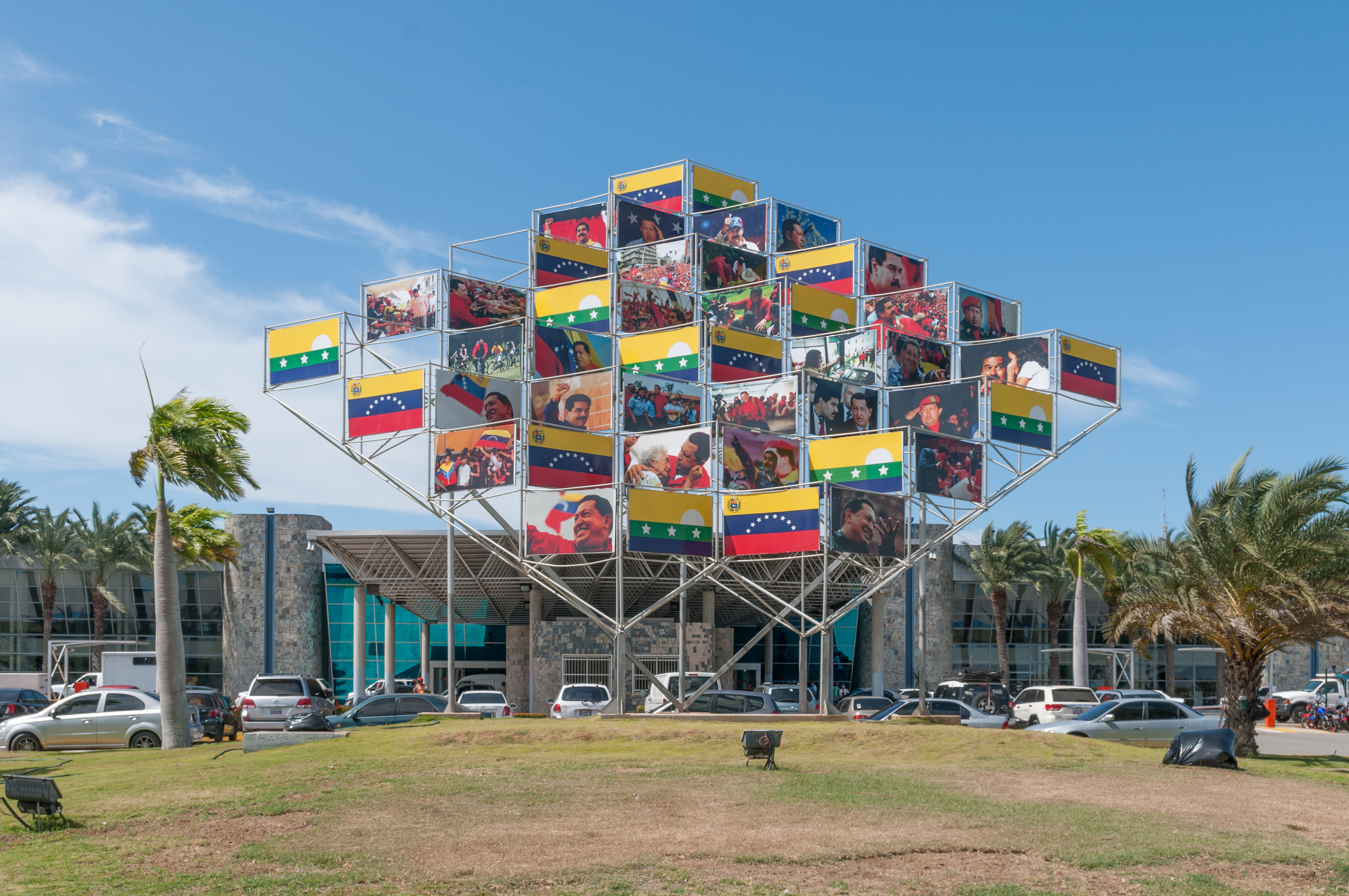
Santiago Mariño International Airport, with pictures of Nicolás Maduro and Hugo Chavez.

In The Rhetoric of Soft Power: Public Diplomacy in Global Contexts by Craig Hayden, it is explained that Venezuela is "well positioned to develop strategic communication programs, given its oil-related revenues" and that Venezuela "invested considerable resources" in order to "amplify the possibilities of the 'Bolivarian Revolution' for regional integration". The Bolivarian government would also use "supportive statements from allied regimes" while the such regimes would "routinely back each other up publicly, adding credence to their propaganda and jointly discrediting Western media outlets and unallied foreign governments in order to minimise the impact of future criticism". The Bolivarian government would also use the support of "heads of state and left-leaning international celebrities, such as Naomi Campbell, Danny Glover, and Sean Penn" for propaganda purposes.

In 2001, the United States Assistant Secretary of State for Western Hemisphere Affairs, Peter F. Romero stated that "Bolivarian propaganda" of both Chávez and then defense secretary José Vicente Rangel was not just verbal, that there were "indications that the government of Chávez has supported violent indigenous movements in Bolivia, and in the case of Ecuador, military coup members" and called both individuals "professional agitators."

=== Brazil ===
In November 2014, the Federal Public Ministry of Brazil accused Elías Jaua of taking 26 children from Brazil since 2011 "in order to be indoctrinated in the Bolivarian revolution" and were allegedly used for Venezuelan government communication brigades.

=== Ecuador ===
In an El Nuevo Herald report, former Venezuelan intelligence officials from SEBIN presented evidence that the Venezuelan government allegedly worked through both the Patriotas Cooperantes and Mission Barrio Seguro programs to "promote their revolutionary ideology" through members of the programs. Former SEBIN officials also stated that some members of the program were also "providing information on potential enemies of the revolutionary process".

=== Mexico ===
According to La Crónica de Hoy, in 2006, students that were supported by Venezuelan agents printed "Bolivarian propaganda in favor of Andrés Manuel López Obrador" a leftist presidential candidate. Bolivarian Circles were reportedly formed and received "economic support, logistic advice and ideological instruction from activists trained by the Venezuelan government" and had links according to intelligence reports with FARC, the Popular Revolutionary Army and the Ejército Revolucionario del Pueblo Insurgente (Ejército Revolucionario del Pueblo Insurgente).

=== Palestine ===
In November 2014, Palestinian students who aspired to be doctors were accepted into Venezuela through the Venezuelan government's Yasser Arafat Scholarship Program to earn medicine degrees. Months later in July 2015, dozens of students had already left Venezuela and began to drop out, stating that the Venezuelan government program "consisted only of Spanish language lessons and indoctrination about Venezuela’s 16-year-old socialist revolution". The departure of the students resulted in the freezing of the program.

=== Spain ===
In Madrid, former Foreign Minister Elias Jaua introduced a cultural center that would tell the history of Venezuela and allegedly promoted the cult of personality of Chavez. In a November 2014 conference, photos of Hugo Chávez surrounded the audience and accused the Spanish Crown of destroying the Venezuelan economy.

According to ABC, Venezuelan radio and television transmitted in Spain portrays a happy Venezuela that is free of conflict which the newspaper says "exists only in the minds of the official propaganda designed to extend the legacy of the late Hugo Chávez". ABC states that TeleSUR, which is primarily sponsored by Venezuelan state funds, spread the Bolivarian ideology throughout Spain since it was introduced in 2007. TeleSUR partners with Spanish channel Tele K, which is also home to Pablo Iglesias Turrión. Iglesias was then quoted by Enrique Riobóo, founder and director of Channel 33 for Tele K, as a supporter for the creation of an independent TeleSUR channel for Europe and cooperation of media between Venezuela and Spain.

=== United States ===
Between 2004 and 2009, Venezuela spent about $1 billion on propaganda directed towards the public in the United States and Western countries. Gustavo Coronel, writing in Human Events, said that Chávez has a costly and "intense propaganda machine" operating via the Venezuelan Embassy in the United States that attempted to tell Americans "that Hugo Chávez is universally loved by Venezuelans while the United States is bitterly hated". A 2005–2009 Citgo program to donate heating oil to poor household in the United States was seen by critics "as a propaganda stunt."

==== Global Exchange ====
In The Threat Closer to Home: Hugo Chávez and the War Against America, one of the Venezuelan government's propaganda methods discussed included the use of politically focused tourism for Americans. The Venezuelan government called upon the advocacy group Global Exchange to attract citizens from the United States with discounted travel packages. According to the Capital Research Center, Global Exchange had been "spearheading much of Venezuela's U.S. propaganda campaign" offering what were called "reality tours" to Americans. The tours were described as being Potemkin-like by a European diplomat, being "planned down to the last detail" in order to promote the Bolivarian Revolution and anti-American sentiments to the tourists. The tourists saw the PDVSA headquarters for choreographed meetings, experienced trips to various Venezuelan government facilities, visits to missions against poverty or socialism groups and a meeting with the electoral commission. The New York Times and BBC News stated that the tours also included meetings with Venezuelan activists such as Eva Golinger, community leaders and the tourists watched the Chávez-approving documentary The Revolution Will Not Be Televised.

==== Venezuela Information Office (VIO) ====
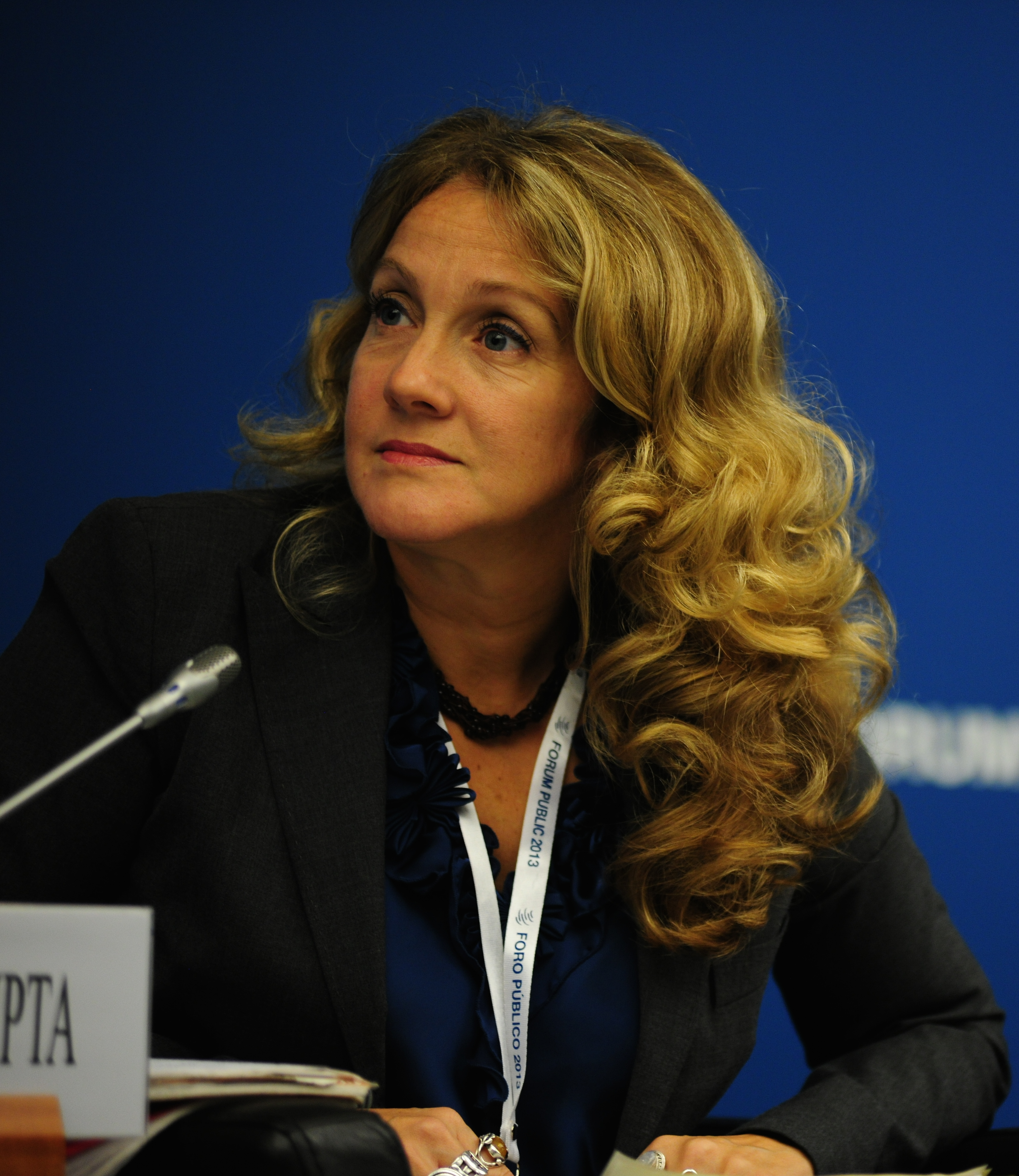
Deborah James, who was the longest serving director of the VIO, is involved with Global Exchange and CEPR.

The Venezuela Information Office (VIO) was a Washington, D.C.–based lobbying agency that had a stated mission that was "to prevent US intervention in Venezuela" and to "improve the perception of Venezuela by the American people by managing the communication process through the media". Founded in July 2003 by the Venezuelan government the VIO was funded by the Venezuelan government and therefore registered with the United States Department of Justice under the Foreign Agents Registration Act. In September 2003, VIO contacted Global Exchange in order to "ensure success" of their campaign while also discussing "ideas for strategizing on Venezuela" and "to begin conference calls of solidarity groups". In 2004, a former Global Economy Director for Global Exchange, Deborah James, became the executive director of the VIO.

Critics of the Venezuelan government state that the VIO was used for propaganda in the United States, stating that the VIO was used for one of Hugo Chávez's "modern propaganda techniques" and that they "distributed pro-Chávez flyers at anti-globalization rallies, arranged for delegations of activists to embark on 'reality tours' of Venezuela, and encouraged art-house theaters to show a propaganda movie on Chávez called The Revolution Will Not Be Televised".

In addition to maintaining a public website and a blog, VIO promoted its views in the media in a number of ways, including issuing press releases and contributing articles, such as responses to the 2008 Human Rights Watch report on Venezuela. According to public records the VIO spent $379,000 on lobbying the US Congress in the years 2004 to 2007 and received about $4,308,400 from the Venezuelan government between May 2004 and August 2008. In 2004, the VIO also contracted public relations company Lumina Strategies' Michael Shellenberger, a former Global Exchange employee, to improve the image of Hugo Chávez and of the Venezuelan government in the United States, supporting and coordinating the media relations work of the VIO.

==== Venezuelanalysis ====
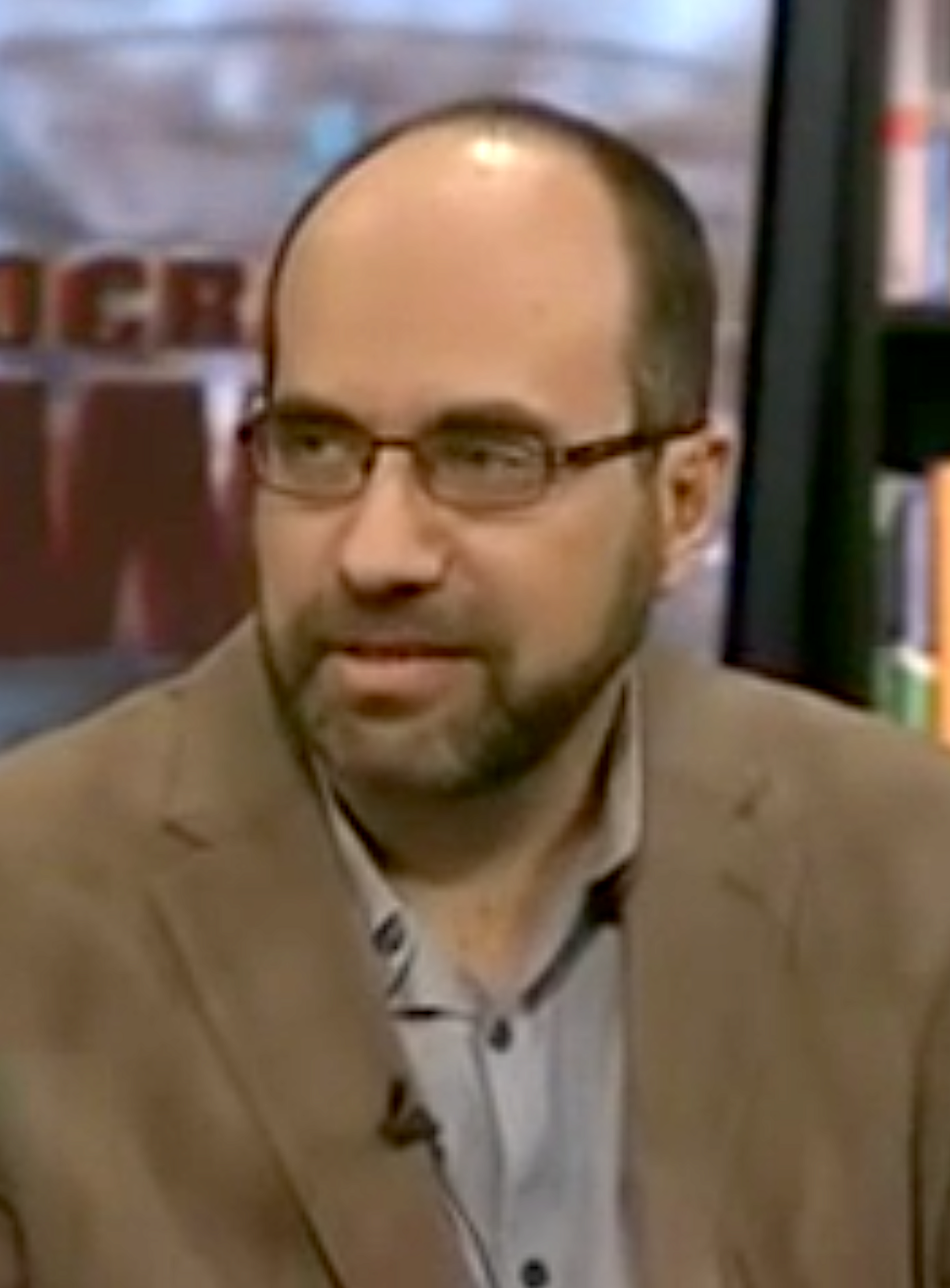
Gregory Wilpert, founder of Venezuelanalysis

Venezuelanalysis is a pro-Bolivarian website set up in 2003 following the 2002 Venezuelan coup d'état attempt, with the website being founded with the assistance of the Bolivarian government. The website is headed by Gregory Wilpert, with the GlobalPost describing Wilpert as "perhaps the most prominent Chavista", while dubbing him as a "Chavez defender". According to Brian Nelson, author of The Silence and the Scorpion, Wilpert, according to individuals in the Venezuelan government, was "an integral part of Venezuela's propaganda complex and key to their foreign service mission in the United States", with Wilpert working with Global Exchange, the Venezuelan Information Office (VIO) and his Venezuelanalysis.com website. Nelson also states that Venezuelanalysis "tried to discredit virtually every independent human rights study" during Hugo Chávez's tenure whenever the Bolivarian government was criticized.

== Hugo Chávez's cult of personality ==
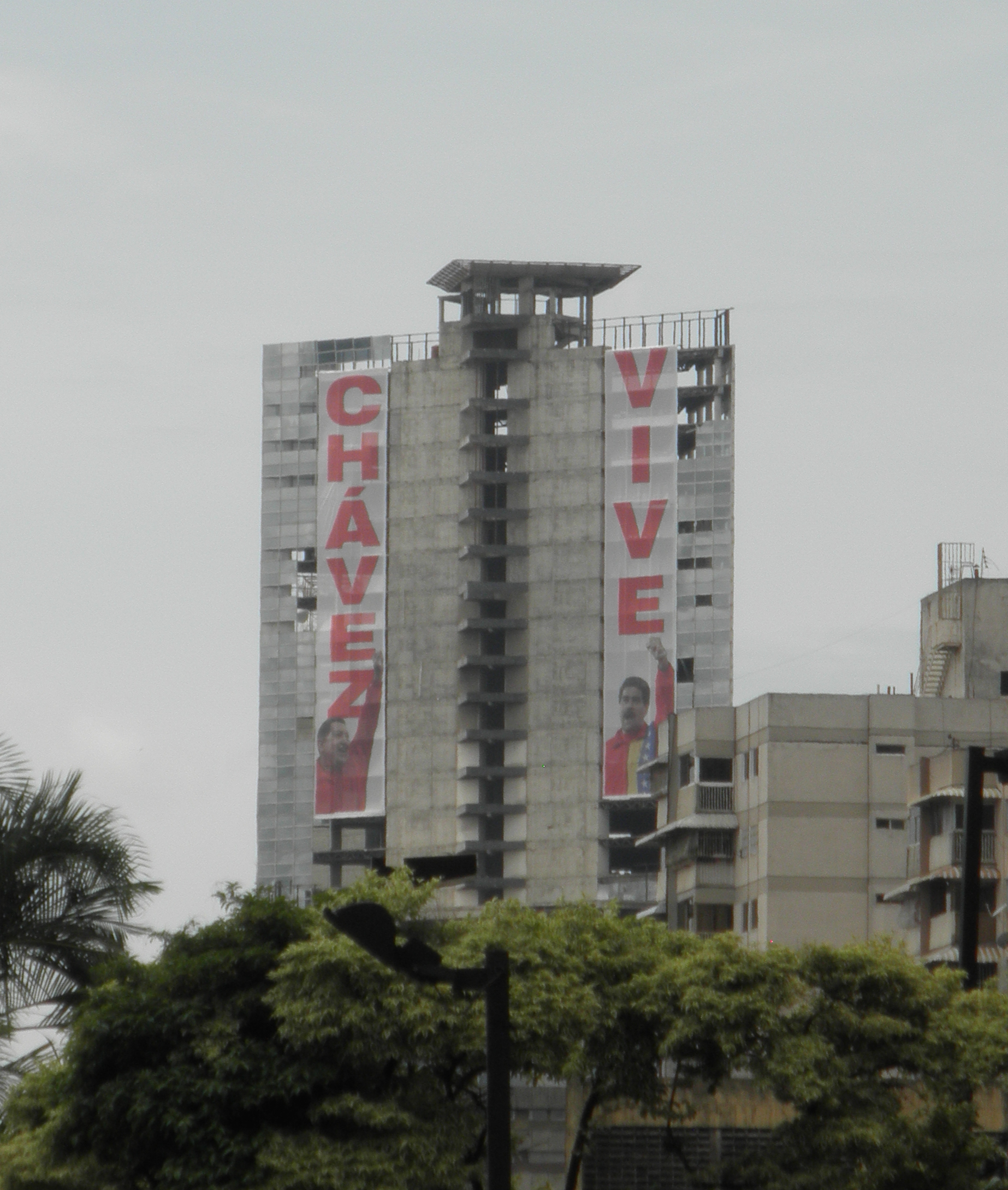
Centro Financiero Confinanzas, the third tallest building in Venezuela draped with banners saying "Chávez Lives" while featuring Chávez's successor, Nicolás Maduro.

In Venezuela, a cult of personality has been created around the late-President Hugo Chávez, where his supporters venerate him. Chávez largely received his support through his charisma and by spending Venezuela's oil funds on the poor. Since his death, followers known as "Chavistas" refer to his death as a "transition to immortality", commonly calling Chávez "the Giant", "the Eternal One", "eternal commander" and "El Comandante". There have been parallels between the veneration of Chávez to that of Evita Peron in Argentina and Kim Jong Il of North Korea.

Tomas Straka of Andres Bello University, explains that Chávez's cult of personality began following the 1992 Venezuelan coup d'état attempts which Chávez led, with Straka explaining that some Venezuelans "saw no solution to their most fundamental problems and they saw in Chávez a savior, or an avenger of those groups that had no hope". Since the beginning of Chávez's tenure in 1999, the Venezuelan government manipulated the Venezuelan public with social programs depicting him as a great leader for the people. The struggles that Chávez endured throughout his presidency, such as the 2002 Venezuelan coup d'état attempt, also drew compassion from his followers which boosted his support. According to one scholar of Latin America from the University of California Santa Barbara, Juan Pablo Lupi, the creation of Chávez's cult of personality was "very well-staged, all this process of myth-making and appealing to the feelings and religious sentiment of the people. This is something that is quasi-religious". Lupi's explanation of Chávez's cult of personality was similar to those of Juan Carlos Bertorelli, a marketing company creative director in Caracas and Larry Birns, the director of the Council on Hemispheric Affairs. Carlos Bertorelli stated that the Bolivarian government created a cult of personality surrounding Chávez in order to "maintain a presence that legitimizes them" while Birns stated that "For many in the movement, Chavez, or the movement of the Chavistas towards a religious stance, is less a matter of faith than it is a matter of strategy".

=== Religious image ===
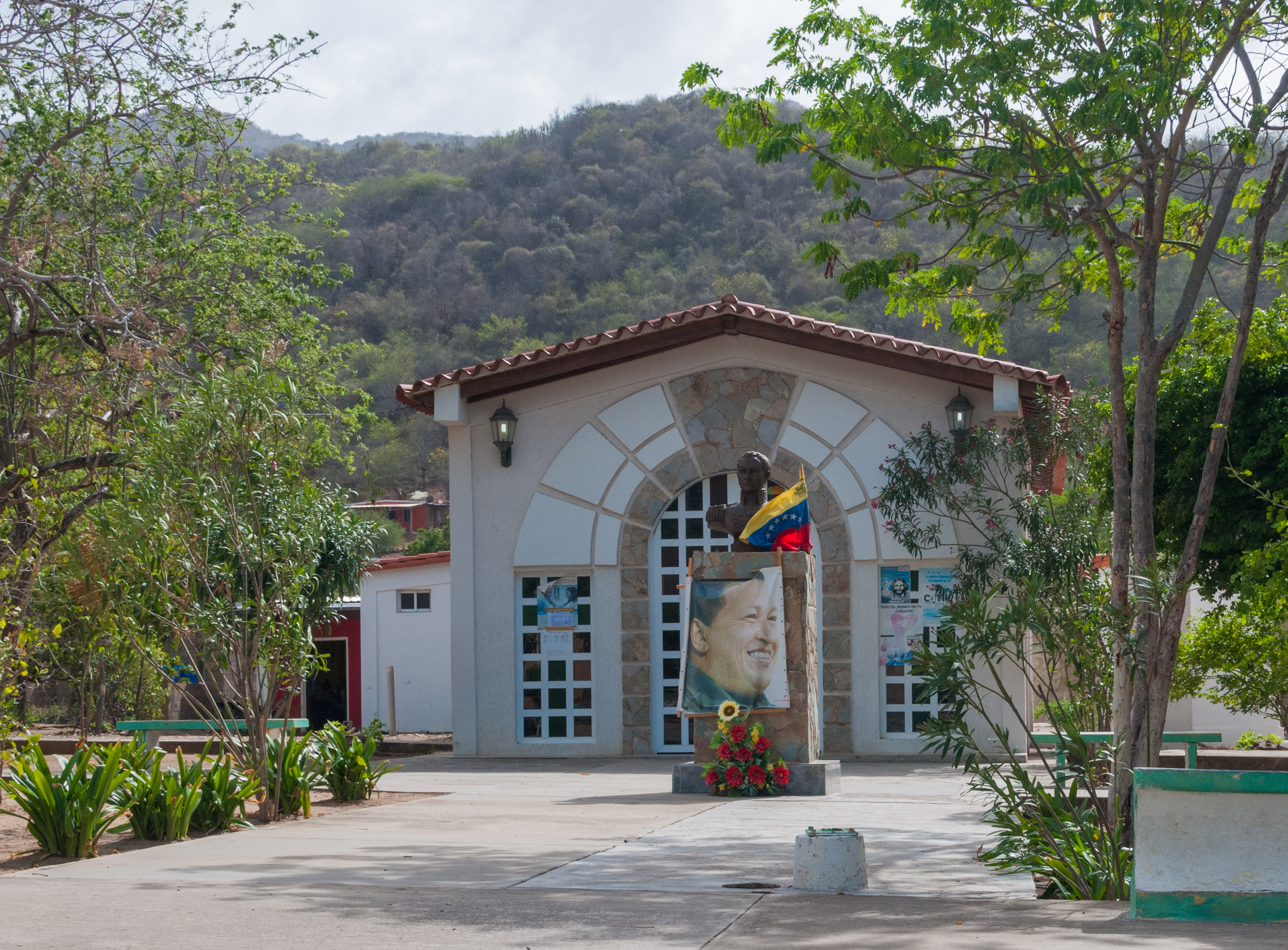
Images of Chávez and Simón Bolívar outside of a church, with such churches professing that "Chávez lives in us forever".

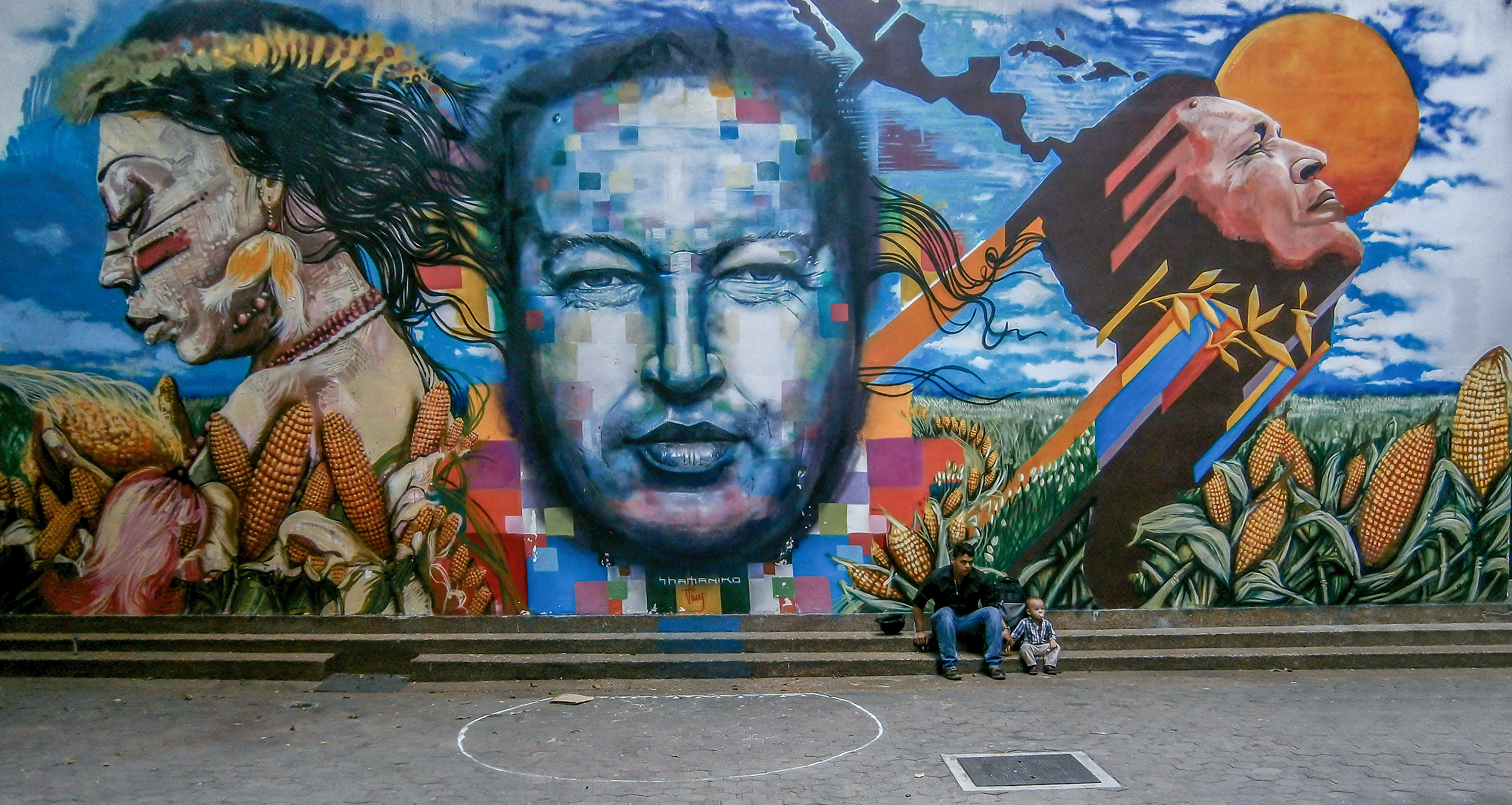
Mural of Chávez and his ascension into heaven.

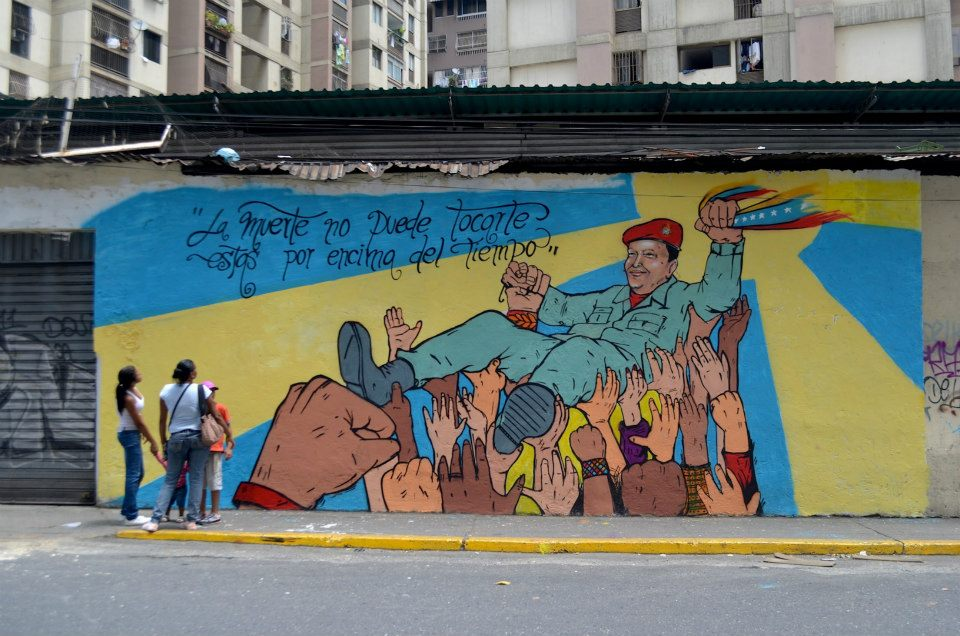
A mural of Chávez saying, "Death can not touch you, you are above time".

The Associated Press states that "Chavez's legacy has taken on a religious glow in Venezuela" and that "[r]osaries adorned with Chavez's face, shrines and images depicting him with a Christian cross have become commonplace". According to Foreign Policy, such "quasi-religious veneration of Chávez by his comrades is not known for its subtlety", stating that followers of María Lionza as well as those who practice Santería began to venerate Chávez following his death.

In 2014, those involved in education and the government's opposition accused Venezuela's new educational curriculum of making Chávez appear "messianic", as the "liberator of Venezuela", and like "the new God". In a report about Chavez's funeral Spiegel Online wrote, "His last procession is also a TV marathon, presented in the tone of a sermon, during which Chávez, the freedom fighter Simón Bolívar and Jesus Christ merge into one person."

Since Chávez's death, controversies surrounding his adoration have arisen including the recitation of the Committee on Communication and Propaganda of PSUV-Táchira's modified version of The Lord's Prayer at a PSUV gathering that was focused on Chávez. CNN reported that Christians in Venezuela were offended, saying that "the words of a prayer found in the books of Matthew and Luke in the Bible should not be changed for political propaganda or any other purposes". Another domestic reaction came from the Venezuelan newspaper La Verdad, who compared the act to something "from the mind of Joseph Goebbels, the Nazi propaganda father". The Catholic Church of Venezuela criticized the modified version in a statement signed by head figures of the organization, saying that The Lord's Prayer is "untouchable", that whoever recited the modified version would be committing the sin of idoltry. Monsignor Baltazar Porras, bishop of Mérida, said that this type of action "is nothing new" in the years following the Bolivarian Revolution and that the Venezuelan government wanted to "screw in the principles and values which the revolution wants to impose, a kind of secular religion".

Head of the Department of Latin America for Deutsche Welle, Uta Thofern, responded to the action saying that the "Bolivarian movement seems to stop being a political movement for the sake of becoming a cult fanaticism" and saying that since she was a German, she feared that the Bolivarian leaders "consciously used religious symbols and instruments, abusing the spiritual needs of people" in ways that were seen under "German dictatorships". Ennio Cardozo, a political scientist at the Central University of Venezuela, states that acts like "Our Chávez" is the Venezuelan government's "effort to sustain its legitimacy".

Maria Uribe, the Committee on Communication and Propaganda of PSUV-Táchira member who recited the "prayer" responded to the criticism saying that the "prayer of the delegates" was to reflect on "what it meant to be like Chávez" who she called "an example of solidarity, love, commitment, humanity and honesty". President Maduro rejected the Catholic Church's response saying that they were trying to implement a "new Inquisition". It was also encouraged by President Maduro for citizens of Venezuela to recite what he called a "poem" in order to follow the "values of Chavez". President of the National Assembly, Diosdado Cabello, also criticized the Catholic Church saying they should worry about more important matters.

=== Attack on image ===
A statue of Hugo Chávez destroyed in Zulia on 5 May 2017

During the 2014–17 Venezuelan protests, Venezuelans in several states attacked the image of Chávez due to its symbolic representation of the ruling Bolivarian government. A 2016 Alfredo Keller y Asociados survey found that 75% of Venezuelans disagreed with the use of Chávez statues as propaganda. In the 2017 Venezuelan protests, citizens of La Villa del Rosario burned and tore down a statue of Hugo Chávez, a display of anger compared to the destruction of Saddam Hussein's statue in Iraq as well as other instances of statue toppling during times of popular unrest. Days later in Santa Barbara, a locally made statue of Chávez was severely damage as protesters threw Molotov cocktails and other objects at the figure.

It is pretty symbolic that the citizens are venting their frustrations on the author of the Bolivarian revolution

— Eric Farnsworth, vice president of Council of the Americas

On 22 May 2017, the birthplace home of Chávez was burned by protesters in Sabaneta, Barinas – "the cradle of Chavez's revolution" – after two students were killed by the National Guard. Protesters in the area also destroyed five statues of Chávez in addition to destroying his childhood home.

Following multiple attacks on the image of Chávez, Venezuelan authorities were ordered to guard various representations of Chávez throughout the country.

== Themes ==
Bolivarianismo uses emotional arguments to gain attention, exploit the fears (either real or imagined) of the population, create external enemies for scapegoat purposes, and produce nationalism within the population, causing feelings of betrayal for support of the opposition. Whenever a problem was faced by Chávez, he would turn it to a narrative, holding Venezuela's attention and would increase efforts whenever he faced more problems. The images and messages promote ideological mobilization, including Chávez as a "liberator", the positive effects of the Bolivarian Revolution (including social reforms), and power deriving from the people. The overall goal of the Bolivarian propaganda machine is to reflect society's wants and goals for an improved Venezuela.

=== Enemies ===
==== Capitalists ====
Capitalism was attacked by the Bolivarian government with Chávez telling viewers on his program Aló Presidente that "'Love is socialism. Capitalism is hate and selfishness". Chávez once speculated that if civilization had ever existed on Mars, capitalism and imperialism may have "finished [it] off" and said it could do the same to Earth.

==== Jews ====
In a 2010 report by Tel Aviv University titled Anti-Semitism Worldwide 2010, in Venezuela, "anti-Semitic allegations are an integral part of the extreme anti-Israel propaganda of governmental and pro- Chavez circles". During Chavez's presidency, the Venezuelan Jewish community made statements at a World Jewish Congress Plenary Assembly in Jerusalem saying, "Where we live, anti-Semitism is sanctioned. It comes from the president, through the government, and into the media."

B'nai B'rith International stated in a 2012 report that "State-sanctioned anti-Semitic and anti-Israel rhetoric" was "common in Venezuela under President Hugo Chávez" and that it had increased during the 2012 presidential campaign involving Henrique Capriles Radonski, who had Jewish heritage. According to the Antisemitism in Venezuela 2013 report by the Venezuelan Confederation of Israelite Associations (CAIV), "distorted news, omissions and false accusations" of Israel originate from Iran's Press TV and Hispan TV, are repeated by the Russia's RT and Cuba's Prensa Latina, and Venezuela's state media, including SiBCI, AVN, TeleSUR, Venezolana de Televisión (VTV), Alba TV, La Radio del Sur, Radio Nacional de Venezuela (RNV), YVKE Mundial, Correo del Orinoco and Ciudad CCS. The CAIV continues, stating that the media accuses Zionism of being a "predator movement", that "anti-Semitic authors pretend to establish differences between Jewish religion and the Zionist movement" and that the Venezuelan government's media uses antisemitic themes.

Writing in The Weekly Standard in 2005, Thor Halvorssen says that the United States Department of State's Bureau of Democracy, Human Rights, and Labor's "Report on Global Anti-Semitism" noted that antisemitic leaflets "were available to the public in an Interior and Justice Ministry office waiting room."

In 2008, a radio host on the state-run Radio Nacional de Venezuela stated that "Hitler's partners were Jews. ... These were not the Jews murdered in the concentration camps. [Those killed] were working-class Jews, Communist Jews, poor Jews, because the rich Jews were the ones behind the plan to occupy Palestine". In April 2011, Cristina González, a popular radio host from Radio Nacional de Venezuela, highly recommended her listeners to read The Protocols of the Elders of Zion, an antisemitic text created by the Russian Empire and was later used by Adolf Hitler. A year later in a 13 February 2012 opinion article by Radio Nacional de Venezuela, titled "The Enemy is Zionism" attacked Capriles' Jewish ancestry and linked him with Jewish national groups because of a meeting he had held with local Jewish leaders, saying, "This is our enemy, the Zionism that Capriles today represents ... Zionism, along with capitalism, are responsible for 90% of world poverty and imperialist wars."

==== Opposition ====
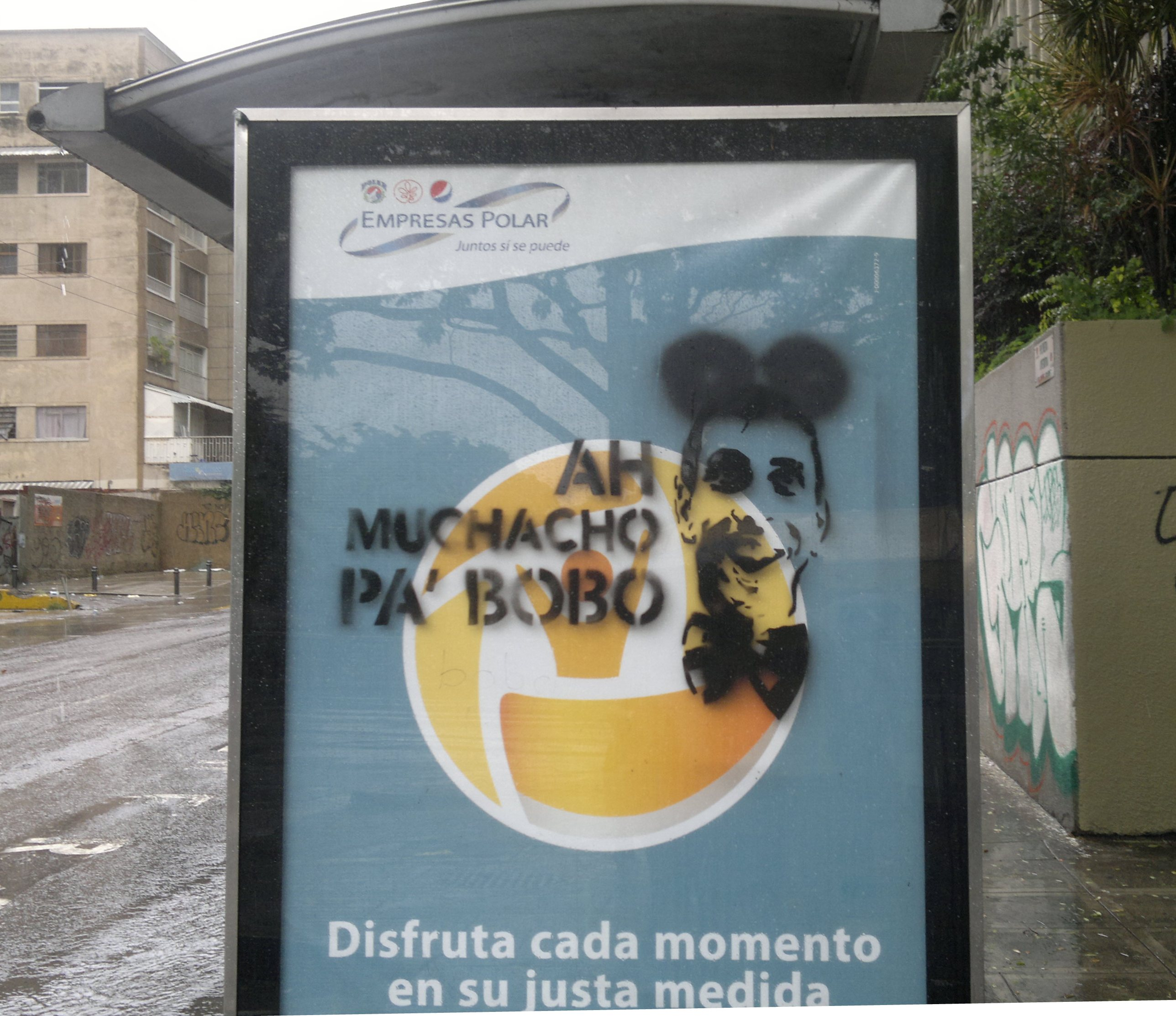
Political graffiti against Henrique Capriles from a Hugo Chávez speech saying "Ah, the stupid boy"

Enio Cardozo of the Central University of Venezuela states that the Venezuelan government uses the same propaganda tactics against the opposition that were developed by Joseph Goebbels for Nazi propaganda. Such tactics would include "simplifying the enemy" by using labels, with the Venezuelan government attempting to polarize the public into thinking that the opposition were "the wealthy" were part of an "oligarchy", blaming the opposition for any of Venezuela's woes. Another tactic would be using false stories in order to make large threats against the opposition.

Hugo Chávez described "any opposition to his government as a 'Made in the USA' corrupt, terrorist, coup-mongering plot to topple his democratic government". The opposition was often linked to adversaries of the Venezuelan government and a "sovereignty card" was used linking foreign adversaries to the opposition. While covering opposition events, the state media would manipulate images to make gatherings look smaller.

The Venezuelan government occasionally uses smear campaigns against the opposition, illegally phone tapping their conversations and playing them throughout state media. The Venezuelan government promotes the use of such recordings since they are "aimed mainly at discrediting opposition politicians", though recent phone tapped recordings used in state media are attributed to entities online instead of the Venezuelan government. One of Chávez's favorite state television shows, The Razorblade, was mainly used to attack the opposition with such tactics, using photographs and audio recording to embarrass their politicians. The source of this content was presumed to be from the country's intelligence agency, SEBIN.

==== United States imperialism ====
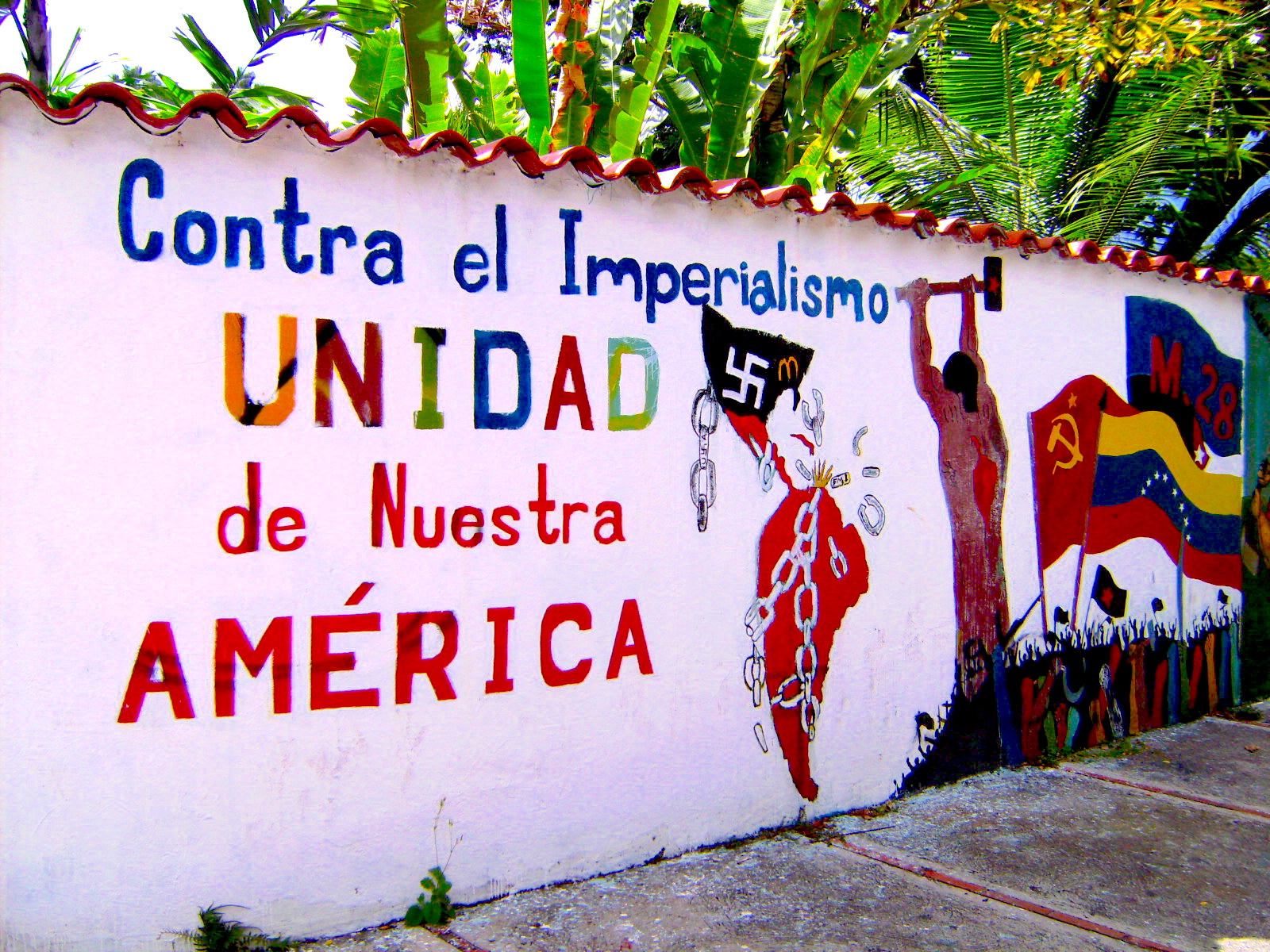
Mural against American Imperialism that is marked with a Swastika and a McDonald's logo. It reads: "Against Imperialism: The unity of Our America"

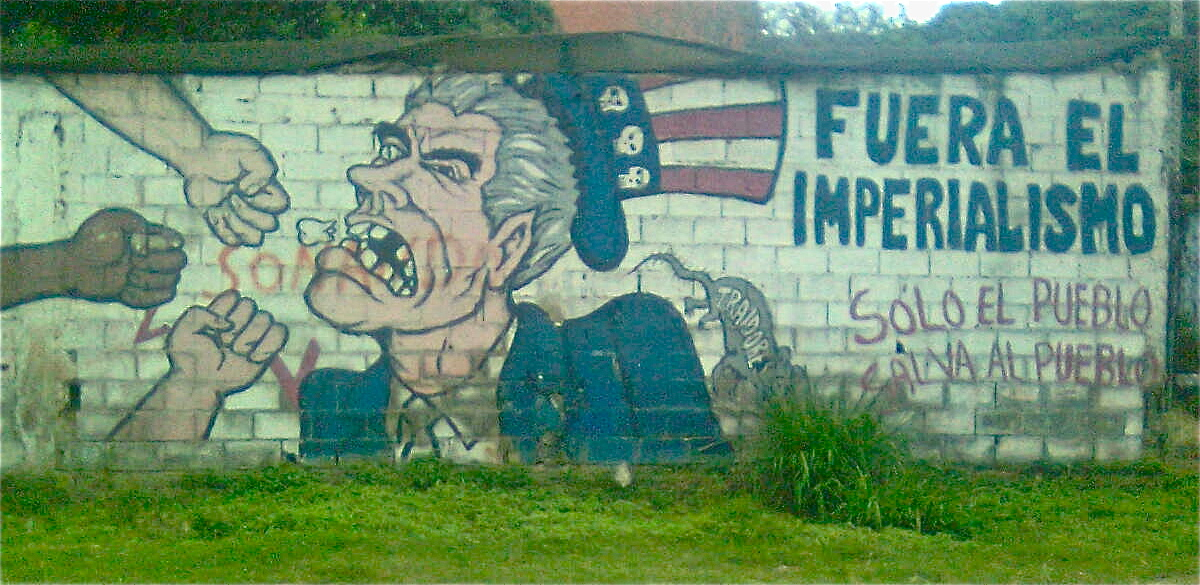
Anti-American Imperialism graffiti in a low class neighborhood of Caracas. It reads "Out to Imperialism: Only the People Saves the People"

Chávez would blame problems experienced in Venezuela on the United States. Hugo Chávez used "brash, often confounding remarks against the US, capitalism, and a bevy of other topics". Chávez called former President of the United States George W. Bush a "drunkard", "donkey" and compared him to Adolf Hitler. Chávez also made claims that the 2010 Haiti earthquake was due to a "secretive US weapons test".

At the 61st United Nations General Assembly, Hugo Chávez gave an anti-imperialist and anti-United States speech calling George W. Bush "the devil" and "world dictator". He accused Bush of spreading imperialism saying "he came to share his nostrums, to try to preserve the current pattern of domination, exploitation and pillage of the peoples of the world." He also criticized Israel due to the conflict it had with Lebanon. He then called the United Nations system "worthless" and that it had "collapsed". Chávez said that the United States promoted violence while Venezuela represented "dignity and the search for peace". After making his statements about seeking peace, Chávez asked for Venezuela to be on the United Nations Security Council saying, "Bolivar's home has sought a nonpermanent seat on the Security Council." He concluded saying that a new movement was being formulated in the south and even proposed moving the United Nations headquarters to Venezuela.

Diario VEA, a Venezuelan state newspaper critical of the United States, often used multiple pages to discredit the United States government and shared conspiracies involving the United States and its supposed links to the Venezuelan opposition.

=== Values ===
==== Democracy ====
One strategy of the Venezuelan government's propaganda was to persuade "the Venezuelan people and the international community that Chavez's Bolivarian Revolution is the true democratic road to prosperity". A common message was that Chávez was "the legitimate, legal, democratically elected leader". According to Corales and Penfold, "widespread use of elections is certainly impressive, and many consider it a sign of democratic vitality, even though electoral institutions have been openly manipulated". Elections were in fact used as an "electoral majoritarianism" argument used by Chávez to consolidate more power into his hands.

==== Social works ====
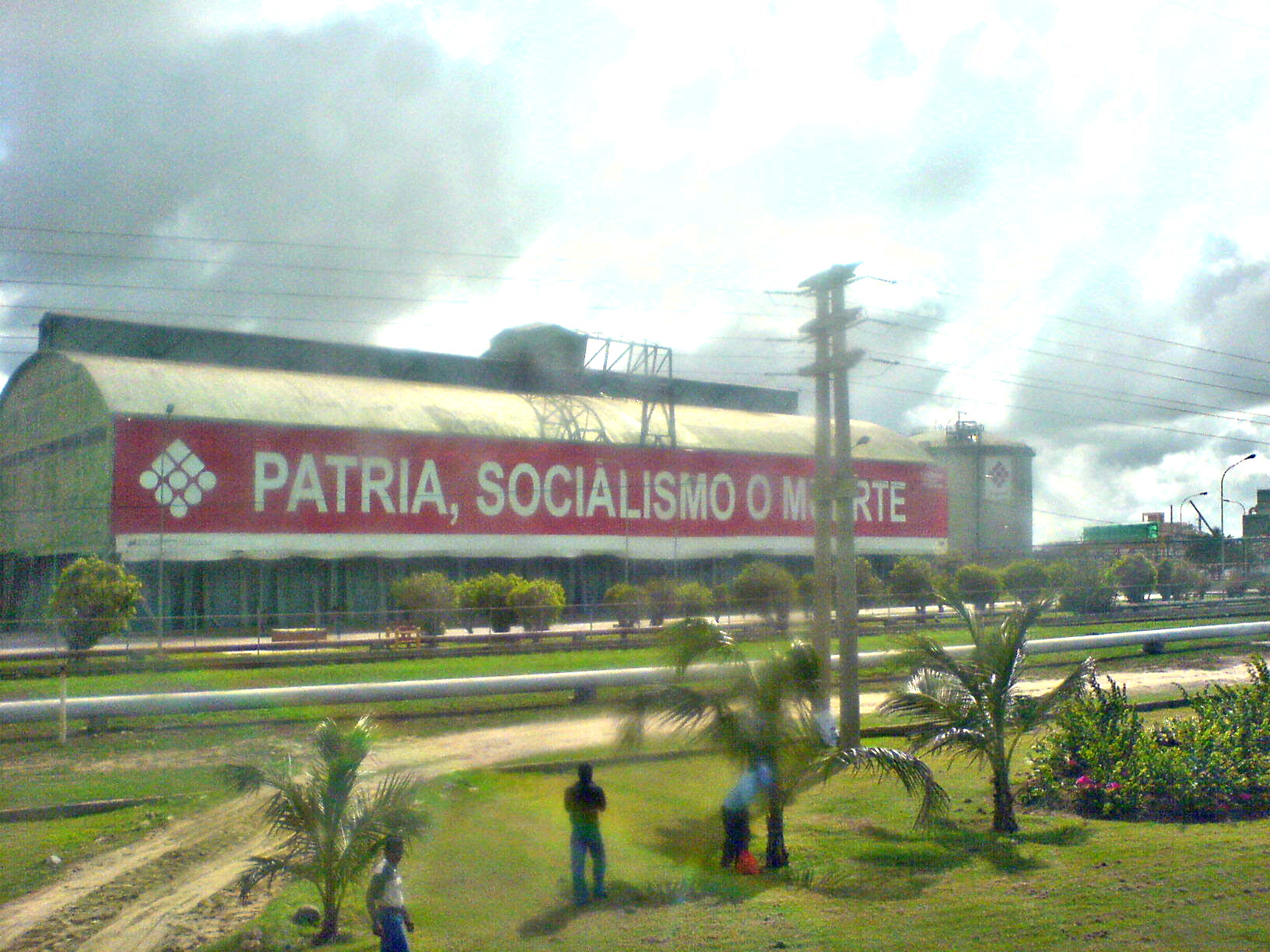
The slogan "Fatherland, socialism or death" on the side of a PDVSA facility.

The Venezuelan state media "regularly broadcasts government-sponsored activities" and "[p]romotional campaigns for Chavez's social missions" in order "to underscore the diversity of its supporters". Many Venezuelan's viewed Chávez's Aló Presidente program since it was known for unveiling new financial assistance packages every weekend to viewers. Chávez repeatedly expressed successes on television which resulted in a large popular base of support.

In 2013, the Venezuelan government created the Joint Chiefs of Communications with the objective to respond to keep "the people informed of everything that the Bolivarian Revolution is doing for the well-being of everyone".

== See also ==
- Bolivarian Army of Trolls
- Bolivarianism
- Censorship in Venezuela
- Economy of Venezuela
- The Revolution Will Not Be Televised
