= John Schmitt (economist) =

American economist

- Born: May 6, 1962 (age 62)
- Education: Princeton University (BA); London School of Economics (MS, PhD)

John Schmitt (born May 6, 1962) is an American economist, who serves as a senior economist with the Center for Economic and Policy Research in Washington, DC. He has written extensively on economic inequality, unemployment, the new economy, the welfare state, and other topics for both academic and popular audiences. He has also worked as a consultant for national and international organizations including the American Center for International Labor Solidarity, the Global Policy Network, the International Labour Organization, the United Nations Economic Commission for Latin America, and others.

Schmitt's research has focused primarily on inequality in the US labor market and the role of labor-market institutions in explaining international differences in economic performance, particularly between the United States and Europe. Schmitt has co-authored (with Lawrence Mishel and Jared Bernstein) three editions of The State of Working America(Cornell University Press). He has also contributed to The American Prospect, The Boston Review, Challenge, The Guardian, The International Herald Tribune, The Washington Post, and other newspapers and magazines.

He is also a visiting lecturer at the Pompeu Fabra University (Barcelona) and has been an academic visitor at the Universidad Centroamericana "Jose Simeon Cañas" (San Salvador, El Salvador). He has an undergraduate degree from the Woodrow Wilson School of Public and International Affairs at Princeton University and an M.Sc. and Ph.D. in economics from the London School of Economics.
