= Center for Economic and Policy Research =

Left-leaning American think tank

- Abbreviation: CEPR
- Formation: 1999; 27 years ago
- Type: Economic policy think tank
- Headquarters: 1611 Connecticut Avenue NW; Washington, D.C., United States
- Co-directors: Dean Baker; Mark Weisbrot
- Revenue: $3.26 million (2024)
- Expenses: $6.13 million (2024)
- Website: www.cepr.net

The Center for Economic and Policy Research (CEPR) is an American think tank that specializes in economic policy. Based in Washington, D.C. CEPR was co-founded by economists Dean Baker and Mark Weisbrot in 1999.

Considered a left-leaning organization, notable CEPR contributors include Nobel Memorial Prize in Economic Sciences recipients Joseph Stiglitz and Robert Solow.

== History ==
Politically, CEPR has been described as both progressive and left-leaning.

== Issues ==
=== United States ===
==== Healthcare ====
CEPR supports the Affordable Care Act (ACA) stating that it is "a family-friendly policy" and that the policy "has allowed thousands of workers to voluntarily reduce their work hours to care for children or elderly parents, or to explore new opportunities." Despite the increase in the percentage of workers employed on a part-time basis, CEPR concluded that such statistics were not sufficient to make any overall judgments on the health of the labor market.

==== Employment ====
CEPR backs alongside the Economic Policy Institute (EPI) the Full Employment Caucus, a group on United States House officials that advocate for full employment in the United States.

==== Minimum wage ====
A 2014 study by CEPR shows that 13 states that increased their minimum wage had an average payroll of 0.99% compared to 0.68% in other states, though the CEPR stated the analysis was "far from scientific". In response to criticism of President Joe Biden's support for a $15 minimum wage, Baker calculated that, had wages risen alongside increases in productivity since 1968, the minimum wage would be around $24 an hour. This was later revised to $21.50 per hour on March 16, 2022, after a spreadsheet error was found and corrected.

==== Taxes ====
In a 2014 report in Fortune, CEPR co-founder Dean Baker suggested that according to poll findings, many citizens of the United States did not notice a 2% increase in their Social Security tax.

=== Latin America ===
CEPR has been supportive of left-leaning governments in South America.

==== Brazil ====
In 2008, Brazilian Foreign Secretary Celso Amorim cited CEPR's work to explain why Brazil had no interest in signing a free trade agreement with the United States. He said that the CEPR report concluded that the most severe impacts from the 2008 financial crisis would be suffered by those economies most integrated to United States, those that have free trade agreements with the US.

==== Venezuela ====
CEPR and its founder Mark Weisbrot have analysed and often written about the crisis in Venezuela. In an October 2012 op-ed for The New York Times, Weisbrot wrote "[a]lthough some media have talked of Venezuela’s impending economic collapse for more than a decade, it hasn’t happened and is not likely to happen." In a July 2014 article, for Fortune, Weisbrot said the Venezuelan economy had performed well for the period from 2004, when the government gained control of the oil industry from the opposition, to 2012. He stated that, during the past two years, however a number of problems like the inflation and a shortage of essential consumer goods worsened. He said many problems are connected to the exchange rate system and for the things to get better, the government would have to bring inflation down and manage the transition to a new exchange rate regime. In a June 2016 article in The New York Times, Weisbrot wrote that "Washington has caused enormous damage to Venezuela in its relentless pursuit of 'regime change' for the last 15 years." He suggested the US end its intervention, which he said included economic sanctions, funding of opposition groups and refusal to accept presidential election results.

==== Bolivia ====
in 2019, CEPR criticized the Organization of American States (OAS)'s audit of the 2019 Bolivian general election, which concluded that the results of the elections should be voided because there were "drastic and hard-to-explain change in the trend of the preliminary results after the closing of the polls". Weisbrot wrote that the report "provides absolutely no evidence — no statistics, numbers, or facts of any kind — to support this idea", and called on the OAS to retract its press release.

CEPR commissioned researchers at the MIT Election Data and Science Lab, John Curiel and Jack R. Williams, to independently verify their work on the 2019 Bolivian election. The MIT researchers published a statistical analysis on 27 February 2020, confirming the results of the CEPR study and finding that there was no "statistical evidence of fraud that we can find — the trends in the preliminary count, the lack of any big jump in support for Morales after the halt, and the size of Morales’s margin all appear legitimate. All in all, the OAS's statistical analysis and conclusions would appear deeply flawed" and that "it is highly likely that Morales surpassed the 10-percentage-point margin in the first round" as originally presented. Several left-leaning governments like Argentina under Alberto Fernandez cited the CEPR report as a reason to support the old Bolivian president Morales, while right-leaning governments like Brazil under Jair Bolsonaro backed the OAS. The OAS dismissed the report as "neither honest, nor fact-based nor comprehensive" and called it "unscientific". Three researchers from the University of Pennsylvania further criticised the OAS report in a study and according to the New York Times the OAS consultant refused to share the data or methods of the OAS analysis, while an expert from the University of Miami like the OAS stated there was fraud in the election. Two economists from the Mercatus Center and the College of Business and Entrepreneurship, writing for Project Syndicate, argued that the assumptions of the study of the MIT scientists commissioned by CEPR, were questionable for methodological reasons.

== Personnel ==
CEPR's staff includes Ha-Joon Chang, Eileen Appelbaum, John Schmitt and Deborah James.

CEPR contributors include Advisory Board Members Joseph Stiglitz and Robert Solow.

As of 2017, CEPR's Board of Directors includes:

- Dean Baker
- Walden Bello
- Chuck Collins
- Teresa Ghilarducci
- Danny Glover
- Robert Pollin

Julian Bond served as CEPR's Board Chair in the past.
