= Deborah James (activist) =

American activist(born 1971)

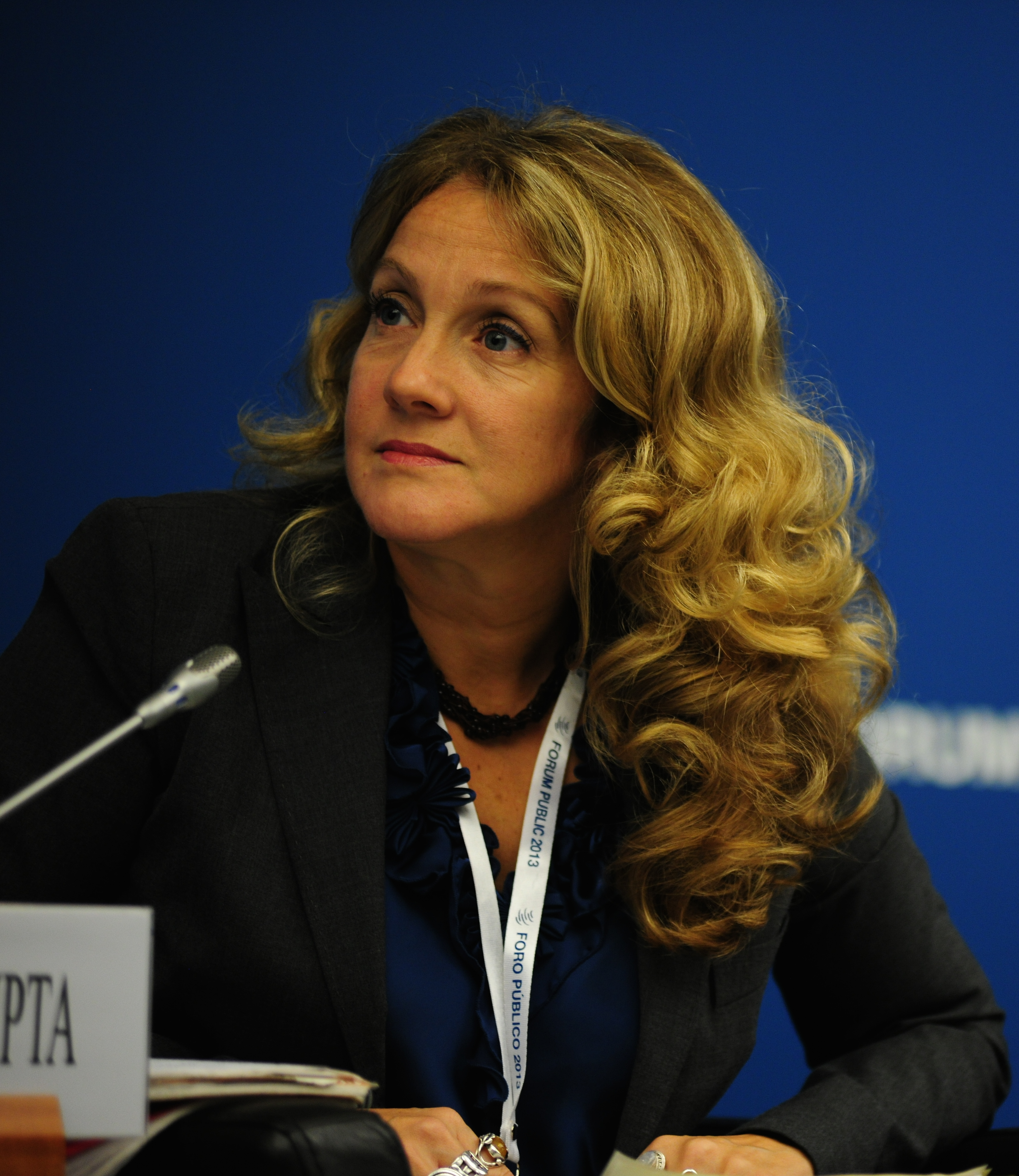
- James at the World Trade Organization's 2013 Public Forum.
- Born: March 13, 1971 (age 55); Fort Sill, Oklahoma
- Education: University of California at San Diego; George Washington University
- Organization: Center for Economic and Policy Research
- Board member of: Global Exchange

Deborah James (born March 13, 1971) is an American activist. She is director of international programs at the Center for Economic and Policy Research (CEPR) and is on the Board of Directors of Global Exchange. Prior to her work for CEPR, James had been called "a top U.S. protest organizer" by the Center for Public Integrity. She was formerly the Director of the WTO Program at Public Citizen's Global Trade Watch, the Global Economy Director at Global Exchange, and the Executive Director of the Venezuela Information Office.

== Career ==
=== Global Exchange ===
In 1993, James became the Global Economy Director for Global Exchange. During her 12-year stay, she advocated for the Free Trade Area of the Americas (FTAA). The FTAA proposed a free trade zone for the Americas, the proposal however failed. Since then, has continued to contribute by serving the organization by being on the Board of Directors of Global Exchange.

==== Anti-globalization and opposition to WTO ====
During her time at Global Exchange, James opposed the expansion of NAFTA during the 1990s. James also contributed to the opposition of the expansion of the World Trade Organization at the World Trade Organization Ministerial Conference of 1999 where Global Exchanged help organize the 1999 Seattle WTO protests, at the 2003 WTO meeting in Cancun and the 2005 WTO meeting in Hong Kong. The subject maintains the goals of the WTO for employment and prosperity have not been met.

==== Workers advocacy ====
During the fall of 1999, James led a campaign called the "Roast Starbucks Campaign" with Global Exchange to persuade Starbucks to use Fair trade coffee in every one of their stores. In an interview, James explained how the Global Exchange campaign included several demonstrations in cities and mailed in letters to Starbucks demanding the use of Fair trade coffee, all organized by Global Exchange. In the spring of 2000, Global Exchange halted its campaign after Starbucks signed an agreement with TransFairUS to offer Fair trade coffee. James also persuaded Procter & Gamble to use Fair Trade Certified coffee as well.

James also advocated for a living wage and suitable working conditions for workers of Nike, Inc. and Gap Inc. She also promoted the usage of Fair Trade chocolate in order to combat child slavery in the Ivory Coast.

==== Venezuela ====
In 2006, James wrote a publication for Global Exchange titled U.S. Intervention in Venezuela: A Clear and Present Danger, where she said the United States "undermines" Venezuela's democracy and social progress while also calling on United States citizens to counter this alleged "undermining". The Marxist magazine Political Affairs called James a "Venezuela expert" and that U.S. Intervention in Venezuela: A Clear and Present Danger "tells a shocking tale of US intervention in Venezuela’s democratic process, examines a series of myths about Venezuela, and offers an explanation of the real concerns underlying the Bush administration’s antagonism towards Venezuela" and how the publication "offers US citizens some concrete ways we can get involved". In the publication, James used some of work from Eva Golinger's Chávez Code.

=== Venezuelan Information Office (VIO) ===
In 2004, James, with a starting salary of about $64,000 per year, became the Executive Director of the Venezuela Information Office (VIO), a lobbying agency in the United States run by the Venezuelan government that had a goal of improving the view of the Venezuelan government in the United States and had a stated mission "to prevent US intervention in Venezuela". While James was Executive Director of the Venezuelan Information Office, she would organize solidarity groups, activists and protesters to support the image of the Venezuelan government and its policies while also lobbying for the Venezuelan government in the United States Congress.

=== Center for Economic and Policy Research (CEPR) ===
Following her time at the Venezuela Information Office, James moved to the Center for Economic and Policy Research (CEPR) where she is currently the Director of International Programs. James' contributions at the CEPR focus on the International Monetary Fund, the World Trade Organization, and U.S. policy towards Latin America.
