= South of the Border (2009 film) =

- Theatrical release poster
- Directed by: Oliver Stone
- Written by: Tariq Ali; Mark Weisbrot
- Produced by: Fernando Sulichin; Jose Ibanez; Rob Wilson
- Starring: Hugo Chávez; Evo Morales; Cristina Kirchner; Néstor Kirchner; Rafael Correa; Raúl Castro; Fernando Lugo; Lula da Silva; Tariq Ali
- Narrated by: Oliver Stone
- Cinematography: Carlos Marcovich; Albert Maysles; Lucas Fuica
- Edited by: Alexis Chavez; Elisa Bonora
- Music by: Adam Peters
- Production companies: Good Apple Productions; Ixtlan; Muse Productions; New Element Productions; Pentagrama Films
- Distributed by: Cinema Libre
- Release date: September 2009
- Running time: 78 minutes
- Country: United States
- Language: English

South of the Border is a 2009 American documentary film directed by Oliver Stone. The documentary premiered at the 2009 Venice Film Festival. Writer for the project Tariq Ali calls the documentary "a political road movie".

The film has Stone and his crew travel from the Caribbean down the spine of the Andes in an attempt to explain the "phenomenon" of Venezuelan president Hugo Chávez, and account for the continent's "pink tide" leftward tilt. A key feature is also Venezuela's recent Bolivarian revolution and Latin America's political progress in the 21st century. Stone stated that he hopes the film will help people better understand a leader who is wrongly ridiculed "as a strongman, as a buffoon, as a clown."

In addition to Chávez, Stone sought to flesh out several other Latin American presidents whose policies and personalities generally get limited, or according to Stone, biased media attention in the United States and Europe, notably: Evo Morales of Bolivia; Cristina Kirchner and former president Néstor Kirchner of Argentina; Rafael Correa of Ecuador; Raúl Castro of Cuba; Fernando Lugo of Paraguay; and Lula da Silva of Brazil.

== Content ==
The documentary examines the free-market economic policies of the U.S. and the International Monetary Fund, and how they have largely failed to alleviate Latin America's chronic income inequality. The film suggests that financial calamities such as the Argentine peso collapse of 2001, combined with Latin suspicions of U.S. drug-eradication efforts and resentment over the selling off of natural resources through multinational companies, have contributed to the rise of socialist and social-democratic leaders across the region.

According to the Associated Press, "Stone said he didn't see it necessary to present the opposition's case in his film."

== Production ==
We were not writing a book, or having an academic debate. It was to have a sympathetic view of these governments.

— Tariq Ali, South of the Border writer

Oliver Stone spoke of his move to balance the media reactions to other pink tide leaders in the region: "... the project started as something about the American media demonizing Latin leaders. It became more than that as we got more involved. The press in America, I think you're aware, has divided the Latin continent into the 'bad Left' and the 'good Left'."

US economist Mark Weisbrot advised Stone on the documentary and was credited as one of the writers alongside Tariq Ali.

In May 2010, Stone began a Latin American tour to promote the film, with screenings planned in Ecuador, Brazil, Bolivia, Paraguay and Argentina. The documentary was also being released in some cities in the United States and Europe later in 2010.

The Box Office Mojo site reports that as of August 2010 the film had grossed $198,600 domestically.

The documentary was released in the U.K. at the end of July 2010 by Dogwoof film distributors.

== Reception ==
South of the Border received mixed reviews, and has as a score of 45 out of 100 on Metacritic, based on 19 film reviews collected.

=== United States ===
The Hollywood Reporter wrote that the film is "a rebuttal of what [Stone] views as the fulminations and lies of right-wing media at home and abroad regarding the socialist democracies of South America".

Time magazine described the film as a "slapdash effort", "amateur night as cinema, as lopsided and cheerleadery as its worldview".

He raises no tough issues, some of which are summarized in Amnesty International's 2009 report on Venezuela: "Attacks on journalists were widespread. Human-rights defenders continued to suffer harassment. Prison conditions provoked hunger strikes in facilities across the country."

Variety said, "The docu (sic) offers little genuine information and no investigative research, adopting a style even more polemical than Stone’s earlier focus on Fidel Castro and Yasser Arafat." Reuters said Stone "deliver[ed] a strong endorsement of Chavez's socialist agenda, and question[ed] the tenets of what he calls U.S. 'predatory capitalism,'"

Bloomberg's journalist, Fabiola Moura described the film as "rosy in its picture", while being "a tonic dose of a perspective rarely seen in U.S. media coverage of the region", and commented:

The movie doesn’t mention Chavez’s blacklisting of millions of people who signed a petition seeking a recall vote against him in 2004; the persecution of political rivals; the creation of a new "Capital District" to usurp power from the opposition-led Caracas city government; and the refusal to renew the broadcasting license of Radio Caracas Television, the country’s oldest station.

NPR says the film tells only one side of the story and gives "kid glove treatment" to Chavez and his allies.

The Chicago Sun-Times gave the film a favourable review. The reviewer stated, in regards to the film's criticism that "those criticisms ironically validate another theme of the documentary: the media's often biased coverage of Latin American politics."

Foreign Policy magazine said Stone asked softball questions of the South American leaders and

More troubling is how South of the Border masquerades as journalism... The film leaves the viewer flush with platitudes about the leader's Bolivarian Revolution, but with a head full of unanswered questions about how it actually works..... But Stone seems content to take virtually everything he sees at face value.... In the end, the film tell us less about Latin America than it does about Oliver Stone, and his career-long quest to expose Washington's supposedly implacable hegemonic designs.

Larry Rohter wrote in The New York Times accusing the film of "misinformation." On June 28, 2010, Oliver Stone responded to Rohter by rejecting the reporter's criticisms, saying they were not founded in fact, and criticizing the Times for its editorial board’s endorsement of the military coup of April 11, 2002 against the elected government of Venezuela, which he argued was "embarrassing" to the newspaper. Stone said that Rohter had written an article on April 12, 2002 which strongly endorsed the coup in Venezuela and other anti-Chavez articles previously. Stone's rebuttal concludes with the statement: "It is not surprising that someone [Rohter] who supports the military overthrow of a democratically elected government would not like a documentary like this one, which celebrates the triumphs of electoral democracy in South America over the last decade." Mark Weisbrot added that "he [Rohter] failed to find any factual errors in the film – despite some rather desperate attempts." Rohter replied and reiterated that a number of economical and historical facts were either omitted or changed by the filmmakers in Chavez's favor. He called the accusations levied against him by the film's creators a "smokescreen" and a "smear campaign". The film's creators claimed similar treatment from Rohter.

Ronald Radosh criticized the film in the Wall Street Journal.

Mark Weisbrot, who worked on the movie, wrote: "It's nice when you make a documentary about how the major media outlets misrepresent reality, and the media response to the film proves your point. In fact, the media's response to Oliver Stone's South of the Border, which I wrote with Tariq Ali, really completes a number of the film's arguments."

Tariq Ali, who also worked on the movie added: “It’s hardly a secret that we support the other side. It’s an opinionated documentary”...“the aim of our film is very clear and basic.” In “South of the Border,” he added: “We were not writing a book, or having an academic debate. It was to have a sympathetic view of these governments.”

=== United Kingdom ===
The documentary received mixed reviews from the mainstream press. Steve Rose wrote in The Guardian that it was "unashamedly partisan and unintentionally hilarious – both of which make it highly watchable." Rose praises Stone for correcting the partisan view of the US media, but criticises Stone's interview approach, saying: "Full credit to the director for correcting the view perpetrated by the US media: that the continent's new leftist presidents, particularly Venezuela's Hugo Chávez and Bolivia's Evo Morales, are 'dictators' bent on America's destruction, rather than democratically elected leaders ..." And that "Stone goes on to shoot himself in the foot with a series of clumsy, sycophantic interviews. He thinks he's being Walter Cronkite but he's more Alan Partridge." The film received a rating of one star out of five from The Independent reviewer who said "it becomes clear that Stone is ill-equipped to conduct a serious political analysis of the continent. He gets amazing access to national leaders and yet, face to face with them, he doesn't even look interested in what they have to say."

=== Latin America ===
In Venezuela, the film grossed US$18,601 on 20 screens after 12 days. The film was criticised by Leopoldo López, an opposition leader, for ignoring and not mentioning a number of very serious problems in Venezuela such as escalating crime, inflation, food scarcity, housing, and access to water and electricity which has worsened under Chavez's rule. He disagrees with Stone's argument that "most peoples' lives in this country have improved under Chavez". Stone responded that presenting the second party opposition's case in the documentary was not his main goal. He also said that: "People forget that he cut the poverty rate by one half...People in Venezuela are getting an education, they are getting health care and welfare. [Chavez] actually delivered on what he said he would."

=== Other ===
Tariq Ali who collaborated with Stone to make the film remarked that: "These changes that are taking place are not coming about through armed struggle or guerrilla warfare or Che Guevara. All these changes have come about through democratic elections."

== See also ==
- The Revolution Will Not Be Televised (film)
- The War on Democracy, documentary by John Pilger
- X-Ray of a Lie
