= Plan Ávila =

Venezuelan military contingency plan

Plan Ávila is a military contingency plan by the Venezuelan Army to maintain public order in the Venezuelan capital, Caracas. The plan was first implemented in 1989 by the Carlos Andrés Pérez government in response to the Caracazo riots, where hundreds were killed by military and armed police. President Hugo Chávez also ordered activation of the plan in response to the 11 April 2002 Llaguno Overpass events, but high-ranking members of the Armed Forces refused to carry out the plan, wanting to avoid a massacre like the Caracazo.

== History ==
=== Origin ===
Plan Ávila was created in the 1960s as a contingency plan if guerrilla forces were to overcome police and the national guard, requiring the Army of Venezuela to intervene. The plan was organized to have a lax structure, removing chains of command and grouping army troops into independent squads to combat potentially small, unorganized guerrilla groups.

=== Caracazo ===
Plan Ávila was first implemented in 1989 by the government of Carlos Andrés Pérez, in response to riots, in an event which became known as the Caracazo; resulting with hundreds to thousands being killed by military and armed police.

On 27 August 2002, the Inter-American Court of Human Rights found that the 1989 implementation of Plan Ávila had resulted in massive human rights violations, and ordered the Venezuelan government to review its military contingency planning to conform to international human rights standards. In 2009, Venezuelan attorney general Luisa Ortega Díaz ordered the extradition of Pérez due to his implementation of the plan.

=== 2002 Venezuelan coup attempt ===
The activation of Plan Ávila was ordered by then-President Hugo Chávez at midday on 11 April 2002, in response to the Llaguno Overpass events. The action was in violation of laws in the 1999 Venezuela Constitution created by Chávez that were in place to prevent another massacre like the Caracazo. High-ranking members of the Armed Forces refused to carry out the Plan. When the General responsible was nowhere to be found, another general, Jorge García Carneiro, the head of the largest military unit in Caracas, offered to step in. However, this was thwarted by soldiers blocking a highway and diverting civilian traffic into the military base at Fuerte Tiuna, preventing its troops from leaving. On contacting the base, the general was also told that a group of generals had plans to arrest the President. General in Chief Lucas Rincón and National Assembly President William Lara said that Chávez's order was not to repress the population but to maintain public order while Deputy Calixto Ortega of the fact-finding Mixed Commission surrounding the coup attempt said the plan had already been safely applied during the visit of Pope John Paul II to Venezuela.

=== Plan Zamora ===
During the 2017 protests, over 2,000 security checkpoints were ordered by President Maduro on 15 April 2017, which would be established throughout Venezuela prior to the 19 April "mega march", with nearly 200,000 Venezuelan authorities said to be participating. Finally on 18 April, President Maduro "green-lighted" Plan Zamora, a plan compared to the heavily criticized Plan Ávila, and was described by officials as "a joint strategic plan to respond to possible adverse events or foreign intervention that endangers the country's security". Antonio Benavides, commander of the Bolivarian National Guard, stated that the plan involved "the incorporation of the people to exercise the transition from normal social activity to the state of internal or external commotion", granting Bolivarian civilians the power to act as shock troops. The plan also granted the State the power to arrest protesters under martial law and have civilians face military tribunals, which was heavily criticized by human rights groups. Civilians accused of attacking military authorities would be charged with "rebellion" and could be summarily tried in military courts.
