= The Revolution Will Not Be Televised (film) =

2003 documentary about Venezuelan coup

- Theatrical release poster
- Directed by: Kim Bartley; Donnacha Ó Briain
- Produced by: David Power
- Starring: Hugo Chávez; Pedro Carmona; Jesse Helms; Colin Powell; George Tenet
- Narrated by: Donnacha Ó Briain
- Cinematography: Kim Bartley; Donnacha Ó Briain
- Edited by: Ángel Hernández Zoido
- Production company: Power Pictures
- Distributed by: Vitagraph Films (US)
- Release date: 2003
- Running time: Chavez: Inside the Coup; 52 minutes The Revolution Will Not Be Televised; 74 minutes
- Country: Ireland
- Languages: English; Spanish
- Budget: €200,000
- Box office: $200,000 (€171,000) (Note: Exchange rates are based on the Oanda Corporation's historical records of average interbank lending rates from the period.)

The Revolution Will Not Be Televised (Spanish: La revolución no será transmitida), also known as Chávez: Inside the Coup, is a 2003 Irish documentary film. It focuses on events in Venezuela leading up to and during the April 2002 coup d'état attempt, which saw President Hugo Chávez removed from office for two days. With particular emphasis on the role played by Venezuela's private media, the film examines several key incidents: the protest march and subsequent violence that provided the impetus for Chávez's ousting; the opposition's formation of an interim government headed by business leader Pedro Carmona; and the Carmona administration's collapse, which paved the way for Chávez's return. The Revolution Will Not Be Televised was directed by Irish filmmakers Kim Bartley and Donnacha Ó Briain. Given direct access to Chávez, the filmmakers intended to make a fly-on-the-wall biography of the president. They spent seven months filming in Venezuela, following Chávez and his staff and interviewing ordinary citizens. As the coup unfolded on 11 April, Bartley and Ó Briain filmed on the streets of the capital, Caracas, capturing footage of protesters and the erupting violence. Later, they filmed many of the political upheavals inside Miraflores, the presidential palace.

Bartley and Ó Briain conceived of the film after Bartley returned from documenting the aftermath of the 1999 Vargas mudslides for an Irish charity. Following a visit to Venezuela to determine the feasibility of a film project, the pair formed a production company and applied to Ireland's film board, Bord Scannán na hÉireann (BSÉ), for a development grant. At BSÉ's request, the filmmakers partnered with a more experienced producer and shot a short pilot to show to potential investors. Funding for the €200,000 production was provided by BSÉ and several European broadcasters. Bartley and Ó Briain shot more than 200 hours of material; editing focused on identifying footage that would make the film entertaining and drive the plot. It was at this stage that the film's coverage narrowed to concentrate more on the coup attempt.

The film was positively received by mainstream film critics and won several awards. Reviewers cited the filmmakers' unprecedented proximity to key events and praised the film for its "riveting narrative"; criticism focused on its lack of context and pro-Chávez bias. First shown on television in Europe and Venezuela in 2003, The Revolution Will Not Be Televised later appeared at film festivals and secured a limited theatrical release on the art house circuit. Independent activists held unofficial screenings, and Venezuelan government officials encouraged its circulation to build support for Chávez's administration. The film is regularly shown on Venezuelan television, and in the capital it is often broadcast during "contentious political conjunctures". The Revolution Will Not Be Televised paints Chávez in a favorable light, which has led to disputes over its neutrality and accuracy; particular attention is paid to its framing of the violence of 11–13 April, the filmmakers' editing of the timeline, and the omission of incidents and personnel. The film is variously cited as an accurate portrayal or a misrepresentation of the events of April 2002.

== Background ==
Throughout much of the twentieth century, Venezuela was beset by political, civil and military unrest. After Juan Vicente Gómez's long reign as president ended in 1935, a series of military rulers followed, concluding with Marcos Pérez Jiménez's overthrow by general uprising in 1958. Although the military remained influential, Venezuela's government has since been chosen by civilians through democratic processes. Until 1998, the dominant political parties were Acción Democrática and COPEI, who shared seven presidencies between them. In 1989, during the second term in office for Acción Democrática's Carlos Andrés Pérez, Venezuela was hit by a severe economic crisis. A wave of protests known as the Caracazo engulfed the country and dozens were killed in rioting.

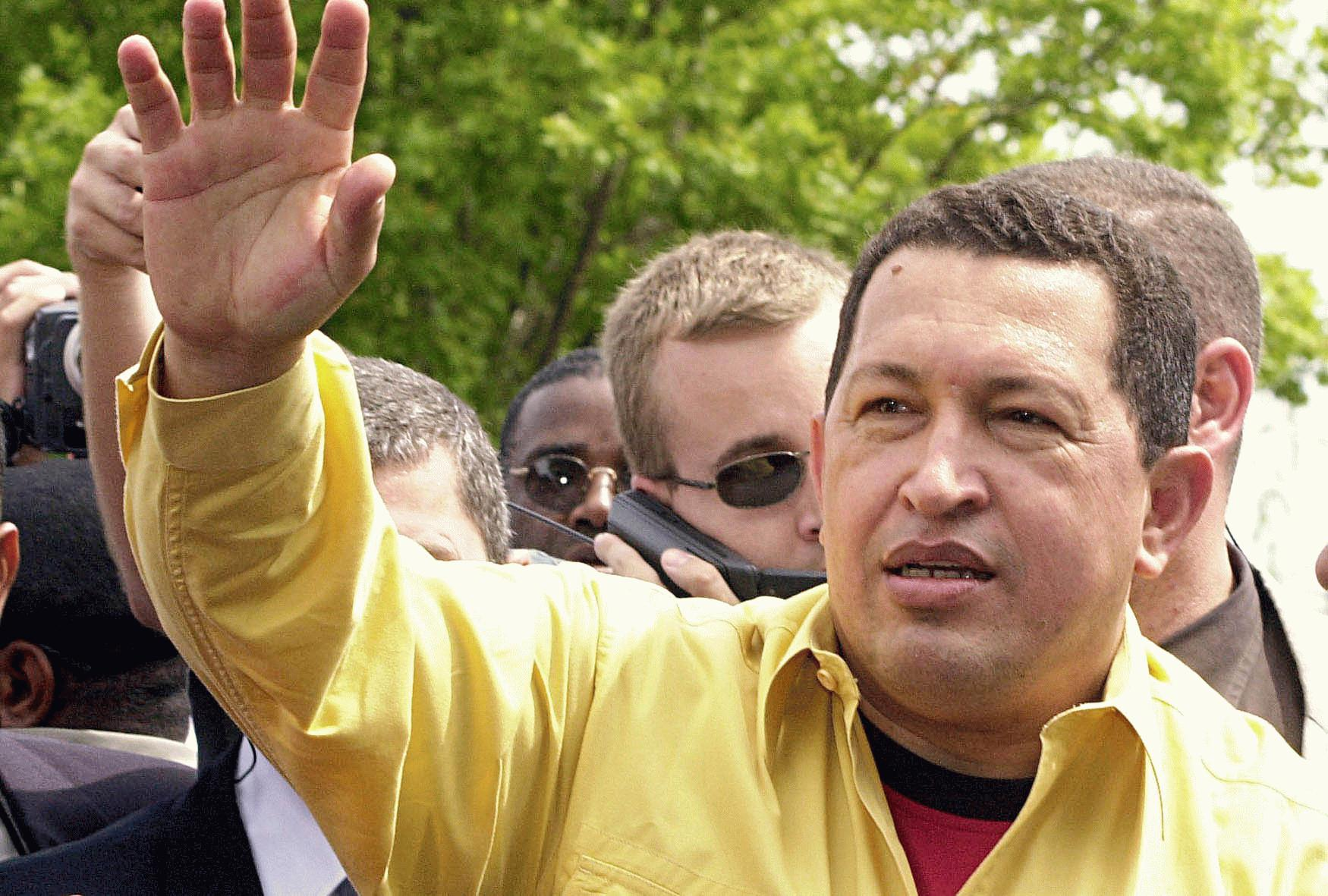
Hugo Chávez in 2003

Hugo Chávez, then a Lieutenant Colonel in the army, had formed a secret revolutionary group (MBR-200) in the early 1980s and was planning a "rebellious intervention". He later felt the Caracazo was a missed opportunity for his movement. Three years later, Chávez saw another chance; in February 1992, he led an unsuccessful military coup d'état and was imprisoned. A second coup attempt, without his involvement, also failed. Chávez enjoyed some popular support for his actions. Released from prison in 1994, he recast his revolutionary group as a legitimate socialist political party, the Fifth Republic Movement. The movement adopted former Venezuelan leader Simón Bolívar as its "iconic hero" and "reference point"; Bolívar had played a key role in Latin America's successful struggle for independence from Spain in the 1820s. In the 1998 presidential election, Chávez won 56.2% of the vote, on a promise to "end the corruption of several decades" and institute a new Bolivarian Revolution that he felt would secure Latin America's true independence from the outside world.

Chávez strengthened his support among the poor with a series of social initiatives known as the Bolivarian Missions, and created a network of grass-roots workers' councils, the Bolivarian Circles. Nevertheless, by early 2002, Venezuela was "embroiled ... in a severe political crisis" as Chávez sought to bring more of the country's vast oil wealth under state control. Although the state-owned radio and television stations remained staunch advocates of Chávez's stated policies—to redistribute the nation's wealth to the poorest—the private media was more hostile. (Note: According to Phil Gunson in Columbia Journalism Review, in Venezuela, "It is hard, if not impossible, to find an impartial observer. Most of the country's private news media have openly joined the opposition. State radio and TV are crude cheerleaders for the government.") The crisis reached a head when Chávez attempted to remove the management of the state oil company, Petróleos de Venezuela (PDVSA), provoking a showdown. "Oil managers, business leaders, and large segments of organized labor" called a general strike. The strike was backed by a large segment of the population, "particularly the country's increasingly impoverished middle class" and army officers upset at the increasing politicization of the military.

On 11 April 2002, hundreds of thousands of people marched in protest against the government. Abandoning their planned route, the marchers advanced towards the palace, a path that took them close to government supporters who had come out in opposition to the protest. Journalist Phil Gunson wrote, "Shooting broke out on all sides. A score of civilians died and more than 150 suffered gunshot wounds. The military high command called for Chávez to resign, and at 3:20 the next morning they announced he had agreed to do so. The presidency was assumed by a business leader, Pedro Carmona Estanga, but his government collapsed in less than forty-eight hours and Chávez returned to power."

== Synopsis ==
The Revolution Will Not Be Televised opens in 2001 (Note: This synopsis describes the 74-minute cut of the film,The Revolution Will Not Be Televised. The 52-minute television version, Chávez: Inside the Coup, begins differently but covers the same major incidents.) with footage of Chávez as he tours the country. Met with "popular enthusiasm", he speaks at rallies, decrying neoliberalism and the international community's attacks on his character. The film outlines Chávez's rise to power, before covering his day-to-day routine and appearances on his television show, Aló Presidente, which includes a phone-in for citizens to speak with the president. Chávez outlines his aspiration to be seen as a modern-day Bolívar. Clips from Venezuelan and United States news reports demonstrate a "relentless campaign" against the president.

Interviews with communities from both sides of the political divide indicate how Chávez is seen by the rich and poor. The latter support his stated aim to redistribute the country's oil wealth; the former fear totalitarianism and are worried Chávez will institute communism. In February 2002, the media war intensifies after Chavez takes control of PDVSA. The film states that the company was previously run as a private interest for the benefit of a minority, despite being state-owned. Business leader Pedro Carmona and union boss Carlos Ortega are the main voices of the opposition. After the pair visit Washington, D.C., the CIA and the State Department express concern about Chávez's rule and stress the importance of Venezuela's oil. A Venezuelan general appears on private television to voice similar disquiet. Carmona appeals for a public protest at the offices of PDVSA.

On 11 April, opposition protesters begin their march outside PDVSA's headquarters in Caracas; Chávez's supporters gather outside the presidential palace. The protest route is changed to take it to the palace; shots ring out and civilians are killed. The private media blames Chávez's supporters, citing footage that shows them shooting at opposition protesters from a bridge. The narration states, "What the TV stations didn't broadcast was [this camera angle], which clearly shows that the streets below were empty. The opposition march had never taken that route." Later, the state television signal is cut; rumors circulate that the opposition has taken over the studio. At the palace, members of the military high command demand Chávez's resignation, threatening to bomb the building. The president refuses to resign, but submits to their custody. He is led away, and Carmona announces on television that a transitional government will be established.

On 12 April, opposition leaders appear on private television, where they disclose their plan to unseat Chávez. Carmona is sworn in as president while images play of unrest on the streets. Defying media censorship, Chávez's supporters disseminate the story that the president did not resign. On 13 April, they gather to protest outside Miraflores, while palace guards plot to retake the building. The guards take up key positions and, at a prearranged signal, take members of the new government prisoner. The state television channel is relaunched and urges the army to back Chávez. "Full military control" is returned to the Chávez administration and the president arrives at the palace amid celebratory scenes. Chávez makes an address in which he says it is fine to oppose him, but not the Constitution of Venezuela. The closing titles say Carmona fled to Miami while under house arrest, and that Ortega went into hiding, only reappearing to help lead the opposition after Chávez said there would be no repercussions. Most of the dissident generals, after being expelled from the army, fled to the US. Others remained as part of the opposition.

== Production ==
=== Development ===
In December 1999, independent Irish filmmaker Kim Bartley visited Venezuela as part of Concern Worldwide's emergency response team, to document the aftermath of the 1999 Vargas mudslides that had devastated much of Vargas State in the north of the country. Bartley become fascinated with how those affected by the tragedy perceived Chávez, and in late 2000, she and Donnacha Ó Briain—a filmmaker and former colleague who shared her interest in "Latin American politics and issues around globalization"—spent two weeks in Caracas to determine the feasibility of a film project. The pair formed a production company, Runway Films, and in January 2001 applied to Ireland's film board, Bord Scannán na hÉireann (BSÉ), for a development grant. Bartley and Ó Briain proposed a fly-on-the-wall documentary, a "personal profile and intimate portrait" of Chávez that would be "broadly supportive" of him. During their 2000 visit, the filmmakers had sensed that "something genuinely was happening" in Caracas, and felt an urgency to get the project underway; even so, it wasn't until April 2001 that BSÉ approved the £6000 (€9500) grant.

The project was at this point named Aló Presidente, a working title taken from Chávez's weekly television and radio program. BSÉ set about exploring avenues of funding; the organization persuaded Bartley and Ó Briain to make a short pilot to show to potential investors, but refused the filmmakers' application for a €60,000 grant towards their €131,000 production budget. BSÉ felt the pair needed to partner with a production company that had experience in the field, and which could help raise the remaining funds. Bartley and Ó Briain approached Power Pictures and, with the addition of David Power as a producer, reapplied for the grant. Even as filming began, the full budget—now at €200,000—had not been secured. David Power pitched the project at several documentary festivals and markets. At Dublin's Stranger Than Fiction festival in September 2001, the BBC, S4C and Channel 4 declined to invest. Raidió Teilifís Éireann (RTÉ) expressed interest in providing development funds; no such deal was made, but RTÉ did offer €10,000 (subsequently €20,000) for the Irish broadcast rights. In October, the Dutch broadcaster Nederlandse Programma Stichting also committed €10,000. At a November market in Amsterdam, Power once again approached the BBC and was turned down, as the organization believed the film's subject was "too far away to be relevant to [its viewers'] lives". However, RTÉ's Kevin Dawson pushed the film at a European Broadcasting Union pitching session, securing the interest of German television channel ZDF, which subsequently provided funds. In late 2001, BSÉ finally approved a production grant of €63,000.

=== Filming ===
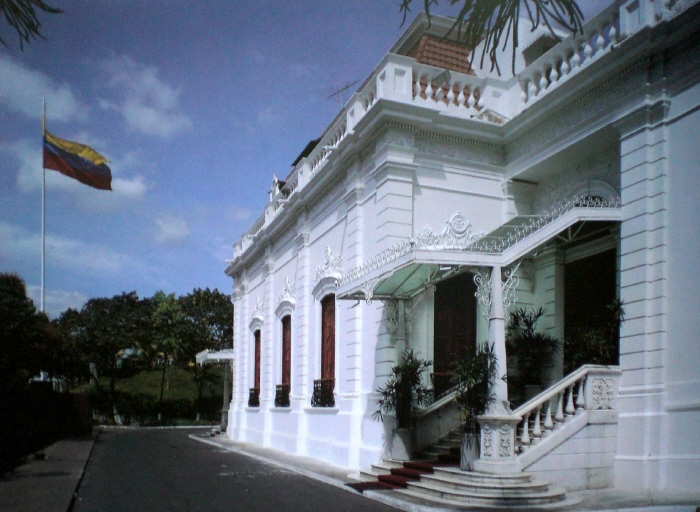
Bartley and Ó Briain captured much of their footage outside and inside the Palacio de Miraflores in Caracas.

In 2000, Bartley and Ó Briain had been promised "exclusive access" to Chávez by the government's Minister of Communications. They arrived in Venezuela in September 2001. While filming the pilot they met the president, after which they reconsidered their approach. Bartley explained, "We had ... this notion of investigating Chávez—was he a demagogue? Was the media persona just that? What makes him tick? My sense had changed as we got closer; what we're seeing here is a guy who is motivated, driven, not the demagogue with another side, drinking, carousing. I began to see him as more transparent—what you see is what you get." Bartley and Ó Briain began by attempting to build a relationship with Chávez that would allow them the access they required. At first, the president's staff treated the filmmakers with suspicion and made filming difficult. After numerous delays, Bartley and Ó Briain finally got through to Chávez. They calculated that they needed to "press the right buttons" to gain his support, so they presented him with an old edition of the memoirs of the general Daniel Florence O'Leary, who had fought alongside Simón Bolívar. Inside, they had written a quote from the Irish socialist playwright Seán O'Casey. (Note: "You cannot put a rope around the neck of an idea; you cannot put an idea up against the barrack-square wall and riddle it with bullets; you cannot confine it in the strongest prison cell your slaves could ever build.") Slowly, Bartley and Ó Briain gained their subjects' trust, "dissolving any self-consciousness as a result of their cameras".

Although ensconced with Chávez and his entourage, Bartley and Ó Briain felt a disconnect from the events of the outside world. During a "chaotic" road-trip with Chávez, they "knew something was coming", and divined that Chávez's trip was intended to bolster his support and "get people used to being on the streets". Chávez had recently "upped the ante" with the introduction of the Land Law. (Note: Introduced in November 2001 as one of 49 presidential decrees, the Land Law aimed to increase the country's food production by breaking up and redistributing unused or underused land.) Increasing tensions further, in February 2002, Chávez took control of PDVSA; the private media stepped up its criticism of Chávez, which for Bartley and Ó Briain "marked the beginning of an exciting phase". By April 2002, Bartley and Ó Briain were in Caracas and spent much of their time filming at the presidential palace, following Chávez and his staff. As the 11 April crisis unfolded, Bartley and Ó Briain filmed outside the palace, first capturing footage of the demonstrations and subsequent violence, then events inside the palace during the afternoon, evening and early hours of 12 April. Through their previous contacts at the palace, Bartley and Ó Briain were able to continue filming without interference: "no one paid any attention to us—we just blended in." Later that day, Bartley and Ó Briain stayed away from the palace through fears for their safety. Unable to leave the country—the international airport was closed—the filmmakers instead took to the streets, "to document the repression [they] were witnessing". At the same time, a press office cameraman was in the palace, "reluctant to lose his job despite the change in government". He filmed the formation of the interim government. When Bartley and Ó Briain returned to the palace on 13 April, the cameraman let them have his footage. They remained filming in Venezuela until July 2002, interviewing residents and recording "witness" accounts from those who had been present during the coup—ministers, security guards and journalists.

=== Editing ===
"While I'm editing a film, I never forget that it is entertainment ... Something that people are going to pay for to watch and thus make them think, laugh, or learn things they didn't know before. So you must never ever let them get bored. ... There are always hundreds of stories sleeping inside the material and you have to find them and wake them up. But you have to organise them in a way that they become entertainment."
—Editor Ángel Hernández Zoido

Using two digital video (DV) cameras, Bartley and Ó Briain shot over 200 hours of material on 300 DV tapes. They intended that editing take ten weeks; instead, it took six months. Rod Stoneman, BSÉ's CEO at the time, described the amount of footage compared to the film's final length as "exceptional". The 200:1 ratio was far above the norm for most documentaries, which usually have a ratio of 10:1 or 15:1. When the filmmakers returned to Ireland, they decided they needed an editor who spoke Spanish. Bartley remembered a documentary she had seen about baseball in Cuba, El juego de Cuba, so they hired its editor, Ángel Hernández Zoido. Zoido approached the film as if it were entertainment, feeling that the primary concern was to ensure the audience did not get bored. He tackled each scene the same way. After watching the rushes with Bartley and Ó Briain, Zoido asked them, "What do we want to tell in this scene?" He focused on two factors: how much information would be necessary to drive the plot, and provide an emotional core. Preferring to work alone, Zoido would then send the filmmakers from the edit suite. After Zoido completed the scene, the trio discussed whether those aims had been realized.

The large amount of footage, and the fact that the filmmakers were "in a sense ... looking at it for the first time", meant that the film's concept only became clear during editing. The events of 11–13 April gave it "a new dramatic centre", although Bartley and Ó Briain were keen that the film did not concentrate entirely on the coup. They had intended to include more historical and political context; it wasn't until late in post-production that the focus narrowed to include more emphasis on the media's role in Venezuelan politics. In October 2002, a two-hour "rough cut" was shown to Stoneman and Brendan McCarthy, BSÉ's head of Production and Development. This version included the "witness" accounts that Bartley and Ó Briain had captured after April 2002. Stoneman felt that these sequences reinforced the film's claims, but "diluted its originality". He argued that they be cut, and that to compensate, Bartley and Ó Briain should record a voice-over and place themselves more in the frame as witness-protagonists, ideas that the filmmakers initially resisted.

As editing progressed, budget shortfalls prevented BSÉ from finalizing contracts. The organization also restricted post-production funds to "limit [its] exposure" in the event the project was not completed. Stoneman contacted a former colleague at the BBC, Nick Fraser, who had declined to help finance the film in 2001. Fraser was commissioning editor for the BBC's Storyville documentaries series. According to Stoneman, Fraser was "still undecided", having been told by the head of BBC Two that "we've done Chávez". Nevertheless, the BBC pre-purchased the film and in December 2002 received a rough cut. At the BBC's behest, the opening of the television version was made more dramatic. Fraser was unsure about the voice-over; he asked for a more "opinionated" narration that, according to Bartley, would "get the boot in". Although the BBC did not ask outright, Bartley's impression was that the organization wanted the film to be "against Chávez". Fraser later said he had asked for the filmmakers to "include [an interview] with someone not a Chávez supporter". He also suggested that a more experienced director be employed to help edit the film. The filmmakers "made a few minor concessions", but resisted major edits. Ó Briain's voice-over in the final cut was "polished up but not significantly changed".

The filmmakers created two versions of the film. Chávez: Inside the Coup, intended for television broadcast, lasts 52 minutes. The feature-length The Revolution Will Not Be Televised—which takes its name from the Gil Scott-Heron song of the same name—is 74 minutes long.

== Release ==
=== Television ===
Chávez: Inside the Coup aired on RTÉ One on 18 February 2003, as an installment of the channel's True Lives documentary series. The broadcast prompted a passionate public and critical response, and "lively debate" on radio and in newspapers; RTÉ soon arranged for a repeat broadcast. In the United Kingdom, it aired on BBC Two on 16 October 2003, as part of the channel's Storyville documentary strand, and on BBC Four on 18 November 2003. Chavez: Inside the Coup also aired in Canada, Japan, Germany, France, the Netherlands, Finland and Denmark. The speed of the television broadcasts left a full theatrical run unlikely—a fact the filmmakers later regretted. (Note: Stoneman speculates that the television broadcasts may have prevented the film from being nominated for the Academy Award for Best Documentary Feature (the Academy's rules disqualify broadcast features).) The film also failed to be picked up by a television company in the US, although HBO was interested at one point. In Venezuela, La revolución no será transmitida premièred on 13 April 2003, on state television channel Venezolana de Televisión (VTV). It has since been shown regularly on Venezuelan television; the state-funded community station Catia TVe often broadcasts the film during "contentious political conjunctures", such as the 2004 recall referendum, the 2006 presidential election, and in 2007 to "help build support" for the government's controversial attempt to not renew the license of private television network RCTV.

=== Festivals and theatrical run ===
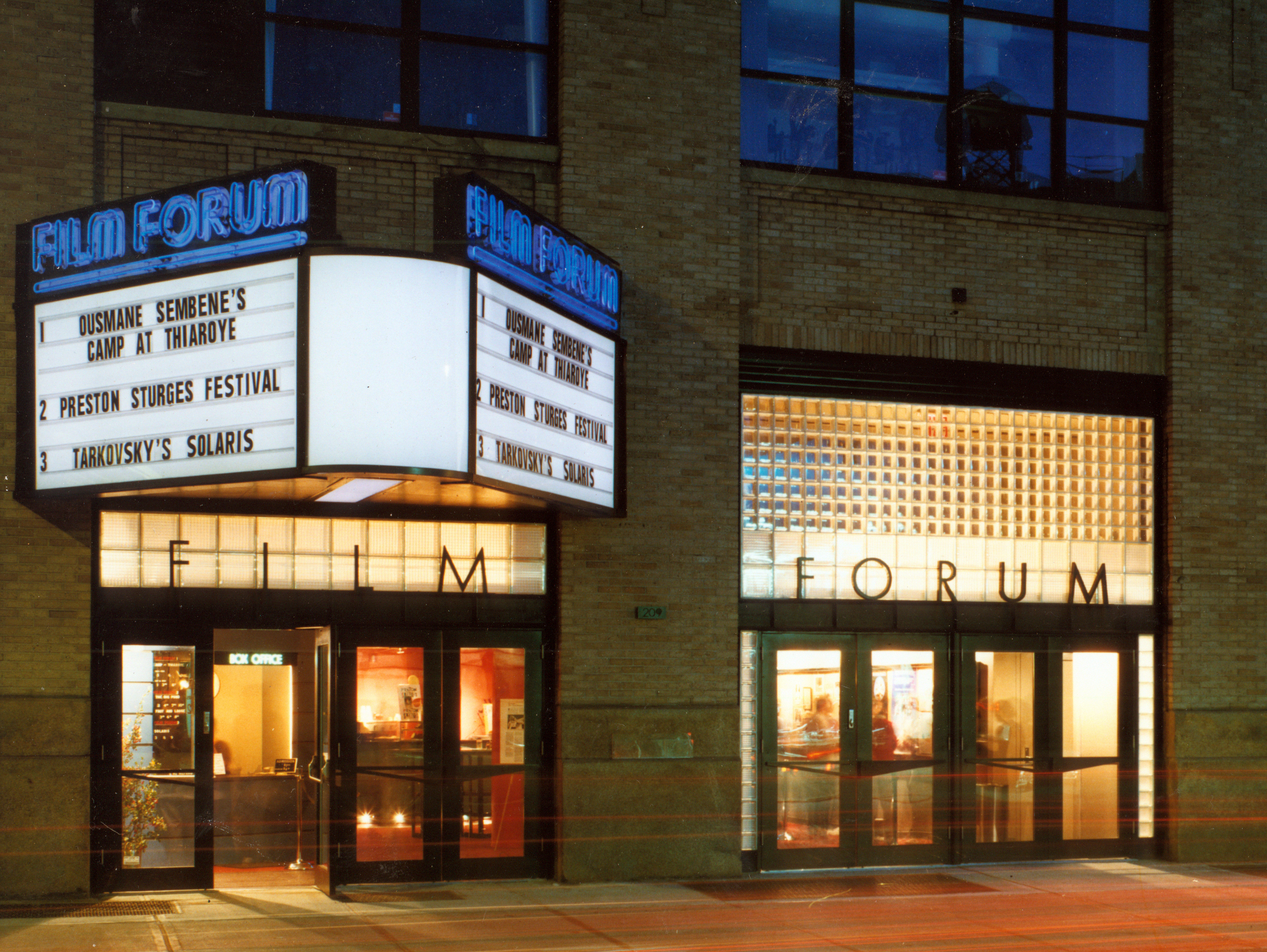
The Revolution Will Not Be Televised had its commercial première at the New York City Film Forum in November 2003.

The Revolution Will Not Be Televised screened at several film festivals in 2003, winning numerous awards. Beginning with the South by Southwest festival on 7 March, its festival appearances included the Banff World Television Festival, the Seattle International Film Festival, the Marseille Festival of Documentary Film, the Three Continents Film Festival, the Chicago International Film Festival, the Monaco International Film Festival, the Galway Film Fleadh and the Los Angeles Wine & Country Festival. In March 2003, a VHS copy of the film screened to under 100 people as part of an American Cinematheque Irish film festival in Los Angeles. Among the viewers was the president of Vitagraph Films, David Schultz, who bought the rights for theatrical distribution and paid for the film to be converted from video. Schultz initially struggled to secure the support of exhibitors; they were skeptical of the film's commercial prospects, and believed "the environment was not hospitable" for a film critical of the US so close to the start of the 2003 invasion of Iraq. They only became receptive a few months later, when political perceptions shifted and the public became more aware of Venezuela because of its oil wealth. One such exhibitor was the Film Forum in New York City. Mike Maggiore, a programmer at the theater, worked to market the film and raise its profile with film critics. He created press kits and circulated information to appeal to "a particular audience".

The Revolution Will Not Be Televised premièred to the public at the Film Forum in November 2003. The showing was accompanied by protests outside the theater from supporters and detractors of the film, both of whom "attempted to influence audience reception". A few weeks previously, the film had been withdrawn from an Amnesty International film festival in Vancouver; staff at the organization's Caracas arm said they "feared for their safety if it were shown". The film's success at the 2003 Grierson Awards was also overshadowed by a letter to the Grierson jury from London-based Venezuelan filmmakers, who disputed its version of events. Opposition demonstrators at the Film Forum première attempted to throw doubt on the film's "impartiality, precision, veracity, editorial integrity, and ideological independence", while supporters "encouraged theatergoers to denounce censorship" and sign a petition. Opposition protests also greeted showings in Canada, Australia and France. The run at the Film Forum earned $26,495 (€22,600)—several thousand above Maggiore's expectations. After a limited run in theaters in six cities, the film had earned over $200,000 (€171,000), (Note: The $200,000 figure is supported by Stoneman, but box office tracking websites The Numbers and Box Office Mojo both say the film earned $153,859 (€131,300) from eight theaters over 59 days.) not quite profitable, but still considered "a significant sum for a documentary".

=== Informal distribution ===
Bartley and Ó Briain showed the film to Chávez in February 2003. They recalled his response as "quite emotional". BSÉ waived Venezuelan licensing fees for the film; on 13 April, it was screened simultaneously with the television broadcast at a cinema in Caracas, before which Chávez made a speech saying, "Watch this film and you will see the face of the coup." Pro-Chávez activists also distributed the film unofficially. The Committee in Solidarity with the People of El Salvador screened the film in New York City, where Bolivarian Circle members "accepted donations" for bootleg copies. El Universal said the Venezuelan government had 10,000 copies made, and according to National Review, the Venezuela Information Office (VIO) "encouraged art-house theaters" to screen the film. Government representatives aided the film's distribution officially and unofficially. Venezuelan filmmaker Wolfgang Schalk said the film counted on the worldwide support of Venezuelan embassies and a public relations effort to show the film free at universities and theaters in cities such as San Francisco, Los Angeles, Chicago and New York. Peace Action New York was given permission for a screening during a fund raiser in the Lincoln Center, where 250 people paid $35 (€30) each to see the film and take part in a "question-and-answer session" with guests such as Leonor Granado, the Venezuelan Consul General. The consulate office made DVDs of the film available to "anyone who wanted a copy", as Granado said the film was vital to "building support in [the US] for the Venezuelan government".

Journalist Michael McCaughan invited a group of people who held anti-Chávez views to a screening of the film. He said some among the audience changed their opinion of Chávez after seeing it, although many remained hostile. McCaughan said the consensus opinion was that the film was "'excellent' and reasonably objective", but that "Chávez remained a dictator leading the country to a totalitarian grave". As of 2006, groups such as Global Exchange were arranging tours to Venezuela that included a screening of the film.

== Analysis ==
=== Disputed accuracy ===
In Venezuela, debate about The Revolution Will Not Be Televised is "often acrimonious". The film has become key to framing people's understanding of the events of April 2002. The previously accepted international view was that Chávez's ousting came from a "spontaneous popular response" to the repression of his regime; the film "directly contradicts" this position, and since its release it has rapidly become "the prevailing interpretation of [the crisis]". The film's critics charge that it omits or misrepresents important events. Much of the criticism is centered on the filmmakers' "use of stock [documentary] devices", such as compositing clips from several events to present them as one incident. Parallel editing also depicts sequences as if they occurred at the same time, when some of the footage was captured on different days. Bartley and Ó Briain justify these methods as standard practice in the construction of documentary realist films. Caracas-based journalist Phil Gunson, writing in Columbia Journalism Review, says that most of the film critics who embraced the film ignored "the complex, messy reality" of the situation. He charges that the filmmakers "omit key facts, invent others, twist the sequence of events to support their case, and replace inconvenient images with others dredged from archives". Bartley and Ó Briain argue that Gunson's points are "issues of dispute" that "continue to divide opinion" in Venezuela. Author Brian A. Nelson says that Bartley and Ó Briain—in their initial meeting with Chávez—did more than merely invoke the Irish general Daniel O'Leary to gain the president's support for filming; Nelson alleges that they offered to portray the president positively in return for open access, with a "you scratch my back if I scratch yours" understanding that he says was ultimately reflected in the film's "unabashed pro-Chavismo."

=== BBC and Ofcom investigations ===
"Controversy and contention began to build around [the film], with a high level of complaints and responses reaching organisers, distributors and curators, culminating in the publication of articles, a petition and formal complaints. ... From the point of view of those who opposed Chávez, The Revolution Will Not Be Televised 'constitutes the main weapon of the Venezuelan government to disseminate internationally a biased, manipulated and lying version of what happens [in the country].'"
—Rod Stoneman, former CEO of BSÉ

Soon after the film's October 2003 broadcast on BBC Two, Venezuelan engineer and filmmaker Wolfgang Schalk began a campaign against The Revolution Will Not Be Televised, representing El Gusano de Luz ("The Worm of Light"), an organization associated with the Venezuelan opposition. In July, Schalk had complained to RTÉ about its broadcast of the film. On 21 October, El Gusano de Luz published a "detailed critique" as part of an internet petition that attracted 11,000 signatories, 85% of whom self-identified as Venezuelan. Directed at the European broadcasters that financed and aired the film, the petition said in part, "The Revolution Will Not Be Televised is being presented as an author's film, as an objective journalistic research film, while it is really a very well plotted and accomplished propaganda operation, supported logistically by the Venezuelan government, with the aim of misleading unprepared spectators of countries who do not know the totality of events." The petition submitted 18 specific points of contention with the film. Venezuelan private television soon aired two programs "dissecting and denouncing" the film, and similar newspaper articles followed.

Much of the anger about the film stemmed from its high profile internationally; that it had been "blessed with the imprimatur of the BBC ... with its connotations of fair and authoritative reporting" only made matters worse. John Burns, writing in The Sunday Times, restated many of Gunson's arguments, and the BBC received 4,000 e-mails demanding that Storyville's commissioning editor, Nick Fraser, be sacked. Toward the end of 2003, the weight of criticism forced the BBC to act. The corporation's complaints unit opened an investigation, and Fraser said the BBC would not show the film again until it had concluded. He wrote to David Power expressing particular concern over an error with the end titles and the use of out-of-chronology footage, saying the latter was "a real problem—particularly ... since it has been used in a film dedicated to exposing the frauds of Venezuelan TV". The furor came at a difficult time for the corporation, which was under the spotlight of the Hutton Inquiry, the official investigation into the circumstances surrounding the death of David Kelly; the BBC had been criticized for reporting that intelligence dossiers had been "sexed up" by the UK government to justify the 2003 invasion of Iraq.

The petition's claims were also taken up by the UK's independent telecommunications regulator, Ofcom. The body investigated official protests made by several Caracas residents. The concerns largely focused on footage of the residents' attending a neighborhood meeting in June 2002, which was positioned in the film as a prelude to the April coup attempt. The residents said that the filmmakers had used footage of them without consent and that the film had misrepresented their views. In September 2005, Ofcom provisionally ruled that it had not upheld the complaints, citing the BBC's internal review and rebuttal as grounds. A subsequent appeal by the residents was unsuccessful. Two weeks after Ofcom's initial ruling, the BBC announced it had closed the complaint and that no further investigations would take place. Stoneman believed the BBC had overreacted, saying its guardedness was merely a product of being a frequent victim of press attacks on its ethos. Fraser said, "The film was very good in many respects, but also misleading." He believed the filmmakers considered Chávez honorable, but having written a book on Peronism was more skeptical himself. Fraser concluded, "I still think it's a good film, because of the coup sequence. It should be seen as a Venezuelan West Wing—biased, of course, but highly entertaining."

=== Responsibility for violence ===
One of the film's key contentions is that the private media aired footage selectively to make it look like the violence of 11 April was caused by Chávez's supporters, portraying them as an "irrational and uncivilized mob". Private television repeatedly showed Chávez's supporters on Puente Llaguno as they shot at Baralt Avenue below, an area purportedly full of opposition marchers. The film says this footage was edited to show the gunmen but not the people near them who were ducking to avoid being shot. It follows with images taken from above the bridge showing an empty Baralt Avenue, claiming that "the opposition march had never taken that route" and that Chávez's supporters were only returning fire. Gunson charges that this edit is itself a misrepresentation, stating that the film does not mention that both sets of marchers were fired upon, and taking issue with the implication that "coup plotters" were the shooters. In response, the filmmakers say, "Nowhere in the film did we say that only [Chávez's supporters] were shot ... Nobody can say with certainty who orchestrated the shootings." Gunson also asserts that the footage of the empty street was taken earlier that day, citing an "analysis of the shadows" by Schalk, who created a counter-documentary, X-Ray of a Lie, to examine The Revolution Will Not Be Televised "scene by scene to uncover [its] narrative strategies and use of artifice". Brian A. Nelson agreed with the analysis, claiming that Baralt Avenue was not as empty as the film portrays and that the filmmakers "put a black bar at the top of the frame to hide the Metropolitan Police trucks that were still there". Bartley and Ó Briain reaffirmed their claim that the opposition did not pass below the Puente Llaguno bridge, citing eyewitness statements—including one from Le Monde Diplomatique's deputy editor—and an Australian documentary, Anatomy of a Coup, that "came to conclusions similar to our own". A Venezuelan documentary, Puente Llaguno: Claves de una Masacre, also supported Bartley and Ó Briain's view.

=== Timeline and media depictions ===
Other issues of contention include the lack of historical context; the film does not cover some of the events leading up to Chávez's ousting, including the long-running political crisis and the general strike. Gunson also criticizes the filmmakers for showing events out of order. In June 2002, they filmed an opposition community group as its members considered "how to defend themselves against possible ... attacks" from Chávez's supporters. In the film, this sequence is placed before the march. Bartley justified the action, saying that the residents' opinions were representative of those held "long before" the events of April 2002. Responding to the critique, the BBC added a date stamp to the sequence for the film's repeat broadcast. Gunson also cites footage of Caracas mayor Freddy Bernal as he sings to a happy group of Chávez supporters in front of the palace. Later images of a "differently dressed Bernal" reveal that the footage was from another day. Similarly, Gunson says that until shot at, "The opposition march was entirely peaceful." The film presents footage of its "violent finale"—including an image from another day—as if it occurred during the protest's approach to the palace, accompanied by the narrated claim that "some in the vanguard looked ready for a fight". Bartley and Ó Briain admit that they included a "limited" amount of archive footage, but say it was a "legitimate reconstruction" to build context "before the core narrative of the coup [took] off" as they "could not be everywhere filming at all times".

The Revolution Will Not Be Televised claims that state television was "the only channel to which [Chávez] had access", but does not mention that during the violence he requisitioned "all radio and TV frequencies" to broadcast his two-hour address. Private television circumvented the rules allowing this action by splitting the screen, showing Chávez's address on one side and footage of the violence on the other. Chávez subsequently took television stations RCTV and Venevisión off the air. The film's assertion that VTV was taken over by opposition "plotters" is also disputed; according to X-Ray of a Lie and Gunson, staff left willingly. Gunson further alleges that footage of VTV's signal being cut—mid-interview with a government legislator—was fabricated. Bartley and Ó Briain say they witnessed ministers' being unable to broadcast and that the International Federation of Journalists corroborated their claim that opposition forces took over VTV. The film also presents footage of armored vehicles around the palace, which Gunson says were there at the request of the president, not the opposition. He also challenges the film for presenting Chávez's supporters as "invariably poor, brown-skinned, and cheerful" and the opposition as "rich, white, racist, and violent". He says that the opposition protests were multiracial and that armed government supporters "made the center of Caracas a no-go area". Bartley and Ó Briain cite several commentators who uphold the claim that Chávez's supporters "were broadly poor and dark-skinned and the opposition broadly white and middle class", including Gunson himself in an April 2002 article in The Christian Science Monitor. Gunson does agree that the film was right to point out that the private media "behaved disgracefully" by "systematically [excluding the pro-Chávez] viewpoint from print, radio, and TV" during the period of the coup.

=== Military involvement ===
Of greater concern, Gunson says, is the "deliberate blurring of responsibility for the coup". The film presents the idea that the military commanders dispersed, "leaving a total power vacuum". However, the high command's senior figure, General Lucas Rincón (who announced Chávez's resignation on television), was not part of the coup and remained in the government after April 2002. The petition draws the conclusion, "(1) either General Rincón stated a truth that was accepted throughout the whole country ... or (2) General Rincón lied, because he was an accomplice ... that seems not to be the truth because he [remained in Chávez's administration]." Only one of the high command joined Carmona's interim administration before contributing to its downfall by withdrawing his support. The military leaders shown withdrawing their support for Chávez were not the high command, and Vice-Admiral Hector Ramirez Perez was not the head of the navy, as the film claims. Gunson says, "With one solitary exception, these generals and admirals had not 'fled abroad' after the Carmona government collapsed." Although Bartley and Ó Briain accept that Rincón said Chávez "had agreed to resign", they reiterate that "elements in the military [threatened] force in the effort to make Chávez resign"; the filmmakers say it is "irrelevant" that the whole military did not join the coup, as this "is the case with most coups". General Rincón's announcement was omitted because they felt it was "supplementary to the main, key fact of the story", that no documentary evidence of the resignation exists.

=== X-Ray of a Lie ===
Schalk investigated The Revolution Will Not Be Televised for five months. Along with producer Thaelman Urguelles, he was commissioned by the Federation of Venezuelan Movie Directors to "produce a response", and in 2004 they created the documentary X-Ray of a Lie, which set out to expose its "manipulation". Schalk said the film "presented a distorted version of events ... to fit a story that appeals to audiences". Schalk is associated with the Venezuelan opposition; Bartley and Ó Briain say that it is "not insignificant that Schalk has led the well-resourced campaign, linked to [the opposition], to discredit and suppress [the film]".

=== Chavez: The Revolution Will Not Be Televised ===
In 2008, Stoneman published Chavez: The Revolution Will Not Be Televised – A Case Study of Politics and the Media. A book "of film studies rather than politics", it nevertheless looks in detail at the petition's arguments. Stoneman "broadly absolves" the filmmakers; he concludes, "There were some relatively small examples of slippage in the grammar of the piece, but overall the film was made with honesty and integrity. Of the 18 objections made, 15, if not 17, were wrong. The filmmakers spent a long time assembling evidence to show why they'd done what they'd done in the film and mostly it's true." Stoneman conceded that the filmmakers' cinéma vérité approach meant that for wider historical and political context, viewers should look elsewhere. Stoneman received an "Executive Producer" credit on the film, which he explains as an unasked-for gratuity that came by virtue of his position as head of BSÉ.

== Reception ==
=== Critical response ===
On the review aggregator website Rotten Tomatoes, 98% of 47 critics' reviews are positive, with an average rating of 7.9/10. The website's consensus reads: "The Revolution Will Not Be Televised is as persuasive and engrossing as it is unapologetically biased." Metacritic, which uses a weighted average, assigned the film a score of 81 out of 100, based on 23 critics, indicating "universal acclaim". Almost all local and national film critics in the United States said the film presented a "riveting narrative", but conceded that it was a biased account of the events.

"The Revolution Will Not Be Televised gets viewers inside these tense, emotional and occasionally terrifying events with immediacy and, given the confusion of the time, remarkable clarity. Bartley and O'Briain are clearly Chavez supporters—their glowing portrait of this controversial leader is never punctuated by critical questions about his policies or methods. But the filmmakers' biases don't stop The Revolution Will Not Be Televised from being riveting drama."
—Ann Hornaday, writing in The Washington Post

Frank Scheck, writing in The Hollywood Reporter, said the film presented an enthralling story that "resembles a taut ... political thriller", and Roger Ebert in the Chicago Sun-Times called it a "remarkable documentary" full of "astonishing shots". Both critics said the film was made so through the filmmakers' unique inside access to the events at the palace with Ebert calling that aspect "unique in film history". Although Ebert was generally very praising of the film, he criticised the way in which Chávez's opponents were portrayed, while Shenk faulted the lack of historical context; however, he said this was balanced by the film's "brevity and succinctness". In Variety, Scott Foundas wrote that the film was a "superior example of fearless filmmakers in exactly the right place at the right time", and likely the best of a string of documentaries that have shone the light on US involvement in South America. He had praise for the camera work and editing, and said the film was a "startling record" that reached "another level" when events shifted to the presidential palace. He cited these scenes—along with those of the protesters' clashing—as ones that "spark with a vibrant tension and uncertainty".

J. Hoberman of The Village Voice said the film was a "gripping" account that did "an excellent job in deconstructing the Venezuelan TV news footage of blood, chaos, and rival crowds", and said it was "nearly a textbook on media manipulation". Writing for The New York Times, Stephen Holden said the film was "a riveting documentary" that delivered "the suspense of a smaller-scale Seven Days in May", citing the way in which it examined how television can be used to "deceive and manipulate the public". He reproached the film's uncritical depiction of Chávez, and how it hinted at CIA involvement without presenting any proof. Ty Burr in The Boston Globe called the film "our best chance" to find out what really happened on 11–13 April, but cautioned that the filmmakers' "pro-Chávez stance" meant that for wider context audiences should look elsewhere, as it left out too much of Chávez's record. Burr also said the film's attempt to make the US into a villain was ineffective. He said, "because [the filmmakers] view the chasm that divides Venezuela purely in the context of the Cold War and Latin American political instability, they downplay the class warfare that's exploding right in front of them." Nevertheless, Burr concluded that the film's narrow focus remained engrossing.

Desson Thomson of The Washington Post stated that the film successfully reproduced the "panic and fear" at the palace as events unfolded, saying it came across like a "raw, Costa-Gavras-style thriller" that was "worth watching down to the last thrilling minute". He said that knowing how uncertain Venezuela's future was made the film even more powerful. Thomson believed the handheld video was put to good use, calling its "news-breaking immediacy ... intoxicating". He concluded, "The Revolution Will Not Be Televised is an extraordinary piece of electronic history. And a riveting movie." In the Miami New Times, Brett Sokol agreed that the film was "never less than thrilling", but said that as history, it was "strictly agitprop". Similarly, Mark Jenkins wrote in the Washington City Paper that the film was "unapologetically polemical", but "notable foremost as a gripping you-are-there account".

=== Accolades ===
The film won several awards in 2003–04. It was also nominated for Best Documentary and Best Irish Film at the Irish Film and Television Awards. The annual International Documentary Film Festival Amsterdam gives an acclaimed filmmaker the chance to screen his or her Top 10 films. In 2007, Iranian filmmaker Maziar Bahari selected The Revolution will not be Televised for his top ten classics from the history of films.

| Film organization | Award won |
|---|---|
| Banff World Television Festival | Best Information and Current Affairs Program; Grand Prize |
| Chicago International Film Festival | Silver Hugo |
| ESB Media Awards | Best Documentary; Journalist of the Year |
| European Broadcasting Union | Golden Link Award (Best Co-Production) |
| Galway Film Fleadh | Best Documentary |
| Grierson Awards | Best International Feature Documentary |
| International Documentary Association | Best Feature Documentary (shared with Balseros) |
| Leeds International Film Festival | Audience Award |
| Los Angeles Wine & Country Festival | Best Documentary |
| Marseille Festival of Documentary Film | Best International Feature Documentary |
| Monaco International Film Festival | Golden Nymph Award (Best European Current Affairs Documentary) |
| Peabody Award | Excellence in Television Broadcasting |
| Prix Italia | Television Documentary |
| Seattle International Film Festival | Best Documentary |
