= W. H. Locke Anderson =

American economist

- Born: William Henry Locke Anderson; February 23, 1933
- Died: September 22, 2002 (aged 69)
- Occupations: Economist; Professor
- Years active: 1968-2002

William Henry Locke Anderson (February 23, 1933 – September 22, 2002) was an American economist and professor at the University of Michigan. During the first half of his career, he did research on macroeconomics; during the second half, he focused on Marxist economics and became an editor of Monthly Review, a Marxist journal.

== Early life and education ==
Anderson earned a B.A. from Williams College in 1955 and a PhD from Harvard University in 1960, immediately after which he joined the economics department of the University of Michigan. He became a full professor in 1968.

== Career ==
In macroeconomics, his research monographs studied corporate finance, investment, and national income theory. He served as a staff economist for the Council of Economic Advisers of the United States President during the administration of Lyndon B. Johnson.

Becoming critical of mainstream economics during the 1960s, he subsequently devoted his energies to Marxian political-economy, believing that "only Marxism provides the intellectual equipment needed to understand the reality of a modern capitalist society". He helped to organize the Union for Radical Political Economy (URPE), which publishes the journal Review of Radical Political Economics. He developed new economics courses in Marxist theory and the economics of women at the University of Michigan and became an associate editor of Monthly Review, a Marxist economics journal, after publishing an essay "Apologizing for capitalism" in 1987. In this essay, Anderson wrote:

As objects of curiosity, although not of course as conversationalists, economists are among the most interesting intellectuals of bourgeois society. They present themselves as scientists and have many of the affectations of science, though they do not have the nerve to wear their cute little white coats in public. But for more than two centuries they have been dedicated producers of the legitimizing ideology of capitalism, its nerve gas for the home front.

Anderson supervised the doctoral dissertations of Dean Baker and Mark Weisbrot.

== Personal life ==
Anderson took early retirement from the University of Michigan in 1988 and moved to New York City, where he was a parishioner of the Abyssinian Baptist Church. He died on September 22, 2002.
