= Mark Weisbrot =

American economist and columnist

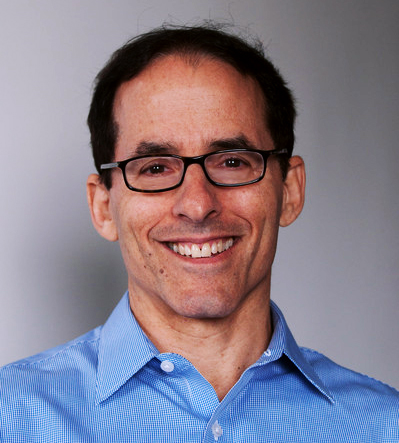
- Born: Mark Alan Weisbrot; Chicago, Illinois U.S.

Academic background
- Education: University of Illinois, Urbana-Champaign (BA); University of Michigan (MA, PhD)

Academic work
- Institutions: Center for Economic and Policy Research
- Website: Information at IDEAS / RePEc

Mark Alan Weisbrot is an American economist and columnist. He is co-director with Dean Baker of the Center for Economic and Policy Research (CEPR) in Washington, D.C. Weisbrot is President of Just Foreign Policy, a non-governmental organization dedicated to reforming United States foreign policy.

== Early life and education ==
Weisbrot was born in Chicago, Illinois. He graduated from the University of Illinois at Urbana–Champaign with a bachelor's degree in economics. Weisbrot received his Ph.D. in economics from the University of Michigan.

== Economics career ==
In 1999, Weisbrot co-founded, together with economist Dean Baker, the Center for Economic and Policy Research (CEPR), a think tank which produces economic research on topics that affect people's lives to contribute to the public debate in the U.S. (inequality, macroeconomic policy and stability, labor markets, health and social programs, intellectual property, social security), and internationally: globalization and trade, the International Monetary Fund and institutions of global governance, Latin American and European economies, and US foreign policy.

Weisbrot provided testimony to Congressional hearings in 2002 to a United States House of Representatives committee on the Argentine economic crisis (1999–2002) and in 2004 to the United States Senate Committee on Foreign Relations on the state of democracy in Venezuela with what he said were U.S. efforts to undermine the government, and the media inside the country.

=== Policy positions ===
As an economist, Weisbrot has opposed privatization of the United States Social Security system and has been critical of neoliberal globalization and the International Monetary Fund (IMF). His work on Greece's ongoing debt crisis has influenced the debate over what measures the Greek government should take in negotiating a solution with the European Central Bank, European Commission, and the International Monetary Fund.

==== Globalization ====
Weisbrot says that globalization as promoted by the United States government and multilateral lending institutions such as the IMF and the World Bank has failed poorer countries, stating that "no nation has ever pulled itself out of poverty under the conditions that Washington imposes on underdeveloped countries." Economist Jeffrey Sachs has stated that Weisbrot was "the leader in fighting" the Washington Consensus behind much of this globalization.

Weisbrot has been described as the "intellectual architect" behind the unsuccessful Bank of the South, a joint project by Argentina, Brazil, Paraguay, Uruguay, Ecuador, Bolivia and Venezuela which was spearheaded by Venezuelan president Hugo Chávez. He criticized the role played by the IMF while taking an active role in promoting the bank, describing the Bank of the South as "another Declaration of Independence for South America" and that it was "Latin America casting off Washington's shackles".

Weisbrot co-authors with CEPR a series of papers looking at the progress in economic growth and social indicators. In 2017, he presented the most recent report, which emphasized the role of China, with Sachs in Washington, D.C.

Weisbrot has continued to suggest that the founding of other alternative lending and finance institutions that do not include participation by the U.S., such as those being created by the BRICS countries, may have positive implications both for borrowing countries and in terms of weakening the influence of Washington-based institutions like the IMF.

==== Latin America ====
Weisbrot has written and co-authored research papers and articles on the economies and politics of Latin America and the Caribbean for the past two decades. The countries covered include Argentina, Brazil, Bolivia, Ecuador, Haiti, Honduras, Jamaica, Mexico, and Venezuela.

Beginning in 2001, Weisbrot challenged the prevailing consensus on the 1998–2002 Argentine great depression, arguing that IMF-supported austerity was counter-productive and that the country needed to devalue its currency in order to recover. After the Argentine government defaulted on its debt at the end of 2001, and allowed the currency to float against the dollar at the beginning of 2002, Weisbrot continued to argue against what he called harmful attempts by the IMF to influence policy in the post-default period. He later wrote papers arguing the Argentina's policies in the 2002-2011 period, after its default and separation from the IMF, were successful.

Weisbrot has argued that, from 2003 to 2011, Brazil was successful in reducing poverty and inequality, and increasing GDP growth. Weisbrot attributed these successes in part to policy changes that were an improvement over the neoliberal program Brazil adopted in the 1980s. However, he was critical of austerity and high interest rates after 2010, arguing that these were unnecessary and led to a prolonged recession. Weisbrot argued against the impeachment of former Brazilian president Dilma Rousseff in 2016 and the corruption conviction of former president Luiz Inácio Lula da Silva in 2018, pointing to a lack of precedent and evidence to justify the proceedings.

===== Venezuela =====
Articles in The New York Times, USA Today, and The Washington Post described Weisbrot as supportive of the policies implemented during Hugo Chávez's presidency. In a 2016 National Review article about Venezuela's deterioration following the Bolivarian Revolution, José Cárdenas, a former employee of the US State Department, the National Security Council and USAID, described Weisbrot as one of the "leftist admirers of Venezuela" and an "ardent cheerleader" of Chávez's socialist project.

In 2013, Weisbrot praised the Venezuelan government for its gains in poverty, real income, employment, healthcare, and education, and said that the possibility of hyperinflation was "very remote", that economic problems were "not likely" and that "Venezuela has sufficient reserves". A 2019 report by Weisbrot and Jeffrey Sachs said that a 31% rise in the number of deaths between 2017 and 2018 was due to the sanctions imposed on Venezuela in 2017, and that 40,000 people in Venezuela may have died as a result. The report states: "The sanctions are depriving Venezuelans of lifesaving medicines, medical equipment, food, and other essential imports." Weisbrot stated that he "could not prove those excess deaths were the result of sanctions, but said the increase ran parallel to the imposition of the measures and an attendant fall in oil production". A US State Department spokesperson said that, "as the writers themselves concede, the report is based on speculation and conjecture" while Harvard economist Ricardo Hausmann, representative to the Inter-American Development Bank by the US-supported administration of Juan Guaidó, said that the analysis was flawed because it made invalid assumptions about Venezuela based on a different country, Colombia, that the analysis failed to rule out other explanations and that it failed to correctly account for PDVSA finances.

===== South of the Border =====
Weisbrot was an advisor, and co-wrote with Tariq Ali the screenplay for the Oliver Stone's 2009 film, South of the Border, which examined the "pink tide" of elected leftist governments in South America.

Weisbrot disagreed with Larry Rohter, the former South American bureau chief of The New York Times, over his statements on Venezuela, where Rohter said that in support of the film South of the Border, Weisbrot, Tariq Ali, and Oliver Stone manipulated data to present a positive image of Hugo Chávez. Rohter described Weisbrot as "... an economist, not a historian, and apparently not a very good one", suggesting that he was "Either ... incompetent [or] deliberately manipulating the numbers." Weisbrot contested the claims of inaccuracies, suggesting that they are indicative of sloppy and misleading coverage of Venezuela in the popular press, and saying that "the way most Americans get the idea that Venezuela is a dictatorship, for example, is from these editorials".

=== Europe ===
==== European Economic Crisis ====
Weisbrot contends that the Great Recession had more impact on EU countries than it did in the United States and that Europe was hit by a secondary recession when the U.S. was not, due to Europe's lack of a sufficient monetary policy response, insistence on austerity measures, and the use of the crisis to advance a political agenda. Weisbrot claims that the European Central Bank is less accountable to EU citizens than the Federal Reserve in the United States and was unable or unwilling to replicate the Fed's recover measures of quantitative easing and a prolonged 0% interest rate. Additionally, he blames Europe's slow recovery from the crisis on austerity-focused policies that reduced government spending, cut pensions, and weakened labor protections, stating that many countries could have shortened the period of economic decline and recovery by leaving the Eurozone.

Weisbrot makes the case that the EU and the European Monetary Union are ideologically different organizations, with the more conservative EMU subjecting low-income member countries to the same policies the IMF has imposed outside of Europe.

==== Greece ====
In 2011, Weisbrot was critical of the Troika, claiming that the European Commission and the European Central Bank had placed constraints on the Greek economy that caused continual loss of GDP and that the IMF's demands for austerity would make recovery difficult. Weisbrot advocated for the restructuring of Greece's debt as a better path forward than imposing austerity measures. He also advocated for the position that the European Central Bank undertake quantitative easing, citing the success of the Federal Reserve's actions in the United States. Weisbrot also predicted that an economic recovery in Greece would be accelerated if Greece abandoned the Euro to avoid punitive measure attached to EU loans, claiming that reducing government spending during recessionary periods is not an effective means of creating the economic growth necessary to end a recession.

=== Asia ===
Weisbrot states that although the Asian economic crisis was precipitated by the sudden reversal of international capital flows, Asian economies were made vulnerable to such reversals by economic liberalization that was encouraged by the IMF. Additionally, Weisbrot claims that the crisis was exacerbated by the IMF's failure to act as a lender of last resort.

The economist also claims that the IMF's insistence on structural reforms were not directly related to the crisis but contributed to the severity and length of the crisis.

== Columns ==
Weisbrot writes for The Nation, and The Hill. He also writes an economic and policy issues column that is distributed across the United States by McClatchy-Tribune Information Services. From 2009 to 2014, he wrote a regular column for The Guardian.

== Books ==
Weisbrot is co-author, with Baker, of Social Security: The Phony Crisis (University of Chicago Press, 1999). In the book, Weisbrot and Baker argue that much of the United States Social Security debate has been based on misconceptions, that privatization would be unlikely to improve the system, and that the system, in fact, performs satisfactorily and does not need substantial changes, needing only minor adjustments to in order to continue to pay all promised benefits for the ensuing 75 years. In reviewing the book, The Economist wrote that “Dean Baker and Mark Weisbrot have no trouble at all demonstrating that even on highly conservative assumptions about economic growth, the much-forecast insolvency of the Social Security system by about 2030 is most unlikely to happen then, if indeed ever.”

Weisbrot's latest book is Failed: What the Experts Got Wrong About the Global Economy (Oxford University Press, 2015). In an interview, Weisbrot described the book as critiquing the bad macroeconomic policies often imposed by European authorities, who are ultimately unaccountable to the citizens of the sovereign states that they represent. These policies, he says, prolonged the economic crises in the aftermath of the Great Recession in Europe, which had a much higher unemployment rate than in the U.S., and forced unpopular economic policies of more vulnerable European countries. Weisbrot has made these arguments in various contexts over the years, for example on Greece, on Spain, and most recently, in The New York Times on the 2017 French presidential election. In an otherwise positive review, Weisbrot was criticized for advocating that Greece would have been better off had it had left the eurozone during its economic crisis. Noam Chomsky called Failed "careful and well-documented" and said it "makes a persuasive case that one goal of the [policies imposed by European authorities] has been to dismantle the social democratic policies that were one of Europe’s contributions to civilized life in the post-World War II period but were unwelcome to major centers of traditional power".

== Reception ==
Francisco Rodríguez, an economist of Wesleyan University accused Weisbrot of being biased for praising Hugo Chávez's economic policies and stated that Weisbrot's work had a "use of heavily slanted data".

In a History News Network article, Larry Rohter, the former South American bureau chief of The New York Times stated that Weisbrot along with his colleague Tariq Ali "have sent to a number of news organizations and websites" claims that were "full of indisputably false assertions". Rohter also says that Weisbrot manipulated data to give a positive image of Hugo Chávez in the film South of the Border. Weisbrot defended his work saying that Rohter didn't find any inaccuracies and that Rohter "tried rather desperately" to find inaccuracies that no one would notice.

== Published works ==
- Weisbrot, Mark Alan (1993). Ideology and Method in the History of Development Economics (Doctor of Philosophy thesis). Ann Arbor, MI: University of Michigan. OCLC 68796746.
- Baker, Dean; Weisbrot, Mark (1999). Social Security: The Phony Crisis. Chicago, IL: Univ. of Chicago Press. ISBN 978-0-226-03544-4. OCLC 41090883.
- Weisbrot, Mark (2015). Failed: What the "Experts" Got Wrong About the Global Economy. New York: Oxford University Press. ISBN 978-0-195-17018-4. OCLC 928088357.
