= Llaguno Overpass events =

Shootout in Venezuela

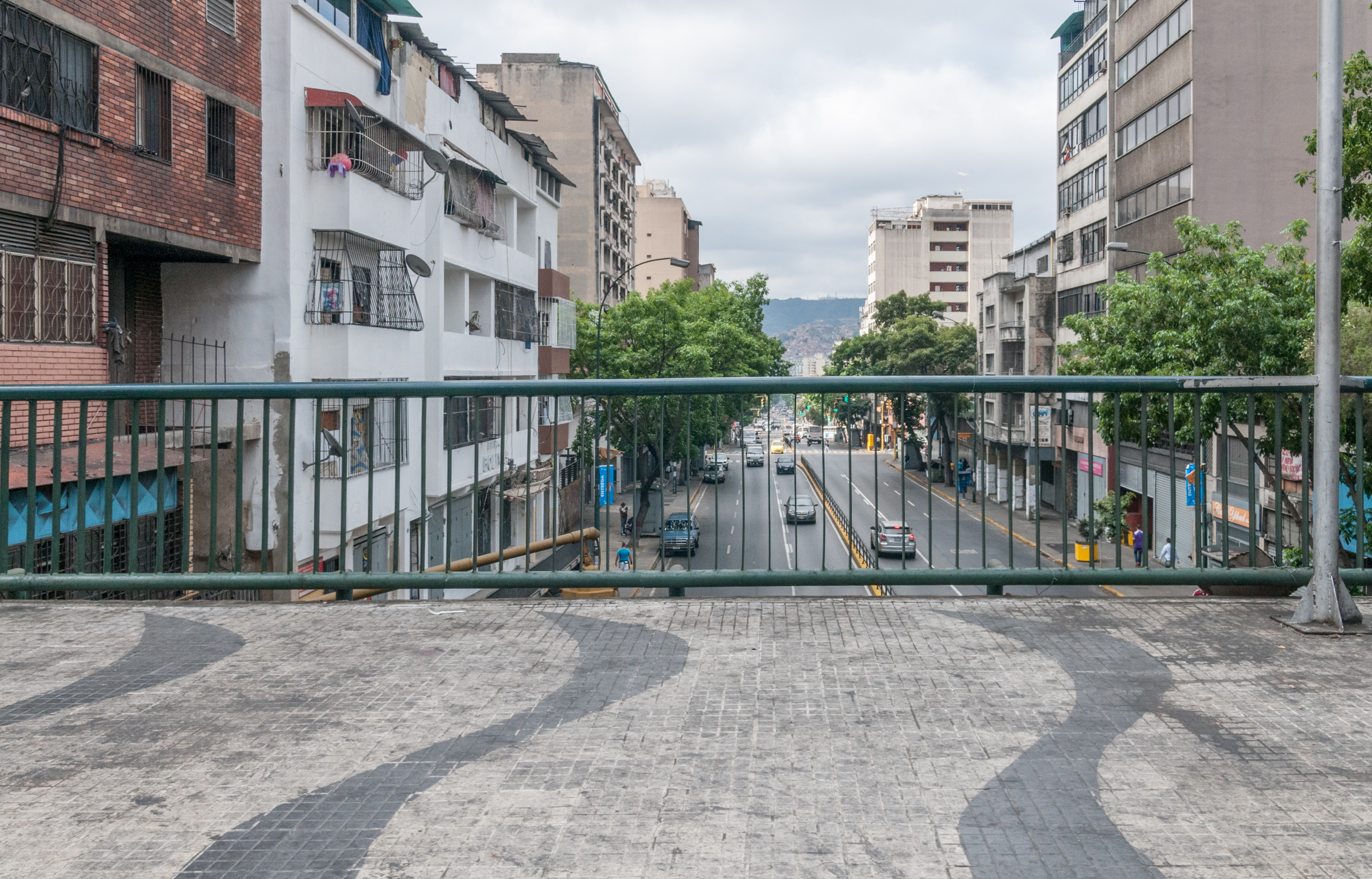
- View from the Llaguno Overpass down to Baralt Avenue.

Lead figures
• Pro-government demonstrators • National Guard • Bolivarian Circles	• Anti-government demonstrators • Metropolitan Police

Casualties and losses
- 19 dead 127 injured

The Llaguno Overpass (Puente Llaguno in Spanish), also known as the Llaguno Bridge, is a bridge in central Caracas, Venezuela, near the Miraflores Palace, made infamous by the events of 11 April 2002, when snipers opened fire upon the crowd of protestors marching on the overpass, also known as El Silencio Massacre, causing 19 deaths and 127 injured people. The events preceded the 2002 Venezuelan coup attempt. The military high command refused Hugo Chávez's order to implement the Plan Ávila as a response to protests against him, a military contingency plan by the army to maintain public order last used in 1989 during The Caracazo, and demanded he resign. President Chávez was subsequently arrested by the military. Chávez's request for asylum in Cuba was denied, and he was ordered to be tried in a Venezuelan court.

== Background ==
=== 11 April march ===
The crisis came when "workers and business leaders," infuriated by Chávez's "meddling in the state oil company," as the Chicago Tribune put it, joined in "calling for a general strike that cut exports" in support of striking oil workers. The strike began, according to The Washington Post, "as a managerial protest at the state-run oil company, but evolved into a broad effort supported by the country's largest business and labor groups to force Chávez from power." After days of general strikes and protests involving thousands of Venezuelans, on 10 April, a speech was held at the CTV headquarters, where CTV and Fedecámaras held speeches that involved a Brigadier General denouncing Chávez's alleged involvement with FARC, and the announcement of a march the next day with the possibility of an indefinite strike. The march on 11 April was to begin at 9:00am, starting at Parque del Este and ending at the PDVSA headquarters.

On 11 April, just hours before an operation to take over the PDVSA by force was to begin, General Rosendo, knowing the consequences of such an action, talked Chávez out of the plan. Later that day, hundreds of thousands to millions of Venezuelans marched to the PDVSA headquarters later that day to protest against the recent dismissal of the management board. Once at the headquarters, those present at the rally began to chant "To Miraflores! To Miraflores! To Miraflores!", in reference to the Miraflores Presidential Palace. In response, Carlos Ortega declared: "This human river is now going to Miraflores to ask for your resignation", referring to Chávez. The National Guard would later repress the concentration in Chuao and, equipped with firearms, would confront the demonstrators in the vicinity of the Miraflores Palace.

== Shootout ==
By 12:30 pm, thousands of government supporters were gathered around the palace blocking all routes to Miraflores except for the Llaguno Overpass, which was where the Bolivarian Circles had gathered to overlook the route. As the march turned a corner and began to approach the Miraflores at about 2:00 pm, the National Guard fired about twelve tear gas canisters from behind the palace walls and the protesters fled back down the road. The protesters made it closer to Miraflores and the Presidential Guard responded with more tear gas. About 20 gas canisters caused panic and a dispersion of the demonstrators to areas surrounding the palace.

Since other routes were blocked by the National Guard, many marchers began to head down Baralt Avenue in order to reach Miraflores. On Baralt Avenue, near the Llaguno Overpass as the march inched closer hundreds of Chávez supporters gathered and began throwing large rocks, Molotov cocktails and even tear gas at the demonstrators. As marchers and Chavistas clashed, the Metropolitan Police attempted to separate both sides from further confrontation with two trucks with water cannons.

A few minutes after Chávez's broadcast at 3:45 pm, gunfire erupted again and the march began to disperse slightly. As the demonstrators marched closer to the Llaguno Overpass, they could see Chavistas heavily armed, some with pistols. Police began to disperse the Chavista gunmen returning fire and few demonstrators began to follow behind them with pings of gunfire heard on the police armored vehicles, though the marchers fled shortly after as the violence grew. According to medical staff at the Vargas Hospital, the first to arrive at the hospital were opposition marchers. According to surgeons, the marchers had been shot in the back with handgun fire while fleeing and others were severely injured from 7.62×51mm NATO military rounds from Fal rifles, standard equipment of the National Guard defending Chávez. Later after police responded to pro-Chávez shooting, Chávez supporters then began being seen injured in the hospitals. As a result of the confrontations, 19 were left dead, most killed between 3:20 pm and 3:55 pm, and over 150 injured.

The military high command refused Chávez's order to implement the Plan Ávila as a response to the protests, a military contingency plan by the Venezuelan Army to maintain public order last used in 1989 during the Caracazo that resulted in hundred of deaths, and demanded he resign. President Chávez was subsequently arrested by the military. Chávez's request for asylum in Cuba was denied, and he was ordered to be tried in a Venezuelan court.

== Responsibility ==
External media

Images
- Gallery of the violence and other images related to the coup.

Video
- The shooting of opposition marcher Jesús Orlando Arellano, resulting in the first fatality of the day.
- Photographer Jorge Tortoza being shot and killed followed by protester Malvina Pesate being shot in the face from the pro-Chávez crowd.
- Pro-Chávez gunman Erasmo Sánchez being carried away after being shot. He was reportedly the first pro-Chávez fatality of the day.

The majority of the violence that took place on 11 April 2002 was near the Llaguno Overpass. There is no consensus as to who was responsible for the deaths on that day, and this remains a very controversial issue. The opposition version of events puts the blame on Chávez, or at least on his supporters. Many groups of the Bolivarian Circles gathered near the Llaguno Overpass before the march reached the area. A Venevisión camera positioned on a rooftop that afternoon captured images of people using handguns to shoot from the pro-Chávez counter-march being held on the Llaguno Overpass, an overpass that crosses one of central Caracas's busiest avenues. A number of high-ranking military officers, led by Vice Admiral Héctor Ramírez, recorded a video message broadcast later in the day that held Chávez responsible for massacring innocent people using snipers, referring to at least six dead and dozens wounded. CNN correspondent Otto Neustald Neustald claimed the message was recorded at least two hours before the killings started. However, this claim has never been proven and is contested by the rest of the reporters present, such as Javier Ignacio Mayorca, Mayela León and Adrián Criscaut, who affirmed that the military officers were informed of the death of Tortoza during the filming of the message.

Several witnesses reported seeing people shooting from two specific locations: the Ausonia Hotel and the Eden Hotel. The head of the Casa Militar at the time, the guard of the president of Venezuela, Colonel Almidien Ramon Moreno Acosta, states in a report presented on May 15, 2002 before the National Assembly that ten suspects were detained on April 11 under the accusation of being snipers. Three of them were captured by a group of unidentified citizens and handed over to Casa Militar. There were no reports as to whether any firearms were seized from them. The remaining seven were captured directly by officers of the Guardia de Honor, the Casa Militar.

The seven individuals were fully identified because they had registered with their real names at the Ausonia Hotel. Only one of them was carrying an unfired .38 caliber weapon. On April 12 they were handed over to the Prosecutor's Office and tried in court, but were released because there was insufficient evidence to charge them. The revolver had not been fired and no traces were found on any part of the detainees' bodies or clothing.

The La Nacional building housed the offices of pro-Chávez mayor Freddy Bernal. Bernal, a Chávez supporter and former leader of an elite police force, was accused by a Venezuelan military officer of complying with orders from the Defense Ministry to shoot opposition demonstrators. It was also reported that the National Guard, which was firing tear gas and combatting the opposition protesters, did not pay any attention to the gunmen on the La Nacional building and that it was the Metropolitan Police who had attempted to go to the building. Bernal dismissed the allegations as "totally false".

The 2003 documentary titled The Revolution Will Not Be Televised contradicts claims by private media in Venezuela that the pro-Chávez group was firing on the opposition protest from Llaguno Bridge. In the documentary, footage captured from another angle by an amateur cameraman shows pro-Chávez gunmen firing over an empty street with no apparent opposition protesters below. Further, the film makers claim that the opposition march never went down that street. While this documentary has been criticized by another called X-Ray of a Lie and American academic Brian Nelson, who argue that the footage is manipulated and obscures Metropolitan Police on the street below, it's not clear whether this is relevant to the veracity of the claim that pro-Chávez gunmen were not firing on opposition protesters from the bridge.

The 2004 documentary Puente Llaguno: Claves de una Masacre claimed that the Chavistas on the bridge did not begin shooting until 4:38 pm, by which time most of the opposition deaths had already occurred. Nelson responds that such claims are false by showing that opposition demonstrator Jesús Arellano was killed just before 2:30 pm, with photos showing Chavistas further up the street brandishing firearms and closer than purported by the earlier sources.

Within the next 15 minutes, two other opposition demonstrators were shot at 2:45 and 4:30 pm, the Metropolitan Police responded to the Chavista gunfire by going between the marchers and the Chavistas. The Chavistas responded to the Metropolitan Police by moving further up the street and at around 4:35 pm, began firing down from Llaguno Bridge onto Baralt Avenue below. Police responded to the Chavista gunfire, with one Chavista who was lying on the bridge being shot in the face, with his body positioning of lying down and facing the Metropolitan Police below possibly resulting in the headshot. Ricochets were also possible from Chavistas ranks firing through the spokes of the railing on the bridge. After 5:30 pm when most of the gunfire concluded, the filmmakers of The Revolution Will Not Be Televised used manipulated footage, according to Nelson, in order to show an empty Baralt Avenue that Chavistas were overlooking. A vehicle used by the Metropolitan Police later showed that approximately 600 bullets impacted the vehicle's side that was facing north toward the Puente Llaguno bridge.

=== Scene cleanup ===
After 11 April, the Baralt Avenue was closed as a crime scene and remained closed while Carmona was in power. However, upon Chávez's return on 14 April, cleaning crews under the orders of Freddy Bernal, mayor of the Libertador Municipality and leader of the Bolivarian Circles, began to fix the damages in the street. The crews swiftly repaired the traffic lights, restored the kiosks, painted the walls, covered the splinters in the cement surfaces and replaced the damaged street lamps free of charge. Workers removed bullets from the walls and scoured the drains for shell casings as well. Within five days, all physical evidence at the site had been collected and destroyed, and on April 20 the avenue was reopened. The Chávez government proceeded to transfer detectives and prosecutors who opened investigations and replace them with more submissive supporters.

=== Criminal investigation ===
The people filmed shooting from the Puente Llaguno bridge were initially identified as being pro-Chávez political activists Rafael Cabrices, Richard Peñalver, Henry Atencio, and Nicolás Rivera. They were captured by the police and jailed for one year as they awaited trial, but charges were dropped before the trial began. Rafael Cabrices died from a heart attack three years later, in August 2005. Henry Atencio died fifteen years later, in May 2017, and Richard Pēnalver died 24 years later in the 2026 Venezuelan earthquakes.

== See also ==
- 2002 Venezuelan coup d'état attempt
- The Revolution Will Not Be Televised (film)
- X-Ray of a Lie
- Puente Llaguno: Claves de una Masacre
- List of massacres in Venezuela
