= Dean Baker =

American economist (born 1958)

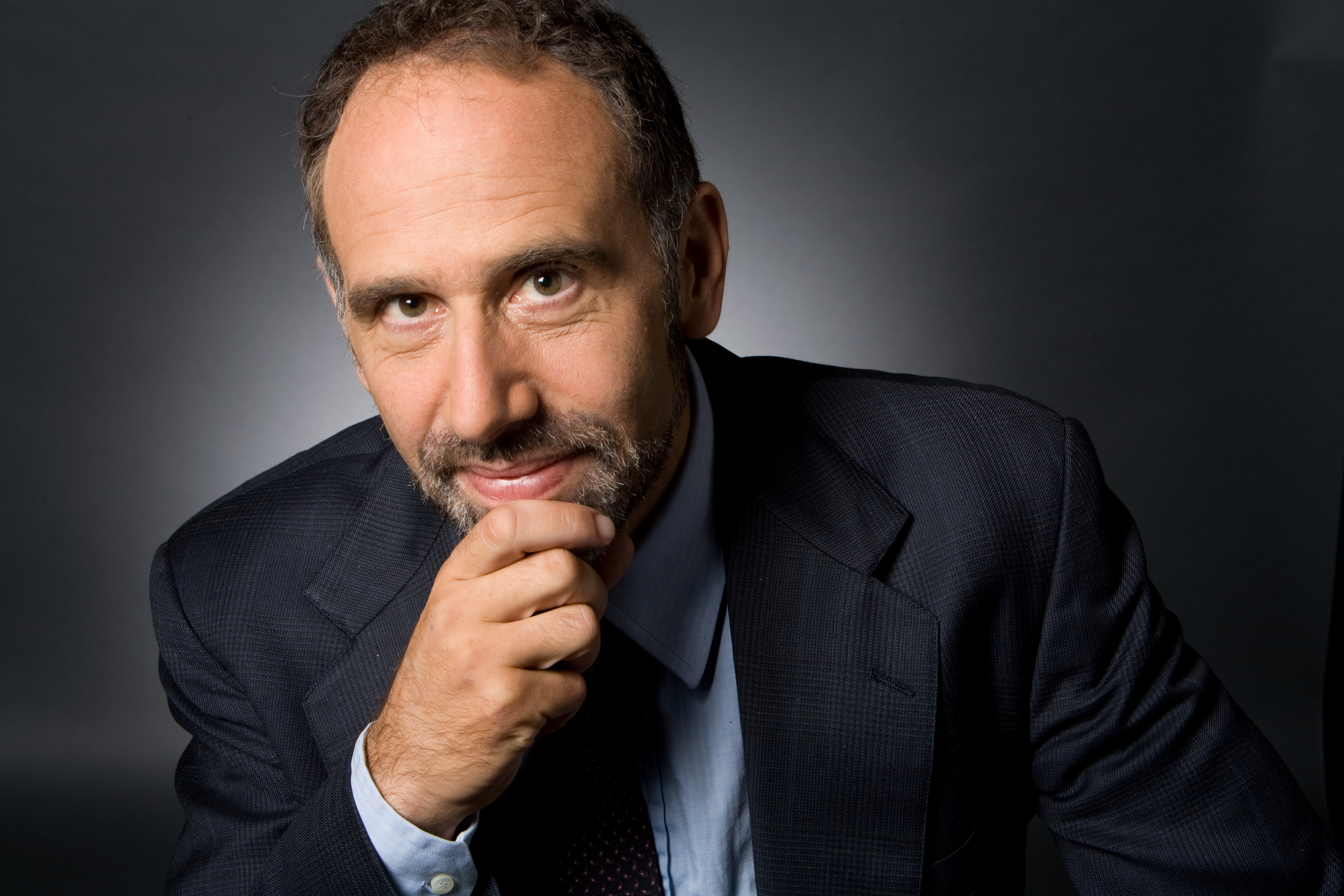
- Born: July 13, 1958 (age 68); Columbus, Ohio

Academic background
- Education: Swarthmore College (BA); University of Denver (MA); University of Michigan (PhD)
- Doctoral advisor: W. H. Locke Anderson

Academic work
- Discipline: Economics macroeconomics Real estate economics Urban economics
- Institutions: Center for Economic and Policy Research; Bucknell University
- Website: DeanBaker.net; Information at IDEAS / RePEc

Dean Baker (born July 13, 1958) is an American macroeconomist who co-founded the Center for Economic and Policy Research (CEPR) with Mark Weisbrot. Baker has been credited as one of the first economists to have identified the 2007–08 United States housing bubble.

== Early life and education ==
Baker was born into a Jewish family and grew up in the Lake View neighborhood of Chicago, Illinois. In 1981, Baker graduated from Swarthmore College with a bachelor's degree in history with minors in economics and philosophy. In 1983, he received a master's degree in economics from the University of Denver. In 1988, he received a PhD from the University of Michigan in economics.

== Economics career ==
Baker was a lecturer at the University of Michigan from 1988 to 1989 and an assistant professor of economics at Bucknell University from 1989 to 1992. From 1992 to 1998, he was an economist at the Economic Policy Institute. During this time, he published a paper with fellow economist Mark Weisbrot in a journal of evolutionary economics.

In 1999, Baker and Weisbrot co-founded the Center for Economic and Policy Research (CEPR), an independent, nonpartisan, progressive think tank that produces economic research on U.S. domestic affairs (social security, healthcare, the federal budget), and international topics (the global economy, the International Monetary Fund, Latin America policy). In that same year Baker was a senior research fellow at the Preamble Center for Public Policy.

Baker has consulted with officials from the World Bank and provided testimony to the Joint Economic Committee of the U.S. Congress and to the OECD's Trade Union Advisory Council.

From 1996 to 2006, Baker wrote the "Economic Reporting Review", a weekly online commentary on the economics reporting of The New York Times and The Washington Post. Since 2006, he has continued this commentary on his blog Beat The Press, formerly published at The American Prospect and now on CEPR's website.

=== 2007–08 United States housing bubble ===
In 2006 Baker predicted that "plunging housing investment will likely push the economy into recession." That year he published "Recession Looms for the U.S. Economy in 2007", in which he predicted that weakness in the US housing market was likely in 2007 to push the US economy into a recession.

Baker won the Revere Award, along with Steve Keen and Nouriel Roubini, for predicting the crash of the United States housing bubble and the resulting recession, which occurred from 2007 to 2008. He warned about the coming crisis and the related government policies in multiple articles, op-eds and interviews from 2002 to 2005. Basing his outlook on housing price data sets produced by the U.S. government, Baker asserted that there was a bubble in the US housing market in August 2002, well before its peak, and predicted that the bubble's collapse would lead to recession. His prediction for when the recession would start was off by only one quarter.

Regarding the housing bubble, Baker was critical of Federal Reserve chair Alan Greenspan. He has also been critical of the regulatory framework of the real estate and financial industries, the use of financial instruments like collateralized debt obligation, and U.S. politicians and regulators' performance and conflicts of interest.

Baker opposed the U.S. government bailout of Wall Street banks on the basis that the only people who stood to lose from their collapse were their shareholders and high-income CEOs. Of any hypothetical negative effects of not extending the bailout, he said, "We know how to keep the financial system operating even as banks go into bankruptcy and receivership," citing U.S. government action taken during the S&L crisis of the 1980s. He has ridiculed the U.S. elite for favoring it, asking, "How do you make a DC intellectual look less articulate than Sarah Palin being interviewed by Katie Couric? That's easy. You ask them how failure to pass the bailout will give us a Great Depression."

=== Rigged ===
Baker's 2016 book Rigged: How Globalization and the Rules of the Modern Economy Were Structured to Make the Rich Richer argues that changing how the U.S. economy has been managed over the past 50 years would add between $2 and 3.7 trillion (in constant 2016 dollars) to the U.S. GDP, between 11 and 20 percent. This is summarized in his Table 8-1:

policy	billions of 2016 USD		% of savings		% of GDP	
policy	low	high	low	high	low	high
full-employment	$1,115	$2,300	56%	62%	6.0%	12.3%
financial sector waste	$460	$636	23%	17%	2.5%	3.4%
patent/copyright monopolies	$217	$434	11%	12%	1.2%	2.3%
corporate governance	$90	$145	5%	4%	0.5%	0.8%
protecting highly paid professions	$100	$200	5%	5%	0.5%	1.1%
Total	$1,982	$3,715			10.6%	19.9%

In Rigged, Baker argues that, for example, focusing more on decreasing unemployment and less on minimizing inflation would primarily benefit the bottom 99%, though the top 1% would get some of those gains. Similarly, Baker says that changes in patent and copyright law over the past 50 years have violated their purpose under the Copyright Clause of the Constitution: "To promote the progress of science and the useful arts". He concludes that if the U.S. had spent the same amount on research and media with the results being placed in the public domain, everyone would be better off, with the possible exception of the ultra-wealthy. In particular, the world would be healthier not having to pay patent royalties to U.S. pharmaceutical companies.

He also writes that so-called free-trade agreements have exempted doctors and other highly paid professionals, not because of any intrinsic difference in what they do, but because they have more political power than organized labor.

== Political activism ==
As a graduate student at the University of Michigan, Baker was arrested at two sit-ins protesting Representative Carl Pursell's votes for military aid to the Contras. In 1986, Baker defeated Donald Grimes in the Democratic primary and ran unsuccessfully against Pursell to represent Michigan's second Congressional district; his candidacy opposed aid to the Contras.

Baker endorsed Elizabeth Warren's 2020 presidential campaign.

== Personal life ==
Baker is married to economist Helene Jorgensen. They live in Astoria, Oregon and he is a visiting professor at the University of Utah.

== Bibliography ==
=== Selected articles ===
- Baker, Dean; Weisbrot, Mark (December 1994). "The Logic of Contested Exchange". Journal of Economic Issues. 28 (4): 1091–1114. doi:10.1080/00213624.1994.11505613. JSTOR 4226888.
- Baker, Dean; Hassett, Kevin (May 12, 2012). "The Human Disaster of Unemployment". The New York Times.

=== Books ===
- Baker, Dean (1988). The Logic of Neo-Classical Consumption Theory. Ann Arbor, MI: University of Michigan. OCLC 68299542.
- Baker, Dean; Weisbrot, Mark (1999). Social Security: The Phony Crisis. Chicago, IL: Univ. of Chicago Press. ISBN 978-0-226-03544-4. OCLC 41090883.
- Bernstein, Jared; Baker, Dean (2003). The Benefits of Full Employment: When Markets Work for People. Washington, DC: Economic Policy Institute. ISBN 978-1-932-06604-3. OCLC 52467815.
- Baker, Dean (2006). The Conservative Nanny State How the Wealthy Use the Government to Stay Rich and Get Richer (Various formats). Washington, DC: Center for Economic and Policy Research. ISBN 978-1-411-69395-1. OCLC 71423207.
- Baker, Dean (2007). The United States Since 1980. Cambridge, England: Cambridge University Press. doi:10.1017/CBO9780511510830. ISBN 978-0-511-27471-8. OCLC 252534980.
- Baker, Dean; Frank, Thomas (foreword by) (2009). Plunder and Blunder the Rise and Fall of the Bubble Economy. San Francisco, CA: Berrett-Koehler Publishers. ISBN 978-1-609-94478-0. OCLC 742517362.
- Baker, Dean (2011). False Profits Recovering from the Bubble Economy. San Francisco, CA: Berrett-Koehler Publishers. ISBN 978-1-609-94475-9. OCLC 740435886.
- Baker, Dean (2010). Taking Economics Seriously. Cambridge, MA: MIT Press. ISBN 978-0-262-01418-2. OCLC 939219451.
- Baker, Dean (2011). The End of Loser Liberalism: Making Markets Progressive. Washington, DC: Center for Economic and Policy Research. ISBN 978-0-615-53363-6. OCLC 765978209.
- Baker, Dean; Bernstein, Jared (2013). Getting Back to Full Employment: A Better Bargain for Working People (PDF). Washington, DC: Center for Economic and Policy Research. ISBN 978-0-615-91835-8. OCLC 866909924.
- Baker, Dean (2016). Rigged: How Globalization and the Rules of the Modern Economy Were Structured to Make the Rich Richer (PDF). Washington, DC: Center for Economic and Policy Research. ISBN 978-0-692-79336-7. OCLC 961184821.
