= Richard Peñalver =

Venezuelan politician (1964–2026)

Councilman of the Libertador Municipality of Caracas

Personal details
- Born: 31 March 1964 Venezuela
- Died: 24 June 2026 (aged 62) Caracas, Venezuela
- Party: United Socialist Party of Venezuela (2007–2026); Fifth Republic Movement (2007)
- Known for: Being a gunman in the Llaguno Overpass events

Richard Peñalver (31 March 1964 – 24 June 2026) was a Venezuelan politician and a member of the Fifth Republic Movement (MVR). He was one of the individuals filmed during the Llaguno Overpass events on 11 April 2002.

== Career ==
Richard Peñalver was one of the four citizens identified in media images (along with Rafael Cabrices, Henry Atencio, and Nicolás Rivera) firing shots from the Llaguno Bridge in Caracas on 11 April 2002. Conflicting versions exist regarding the nature of these shots: while various sectors and media outlets argued they were directed at the opposition march heading toward the Miraflores Palace, the defense contended during the judicial process that the shots were fired toward an area clear of demonstrators and as a defensive response to crossfire from the Metropolitan Police and snipers in elevated positions. His defense was handled by Maikel Moreno, who would later become president of the Supreme Court of Justice of Venezuela.

This argument was evaluated by the Supreme Court of Justice, resulting in the acquittal of the accused, who were later granted amnesty in 2007 by Attorney General Luisa Ortega Díaz and President Hugo Chávez.

Peñalver was a councilman for the Libertador Municipality of Caracas for the United Socialist Party of Venezuela (PSUV) in 2011. On the morning of 24 May 2011, he was shot in the right ankle after an argument with the driver of a pickup truck. Peñalver was quickly taken to a nearby medical center.

On 12 April 2015, he was decorated by Aristóbulo Istúriz, then governor of Anzoátegui, with the Order of Casa Fuerte, First Class. On 2 April 2018, police in Santa Cruz de Tenerife recorded that Richard had requested political asylum in Spain, which was rejected.

== Death ==
Peñalver, his wife and their daughters died on 24 June 2026 when their home in Caracas collapsed during the two M_{w} 7.2 and M_{w} 7.5 earthquakes that struck Yaracuy.

== See also ==
- 2002 Venezuelan coup attempt
