= Puente Llaguno: Claves de una Masacre =

- Directed by: Ángel Palacios
- Written by: Ángel Palacios
- Release date: 2004
- Running time: 105 min
- Country: Venezuela
- Language: Spanish

Puente Llaguno: Claves de una Masacre (English: Llaguno Bridge: Keys to a Massacre) (2004) is a documentary film about the events of the 2002 Llaguno Overpass events in Caracas, Venezuela.

== Synopsis ==
The film argues that "anti-Chávez opposition alliance manipulated coverage ... to make it look like the government used gunmen to shoot and kill opposition demonstrators". The Puente Llaguno of the title is a bridge in central Caracas, near the Miraflores Palace, made infamous by the events of 11 April 2002, when Venezuelan private media showed gunmen firing from it at opposition protestors.

The documentary claimed that the Chavistas on the bridge did not begin shooting until 4:38 pm, by which time most of the opposition deaths had already occurred. American academic Brian Nelson responds that such claims are false, showing that opposition demonstrator Jesús Arellano was killed just before 2:30 pm, with photos showing Chavistas further up the street brandishing firearms and closer than purported by the earlier sources.

== Production ==
Director Ángel Palacios is described as a "staunch supporter of President Hugo Chávez who is nevertheless frequently critical of stances taken by the government"; he graduated in film studies from Cuba's San Antonio de los Baños.

== See also ==
- 2002 Venezuelan coup d'état attempt
- Llaguno Overpass
- The Revolution Will Not Be Televised (film)
- X-Ray of a Lie
