= Bank of the South =

South American monetary fund and lending organization

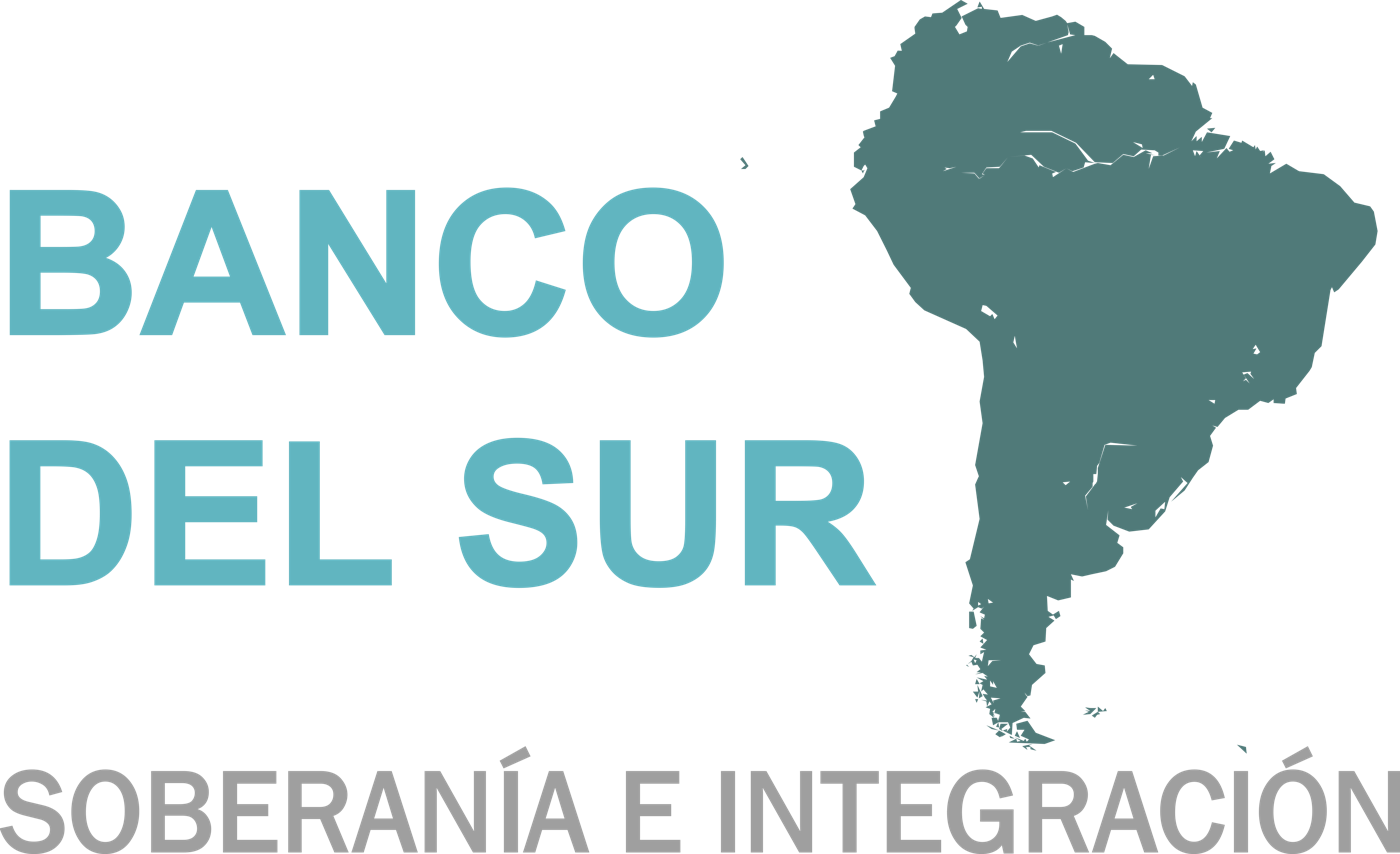
- Type: Public
- Industry: Finance and Development
- Founded: 9 December 2007 (founding charter); 26 September 2009 (final agreement)
- Headquarters: Caracas

The Bank of the South (Spanish: Banco del Sur, Portuguese: Banco do Sul, Dutch: Bank van het Zuiden) or BancoSur is a monetary fund and lending organization established on 26 September 2009 by Argentina, Brazil, Paraguay, Uruguay, Ecuador, Bolivia and Venezuela with promises of initial capital of US$20 billion. Argentina, Venezuela, and Brazil were each to pledge $4 billion, and Uruguay, Ecuador, Paraguay and Bolivia were to have contributed smaller amounts. The bank intended to lend money to nations in the Americas to construct social programs and infrastructure. Documents establishing the bank as an entity were signed in 2007, and the agreement between the countries was finalized in 2009, but as of 2016, the bank had not been capitalized.

== Plans and involvement ==
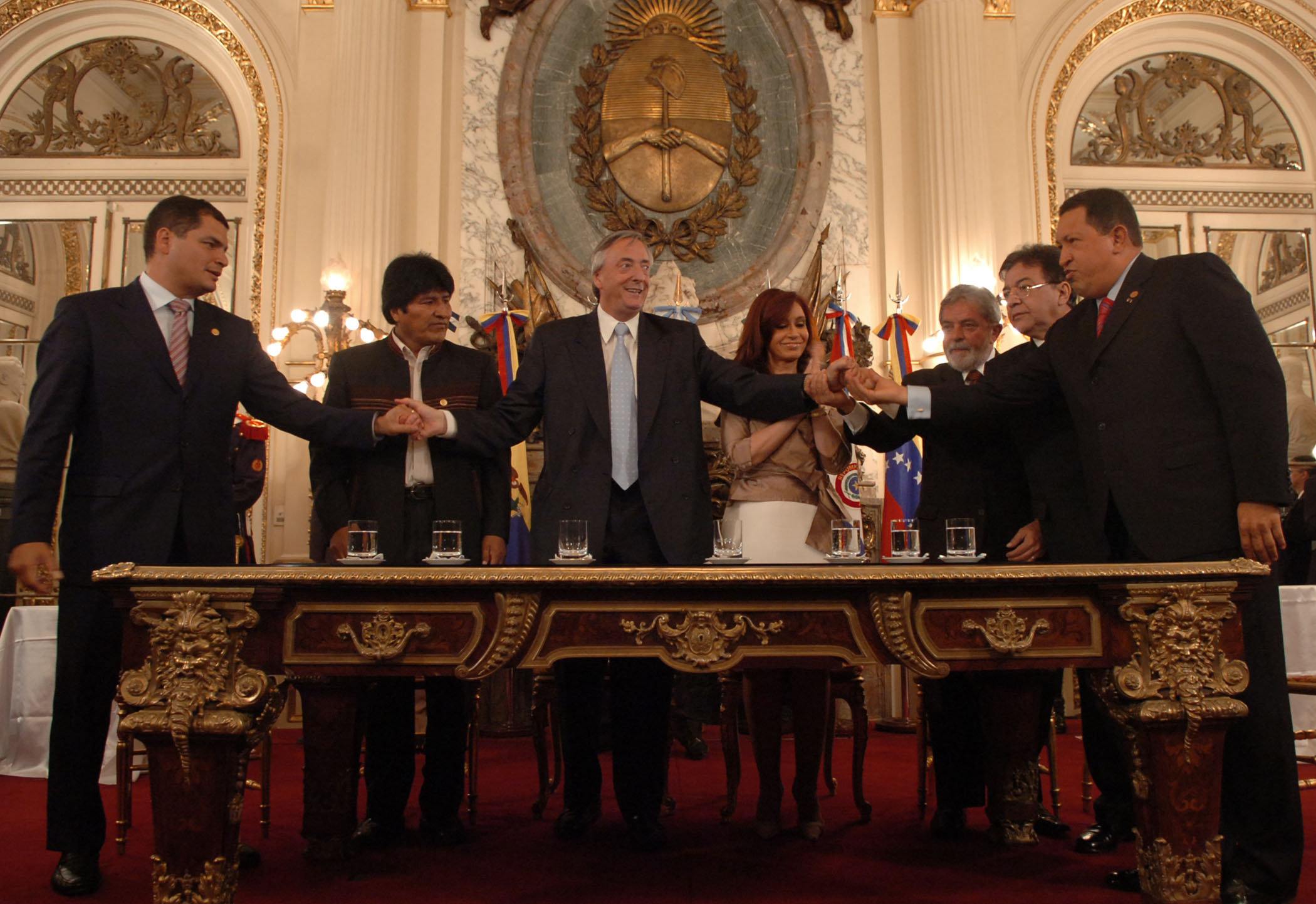
Rafael Correa, Evo Morales, Néstor Kirchner, Cristina Fernández, Luiz Inácio Lula da Silva, Nicanor Duarte, and Hugo Chávez at the signing of the founding charter of the Bank of the South

The ultimate goal of the Bank of the South is to include every state within the region of South America. It has been established because of disapproval of the protocol of the World Bank and International Monetary Fund (IMF), in particular the enforcement of unrelated free market reforms on countries seeking emergency loans. It also represents an attempt to achieve regional independence and endogenous development. The program would lend money to any nation involved in the construction of approved programs, and without conditions traditionally attached to such loans, such as deregulation.

The Bank is intended as an alternative to borrowing from the IMF and the World Bank. Hugo Chávez promised to withdraw from the IMF and encouraged other member states to do so as well. Latin America's dependence on the IMF fell dramatically between 2005 and 2008, with outstanding loans falling from 80% of the IMF's $81bn loan portfolio, to 1% of the IMF's $17bn of outstanding loans. Brazil and Argentina are also refusing to borrow from the IMF again.

It is proposed that all member countries contribute fairly equal shares to the Bank's initial capital of fourteen billion Brazilian reais (seven billion US dollars) so that no member state will control a dominant share. Argentina joined with Venezuela to officially propose such an initiative, but Brazil also became a major player. Additionally, the bank will feature a one-state one-vote structure, unlike the IMF.

== History ==
=== Founding ===
The concept was first raised during the first presidential campaign of Venezuelan President Hugo Chávez, in 1998. Chavez consulted regularly with Mark Weisbrot, who has been described as the "intellectual architect" of the project. The concept was originally launched in 2006 in a cooperation between Venezuela and Argentina, led by their respective Presidents Hugo Chávez and Néstor Kirchner.

In May 2007, a meeting in Quito led to the official creation of the bank, and was said to indisputably signify another step towards Latin American integration.

Seven South American nations met in Rio de Janeiro on 8 October 2007, to plan the beginning of the Bank. It was announced that the Bank will be headquartered in Caracas, Venezuela, and would begin operations on 3 November 2007; this was later postponed to 5 December 2007, and then to 9 December 2007. Representatives from Argentina, Bolivia, Brazil, Ecuador, Paraguay, Uruguay and Venezuela were present at the meeting. All 12 South American countries will be eligible to borrow from the Bank. In a surprise move, Colombia formally requested membership in the bank on 13 October 2007. As of 25 April 2008, the bank was still awaiting its member nations to have their local legislatures approve their individual capital investments. Member voting rights were yet to be determined at that time.

In March 2009 a number of Latin American nations agreed to contribute US$7 billion towards the bank's start-up capital. Venezuela, Argentina, and Brazil are to contribute $2 billion each, and Ecuador, Bolivia, Paraguay, and Uruguay agreed to contribute varying amounts to provide the remaining US$1 billion.

On 26 September 2009, the presidents of Argentina, Brazil, Paraguay, Uruguay, Ecuador, Bolivia and Venezuela signed an agreement establishing the South Bank with an initial capital of US$20 billion. Leaders including Brazilian President Luiz Inácio Lula da Silva and Argentina's Cristina Fernández de Kirchner formally signed up to the pact and announced that the starting capital would be US$20 billion. It was unclear how much each country would contribute, but under the previous US$7 billion figure announced in May, Argentina, Venezuela and Brazil were each to pledge US$2 billion, while Uruguay, Ecuador, Paraguay and Bolivia were to have invested smaller amounts.

=== Delay ===
By 2016, the Bank of the South never received its first deposits. By 2017, the Bank of the South program was on hold. President of Ecuador, Rafael Correa, stated in May 2017 that, "There is no good news for the Bank of the South. It is in papers but it has not been able to start working and I fear that it will not be able to be done in the short term". Following the controversies surrounding the 2017 Constituent Assembly of Venezuela in August 2017, Chancellor of Uruguay Rodolfo Nin Novoa stated that Uruguay was evaluating its exit from the Bank of the South as well as TeleSUR due to Venezuela's influence in the groups.

== Reception ==
In 2010, Americas Quarterly wrote that "Banco del Sur will have a negative effect on the region’s development and credit worthiness and dearly cost its members", saying that supporters of the bank's independence from international markets only use "rhetoric arguments" to defend the initiative, summarizing the effort as "another example of the populist ambition and misguided policies that have taken hold again in the region."

Nobel Prize-winning former World Bank economist Joseph Stiglitz supported the idea, stating, "One of the advantages of having a Bank of the South is that it would reflect the perspectives of those in the South.... It is a good thing to have competition in most markets, including the market for development lending."

== See also ==
- Union of South American Nations
- Bolivarian Alliance for the Americas
- SUCRE (currency of the ALBA)
- Mercosur
- Mercosur Parliament
- Pink tide
- TeleSUR
- South–South cooperation
