= X-Ray of a Lie =

Radiografía de una mentira
- Directed by: Wolfgang Schalk
- Written by: Wolfgang Schalk; Thaelman Urgelles
- Produced by: El Gusano de Luz; Wolf Productions C.A.
- Edited by: Wolfgang Schalk; Thaelman Urgelles
- Distributed by: Wolfproductions C.A.
- Release date: 2004
- Running time: 80 min
- Country: Venezuela
- Languages: Spanish; English

X-Ray of a Lie (Spanish: Radiografía de una mentira) is a 2004 documentary film examining another film, The Revolution Will Not Be Televised, about the events of the Llaguno Overpass events, before the 2002 Venezuelan coup attempt. The X-Ray documentary, directed by Wolfgang Schalk and written by Schalk and Thaelman Urgelles, accuses Kim Bartley and Donacha O'Briain of omissions and distortion in The Revolution Will Not Be Televised. It premiered on DVD in Venezuela in July 2004.

== Background ==
X-Ray of a Lie was produced from the efforts of Wolfgang Schalk and Thaelman Urgelles, Venezuelan TV producers and engineers, as a response to the film The Revolution Will Not Be Televised. Schalk, with twenty years of experience in the industry, investigated the Revolution film over five months, and said he had discovered "one lie after another". When, he said, "it became clear that the producers had 'changed the order of the events to fit a story that appeals to audiences'", he organized an October 2003 cinematic conference that included a general, media representatives, and the chief of police to discuss and analyze the film. Schalk complained that The Revolution Will Not Be Televised "did not meet the ethical standards of the BBC" and an internet petition documenting complaints about the film was circulated. Schalk said the main faults were editing to take events out of order, distortion of the events at Puente Llaguno, and others. Before making X-Ray, Schalk denounced The Revolution Will Not Be Televised, stating that it was a violation of ethical codes and a work of propaganda.

Schalk writes, "The Revolution Will Not Be Televised is a propaganda film designed to distort the Venezuelan reality. Its authors used the good faith and patronage of recognized European TV Corporations as the BBC, RTE, ZDF, NPS/Cobo, Arte and YLE. X Rays of a lie shows the grave omissions, informative bias and direct lies of the film."

Urgelles and Schalk argue that The Revolution Will Not Be Televised ignores or misrepresents important details, including:

1. Gunmen: the Puente Llaguno gunmen shot marchers. The documentary says they fired into the air, based on images taken at a different time.
2. Tank mobilization: tanks went to the presidential palace to protect the president. The documentary says they went to oust the president.
3. Private television signals: the government took down the signals of RCTV, Venevisión and Televén on 11 April. This is omitted from the film.
4. Chávez resignation announcement: General Lucas Rincón announced to the nation on television that the military had requested Chávez's resignation and he had accepted. This is omitted from the film. Lucas Rincón later became Interior Minister for the Chávez administration.
5. State television: VTV personnel left the facility peacefully. The documentary says the facility was overtaken and the signal disrupted.
6. Metropolitan Police: the police did not repress citizens during Carmona's interim presidency. The film distorts the reality with manipulated editing.
7. Private television attacked: private TV stations were attacked by government supporters. The documentary says the channels had decided not to broadcast information about Chávez's return to power.

Phil Gunson, writing in the Columbia Journalism Review, says of The Revolution Will Not Be Televised: "they omit key facts, invent others, twist the sequence of events to support their case, and replace inconvenient images with others dredged from archives". Gunson writes that: "While the shooting was going on, Chávez commandeered all radio and TV frequencies for a speech that lasted almost two hours. He had used this prerogative up to seventeen times during the previous day. When private TV channels split the screen during his speeches to show the accompanying violence, the president ordered the National Guard to shut them down. None of this is featured in [The Revolution Will Not Be Televised], which wrongly claims that state TV (VTV) was 'the only channel to which he had access.' Later that evening, VTV went off the air after its staff deserted. The film implies that it was taken over by coup-plotters, and even fabricates a sequence in which the TV screen goes blank during a government legislator's interview. ... A group of senior officers ... is presented in the film as if they were the high command. Their leader, Vice-Admiral Hector Ramirez Perez, is identified as the head of the navy. He was not. With one solitary exception, these generals and admirals had not 'fled abroad' ... as the film claims. ... the directors omit all mention of an announcement by General Rincon that Chávez had resigned, later calling it 'supplementary to the main, key fact of the story'."

== Reception ==
Brian A. Nelson, who wrote The Silence and the Scorpion: The Coup Against Chavez and the Making of Modern Venezuela, says X-Ray of a Lie includes a "blow-by-blow of [The Revolution's] manipulations". Nelson says Baralt Avenue was not empty as the film portrays, "so the filmmakers put a black bar at the top of the frame to hide the Metropolitan Police trucks that were still there", among other manipulations.

Venezuela's El Universal said in 2004 the ethics of The Revolution Will Not Be Televised winning international acclaim for the government version of events should be examined, and says the film has "conceptual errors, manipulated editing, omission of crucial information, half lies and pure lies" and that X-ray of a Lie deconstructs these inaccuracies.

A C Clark, a pseudonymous author who has expressed anti-Chavez sentiment in the book The Revolutionary Has No Clothes: Hugo Chavez's Bolivarian Farce, says the film accurately uncovers the "mendacity and tendentiousness of The Revolution Will Not Be Televised". Variety says The Revolution Will Not be Televised is a "pro-Chavist docu", adding that X-Ray of a Lie, "exposes the manipulation behind The Revolution".

According to Human Rights Watch, the Venezuelan government "allegations have never been examined in court", and the X-Ray documentary accuses Bartley and O'Briain of "omissions and distortion".

Bartley and Ó Briain say that it is "not insignificant that Schalk has led the well-resourced campaign, linked to [the opposition], to discredit and suppress [the film]".

== See also ==
- Puente Llaguno: Claves de una Masacre
