= Military career of Hugo Chávez =

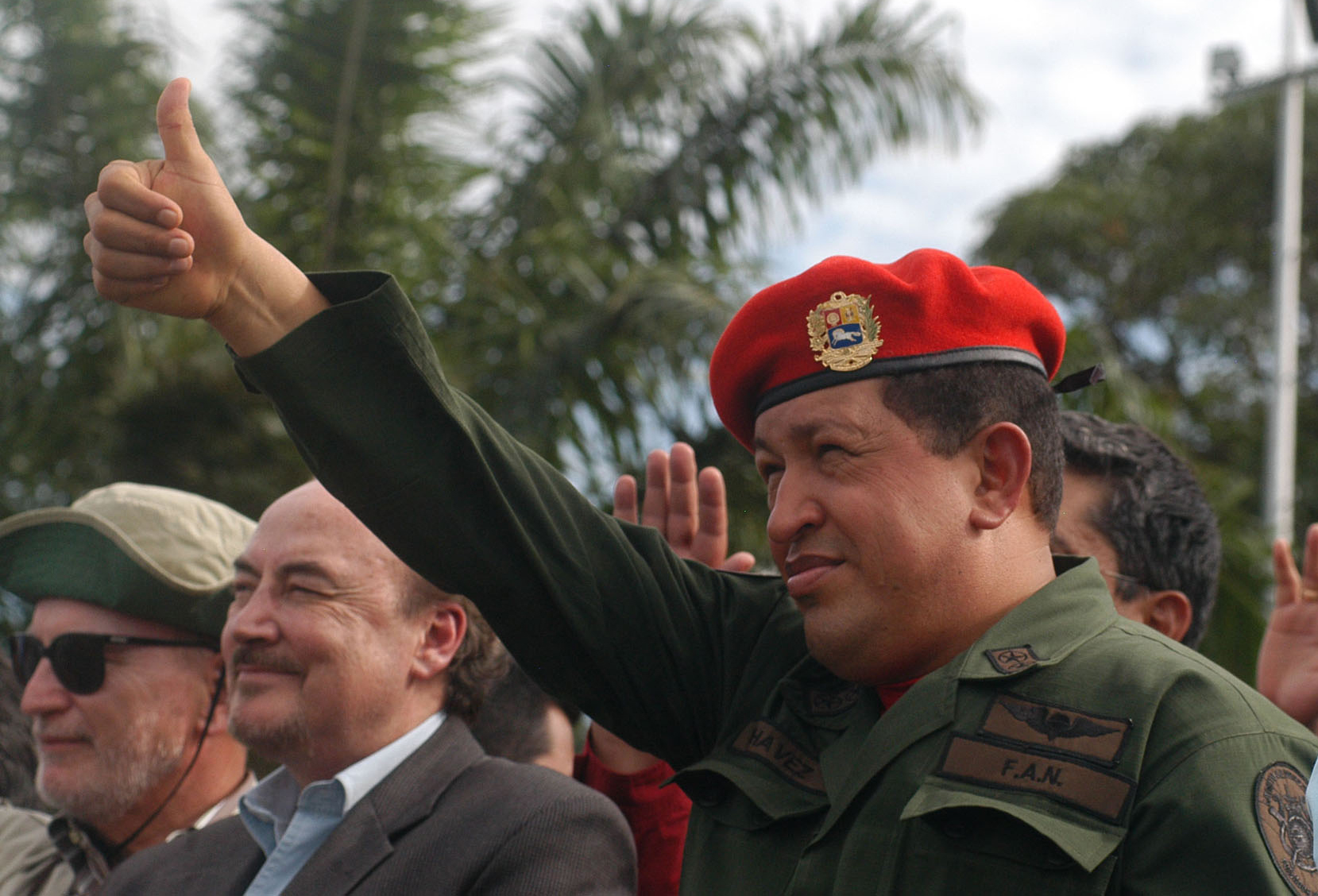
Chavez in uniform, 2010

The military career of Hugo Chávez spans the seventeen years (1975–1992) that the later President of Venezuela spent in the Venezuelan army.

Born 28 July 1954 in rural Sabaneta, Chávez entered military service upon his graduation from the Military academy of Venezuela in 1975, as a military officer. Chávez thereafter held a variety of post, command, and staff positions. At the time, he was increasingly drawn into leftist political movements. Chávez led a 1992 civilian-military coup which sought to overthrow the elected government of Carlos Andrés Pérez. Although the coup ultimately failed—ending Chávez's military career—it also brought Chávez into the national spotlight and set the stage for his future rise to political power; he eventually engaged in electioneering and political campaigning.

== Early military career (1975–1982) ==
After his undergraduate studies concluded in 1975, Chávez entered active-duty military service. Chávez's first assignment was as commander of a communications platoon attached to a counter-insurgency force—the Manuel Cedeño Mountain Infantry Battalion, headquartered in Barinas and Cumaná. In 1976, it was tasked with suppressing a guerilla insurgency staged by the Hoxhaist Partido Bandera Roja (Red Flag Party). Despite this, Chávez saw little actual combat; this was due to a low density of insurgent activity in the Cumaná region. Later, in 1977, Chávez was appointed as a communications officer at the Center of Tactical Operations in San Mateo; it was here that Chávez first received first-hand and hands-on experience in counter-insurgency tactics. Chávez later recalled that, during these years, he experienced growing sympathy for the waning guerilla movements—the very groups he was tasked with countering. He harbored a growing dislike of what he viewed as corruption among the military hierarchy. He perceived such problems as a direct result of political corruption.

At the age of 23, Chávez married Nancy Colmenares. Colmenares, like Chávez, was also from Barinas and had roots in Venezuela's plains culture. Colmenares' friends gossiped that she was already pregnant with their first daughter before they were married in 1977. Thereafter, Chávez began to lead a "double life": while feigning disciplined obedience amidst his military superiors and miming political neutrality around his family, Chávez engaged in secret trysts with social democrats, socialists, communists, and other leftists.

From 1978 through 1979, Chávez was commander and squad leader of the 414th Apure Braves AMX-30 armored battalion in Maracay. (The unit's anthem, Fatherland Beloved by Venezuelan composer Heriberto Maluenga, the then battalion military band conductor when he served with the battalion, was the one song he sang during his 8 December 2012 final TV address to the nation.) Chávez received promotions in rapid succession, and was eventually appointed company commander and head of the Department of Physical Education at the Military Academy of Venezuela, remaining in that position from 1980 to 1981. He then headed the Department of Culture at the academy in 1982. Chávez was also a founding commander of the José Antonio Páez Company at the academy from 1983 to 1984. At the time, Chávez gained recognition for his lectures at Caracas's war college, in which he spoke for hours in a "folksy" manner that captivated supporters in his audiences. Chávez's interest in Venezuelan politics only grew throughout his career in the military.

Chávez received several decorations: the Star of Carabobo (Estrella de Carabobo); the Land Forces Cross (Cruz de las Fuerzas Terrestres); and was awarded the Military Order of Francisco de Miranda, the Order of Rafael Urdaneta, and the Order of the Liberator, 5th Class (Military Division). Chávez continued playing baseball and softball: he went to the 1976 National Baseball Championships, held in Barinas; and he played in military baseball tournaments, among the most important of which were those held in Cumaná in 1977 and the Dominican Republic in 1980. Apart from his writing, Chávez sculpted, producing such works as the 1980 Sombra de Guerra en el Golfo ("Shadows of War in the Gulf").

== Premonitions of a military-civilian coup (1982–1989) ==
Chávez's first attempt at launching a political movement came in 1977, when he formed the Ejército de Liberación del Pueblo de Venezuela, or ELPV—the "Liberation Army of the Venezuelan People". Years later, he recalled that the ELPV's purpose was to "prepare ourselves in case something should happen" and that it was "an important pointer to the future". In 1978, dressed in his army fatigues, Chávez met then-presidential candidate José Vicente Rangel—who later became Chávez's vice-president—and subsequently aided him in affixing election materials in Maracay. Chávez risked expulsion from the military had his superiors found out about such leftist political activities. Under Venezuelan law at the time, military officers and other personnel were forbidden from involving themselves in political affairs of any sort. Moreover, engaging in such illicit activities while dressed in fatigues or in uniform was punishable by even harsher penalties.

It was not until the period 1982–1983 that Chávez seriously began to plot the overthrow of Venezuela's elected civilian leaders. On 17 December 1982, Chávez and his co-conspirators gathered under a large tree at Samán de Güere. There, they solemnly witnessed each other's repetition of a revised version of the oath Simon Bolivar undertook while upon Italy's Monte Sacro, this time adding Ezequiel Zamora's slogan during the Federal War:

"Juro por el Dios de mis padres, juro por mi patria, juro por mi honor que no daré tranquilidad a mi alma ni descanso a mi brazo hasta no ver rotas las cadenas que oprimen a mi pueblo por voluntad de los poderosos. Elección popular, tierras y hombres libres, horror a la oligarquía."

"I swear by the God of my fathers, I swear by my nation, and I swear by my honor that my arm will not relax, nor my soul to rest, until I have broken the chains that oppress my people through the will of the powerful. Free elections, free lands and free men, horror to the oligarchy."

On 24 July 1983, Chávez—along with peers from his days at the military academy—launched the Ejército Revolucionario Bolivariano (EBR-200—"Revolutionary Bolivarian Army"). The "200" in EBR-200's name derives from the movement's founding on the 200th anniversary of Simón Bolívar's birth. The movement established as its political goal the realization of "Bolivarianism" by means of a "Bolivarian Revolution". Chávez continued to play baseball in the military leagues. Indeed, he progressed with his team to the University League Championships, which were held in Caracas between 1984 and 1985. Chávez wrote collections of stories and poems, including Vuelvan Caras, Mauricio and El Genio y el Centauro ("The Genius and the Centaur"). El Genio y el Centauro garnered him 3rd prize at a 1987 competition held in the Teatro Histórico Nacional ("National Historical Theater") in Cañafístola. One of his poems honored the late Felipe Acosta Carles, a co-founder of the EBR-200.

In March 1986, the EBR-200 held its third congress in San Cristobal, close to Venezuela's frontier with war-torn Colombia. The EBR-200's inner circle came together for the secret meeting. Nine people attended, including six military personnel (including Chávez) and three civilians. Chávez's then-collaborator, Francisco Arias Cardenas (who, twelve years later, would lose the 2000 presidential election to Chávez) attended. Also in attendance was one of Chávez's uncles. Only one woman attended: Herma Marksman, who by then had become Chávez's mistress. Chávez's own wife and children remained alone in Sabaneta during these years. The attendees sought ways to attain power through a civilian-military power grab, a common method of power seizure in much of South and Latin America's history. Marksman played a crucial role in both Chávez's political and personal lives. Upfront, Chávez told Marksman that he would never marry her. Chávez stated that this stemmed from his mother's refusal to allow him to divorce Nancy. Nevertheless, he told Marksman that she was needed in his life. Thus, for nine years, Marksman would aid Chávez's plans by ferrying and delivering messages for him across the country. She performed various other tasks: placing phone calls and taking notes at meetings.

Leaders of the extreme left movement La Causa R—such as founder Alfredo Maneira (just prior to his 1983 death) and leader Pablo Medina—held meetings with Chávez. Medina recounts that during their meetings Chávez always came across as a jovial person. This was despite recollections of his taciturn demeanor. Medina recalled that Chávez did not articulate his own opinions. Rather, he appeared as a "sponge" via his absorption of vast amounts of information. In this regard, Chávez always reportedly requested a hard copy of all documents he was shown. Nothing of substance came of these initial contacts. Chávez, then a lieutenant, was stationed as commander of a motorized army division—the Francisco Farfán Cavalry Unit—in remote Elorza, Apure between 1985 and 1986. Elorza itself was situated twelve hours due south (by local bus) from Barinas and towards the vast Venezuelan interior. The distance from his previous acquaintances (including his brother Adán and numerous leftist associates) meant that Chávez had much less opportunity to plan for his desired insurrection. By 1987, Chávez and Arias were seen by associates as the clear leaders of the EBR-200. They together determined that it would be most opportune to launch their coup attempt halfway through the next president's term (they were not concerned about who won the presidential election). They reasoned that it was typically at mid-term that the President and his administration polled their lowest popularity levels.

Later, Chávez commanded the Civilian-Military Development Nucleus at the Arauca-Meta border between 1986 and 1988. There, Chávez took advantage of his authority by implementing experimental civilian-military programs. In these programs, he organized such military aid efforts directed at the surrounding population as socioeconomic development initiatives, historical re-enactments and pageants, and oral history documentation efforts. Chávez was also in charge of all patron saints' feasts held in Elorza, Apure between 1987 and 1988. Chávez realized that such projects would be essential in order to effectively allow Latin America to regain an autonomous cultural identity independent of U.S. "cultural imperialism". Yet, in 1988, Chávez was seconded to the Miraflores presidential palace; there, he was appointed assistant head of the National Security and Defense Council by Democratic Action President Jaime Lusinchi. The post would see Chávez sent off briefly to Central America on official business; he would remain at the post until 1989.

== Reaction to the Caracazo (1989) ==
Throughout Chávez's early life, Venezuela had enjoyed a period of economic and democratic stability that was remarkable in South America at the time. This stability was partly based on Venezuela's massive foreign exchange earnings gained from petroleum exports. Venezuelans referred to their society as Venezuela Saudíta ("Saudi Venezuela"—a reference of Saudi Arabia's heavily modernized and oil-based economy). When Saudi Arabia itself and other United States-aligned oil producers significantly raised their production output—in an attempt to bring about economic implosion in the heavily oil-dependent Soviet Union—a global oil glut ensued. Oil prices collapsed to historic lows, and Venezuelan oil earnings, and economic and social stability in general, were suddenly imperiled: in the 1980s, per-capita gross domestic product (GDP) fell by more than 20%, and by 1989 real wages fell to a third of their previous levels. The nation also faced a dire balance of payments crisis.

Responding to this, in 1989 the Carlos Andrés Pérez administration enacted sweeping and ambitious IMF-inspired neoliberal structural adjustment programs. Nevertheless, these reforms were widely unpopular among poor and working class Venezuelans. Such measures involved the removal of state-managed development and industrialization, the implementation of market liberalization measures, enactment of export subsidies and incentives, extensive privatization of state-owned holdings, curtailed social spending, the release of longstanding price controls on many goods, as well as liberalization of capital and liquidity flows into and out of Venezuela. The programs' international backers—including renowned Harvard economist Jeffrey Sachs—as well as domestic business groups such as Grupo Roraima thereby sought to restore fiscal stability and responsibility to Venezuela's ailing economy. These policies yielded mixed social and economic results. In 1991 and 1992, Venezuela experienced GDP growth rates of 10.3% and 7%, respectively. Such remarkable results resulted mainly from Pérez's drive to increase investments in the oil industry.

Yet, other indicators suffered. Sharp declines in measures of human well-being exacerbated a growing social crisis. Much hardship was thus generated among Venezuela's poor majority. Incidences of hunger, prostitution, murder, and other ills rose sharply, while continuing surges in Venezuela's national debt and flagging foreign direct investment inflows continued to hammer the Venezuelan economy. Further, the neoliberal reforms failed to lower high poverty rates of the 1990s. This continuing poverty complemented Latin American economies' general skewing towards satiating elite consumptive interests while simultaneously relieving upper classes from substantial taxes that would subsidize the poor.

Discontent with the general socioeconomic decline erupted in the tumultuous 27 February 1989 Caracazo riots; they were the most destructive and deadly such disturbances in Venezuelan history, (2005). Officially, 372 deaths occurred—although some critics of the government claim that the actual total is well in excess of two thousand. Outraged mobs engaged in mass arson against whole city blocks. Several days passed before troops restored full order. At the time, Chávez was ill. Thus, he was not ordered to help suppress the riots that were breaking out in primarily poor neighborhoods. Yet, Chávez recalls observing the unfolding events—and realizing that he had missed his "strategic minute" to launch his coup. Thus unable for the moment to capitalize on the popular anger and unrest, Chávez refined his critique of what he saw as an irredeemably corrupt traditional two-party puntofijismo system. Subsequently, Chávez's political rhetoric would dramatically mature; after these Caracazo riots, Chávez always chose to refer to the type of neoliberalism practiced by Pérez as so-called "savage" neoliberalism. He saw such economic reform packages—including the ten-point "Washington Consensus" reform program advanced by former International Monetary Fund advisor John Williamson—as forcibly imposed upon the unwilling populations of Latin America by the U.S. government and allied leaders. In response, Chávez intensified preparations for the Bolivarian military-civilian coup.

== Final coup preparations (1989–1992) ==
Weeks after the Caracazo, Chávez returned to work at Miraflores. Chávez recalled that the presidential palace's guards stopped and questioned him. They reportedly asked him: "[l]ook here, major, is it true about the Bolivarian Movement? We'd like to hear more about it; we're not prepared to go on killing people". Chávez took this as a sign that his plan to overthrow the government was gaining momentum. By late 1989, the first civilians joined the EBR-200's ranks. The EBR-200 thus changed its name to the Movimiento Bolivariano Revolucionario-200 (MBR-200—the "Revolutionary Bolivarian Movement-200"). The supplanting of the word "Army" (Ejército) with "Movement" (Movimiento) was intended to punctuate this shift. However, on 6 December 1989, Chávez along with other senior officers were abruptly arrested. They were brought before army command on charges of plotting a coup that was suspected by the government as planned for Christmas Day. They were accused of planning the assassination of high government officials, including President Pérez. Yet the officers were eventually released—due to lack of evidence. The government was reluctant to prosecute officers who were recognized in the military as among the best in their respective armed services. Nevertheless, all—including Chávez—were thereafter sent to posts far from the federal government in Caracas. Chávez was sent in 1990 to Maturín, where he was appointed the official in charge of civilian matters with the Ranger Brigade headquartered in the area. Chávez was later allowed to matriculate at the Universidad Simón Bolívar ("Simón Bolívar University") in Caracas, where he did graduate work in political science. He left without a degree. Chávez took courses until August 1991.

Chávez re-entered military service with an initial re-posting to Cumaná, where a desk job awaited him. Chávez recalled feeling that such a seemingly dull and minor posting was beneath him. Thereafter, from 1991 to 4 February 1992, Chávez was again given his own command—the Maracay-based Colonel Antonio Nicolas Briceño 421st Airborne Battalion, 42nd Airborne Brigade, of the Venezuelan Army's 4th Armored Division (then the 4th Infantry Division). Such troops proved key in facilitating Chávez's various political ambitions. Chávez received the job when the battalion's former commander retired from the army; Chávez was his replacement as commanding officer. With a posting in Maracay, a city that is relatively near the national power structures in Caracas, Chávez's coup plans were no longer hindered by his own geographic isolation. Later, reports emerged of a dossier detailing all of Chávez's subversive activities. It had been produced just prior to Chávez's new Maracay posting—yet, the document was ignored by military intelligence. The major who had compiled it was ordered to undergo psychiatric evaluation.

By 1991, Chávez and other MBR-200 leaders activated the coup plan codenamed after one of Chávez's heroes, Ezequiel Zamora—Plan Zamora. Yet despite planning for the coup's execution, Chávez and other MBR-200 leaders made precious little plans about what their putative future rebel government would do after the rebellion. Their future governing structure thus remained vague until the end of 1991, when Chávez and others decided to delineate an initial legal framework for their government's operation. Several assorted coup dates were proposed by Chávez's associates. Indeed, many junior captains threatened to launch their own early coup, which would be independent of that waged by their higher ranked commanders. They threatened this action if Chávez refused to pick a date that they considered soon enough. Yet Chávez refused to budge on a December 1991 attempt. He stated that nothing was to be attempted without his involvement. The captains thus waited for Chávez's chosen date. Yet one aspect of the planned coup remained clear throughout: Chávez's demand that it maintain a primarily military focus and character. The leftist ex-guerrilla leader Douglas Bravo—who fought in the 1960s and 1970s—also regularly met Chávez. These meetings took place during the years leading up to the coup and without the knowledge of other key MBR-200 officers. Bravo recounted that Chávez did not trust civilians enough to afford them a role in his bloody intrigue. According to him, it was for this reason that what was initially planned as a civilian-military rebellion was pared down by Chávez to one fought solely by soldiers; Bravo and his leftist civilian cohorts were turfed out of logistical considerations, preparations, and planning just days before the coup.

Yet, towards the end of January 1992, Chávez realized that the Movement's window of opportunity was to close. Chávez received notification that he faced imminent transferral on 14 February—to a small village on the frontier with war-ravaged Colombia. Chávez realized that this posting would jeopardize his participation in the MBR-200 coup, as the town was far from the major cities and power centers of Venezuela's northern coastal strip. Alarmed at this prospect, Chávez and other Movement members held one final meeting. There, they determined to act before Chávez's transfer. They would quicken preparations and wait until President Pérez—who was just then abroad on a trip to the 1992 World Economic Forum, held in Switzerland—returned to Venezuela. All the while, MBR-200 rebel forces built up their numbers. Eventually, 5 lieutenant colonels, 14 majors, 54 captains, 67 first and second lieutenants, 65 warrant officers and technical non-commissioned personnel, 101 sergeants and senior non-commissioned officers and 2,056 corporals and enlisted servicemen were involved in the conspiracy; thus Chávez and other rebel commanders had 2,367 military personnel from 10 army battalions to rely upon. They set a final date for their coup: Tuesday, 4 February 1992.
