= Larry Rohter =

American journalist

William Lawrence Rohter, Jr.
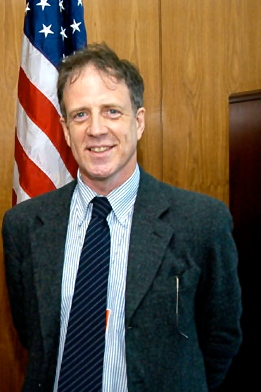
- Rohter at U.S. Embassy Montevideo in 2006.
- Born: February 3, 1950 (age 76); Oak Park, Illinois, United States
- Education: Georgetown University School of Foreign Service, Columbia University
- Occupation: Journalist
- Organization(s): The New York Times; Newsweek
- Spouse: Clothilde Rohter
- Awards: Maria Moors Cabot Prize, Brazilian Embratel Prize

William Lawrence Rohter, Jr. (born February 3, 1950), known as Larry Rohter, is an American journalist who was a South American bureau chief (based in Rio de Janeiro, Brazil) for The New York Times from 1999 to 2007. Previously, he was Caribbean and Latin American correspondent of the Times from 1994 to 1999. He now writes about cultural topics.

== Awards ==
In 1998, Rohter was awarded the Maria Moors Cabot Prize at Columbia University. He was also awarded the Brazilian Embratel prize, as the "Melhor correspondente estrangeiro" (best foreign correspondent).

== Personal ==
Rohter is married to Clotilde Rohter. They have 2 children. He lives today in Hoboken, New Jersey".

== Criticism ==
Rohter published an article titled "Brazilian Leader's Tippling Becomes National Concern", insinuating the Brazilian president Luiz Inácio Lula da Silva had a drinking problem that affected his presidency, citing Mr. da Silva's former running mate Leonel Brizola, among others. The article caused consternation in the Brazilian press. Rohter's visa was temporarily revoked (and quickly reinstated) by Brazil's government, an event which overshadowed much criticism of Rohter's reporting.

== Publications ==
- Rohter, Larry (2007). Deu no New York Times: o Brasil segundo a ótica de um repórter do jornal mais influente do mundo. Rio de Janeiro, RJ: Objetiva. ISBN 978-8573029277.
- Rohter, Larry (2012). Brazil on the Rise: The Story of a Country Transformed (1st Palgrave Macmillan pbk. ed.). Basingstoke: Palgrave Macmillan. ISBN 978-0230120730.
- Rohter, Larry (2023). Into the Amazon: The Life of Cândido Rondon, Trailblazing Explorer, Scientist, Statesman, and Conservationist. New York, NY, W.W. Norton & Company. ISBN 978-1-324-02126-1
