= Lucas Rincón =

Venezuelan military officer

- Born: Lucas Rincón Romero; 1 February 1950 (age 76); La Cañada de Urdaneta, Zulia, Venezuela
- Military career
- Allegiance: National Bolivarian Armed Forces of Venezuela
- Service years: 1972–
- Rank: General in Chief
- Commands: Minister of Defense (April–July 2002); Minister of Interior and Justice (2003–2004)
- Other work: Ambassador of Venezuela to Portugal (2006–)

Lucas Rincón Romero (born 1 February 1950) is a Venezuelan military officer.

== Career ==
Lucas Rincón was the highest-ranking Venezuelan military officer at the time of the 2002 coup d'état attempt against Venezuelan President Hugo Chávez. He announced in a television broadcast that Chávez had resigned, "se le solicitó al señor presidente la renuncia de su cargo, la cual aceptó" (the president was asked to resign his post, which he accepted). He had been one of Chavez's most loyal military officers.

Chávez was returned to power within three days and there has since been debate as to whether the resignation was genuine. Chávez said in a BBC interview in October 2005 that media reports that announced that he had renounced his position were false.

Rincón went on to become the Minister of Interior and Justice from January 2003 to September 2004. Since 2006, he serves as the Ambassador of Venezuela to Portugal.
