= 2004 Venezuelan protests =

- Part of Protests against Hugo Chávez
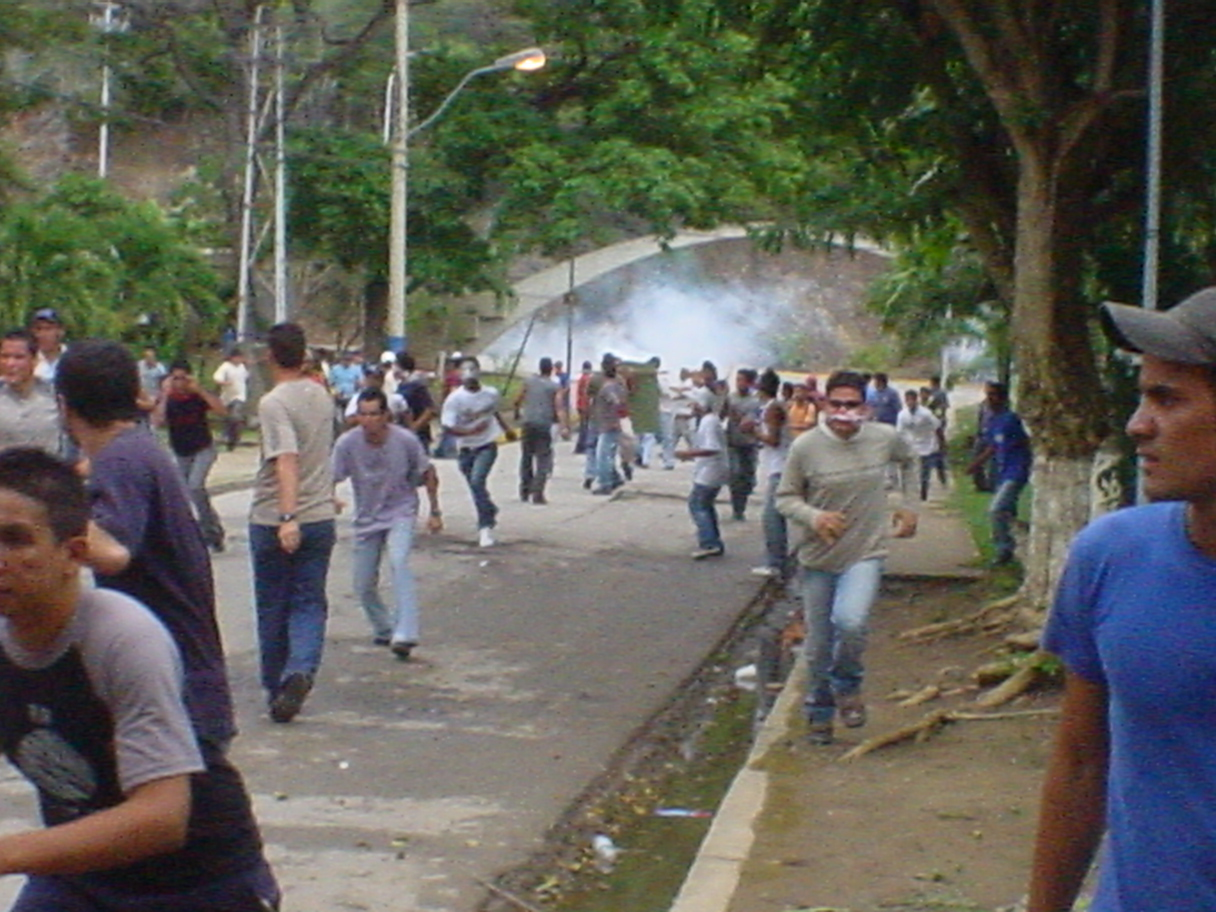
- Protests at the Universidad de Oriente Nueva Esparta campus in March 2004
- Date: 27 February 2004 – 2 March 2004 (5 days)
- Location: Venezuela
- Caused by: Invalidation of signatures to call for a recall referendum
- Goals: 2004 recall referendum
- Result: Suspension of firearms open carry Resignation of ambassador Milos Alcalay

Parties
Coordinadora Democrática; Venezuelan opposition	Government of Venezuela

Number
Opposition demonstrators	Venezuelan National Guard; Bolivarian Circles

Casualties
- Deaths: 9+
- Injuries: Hundreds
- Arrested: 300+

A series of anti-government protests took place in Venezuela in the context of the 2004 Venezuelan recall referendum, starting on 27 February 2004. Negotiations between the opposition and government agreeing on signatures led to the end of the protests. During the protests, nine people were killed, of which at least four were due to the response of security officials, hundreds were injured and 300 were arrested.

== Protests ==
The protests began on 27 February 2004, lasted five consecutive days and took place mainly in middle and upper-class neighborhoods of Caracas and fifteen other cities of the country. The demonstrations sought to protest against the decisions of the National Electoral Council after it announced that the signatures presented to request the recall referendum had to be examined a second time, and were initially promoted by the Bloque Democrático (Democratic Block), a radical sector of the Venezuelan opposition that rejected the recall referendum as "a trap of the regime".

Barricades were erected near homes, with garbage and fire, and remaining present as long as no security forces or pro-government supporters arrived. In many places, the barricades did not generate confrontation with security officials or related entities and generated violence; however, in some cases demonstrators confronted government or pro-government forces, destroyed public property, and used firearms. In its 2004 annual report, non-governmental organization PROVEA registered that 27 out of 370 street closures between October 2003 and September 2004 resulted in violence, although it acknowledged that there was a significant underreporting of these. Around one out of every three demonstrations in that period were characterized by barricades.

The state response was varied. While the security forces dependent on opposition mayoralties (including the Metropolitan Police of Caracas, the municipal police of Baruta and the municipal police of Chacao) refrained from responding to the protesters and in some cases even helped to erect barricades, bodies dependent on the national government (particularly the National Guard) responded to contain and repress the demonstrators. Such actions also varied depending on the time and place. On some occasions, the action was in accordance with the law, while on others it was outside of it: multiple protesters were beaten, injured or arbitrarily detained.

Negotiations between the opposition and government agreeing on signatures led to the end of the protests. During the protests, nine people were killed, of which at least four were due to the response of security officials, hundreds were injured and 300 were arrested.

== See also ==
- 2007 Venezuelan RCTV protests
- 2007 Venezuelan referendum protests
- Llaguno Overpass events
- Plaza Altamira military
- Tascón List
- Venezuelan general strike of 2002–2003
