= Venezuelan crisis defection =

Defections during the 2019 crisis in Venezuela

Defections from the Bolivarian Revolution occurred under the administrations of Presidents Hugo Chávez and Nicolás Maduro. The 2019 Venezuelan presidential crisis concerning who is the legitimate President of Venezuela has been underway since 10 January 2019, when the opposition-majority National Assembly declared that incumbent Nicolás Maduro's 2018 reelection was invalid and the body declared its president, Juan Guaidó, to be acting president of the nation. Guaidó encouraged military personnel and security officials to withdraw support from Maduro, and offered an amnesty law, approved by the National Assembly, for military personnel and authorities who help to restore constitutional order.

Maduro's government states that the crisis is a "coup d'état led by the United States to topple him and control the country's oil reserves." Guaidó denies the coup allegations, saying peaceful volunteers back his movement. As of March 2019, Guaidó has been recognized as the interim president of Venezuela by 54 countries, "including the US and most Latin American and European countries".

Several top military figures recognized Guaidó, and hundreds of military personnel have defected to Colombia, but top military command has not broken ranks with Maduro as of mid-April 2019. Following the 23 January events, some Venezuelan diplomats in the United States supported Guaidó; the majority returned to Venezuela on Maduro's orders.

== Prior to 2019 presidential crisis ==
Defections occurred before the 2019 Venezuelan presidential crisis.

=== Chávez presidency ===
In 2007, Defense Minister Raúl Baduel publicly broke with Chavez and announced his opposition to the constitutional changes proposed in the 2007 constitutional referendum. Baduel became a "prominent voice of dissent", concerned that Chávez was taking Venezuela down an authoritarian "road to ruin". He became the highest-ranking military person opposed to Chavez's constitutional changes that would "concentrate power in the executive".

In October 2008, a military prosecutor claimed there had been financial irregularities, amounting to US$14 million, during Baduel's tenure as Defense Minister. The New York Times stated, "Chávez has moved against a wide range of domestic critics, and his efforts in recent weeks to strengthen his grip on the armed forces have led to high-profile arrests and a wave of reassignments." In 2009, Baduel was arrested; he said that his arrest was politically motivated, with Chávez allies admitting same in private. He was imprisoned, and according to The Guardian, said "his crime was to realise—and declare—that the president was a tyrant". The 2009 Human Rights Watch report mentions Baduel as an example of political persecution.

In May 2010, Baduel was convicted by a military court of corruption and sentenced to seven years and eleven months in prison; Baduel says he is innocent. He was released in 2015.

=== Maduro presidency ===
In December 2014, security official Leamsy Salazar defected to the United States after communicating with the US Drug Enforcement Administration for about two months about Diosdado Cabello's alleged involvement with international drug trade. Salazar claimed that Cabello headed the Cartel of the Suns, a military drug trafficking organization in Venezuela; he fled to the US and was placed in witness protection. After Salazar defected, he said that the date that Hugo Chávez died as stated by the Venezuelan government was wrong. Based on information from Salazar, ambassador to the Organization of American States, Guillermo Cochez, stated that Chávez died on 30 December 2012, contrasting the 5 March 2013 date given by Maduro. The date of Chávez's death is controversial since laws were passed in his name after the date Salazar stated he was to have died.

==== 2017 constitutional crisis ====
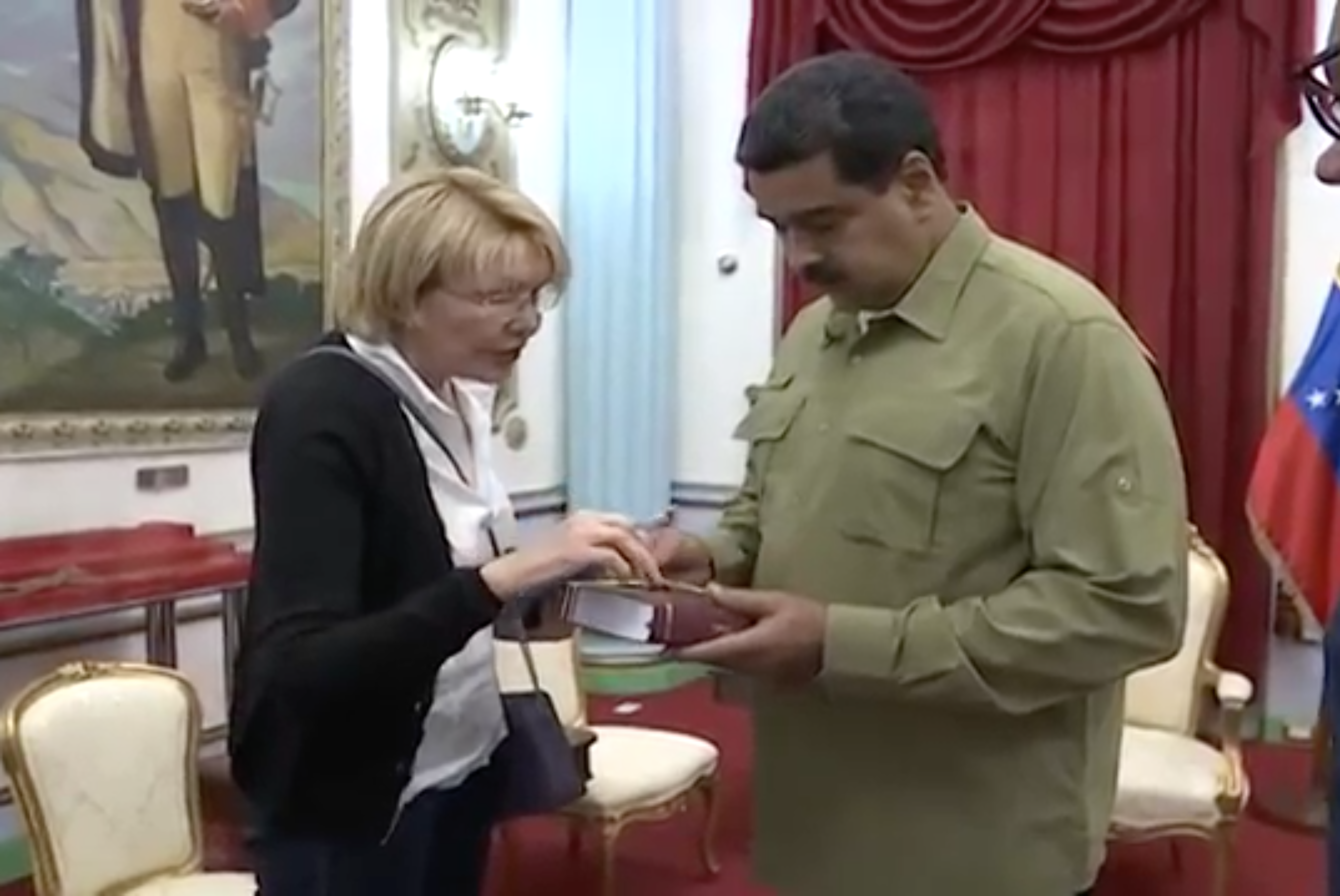
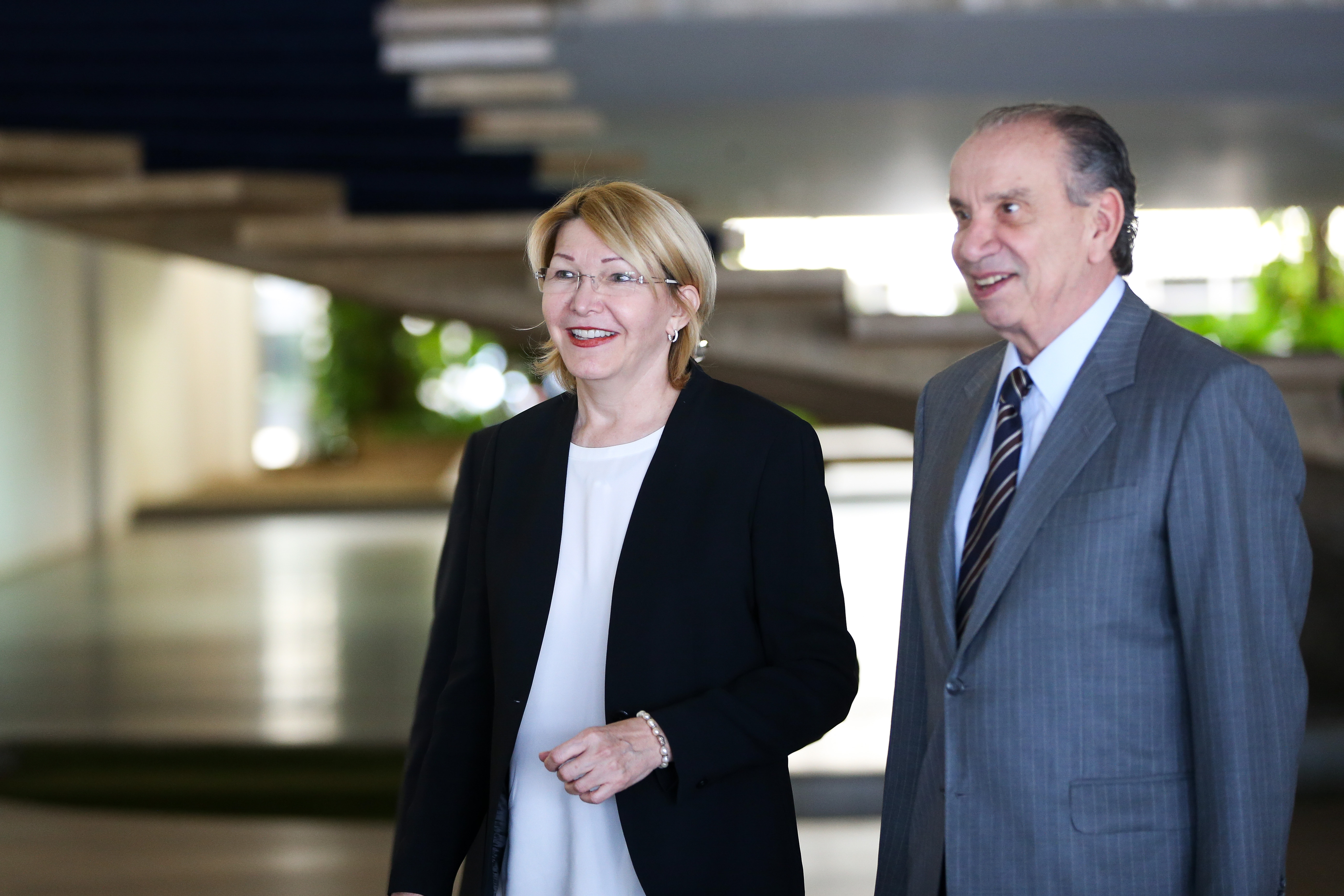
top: Luisa Ortega Diaz with Maduro in 2017;
bottom: Ortega Díaz with Aloysio Nunes in 2017

On 12 January 2017, Rául Baduel was re-arrested on allegations that he was plotting to overthrow the government. Multiple other opposition politicians were detained in what opposition politicians called trumped up charges.

In 2017, Attorney General Luisa Ortega Díaz denounced the rupture of democracy in Venezuela when the Venezuelan Supreme Court, in a move both nationally and internationally considered a power grab, assumed powers constitutionally attributed to the National Assembly. The Supreme Court barred her from leaving the country and froze her assets, due to alleged "serious misconduct" in office, and she was dismissed as Prosecutor General by the newly established National Constitutional Assembly. Tarek William Saab, the replacement Chief Prosecutor appointed by the Constituent Assembly, claimed that she and her husband, German Ferrer, operated an extortion group and a day later, the Constituent Assembly ordered their arrest. Ferrer said the charges are political in nature. Ortega and Ferrer left Venezuela, with Ortega stating that the Maduro government would "deprive me of my life". Maduro has said he is seeking an international arrest warrant for both her and her husband, claiming they had been involved in serious crimes.

On 28 November 2017 after differences with Venezuela's government, Rafael Ramírez was fired as Venezuela's Permanent Representative to the United Nations in New York. In December, he confirmed that he had resigned from the UN post at the request of the Venezuelan president. Maduro aides presented no evidence of alleged graft during Ramírez's tenure, and critics say the president was engaged in a "purge aimed at helping the embattled leader consolidate power over the country;s lifeblood oil industry", according to the Wall Street Journal. "Once among Venezuela's most powerful politicians", Ramírez said he resigned on "pressure for expressing his opinions over how the country could overcome its crippling economic crisis".

Along with Ortega Díaz, Minister of Interior Affairs Miguel Rodríguez Torres become increasingly critical of the government in 2017. In June, he expressed his opposition to the presidential initiative to convene a National Constituent Assembly, and called instead for new elections. In 2018, Rodríguez Torres, who had spoken the previous day at an opposition rally, was arrested by SEBIN agents; the Bolivarian government stated that the general had attempted to sow discord among the Venezuelan armed forces.

== 2019 presidential crisis ==
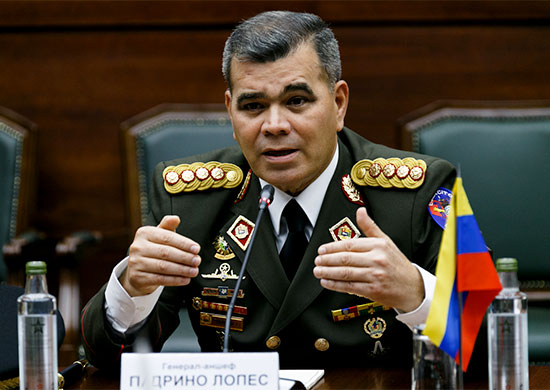
Defense Minister Vladimir Padrino López declared the armed forces would not recognize Juan Guaidó.

At the time of Maduro's second inauguration on 10 January 2019, The Washington Post reported that US intelligence had allegedly learned that Minister of Defense, Vladimir Padrino López, had requested that Maduro step down, threatening to resign if Maduro did not. On 15 January 2019, Padrino López swore loyalty to Maduro, stating that members of the National Bolivarian Armed Forces of Venezuela (FANB) "are willing to die to defend that Constitution, those people, those institutions and you as supreme magistrate, president of Venezuela".

It was also reported that though the top military swore allegiance to Maduro, many secretly supported Guaidó and had spoken to exiled and defected soldiers saying they would not suppress any uprising that could oust Maduro. Rocío San Miguel, Executive Director of Control Ciudadano and a Venezuelan attorney and human rights activist who specializes in the military, told Spanish newspaper El País that the Venezuelan National Guard had acknowledged 4,009 defections as of January 2019; she believed that because of the problem in the Armed Forces, Maduro had called for incorporating the people's militia as conscripts.

The National Assembly offered an amnesty law for military defectors. On 11 January, plans to offer incentives for the armed forces to disavow Maduro were revealed. Venezuelan political experts, like David Smilde from the Washington Office on Latin America, suggested that this action would enrage Maduro, who already called the National Assembly "traitors" for not attending his inauguration, and who might arrest or attack more of its members. A friend of Guaidó, in response, said that they were aware of the risks but believed it needed to be done to allow democracy to reappear in Venezuela.

During the 2019 Venezuelan presidential crisis, after the National Assembly declared Guaidó acting president, the Miami Herald reported that the Maduro regime feared a military uprising and defections, had made many arrests, and Padrino López ordered a counterintelligence effort to locate conspiracists or possible defectors. According to France 24, Maduro declared "military deserters who fled to Colombia have become mercenaries" as part of a US-backed coup. CBS News reported that rank-and-file troops, who made about US$6 per month, were "hungry and pushed to a tipping point".

Guaidó declared that the opposition had held secret meetings with military officials to discuss the Amnesty Law. An opposition representative stated that the meetings were focused on army officers, who were amenable to the idea and "expressed concern about the Trump administration's past threats of military intervention in Venezuela and [...] that the armed forces would be outgunned in any fight". Analysts warned that the meetings could potentially only win partial support and divide the military, which could lead to a civil war or coup.

Maduro's government stated that the positions against him were the "result of imperialism perpetrated by the United States and allies" that put Venezuela "at the centre of a world war".

=== Defectors ===
Guaidó encouraged military personnel and security officials to withdraw support from Maduro. One soldier who fled to Colombia during the 2019 shipping of humanitarian aid to Venezuela said that the majority of rank-and-file soldiers opposed Maduro, but top commanders have not broken rank with Maduro.

==== Key officials ====
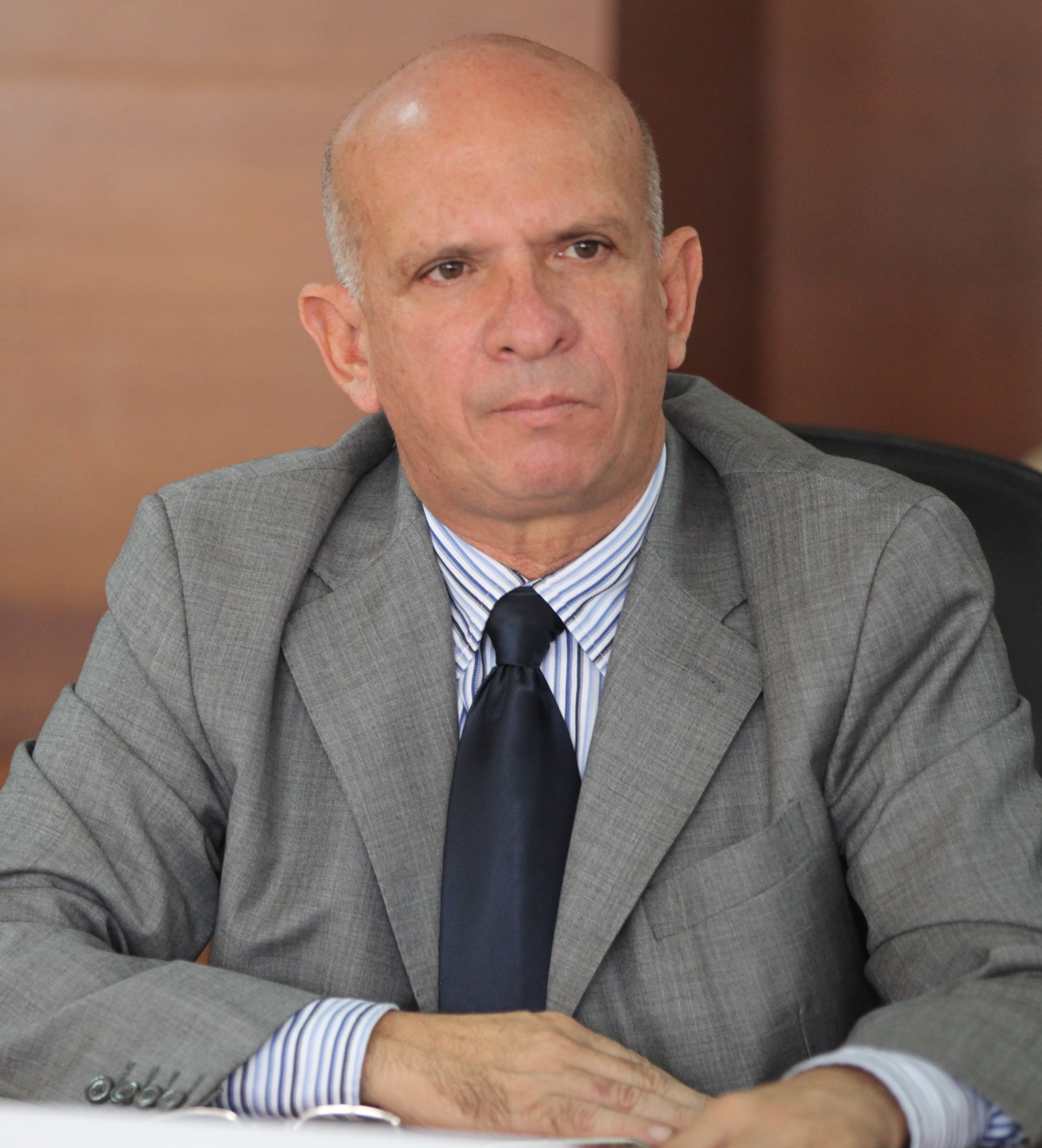
Hugo Carvajal in 2016, sanctioned by the U.S. in 2008

Signs of impending crisis showed when a Supreme Tribunal Justice and Electoral Justice seen as close to Maduro defected to the United States just a few days before the 10 January 2019 second inauguration of Nicolás Maduro. The justice, Christian Zerpa, said that Nicolás Maduro was "incompetent" and "illegitimate". According to The New York Times, he "called the May presidential election unfair and described Maduro's rule as 'a dictatorship.' He also accused Maduro of frequently taking direct orders from Cuban officials."

Hugo Carvajal, the head of Venezuela's military intelligence for ten years during Hugo Chávez's presidency and "one of the government's most prominent figures", publicly broke with Maduro in mid-February and endorsed Guaidó as acting president. Serving as a National Assembly deputy for the United Socialist Party of Venezuela, The Wall Street Journal said the retired general is considered a pro-Maduro legislator. In a video released online on 21 February, he called for Venezuelan military forces to break ranks and to allow the entry of humanitarian aid to Venezuela. Directed to soldiers he said, "we do not have the technical capacity to confront any enemy ... he who says otherwise lies." Directed to Maduro, he said, "You have killed hundreds of young people in the streets for trying to claim the rights you stole. This without even counting the dead for lack of medicines and security."

In an interview with The New York Times, Carvajal said Maduro was a "dictator with a corrupt inner circle that has engaged in drug trafficking and courted the militant group Hezbollah". Former New York Times journalist William Neuman later said that claims of Hezbollah being present in Venezuela was "in reality, minimal" and that the opposition would make such suggestions to convince the United States that it faced a threat in Venezuela. US investigators accused Carvajal as being one of those responsible for drug trafficking in Venezuela; he said Maduro himself helped corrupt top government figures manage drug trafficking in Venezuela. Carvajal also questioned the status of Venezuela's sovereignty, alleging that Cubans control the Maduro government. In March 2019, he said that Maduro orders the "spontaneous protests" in his favor abroad, and his partners finance them. Maduro expelled Carvajal from the Armed Forces on 4 April, degraded his Major General status, and accused him of treason.

Carvajal was arrested in Spain on 12 April 2019 based on an arrest warrant from the United States for 2011 drug trafficking charges; the U.S. asked Spain to extradite Carvajal.

Manuel Cristopher Figuera, the Director General of Venezuela's National Intelligence Service, SEBIN, broke with Maduro during the 2019 Venezuela uprising, saying it was time to "rebuild the country", and that scoundrels were plundering the country. Maduro announced he would reinstate Gustavo González López as the SEBIN head.

==== Military high command ====
The Venezuelan Air Force's head of strategic planning, divisional general Francisco Esteban Yánez Rodríguez, recognized Guaidó as interim president on 2 February 2019, stating: "Today, with patriotic and democratic pride, I inform you that I do not recognize the irritating and dictatorial authority of Mr. Nicolás Maduro and I recognize Deputy Juan Guaidó as the Interim President of Venezuela, for which I worthily place myself at your service". He stated that 90% of the armed forces would back Guaidó if needed.

Air Force general Víctor Romero Meléndez supported Guaidó and called upon the Armed Forces to "support the people and the constitution". Retired air force major general Jorge Oropeza recognized Guaidó as interim president.

Major General Alexis López Ramírez, who resigned his command of Venezuela's National Defense Council in 2017, recognized Guaidó as president on 23 February 2019. López Ramírez demanded respect for Venezuela's constitution, criticized the presence of Cubans in Venezuela's military, and said that command of the armed forces had been usurped by police and politicians from the United Socialist Party of Venezuela.

On 18 March, Army general Carlos Rotondaro, who had been under sanctions by the United States since 2018, defected to Colombia and recognized Guaidó as Venezuela's president. Rotondaro is a former Health Minister and former president of Venezuelan Social Security (Spanish: Instituto Venezolano de los Seguros Sociales – IVSS); in an 18 March interview with NTN24, he mentioned ex-Minister of Health Luis López as the person who had medicines withheld from patients, referring to a New York Times interview of Cuban medical professionals published on the same day. (Note: The New York Times interviewed sixteen Cuban medical professionals in 2019 who had worked for Mission Barrio Adentro prior to the 2018 Venezuelan presidential elections; all sixteen revealed that they were required to participate in voting fraud. They "described a system of deliberate political manipulation"; their services as medical professionals "were wielded to secure votes for the governing Socialist Party, often through coercion", they told The New York Times. Facing a shortage of supplies and medicine, they were instructed to withhold treatment–even for emergencies–so supplies and treatment could be "doled out closer to the election, part of a national strategy to compel patients to vote for the government". They reported that life-saving treatment was denied to patients who supported the opposition. As the election neared, they were sent door-to-door, on house visits with a political purpose: "to hand out medicine and enlist voters for Venezuela's Socialist Party". Patients were warned that they could lose their medical care if they did not vote for the socialist party, and that, if Maduro lost, ties would be broken with Cuba, and Venezuelans would lose all medical care. Patients with chronic conditions, at risk of death if they couldn't get medicine, were a particular focus of these tactics. One said that government officials were posing as doctors to make these house calls before elections; "We, the doctors, were asked to give our extra robes to people. The fake doctors were even giving out medicines, without knowing what they were or how to use them," he said.) On 4 April 2019, Maduro expelled him from the Armed Forces and degraded his rank.

==== Other military ====
Venezuelan National Guardsmen defecting into Colombia

In early 2019, a group of Venezuelan ex-army and police officers in Peru announced support for Guaidó, disclaiming Maduro. Multiple groups of similarly retired or displaced soldiers said that they would return to fight Maduro if needed.

Early on 21 January, at least 27 soldiers of the Venezuelan National Guard stationed near Miraflores Palace mutinied against Maduro. The Guardian reported that they kidnapped four security staff and stole weaponry from a post in Petare, and posted videos on social media promising the military would fight against the government. Rioting and arson took place in the area and tear gas was used on civilian protestors. After overnight fighting, the soldiers were taken by authorities. Five were injured and one person died in the mutiny: a civilian woman who was confused for a protester was killed by members of a colectivo. The BBC compared the mutiny to the El Junquito raid a year earlier, which resulted in the death of rebel leader Óscar Pérez.

On 17 February, five military personnel and snipers were arrested by the Directorate General of Military Counterintelligence in Ureña, Táchira state, after publishing a video in which they declared support for Guaidó.

During the February 2019 attempt to bring humanitarian aid into Venezuela via the Brazilian and Colombian borders, hundreds of lower level troops fled across the border to seek refuge in Colombia. As of 5 April 2019, since the border clashes on 23 February began, 1,285 Venezuelan military personnel and police have broken ranks. According to Colombian immigration authorities, as of 24 April 2019, about 1,400 Venezuelan military personnel have broken ranks and crossed the border into Colombia since the border clashes began on 23 February, in addition to 60 that have crossed into Brazil, according to the Brazilian Army.

During the 30 April 2019 Venezuela uprising, Maduro expelled from the military 54 members, in addition to Cristopher Figuera, who backed Guaidó, among them, "five lieutenant coronels, four majors, four captains, six first lieutenants and 35 sergeants"; 25 military personnel sought asylum in the Brazilian embassy in Caracas. According to Voice of America, experts in the United States believe that "there is still a long way to go" for Guaidó to find support among the armed forces, stating that the Atlantic Council described the defection of National Guardsmen as "significant, but insufficient".

==== Diplomatic and political ====
Following the 23 January events, some Venezuelan diplomats in the United States supported Guaidó; the majority returned to Venezuela on Maduro's orders. Venezuela's ambassador in Iraq, Jonathan Velasco, recognized Guaidó, indicating that the National Assembly is the only government branch "associated with ethics, legitimacy and legality" and responsible for filling the "power vacuum created by the violation of the constitution". The Consul general of Venezuela in Houston recognized Guaidó, saying "I am at your service and at your disposal to serve my country." Although consular officers destroyed thousands of documents from the ambassador's office and both the administration and consular section, nine officials decided to stay.

The top Venezuelan consular officer in Miami supported Guaidó, stating "it [follows] my democratic principles and values" and urging other diplomats to "embrace the Constitution" and join Guaidó in trying to force new elections. Two consular officials in Chicago recognized Guaidó, saying they wanted to be "associated with democratic principles and values".

Colonel José Luis Silva, the Venezuelan military attaché to the United States, recognized Guaidó as his president.

== See also ==
- Plaza Altamira military
