= Ramon Rivero =

Ramon Rivero may refer to:

- Ramón Rivero (1909–1956) also known as Diplo, Puerto Rican comedian, actor, composer
- Ramon Rivero (animator), New Zealand digital puppeteer and computer animator
- José Ramón Rivero, Venezuelan politician
