= José Ramón Rivero =

Venezuelan politician

José Ramón Rivero is a Venezuelan politician. He was the Minister of Work and Social Security from January 2007, replacing Ricardo Dorado, to April 2008. He was replaced by Roberto Manuel Hernández. The decision was related to Rivero's handling of the long-running negotiations between SIDOR's management and its workers. In April 2008 Hugo Chávez acquiesced to the workers' demands and ordered SIDOR to be nationalised.

Rivero was the leader of the FSBT (the Bolivarian Worker's Force), a current within the Unión Nacional de Trabajadores (UNT) union confederation which had previously existed in the Confederación de Trabajadores de Venezuela (CTV). Shortly before his dismissal Rivero publicly backed plans by the FSBT to form a rival union confederation.

Preceded by Ricardo Dorado	Venezuelan Minister of Work and Social Security; January 2007 – April 2008	Succeeded by Roberto Manuel Hernández
