= Luis Tascón =

Venezuelan politician

2005 Venezuelan parliamentary election Results
— Táchira, Deputy to the National Assembly Cir3

Candidates	Votes	%
Luis Tascón	30,055	84%
Rosa Velazco	3,158	9%
Abstention:	119,300	74%
Total Registered voters:	161,659

Luis Tascón Gutiérrez (27 August 1968, Capacho, Táchira – 12 August 2010, Caracas) was a Venezuelan politician and member of the National Assembly.

== Biography ==
The son of Colombian-born parents, Tascón studied Electrical Engineering at the Universidad de los Andes in Mérida, Venezuela. He was a member of the political party Desobediencia Popular (Popular Disobedience) of Mérida from 1986 to 1992, and in 1998, founded the Fifth Republic Movement (MVR) chapter of the Táchira municipality, Independencia.

He was a member of the National Assembly since 1999, and became regional director of the Táchira state MVR in 1999. Tascón became a recognized public figures of the MVR after the events of 11 April 2002, when he helped charge some of the suspects in the Assembly with participation in the brief ousting of President Hugo Chávez.

Tascón became part of a national scandal when he published on his website the signers of 2004 referendum to recall President Chávez, which became known as the Tascón List. Tascón said he posted the list in order to support the verification of signatures. He later removed the list from his website, after widespread accusations that it was being used to discriminate against those who had signed the petition, noting that it was a crime to "persecute" people for signing. Years after Tascón published his list, President Chávez, during a national act transmitted live via television and radio, urged his ministers and any person of his administration in any position to accept, reject or fire employees, to stop using the Tascón List as an effective tool to perform political persecution.

Luis Tascón was re-elected to the National Assembly in the parliamentary election of 2005, representing MVR and the Communist Party of Venezuela of Táchira state. In 2008 he was denied membership of the new PSUV party after he "denounced irregularities in the Ministry of Infrastructure under the management of José David Cabello" (brother of Diosdado Cabello). He subsequently formed the New Revolutionary Road party, which broadly supported the Bolivarian Revolution.

Tascón died on 12 August 2010 of colon cancer.

== See also ==
- Tascón List
