= 2002–2003 Venezuelan general strike =

General strike in Venezuela

The Venezuelan general strike of 2002–2003 was an attempt by the Venezuelan opposition to President Hugo Chávez to summon a new presidential election. It took place from December 2002 to February 2003, when it faded. The government fired over 18,000 PDVSA employees and arrest warrants were issued for the presidents of the striking organizations. The main impact of the strike derived from the stoppage of the oil industry, in particular the state-run PDVSA, which provides a majority of Venezuelan export revenue. The strike was preceded by the 2002 Venezuelan coup d'état attempt in April 2002, and a one-day strike in October 2002.

== Background ==
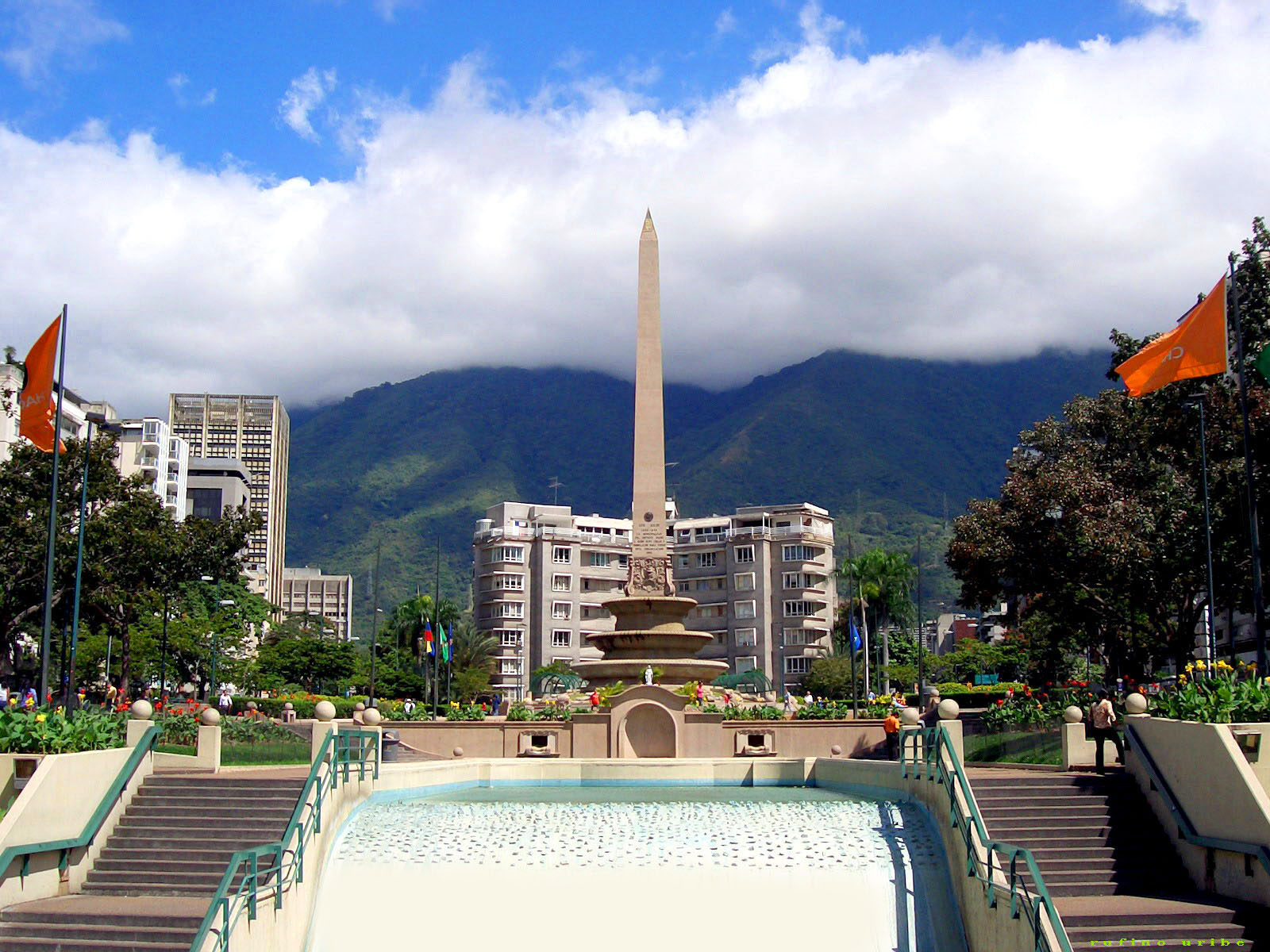
Plaza Francia in Altamira

After April's coup d'état attempt, conflict simmered throughout the rest of 2002. On 14 August the Supreme Tribunal of Justice absolved four military officers involved in the April coup. This set the scene for further actions by the military.

On 21 October, a one-day general strike (paro) took place (two general strikes had taken place in December 2001 and in April 2002), aimed at forcing the resignation of Chávez or at least the calling of new elections. On 22 October, 14 military officers who had been suspended for participating in the coup, led by General Enrique Medina Gómez, occupied Plaza Francia in Altamira, an Eastern Caracas neighbourhood, and declared it a "liberated territory". They said they would not leave until Chávez had resigned, and called on their colleagues in the military to rise against the government.

In early November, there was a major clash of government and opposition demonstrators in downtown Caracas; and, in the middle of the month, a shootout which resulted in three deaths occurred in Caracas' Plaza Bolívar between the Metropolitan Police and the National Guard.

== Strike ==
=== Launch ===
The Coordinadora Democrática, led by the business federation Fedecámaras and the trade union federation Confederación de Trabajadores de Venezuela (CTV), called for a fourth paro cívico, which turned out to be the most serious, and is known as the 2002–2003 oil strike, to begin on 2 December 2002. The opposition also called a recall-referendum-petition-signature-gathering day for 4 December. On 4 December the captain of the large oil tanker Pilín León, named after the beauty queen, anchored in the Lake Maracaibo shipping channel and refused to move. The rest of PDVSA 13-ship fleet was quickly similarly grounded. Combined with the PDVSA management walkout, this effectively paralysed the Venezuelan oil industry.

The key element of the strikemation and technology enterprise that was formed to run electronic operations at Petróleos de Venezuela, was at this time 60 pe was the stoppage of production at the state oil company Petróleos de Venezuela (PDVSA), which was effected by management's locking workers out of facilities, along with the shipping shutdown. Many low and mid-level employees ignored the strike and reported for work. Unlike the previous strikes, this oil strike included not only the PDVSA management but also substantial parts of its operational staff, including virtually all of its marine flotilla captains. Within days the company was paralyzed.

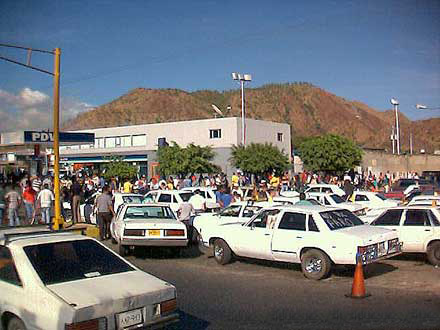
Long vehicular traffics in gas stations on December 10, 2002.

Petroleum production soon fell to one-third normal; Venezuela had to begin importing oil to meet its foreign obligations; and domestically, gasoline for cars became virtually unobtainable, with many filling stations closed and long queues at others.

=== Indefinite strikes ===
Large pro-Chávez and anti-Chávez marches were held in the first weeks of the strike. On 6 December, a Portuguese taxi driver named João de Gouveia killed three and injured 28 at Plaza Altamira. The opposition blamed Chávez, and the killings "energized the opposition movement". On 9 December, the opposition declared the strike to be of indefinite duration, and said that only Chávez's resignation could end it.

Chávez took an increasingly hard line with PDVSA in an attempt to break the strike. On 12 December he fired four PDVSA executives leading the strike, after previously firing some in April. He continued to dismiss striking executives and managers on a daily basis, and by early January 300 were gone.

=== Collapse ===
The following year, "small- and medium-sized businesses reopened their doors, admitting that the strike now threatened to turn into a 'suicide watch' that could well bankrupt their businesses for good." The government gradually reestablished control over PDVSA, and oil production reached pre-strike levels by April 2003.

== Aftermath ==
In the aftermath of the strike, the government fired 18,000 PDVSA employees, 40% of the company's workforce. Arrest warrants were issued for the presidents of Fedecámaras (Carlos Fernández) and the CTV (Carlos Ortega). Involvement in government efforts to maintain food and gasoline distribution saw turning points in the careers of leading businessmen Ricardo Fernández Barrueco and Wilmer Ruperti respectively.

After the February 2003 collapse of the strike, the Coordinadora Democrática (CD) was much more willing to participate in the Organization of American States (OAS) "mesa" dialogue process which had been set up following the 2002 Venezuelan coup d'état attempt. The CD pushed for a binding recall referendum under Article 72 of the Constitution of Venezuela, which was ultimately agreed on 23 May 2003, and took place in August 2004.

The strike produced severe important economic consequences. Open unemployment, which was running about 15% before and after the shutdown, reached 20.3% in March 2003; the volume of crude oil produced was 5% less in 2003 than the previous year; and the volume of refined oil products was 17% less.

In addition the transformation of PDVSA had lasting political consequences, enabling the government to make much more direct use of PDVSA revenues for political projects such as the Bolivarian Missions.

== See also ==
- Plaza Altamira military
- 2004 Venezuelan recall referendum

== Sources ==
- López Maya, Margarita (August 2004). "Venezuela 2001-2004: actores y estrategias" [Venezuela 2001-2004: actors and strategies]. Cuadernos del Cendes (in Spanish). 21 (56): 109–132.
- Margarita López Maya, "Venezuela 2002–2003: Polarization, Confrontation, and Violence," in Olivia Burlingame Goumbri, The Venezuela Reader, Washington D.C., U.S.A., 2005.
