= Plaza Altamira military =

- Part of Protests against Hugo Chávez
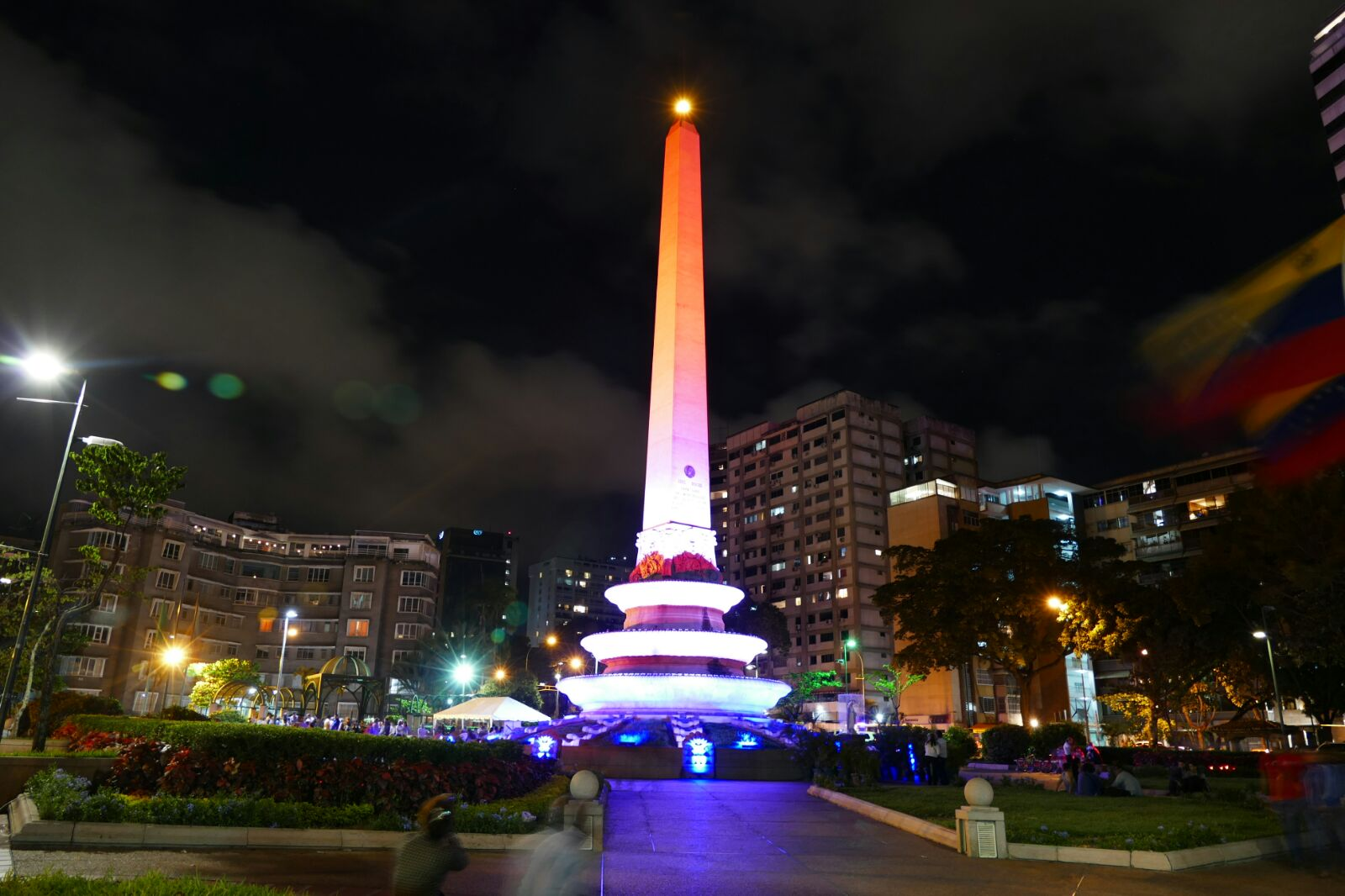
- Plaza Altamira, place where the military protest took place
- Date: 22 October 2002-Early 2003
- Location: Altamira Square, Caracas, Venezuela
- Goals: Resignation of Hugo Chávez
- Result: Protest fails to achieve objectives

Casualties
- Deaths: 3 (João de Gouveia's shooting); 4 (abduction)
- Injuries: 25 (João de Gouveia's shooting)

The Plaza Altamira military were a group of initially fourteen Venezuelan military officers, both active and retired who on 22 October 2002 spoke out against the government of Hugo Chávez in the Altamira Square, in eastern Caracas, declaring the square a "liberated zone" and inviting their fellow soldiers to join them with the aim of achieving Chávez's resignation. The group was widely supported by civil society, and during the course of the protest at least 102 more military personnel joined the group, as well as thousands of opposition demonstrators.

On 6 December, waiter João de Gouveia fired into the crowd gathered in the square, killing three people and wounding 25 others. João was subdued and handed over to the authorities moments later. On 20 February 2003, four other people participating in the rally, including three military personnel, were found dead, after apparently being abducted days earlier in the square. The government decided to let the protest continue, without repressing it. After several months, the rally lost momentum and failed to achieve its objectives.

== See also ==
- 2002 Venezuelan coup attempt
- 2002 Plaza Altamira military shooting
- 2004 Venezuelan protests
- 2004 Venezuelan recall referendum
- Pronunciamiento
- Venezuelan crisis defection
- Venezuelan general strike of 2002–2003
