= Alejandro Plaz =

Venezuelan activist

Ambassador of Venezuela to the Inter-American Development Bank
- In office 28 August 2019 – 1 January 2023
- Appointed by: National Assembly of Venezuela
- President: Juan Guaidó

Personal details
- Born: Alejandro Plaz Castillo; 2 December 1955 (age 70) Caracas, Venezuela
- Education: Universidad Simón Bolívar
- Known for: Cofounder of Súmate

Alejandro Plaz Castillo is a founder of the Venezuelan volunteer civil association, Súmate.

Plaz is a Venezuelan electrical engineer and management consultant who holds three master's degrees (two from Stanford University), and was a Senior partner for McKinsey & Company in Latin America, before taking a leave of absence to co-found Súmate with María Corina Machado.

== Life and education ==
Plaz was born on 2 December 1955, in Caracas, Venezuela. He attended the Colegio de San Agustín, and graduated from high school at the Colegio La Salle La Colina. He graduated in 1977 with a degree in electrical engineering from the Universidad Simón Bolívar in Caracas. After working for two years, he left for the United States. He stayed there for four years, during which he graduated with a master's degree in electrical engineering from Georgia Tech, a master's degree from Stanford University in industrial engineering, and a second master's degree from Stanford in operations research. He returned to Venezuela at the age of 26, where he took a job with the consulting firm McKinsey & Company, where he worked for 23 years.

After working for 20 years with McKinsey, Plaz was offered a one-year sabbatical. He used this time to co-found Súmate, a Venezuelan civil organization that monitors elections. Not long after, he started devoting the majority of his time to it.

== Work with Súmate ==
Plaz states that Súmate is not a political organization, but rather a group of concerned professionals such as engineers and others with technical careers who want to see concrete results and effective democracy.

Plaz and other members of Súmate were charged with treason and conspiracy for receiving a $31,000 grant from the National Endowment for Democracy which, according to the United States Department of State, was "aimed at strengthening citizen participation in the democratic, constitutional processes of their country". The trial was suspended in February 2006 because of due process violations by the trial judge, and has been postponed several times.
