= We Are Venezuela Movement =

Political party in Venezuela

We Are Venezuela Movement Movimiento Somos Venezuela
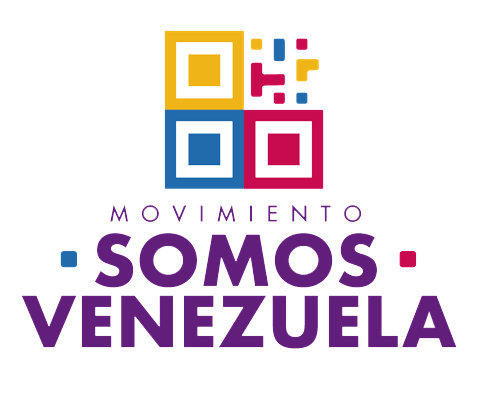
- Abbreviation: MSV
- General Secretary: Vanesa Montero
- Founded: 6 May 2008; 29 January 2018 (refounded)
- Ideology: Chavismo; Democratic socialism Anti-imperialism; Anti-capitalism; Left-wing nationalism
- Political position: Left-wing
- National affiliation: Great Patriotic Pole
- Regional affiliation: São Paulo Forum
- Colors: Dark magenta
- National Assembly: 5 / 277
- Governors: 0 / 23
- Mayors: 0 / 335
- Latin American Parliament: 0 / 12

Website
- msomosvenezuela.org

The We Are Venezuela Movement (Spanish: Movimiento Somos Venezuela, MSV) is a left-wing, socialist, and anti-imperialist political party in Venezuela founded on 6 May 2008 as the New Revolutionary Road (Spanish: Nuevo Camino Revolucionario, NCR) and refounded on 29 January 2018. It was established after three national deputies, Luis Tascón, Luis Díaz Salazar and Wilmer Pérez were expelled by the United Socialist Party of Venezuela (PSUV). Together with deputy Tomás Sánchez, they decided to form a new political party.

Shortly before the formation of NCR, talks were held with deputies Pedro Bastidas and Miguel Rojas of the Ecological Movement of Venezuela to join the new party since they had also recently withdrawn from the PSUV, however they did not accept the proposal. At the end of May 2008, one of the members of the Luis Díaz party announced that possibly some 60 dissident MPs from the PSUV would join the ranks of NCR. However, it failed to gain representation following the 2010 parliamentary election.

== 2018 re-establishment ==
On 27 January 2018, Venezuelan President Nicolás Maduro announced the legalization of Movimiento Somos Venezuela as a political party and the assignment of the Nuevo Camino Revolucionario electoral card to that movement. On 29 January, the CNE admitted the request to change the name of Nuevo Camino Revolucionario to become the Movimiento Somos Venezuela. Being granted on 1 February of that year. On 7 February 2018, National Constituent Assembly president, Delcy Rodríguez resigned from the United Socialist Party of Venezuela (PSUV) to assume the General Secretariat of MSV. But in October she left MSV and returned to PSUV.
