= 2004 Venezuelan recall referendum =

Refendum in Venezuela to recall President Hugo Chávez

- 15 August 2004
- Do you agree to annul the popular mandate granted through legitimate democratic elections to the citizen Hugo Rafael Chávez Frías as president of the Bolivarian Republic of Venezuela for the current presidential term?

Results
Choice	Votes	%
Yes	3,989,008	40.75%
No	5,800,629	59.25%
Valid votes	9,789,637	99.74%
Invalid or blank votes	25,994	0.26%
Total votes	9,815,631	100.00%
Registered voters/turnout	14,037,900	69.92%
- Results by state

The Venezuelan recall referendum of 15 August 2004 was a referendum to determine whether Hugo Chávez, then President of Venezuela, should be recalled from office. The recall referendum was announced on 8 June 2004 by the National Electoral Council (CNE) after the Venezuelan opposition succeeded in collecting the number of signatures required by the 1999 Constitution to effect a recall. The result of the referendum was not to recall Chávez (59% no).

The opposition Coordinadora Democrática declared that fraud had taken place and published a preliminary report supporting the conclusions. The Carter Center, the electoral observers and other analysts denied fraud, saying the referendum was performed in a free and fair manner. The Carter Center released a paper and statistical analysis at the request of the NGO Súmate to evaluate a study by Ricardo Hausmann and Roberto Rigobon, reaffirming the center's original conclusions. Later statistical re-evaluations published in 2006 and 2011 have argued that fraud was committed, but this is contested by organizations that actually observed the election, such as the Carter Center.

== Petition ==
The recall mechanism was introduced into Venezuelan law in 1999 under the new Constitution drafted by the National Constituent Assembly and sanctioned by the electorate in a referendum. Under its provisions, an elected official can be subjected to a recall referendum if a petition gathers signatures from 20% of the corresponding electorate. Thus, to order a presidential recall vote in 2004, 2.4 million signatures were needed, or 20% of the national electorate.

=== Constitutional basis ===
The recall referendum is provided for in two articles of the 1999 Constitution:

Article 72: All [...] offices filled by popular vote are subject to revocation.
Once one-half of the term of office to which an official has been elected has elapsed, a number of voters representing at least 20% of the registered voters in the affected constituency may petition for the calling of a referendum to revoke that official's mandate.
When a number of voters equal to or greater than the number of those who elected the official vote in favour of the recall, provided that a number of voters equal to or greater than 25% of the total number of registered voters vote in the recall referendum, the official's mandate shall be deemed revoked and immediate action shall be taken to fill the permanent vacancy as provided for by this Constitution and by law.

Article 233: The President of the Republic shall become permanently unavailable to serve by reason of any of the following events: death; resignation; [...] recall by popular vote.
[...] When the President of the Republic becomes permanently unavailable to serve during the first four years of his constitutional term of office, a new election by universal suffrage and direct ballot shall be held within 30 calendar days. Pending the election and inauguration of the new President, the Executive Vice President shall take charge of the Presidency of the Republic.
In the cases described above, the new President shall complete the current constitutional term of office. If the President becomes permanently unavailable to serve during the last two years of his constitutional term of office, the Executive Vice President shall take over the Presidency of the Republic until the term is completed.

=== Protests ===
In February 2003, the National Electoral Council announced that the signatures presented to request the recall referendum had to be examined a second time. Protests against the decision began on 27 February 2004 in Caracas and fifteen other cities of the country, lasting five consecutive days. Negotiations between the opposition and government agreeing on signatures led to the end of the protests. During the protests, nine people were killed, of which at least four were due to the response of security officials, hundreds were injured and 300 were arrested.

=== Signature collection drive ===
In August 2003, about 3.2 million signatures were presented by Súmate, a Venezuelan volunteer civil association, founded in 2002. These signatures were rejected by the National Electoral Council (CNE) on the grounds that they had been collected prematurely; i.e., before the midpoint of the presidential term. In September 2003, that the government used a "rapid reaction" squad to raid the offices of CNE, the government body overseeing the petition drive, where the petitions were stored.

In November 2003, the opposition collected a new set of signatures, with 3.6 million names produced in four days. The CNE rejected the petition, saying that only 1.9 million were valid, while 1.1 million were dubious and 460,000 completely invalid. Reaction to the decision to reject the petition (for the second time) resulted in riots that led to nine dead, 339 arrested, and 1,200 injured. The petitioners appealed to the Electoral Chamber of the Venezuelan Supreme Court. The court reinstated over 800,000 of the disputed signatures, bringing the total to 2.7 million, above the 2.4 million needed to authorise the referendum. However, about a week later, the Constitutional chamber of the Supreme Court overturned the Electoral chamber's ruling alleging that the latter did not have jurisdiction for that ruling.

The list of signatories was subsequently collected by the government. The names of petition signers were posted publicly online in what became known as the Tascón List. The president of the Venezuelan Workers Confederation was quoted by the Associated Press as claiming that the Chávez government had begun dismissing petition signers from government ministries, the state oil company, the state water company, the Caracas Metro, and public hospitals and municipal governments controlled by Chávez's party. The Associated Press also quoted Venezuela's Health Minister as justifying petition related layoffs by saying "all those who have signed to activate the recall referendum against President Chávez should be fired from the Health Ministry". He retracted these remarks several days later by saying that they were his own personal opinions and not a matter of public policy. The CNE later admitted that 15,863 signatures of those signatures that were verified in May 2004 belonged to people who had died in 2003.

=== Timing ===
The date chosen for the recall referendum was significant: had the recall vote been held on 19 August or later, Chávez would have been into the fifth year of his six-year term and had he been voted out, Vice President José Vicente Rangel would have taken over and served out the rest of Chávez's presidency (in accordance with Article 233 of the Constitution, above). With the vote called for 15 August, Chávez was not yet into the last two years of his term in office; an unfavourable result would therefore have meant the calling of fresh presidential elections within the following 30 days. Chávez had expressed his clear intention to stand in the election, had he been recalled; the opposition factions, however, maintained that he would have been disqualified from doing so.

== Campaign ==
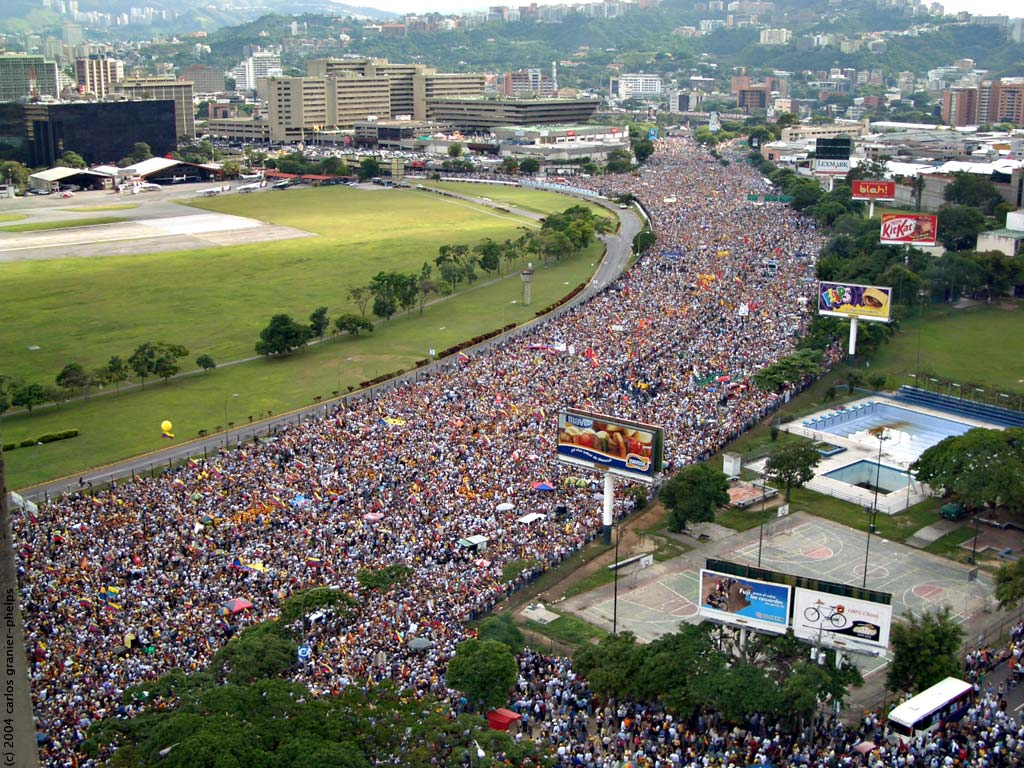
A rally in favor of the recall referendum in the capital, Caracas.

Between late May 2004, when the CNE set the referendum date, and 15 August, the date chosen, a contentious campaign took place, with both sides convinced of victory.

== Opinion polls ==
Although support for Chávez had been low in 2003 and early 2004, polling data showed a shift as the campaign got under way. Most polls, including those by firms linked to the opposition which had shown low support for Chávez in 2003 and early 2004, predicted a rejection of the recall in the weeks before the referendum. Pre-referendum polls, both by opposition and by pro-Chávez groups, during the previous months and weeks predicted the No vote to win by a margin of between 5% and 31%. For example, Greenberg Quinlan Rosner Research (GQR) Inc. and DATOS, both commissioned by the opposition, found margins in favour of No by 5% and 12% respectively in June 2004; Datanálisis found a margin of 14% in favour of Chávez in June. On 11 August, Robert Jensen wrote that recent polls ranged from 8% to 31% for margins in favour of the No vote.

== Ballot ==
The following question was put to the Venezuelan electorate:

¿Está usted de acuerdo con dejar sin efecto el mandato popular otorgado mediante elecciones democráticas legítimas al ciudadano Hugo Rafael Chávez Frías como presidente de la República Bolivariana de Venezuela para el actual período presidencial? ¿NO o SÍ?

Translated into English:

Do you agree to revoke, for the current term, the popular mandate as President of the Bolivarian Republic of Venezuela conferred on citizen Hugo Rafael Chávez Frías through democratic and legitimate elections? NO or YES?

For the recall to be successful, there were three conditions:

- A turnout of at least 25% of the country's 14.25 million registered voters.
- More votes against Chávez than the number who voted for him in the 2000 presidential election (3.76 million).
- More "yes" votes cast than "no" votes.

== Referendum day ==
Polling stations opened at 6 am Venezuelan time on 15 August 2004. Later in the day, faced with a 70% turnout, lengthy queues of waiting voters, and delays exacerbated by the use of novel electronic voting equipment and fingerprint scanners, the electoral authorities agreed to extend the close of voting twice: a four-hour extension of the deadline that took it to 8 p.m., followed by an additional four hours announced later in the evening, which took it to midnight. A record number of voters turned out to defeat the recall attempt with a 59% "no" vote. Former U.S. president Jimmy Carter, who was in Venezuela to observe the electoral process, said of the patiently waiting Venezuelan electors, "This is the largest turnout I have ever seen." In previous presidential elections, turnout figures were at an average 55%. All Venezuelans aged 18 and up whose names appear on the electoral roll were eligible to vote, including those residing abroad: polling stations were set up in Venezuelan embassies and consulates abroad.

=== Parody recording ===
At 3:50pm local time on 15 August, CNE rector Jorge Rodríguez and CNE president Francisco Carrasquero announced on national television that they had found an audio CD where an imitation voice of Carrasquero declared that the opposition had won the referendum with a total of 11,436,086 "yes" votes, and that Chávez's mandate was thereby revoked. Since this was several hours before the closing of the polling booths, and since Carrasquero declared the recording to be fake, this appeared to be a case of attempted sabotage of the referendum. The attorney-general was called on to conduct a full inquiry into the incident and to locate and arrest those responsible for the spurious audio recording. Journalist Fausto Malavé declared in an interview in RCR that the recording was an evident parody that had been circulating in city streets for at least two months, claiming that it was surprising that it was only brought to public attention then. He also expressed concern at the significance that was attributed to it by the CNE.

=== Exit polling ===
Coordinadora Democrática commissioned an exit poll from the American firm of Penn, Schoen & Berland, which showed Chávez losing by a 60–40 margin. PSB used volunteers from Súmate, a NGO which was the primary organizer of the recall referendum, and involved around 200 polling places, out of 8,500. With over 20,000 responses the exit poll produced a much larger amount of data than most opinion polls (typically around 1,000 responses), leading to an extremely low sampling error; however, the Center for Economic and Policy Research suggested that since the chance of sample error in the exit poll was so low and observers did not find any signs of fraud, it may have been the survey's methodology that led to the discrepancy in results. PSB was criticized in the press for how the poll was carried out considering the Súmate group had been involved in organizing the recall and was considered anti-Chávez by the Venezuelan government. Publication or broadcast of exit polls was banned by electoral authorities, but results of the PSB poll went out to media outlets and opposition offices several hours before polls closed. Jimmy Carter said that Súmate "deliberately distributed this erroneous exit poll data in order to build up, not only the expectation of victory, but also to influence the people still standing in line".

== Result ==
The preliminary result was announced on 16 August 2004 on national television and radio after 94% of the vote had been counted, with 58% having voted no and 42% voted yes.. According to these early-morning results, the first condition (a quorum of 25% of the electorate) had been satisfied. The second condition (more votes against Chávez than he received in 2000) would probably be satisfied; however, the third condition (a simple majority: more people voting "yes" than "no") had clearly failed. The final results showed 59% had voted no.

Choice	Votes	%
For	3,989,008	40.75
Against	5,800,629	59.25
Total	9,789,637	100.00
Valid votes	9,789,637	99.74
Invalid/blank votes	25,994	0.26
Total votes	9,815,631	100.00
Registered voters/turnout	14,037,900	69.92
Source: CNE

== Disputes ==
=== Electoral fraud complaints ===
After the preliminary results were broadcast, the opposition Coordinadora Democrática declared that fraud had taken place, stating that its own data (the Penn, Schoen & Berland exit poll, which was performed by volunteers from Súmate, the NGO which had organized the referendum) put the "Yes" vote at 59% and the "No" vote at 40%. Their exit poll showed the opposite result to the official voting data, predicting that Chávez would lose by 20%, whereas the election results showed him to have won by 20%. A poll company representative, Schoen commented, "I think it was a massive fraud." Coordinadora Democrática also told the press that no opposition representation was present when the votes were counted and that the physical ballots had not yet been taken into account.

Constitutional lawyer Tulio Álvarez, representative of the Coordinadora Democrática, published a preliminary report entitled "Fraud to Democracy", the result of the work of 40 professionals diversified in 14 thematic areas, concluding that "qualitative, continued, selective, massive fraud" occurred in the manual and automated procedures, for which the coalition decided to challenge the process. The report explains that it was detected that in Venezuela the scheme of the electoral population averages was broken and in two months it went from 48 points to 53 points of proportion in the electoral population, meaning that close to 1.8 million people who never voted were accounted for, a mobilization of a non-existent population was made to commit fraud in the manual voting according to the report. The study states that mostnew registrants were oriented to rural centers or urban areas of manual voting, in an attempt to disguise the electronic fraud with a voting trend in favor of the "No" option. In the automated process, a collective manipulation of 28% of the vote was detected, which "compromises officials of the National Electoral Council and of the company in charge of the automation". Likewise, evidence of "bidirectionality of communication" was found, since according to the data obtained from CANTV there was traffic to and from the machines before printing the ballots, and it is indicated that there was "a pattern of communications intervention. At certain hours, traffic was concentrated to receive information, send and manipulate it", transmissions "outside the allowed hours, since 7:00 a.m.", when it was established that "the machine would not be connected until the closing of the process".

Some individuals have disputed the center's endorsement of the electoral process in the Venezuelan recall referendum of 2004. Fox News' Doug Schoen told Michael Barone at U.S. News & World Report, "Our internal sourcing tells us that there was fraud in the Venezuelan central commission. There are widespread reports of irregularities and evidence of fraud, many of them ably recorded by Mary Anastasia O'Grady in The Wall Street Journal last week. Carter is untroubled by any of this, and declares that Chavez won 'fair and square.'" The Carter Center looked into the allegations and released a paper and statistical analysis reaffirming their original conclusions.

=== Process endorsements ===
The day before the polling, former U.S. President Jimmy Carter expressed confidence that the vote would proceed in a calm and orderly fashion. Carter commented that, "I might project results that will be much more satisfactory than they were in 2000 in Florida". On the afternoon of 16 August 2004, Carter and OAS Secretary General César Gaviria gave a joint press conference in which they endorsed the preliminary results announced by the CNE. The monitors' findings "coincided with the partial returns announced today by the National Elections Council" said Carter, while Gaviria added that the OAS electoral observation mission's members had "found no element of fraud in the process". Directing his remarks at opposition figures who made claims of "widespread fraud" in the voting, Carter called on all Venezuelans to "accept the results and work together for the future". The Carter Center "concluded the results were accurate."

The U.S. Department of State accepted that the results of the subsequent audit were "consistent with the results announced by (Venezuela's) National Electoral Council." John Maisto, U.S. Permanent Representative to the Organization of American States, added that the results of the referendum "speak for themselves", saying that the quest for Venezuelan democracy "does not end with a single electoral process or referendum" and urging the "democratically elected government of Venezuela to address and recognize the legitimate concerns, rights, and aspirations of all of its citizens". Regarding the recall effort, in testimony before the U.S. Senate, Maisto also pointed out that Carter had said that " 'expression of the citizen must be privileged over excessive technicalities' in resolving issues surrounding the tabulation of the signatures". European Union observers did not oversee the elections, saying too many restrictions were put on their participation by the Chávez administration.

=== Analyses ===
Economists Ricardo Hausmann of Harvard University and Roberto Rigobón of the MIT Sloan School of Management performed a statistical analysis at Súmate's request, analyzing how fraud could have occurred during the referendum. They concluded that the vote samples audited by the government were not a random representation of all precincts, noting that the Chávez-backed CNE had "refused to use the random number generating program offered by the Carter Center for the 18 August audit and instead used its own program installed in its own computer and initialed with their own seed." They also noted that opposition witnesses and international observers were not allowed near the computer hub on election day. According to the Wall Street Journal, a computer-science professor at Johns Hopkins University said, "The Hausmann/Rigobon study is more credible than many of the other allegations being thrown around." The Carter Center looked into the allegations and released a paper with a statistical analysis in response; this stated that the audit sample data, in particular the statistical correlation between the number of "Yes" voters and the number of petition signatories in each audited voting centre, were consistent with nationwide results, and reaffirmed the Carter Center's earlier conclusions.

The Center for Economic and Policy Research drew on the Carter Center analysis and elaborated on the issue, criticising Hausmann and Rigobón's statistical model. Furthermore, the CEPR analysis noted that "although Hausmann and Rigobón's analysis does not require this data to be accurate, it does require that its errors be uncorrelated with those of the signatures, something that cannot be assumed without any verifiable knowledge or observation of where the data came from. Javier Corrales wrote in the Foreign Policy Magazine that the opposition was "shocked not so much by the results as by the ease with which international observers condoned the Electoral Council's flimsy audit of the results." The sample for the audit was selected by the government controlled National Electoral Council and, according to the opposition, was not of sufficient size to be statistically reliable.

Election observers insisted that no fraud had taken place, but scholarly analyses published over the years to come disagreed. A statistical study by Maria M. Febres Cordero and Bernardo Márquez was published in 2006 in a peer-reviewed academic statistics journal. The study used cluster analysis to review differences in vote patterns between voting certificates on the basis that voters were randomly assigned to certificates (each voting center had on average 2 or 3 certificates, typically for computerised and manual voting systems). It concluded: "[The] Venezuelan opposition has statistical evidence to reject the official results given by the CNE. The irregularities detected were observed consistently in numerous voting centers and the magnitude of the irregularities imply that the official results do not reflect the intention of voters with statistical confidence." They estimated that 56.4% had voted yes to recall Chavez, as opposed to the official result of 41%.

The presence of systemic election fraud was supported by six analyses in a special section in the November 2011 issue of Statistical Science. Raquel Prado and Bruno Sansó examined the exit polls; Luis Raul Pericchi and David A Torres examined the no-votes against the Newcomb-Benford law; Isbelia Martin discovered anomalous patterns in telecommunications; Ricardo Hausmann and Roberto I. Rigobón analyzed patterns related to exit polls; Raúl Jiménez examined the distribution of valid votes, null votes, and abstentions in each precinct; while Gustavo Delfino and Guillermo Salas reported on the anomalous relation between signatures requesting the recall, and the yes-votes. The section is introduced by an article written by Alicia L. Carriquiry. One of the papers by Hausmann and Rigobón was a later version of a paper disputed by the Carter Center, and contains a response to that criticism.

== See also ==
- 2004 Venezuelan protests
- 2016 Venezuelan recall referendum project
- 2022 Venezuelan recall referendum project
- Plaza Altamira military
