= Coordinadora Democrática (Venezuela) =

Venezuelan political party alliance

- Formation: 5 July 2002
- Dissolved: 2004
- Type: Political organization
- Location: Venezuela

The Coordinadora Democrática (Democratic Coordinator, CD) was an umbrella group of Venezuelan political parties, civil associations and non-government organisations opposed to President Hugo Chávez. Founded on 5 July 2002, the organization negotiated with the government in November 2002 under the auspices of the Organization of American States Secretary General César Gaviria. The Coordinadora Democrática also helped to organize the 2002–2003 Venezuelan general strike and the 2004 recall referendum.

== History ==
The organization was founded on 5 July 2002 and officially constituted on 17 October of the same year, with supra-organizational characteristics that brought together movements of different ideologies. In November 2002, the Secretary General of the Organization of American States (OAS), César Gaviria, installed a dialogue table between the government and the Coordinadora Democrática (Mesa de Negociación y Acuerdos). After successive meetings with opposition leaders and government spokespersons, Gaviria explained that the table would be formed by six members appointed by the government and an equal number from the CD. On 13 November 2002, in Caracas, the government and the opposition negotiate under the auspices of the OAS, the United Nations Development Program (UNDP) and the Carter Center.

The purpose of the coalition was to reach an "agreement for the democratic reconstruction in Venezuela" and to establish the "bases for a democratic agreement" as soon as the Chávez government ended its term, in the constitution document it was established that the exit from power of President Chávez must be done in any way "according to the legal ways and resources of the National Constitution" without discarding article 350 of the constitution "through which the Venezuelan people may disown the current authoritarian and anti-democratic regime". The organization contemplated to call for presidential and parliamentary elections after an eventual exit of Chávez, to reform the national constitution to allow a second electoral round, to reduce the presidential term from six to four years and also to establish a commission to investigate the killings of 11 April 2002.

Along with the employers' organization Fedecámaras, the union Confederation of Workers of Venezuela, and the oil workers, the Coordinadora Democrática was among the main promoters of the general strike between December 2002 and January 2003. Afterwards, the organization was focused in activing a recall referendum against Chávez under Article 72 of the Constitution of Venezuela, which was ultimately agreed on 23 May 2003. The referendum took place on 15 August 2004 and was not approved. The Coordinadora Democrática rejected the outcome, citing fraud.

== Parties ==
- Acción Agropecuaria (AA)
- Acción Democrática (AD)
- Alianza Bravo Pueblo (ABP)
- Alianza por la Libertad (APL)
- Bandera Roja (BR)
- Convergencia
- Copei
- La Causa R (LCR)
- Movimiento al Socialismo (MAS)
- Movimiento de Integridad Nacional Unidad (MIN)
- Primero Justicia (PJ)
- Proyecto Venezuela (PV)
- Solidaridad
- Solidaridad Independiente (SI)
- Unión
- Unión Republicana Democrática (URD)
- Visión Emergente (VE)

Among the parties that joined later were:

- Democracia Renovadora (DR)
- Fuerza Liberal (FL)
- Movimiento Republicano (MR)
- Movimiento Trabajo (MT)
- Opinión Nacional (Opina)
- Movimiento Resistencia Civil (MRC)
- Un Nuevo Tiempo (UNT)
- Un Solo Pueblo (USP)

== See also ==
- Democratic Unity Roundtable
