= 2016 Venezuelan recall referendum project =

Planned vote to remove Nicolás Maduro

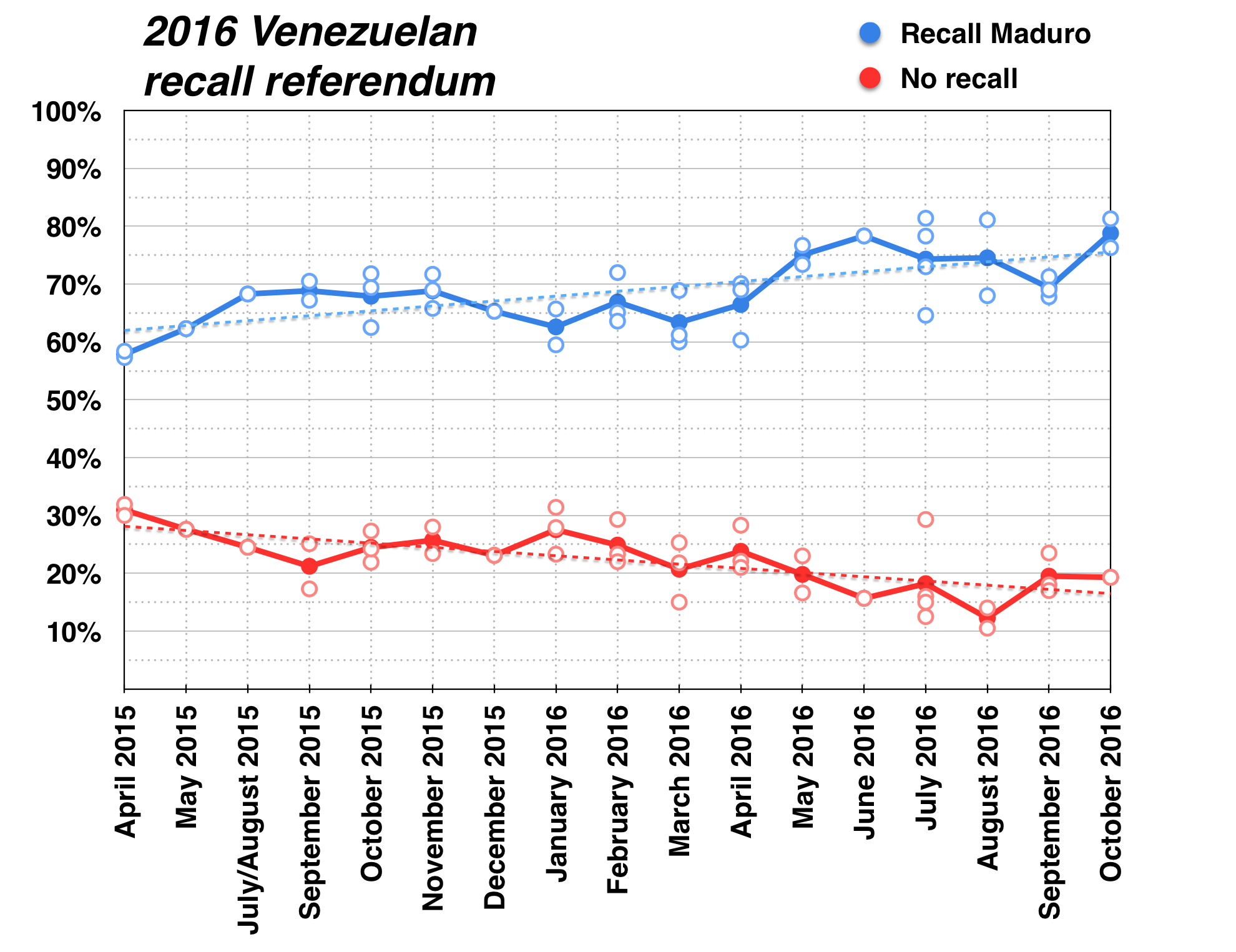
The blue line represents percentage that favor recalling President Maduro. The red line represents percentage that do not wish to recall President Maduro. Unfilled dots represent individual results of the polls. Most polls were discontinued due to the suspension of the recall movement.

A process to hold a recall referendum to vote on recalling Maduro was started on May 2, 2016. On that date, opposition leaders in Venezuela handed in a petition to the National Electoral Council (CNE) that started a several stage process. The Venezuelan government stated that if enough signatures were collected, a recall vote would be held no sooner than 2017. On 21 October 2016, the CNE suspended the referendum days before preliminary signature-gatherings were to be held.

== Initial petition ==
On May 2, 2016, opposition leaders in Venezuela handed in a petition calling for a recall referendum. On June 21, 2016, the BBC reported that signatures for a referendum to recall Maduro were being recorded by the National Electoral Council (CNE), with the process ongoing for several days. The petition required 1% of the electorate to endorse it before the next stage of voting could be held. According to opposition leaders, in July during a preliminary signature drive for the recall, the CNE "rejected more than half a million signatures for reasons ranging from unclear handwriting to smudged fingerprints."

In early July 2016, United States President Barack Obama urged Venezuela to allow the recall referendum. On July 5, 2016, the Venezuelan intelligence service detained five opposition activists involved with the recall referendum, with two other activists of the same party, Popular Will, also arrested.

According to a July 27, 2016 article in The Guardian, "Venezuela's opposition has demanded authorities move forward on a referendum to force Nicolás Maduro from office, amid complaints that the government is digging in its heels to delay the process." Several days before protests on the issue at the headquarters of the CNE had been held after the CNE missed a deadline on announcing whether a recent petition had collected enough valid signatures. The government, in response, argued the protestors were part of a plot to topple Maduro. At the time, a poll by Venebarómetro found that "88% of 'likely' voters in a recall would choose to oust Maduro."

== Second phase ==
On August 1, 2016, the CNE announced that enough signatures had been validated for the recall process to continue. A date was not set by the CNE for the second phase to take place, which requires raising 20 percent of the electorates' signatures. While opposition leaders pushed for the recall to be held before the end of 2016, allowing a new presidential election to take place, the government vowed a recall would not occur until 2017, ensuring the current vice president would potentially come to power. Reuters reported that the government had launched 9,000 lawsuits alleging fraud in signature collection by that time.

On August 9, 2016, the CNE presented a timeline for the referendum that made it unlikely it would be held before the end of 2016, in part due to a new 90-day verification period for signatures. The second stage of the petition was estimated by the CNE to likely take place in October 2016, resulting in a vote likely happening in February 2017. Opposition leaders were reported to be planning a large protest march in response, with leaders accusing the CNE of favoring the incumbent Socialist Party with the wait time. According to Reuters on August 9, "Socialist Party leaders have dismissed the recall effort as fraudulent and noted that the elections council found nearly 10,000 signatures corresponding to people who were deceased."

Early on September 21, 2016, the National Electoral Council set new guidelines for the recall campaign that The Associated Press described as "unfavorable to the opposition." Among other rules, officials announced that signatures would need to be gathered from 20 percent of Venezuelan voters over three days, specifically October 26 until October 28. In addition, officials required campaigners to gather 20 percent from the electorate in each state, although "opposition leaders say they should only have to gather signatures from 20 percent of voters nationwide." The opposition, which had asked for 20,000 voting machines, was granted 5,400 by officials. On September 21, 2016, the National Electoral Council announced the recall referendum would not be held before January 10, meaning new elections would be ruled out in favor of the VP assuming Maduro's place until the end of the term in 2019. The CNE said that the vote "could be held in the middle of the first quarter of 2017."

== Suspension ==
When this happens there is no democracy. What Venezuela has is dictatorship...

— Jose Vicente Haro, Venezuelan law expert

On 21 October 2016, the CNE suspended the referendum only days before preliminary signature-gatherings were to be held. The CNE blamed alleged voter fraud as the reason for the cancellation of the referendum.

=== Reaction ===
Opposition leaders responded by calling on protests against the CNE's actions. The day after the government's announcement, several thousand Venezuelans marched through Caracas protesting against the suspension. Demonstrators were led by Lilian Tintori and Patricia Gutiérrez, wives of arrested opposition politicians.

Experts described the suspension as "unconstitutional". Venezuelan constitutional law expert Jose Vicente Haro stated that the move by the Bolivarian government shows no respect for the constitution while the Washington Office on Latin America called the suspension "a setback for democracy".

Following the suspension of the recall movement, a Venebarómetro poll found that 61.4% found that Maduro had become a dictator, while in a poll taken by Keller and Associates 63% of those questioned thought that Maduro was a dictator.

== International reactions ==
Reuters reported on August 4, 2016, that U.S. Secretary of State John Kerry had stated that "we encourage Venezuela to embrace the recall not in a delayed way that pushes it into next year, but to do this as a sign of respect for the constitution of the country and the needs of the people of the country." On August 11, 2016, 15 countries in the Organization of American States released a joint statement urging for the referendum to be held "without delay," to "contribute to the quick and effective resolution of the current political, economic and social difficulties in the country."

== See also ==
- 2004 Venezuelan recall referendum
- 2022 Venezuelan recall referendum project
