= Carlos Ortega (unionist) =

Venezuelan union and political leader

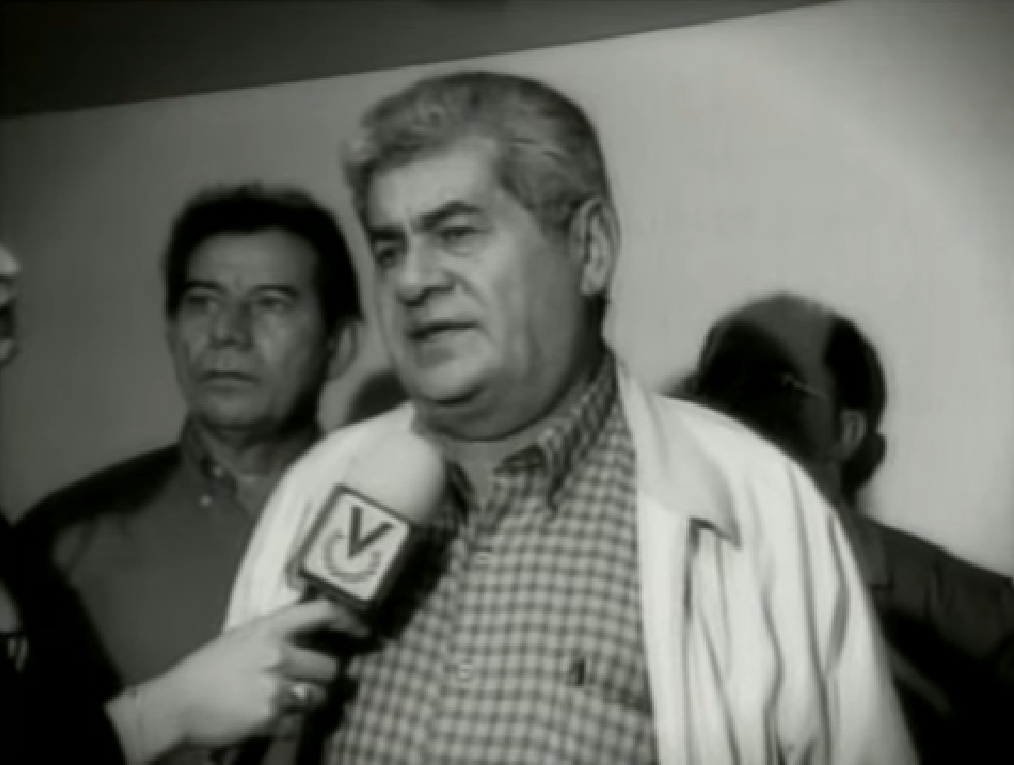
Carlos Ortega during the general strike of 2002–2003

Carlos Alfonso Ortega Carvajal (born c. 1945) is a former union and political leader in Venezuela. Ortega, then head of Fedepetrol, the oil workers union, was elected leader of the Confederación de Trabajadores de Venezuela (CTV) union federation in 2001. He played an important role during the Venezuelan general strike of 2002–2003, resulting in a 16-year prison term. Ortega ultimately escaped from prison on 13 August 2006.

== Head of CTV ==
In 2001, Ortega was elected leader of the Confederación de Trabajadores de Venezuela (CTV), then the largest trade union federation in Venezuela. The results were disputed and the Supreme Court refused to ratify them. In April 2002, under Carlos Ortega's leadership, the CTV declared a national strike, to protest against the perceived increasingly dictatorial policies of Venezuelan President Hugo Chávez. This culminated in a protest march to Miraflores Palace. After violence resulted in the death of 19 people, President Chávez was briefly removed from power in the 2002 Venezuelan coup d'état.

Between December 2002 and February 2003, CTV and Fedecámaras carried out a joint strike work stoppage, the Venezuelan general strike of 2002-2003. Chávez had moved in late 2002 to implement greater control over the state oil company, Petróleos de Venezuela (PDVSA), and its revenues. For two months following December 2, 2002, Chávez faced a strike organized by the PDVSA management who sought to force Chávez out of office by completely removing his access to the all-important government oil revenue. The strike, led by a coalition of labor unions and oil workers, sought to halt the activities of the PDVSA, and for some time successfully did so.

=== Charges and asylum ===
After charges were brought against Ortega in relation to the strike, he was granted asylum from the embassy of Costa Rica on March 14, 2003, and left Venezuela on March 27, 2003. On March 30, 2004, Ortega's asylum in Costa Rica was revoked after he failed to comply with the rules set by the government of Costa Rica when the asylum was granted: "he reportedly told a meeting in Miami, Florida, that he would return to Venezuela to work clandestinely to remove the government of Hugo Chavez." The Costa Rican government said Ortega had twice been warned about using his freedom of speech responsibly. After this Ortega left Costa Rica. On March 1, 2005, nearly one year after his exile to Costa Rica, Ortega was apprehended outside a Caracas nightclub.

On 13 December 2005, Ortega was sentenced to 16 years for his role in the strike. He escaped from the Ramo Verde penitentiary with three other detainees: Jesús Faría Rodríquez, Darío Faría Rodríguez and Rafael Faría Villasmil, on 13 August 2006. His escape may have been facilitated by authorities. Carlos Roa, Ortega's lawyer, expressed surprise when hearing of the news and had doubts of its truth. The Attorney General's office announced that an inquiry would be made into "everyone showing solidarity and support" for Ortega's escape, and that those who "praised the incident" could be charged under Article 285 of the Penal Code, which "labels generic or indirect solicitation as a crime. Based on this assumption, publicity is also a requirement. This behavior can be established in three ways -solicitation to disobey laws, hatred among citizens and apology of a crime or defense of people who put public peace in jeopardy."

In September 2007 Venezuelan ambassador Armando José Laguna claimed that the Venezuelan government had discovered that Ortega had been residing in Lima citing photos of Ortega at a restaurant in Lima as proof. Peru's Foreign Affairs Minister José Antonio García Belaúnde later confirmed the claim made by the Venezuelan government and stated that Ortega had been granted political asylum on the basis of "humanitarian reasons". While in exile, he signed the Madrid Charter.

== See also ==
- Political prisoners in Venezuela
