= Vanesa Montero =

Venezuelan politician (born 1996)

Member of the National Assembly
- Incumbent
- Assumed office 5 January 2021

Personal details
- Born: 22 February 1996 (age 30)
- Party: We Are Venezuela Movement (since 2018); United Socialist Party of Venezuela (until 2018)

Vanesa Yuneth Montero López (born 22 February 1996) is a Venezuelan politician serving as a member of the National Assembly since 2021. She has served as secretary general of the We Are Venezuela Movement since 2020.
