= President of Venezuela =

Head of state and government

President of the Bolivarian Republic of Venezuela
- Presidenta de la República Bolivariana de Venezuela
- Presidential emblem

- Presidential Standard

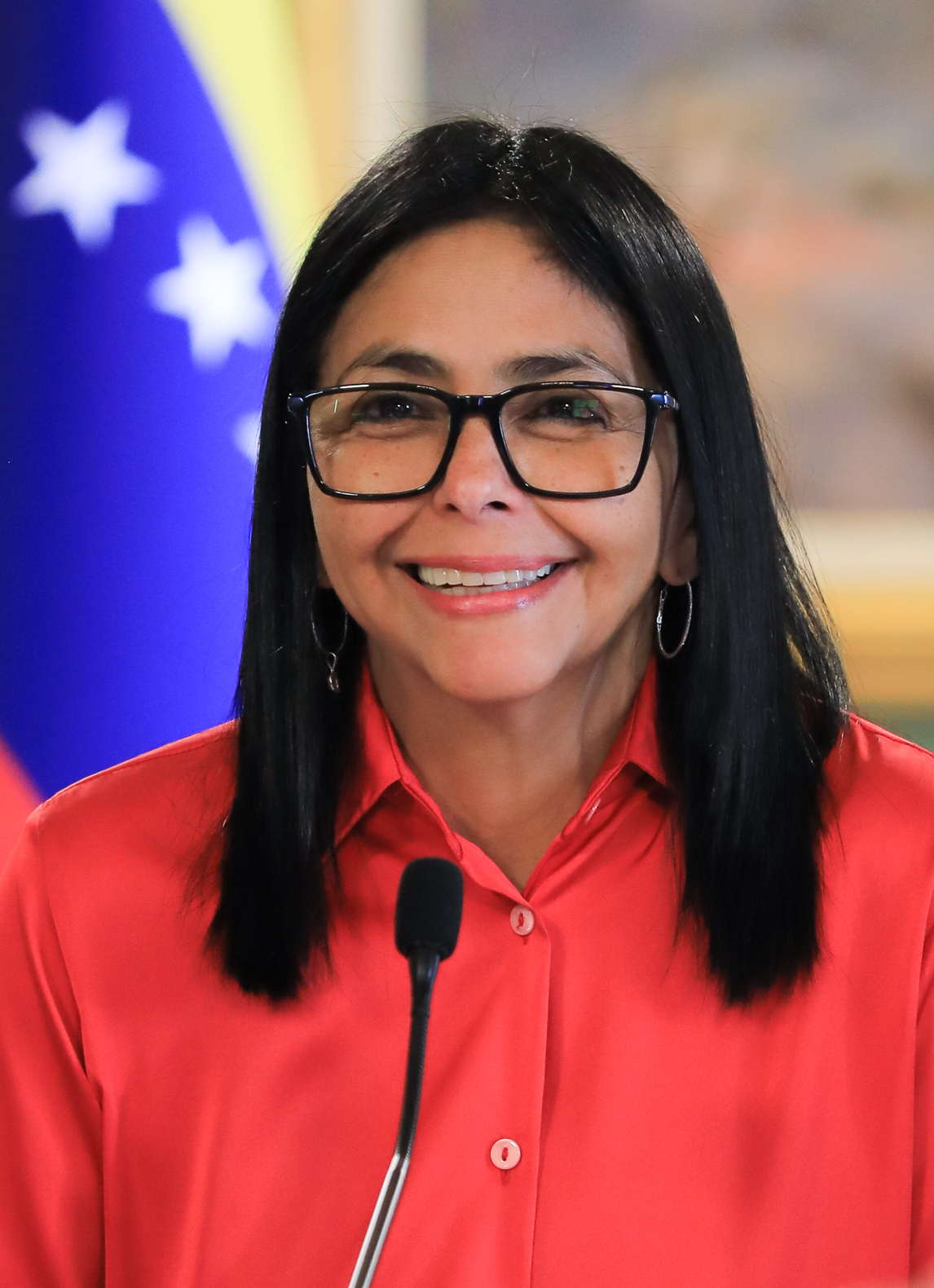
- Incumbent; Delcy Rodríguez; Acting since 5 January 2026
- Executive branch of the Government of Venezuela
- Style: Mr./Madam President (Señor/a Presidente/a) (informal); The Most Excellent (Excelentísimo/a Señor/a) (diplomatic)
- Member of: Cabinet
- Residence: La Casona
- Seat: Miraflores Palace, Caracas
- Appointer: Popular vote election
- Term length: 6 years, no term limits
- Constituting instrument: Constitution of Venezuela (1999)
- Inaugural holder: Cristóbal Mendoza (First Republic); José Antonio Páez (State of Venezuela)
- Formation: 13 January 1830 (196 years ago)
- Deputy: Vice President
- Salary: US$4,068 monthly
- Website: presidencia.gob.ve (in Spanish)

The president of Venezuela (Spanish: Presidente de Venezuela), officially known as the president of the Bolivarian Republic of Venezuela (Spanish: Presidente de la República Bolivariana de Venezuela), is the executive head of state and head of government of Venezuela. The president leads the National Executive of the Venezuelan government and is the commander-in-chief of the National Bolivarian Armed Forces. Presidential terms were set at six years with the adoption of the 1999 Constitution of Venezuela, and presidential term limits were removed in 2009.

The office of president in Venezuela has existed since the 1811 Venezuelan Declaration of Independence from the Spanish Crown; the first president was Cristóbal Mendoza. From 1821 to 1830, Venezuela was a member state of Gran Colombia, and the Venezuelan executive was absorbed by the Colombian government in Bogotá. When the State of Venezuela became independent from Gran Colombia, the office of the president was restored under José Antonio Páez. Every head of state of Venezuela since then has held the title of president.

During the 19th century, Venezuela suffered political turmoil and autocracy, remaining dominated by regional military dictators until the mid-20th century. Since 1958, the country has had a series of democratic civilian governments until the 2010s, as an exception where most of the region was ruled by military dictatorships, and the period was characterized by economic prosperity.

The Venezuelan presidential crisis was a political crisis concerning the leadership and who holds the office remained disputed until 5 January 2023. It began when the opposition-majority National Assembly declared that incumbent Nicolás Maduro's 2018 re-election was invalid and the body declared its president, Juan Guaidó, to be acting president of the country. However, support for Guaidó declined following a failed uprising attempt in April 2019. Efforts led by Guaidó to create a transitional government were unsuccessful, with Maduro continuing to control Venezuela's state institutions. The European Union still does not recognize Maduro as the legitimate president, threatening his government with further sanctions. The interim government was dissolved in December 2022, when three of the four main political parties approved its dissolution to create a commission of five members to manage foreign assets, as the deputies sought a united strategy ahead of the presidential election of July 2024.

Following the 2026 United States strikes in Venezuela, in which president Nicolás Maduro was captured by and taken to the United States, Rodríguez was appointed acting president by order of the Supreme Tribunal of Justice, having already served in a de facto capacity in the immediate aftermath of Maduro's capture. Both Rodríguez and Maduro have asserted that the latter remains the legal officeholder. Venezuela has effectively been controlled by the U.S. Secretary of State Marco Rubio, who has been referred to as the country's "viceroy," ever since the United States operation.

== Powers ==
Presidential Standard. (In Land)

Presidential Standard. (At Sea)

As a self described republic with a presidential executive, Venezuela grants significant powers to the president. The president effectively controls the executive branch, represents the country abroad, and appoints the cabinet and, with the approval of the National Assembly, the judges for the Supreme Tribunal of Justice. The president is also the commander-in-chief of the National Bolivarian Armed Forces (FANB).

The powers and obligations of the president of Venezuela are established, limited and numbered by articles 236 and 237 of the constitution:

1. To comply with and enforce the Constitution and laws of the Republic.
2. To direct the activities of the Federal Government.
3. To appoint and remove the Executive Vice-president and the Cabinet Ministers.
4. To direct the international relations of the Republic and sign and ratify international treaties, agreements or conventions.
5. To direct the National Armed Forces in his or her capacity as Commander-in-Chief.
6. To exercise supreme command over the National Armed Forces, promote their officers at the rank of colonel or naval captain and above, and appoint them to the positions exclusively reserved to them.
7. To declare states of exception and order the restriction of guarantees in the cases provided for under the Constitution.
8. To issue executive orders having the force of law, subject to authorization in advance by an enabling act.
9. To call special plenary sessions of the National Assembly.
10. To issue regulations for the application of laws, in whole or in part, without altering the spirit, purpose and reason for being of the laws.
11. To administer the National Public Treasury.
12. To negotiate national loans.
13. To order extraordinary budget item in addition to the budget, subject to authorization in advance from the National Assembly or the Delegated Committee.
14. To enter into contracts in the national interest, subject to this Constitution and applicable laws.
15. To designate, subject to prior authorization from the National Assembly or the Standing Commission of the same, the Attorney-General of the Republic and the heads of the permanent diplomatic missions.
16. To designate and remove those officials whose appointment is made subject to his/her discretion by the Constitution or the applicable laws.
17. To address reports or special messages to the National Assembly, either in person or through the executive vice-president.
18. To formulate the National Development Plan and, subject to approval in advance from the National Assembly, direct the implementation of the same.
19. To grant pardons.
20. To determine the number, organization and competence of the Ministries and other organs comprising the National Public Administrative Branch, as well as the organization and functions of the Cabinet Ministers, within the principles and guidelines set forth in the pertinent organic law.
21. To dissolve the National Assembly in the case contemplated by the Constitution.
22. To call reference in the cases provided for under the present Constitution.
23. To call and preside over meetings of the National Defense Council.
24. Any others vested in the president under the Constitution and legislative acts of the Republic.

=== Complements and compensations ===
The president's salary directly derives from the National Treasury, as stated in the Organic Law of Salaries, Pensions and Retirements of High Officials of the Public Power. During his or her tenure, the president may not be employed by anyone else, nor receive any other salary from the state. The president's salary is not to be superior to twelve monthly minimum wages, that is to say, 67,469.76 VEF (as of February 2015).

The Presidential Honor Guard Brigade of Venezuela is in charge of the president's protection, as well as the presidential family and their political peers. The Presidential Guard of Honor is made up of members from the four service branches of the National Bolivarian Armed Forces and other institutions of public security, and is headed by a general or flag officer.

Since 1900, the official workplace of the president is the Palace of Miraflores in Caracas. The presidential residence has been the palace of La Casona since 1964, instituted by president Raúl Leoni. La Casona is not used by incumbent president Maduro, who has decided not to inhabit it.

Presidential Palaces

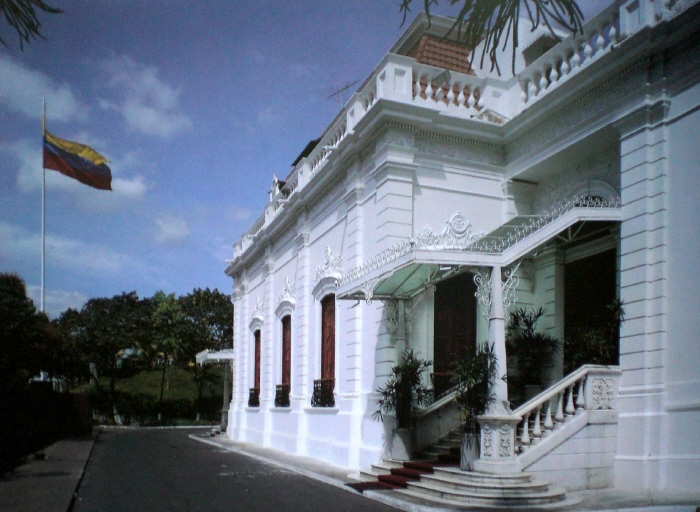
Miraflores Palace

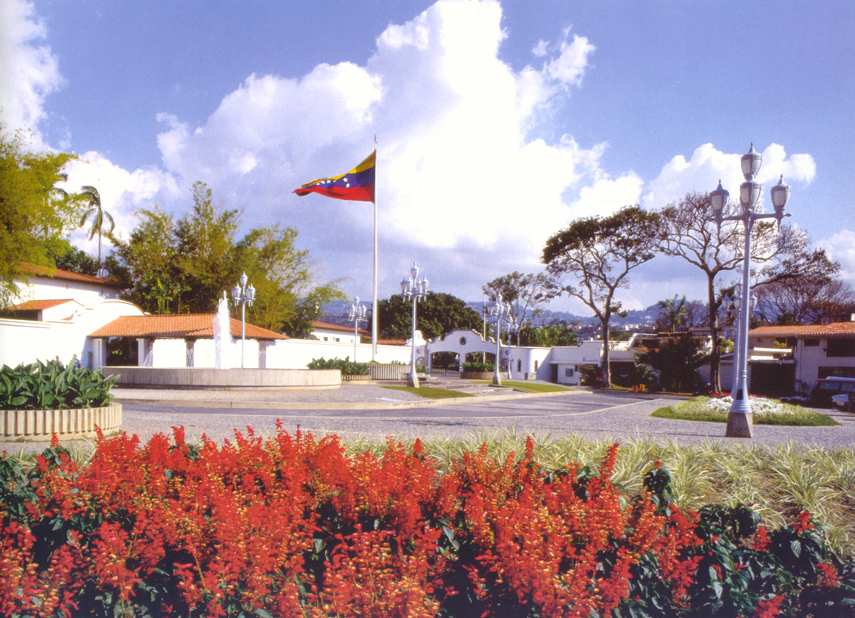
La Casona

== History ==
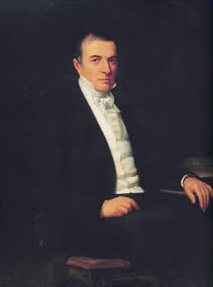
Cristóbal Mendoza, first President of Venezuela. Painting by Martín Tovar y Tovar.

The presidential designation encompasses only those persons who were sworn into office as President of Venezuela following Venezuela's declaration of independence from Spanish colonial rule, which took effect on 5 July 1811. The first president, taking office on 5 July 1811, was actually the president of a triumvirate of the first established Republic of Venezuela that rotated the presidency weekly. The person serving as president during the week of 5 July was one of the three signatories of the Declaration of Independence: Cristóbal Mendoza. Mendoza shared the triumvirate with Juan Escalona and Baltasar Padrón. A second triumvirate followed on 3 April 1812, whose members were Francisco Espejo, Fernando Toro and Francisco Javier Ustariz.

Owing to the profound confusion of the Venezuelan War of Independence and the period of Gran Colombia over what is now Venezuela, this page has gaps between 1813 and 1819. For this period in time, historians refer to the Republic of Venezuela as the Second Republic of Venezuela (1813–1814) and the Third Republic of Venezuela (1817–1819) as Simon Bolivar twice reestablished the republic. The Congress of Angostura appointed Simón Bolívar "Supreme Commander of the Republic of Venezuela" (Jefe Supremo de la República de Venezuela) from 1819 until 1830.

In 1830, José Antonio Páez declared Venezuela independent from Gran Colombia and became president, taking office on 13 January 1830. Although he was not the first president of Venezuela (having in mind Cristóbal Mendoza in 1811), he was the first head of state of independent Venezuela, after the dissolution of Gran Colombia. From that point on, five constitutions were adopted, all slightly changing the extent of the president's powers and responsibilities.

During the 19th century, Venezuela suffered political turmoil and autocracy, remaining dominated by regional military dictators until the mid-20th century. Since 1958, the country has had a series of democratic governments, as an exception where most of the region was ruled by military dictatorships, and the period was characterized by economic prosperity.

Nicolás Maduro of the United Socialist Party of Venezuela (PSUV) entered the office as interim president on 5 March 2013 after the death of Hugo Chávez, and was elected in the 2013 presidential election. He was reelected in the 2018 presidential election, which was disputed amid charges of irregularities including: the elections were held four months before the prescribed date, multiple major opposition parties were banned from participating or imprisoned, and there were charges of vote-buying.

On 5 January 2019, the National Assembly declared that—following the expiration of the mandate granted through the 2013 presidential election—Maduro would have no constitutional mandate to govern Venezuela if he was sworn in on 10 January. Article 233 of the Venezuelan Constitution establishes that in the event of a presidential vacuum, the president of the National Assembly takes charge of the presidency until a new election is called within 30 days. Noting that the 2018 presidential election failed to adhere to constitutional requirements, the National Assembly contend that Maduro's second term never began, and the seat is vacant.

On 11 January, Juan Guaidó of the Popular Will party and president of the legislature stated that he was prepared to take on the role of acting president. With the National Assembly recognizing a vacuum in the office of the president, and citing Article 233 of the Venezuelan Constitution, Guaidó was declared acting president of Venezuela by that body on 16 January. The legislature approved the Statute Governing the Transition to Democracy to Re-establish the Validity of the Constitution of the Bolivarian Republic of Venezuela (Spanish: Estatuto que Rige la Transición a la Democracia para Restablecer la Vigencia de la Constitución de la República Bolivariana De Venezuela) on 5 February, defining the timing of the transition.

Maduro's controversial win and Guaidó's subsequent claim triggered the Venezuelan presidential crisis. The international community is divided on the issue of the Venezuelan presidency; AP News reported that "familiar geopolitical sides" had formed, with allies Russia, China, Iran, Syria, and Cuba supporting Maduro, and the US, Canada, and most of Western Europe supporting Guaidó. Moreover, the United Nations has continued to recognize the Maduro presidency as the legal representative of Venezuela as of December 2019.

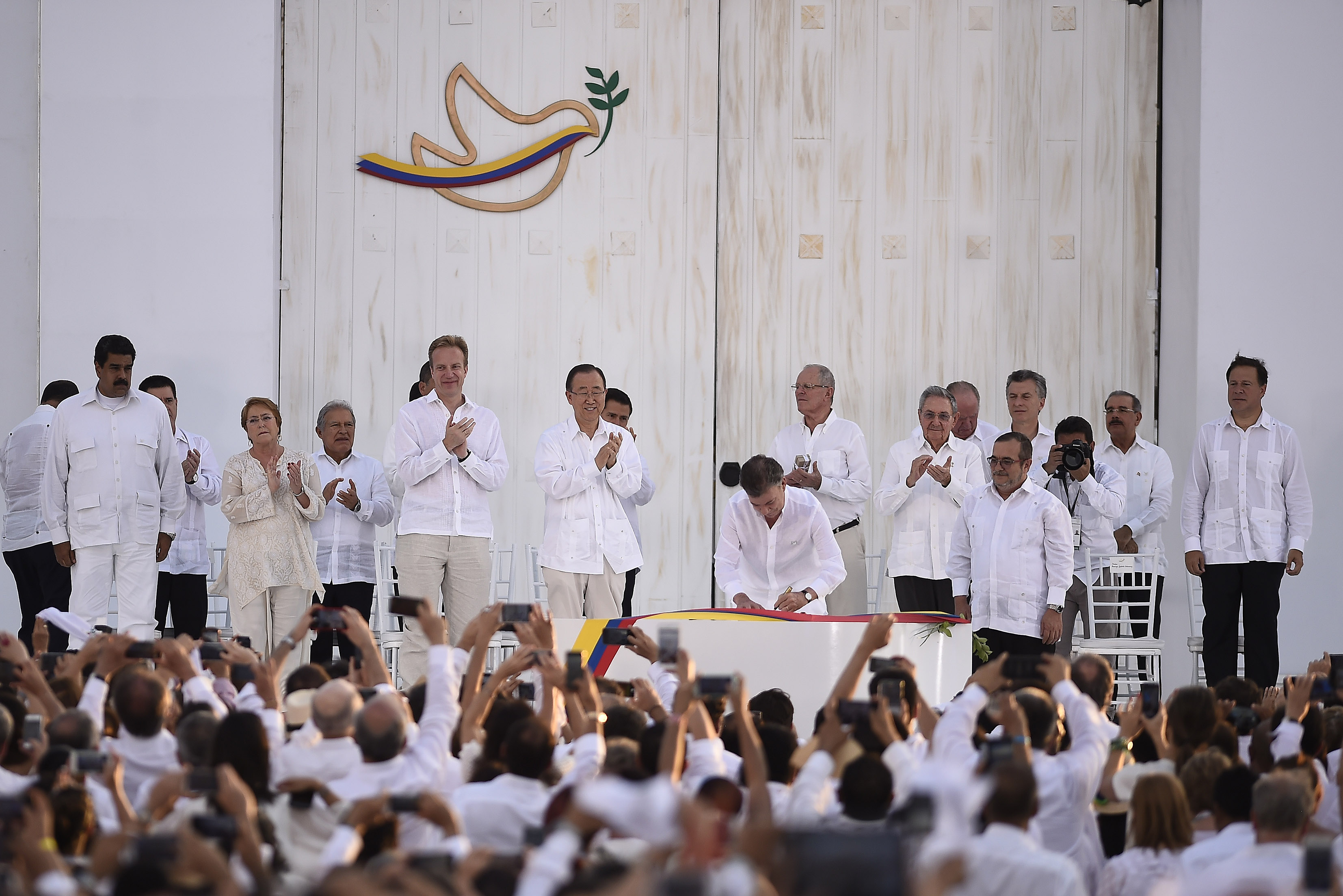
Maduro standing with other leaders in 2016.

In December 2022, three of the four main political parties (Justice First, Democratic Action and A New Era) backed and approved a reform to dissolve the interim government and create a commission of five members to manage foreign assets, as deputies sought a united strategy ahead of the presidential elections scheduled for 2024, stating that the interim government had failed to achieve the goals it had set.

In January 2026, the United States launched airstrikes across the coastline of Venezuela as part of Operation Southern Spear. Nicolás Maduro was captured and flown out of the country. Maduro asserted he remained President.

== Requirements ==
According to articles 227 and 229 of the Constitution of Venezuela, adopted in 1999, the following requirements must be met in order to become President of Venezuela:

- Being a Venezuelan citizen from birth and possessing no other nationality.
- Being at least 30 years old at the time of the election.
- Not being a subject to any conviction by final judgment.
- Not being a Minister, governor, mayor, or the vice president of the Republic from the day the candidacy is announced to the day of the election.

== Term limits ==
The current presidential term is for 6 years with the constitutionally guaranteed recourse of holding a popular recall referendum any time within the last three years of a presidential term. A 2009 referendum removed the previous restrictions which limited the president to 2 terms.

From 1958 to 1999, the presidential term was set at five years. A sitting president was not only barred from immediate reelection, but could not run again for 10 years (equivalent to two full terms) after leaving office.

== Recall ==
The president may be recalled after a specific time in office.

- 2004 Venezuelan recall referendum
- 2016 Venezuelan recall referendum (not approved)
- 2022 Venezuelan recall referendum project (rejected)

== Office-holders ==
Presidents of Venezuela who served under the 1864 constitution (starting with Juan Crisóstomo Falcón) bore the title of "President of the Union", instead of the usual "President of the Republic" still used today. Aside from that, all heads of state of the country since 1811 have held the title of "President of Venezuela", with minor variations regarding the official name of the country (which has changed four times since the restoration of the independence in 1830).

== See also ==
- List of presidents of Venezuela
- List of vice presidents of Venezuela
- History of Venezuela
- Politics of Venezuela
