= 2022 Venezuelan recall referendum project =

26 January 2022
Status	Rejected
Type	Activation of binding referendum

On 26 January 2022, the Venezuelan opposition promoted a recall referendum against the Nicolás Maduro government. The National Electoral Council ordered the collection of the required signatures, 20% of the electoral registry, to be carried out in a single day, the equivalent of having to collect four million signatures in twelve hours, which resulted in not reaching the required signatures, the referendum being declared inadmissible and making it impossible to summon for another recall for Maduro's second presidential term.

== History ==
=== Background ===
On May 25, 2021, the Venezuelan Movement for the Recall Referendum (MOVER) submitted to the National Electoral Council (CNE) a request to activate a recall referendum, after three years had passed since Nicolás Maduro's inauguration as president the day before.

=== Promotion ===
After the results of the 2022 Barinas state election, in which opposition candidate Sergio Garrido won, the "Venezuelan Movement for the Recall Referendum" called for mobilization to promote a recall referendum. Nicmer Evans, spokesperson for the movement, invited citizens to gather at the regional CNE offices on January 17 to ratify the request to activate a recall referendum against Nicolás Maduro's government, coinciding with the midpoint of his second presidential term. Meanwhile, the Communist Party of Venezuela released a statement announcing the start of an internal discussion process on this topic, expressing support for the constitutional right of Venezuelans to activate the referendum.

On January 17, MOVER members delivered the document requesting the activation of the recall referendum at the CNE headquarters in Caracas, as well as in some regional offices in various states of the country. That evening, the CNE announced the approval of three requests to begin the procedure for a possible recall referendum. The electoral body also announced that the collection of signatures equivalent to 1% of the electoral register would not take place; instead, the National Electoral Board would prepare a schedule allowing the promoters of the referendum to collect signatures equivalent to 20% of the electoral register.

=== Activation ===
On January 21, the CNE announced that on January 26, a weekday, the collection of the necessary signatures equivalent to 20% of the electoral register would begin in the 23 states of the country, at 1,200 authorized centers, from 6 a.m. to 6 p.m. The CNE was criticized for deciding that the signature collection would take place on a single day; Nicmer Evans called the process a "farce". MOVER announced the launch of a roadmap to pressure the National Electoral Council for a fair schedule.

Roberto Picón, rector of the CNE, withdrew his vote from the decision, denouncing it and explaining: "It would be necessary to process five voters per minute, for 12 hours, on all the machines in the country, without margin of error, without time to notify citizens of the collection points. The process will be carried out without a software audit to guarantee integrity and inviolability of the process, without time to appoint witnesses at the 1,200 points, without biosecurity measures. If convened, there would be queues of 300 people during the peak of Omicron."

Through a tweet, Juan Guaidó accused Nicolás Maduro of preventing citizens from exercising their right to activate a recall referendum and stated that the government "fears that Venezuela will become Barinas". Meanwhile, Avanzada Progresista proposed that the opposition push for a constitutional amendment with three specific points, stating that the recall referendum has "legal weaknesses" that are exploited by the government.

Diosdado Cabello, first vice president of the United Socialist Party of Venezuela (PSUV), announced that he would request from the electoral body the list with the identity of the applicants after the signature collection day. Media outlets recalled after the announcement the Lista Tascón, a list of signatories of the 2004 Venezuelan recall referendum; after the publication of the signatures, the applicants were subjected to discrimination, persecution, and dismissals.

During the signature collection day, turnout was low and information about the process was scarce. The CNE reported that the day proceeded normally.

=== CNE Rejection ===
One day after the signature collection, the CNE declared the recall referendum request inadmissible. Tania D'Amelio, rector of the National Electoral Council, stated that only 1.01% of the signatures had been collected and that no state reached the 20% required to activate the referendum. José Francisco Contreras, secretary general of Derecha Democrática, said that 50,000 signatures were collected and accused the United Socialist Party of Venezuela and the National Electoral Council of "sabotaging" the citizens' initiative, while also stating that the opposition led by Juan Guaidó shares responsibility.

MOVER announced that it would file an annulment appeal before the Supreme Tribunal of Justice against the signature collection schedule, denouncing that the time frame made the collection unfeasible.

== See also ==
- 2016 Venezuelan recall referendum project
- 2004 Venezuelan recall referendum
- Tascón List
