= Ramon Rivero (animator) =

New Zealand animator

Ramon Rivero is an animation director, digital puppeteer and computer animator best known for his work on the 2001 film The Lord of the Rings: The Fellowship of the Ring.

Born in Mexico, he started his animation career in the 1980s as puppeteer, puppet maker and set designer for the TV show Titeradas, screened in the Channel 13 Yucatán, under the direction and mentorship of Wilberth Herrera,

Ramon moved to New Zealand in the late 1980s where he was Nominated for Best Performance in a Supporting Role at the 1990 New Zealand Film Awards for his work as a supervising puppeteer on the 1989 Peter Jackson film Meet the Feebles, He also was the supervising puppeteer on Jackson's 1992 film Braindead.

Mr Rivero later followed Jackson to Weta Digital, where he worked for four years. At Weta, he worked as lead performance animator on the special effects team for The Lord of the Rings: The Fellowship of the Ring, using digital puppetry to help Andy Serkis portray the character Gollum and to help create the troll which attacks the protagonists in the mines of Moria.

In 2007 he worked as Animation Director for the TV series Freefonix.
