= Unión Nacional de Trabajadores de Venezuela =

Federation of Venezuelan labor unions

UNT
- National Workers' Union of Venezuela
- Unión Nacional de Trabajadores de Venezuela
- Founded: 2003
- Headquarters: Caracas, Venezuela
- Location: Venezuela

The National Workers' Union of Venezuela (Spanish: Unión Nacional de Trabajadores de Venezuela, UNT) is a federation of labor unions in Venezuela that was founded in 2003. The union was created by supporters of Venezuelan president Hugo Chávez to challenge the Workers' Confederation of Venezuela (CTV).

== See also ==
- Confederación de Trabajadores de Venezuela
- Central Socialista de Trabajadores
