= Súmate =

Venezuelan volunteer vote-monitoring group

Logo of Súmate

Súmate (Spanish for "Join Up") is a Venezuelan volunteer civil association founded in 2002 by María Corina Machado and Alejandro Plaz. Súmate describes itself as a vote-monitoring group; it has also been described as an election-monitoring group.

== Mission and values ==
Súmate is a non-governmental organization (NGO) whose stated aim is to promote the free exercise of citizen's political rights, and the discussion of matters of public interest. The group's mission is to promote, defend, facilitate, and back the political rights accorded to citizens by the Constitution of Venezuela.

Súmate's espoused values are:

- The guarantee of civil and political freedom and rights
- Impartial and independent citizen participation in democratic processes
- Professional volunteerism with a high level of citizen participation
- Organizational transparency and efficacy

Other projects are the consolidation of a national network of volunteers; analysis of voter registration; planning and execution of parallel vote counts to strengthen confidence in electoral processes; and educational programs.

== History ==
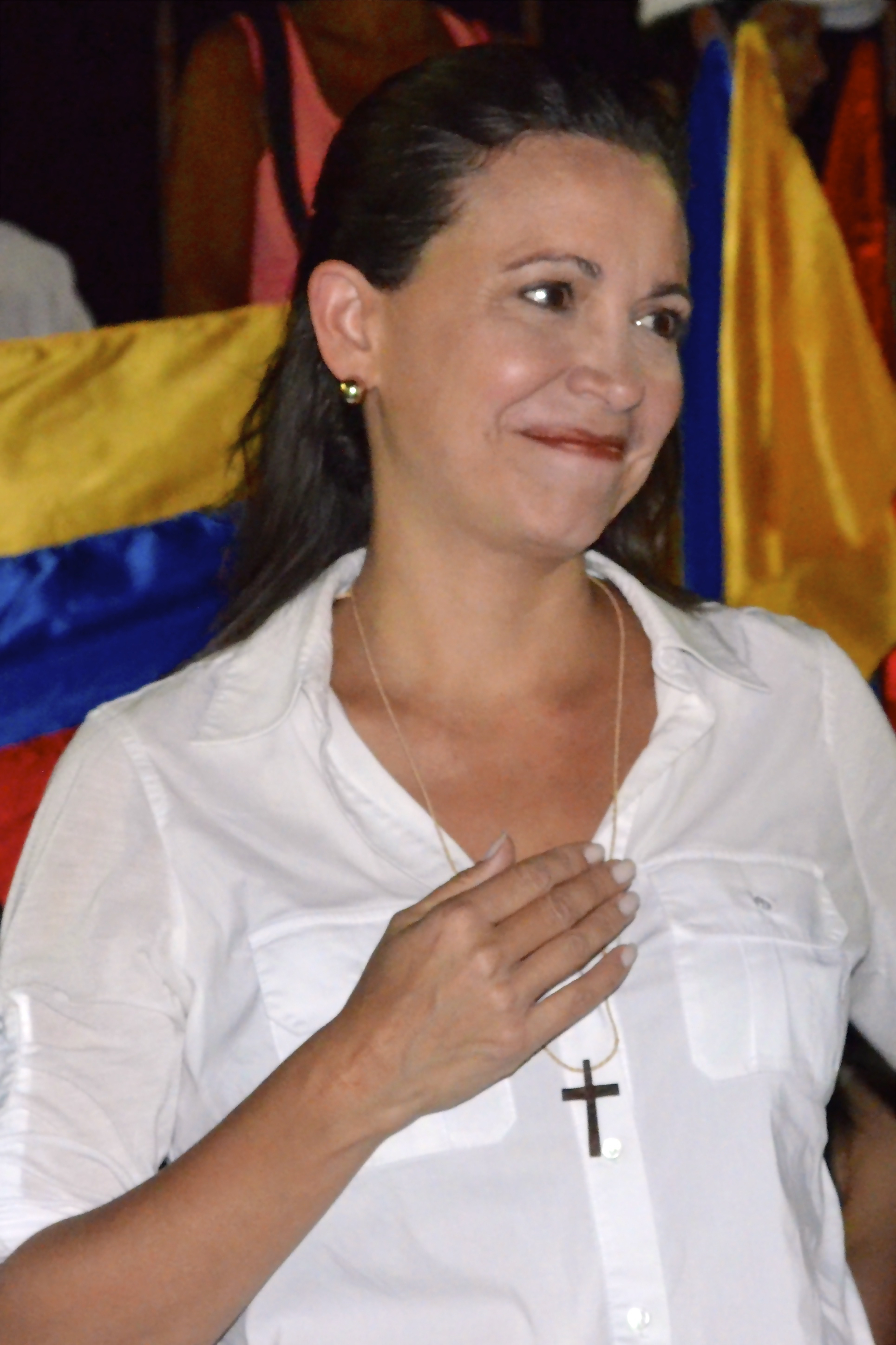
María Corina Machado, a founder of Súmate

Hugo Chávez was elected President of Venezuela in 1998. Participation was 64%, with 36% of the electorate abstaining, resulting in a Chávez victory with 35% of the total electorate. In 1999, a new Constitution of Venezuela was approved, making Chávez eligible to run for president again in 2000, for a six-year term; and again in 2006, for another six years. This could result in a Chávez presidency of 14 years, compared to the previous presidential term limit of five years. He won the 2000 election with 60% of the votes cast, 33% of the total electorate, and 44% abstention.

These changes were made to the Constitution and electoral processes based on elections with an overwhelmingly support for Chávez but unprecedented voter abstention—a "poor showing" with most staying away from the polls.

Hugo Chávez's Election Results
— 1998 presidential election —
Candidate	Votes	%
Chávez:	3,673,685	56%
Salas:	2,613,161	40%
Valid votes:	6,537,304	—
Abstention:	3,971,239	36%

Hugo Chávez's Election Results
— 1999 referendum — Enact the new constitution?
Option	Votes	%
Yes:	3,301,475	72%
No:	1,298,105	28%
Abstention:	6,041,743	56%

Hugo Chávez's Election Results
— 2000 presidential election —
Candidate	Votes	%
Chávez:	3,757,773	60%
Arias:	2,359,459	38%
Valid votes:	6,288,578	—
Abstention:	5,120,464	44%

Súmate was founded with an expressed goal of achieving a high level of citizen participation in Venezuelan elections. According to The Washington Post, Machado and Plaz had a hurried encounter in a hotel lobby in 2001, where they shared their concern about the course that was being shaped for Venezuela. Machado said, "Something clicked. I had this unsettling feeling that I could not stay at home and watch the country get polarized and collapse.... We had to keep the electoral process but change the course, to give Venezuelans the chance to count ourselves, to dissipate tensions before they built up. It was a choice of ballots over bullets." According to Súmate, it is "not concerned with who governs but rather that those in power respect the rule of law." Súmate was originally composed of a group of professionals, but by 2004 it grew to include 30,000 volunteers from across Venezuela and all walks of life.

=== JuRecall referendum, 2004 ===
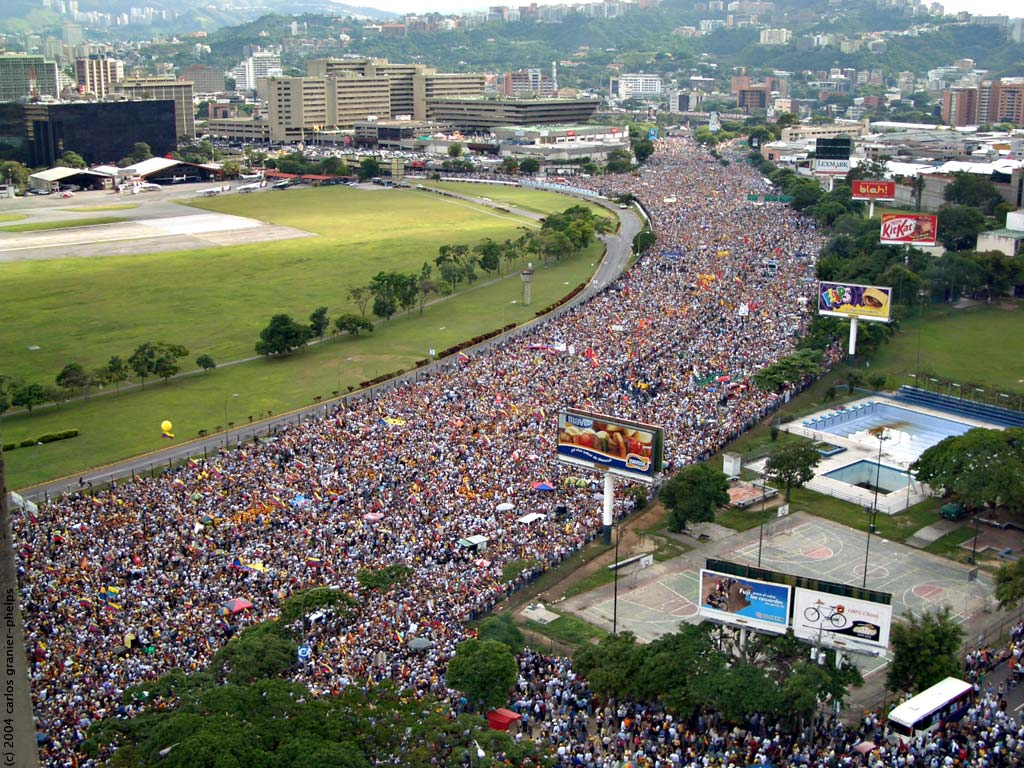
A rally in favor of the 2004 Venezuelan referendum to recall Hugo Chávez in the capital, Caracas

In 2003, Súmate organized a campaign to force a recall referendum revoking the remainder of the term in office of President Chávez, as provided for under Article 72 of the Constitution of Venezuela, which permits citizens to request a recall if signatures are collected from 20% of the electorate.

The recall vote was held on 15 August 2004. A record number of voters turned out but the recall was defeated with a 59% "no" vote. The Carter Center concluded the results were accurate, but European Union observers did not oversee the referendum, saying too many restrictions were put on their participation by the government.

An exit poll by US company Penn, Schoen & Berland Associates (PSB) predicted that Chávez would lose by 20%, whereas the election results showed him to have won by 20%. Schoen commented, "I think it was a massive fraud". PSB used Súmate personnel as fieldworkers. Publication or broadcast of exit polls was banned by electoral authorities, but results of the PSB poll went out to media outlets and opposition offices several hours before polls closed. Jimmy Carter said that Súmate "deliberately distributed this erroneous exit poll data in order to build up, not only the expectation of victory, but also to influence the people still standing in line".

Following the recall vote, Súmate requested that Ricardo Hausmann of Harvard University and Roberto Rigobón of MIT perform a statistical analysis analyzing how fraud could have occurred during the referendum. They concluded that the vote samples audited by the government were not a random representation of all precincts and that opposition witnesses and international observers were not allowed near the computer hub on election day. CEPR, a left-leaning think tank based in Washington, reports that other economists have called the Harvard/MIT assumptions about how fraud was conducted unlikely.

Chávez branded the leaders of Súmate as "conspirators", "coup plotters" and "lackeys of the U.S. government". After the referendum, members of Súmate were charged with treason and conspiracy, under Article 132 of the Venezuelan Penal Code, accused of receiving financial support for their activities from the National Endowment for Democracy (NED). The trial has been postponed several times.

The criminal charges triggered concern from Human Rights Watch and the World Movement for Democracy. The latter accused the government of Venezuela of illegally "withholding case files from the defendants, using depositions of the defendants that were made before the charges against them were known, and refusing to accede to requests of the Supreme Court in the case." Tom Casey, acting spokesman for the State Department, expressed disappointment about the court's decision to try the founders and said the charges were "without merit."

Over 70 individuals, including prominent world leaders, wrote to Chávez on 11 November 2004, pointing out that "proceeding against nongovernmental organizations for receiving democratic assistance is a violation of both the Inter-American Democratic Charter and the Warsaw Declaration of the Community of Democracies, a document your government signed along with over 100 others four years ago." The letter indicated that the prosecution, "as well as the proposal to criminalize democracy assistance from abroad" are both "clearly inconsistent with international democratic norms and constitute a grave threat to democracy." Signatories of the letter included Czech President Václav Havel, former U.S. Secretary of State Madeleine Albright, U.S. Senator John McCain, former Canadian Prime Minister Kim Campbell, former Nicaraguan President Violeta Chamorro, former Prime Minister of Bulgaria Philip Dimitrov, and Richard Goldstone, former prosecutor of the International Criminal Tribunal for the former Yugoslavia.

A 2008 Human Rights Watch report expressed concern at the gravity of the charges sought by the prosecution against Súmate, saying that the sought a conviction for the crime of “conspiracy to destroy the nation’s republican form of government,” for a maximum 16-year prison sentence. The report explained that both Súmate and the NED insisted that the funds, a total of $53 400 US dollars, were not used for electoral activities but rather to educate people about the recall referendum, and arguing that even if it supported electoral activity, "the recall referendum was itself a legal process envisaged in the 1999 Constitution" and "not an act of subversion". The report continues saying that in July 2005 a court in Caracas ordered a trial for its Vice President María Corina Machado, her colleague Alejandro Plaz, as well as Luis Enrique Palacios and Ricardo Estévez. In February 2006, the report says, the process was suspended, after the court of appeals ruled that the trial judge had committed due process violations, including refusing to empanel a jury or to allow key defense witnesses to testify, including the NED directors. The report concludes saying that the appeals court ordered a new jury trial, but that it had been postponed repeatedly and that by 2008, after three years, the process against the NGO was still open.

=== Presidential elections, 2006 ===
Súmate recommended procedures for a primary, to be held on 13 August 2006, to choose the opposition candidate for the 3 December 2006 presidential elections. Teodoro Petkoff, a Chávez critic, said that Súmate's procedure was authoritarian, comparing it to the Carmona Decree. Nine other candidates agreed to the terms for holding a primary, confirming their desire to allow the citizens to choose the opposition candidate. Another candidate condemned Petkoff's remarks against Súmate, saying that Petkoff's statements didn't help the country, and explaining that the conditions for holding a primary had been previously discussed between all of the candidates, including Petkoff. On 9 August, Súmate announced that the 13 August primary election would not be held, since the candidates had decided to back Manuel Rosales as the single opposition candidate. Machado said that the primary "initiative accomplished its goal and that Súmate would continue working to ensure clean elections and respect for citizens' rights."

On 8 December 2006, Súmate announced that their count and audits of the final election results matched the official count of the Venezuelan National Electoral Council, that showed a landslide victory for Hugo Chávez, highlighting that "balloting was not clean, transparent or reliable." Machado said the government had stacked the odds against the opposition in the pre-election period, including "a climate of collective intimidation" due to the use of fingerprint-reading machines and an unaudited register of voters, and that if irregularities had been corrected, they could have impacted the final result. She clarified that the impact could not be assessed, saying "We will know only the truth about what Venezuelans really feel, the day when clean elections are held in Venezuela."

== Personnel ==
Plaz is a Venezuelan engineer and management consultant, who holds three master's degrees (two from Stanford University), and was a Senior partner for McKinsey & Company in Latin America, before taking a leave of absence to co-found Súmate. Machado was hailed as "the best of womankind and the difficult times many women face around the globe" on a list of Women the World Should Know for International Women's Day.

Ricardo Estévez is one of the founders of Súmate, according to El Pitazo. In 2012 he withdrew from Súmate to run for the position of rector of the National Electoral Council of Venezuela as an independent.

== See also ==
- Voto Joven
