= 2019 Venezuelan Amnesty Law =

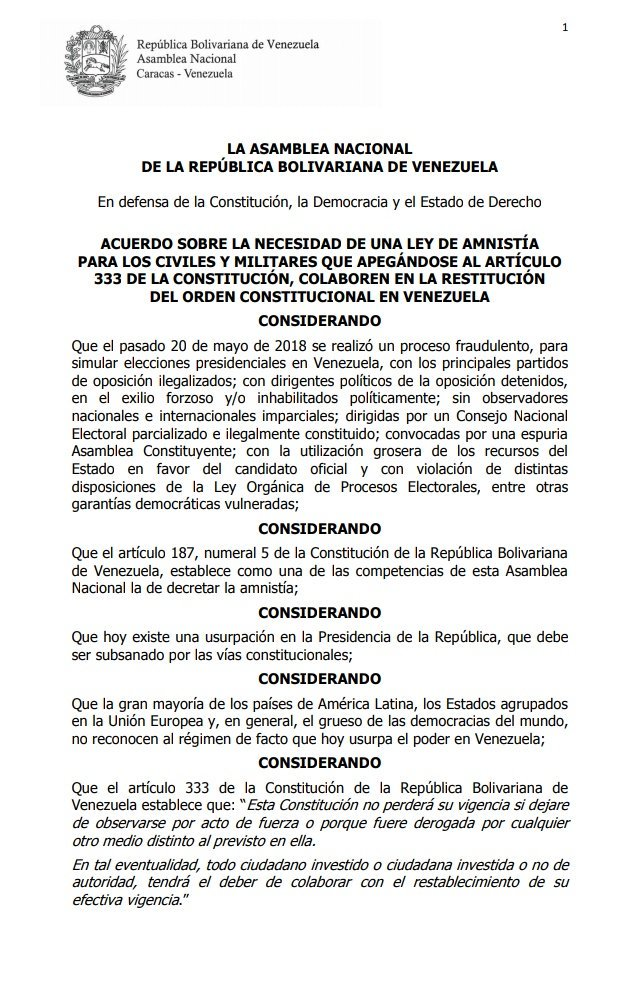
Amnesty and Constitutional Guarantees Law

The 2019 Venezuelan Amnesty Law (Spanish: Ley de Amnistía a nombre de la Asamblea Nacional de Venezuela) is a law promulgated by the National Assembly of Venezuela that was created to give amnesty to civilians, military and other officials identified as prisoners, persecuted and political exiles for acts committed from 1 January 1999 until the promulgation of the law, and that included political acts such as rebellion and sedition. Its objective was to eliminate some legal effects that could endanger the consolidation of a new government during the 2019 Venezuelan presidential crisis and for military personnel and authorities who help to "restore constitutional order".

Human Rights Watch has called for an amendment of the law as it may provide amnesty for public workers or military involved in serious human rights violations.
