= Central Socialista de Trabajadores =

Venezuelan trade union federation

CST
- Workers' Socialist Centre of Venezuela
- Central Socialista de Trabajadores y Trabajadoras de Venezuela
- Founded: 2008
- Headquarters: Caracas, Venezuela
- Location: Venezuela

The Workers' Socialist Centre (Spanish: Central Socialista de Trabajadores y Trabajadoras de Venezuela, CST) is a federation of labor unions in Venezuela that was founded in August 2008, representing 1,280,000 affiliated workers. It explicitly aims to support a transition to socialism in Venezuela.

== See also ==
- Unión Nacional de Trabajadores de Venezuela
