= Tascón List =

Political blacklist in Venezuela

The Tascón List is a list of millions of signatures of Venezuelans who asked in 2003 and 2004 for the recall of the President of Venezuela, Hugo Chávez. The list, published online by National Assembly member Luis Tascón, was used by the Venezuelan government to discriminate against those who have signed it.

== Background ==
Whoever signs against Chávez will be registered for history because they are going to have their name, surname, identity number, and fingerprint.

— President Hugo Chávez

In 2003, Chávez opponents created a movement to recall President Chávez from the presidency under laws designated in the Venezuelan constitution. It occurred when the economy was stagnant and Chávez's approval ratings were falling even among the poor. Initially the National Electoral Council, filled with Chávez allies, denied a list with 3 million signatures calling it flawed, stating that it had to be redone. On 17 October 2003, President Chávez said on Aló Presidente that "those who sign against Chávez are signing against their country" and "against the future". Chávez, using the largely increased oil sales and initiation of Bolivarian missions, rallied support to overcome the recall movement. Despite keeping control, Chávez sought to remove his political opposition in order to maintain power.

== Publication ==
In February 2004, on the TV program Aló Presidente 180, President Chávez announced that he had signed a document asking the National Electoral Council (CNE) to provide copies of all the signatures of the petitioners for the referendum, in order to expose the opposition's "mega fraud". Due to a lack of funds on the part of the CNE, Luis Tascón, a representative of the ruling party in the legislature, led the collection of photocopies of the signatures.

Tascón subsequently published on his website a database of the more than 2,400,000 Venezuelans who had signed the petition, together with their national identity card numbers (cédula). Tascón said he posted the list in order to support the verification of signatures, saying that publication of the list provided a way for those who appeared on it, but had not signed, to register a complaint with the CNE.

On 20 April 2004 the CNE itself published a list of signers, and created a website where signers could determine the status of their signature (accepted, rejected, or in need of verification).

== Use ==
The list allowed the government to pursue official sectarianism. Venezuelans who signed against Chávez were denied jobs, benefits, and documents, and often subjected to harassment. Once the list was posted, Chávez, on a Venezolana de Televisión broadcast, encouraged use of the website to "verify illicit use of national identity cards". Roger Capella, Minister of Health declared that "those who signed against President Chávez would be fired because they are committing an act of terrorism". There was a public outcry, in particular by the organization Súmate, and because of reports that people who worked for the government were fired, denied work, or denied issuance of official documents because of their appearance on the list. In July 2004, access to the database under management of Comando Maisanta was granted to members of the "Batallones Bolivarianos de Internet (BBI)" (Internet Bolivarian Battalions), which previously had to register on Tascón's website to gain access under the strict requisite that they had not signed the petition for the referendum.

== Existence ==
Luis Tascón later removed the list from his website, after widespread accusations that it was being used to discriminate against those who had signed the petition. On 16 April 2005 Chávez declared the "Tascón List must be archived and buried" and continued "I say that, because I keep receiving some letters, among the many I get, that make me think that still in some places they have the Tascón List on their tables to determine if somebody is going to work or not". This move was described as having "been for the cameras", with government employees still reporting that the Tascón List existed and was transformed into a software called Maisanta, which was used to cross-reference every job applicant. Some Venezuelans have had to pay to be removed from the Maisanta program.

== Legal claims ==
A case was opened on the Venezuelan Supreme Court against Tascón in May 2005.

In March 2006, three former government employees introduced a case against the Chávez administration at the Inter-American Commission on Human Rights, arguing that José Vicente Rangel, the country's vice president, ordered their dismissal because their names appeared on the Tascón List and, therefore, were victims of discrimination for political reasons.

== See also ==
- Black list
