= Confederación de Trabajadores de Venezuela =

Venezuelan federation of labour unions

CTV
- Venezuelan Confederation of Workers
- Confederación de Trabajadores de Venezuela
- Founded: 1936
- Headquarters: Caracas, Venezuela
- Location: Venezuela
- Affiliations: ITUC
- Website: www.ctv.org.ve

The Confederación de Trabajadores de Venezuela (CTV, English: Confederation of Workers of Venezuela) is a federation of labor unions in Venezuela.

== History ==
The union federation has been a consistent and key opponent of Venezuelan President Hugo Chávez. In the year 2001, two years after his first election to President, Chávez's government ordered the union federation to undertake its first-ever direct leadership elections. Although the Supreme Court refused to certify the results, the winner Carlos Ortega assumed the presidency. The International Labour Organization (ILO) and International Confederation of Free Trade Unions (ICFTU) condemned Chávez's interference in the affairs of free trade unions.

In 2002 and 2003, the CTV received funding from the United States' National Endowment for Democracy via the American Center for International Labor Solidarity.

In 2003, a new union federation, the Unión Nacional de Trabajadores de Venezuela (UNT, National Union of Workers) was started by people in the labor movement who supported Chávez. Some unions disaffiliated with the CTV and affiliated with the UNT.

== See also ==
- Central Socialista de Trabajadores
- Unión Nacional de Trabajadores de Venezuela
- List of trade unions
