= Hugo Chávez =

President of Venezuela from 1999 to 2013

- Chávez in 2011

52nd President of Venezuela
- In office 14 April 2002 – 5 March 2013
- Vice President: See list: Diosdado Cabello (April 2002); José Vicente Rangel (2002–2007); Jorge Rodríguez (2007–2008); Ramón Carrizales (2008–2010); Elías Jaua (2010–2012); Nicolás Maduro (2012–2013)
- Preceded by: Diosdado Cabello (acting)
- Succeeded by: Nicolás Maduro
- In office 2 February 1999 – 11 April 2002
- Vice President: See list: Isaías Rodríguez (Jan–Dec 2000); Adina Bastidas (2000–2002); Diosdado Cabello (Jan–Apr 2002)
- Preceded by: Rafael Caldera
- Succeeded by: Pedro Carmona (acting)

President of the United Socialist Party of Venezuela
- In office 14 March 2007 – 5 March 2013 (Note: Eternal President since 26 July 2014)
- Vice President: Diosdado Cabello (2011–2013)
- Preceded by: Position established
- Succeeded by: Nicolás Maduro

Personal details
- Born: Hugo Rafael Chávez Frías; 28 July 1954 Sabaneta, Barinas, Venezuela
- Died: 5 March 2013 (aged 58) Caracas, Venezuela
- Resting place: Cuartel de la Montaña, Caracas
- Party: PSUV (2007–2013)
- Other political affiliations: Fifth Republic Movement (1997–2007); Revolutionary Bolivarian Movement-200 (1982–1997)
- Spouses: Nancy Colmenares (m. 1977; div. 1995); Marisabel Rodríguez (m. 1997; div. 2004)
- Domestic partner(s): Bexhi Segura (2004–2007); Nidia Fajardo (2007–2013)
- Children: 6, including María
- Parents: Hugo de los Reyes Chávez; Elena Frías
- Education: Military Academy of Venezuela

Military service
- Branch/service: Venezuelan Army
- Years of service: 1971–1992; 1999–2013
- Rank: Lieutenant colonel; Commander-in-chief

Hugo Rafael Chávez Frías (Note: /ˈtʃɑːvɛz/ CHAH-vez; Spanish pronunciation: [uɣ̞o ˈt͡ʃaβ̞es] Full name: [ˈuɣo rafaˈel ˈtʃaβes ˈfɾi.as]) (28 July 1954 – 5 March 2013) was a Venezuelan politician, revolutionary, and military officer who was the president of Venezuela from 1999 until his death in 2013. (Note: Except for a brief period of forty-seven hours in 2002) Chávez changed the country's name from the Republic of Venezuela to the Bolivarian Republic of Venezuela, creating the fifth republic in Venezuelan history and led the Bolivarian Revolution. Chávez was the leader of the Fifth Republic Movement political party from its foundation in 1997 until it merged with several other parties to form the United Socialist Party of Venezuela (PSUV), the ruling party of Venezuela since 2007. The political ideology centered around Chávez's ideas is known as Chavismo.

Born into a middle-class family in Sabaneta, Barinas, Chávez became a career military officer. After becoming dissatisfied with the Venezuelan political system based on the Puntofijo Pact, he founded the Revolutionary Bolivarian Movement-200 (MBR-200) in the early 1980s. Chávez led the MBR-200 in its unsuccessful coup d'état against the Democratic Action government of President Carlos Andrés Pérez in 1992, for which he was imprisoned. Pardoned from prison two years later, he founded the Fifth Republic Movement political party, and then receiving 56.2% of the vote, was elected president of Venezuela in 1998.

Chávez was reelected in the 2000 Venezuelan general election with 59.8% of the vote and again in the 2006 Venezuelan presidential election, with 62.8% of the vote. After winning his fourth term as president in the 2012 Venezuelan presidential election with 55.1% of the vote, he was to be sworn in on 10 January 2013. However, the inauguration was cancelled due to his cancer treatment, and on 5 March at age 58, he died in Caracas.

Following the adoption of the 1999 Venezuelan Constitution, Chávez focused on enacting social reforms as part of the Bolivarian Revolution. Using record-high oil revenues of the 2000s, his government nationalized key industries, created participatory democratic Communal Councils and implemented social programs known as the Bolivarian missions to expand access to food, housing, healthcare and education. While these initiatives led to temporary improvements in poverty reduction and social welfare during periods of high oil revenue, their reliance on state control and centralized planning exposed significant structural weaknesses as oil prices declined.

The high oil profits coinciding with the start of Chávez's presidency resulted in temporary improvements in areas such as poverty, literacy, income equality and quality of life between primarily 2003 and 2007, though extensive changes in structural inequalities did not occur. On 2 June 2010, Chávez declared an "economic war" on Venezuela's upper classes due to shortages, arguably beginning the crisis in Venezuela. By Chávez's death in 2013, economic actions performed by his government during the preceding decade, such as deficit spending and price controls, proved to be unsustainable, with Venezuela's economy faltering. At the same time, poverty, inflation and shortages increased.

Under Chávez, Venezuela experienced democratic backsliding, as he suppressed the press, manipulated electoral laws, and arrested and exiled government critics. His use of enabling acts and his government's use of propaganda were controversial. Chávez's presidency saw significant increases in the country's murder rate.

Across the political spectrum, Chávez is regarded as one of the most influential and controversial politicians in the modern history of Venezuela and Latin America. His 14-year presidency marked the start of the socialist "pink tide" sweeping Latin America—he supported Latin American and Caribbean cooperation and was instrumental in setting up the pan-regional Union of South American Nations, the Community of Latin American and Caribbean States, the Bolivarian Alliance for the Americas, the Bank of the South and the regional television network TeleSUR.

Internationally, Chávez aligned himself with the Marxist–Leninist governments of Fidel and then Raúl Castro in Cuba, as well as the socialist governments of Evo Morales in Bolivia, Rafael Correa in Ecuador and Daniel Ortega in Nicaragua. Chávez's ideas, programs, and style form the basis of Chavismo, a political ideology closely associated with Bolivarianism and socialism of the 21st century. Chávez described his policies as anti-imperialist, being a prominent adversary of the United States's foreign policy as well as a vocal opponent of neoliberalism and laissez-faire capitalism. He described himself as a Marxist.

== Early life ==
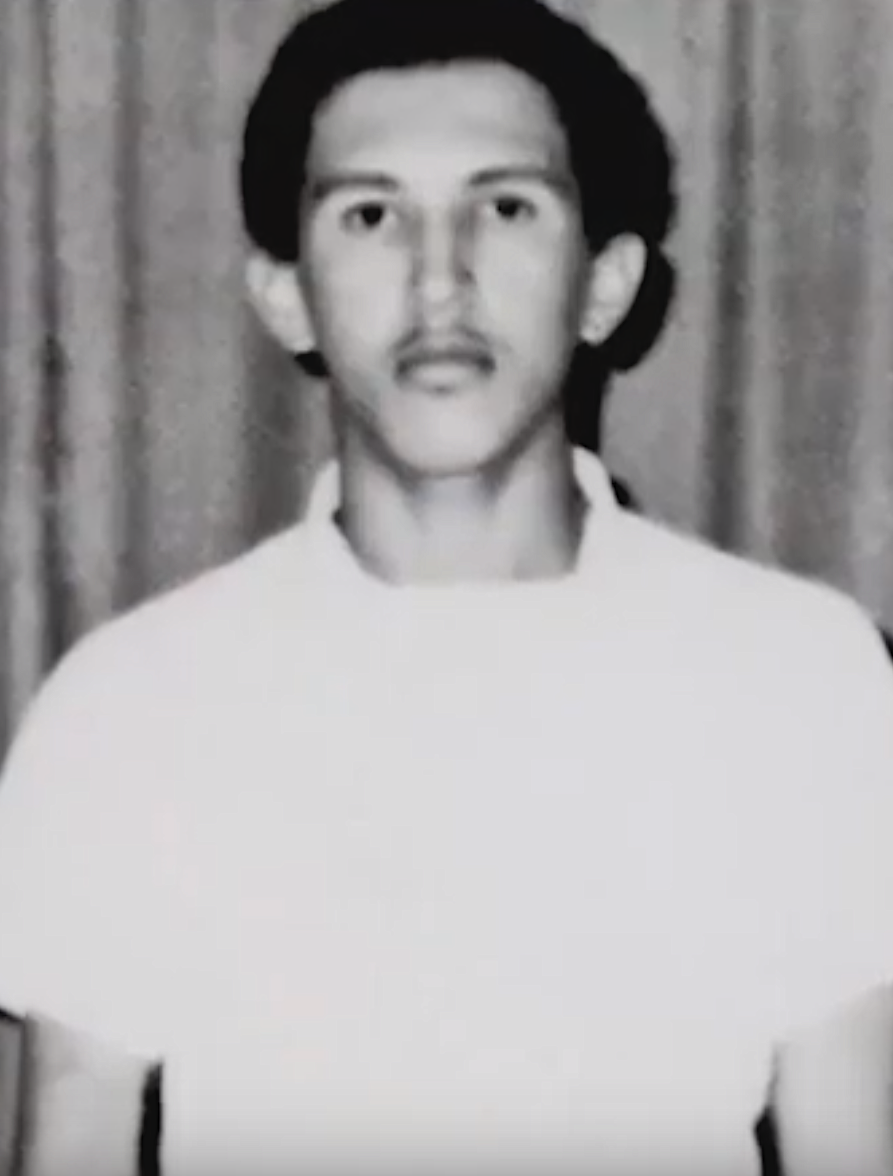
Chávez as an adolescent

Chávez was born on 28 July 1954 in his paternal grandmother Rosa Inés Chávez's home, a modest three-room house located in the rural village Sabaneta, Barinas State. The Chávez family were of Amerindian, Afro-Venezuelan, Spanish and Italian descent. His parents, Hugo de los Reyes Chávez – described as a proud COPEI member– and Elena Frías de Chávez, were schoolteachers who lived in the small village of Los Rastrojos.

Hugo was born the second of seven children. Chávez's childhood of supposed poverty has been disputed as he possibly changed the story of his background for political reasons. Attending the Julián Pino Elementary School, Chávez was particularly interested in the 19th-century federalist general Ezequiel Zamora, in whose army his own great-great-grandfather had served. With no high school in their area, Hugo's parents sent Hugo and his older brother Adán to live with their grandmother Rosa, who lived in a lower middle class subsidized home provided by the government, where they attended Daniel O'Leary High School in the mid-1960s. His father, despite having the salary of a teacher, helped pay for college for Chávez and his siblings.

== Military career ==
=== Military academy ===
Aged 17, Chávez studied at the Venezuelan Academy of Military Sciences in Caracas, following a curriculum known as the Andrés Bello Plan, instituted by a group of progressive, nationalistic military officers. This new curriculum encouraged students to learn not only military routines and tactics but also a wide variety of other topics, and to do so civilian professors were brought in from other universities to give lectures to the military cadets.

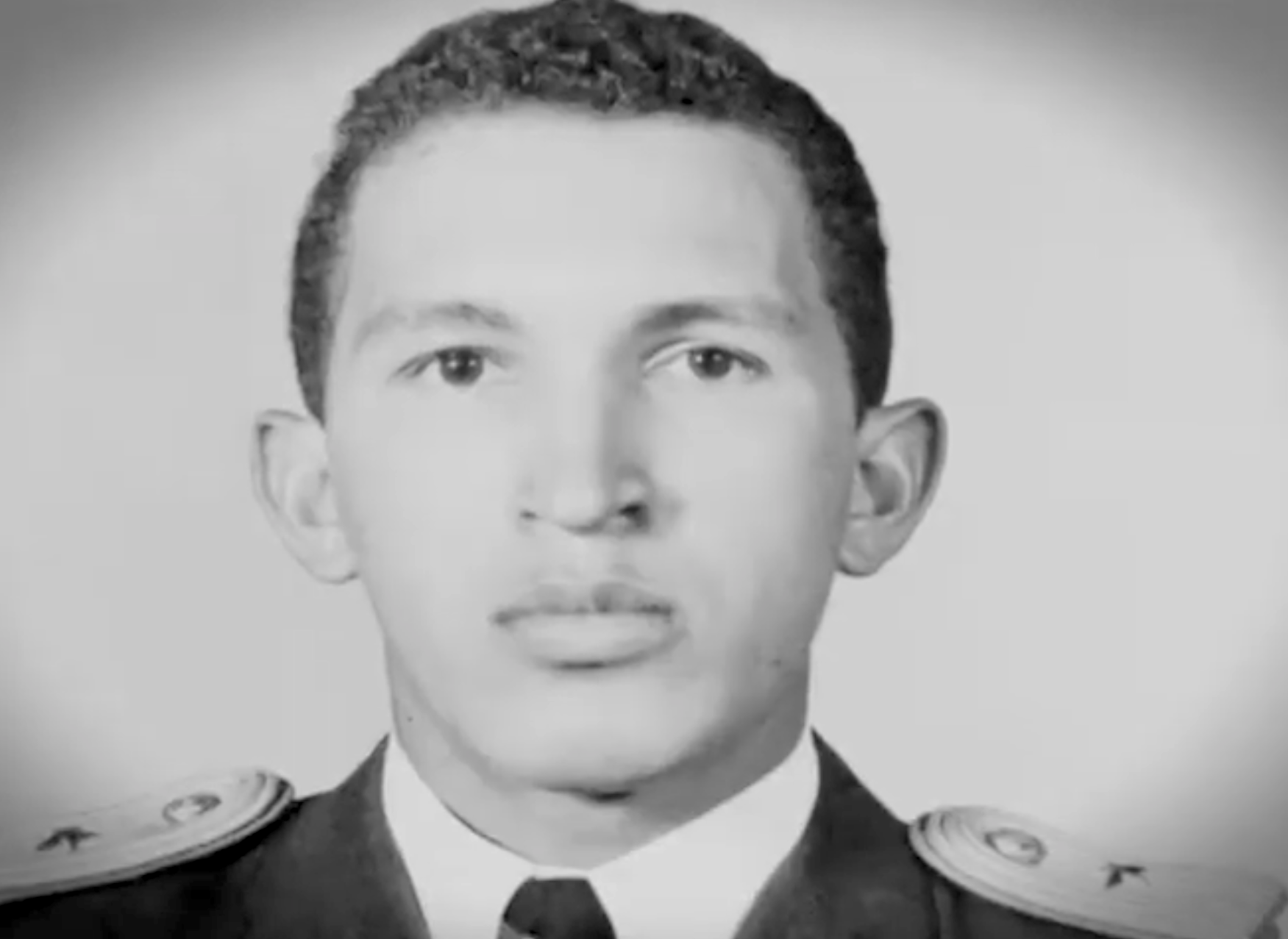
Chávez as a student in the military academy

Living in Caracas, he began to get involved in activities outside of the military school, playing baseball and softball with the Criollitos de Venezuela team, progressing with them to the Venezuelan National Baseball Championships. He also wrote poetry, fiction, and drama, and painted. He also became interested in the Marxist revolutionary Che Guevara (1928–1967) after reading his memoir The Diary of Che Guevara. In 1974, he was selected to be a representative in the commemorations for the 150th anniversary of the Battle of Ayacucho in Peru, the conflict in which Simon Bolívar's lieutenant, Antonio José de Sucre, defeated royalist forces during the Peruvian War of Independence. In Peru, Chávez heard the leftist president, General Juan Velasco Alvarado (1910–1977), speak, and was inspired by Velasco's ideas that the military should act in the interests of the working classes when the ruling classes were perceived as corrupt.

Befriending the son of Maximum Leader Omar Torrijos, the leftist dictator of Panama, Chávez visited Panama, where he met with Torrijos, and was impressed with his land reform program that was designed to benefit the peasants. Influenced by Torrijos and Velasco he saw the potential for military generals to seize control of a government when the civilian authorities were perceived as serving the interests of only the wealthy elites. Chávez later said, "With Torrijos, I became a Torrijist. With Velasco I became a Velasquist. And with Pinochet, I became an anti-Pinochetist". In 1975, Chávez graduated from the military academy as one of the top graduates of the year.

=== Early military career ===
Following his graduation, Chávez was stationed as a communications officer at a counterinsurgency unit in Barinas.

In 1977, Chávez's unit was transferred to Anzoátegui, where they were involved in battling the Red Flag Party, a Marxist–Hoxhaist insurgency group. After intervening to prevent the beating of an alleged insurgent by other soldiers, Chávez began to have his doubts about the army.

In 1977, he founded a revolutionary movement within the armed forces, in the hope that he could one day introduce a leftist government to Venezuela: the Venezuelan People's Liberation Army (Ejército de Liberación del Pueblo de Venezuela, or ELPV), consisted of him and a handful of his fellow soldiers who had no immediate plans for direct action, though they knew they wanted a middle way between the right-wing policies of the government and the far-left position of the Red Flag. Nevertheless, hoping to gain an alliance with civilian leftist groups in Venezuela, Chávez set up clandestine meetings with various prominent Marxists, including Alfredo Maneiro (the founder of the Radical Cause) and Douglas Bravo.

=== Bolivarian Revolutionary Army-200 ===
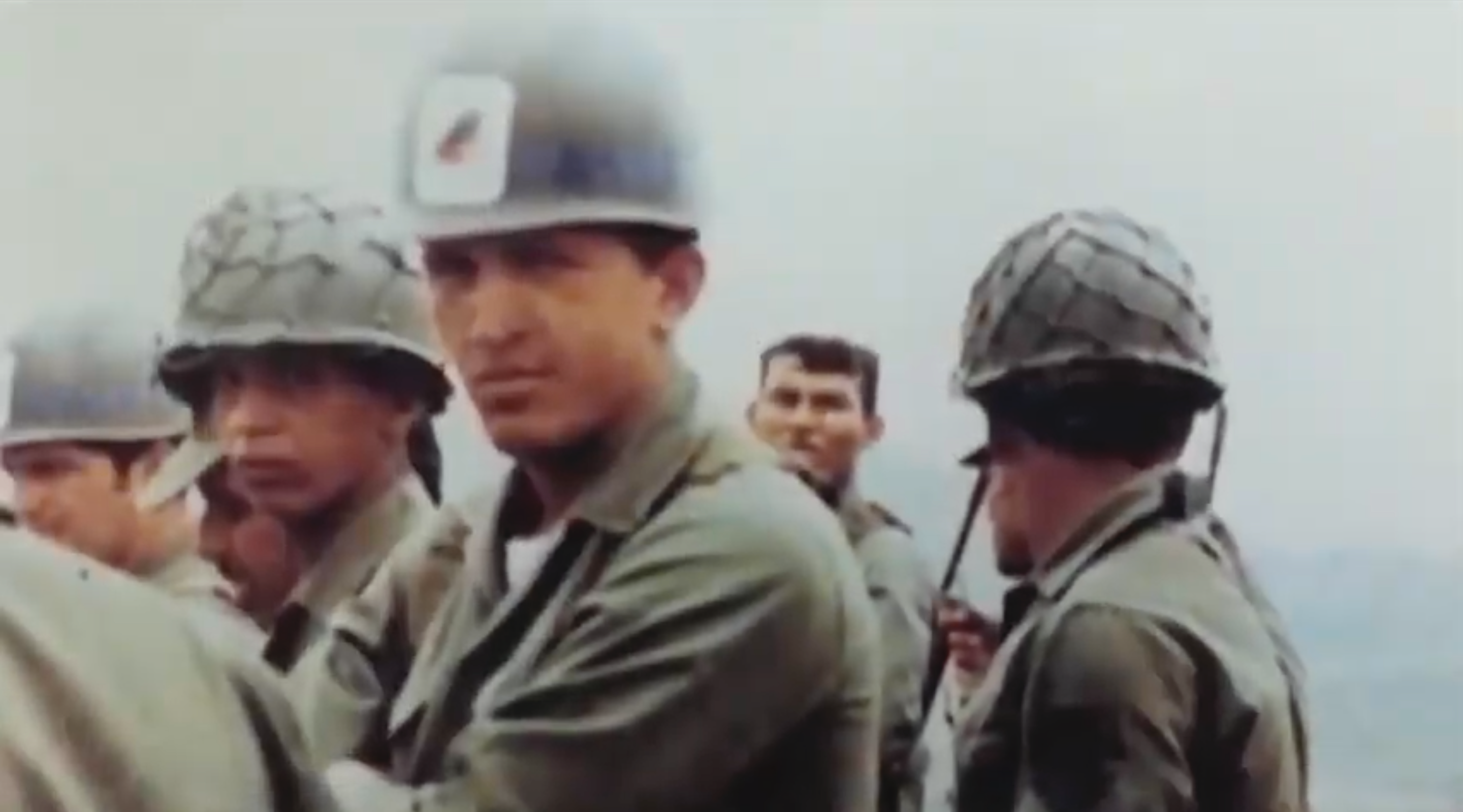
Chávez while serving in the Venezuelan Army

Five years after his creation of the ELPV, Chávez went on to form a new secretive cell within the military, the Bolivarian Revolutionary Army-200 (EBR-200), later redesignated the Revolutionary Bolivarian Movement-200 (MBR-200). He was inspired by Simón Bolívar, Simón Rodríguez and Ezequiel Zamora, who became known as the "three roots of the tree" of the MBR-200.

In 1984, he met Herma Marksman, a recently divorced history teacher with whom he had an affair that lasted several years. During this time Francisco Arias Cárdenas, a soldier interested in liberation theology, also joined MBR-200. After some time, some senior military officers became suspicious of Chávez and reassigned him so that he would not be able to gain any more fresh new recruits from the academy. He was sent to take command of the remote barracks at Elorza in Apure State.

==== 1992 coup attempt ====
In 1989, Carlos Andrés Pérez was elected president, and though he had promised to oppose the International Monetary Fund's policies, once he got into office he enacted economic policies supported by the IMF, angering the public. In an attempt to stop widespread lootings and protests that followed his spending cuts, known as El Caracazo, Pérez initiated Plan Ávila, a military contingency plan by the Venezuelan Army to maintain public order, and an outbreak of violent repression unfolded. Though members of Chávez's MBR-200 movement allegedly participated in the crackdown, Chávez did not, since he was then hospitalized with chicken pox. He later condemned the event as "genocide".

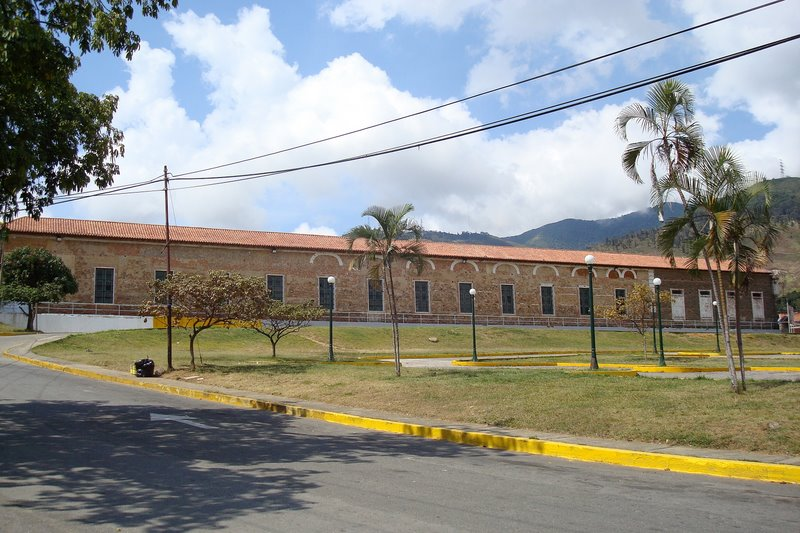
The San Carlos military stockade, where Chávez was held following the 1992 coup attempt

Chávez began preparing for a military coup d'état known as Operation Zamora. The plan involved members of the military overwhelming military locations and communication installations and then establishing Rafael Caldera in power once Pérez was captured and assassinated. Chávez delayed the MBR-200 coup, initially planned for December, until the early twilight hours of 4 February 1992.

On that date five army units under Chávez's command moved into urban Caracas. Despite years of planning, the coup quickly encountered trouble since Chávez commanded the loyalty of less than 10% of Venezuela's military. After numerous betrayals, defections, errors, and other unforeseen circumstances, Chávez and a small group of rebels found themselves hiding in the Military Museum, unable to communicate with other members of their team. Pérez managed to escape Miraflores Palace. Officially, thirty-two civilians, police officers and soldiers were killed, and fifty soldiers and some eighty civilians injured during the ensuing violence.

Chávez gave himself up to the government and appeared on television, in uniform, to call on the remaining coup members to lay down their arms. Chávez remarked in his speech that they had failed only "por ahora" (for now). Venezuelans, particularly poor ones, began seeing him as someone who stood up against government corruption and kleptocracy. The coup "flopped militarily—and dozens died—but made him a media star", noted Rory Carroll of The Guardian.

Chávez was arrested and imprisoned at the San Carlos military stockade, wracked with guilt and feeling responsible for the failure of the coup. Pro-Chávez demonstrations outside San Carlos led to his transfer to Yare Prison. Another unsuccessful coup against the government occurred in November, with the fighting during the coups resulting in the deaths of at least 143 people and perhaps as many as several hundred. Pérez was impeached a year later, charged with malfeasance and misappropriating funds.

== Political rise ==
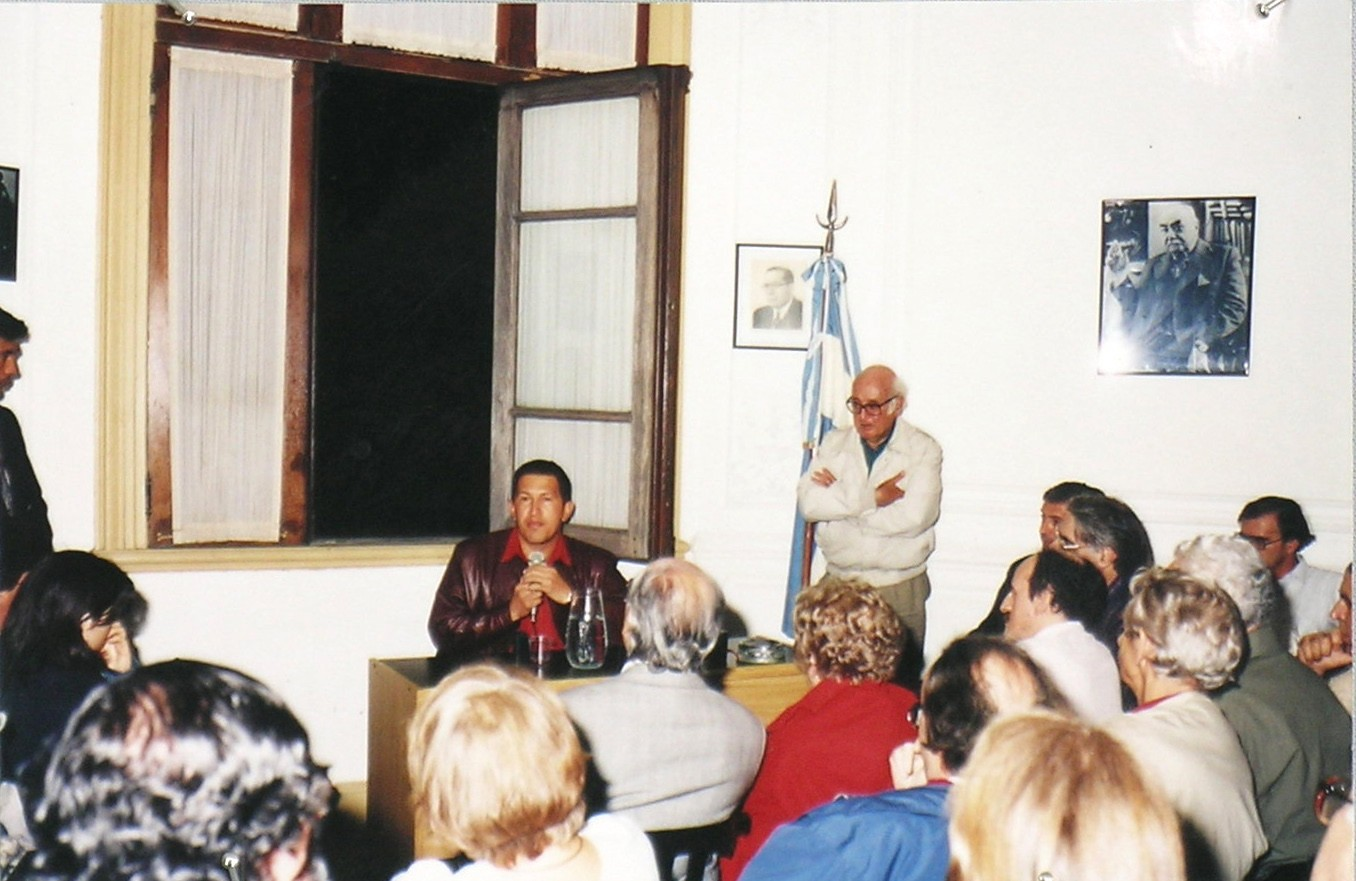
Chávez speaking at an event in Buenos Aires in October 1995

While Chávez and the other senior members of the MBR-200 were in prison, his relationship with Herma Marksman broke up in July 1993. In 1994, Rafael Caldera (1916–2009) of the centrist National Convergence Party who allegedly had knowledge of the coup was elected president and soon afterward he freed Chávez and the other imprisoned MBR-200 members, though Caldera banned them from returning to the military. After his release, on 14 December 1994, Chávez visited Cuba during the Special Period, where he was received by Fidel Castro with head of state honors. During his visit, Chávez gave a speech at the Aula Magna of the University of Havana before Fidel and the Cuban high hierarchy where, among other things, he said "We have a long term strategic project, in which the Cubans have and would have much to contribute" and "it is a project of a twenty to forty year horizon, a sovereign economic model".

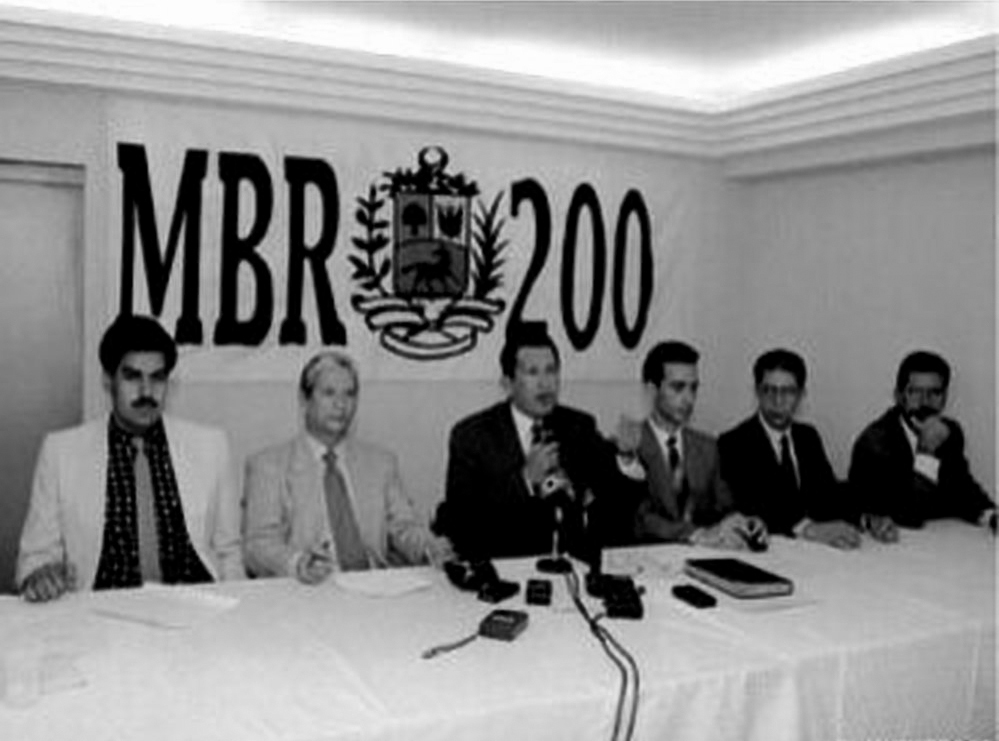
A 1997 image of MBR-200 members meeting (Nicolás Maduro is seen on the far left while Chávez is seen speaking in the center)

Travelling around Latin America in search of foreign support for his Bolivarian movement, he visited Argentina, Uruguay, Chile, Colombia, and Cuba, where he met Castro and became friends with him. According to journalist Patricia Poleo, during his stay in Colombia, he spent six months receiving guerrilla training and establishing contacts with the FARC and National Liberation Army (Colombia) Marxist guerrilla groups, and even adopted a nom de guerre Comandante Centeno.

By now Chávez was a supporter of taking military action, believing that the oligarchy would never allow him and his supporters to win an election. Chávez and his supporters later founded a political party, the Fifth Republic Movement (MVR – Movimiento Quinta República) in July 1997 to support Chávez's candidacy in the 1998 presidential election. Chávez went on a tour around the country. On his tours, he met Marisabel Rodríguez, who would give birth to their daughter shortly before becoming his second wife in 1997.

=== 1998 election ===
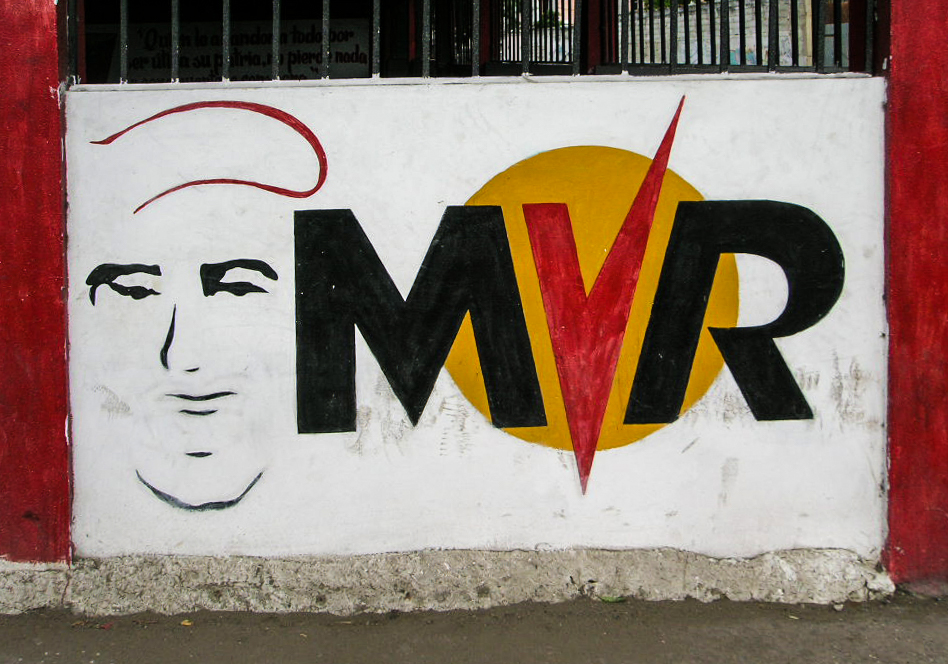
A painted mural in support of the Fifth Republic Movement (MVR) found in Barcelona, Anzoátegui, Venezuela

At the start of the election run-up, front runner Irene Sáez was backed by one of Venezuela's two primary political parties, Copei. Chávez's revolutionary rhetoric gained him support from Patria Para Todos (Homeland for All), the Partido Comunista Venezolano (Venezuelan Communist Party) and the Movimiento al Socialismo (Movement for Socialism). Chávez received support from different sectors: the lower class felt that Chávez cared about their needs and would offer a solution to their problems; members of the middle class, frustrated with corruption and wishing for a strong-handed government, also supported; Chávez also received support from members of the old left, as well as the members of the militarist right wing, some of them nostalgic for the dictatorship of Marcos Pérez Jiménez. By May 1998, Chávez's support had risen to 30% in polls, and by August he was registering 39%. Voter turnout was 63%, and Chávez won the election with 56.2% of the vote.

== Presidency (1999–2013) ==
=== First presidential term: 2 February 1999 – 10 January 2001 ===
First presidential inauguration of Hugo Chávez
- Date: 2 February 1999; 27 years ago
- Venue: Palacio Federal Legislativo
- Location: Caracas, Venezuela
- Also known as: 1999 presidential inauguration of Hugo Chávez; Establishment of the Bolivarian Republic of Venezuela; Establishment of the Fifth Republic of Venezuela; Dissolution of the Republic of Venezuela; Dissolution of the Fourth Republic of Venezuela
- Participants: Hugo Chávez; 52nd president of Venezuela — Assuming office
- Outcome: Calling of the 1999 Constituent Assembly election; Dissolution of the Republic of Venezuela; Establishment of the Bolivarian Republic of Venezuela

Chávez's presidential inauguration took place on 2 February 1999. He deviated from the usual words of the presidential oath when he took it, proclaiming: "I swear before God and my people that upon this moribund constitution I will drive forth the necessary democratic transformations so that the new republic will have a Magna Carta befitting these new times". Soon after being established into office, Chávez spent much of his time attempting to abolish existing checks and balances in Venezuela. He appointed new figures to government posts, adding leftist allies to key positions and "army colleagues were given a far bigger say in the day-to-day running of the country". For instance, he put Revolutionary Bolivarian Movement-200 founder Jesús Urdaneta in charge of the National Directorate of Intelligence and Prevention Services and made Hernán Grüber Odremán, one of the 1992 coup leaders, governor of the Federal District of Caracas. His critics referred to these government officials as the "Boliburguesía" or "Bolivarian bourgeoisie", and highlighted that it "included few people with experience in public administration". The number of his immediate family members in Venezuelan politics also led to accusations of nepotism. Chávez appointed businessman Roberto Mandini president of the state-run oil company Petroleos de Venezuela.

Although Chávez did not believe "in this paradigm of the Western capitalist, bourgeois democratic world",, as he put it in 1998, he initially believed that capitalism was still a valid economic model for Venezuela, but only Rhenish capitalism, not neoliberalism. This was arguably demonstrated earlier during his first presidential speech in February 1999, when Chávez declared

Our project is neither statist nor neo-liberal; we are exploring the middle ground, where the invisible hand of the market joins up with the visible hand of the state: as much state as necessary, and as much market as possible.

Low oil prices made Chavez's government reliant on international free markets during his first months in office, when he showed pragmatism and political moderation, and continued to encourage foreign investment in Venezuela. During a visit to the United States in 1999, he rang the closing bell at the New York Stock Exchange. His administration held formal talks with the International Monetary Fund until oil prices rose enough to let the government rule out the need for any financial assistance.

Beginning 27 February 1999, the tenth anniversary of the Caracazo, Chávez set into motion a social welfare program called Plan Bolívar 2000. He said he had allotted $20.8 million for the plan. The plan involved 70,000 soldiers, sailors and members of the air force repairing roads and hospitals, removing stagnant water that offered breeding areas for disease-carrying mosquitoes, offering free medical care and vaccinations, and selling food at low prices. Several scandals later affected the program as allegations of corruption were formulated against generals involved in the plan and that significant amounts of money had been diverted.

==== Constitutional reform ====
Chávez called a public referendum, which he hoped would support his plans to form a constituent assembly of representatives from across Venezuela and from indigenous tribal groups to rewrite the Venezuelan constitution. Chávez said he had to run again; "Venezuela's socialist revolution was like an unfinished painting and he was the artist", he said, while someone else "could have another vision, start to alter the contours of the painting".

There was a low turnout of 37.65% and an abstention of 62.35%, 88% of the voters supported his proposal.

Chávez called an election on 25 July to elect the members of the constituent assembly. Over 900 of the 1,171 candidates standing for election were Chávez opponents. To elect the members of the assembly, Chávez used a formula designed by mathematical experts and politicians, known at the time as the kino (lottery) or the "keys of Chávez". Chávez obtained 51% of the votes, but his supporters took 95% of the seats, 125 in total, including all of the seats assigned to indigenous groups, while the opposition won six seats.

On 12 August 1999, the new constituent assembly voted to give themselves the power to abolish government institutions and to dismiss officials who were perceived as corrupt or as operating only in their own interests. Opponents of the Chávez regime argued that it was dictatorial. Most jurists believed that the new constituent assembly had become the country's "supreme authority" and that all other institutions were subordinate to it. The assembly also declared a "judicial emergency" and granted itself the power to overhaul the judicial system. The Supreme Court ruled that the assembly did indeed have this authority, and was replaced in the 1999 Constitution with the Supreme Tribunal of Justice. The constituent assembly put together a new constitution, which was voted on at a referendum in December 1999. Seventy-two percent of those who voted approved of the new constitution. There was a low turnout and an abstention vote of over 50%. The new constitution provided protections for the environment and indigenous people, socioeconomic guarantees and state benefits, while giving greater powers to the president. The presidential term was extended to six years, and a president was allowed to serve for two consecutive terms. Previously, a sitting president could not run for reelection for 10 years after leaving office. It also replaced the bicameral Congress with a unicameral Legislative Assembly and gave the president the power to legislate on citizen rights, to promote military officers and to oversee economic and financial matters. The assembly also gave the military a mandated role in the government by empowering it to ensure public order and aid national development, which the previous constitution had expressly forbidden.

In the new constitution, the country, until then officially known as the Republic of Venezuela, was renamed the Bolivarian Republic of Venezuela (República Bolivariana de Venezuela) at Chávez's request. Chávez's actions following the ratification the 1999 Venezuelan constitution government weakened many of Venezuela's checks and balances, allowing the government to control every branch of the Venezuelan government for over 15 years after it passed until the Venezuelan parliamentary election in 2015.

In May 2000 he launched his own Sunday morning radio show, Aló Presidente (Hello, President), on the state radio network. This followed an earlier Thursday night television show, De Frente con el Presidente (Face to Face with the President). He founded two newspapers, El Correo del Presidente (The President's Post), founded in July, for which he acted as editor-in-chief, and Vea (See), another newspaper, as well as Question magazine and Vive TV. El Correo was later shut down among accusations of corruption and mismanagement. In his television and radio shows, he answered calls from citizens, discussed his latest policies, sang songs and told jokes.

In June 2000 he separated from his wife Marisabel, and their divorce was finalised in January 2004.

=== Second presidential term: 10 January 2001 – 10 January 2007 ===
Under the new constitution, it was legally required that new elections be held in order to re-legitimize the government and president. This presidential election in July 2000 would be a part of a greater "megaelection", the first time in the country's history that the president, governors, national and regional congressmen, mayors and councilmen would be voted for on the same day. Going into the elections, Chávez had control of all three branches of government. For the position of president, Chávez's closest challenger proved to be his former friend and co-conspirator in the 1992 coup, Francisco Arias Cárdenas, who since becoming a governor of Zulia state had turned towards the political centre and begun to denounce Chávez as autocratic. Some of his supporters feared that he had alienated those in the middle class and the Roman Catholic Church hierarchy who had formerly supported him. Chávez was re-elected with 60% of the vote, a larger majority than his 1998 electoral victory.

That year, Chávez improved ideological ties with the Cuban government of Fidel Castro by signing an agreement under which Venezuela would supply Cuba with 53,000 barrels of oil per day at preferential rates, in return receiving 20,000 trained Cuban medics and educators. In the ensuing decade, this would be increased to 90,000 barrels a day (in exchange for 40,000 Cuban medics and teachers), dramatically aiding the Caribbean island's economy and standard of living after its "Special Period" of the 1990s. However, Venezuela's growing alliance with Cuba came at the same time as a deteriorating relationship with the United States. Chávez opposed the 2001 American-led invasion of Afghanistan in response to the 11 September attacks against the U.S. by Islamist militants. In late 2001, Chávez showed pictures on his television show of children said to be killed in a bombing attack. He commented that "They are not to blame for the terrorism of Osama bin Laden or anyone else", called on the American government to end "the massacre of the innocents", and described the war as "fighting terrorism with terrorism." The U.S. government responded negatively to the comments, which were picked up by the media worldwide and recalled its ambassador for consultations.

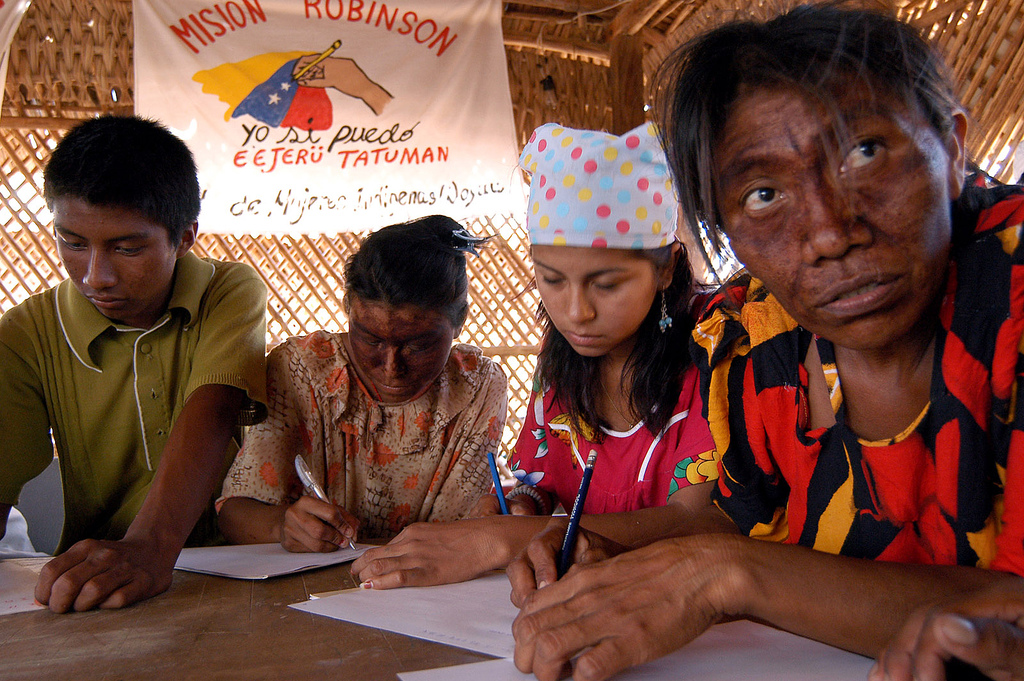
Chávez's second term in office saw the implementation of social missions, such as this one to eliminate illiteracy in Venezuela.

Meanwhile, the 2000 elections had led to Chávez's supporters gaining 101 out of 165 seats in the Venezuelan National Assembly, and so in November 2001 they voted to allow him to pass 49 social and economic decrees. This move antagonized the opposition movement particularly strongly. At the start of the 21st century, Venezuela was the world's fifth largest exporter of crude oil, with oil accounting for 85% of the country's exports, therefore dominating the country's economy. Before the election of Chávez, the state-run oil company, Petróleos de Venezuela S.A. (PDVSA) ran autonomously, making oil decisions based on internal guidance to increase profits. Once he came to power, Chávez started directing PDVSA and effectively turned it into a direct government arm whose profits would be injected into social spending. The result of this was the creation of "Bolivarian missions", oil funded social programs targeting poverty, literacy, hunger, and more. In 2001, the government introduced a new Hydrocarbons Law through which it sought to gain greater state control over the oil industry. The law increased the transnational companies taxation in oil extraction activities to 30% and set the minimum state participation in "mixed companies" at 51%, whereby the state-run oil company, Petróleos de Venezuela S.A. (PDVSA), could have joint control with private companies over industry. By 2006, all of the 32 operating agreements signed with private companies during the 1990s had been converted from being primarily or privately run to being at least 51% controlled by PDVSA. Chávez had also removed many of the managers and executives of PDVSA and replaced them with political allies, stripping the state-owned company expertise.

==== Opposition and the Coordinadora Democrática ====
Much of Chávez's opposition originated from the response to the "cubanization" of Venezuela. Chávez's popularity dropped due to his relationship with Fidel Castro and Cuba, with Chávez attempting to make Venezuela in Cuba's image. Chávez, following Castro's example, consolidated the country's bicameral legislature into a single National Assembly that gave him more power and created community groups of loyal supporters allegedly trained as paramilitaries. Such actions created great fear among Venezuelans who felt like they were tricked and that Chávez had dictatorial goals.

The first organized protest against the Bolivarian government occurred in January 2001, when the Chávez administration tried to implement educational reforms through the proposed Resolution 259 and Decree 1.011, which would have seen the publication of textbooks with a heavy Bolivarian bias. Parents noticed that such textbooks were really Cuban books filled with revolutionary propaganda outfitted with different covers. The protest movement, which was primarily by middle-class parents whose children went to privately run schools, marched to central Caracas shouting out the slogan Con mis hijos no te metas ("Don't mess with my children"). Although the protesters were denounced by Chávez, who called them "selfish and individualistic", the protest was successful enough for the government to retract the proposed education reforms and instead enter into a consensus-based educational program with the opposition.

Later into 2001, an organization known as the Coordinadora Democrática de Acción Cívica (Democratic Coordinator, CD) was founded, under which the Venezuelan opposition political parties, corporate powers, most of the country's media, the Venezuelan Federation of Chambers of Commerce, the Institutional Military Front and the Central Workers Union all united to oppose Chávez's regime. The prominent businessman Pedro Carmona (1941–) was chosen as the CD's leader.

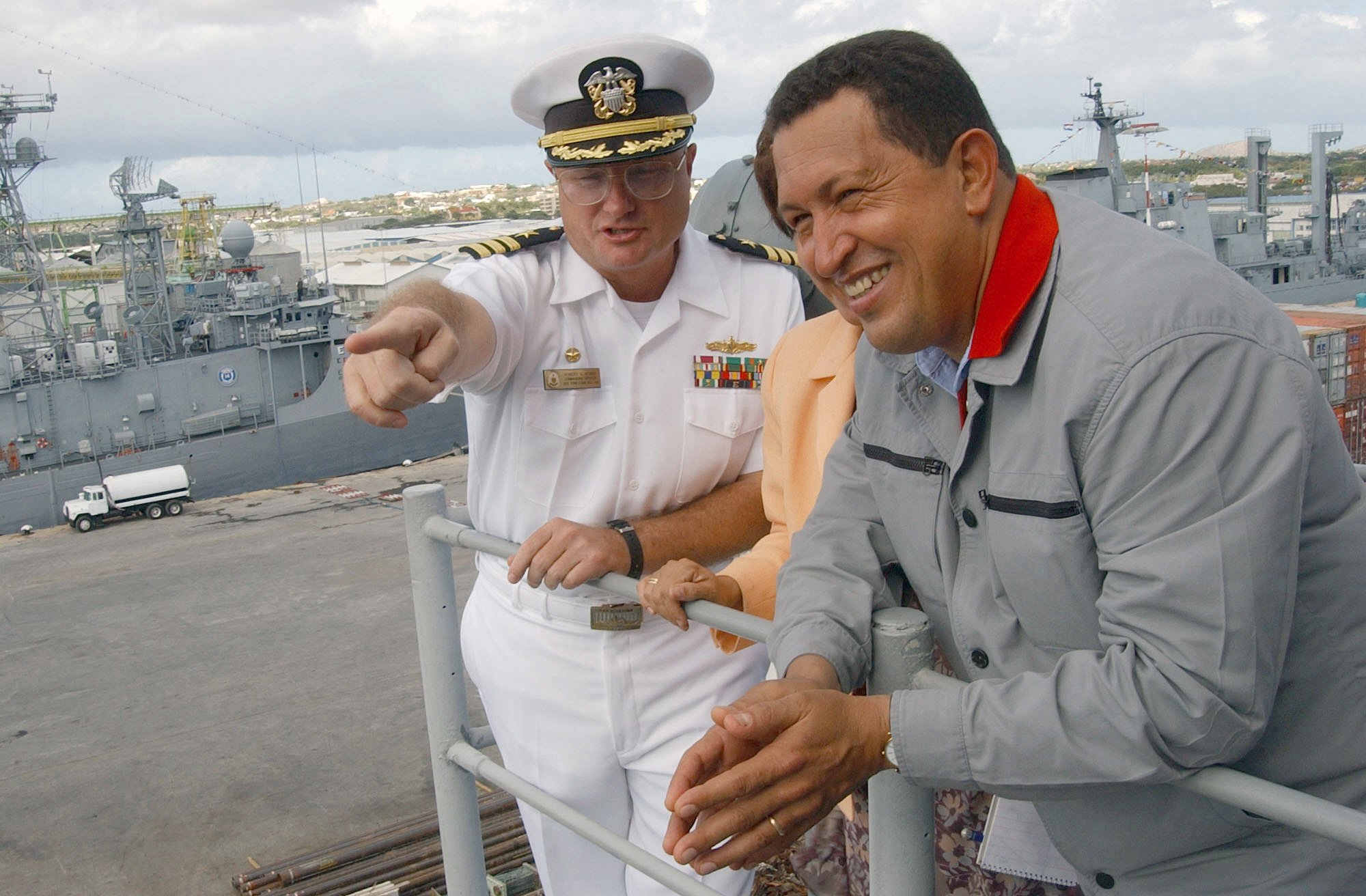
Chávez visiting the USS Yorktown, a U.S. Navy ship docked at Curaçao in the Netherlands Antilles, in 2002

The Coordinadora Democrática and other opponents of Chávez's Bolivarian government accused it of trying to turn Venezuela from a democracy into a dictatorship by centralising power among its supporters in the Constituent Assembly and granting Chávez increasingly autocratic powers. Many of them pointed to Chávez's personal friendship with Cuba's Fidel Castro and the one-party socialist government in Cuba as a sign of where the Bolivarian government was taking Venezuela.

==== Coup, strikes and the recall referendum ====
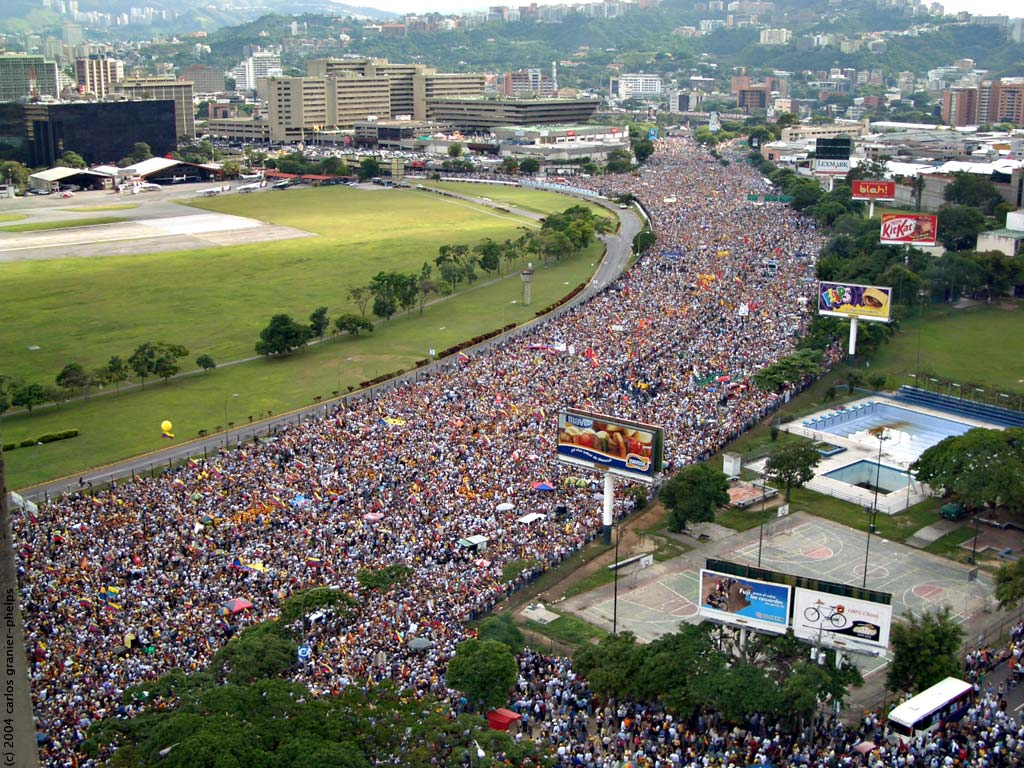
A 2004 rally against Chávez in Caracas, demanding his removal from the presidency

Chávez sought to make PDVSA his main source of funds for political projects and replaced oil experts with political allies to support him with this initiative. In early-2002, he placed a leftist professor as the president of PDVSA. In April 2002, Chávez appointed his allies to head the PDVSA and replaced the company's board of directors with loyalists who had "little or no experience in the oil industry", mocking the PDVSA executives on television as he fired them. Anger with Chávez's decisions led to civil unrest in Venezuela, which culminated in an attempted coup. On 11 April 2002, during a march headed to the presidential palace, nineteen people were killed, and over 110 were wounded.

Chávez believed that the best way to stay in power was to implement Plan Ávila. Military officers, including General Raúl Baduel, a founder of Chávez's MBR-200, then decided that they had to pull support from Chávez to deter a massacre and shortly after at 8:00 pm, Vásquez Velasco, together with other ranking army officers, declared that Chávez had lost his support. Chávez agreed to be detained and was transferred by army escort to La Orchila; business leader Pedro Carmona declared himself president of an interim government. Carmona abolished the 1999 constitution and appointed a governing committee. Protests in support of Chávez along with insufficient support for Carmona's government quickly led to Carmona's resignation, and Chávez was returned to power on 14 April.

Chávez's response was to moderate his approach, implementing a new economic team that appeared to be more centrist and reinstated the old board of directors and managers of the state oil company Petróleos de Venezuela S.A. (PDVSA), whose replacement had been one of the reasons for the coup. At the same time, the Bolivarian government began to increase the country's military capacity, purchasing 100,000 AK-47 assault rifles and several helicopters from Russia, as well as a number of Super Tucano light attack and training planes from Brazil. Troop numbers were also increased.

Chávez faced a two-month management strike at the PDVSA. The Chávez government's response was to fire about 19,000 striking employees for abandoning their posts and then employing retired workers, foreign contractors, and the military to do their jobs instead. The firing of over 18,000 employees by Chávez damaged Venezuela's oil industry due to the loss of expertise. In 2005, a member of Venezuela's energy ministries stated it would take more than 15 years for PDVSA to recover from Chávez's actions.

The 1999 constitution had introduced the concept of a recall referendum into Venezuelan politics, so the opposition called for such a referendum to take place. The resulting 2004 referendum to recall Chávez was unsuccessful. 70% of the eligible Venezuelan population turned out to vote, with 59% of voters deciding to keep the president in power. Commenting on his victory in the recall referendum, Chávez described the result as “an alternative to capitalism and false democracy.”

==== "Socialism of the 21st century" ====
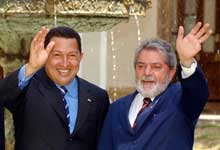
Hugo Chávez and Brazilian president Lula da Silva, 2005

In January 2005, Chávez began openly proclaiming the ideology of "socialism of the 21st century", something that was distinct from his earlier forms of Bolivarianism, which had been social democratic in nature, merging elements of capitalism and socialism. He used this new term to contrast the democratic socialism, which he wanted to promote in Latin America, from the Marxist–Leninist socialism that had been spread by socialist states like the Soviet Union and the People's Republic of China during the 20th century, arguing that the latter had not been truly democratic, suffering from a lack of participatory democracy and an excessively authoritarian governmental structure.

In May 2006, Chávez visited Europe in a private capacity, where he announced plans to supply cheap Venezuelan oil to poor working class communities in the continent. The Mayor of London Ken Livingstone welcomed him, describing him as "the best news out of Latin America in many years."

=== Third presidential term: 10 January 2007 – 10 January 2013 ===
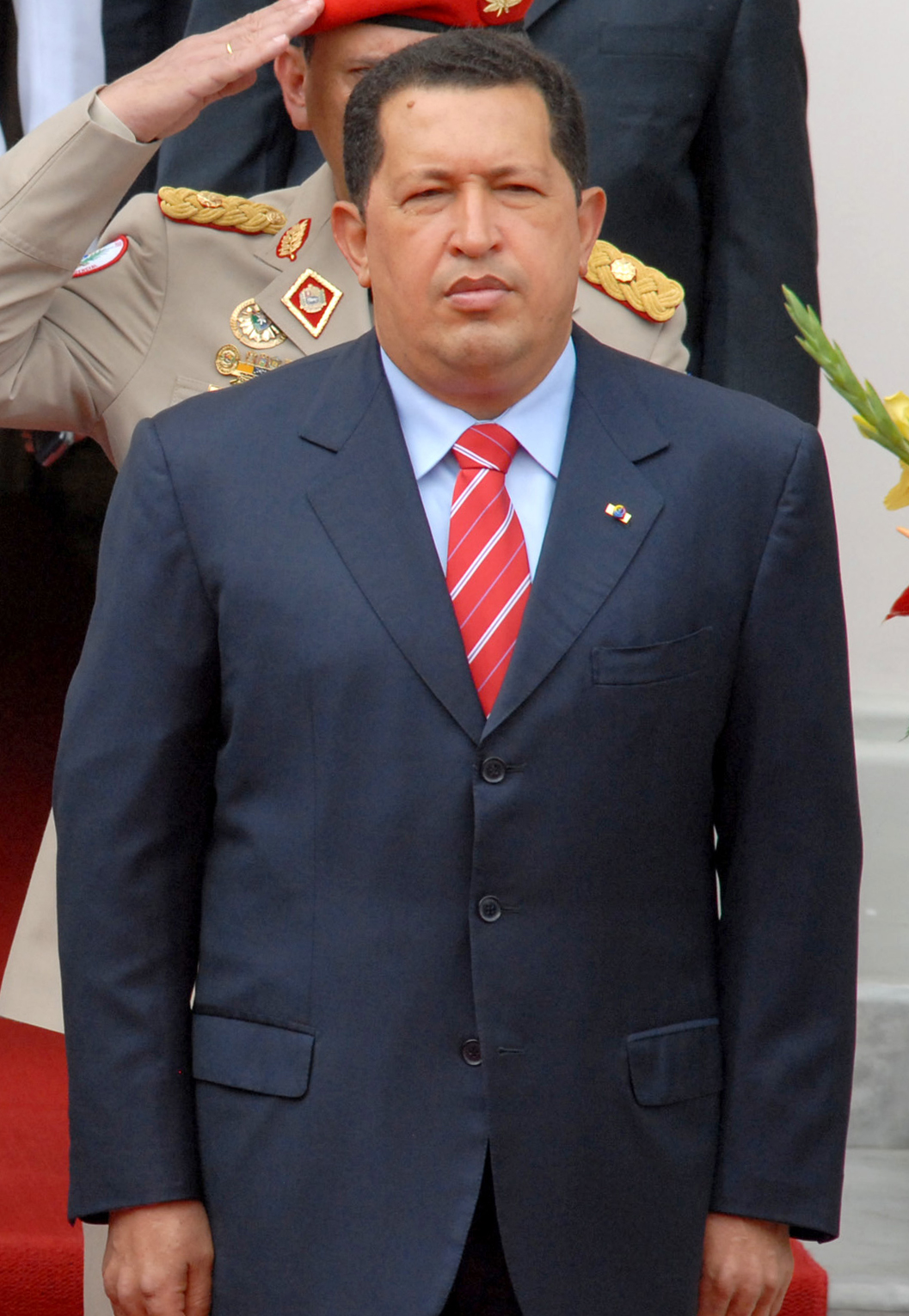
Chavez in Brazil, 2008

In the presidential election of December 2006, which saw a 77% voter turnout, Chávez was once more elected, this time with 63% of the vote, beating his closest challenger Manuel Rosales. The Organization of American States (OAS) and the Carter Center concluded that the election results were free and legitimate. After this victory, Chávez promised an "expansion of the revolution".

==== United Socialist Party of Venezuela and domestic policy ====
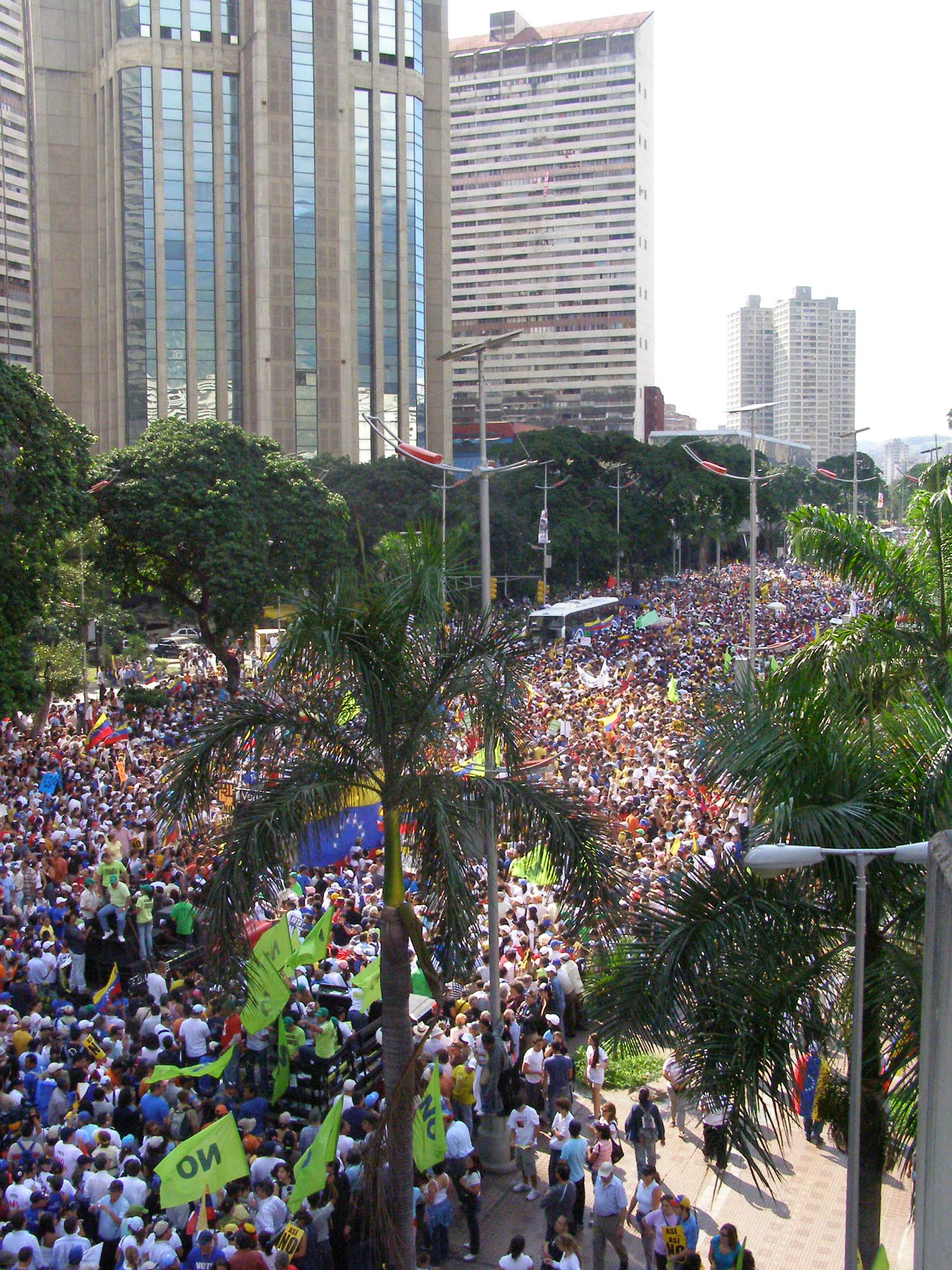
Hundreds of thousands of Venezuelans during the 2007 Venezuelan protests demonstrating against Chávez's proposed constitutional referendum

On 15 December 2006, Chávez publicly announced that those leftist political parties which had continually supported him in the Patriotic Pole would unite into one single, much larger party, the United Socialist Party of Venezuela (Partido Socialista Unido de Venezuela, PSUV). In the speech which he gave announcing the PSUV's creation, Chávez declared that the old parties must "forget their own structures, party colours and slogans, because they are not the most important thing for the fatherland".

The logo for the PSUV, Chávez's socialist political party founded in 2007 succeeding the Fifth Republic Movement

Chávez had initially proclaimed that those leftist parties which chose to not dissolve into the PSUV would have to leave the government. Party membership rose to 5.7 million people by 2007. The United Nations' International Labour Organization expressed concern over some voters' being pressured to join the party.

On 28 December 2006, President Chávez announced that the government would not renew RCTV's broadcast license which expired on 27 May 2007, thereby forcing the channel to cease operations on that day. On 17 May 2007, the government rejected a plea made by RCTV to stop the TV station's forced shutdown. Thousands of protesters marching both against and in support of the government's decision remained on the streets in Caracas. Other marches took place in Maracaibo and Valencia. On 21 May 2007, hundreds of journalists and students marched in Caracas carrying a banner reading "S.O.S. Freedom of Expression". A few days later, on 25 May 2007, university students from the Universidad Católica Andrés Bello, the Universidad Simón Bolívar and the Universidad Central de Venezuela protested against the government's intentions. On 26 May, tens of thousands of protesters marched in support of RCTV to their headquarters. Since the week prior to the shutdown of RCTV, many individuals, international organizations and NGOs—including the OAS's Secretary General José Miguel Insulza and its Special Rapporteur for Freedom of Expression, the Inter American Press Association, Human Rights Watch, and the Committee to Protect Journalists— expressed concerns for freedom of the press following the shutdown. However, Secretary Insulza also stated that it was up to the Venezuelan courts to solve this dispute and that he believed that this was an administrative decision.

In 2007, the Bolivarian government set up a constitutional commission to review the 1999 constitution and suggest potential amendments to be made to it. Led by the prominent pro-Chávez intellectual Luis Britto García, it suggested measures that would have increased many of the president's powers, for instance increasing the presidential term limit to seven years, allowing the president to run for election indefinitely and centralizing powers in the executive. The government put the suggested changes to a public referendum in December 2007. Abstention rate was high however, with 44% of registered voters not turning out, and in the end the proposed changes were rejected by 51% of votes. This would prove to the first electoral loss that Chávez had faced in the thirteen electoral contests held since he took power, due to the top-down nature of the changes, as well as general public dissatisfaction with "the absence of internal debate on its content, as well as dissatisfaction with the running of the social programmes, increasing street crime, and with corruption within the government".

To ensure that his Bolivarian Revolution became socially ingrained in Venezuela, Chávez discussed his wish to stand for re-election when his term ran out in 2013, and spoke of ruling beyond 2030. Under the 1999 constitution, he could not legally stand for re-election again, and so brought about a referendum on 15 February 2009 to abolish the two-term limit for all public offices, including the presidency. The referendum was approved with 54% in favor.

In mid-2010, tons of rotten food supplies imported during Chávez's government through subsidies of state-owned enterprise PDVAL were found. Due to the scandal, PDVAL started being administrated by the Vice President of Venezuela and afterwards by the Alimentation Ministry. Three former managers were detained, but were released afterwards and two of them had their positions restored. In July 2010, official estimates stated that 130,000 tons of food supplies were affected, while the political opposition informed of 170,000 tons. As of 2012, any advances in the investigations by the National Assembly were unknown. The most accepted explanation of the loss of food supplies is the organization of PDVAL, because the food network allegedly imported supplies faster than what it could distribute them. The opposition considers the affair as a corrupt case and spokespeople have assured that the public officials deliberately imported more food that could be distributed to embezzle funds through the import of subsidized supplies.

During an address on Chávez's birthday in 2011, he called on the middle classes and the private sector to get more involved in his Bolivarian Revolution, something he saw as "vital" to its success.

In August 2011, Chávez announced that his government would nationalize Venezuela's gold industry, taking it over from Russian-controlled company Rusoro, while at the same time also moving the country's gold stocks, which were largely stored in western banks, to banks in allied countries such as Russia, China and Brazil.

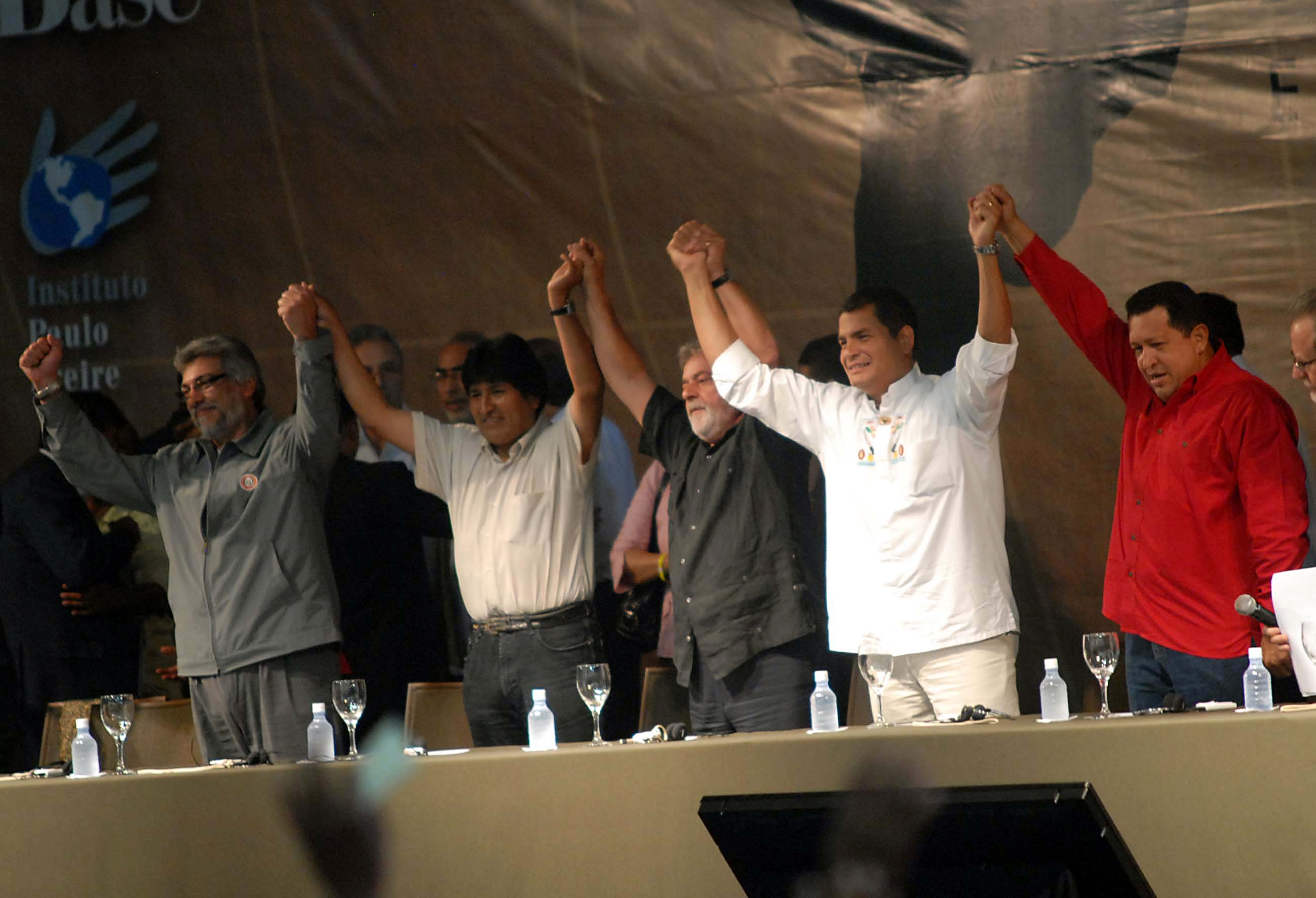
Chávez (far right) with fellow Latin American leftist presidents in 2009 (from left to right: Paraguay's Fernando Lugo, Bolivia's Evo Morales, Brazil's Lula da Silva and Ecuador's Rafael Correa)

=== Fourth presidential term: 10 January 2013 – 5 March 2013 ===
On 7 October 2012, Chávez won election as president for a fourth time, his third six-year term. He defeated Henrique Capriles with 54% of the votes versus 45% for Capriles, which was a lower victory margin than in his previous presidential wins, in the 2012 Venezuelan presidential election. Turnout in the election was 80%, with a hotly contested election between the two candidates. There was significant support for Chávez among the Venezuelan lower class. Chávez's opposition blamed him for unfairly using state funds to spread largesse before the election to bolster Chavez's support among his primary electoral base, the lower class.

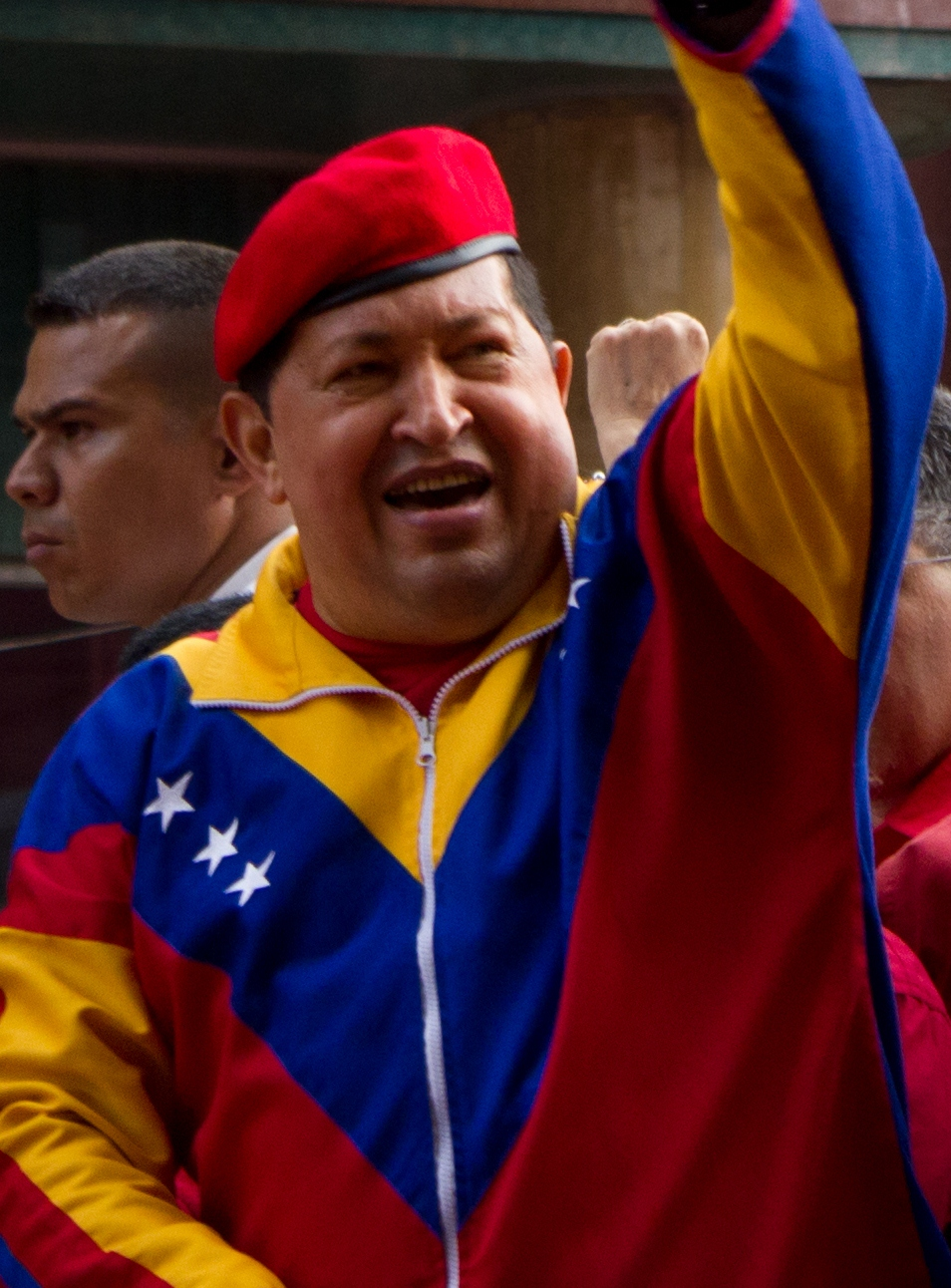
Chávez in June 2012

The inauguration of Chávez's fourth term was scheduled for 10 January 2013, but as he was undergoing medical treatment at the time in Cuba, he was not able to return to Venezuela for that date. The National Assembly president Diosdado Cabello proposed to postpone the inauguration and the Supreme Court decided that, being just another term of the sitting president and not the inauguration of a new one, the formality could be bypassed. The Venezuelan Bishops Conference opposed the verdict, stating that the constitution must be respected, and the Venezuelan government had not been transparent regarding details about Chávez's health.

Acting executive officials produced orders of government signed by Chávez, which were suspected of forgery by some opposition politicians, who claimed that Chávez was too sick to be in control of his faculties. Guillermo Cochez, recently dismissed from the office of Panamanian ambassador to the Organization of American States, even claimed that Chávez had been brain dead since 31 December 2012.

Due to the death of Chávez, Vice President Nicolás Maduro took over the presidential powers and duties for the remainder of Chávez's abbreviated term until presidential elections were held. Venezuela's constitution specifies that the speaker of the National Assembly, Diosdado Cabello, should assume the interim presidency if a president cannot be sworn in. Maduro remained in power as president until being deposed in 2026.

== Political ideology ==
Chávez was described as a leftist, with one journal stating that he was "billed as the hemisphere's second leftist leader after Cuba's Fidel Castro." In a 1996 interview, Chávez stated "I am not Marxist, but I am not anti-Marxist. I am not communist, but I am not anti-communist." In 1999, Chávez told the New York Times that "If you are attempting to determine whether Chavez is of the left, right, or center, if he is socialist, Communist, or capitalist, well, I am none of those, but I have a bit of all of those." In a 1998 interview, Chávez stated that "I am not a socialist. I believe that today's world, Latin America and the world to come require a leap forward. We are going beyond socialism and even savage capitalism."

=== Opposition to capitalism and neoliberalism ===
Democracy is impossible in a capitalist system. Capitalism is the realm of injustice and a tyranny of the richest against the poorest. Rousseau said, 'Between the powerful and the weak all freedom is oppressed. Only the rule of law sets you free.' That's why the only way to save the world is through socialism, a democratic socialism ... [Democracy is not just turning up to vote every four or five years], it's much more than that, it's a way of life, it's giving power to the people ... it is not the government of the rich over the people, which is what's happening in almost all the so-called democratic Western capitalist countries.

— Hugo Chávez, June 2010

Both before and during his presidency, Chávez spoke out against "savage capitalism", neoliberal capitalism and simply capitalism in various speeches. During his first electoral campaign, as noted by one observer, Chávez made clear his rejection of what he called "savage capitalism", using the words of Pope John Paul II. Chávez wanted greater state intervention in the economy, but "built bridges to the private sector to promote the development of national industry." According to Eduardo Semtei, a political scientist considered close to the ideas of Chavez, "From the beginning he had the idea that the classic capitalist model is a model contrary to the development of society."

In 1999, Chávez argued that a new constitution drafted by an assembly packed with his allies would distance Venezuela from "savage capitalism." He reiterated this position on 28 September 2001, when Chavez spoke negatively of neoliberal capitalism and the economic measures of the Carlos Andrés Pérez, El Gran Viraje, one of the causes of the Caracazo riots.

In various interviews conducted in 2002, Chávez shared his views on capitalism, saying that the Bolivarian Revolution was an alternative to neoliberalism, saying that capitalism was "sown ... in the marrow" of Venezuela and the rest of the world, stating that his revolution and its missions were more humane. Ultimately, Chávez said that the Bolivarian Revolution was "an alternative economy to dehumanized capitalism."

In 2003, Chávez argued that the Soviet Union disappeared when it failed in its efforts to dismantle "the devastating logic of capital", stating that it is the "alternative model" that he promoted was the one now confronting "neoliberalism and savage capitalism". While at the World Social Forum on 26 January 2003, Chávez criticized the idea that capitalism and neoliberalism "won" following the dissolution of the Soviet Union, saying that some individuals raised "the thesis of single thinking, there are no more alternatives, ... socialism is over, and communism is over and long live neoliberal capitalism and all this fairy tale."

Chávez noted in a 2005 interview that "At one time I came to think about the Third Way. I was having trouble interpreting the world. I was confused ... I spoke and wrote a lot about 'human capitalism'. Today I am convinced that it is impossible ... I became convinced that socialism is the way."

Chávez arguably did not fully talk openly about the socialism of the 21st century until 3 December 2006, during a speech after his reelection in the 2006 presidential elections.

=== Marxism and socialism ===
Chávez's connection to Marxism was a complex one, though he had described himself as a Marxist on some occasions. In May 1996, he gave an interview with Agustín Blanco Muñoz in which he remarked, "I am not a Marxist, but I am not anti-Marxist. I am not communist, but I am not anti-communist." In a 2009 speech to the national assembly, he said: "I am a Marxist to the same degree as the followers of the ideas of Jesus Christ and the liberator of America, Simón Bolívar". He was well versed in many Marxist texts, having read the works of many Marxist theoreticians, and often publicly quoted them. Various international Marxists supported his government, believing it to be a sign of proletariat revolution as predicted in Marxist theory. In 2010, Hugo Chávez proclaimed support for the ideas of Marxist Leon Trotsky, saying "When I called him (former Minister of Labour, José Ramón Rivero)" Chávez explained, "he said to me: 'President I want to tell you something before someone else tells you ... I am a Trotskyist', and I said, 'well, what is the problem? I am also a Trotskyist! I follow Trotsky's line, that of permanent revolution", and then cited Marx and Lenin.

Chávez also noted his identification with socialism, noting that "The Constitution speaks that the socioeconomic regime of Venezuela must have a strong cooperative and associative content and that gives it a charge that breaks with individualism and neoliberalism, which gives a strong socialist content to the project. In that direction we have to go all out. To cooperate is to socialize the economy, to give it a social content. I am sure that in Puerto Cruz, agricultural cooperatives will emerge." Later in his presidency Chávez promoted the socialism of the 21st century. His approach was more heavily influenced by the theories of István Mészáros, Michael Lebowitz and Marta Harnecker, who was Chávez's adviser between 2004 and 2011, rather than by those of Heinz Dieterich.

=== Bolivarianism ===
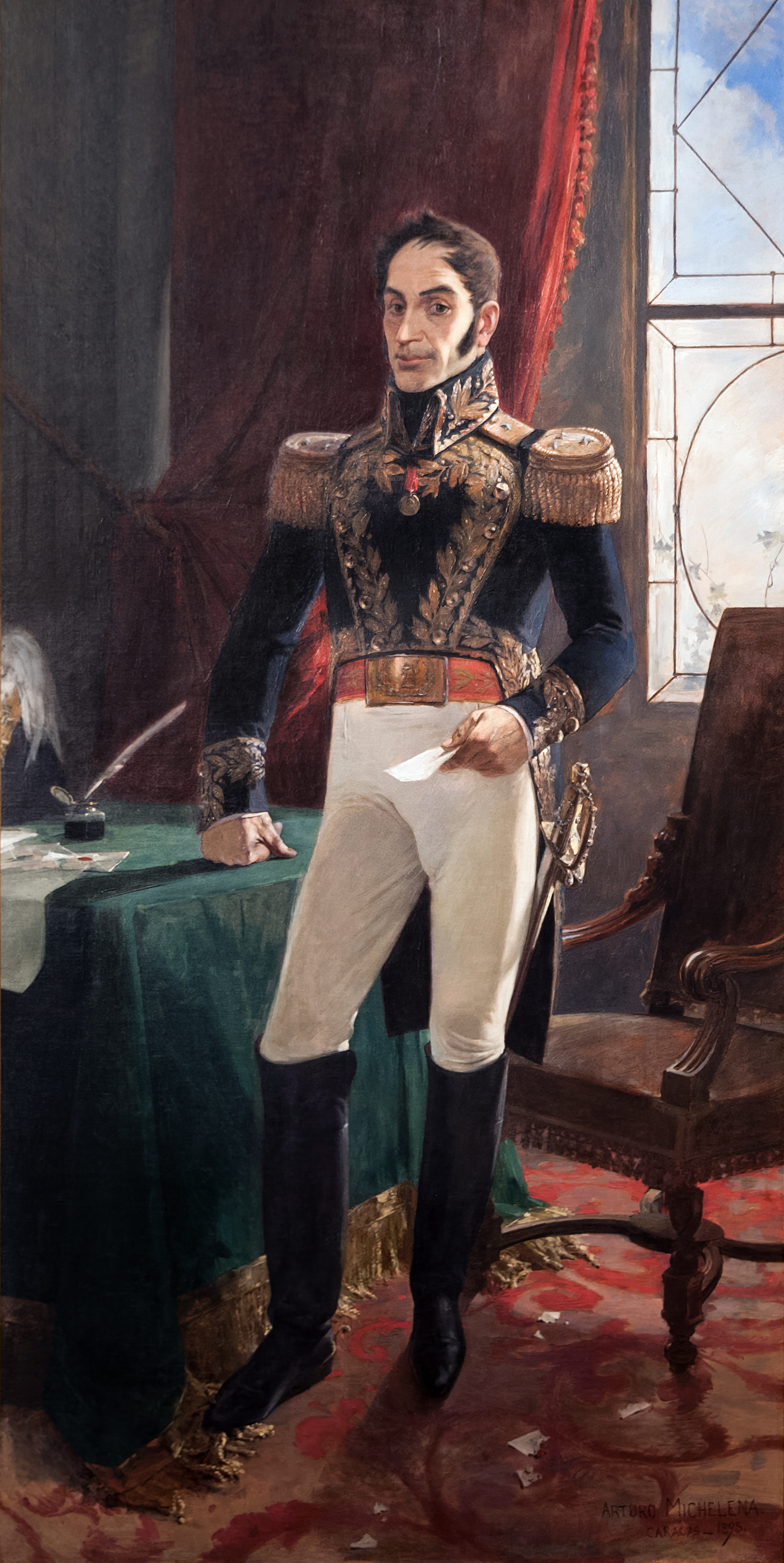
19th-century general and politician Simón Bolívar provided a basis for Chávez's political ideas.

Hugo Chávez defined his political position as Bolivarianism, an ideology he developed from that of Simón Bolívar (1783–1830) and others. Bolívar was a 19th-century general who led the fight against the colonialist Spanish authorities and who is widely revered across Latin America today. Along with Bolívar, the other two primary influences upon Bolivarianism are Simón Rodríguez (1769–1854), a philosopher who was Bolívar's tutor and mentor, and Ezequiel Zamora, (1817–1860), the Venezuelan Federalist general. The fact that Chávez's ideology originated from Bolívar has also received some criticism because Chávez had occasionally described himself as being influenced by Karl Marx, a critic of Bolívar. Beddow and Thibodeaux noted the complications between Bolívar and Marx, stating that "[d]escribing Bolivar as a socialist warrior in the class struggle, when he was actually member of the aristocratic 'criollos', is peculiar when considering Karl Marx's own writings on Bolivar, whom he dismissed as a false liberator who merely sought to preserve the power of the old Creole nobility which he belonged".

=== Other influences ===
Chávez's early heroes were nationalist military dictators that included former Peruvian president Juan Velasco Alvarado and former Panamanian "Maximum Leader" Omar Torrijos. One dictator Chávez admired was Marcos Pérez Jiménez, a former president of Venezuela that he praised for the public works he performed. Chávez praised Pérez Jiménez to vilify preceding democratic governments, stating that "General Pérez Jiménez was the best president Venezuela had in a long time ... He was much better than Rómulo Betancourt, much better than all of those others. They hated him because he was a soldier."

Chávez was also well acquainted with the various traditions of Latin American socialism, espoused by such figures as Colombian politician Jorge Eliécer Gaitán and former Chilean president Salvador Allende. Early in his presidency, Chávez was advised and influenced by the Argentine Peronist Norberto Ceresole. Communist revolutionaries Che Guevara and Fidel Castro also influenced Chávez and Castro's government assisted with the Bolivarian Missions. Chávez was also an admirer of Mao Zedong, whom he referred to as a ‘great strategist, great soldier, great statesman, and great revolutionary’ while visiting China October 1999. During his visit there, he also said that Venezuela was starting to ‘stand up’ like China did five decades earlier ‘under the leadership of its great helmsman (Mao),’ while also voicing his opposition to neoliberalism:

Soviet power has collapsed, but that does not mean that neo-liberal capitalism has to be the model followed by the peoples of the West. If only for that reason, we invite China to keep its flag flying, because this world cannot be run by a universal police force that seeks to control everything.

Chávez also spoke admiringly of Mahatma Gandhi, stating in a 2005 speech that "we must remember that thought of Gandhi that reflects a deep respect for himself, for his own country, for a healthy nationalism" and expressed support for what he said was Gandhi's espousal of being anti-capitalist, anti-colonialist and anti-imperialist. During the same speech, Chávez also expressed influence from Jawaharlal Nehru, noting he was a main figure of the Non-Aligned Movement, with Chávez citing his leadership as an inspiration "of the need, of brotherhood and solidarity among the peoples of the Third World. The need to unite to defend the interests of our people, of poor people against the abuse of rich people."

Other indirect influences on Chávez's political philosophy are the Gospel teachings of Jesus Christ. Other inspirations of Chávez's political view are Giuseppe Garibaldi, Antonio Gramsci and Antonio Negri.

==== Promotion of conspiracy theories ====
In September 2006, Chávez said 9/11 conspiracy theories were "not absurd" and that "a building never collapses like that, unless it's with an implosion". Chávez also told Christopher Hitchens that he did not believe that the footage of the Apollo 11 Moon landings was genuine.

== Policy overview ==
=== Economic and social policy ===
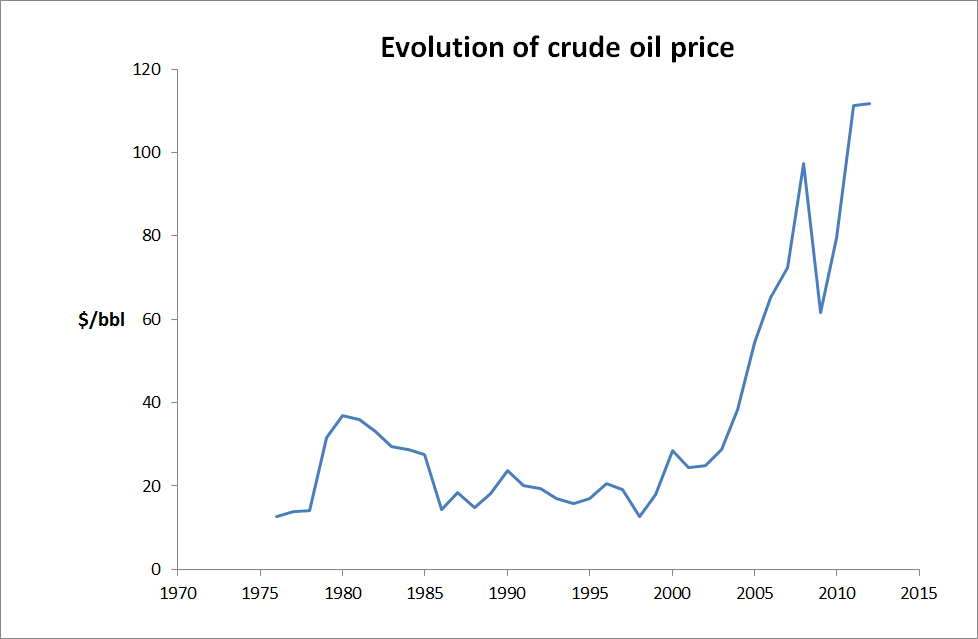
Historical crude oil prices, including the period of the Chávez administration (1998–2013)

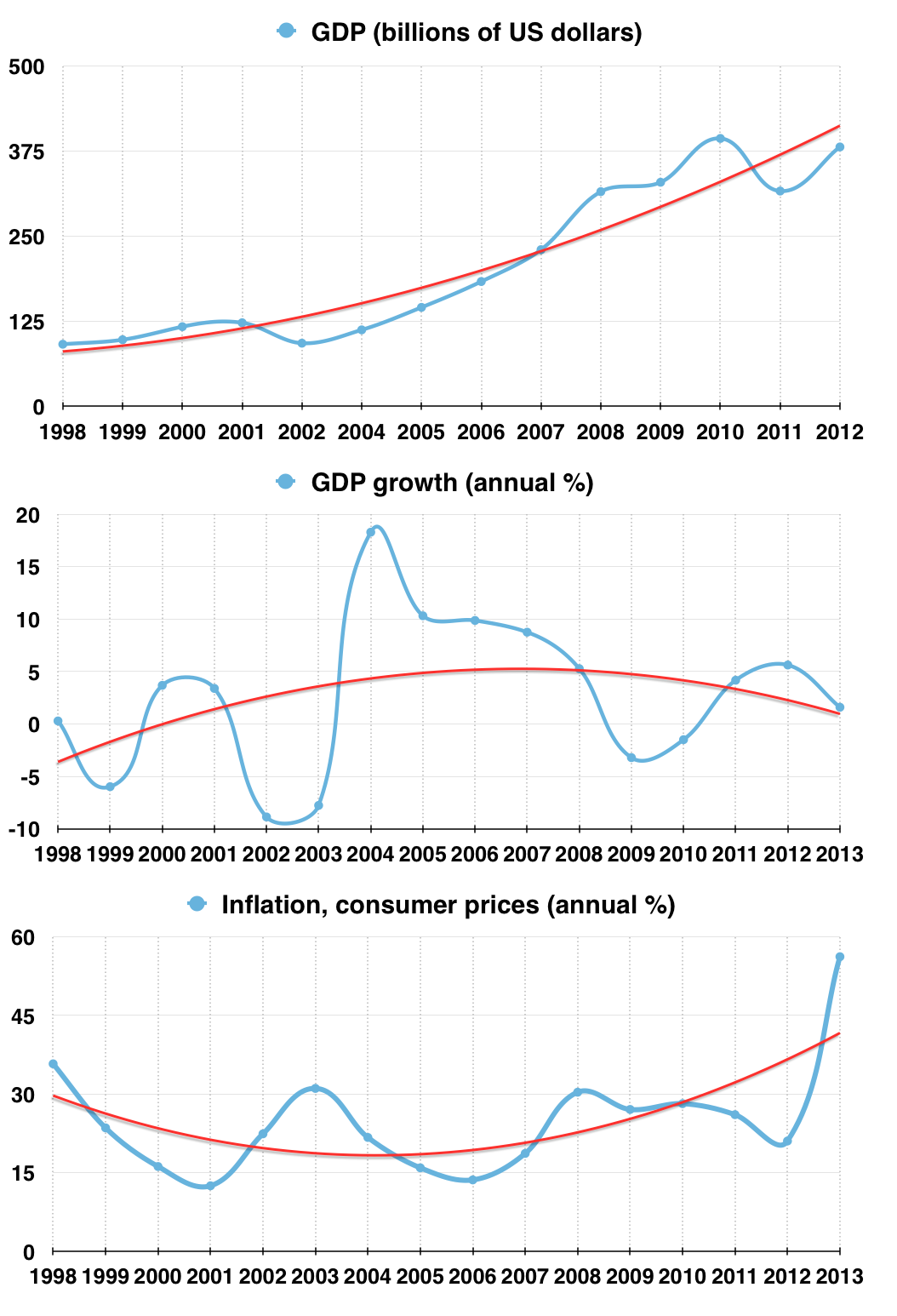
The blue line represents annual rates The red line represents trends of annual rates given throughout the period shown GDP is in billions of Local Currency Unit that has been adjusted for inflation Sources: International Monetary Fund, World Bank

From his election in 1998 until his death in March 2013, Chávez's administration proposed and enacted populist economic policies. The social programs were designed to be short-term, though after seeing political success as their result, Chávez made the efforts central to his administration and often overspent outside of Venezuela's budget.

Due to increasing oil prices in the early 2000s which raised funds not seen in Venezuela since the 1980s, Chávez created the Bolivarian Missions, aimed at providing public services to improve economic, cultural, and social conditions, using these populist policies to maintain political power. According to Corrales and Penfold, "aid was disbursed to some of the poor, and more gravely, in a way that ended up helping the president and his allies and cronies more than anyone else". The Missions, which were directly overseen by Chávez and often linked to his political campaigns, entailed the construction of thousands of free medical clinics for the poor and the enactment of food and housing subsidies. The quality of life of Venezuelans had also improved temporarily according to a UN Index. Teresa A. Meade wrote that Chávez's popularity strongly depended "on the lower classes who have benefited from these health initiatives and similar policies". Following elections, social programs saw less attention from the government and their overall effectiveness decreased.

The Gini coefficient, a measure of income inequality, dropped from .495 in 1998 to .39 in 2011, putting Venezuela behind only Canada in the Western Hemisphere. 95% of Venezuelans aged 15 and older could also read and write, though some scholars have disputed the claim that literacy improvements during Chavez's presidency resulted from his administration's policies. The poverty rate fell from 48.6% in 1999 to 32.1% in 2013, according to the Venezuelan government's National Statistics Institute (INE). The drop of Venezuela's poverty rate compared to poverty in other South American countries was slightly behind that of Peru, Brazil and Panama with the poverty rate becoming higher than the Latin American average in 2013 according to the UN. In the two years following Chávez's death, the poverty rate returned to where it had been before his presidency, with a 2017 NACLA analysis stating that "reductions in poverty and inequality during the Chávez years were real, but somewhat superficial ... structural poverty and inequality, such as the quality of housing, neighborhoods, education, and employment, remained largely unchanged".

Chávez's populist policies eventually led to a severe socioeconomic crisis in Venezuela. The social works initiated by Chávez's government relied on oil products, the keystone of the Venezuelan economy, with Chávez's administration suffering from Dutch disease as a result. In 2012, the World Bank also explained that Venezuela's economy was "extremely vulnerable" to changes in oil prices since in 2012 "96% of the country's exports and nearly half of its fiscal revenue" relied on oil production, while by 2008, according to Foreign Policy, exports of everything but oil "collapsed". The Chávez administration then spent governmental proceeds from the high oil prices on his populist policies to gain the approval of voters.

Economists say that the Venezuelan government's overspending on social programs and strict business policies caused to imbalances in the country's economy, contributing to rising inflation, poverty, low healthcare spending and shortages in Venezuela going into the final years of his presidency. Such occurrences, especially the risk of default and the unfriendliness toward private businesses, led to a lack of foreign investment and stronger foreign currencies, though the Venezuelan government argued that the private sector had remained relatively unchanged during Chavez's presidency despite several nationalizations. In January 2013 near the end of Chávez's presidency, The Heritage Foundation and The Wall Street Journal gave Venezuela's economic freedom a score of 36.1, down from 56.1 in 1999, ranking its freedom very low at 174th of 177 countries, with freedom on a downward trend. According to some analysts, the economic problems Venezuela has suffered under President Nicolás Maduro would likely have emerged even if Chávez had remained president.

==== Food and products ====
In the 1980s and 1990s, health and nutrition indexes in Venezuela were generally low, and social inequality in access to nutrition was high. Chávez made it his stated goal to lower inequality in access to basic nutrition, and to achieve food sovereignty for Venezuela. The main strategy for making food available to all economic classes was the controversial policy of creating fixed price ceilings for basic staple foods, which was implemented in 2003. Between 1998 and 2006, malnutrition related deaths fell by 50%. Chávez also expropriated and redistributed 5 million acres of farmland from large landowners.

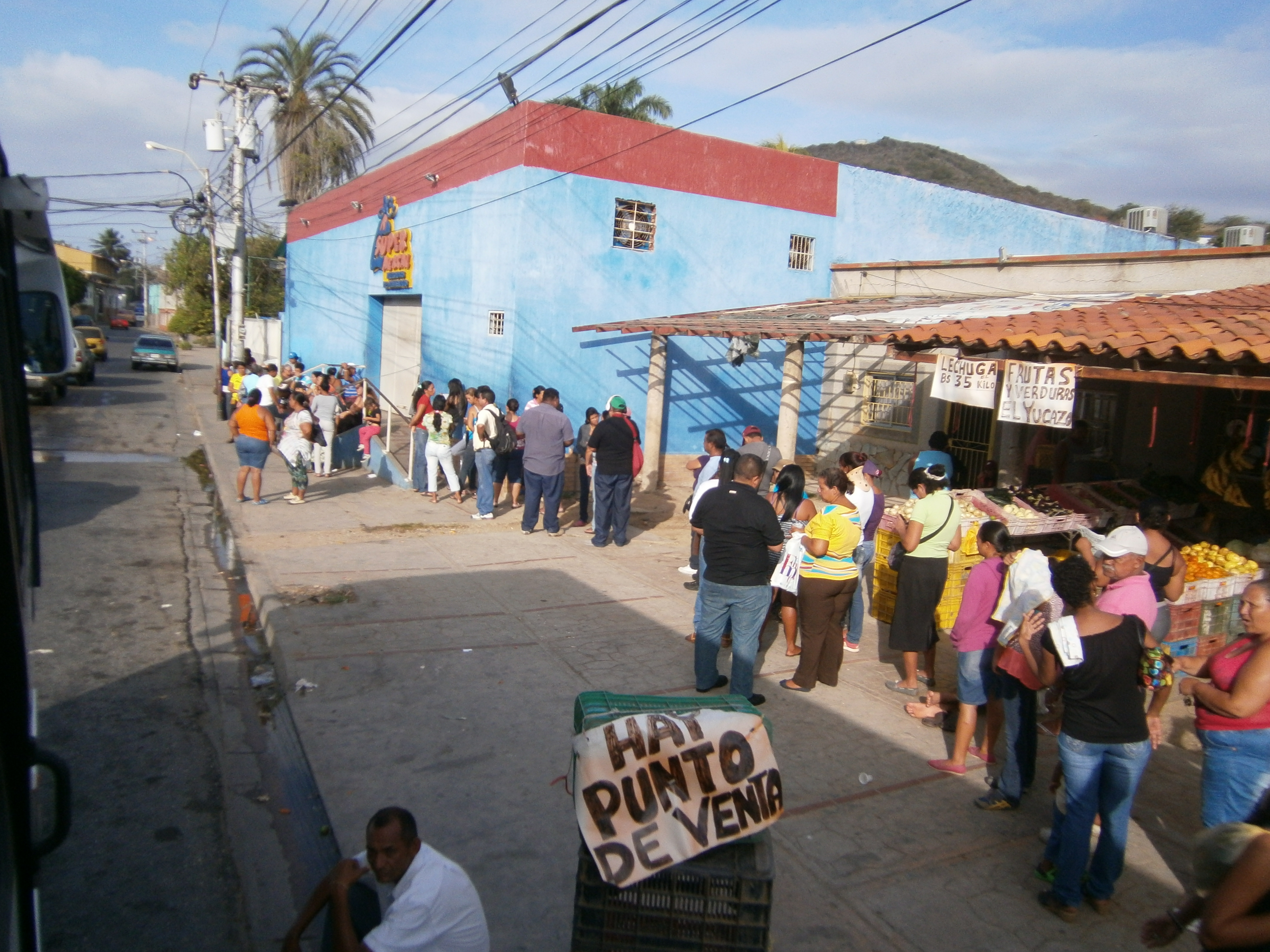
Shoppers waiting in line at a government-run MERCAL store

Price controls initiated by Chávez created product shortages since merchants could no longer afford to import necessary goods. Chávez blamed "speculators and hoarders" for these scarcities and strictly enforced his price control policy, denouncing anyone who sold food products for higher prices. In 2011, food prices in Caracas were nine times higher than when the price controls were put in place and resulted in shortages of cooking oil, chicken, powdered milk, cheese, sugar and meat. The price controls increased the demand for basic foods while making it difficult for Venezuela to import goods, causing increased reliance on domestic production. Economists believe this policy increased shortages. Shortages of food then occurred throughout the rest of Chávez's presidency with food shortage rates between 10% and 20% from 2010 to 2013. One possible reason for shortages is the relationship between inflation and subsidies, where a lack profitability due to price regulations affects operations. In turn, the lack of dollars made it difficult to purchase more food imports. Chávez's strategy in response to food shortages consisted of attempting to increase domestic production through nationalizing large parts of the food industry, though such nationalizations allegedly did the opposite and caused decreased production instead.

As part of his strategy of food security Chávez started a national chain of supermarkets, the Mercal network, which had 16,600 outlets and 85,000 employees that distributed food at highly discounted prices, and ran 6,000 soup kitchens throughout the country. Simultaneously Chávez expropriated many private supermarkets. The Mercal network was criticized by some commentators as being a part of Chávez's strategy to brand himself as a provider of cheap food, and the shops feature his picture prominently. The Mercal network was also subject to frequent shortages of basic staples such as meat, milk and sugar—and when scarce products arrived, shoppers had to wait in lines.

==== Communes ====
After his election in 1998, more than 100,000 state-owned cooperatives—which claimed to represent some 1.5 million people—were formed with the assistance of government start-up credit and technical training.

The Venezuelan government often failed to construct the number of homes they had proposed. According to Venezuela's El Universal, one of the Chávez administration's outstanding failures was the inability to meet its goals of constructing housing.

==== Currency controls ====
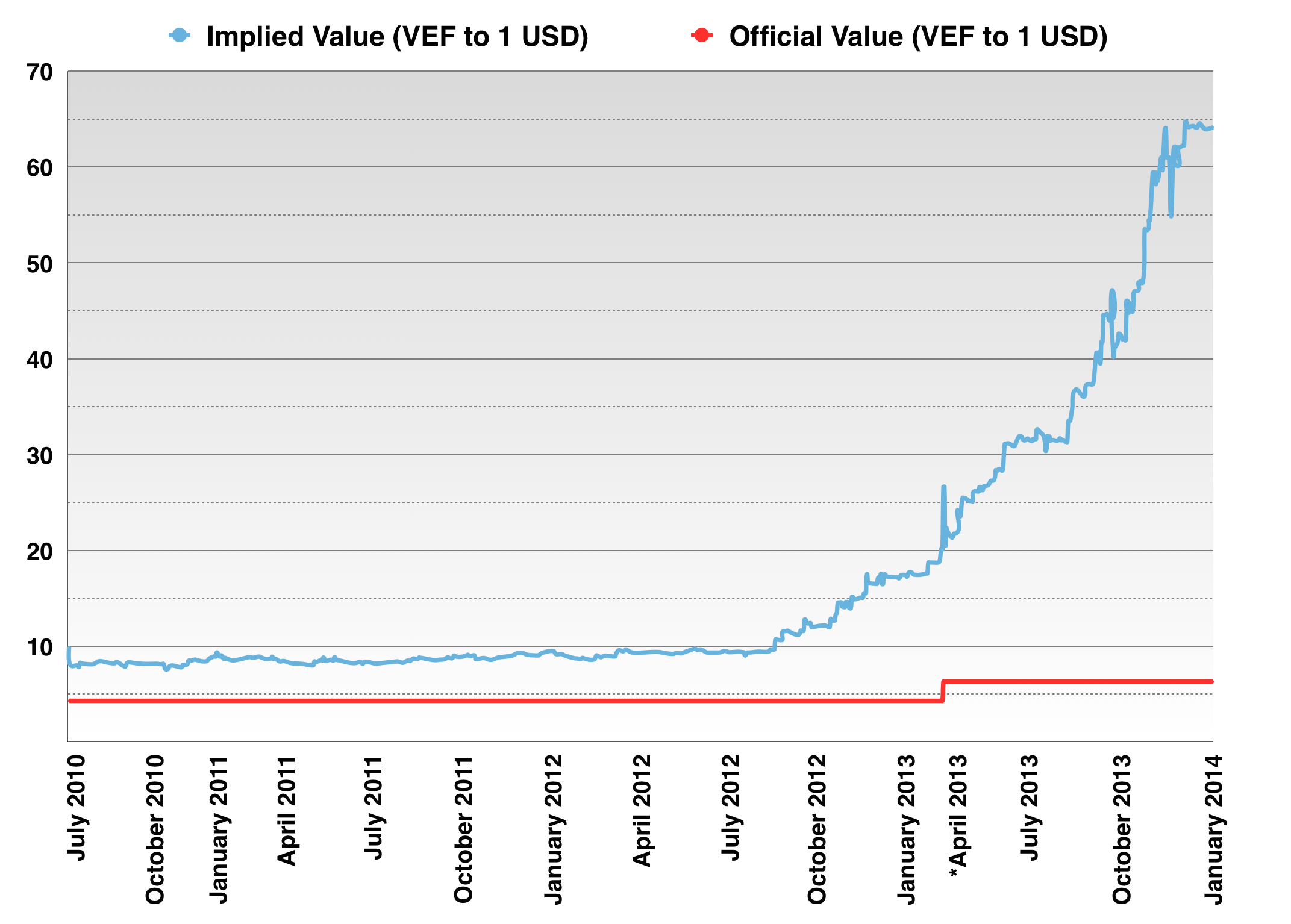
Blue line represents implied value of the hard bolívar (VEF) compared to the US dollar (USD). The red line represents what the Venezuelan government officially rates the hard bolívar. Sources: Banco Central de Venezuela, Dolar Paralelo, Federal Reserve Bank, International Monetary Fund

In the first few years of Chavez's office, his newly created social programs required large payments to make the desired changes. On 5 February 2003, the government created CADIVI, a currency control board charged with handling foreign exchange procedures. Its creation was to control capital flight by placing limits on individuals and only offering them so much of a foreign currency. This limit to foreign currency led to a creation of a currency black market economy since Venezuelan merchants rely on foreign goods that require payments with reliable foreign currencies. As Venezuela printed more money for their social programs, the bolívar continued to devalue for Venezuelan citizens and merchants since the government held the majority of the more reliable currencies.

The implied value or "black market value" is what Venezuelans believe the hard bolívar is worth compared to the United States dollar. The high rates in the black market make it difficult for businesses to purchase necessary goods since the government often forces these businesses to make price cuts. This leads to businesses selling their goods and making a low profit. Since businesses make low profits, this leads to shortages since they are unable to import the goods that Venezuela is reliant on. Chavez used exchange rate subsidies to underwrite imports; this policy was not welfare-maximizing, but rather benefited special interests.

=== Crime and punishment ===
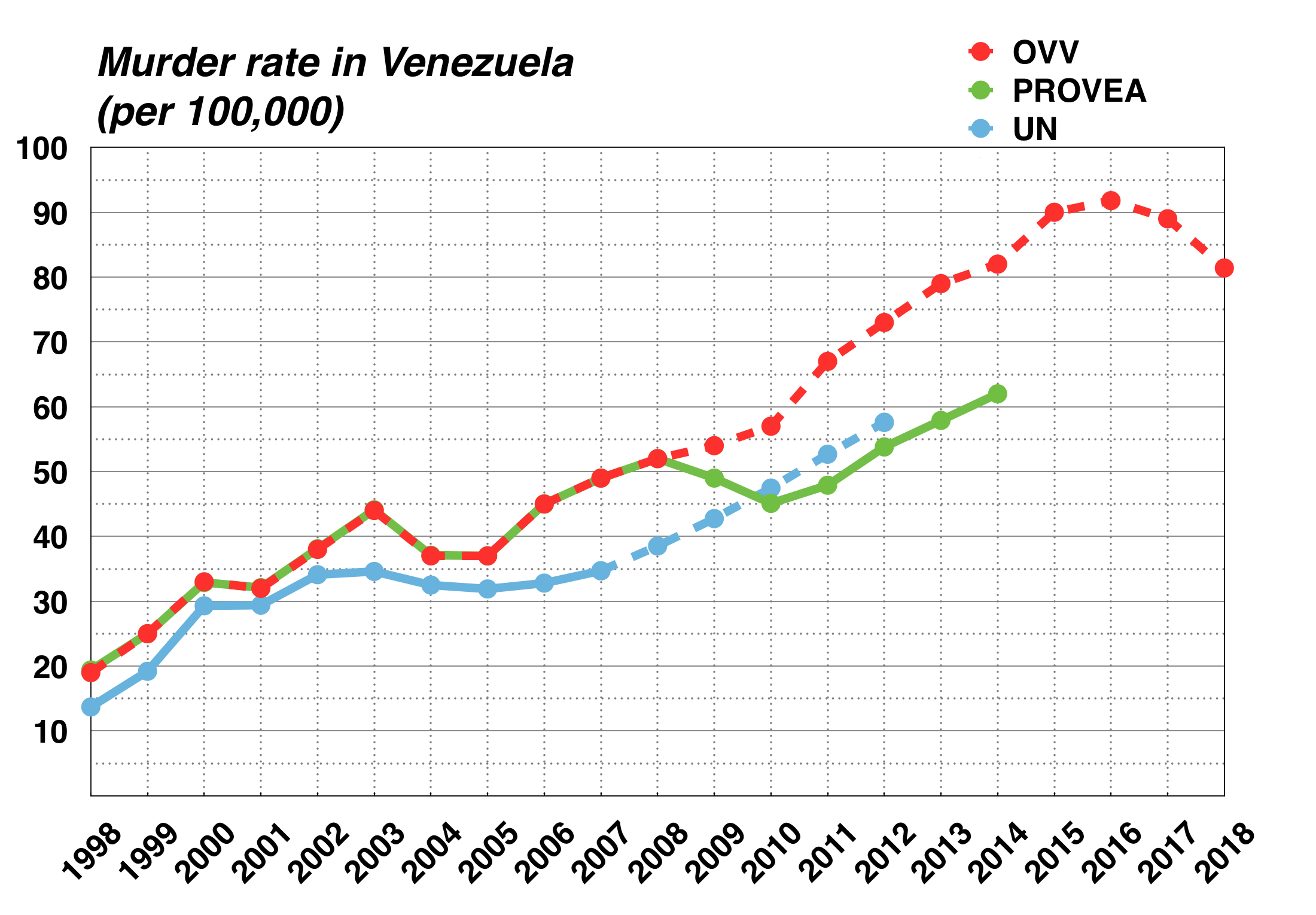
Murder rate (1 murder per 100,000 citizens) from 1998 to 2018 Sources: OVV, PROVEA, UN * UN line between 2007 and 2012 is simulated because of missing data.

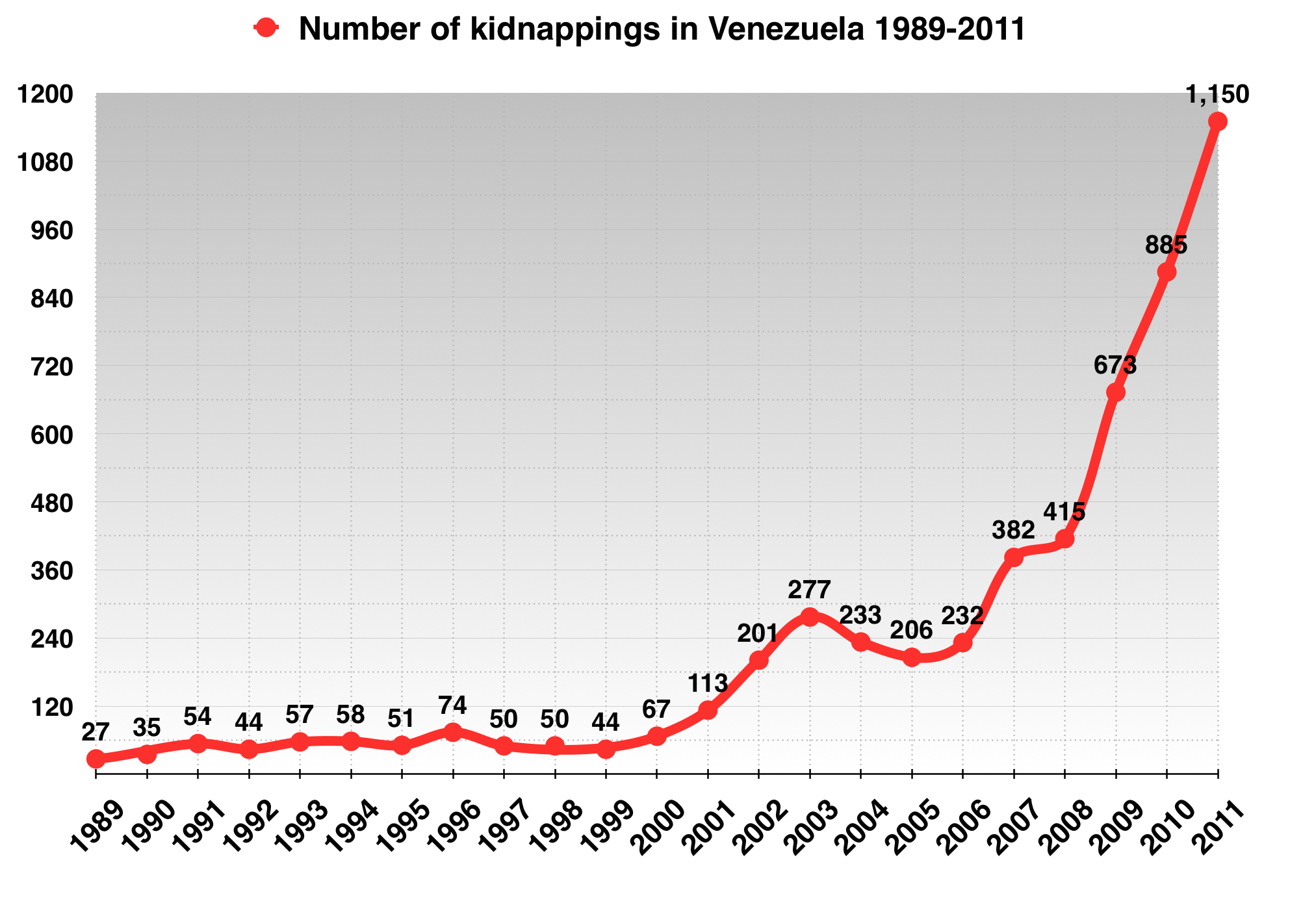
Number of kidnappings in Venezuela 1989–2011 Source: CICPC * Express kidnappings may not be included in data.

During the 1980s and 1990s there was a steady increase in crime in Latin America. The countries of Colombia, El Salvador, Venezuela, and Brazil all had homicide rates above the regional average. During Chávez's terms as president, hundreds of thousands of Venezuelans were murdered due to violent crimes occurring in the country. Gareth A. Jones and Dennis Rodgers stated in their book Youth violence in Latin America: Gangs and Juvenile Justice in Perspective that, "With the change of political regime in 1999 and the initiation of the Bolivarian Revolution, a period of transformation and political conflict began, marked by a further increase in the number and rate of violent deaths" showing that in four years, the murder rate had increased to 44 per 100,000 people. Kidnappings also rose tremendously during Chávez's tenure, with the number of kidnappings over 20 times higher in 2011 than when Chavez was elected. Documentary filmmaker James Brabazon stated "kidnapping crimes had skyrocketed ... after late Venezuelan President Hugo Chavez freed thousands of violent prisoners as part of controversial criminal justice system reforms" while kidnappings and murders also increased due to Colombian organized crime activity as well. He further explained that common criminals felt that the Venezuelan government did not care for the problems of the higher and middle classes, which in turn gave them a sense of impunity that created a large business of kidnapping-for-ransom.

Under Chávez's administration, crimes were so prevalent that by 2007 the government no longer produced crime data. Homicide rates in Venezuela more than tripled, with one NGO finding the rate to have nearly quadrupled. The majority of the deaths occur in crowded slums in Caracas. The NGO found that the number of homicides in the country increased from 6,000 in 1999 to 24,763 in 2013. In 2010 Caracas had the highest murder rate in the world, having more deaths than Baghdad during the Iraq War. According to the United Nations Office on Drugs and Crime, in 2012 there were 13,080 murders in Venezuela.

In leaked government INE data for kidnappings in the year 2009, the number of kidnappings were at an estimated 16,917, contrasting the CICPCs number of only 673, before the Venezuelan government blocked the data. According to the leaked INE report, only 1,332 investigations for kidnappings were opened or about 7% of the total kidnapping cases, with 90% of the kidnappings happening away from rural areas, 80% of all being express kidnappings and the most common victim being lower-middle or middle class Venezuelans and middle-aged men. Also in 2009, it was reported that Venezuelan authorities would assign judicial police to Caracas area morgues to speak with families. At that time, they would advise families not to report the murder of their family member to the media in exchange for expediting the process of releasing the victim's body.

In September 2010, responding to escalating crime rates in the country, Chávez stated that Venezuela was no more violent than it was when he first took office. An International Crisis Group report that same year stated that when Chávez took office, there were some factors beyond his control that led to the crime epidemic throughout Venezuela, but that Chávez ignored it as well as corruption in the country; especially among fellow state officials. The report also stated that international organised crime filters between Colombia and Venezuela with assistance from "the highest spheres of government" in Venezuela, leading to higher rates of kidnapping, drug trafficking, and homicides. Chávez supporters stated that the Bolivarian National Police had reduced crime and also said that the states with the highest murder rates were controlled by the opposition.

==== Prisons ====
During Chávez's presidency, there were reports of prisoners having easy access to firearms, drugs, and alcohol. Carlos Nieto, head of Window to Freedom, alleged that heads of gangs acquire military weapons from the state, saying: "They have the types of weapons that can only be obtained by the country's armed forces. ... No one else has these." Use of internet and mobile phones were also commonplace, allowing criminals to take part in street crime while in prison. One prisoner explained how, "if the guards mess with us, we shoot them" and that he had "seen a man have his head cut off and people play football with it".

Edgardo Lander, a sociologist and professor at the Central University of Venezuela with a PhD in sociology from Harvard University, explained that Venezuelan prisons were "practically a school for criminals" since young inmates come out "trained and hardened" compared to before their incarceration. He also explained that prisons are controlled by gangs and that "very little has been done" to restrain their activities.

=== Elections under Chávez ===
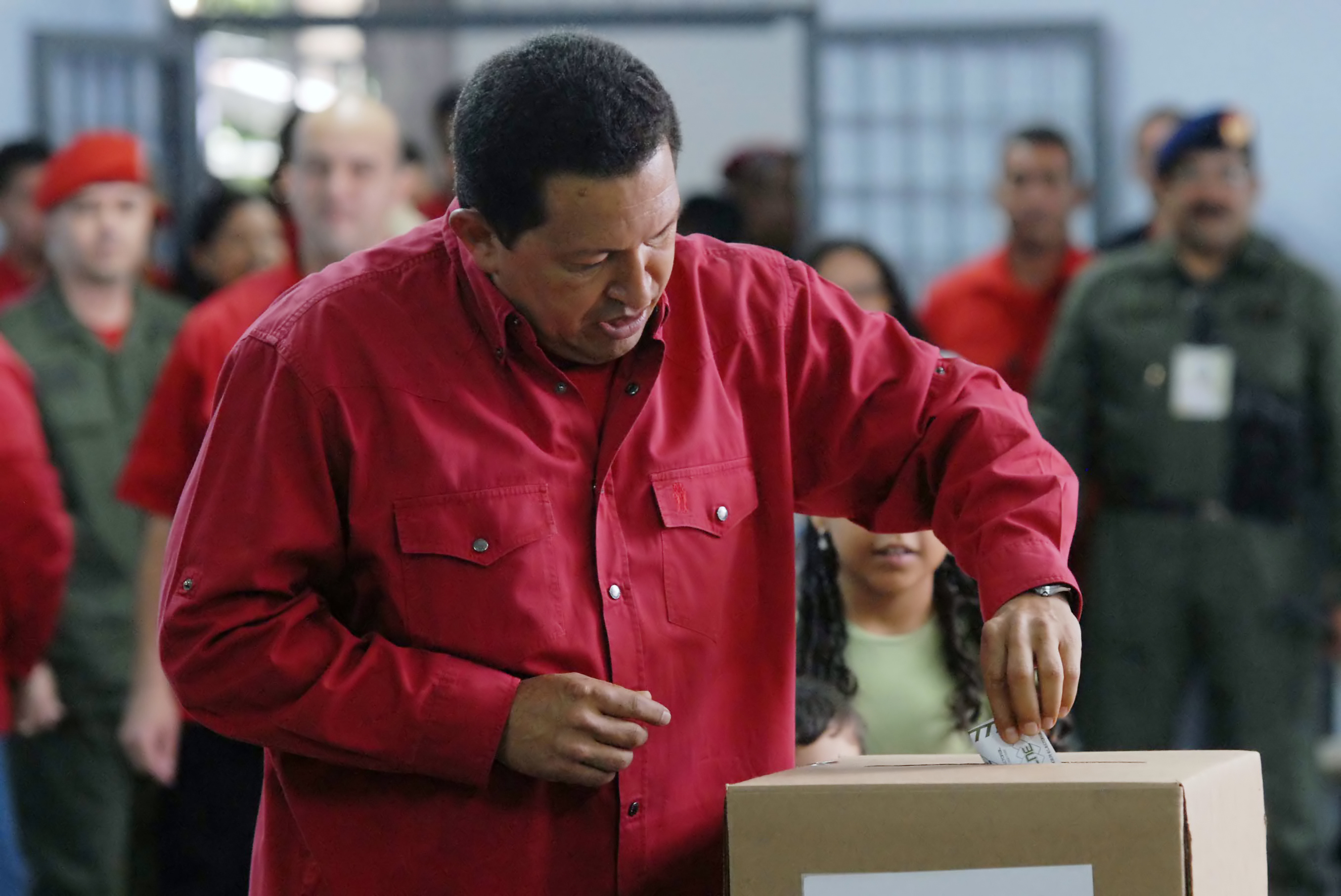
Chávez voting in December 2007

The electoral processes surrounding Venezuela's democracy under Chávez were often observed controversially. According to Bloomberg, he changed Venezuela from a democracy to "a largely authoritarian system".

However, there were limits to his authoritarianism, and he thought of the electoral system as a key way to make himself more effective as a leader.

As New York University historian Greg Grandin has pointed out, Chávez "submitted himself and his agenda to 14 national votes, winning 13 of them by large margins, in polling deemed by Jimmy Carter to be ‘best in the world.’"

Francisco Toro, editor of Caracas Chronicles, an opposition-friendly news and analysis site, said "Chávez was always careful to maintain electoral legitimacy". Toro says that Chávez had big advantages with friendly media and his tendency to use state money on his campaigns, but that he didn't "steal or cancel elections blatantly." Chávez even allowed his opposition to run a recall referendum against him in 2004 just two years after surviving a coup attempt. He won the referendum by a huge margin.

Since 1998, elections in Venezuela have been automated using touch-screen DRE voting machines, which provide a Voter Verified Paper Audit Trail and administered by the National Electoral Council.

In Venezuela, voters touch a computer screen to cast their vote and then receive a paper receipt, which they verify and deposit in a ballot box. Most of the paper ballots are compared with the electronic tally. This system makes vote-rigging nearly impossible: to steal the vote would require hacking the computers and then stuffing the ballot boxes to match the rigged vote.

Beginning in 2012, Venezuela's elections used biometric authentication to activate the voting machine.

=== Corruption ===
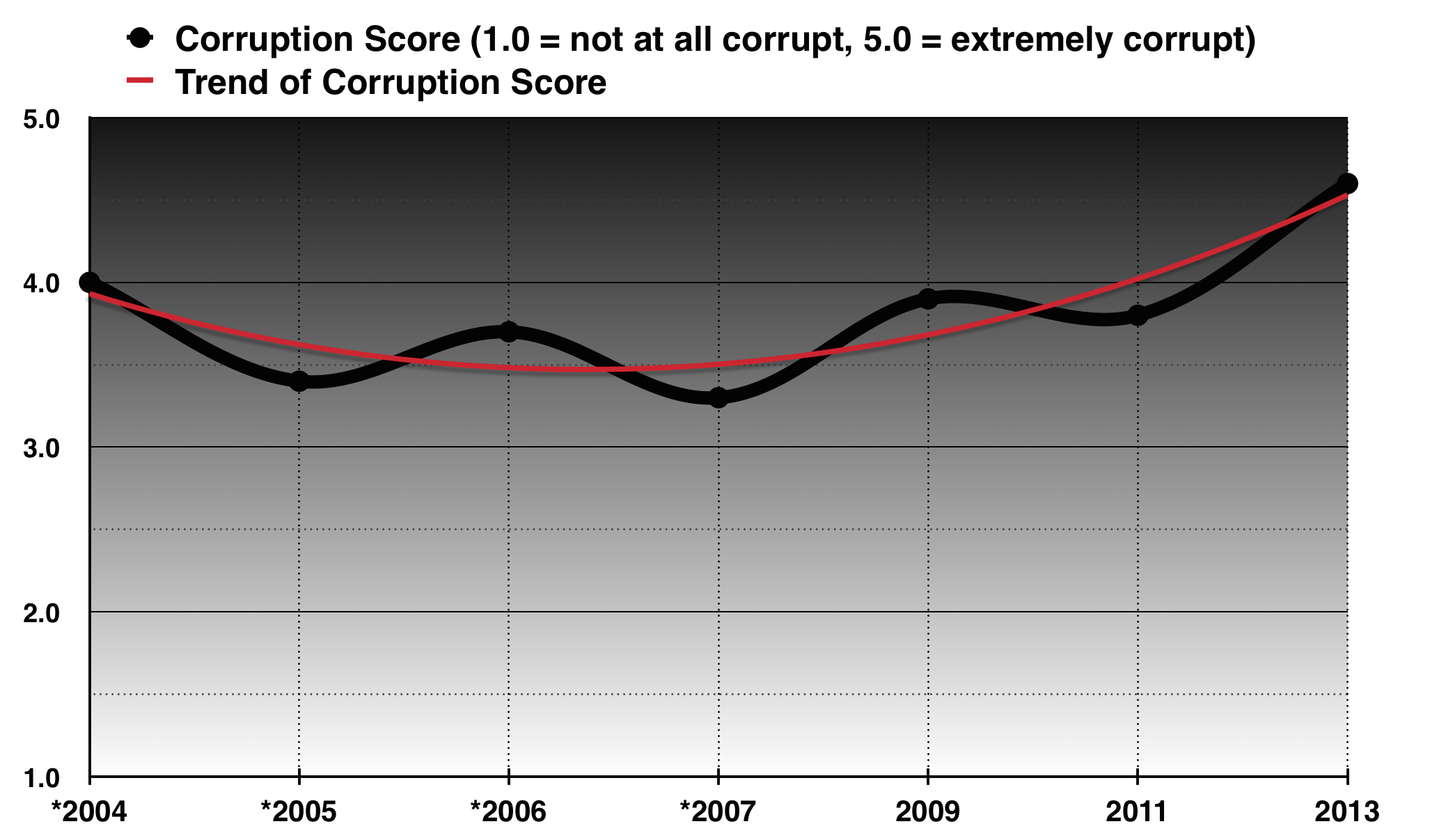
Venezuela's perception of corruption scores between 2004 and 2013 ( * ) Score was averaged according to Transparency International's method. Source: Transparency International

In December 1998, Hugo Chávez declared three goals for the new government; "convening a constituent assembly to write a new constitution, eliminating government corruption, and fighting against social exclusion and poverty". However, according to the libertarian Cato Institute, during Hugo Chávez's time in power, corruption has become widespread throughout the government due to impunity towards members of the government, bribes and the lack of transparency. In 2004, Hugo Chávez and his allies took over the Supreme Court, filling it with supporters of Chávez and made new measures so the government could dismiss justices from the court. According to the Cato Institute, the National Electoral Council of Venezuela was under control of Chávez where he tried to "push a constitutional reform that would have allowed him unlimited opportunities for reelection". The Corruption Perceptions Index, produced annually by the Berlin-based NGO Transparency International (TNI), reported that in the later years of Chávez's tenure, corruption worsened; it was 158th out of 180 countries in 2008, and 165th out of 176 (tied with Burundi, Chad, and Haiti). Most Venezuelans believed the government's effort against corruption was ineffective; that corruption had increased; and that government institutions such as the judicial system, parliament, legislature, and police were the most corrupt.

In Gallup Poll's 2006 Corruption Index, Venezuela ranked 31st out of 101 countries according to how widespread the population perceive corruption as being in the government and in business. The index listed Venezuela as the second least corrupt nation in Latin America, behind Chile. Some criticism came from Chávez's supporters, as well. Chávez's own political party, Fifth Republic Movement (MVR), had been criticized as being riddled with the same cronyism, political patronage, and corruption that Chávez alleged were characteristic of the old "Fourth Republic" political parties. Venezuela's trade unionists and indigenous communities participated in peaceful demonstrations intended to impel the government to facilitate labor and land reforms. These communities, while largely expressing their sympathy and support for Chávez, criticized what they saw as Chávez's slow progress in protecting their interests against managers and mining concerns, respectively.

==== Aiding FARC ====
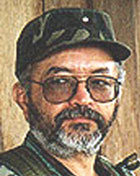
Raúl Reyes

According to the International Institute for Strategic Studies (IISS), "Chavez's government funded FARC's office in Caracas and gave it access to Venezuela's intelligence services" and said that during the 2002 coup attempt that "FARC also responded to requests from [Venezuela's intelligence service] to provide training in urban terrorism involving targeted killings and the use of explosives". The IISS continued saying that "the archive offers tantalizing but ultimately unproven suggestions that FARC may have undertaken assassinations of Chavez's political opponents on behalf of the Venezuelan state". Venezuelan diplomats denounced the IISS' findings saying that they had "basic inaccuracies".

In 2007, authorities in Colombia declared that through laptops they had seized on a raid against Raúl Reyes, they found in documents that Hugo Chávez offered payments of as much as $300 million to the FARC "among other financial and political ties that date back years" along with other documents showing "high-level meetings have been held between rebels and Ecuadorean officials" and some documents arguing that FARC had "bought and sold uranium".

In 2015, Chávez's former bodyguard Leamsy Salazar stated in the book Bumerán Chávez that Chávez met with the high command of FARC in 2007 somewhere in rural Venezuela. Chávez created a system in which the FARC would provide the Venezuelan government with drugs that would be transported in live cattle and the FARC would receive money and weaponry from the Venezuelan government. According to Salazar, this was done to weaken Colombian President Álvaro Uribe, an enemy of Chávez.

In 2019, federal prosecutors from the Southern District of New York further provided documents outlining that in 2005 Chávez ordered top lieutenants to discuss plans to ship cocaine to the United States with the help of the FARC and "flood" the country with the drug, as part of his policy objectives to combat the United States.

=== Human rights ===
Human rights in Venezuela has been an ongoing issue and has been criticized by human rights organizations such as Human Rights Watch and Amnesty International. Concerns include poor prison conditions, torture, attacks against journalists, political persecution, extrajudicial executions by death squads, forced disappearance and harassment of human rights defenders.

==== Criticisms ====
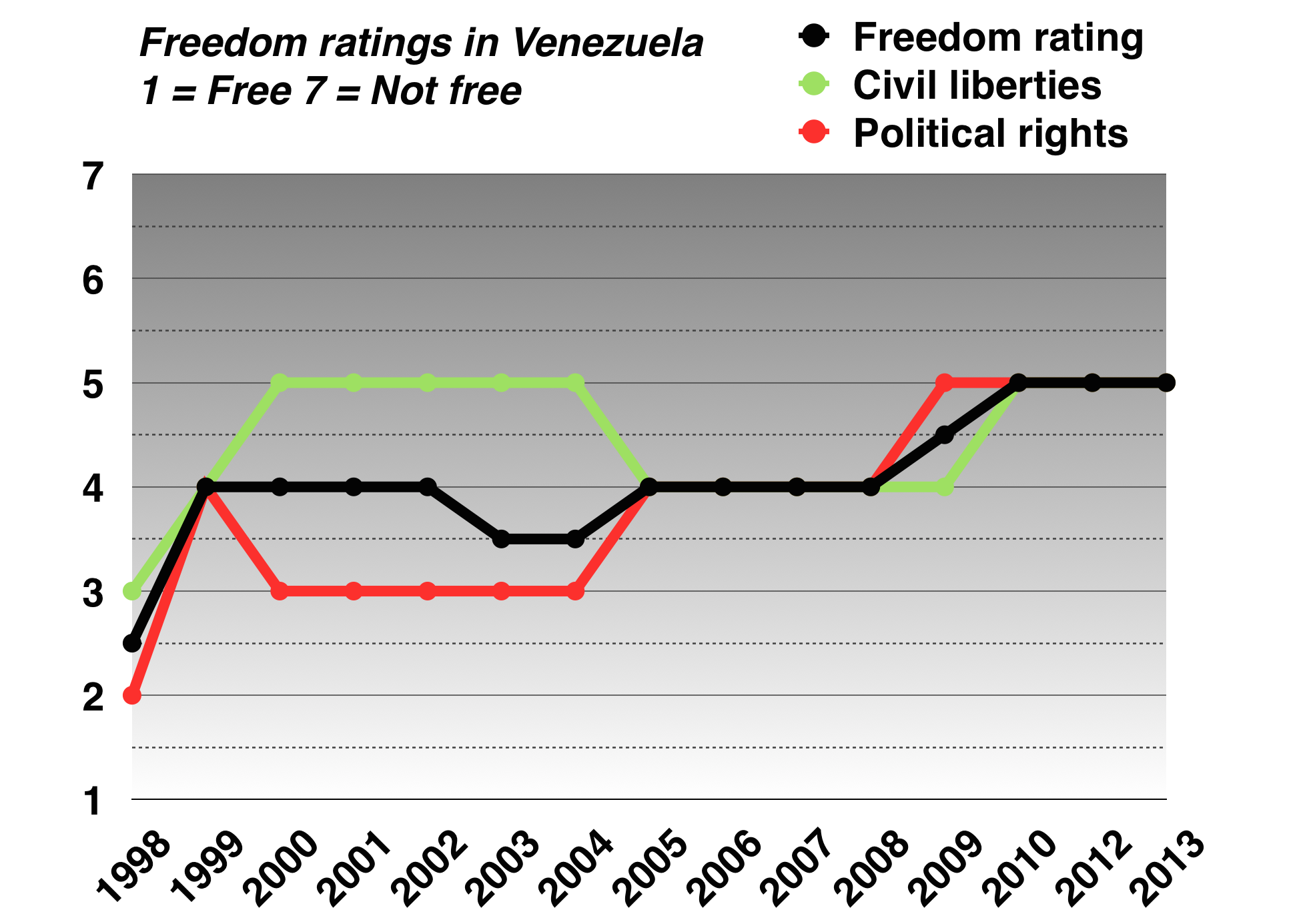
Freedom ratings in Venezuela from 1998 to 2013. (1 = Free, 7 = not free) Source: Freedom House

Shortly after Hugo Chávez's election, ratings for freedom in Venezuela dropped according to political and human rights group Freedom House and Venezuela was rated "partly free". In 2004, Amnesty International criticized Chávez's administration of not handling the 2002 coup in a proper manner, saying that violent incidents "have not been investigated effectively and have gone unpunished" and that "impunity enjoyed by the perpetrators encourages further human rights violations in a particularly volatile political climate". Amnesty International also criticized the Venezuelan National Guard and the Direccion de Inteligencia Seguridad y Prevención (DISIP) stating that they "allegedly used excessive force to control the situation on a number of occasions" during protests involving the 2004 Venezuela recall. It was also noted that many of the protesters detained seemed to not be "brought before a judge within the legal time limit".

In 2008, Human Rights Watch released a report reviewing Chávez's human rights record over his first decade in power. The report praises Chávez's 1999 amendments to the constitution which significantly expanded human rights guarantees, as well as mentioning improvements in women's rights and indigenous rights, but noted a "wide range of government policies that have undercut the human rights protections established" by the revised constitution. In particular, the report accused Chávez and his administration of engaging in discrimination on political grounds, eroding the independence of the judiciary, and of engaging in "policies that have undercut journalists' freedom of expression, workers' freedom of association, and civil society's ability to promote human rights in Venezuela". The Venezuelan government retaliated for the report by expelling members of Human Rights Watch from the country. Subsequently, over a hundred Latin American scholars signed a joint letter with the Council on Hemispheric Affairs, a leftist NGO that would defend Chávez and his movement, with the individuals criticizing the Human Rights Watch report for its alleged factual inaccuracy, exaggeration, lack of context, illogical arguments, and heavy reliance on opposition newspapers as sources, among other things.

The International Labour Organization of the United Nations had also expressed concern over voters being pressured to join the party.

In 2009, Judge María Lourdes Afiuni was arrested on charges of corruption after ordering the conditional release on bail of businessman Eligio Cedeño, who then fled the country. She was moved to house arrest in Caracas in February 2011, but she is still barred from practicing law, leaving the country, or using her bank account or social networks. Human rights groups accused Chávez of creating a climate of fear that threatened the independence of the judiciary. Reuters said Afiuni is "considered by opponents and jurists as one of the most emblematic political prisoners" in Venezuela, because Chávez called for her to be imprisoned.

In 2009, the Attorney General announced the creation of an investigative team to examine 6,000 reports of extrajudicial killings between 2000 and 2007.

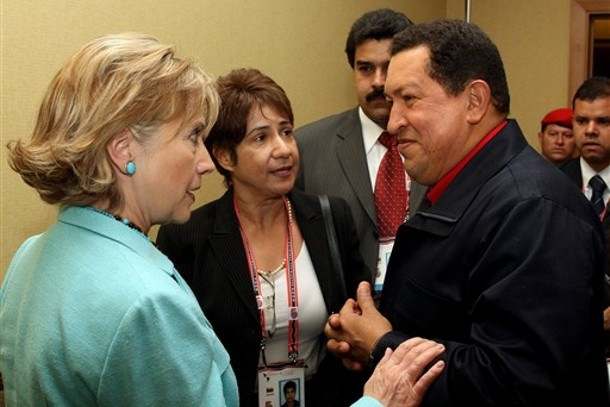
Chávez meets Secretary of State Clinton at the Summit of the Americas on 19 April 2009.

In 2010, Amnesty International criticized the Chávez administration for targeting critics following several politically motivated arrests. Freedom House listed Venezuela as being "partly free" in its 2011 Freedom in the World annual report, noting a recent decline in civil liberties. A 2010 Organization of American States report found concerns with freedom of expression, human rights abuses, authoritarianism, press freedom, threats to democracy, as well as erosion of separation of powers, the economic infrastructure and ability of the president to appoint judges to federal courts. OAS observers were denied access to Venezuela; Chávez rejected the OAS report, pointing out that its authors did not go to Venezuela. Venezuelan ombudswoman Gabriela Ramírez said the report distorted and took statistics out of context, and said that "human rights violations in Venezuela have decreased".

In November 2014, Venezuela appeared before the United Nations Committee Against Torture over cases between 2002 and 2014. Human rights expert of the UN committee, Felice D. Gaer, noted that in "only 12 public officials have been convicted of human rights violations in the last decade when in the same period have been more than 5,000 complaints". The United Nations stated that there were 31,096 complaints of human rights violations received between 2011 and 2014. Of the 31,096 complaints, 3% of the cases resulted in only in an indictment by the Venezuelan Public Ministry.

===== Allegations of antisemitism =====
Chavez's opposition to Zionism and close relations with Iran led to accusations of antisemitism. Such claims were made by the Venezuelan Jewish community at a World Jewish Congress Plenary Assembly in Jerusalem, after Venezuela's oldest synagogue was vandalised by armed men. In 2006, the Simon Wiesenthal Center published a shortened version of a speech by Chávez, which significantly changed its meaning to make it appear that he had made anti-Semitic remarks. The New York Daily News, the Los Angeles Times, and the Wall Street Journal published the Wiesenthal Center's claim. The Confederation of Jewish Associations of Venezuela, the American Jewish Committee and the American Jewish Congress said that Chavez's comments were not aimed at Jews, but rather at "the white oligarchy that has dominated the region since the colonial era". In 2009, attacks on a synagogue in Caracas were alleged to be influenced by "vocal denunciations of Israel" by the Venezuelan state media and Hugo Chávez, even though Chavez promptly condemned the attacks, blaming an "oligarchy". A weeklong investigation by the Venezuelan CICPC concluded the synagogue attack to be an 'inside job', the motive apparently being robbery rather than antisemitism.

=== Media and the press ===
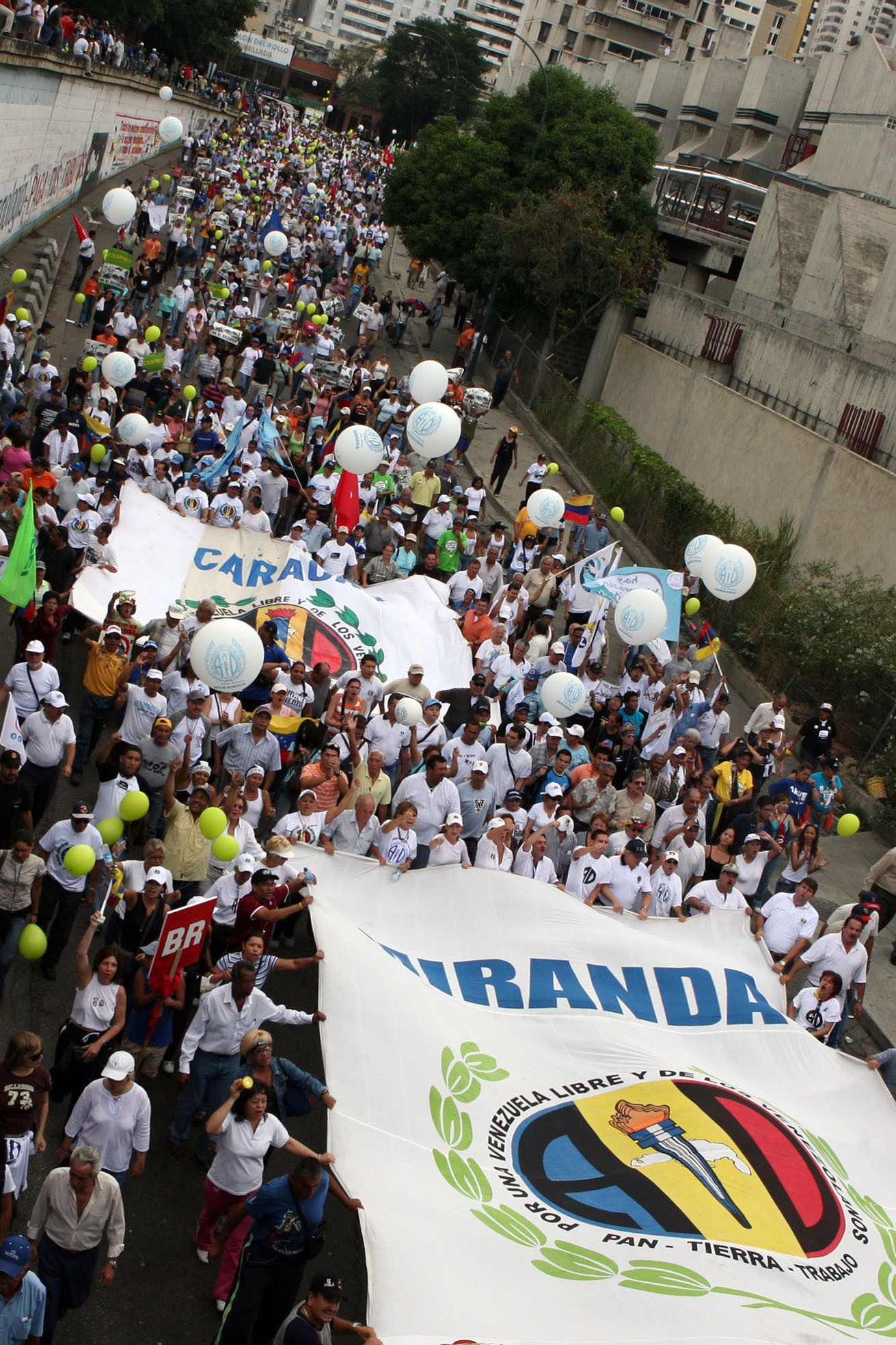
Venezuelans protesting against the closing of RCTV

Under Chávez, press freedom declined while censorship in Venezuela increased. He used state-run bodies to silence the media and to disseminate Bolivarian propaganda. Other actions included pressuring media organizations to sell to those related to his government or to face closure.

Human Rights Watch criticized Chávez for engaging in "often discriminatory policies that have undercut journalists' freedom of expression". Reporters Without Borders criticized the Chávez administration for "steadily silencing its critics".

In 2004, Chávez used the National Commission of Telecommunications and the Social Responsibility in Radio, Television and Electronic Media law to officially censor media organizations.

Chávez inaugurated TeleSUR in July 2005, a Pan-American news channel similar to Al Jazeera, which sought to challenge Latin American television news by Univision and the United States–based CNN en Español. In 2006, Chávez inaugurated a state-funded movie studio called Villa del Cine (English: Cinema City).

In the group's 2009 Press Freedom Index, Reporters Without Borders noted that "Venezuela is now among the region's worst press freedom offenders." Freedom House listed Venezuela's press as being "Not Free" in its 2011 Map of Press Freedom, noting that "[t]he gradual erosion of press freedom in Venezuela continued in 2010."

Chávez also had a Twitter account with more than 3,200,000 followers as of August 2012. A team of 200 people sorted through suggestions and comments sent via Twitter. Chávez said Twitter was "another mechanism for contact with the public, to evaluate many things and to help many people", and that he saw Twitter as "a weapon that also needs to be used by the revolution".

=== Foreign policy ===
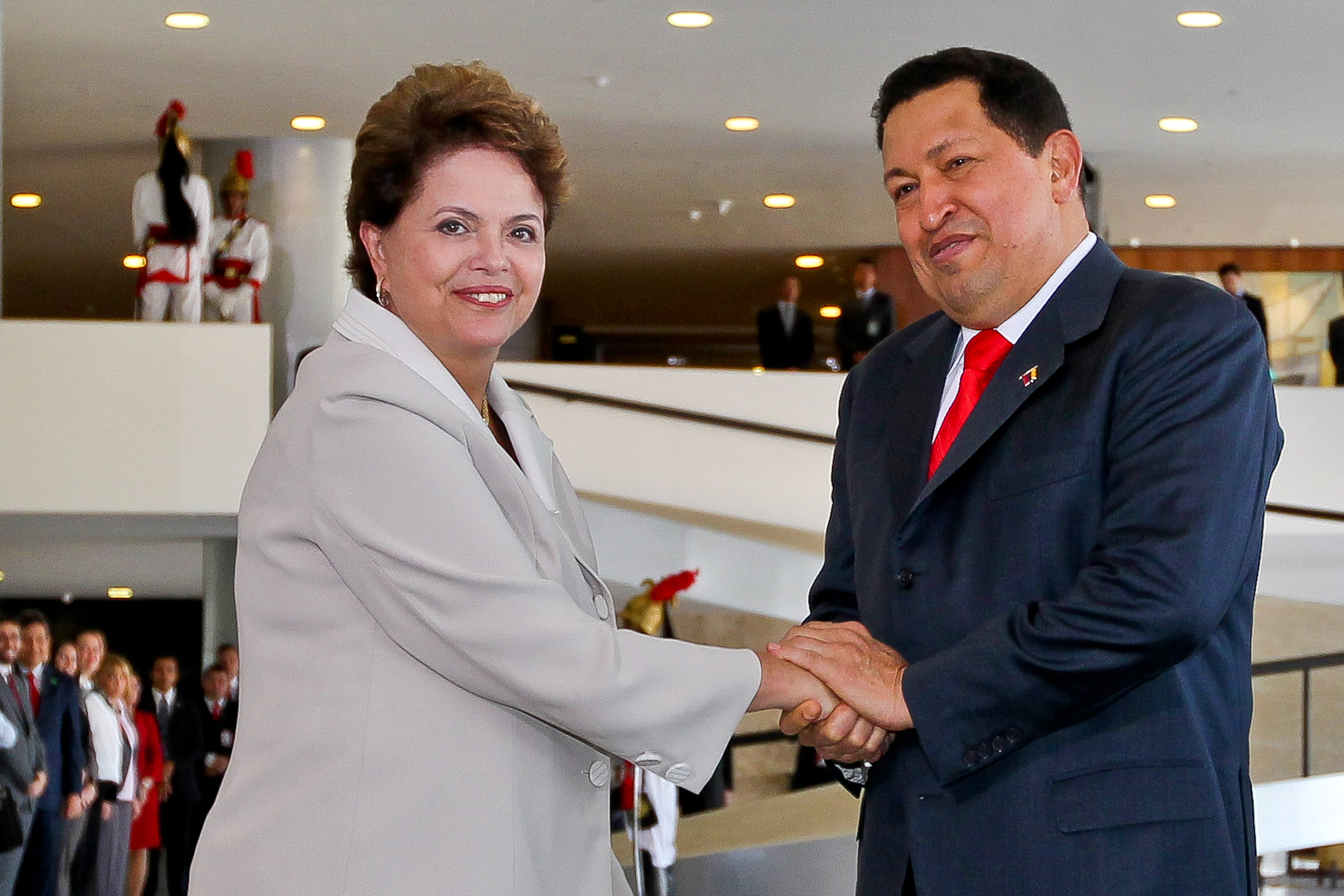
Chávez with Brazilian President Dilma Rousseff in Brasília, 6 June 2011

Though Chávez inspired other movements in Latin America to follow his model of chavismo in an attempt to reshape South America, it was later seen as being erratic and his influence internationally became exaggerated. Domestic mishandling of the country under Chávez prevented Venezuela from strengthening its position in the world.

According to communications studies academic Stuart Davis, Chávez's foreign policy aimed to promote South–South cooperation. He refocused Venezuelan foreign policy on Latin American economic and social integration by enacting bilateral trade and reciprocal aid agreements, including his so-called "oil diplomacy" making Venezuela more dependent on using oil, its main commodity, and increasing its longterm vulnerability. Chávez also focused on a variety of multinational institutions to promote his vision of Latin American integration, including Petrocaribe, Petrosur, and TeleSUR. Bilateral trade relationships with other Latin American countries also played a major role in his policy, with Chávez increasing arms purchases from Brazil, forming oil-for-expertise trade arrangements with Cuba, and creating unique barter arrangements that exchange Venezuelan petroleum for cash-strapped Argentina's meat and dairy products.

Chávez also aligned himself with authoritarian nations and radical movements that were seen as being anti-Western, with relations with Cuba and Iran becoming a particular importance. He also befriended pariah states such as Belarus and Iran. In particular, relations between Venezuela and the United States deteriorated markedly as Chávez became highly critical of the foreign policy of the United States, opposing the U.S.-led 2003 invasion of Iraq and condemning the NATO-led 2011 military intervention in Libya. Relations thawed somewhat under President Barack Obama in June 2009, only to steadily deteriorate once again shortly afterwards.

== Personal life ==
Chávez married twice. He first wed Nancy Coromoto Colmenares (d. 2022), a woman from a poor family in Chávez's hometown of Sabaneta. Chávez and Colmenares remained married for 18 years, during which time they had three children: Rosa Virginia, born on September 6, 1978 in Maracay, María Gabriela, born on March 12, 1980 in Barinas and Hugo Rafael, born on October 14, 1982 in Barinas; the last of whom suffers from behavioural problems. The couple separated soon after Chávez's 1992 coup attempt. During his first marriage, Chávez had an affair with historian Herma Marksman; their relationship lasted nine years. Chávez's second wife was journalist Marisabel Rodríguez de Chávez, from whom he separated in 2002 and divorced in 2004. Through that marriage, Chávez had another daughter, Rosinés, born on September 23, 1997 in Barquisimeto. When Chávez was released from prison in 1994, he initiated affairs with women that had been his followers. Allegations were also made that Chávez was a womanizer throughout both his marriages, having encounters with actresses, journalists, ministers, and ministers' daughters. The allegations remained unproven and are contradicted by statements provided by other figures close to him, though one retired aide shared that while Chávez was married to Marisabel and afterward, he participated in liaisons with women and gave them gifts, with some rumors among his aides stating that some of the women bore children from Chávez.

On May 1, 2005, his fifth daughter, Génesis María, was born in Chacao Municipality; the fruit of his relationship with Barinese, Bexhi Lisette Segura (1971); who was the Venezuelan Consul in Guayaquil and on May 3, 2008, his last daughter, Sara Manuela, was born in Baruta Municipality; the fruit of his relationship with the flight attendant, Nidia Coromoto Fajardo (1966); who was the Venezuelan consul in Lisbon and Montreal, respectively.

He also had five grandchildren: Gabriela Alejandra Rivero, born on April 18, 1998 (daughter of María), Manuel Alejandro Prieto, born on September 1, 2003 and Jorge Alejandro Arreaza, born on September 18, 2007 (sons of Rosa) and Hugo Rafael, born on March 9, 2013 and Miranda, born on November 2, 2014 (children of "Huguito") and a great-grandson, Paulo Aponte; born in August 2025 (son of Gabriela).

Those who were very close to Chávez felt that he had bipolar disorder. Salvador Navarrete, a physician who treated Chávez during his first years in the presidency, believed that Chávez was bipolar. In 2010, Alberto Müller Rojas, then vice president of Chávez's party, PSUV, stated that Chávez had "a tendency toward cyclothymia—mood swings that range from moments of extreme euphoria to moments of despondence". A different explanation was that such behavior was a tactic used by Chávez to attack opponents and polarize.

Chávez was raised as a Catholic, and he intended at one time to become a priest. He saw his socialist policies as having roots in the teachings of Jesus Christ (liberation theology), and he publicly used the slogan of "Christ is with the Revolution!" Although he traditionally kept his own faith a private matter, Chávez over the course of his presidency became increasingly open to discussing his religious views, stating that he interpreted Jesus as a Communist. He was, in general, a liberal Catholic, some of whose declarations were disturbing to the religious community of his country. At one point in 2008, he said that an afterlife does not exist. He also believed in Charles Darwin's theory of evolution, stating that "it is a lie that God created man from the ground". However, Chavez also stated "Our Bolivarian revolution is very Christian and I have a friend who isn't Christian, but lately has said he is a Christian in the social aspect: his name is Fidel Castro."

He cursed the state of Israel, and he had some disputes with both the Venezuelan Catholic clergy and Protestant groups like the New Tribes Mission, whose evangelical leader he "condemned to hell". In addition, he showed syncretistic practices such as the worship of the Venezuelan goddess María Lionza. In his last years, after he discovered he had cancer, Chávez became more attached to the Catholic Church.

== Illness ==
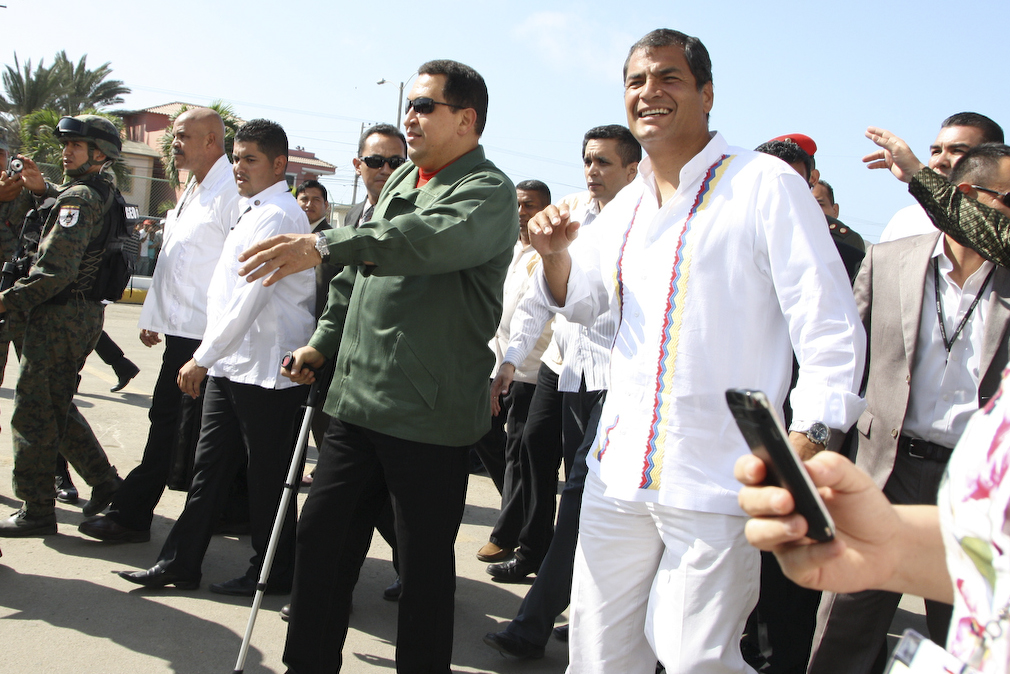
Chávez walking with a cane accompanied by Ecuadorian president Rafael Correa in Caracas in July 2011, shortly after his first cancer surgery

On 30 June 2011, Chávez revealed in a televised address from Havana, Cuba, that he was recovering from two operations in Cuba, including an operation to remove an abscessed tumor with cancerous cells in the pelvic region. During the speech, he was noticeably thinner and paler and had a serious and at times sad expression, and stated that he regretted his lack of medical checkups. Analysts theorized that he was suffering from colorectal cancer. He returned to Venezuela from Cuba on 4 July, but on 17 July 2011, he returned to Cuba for further cancer treatments. At that time, some powers were delegated to cabinet ministers but he resisted requests by the opposition to give up all powers during his absence.

Chávez gave a public appearance on 28 July 2011, his 57th birthday, in which he stated that his health troubles had led him to radically reorient his life towards a "more diverse, more reflective and multi-faceted" outlook.

On 9 July 2012, Chávez declared himself fully recovered from cancer just three months before the 2012 Venezuelan presidential election, which he won, securing a fourth term as president. In November 2012, Chávez announced plans to travel to Cuba for more medical treatment for cancer.

On 8 December 2012, Chávez announced he would undergo another operation after doctors in Cuba detected malignant cells; the operation took place on 11 December 2012. Chávez suffered complications from the surgery including a respiratory tract infection as well as unexpected bleeding. It was announced on 3 January 2013, that Chávez had a severe lung infection that had caused respiratory failures following a strict treatment regimen for respiratory insufficiency; he was then breathing through a tracheal tube but was giving orders to ministers by writing them down. However, he was reported to have overcome the infection by 26 January and was then undergoing further treatment. On 18 February 2013, Chávez returned to Venezuela after two months of cancer treatment in Cuba. On 1 March 2013, after opposition leader Henrique Capriles accused the government of lying about Chávez's condition, Vice President Nicolás Maduro said that Chávez had been receiving chemotherapy in Venezuela following his surgery in Cuba and "continues his battle for life". A Mass, broadcast on live television, was held in the hospital in which Chávez was staying. On 4 March, it was announced that Chávez's breathing problems had worsened and he was suffering a new, severe respiratory tract infection.

== Death ==
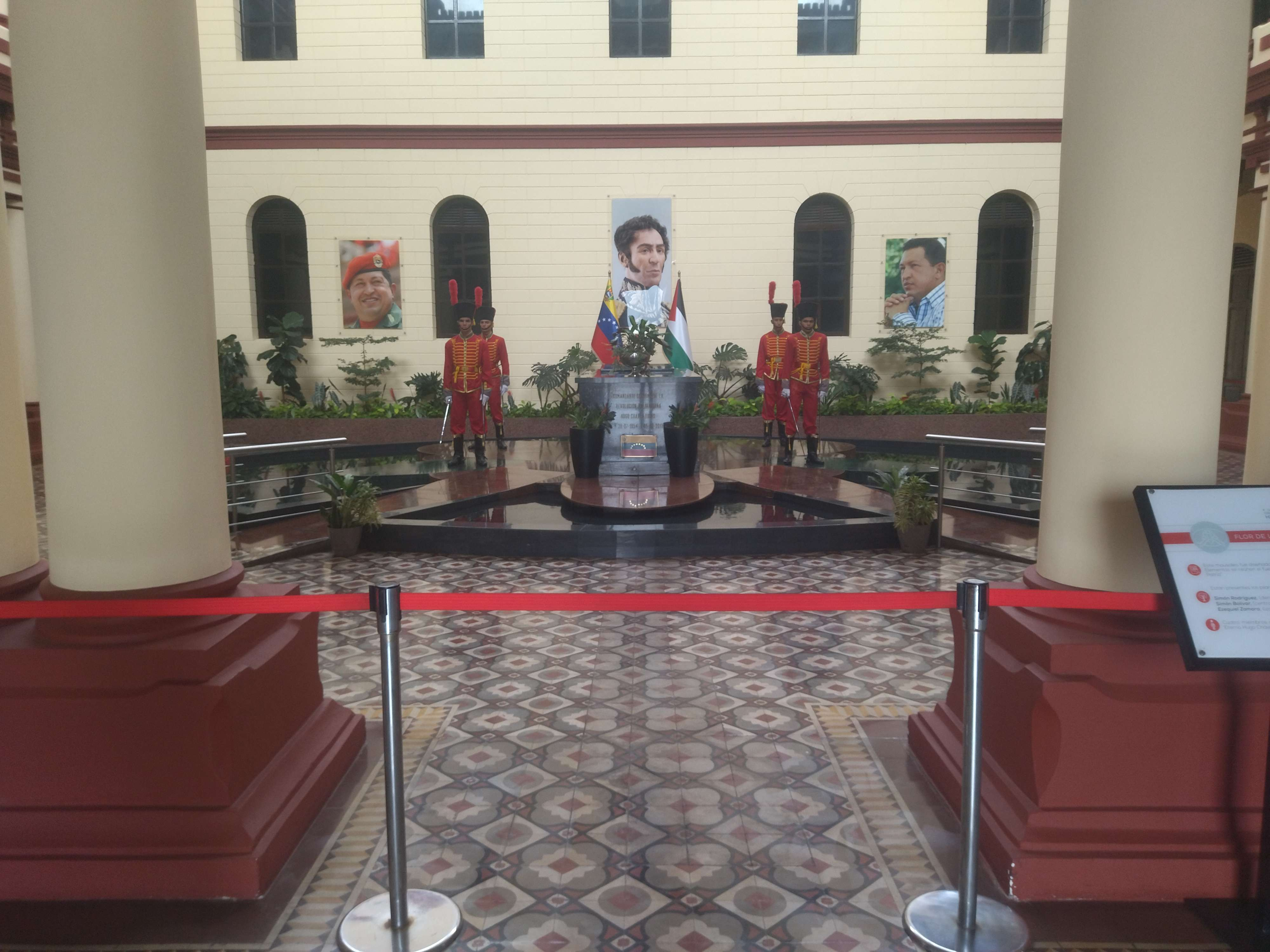
Mausoleum where the remains of Hugo Chávez currently rest in Caracas.

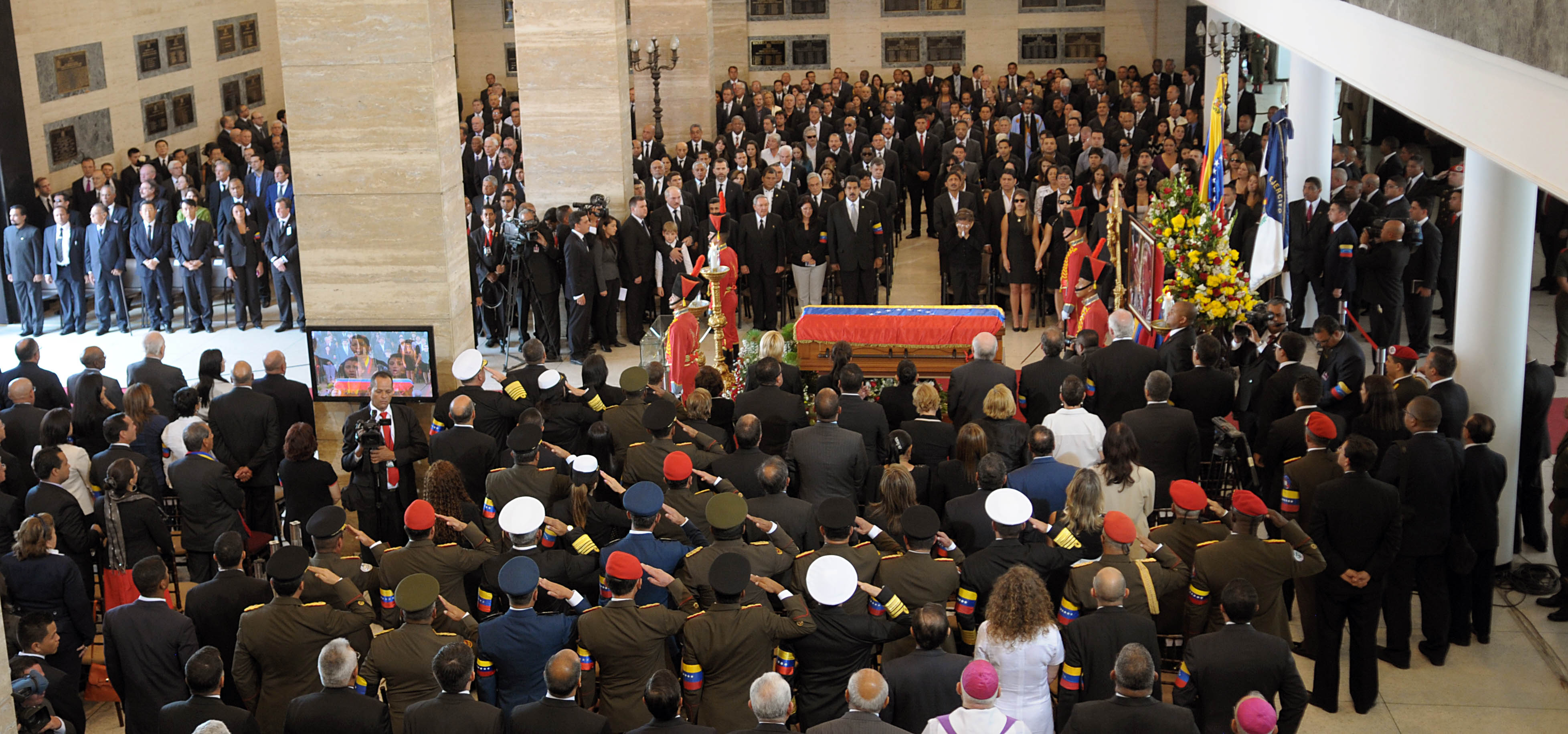
The public paying their respects at Chavez's funeral 8 March 2013

Venezuela's hybrid regime, after Chávez's death, became more selectively accommodating on the inside and more explicitly repressive on the outside. This allowed the regime to survive, but not to thrive. Regime survival was purchased at the cost of policy immobilism. And policy immobilism has left Venezuela with the deepest economic crisis in Venezuela's history.

— Corales and Penfold, Dragon in the Tropics: The Legacy of Hugo Chávez

On 5 March 2013, Vice President Nicolás Maduro announced on state television that Chávez had died in a military hospital in Caracas at 16:25 VET (20:55 UTC). Maduro said Chávez died "after battling a tough illness for nearly two years". According to the head of Venezuela's presidential guard, Chávez died from a massive heart attack, and his cancer of the pelvic region was very advanced when he died. José Ornella said that near the end of his life Chávez "couldn't speak but he said it with his lips ... 'No quiero morir, por favor no me dejen morir' ('I don't want to die. Please don't let me die'), because he loved his country, he sacrificed himself for his country". Chávez is survived by four children and four grandchildren.

Chávez was entombed in a marble sarcophagus at the Mountain Barracks in Caracas. His death triggered a constitutional requirement that a presidential election be called within 30 days. Maduro, Chavez's vice president, was elected president on 14 April 2013.

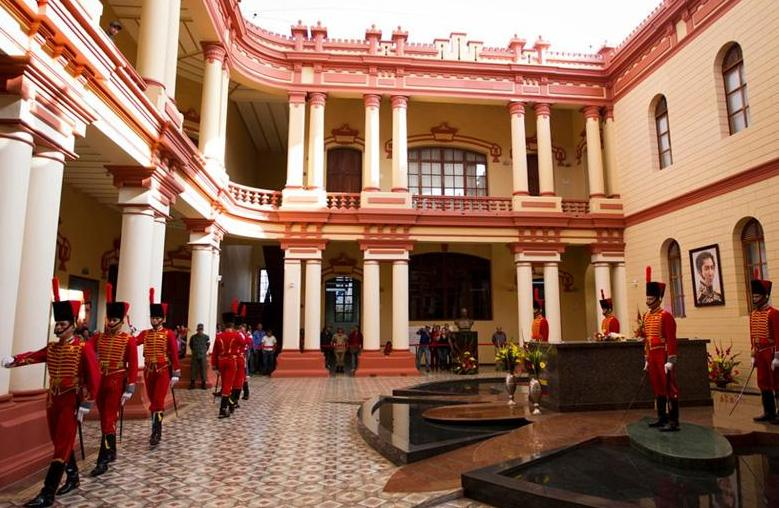
Mausoleum of Hugo Chávez in Caracas

=== Rumors surrounding Chávez's death ===
After defecting from Venezuela, former bodyguard for Chávez, Leamsy Salazar, stated that he died in December 2012, months before his death was officially announced. In July 2018, former Attorney General Luisa Ortega Díaz also said that Chávez had actually died in December 2012 and the announcement of his death was delayed for political reasons. In an interview cited by Venezuelan daily El Nacional, the former Chávez supporter said that the Venezuelan president died on 28 December, but his closest allies decided to delay the announcement and never submitted the death certificate to the Office of the Attorney General. The supposed delay in announcing Chávez's death raised concerns that laws signed in his name during that period were forged for political purposes.

== Honors and awards ==
Award or decoration	Country	Date	Place	Note
Order of José Martí	Cuba	17 November 1999	Havana	Cuban highest order of merit.
Grand Collar of the Order of Prince Henry	Portugal	8 November 2001	Lisbon	For exceptional and outstanding merit to Portugal and its culture
Order of Carlos Manuel de Céspedes	Cuba	14 December 2004	Havana	
First Class of the Order of the Islamic Republic of Iran	Iran	29 July 2006	Tehran	Highest national medal of Iran.
Order of the Friendship of Peoples	Belarus	23 July 2008	Minsk	Highest Belarusian award for foreigners.
Order of the Umayyads	Syria	27 June 2010	Caracas	Syrian highest order of merit.
Uatsamonga Order	South Ossetia	23 July 2010	Caracas	South Ossetian highest order of merit.
Order of the Republic of Serbia	Serbia	6 March 2013	Belgrade	Serbian highest order of merit. Awarded posthumously.
Order of Francisco Morazán	Honduras	27 January 2014	Tegucigalpa	Honduran highest order of merit. Awarded posthumously.
Star of Palestine	Palestine	16 May 2014	Caracas	Palestinian highest order of merit. Awarded posthumously.

=== Recognition ===
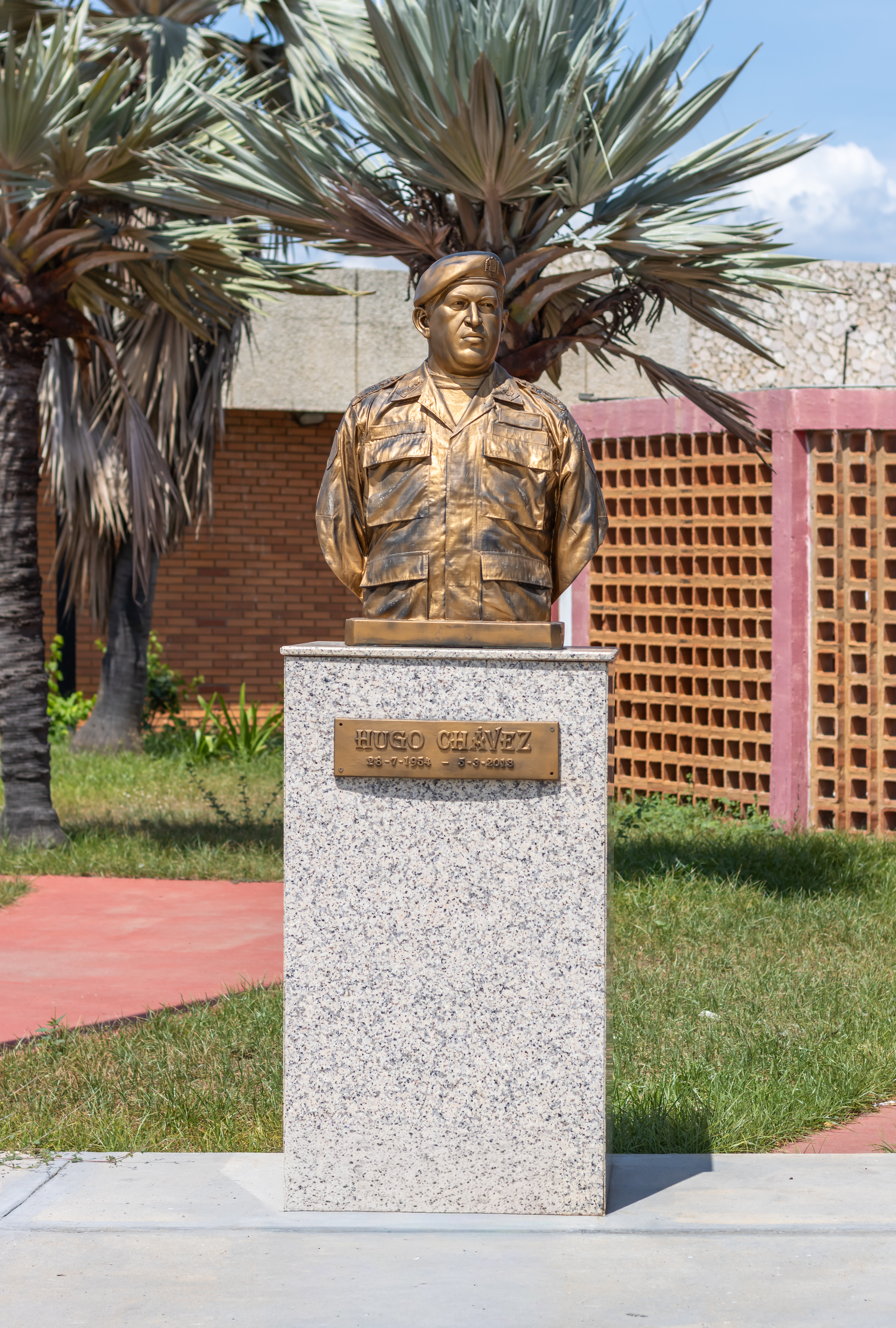
A bust of Chávez

The United States–based Time magazine included Chávez among their list of the world's 100 most influential people in 2005 and 2006, noting the spreading of his anti-globalization efforts and anti-US sentiment throughout Latin America. In a 2006 list compiled by the left-wing British magazine New Statesman, he was voted 11th in the list of "Heroes of our time". In 2010 the magazine included Chávez in its annual The World's 50 Most Influential Figures. His biographers Marcano and Tyszka believed that within only a few years of his presidency, he "had already earned his place in history as the president most loved and most despised by the Venezuelan people, the president who inspired the greatest zeal and the deepest revulsion at the same time".

In the Belarus's capital Minsk a park was named after Chávez on 18 October 2014. In addition in Al-Bireh and in Moscow, streets were also named after Chávez.

=== Honorary degrees ===
Chávez was awarded the following honorary degrees:

- Kyung Hee University, South Korea; Honorary Doctorate in Political Science – Granted by Rector Chungwon Choue on 16 October 1999.
- Universidad Autónoma de Santo Domingo, Dominican Republic; Honorary Doctorate in Jurisprudence, 9 March 2001.
- University of Brasília, Brazil; Honorary Doctorate – Granted by Rector Alberto Pérez on 3 April 2001.
- Universidad Nacional de Ingeniería, Nicaragua; Honorary Doctorate in Engineering – Granted by Rector Aldo Urbina in May 2001.
- Diplomatic Academy of the Ministry of Foreign Affairs, Russia; Honorary Doctorate, 15 May 2001.
- Beijing University, China; Honorary Doctorate in Economics, 24 May 2001.
- Higher University of San Andrés, Bolivia; Honorary Doctorate, 24 January 2006.
- UARCIS, Chile; Honorary Doctorate – Granted by Rector Carlos Margotta Trincado on 7 March 2006.
- University of Damascus, Syria; Honorary Doctorate – Granted by Rector Wael Moualla on 30 August 2006.
- University of Tripoli, Libya; Honorary Doctorate in Economy and Human Sciences, 23 October 2010.

== In popular culture ==
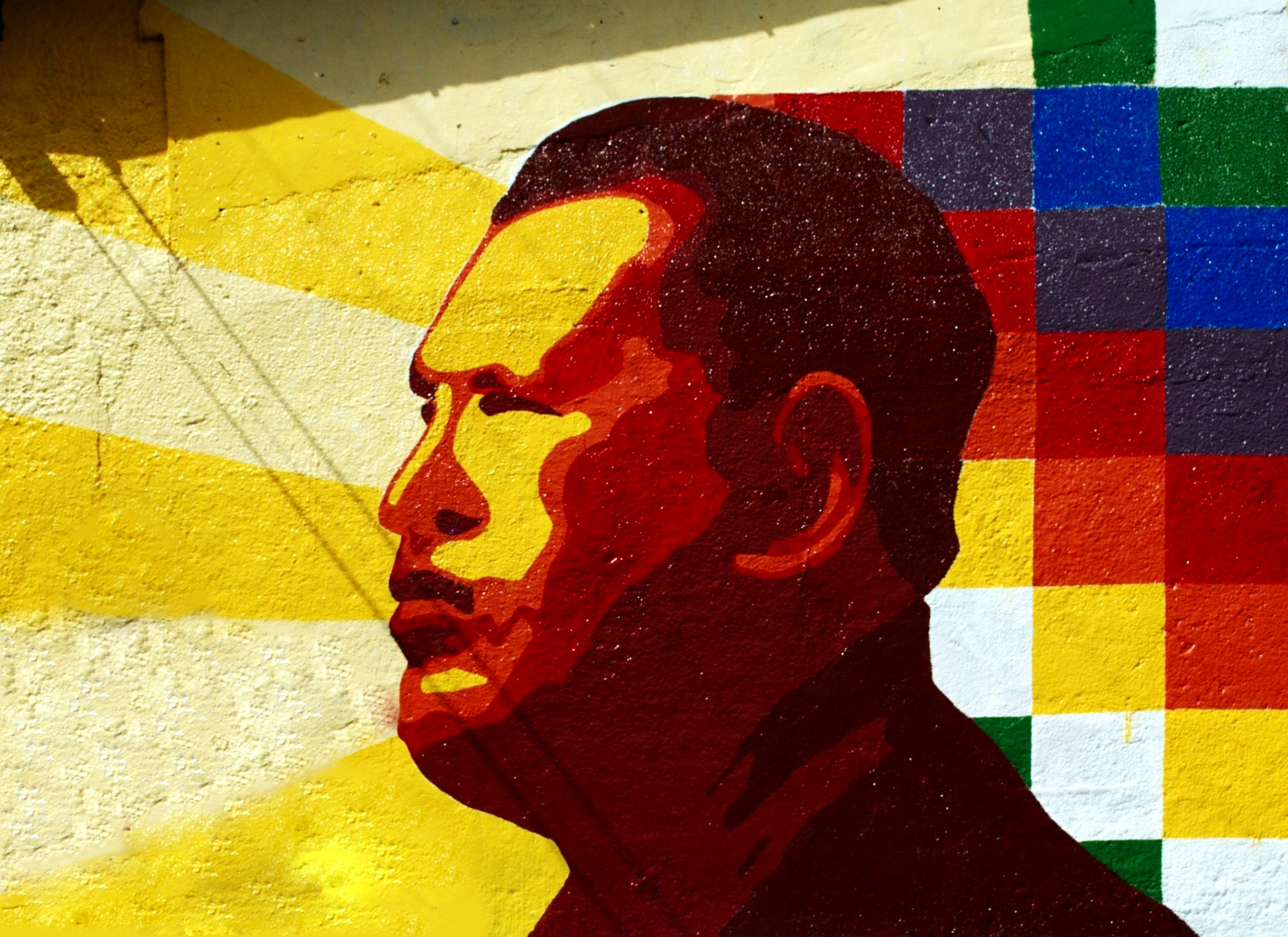
A mural of Hugo Chávez in Mérida city

- Syndicated cartoonists from around the world created cartoons, illustrations, and videos of Hugo Chávez's controversial political career and the reactions to his death.
- Chávez was indirectly/subliminally portrayed in two Venezuelan telenovelas from the 2000s, which were critical of his government: A Calzón Quitado from 2001 (with the character of Pedro Elías Ferrer), produced by RCTV, and Cosita rica from 2003 (with the character of Olegario Pérez), produced by Venevisión. In both telenovelas Chávez was "played" by the actor Carlos Cruz, with whom he shares a similar physical appearance. His ex-wife (current wife at that moment), Marisabel Rodríguez, was also portrayed in the first production, by Alba Roversi (with the character of Clara Inés Ramírez).
- Oliver Stone directed the 2009 documentary South of the Border, where he "sets out on a road trip across five countries to explore the social and political movements as well as the mainstream media's misperception of South America, while interviewing seven of its elected presidents". Chávez appears in one segment being interviewed by Stone.
- In 2011, he appeared in the game Postal III.
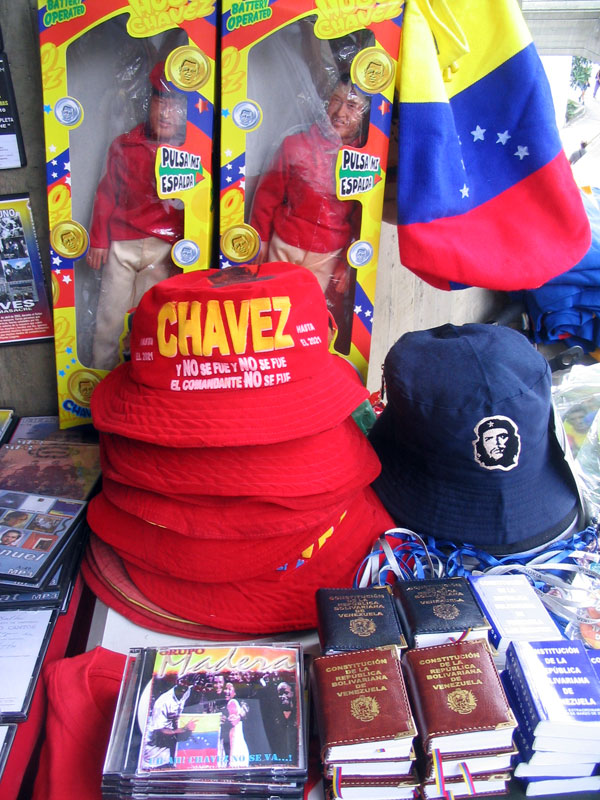
  Bolivarian memorabilia for sale in Venezuela, 2006
- On 5 March 2014, Oliver Stone and teleSUR released the documentary film Mi amigo Hugo (My Friend Hugo), a documentary about his political life, one year after his death.
- Hugo Chávez and most of the other Latin American and Spanish presidents are parodied in the animated web page Isla Presidencial.
- The 2016 documentary El ocaso del socialismo mágico explores the effects of Chávez's populism and his victory in the 1998 presidential elections, as well as his mistakes.
- Sony Pictures Television produces a TV series called El Comandante about the life of Hugo Chávez with 102 episodes.
- The 2018 documentary Chavismo: The Plague of the 21st Century (Spanish: Chavismo: la peste del siglo XXI), analysis of the causes, social, political and economic that caused the rise of Chávez as president of Venezuela; "his abuse of power and the response of civil society, including the student movement; his political fall and as the secrecy that surrounded his illness and the succession of Nicolás Maduro".
- The documentary film released in 2018 El pueblo soy yo (English: I am the people), directed by Venezuelan filmmaker Carlos Oteyza and produced by Mexican historian Enrique Krauze, explores the populism of Chávez.

== Notes ==
Party political offices
New office	Leader of the Fifth Republic Movement; 1997–2007	Position abolished
New office	Leader of the United Socialist Party of Venezuela; 2007–2013	Succeeded by Nicolás Maduro
Political offices
Preceded by Rafael Caldera	President of Venezuela; 1999–2013	Succeeded by Nicolás Maduro
