= Bolivarian Revolution in film =

The Bolivarian Revolution, and related Crisis in Venezuela, have been depicted in several films, both fiction and documentary.

In reference to Latin American, but specifically several Venezuelan, films of the 21st century, Kapur and Wagner wrote that film is "an important medium" for representations of the area and that there is "enduring importance of Latin America in the international struggle to break from neoliberalism."^{:113} They compare the conflicts within the Bolivarian Revolution's bases to the conflicts in Venezuelan filmmaking between the Villa del Cine and independent producers;^{:121} though the Villa del Cine promotes films with a feeling of "the revolutionary context of Venezuela", its process aims to mimic a Hollywood studio system, marginalizing representation and the communal nature of revolution.^{:122}

Several writers on film also suggest that Western filmmakers are "drawn to" and document the Bolivarian Revolution and Crisis in Venezuela,^{:113-122} and conclude that accurate media representations of the situation in the country are important.^{:130} Kapur and Wagner complement some independent national filmmakers for achieving this; they have also criticized films depicting the revolution made both by the Villa del Cine, for turning stories of revolution into romanticized narratives, and internationally, for not managing to present complex full stories of the situation.^{:113-122}

In line with the propaganda nature of national Venezuelan media, depictions of the revolution as successful are often circulated in the nation, with 2002's The Revolution Will Not Be Televised and 2004's Puente Llaguno: Claves de una Masacre still shown regularly as of 2016.^{:236} Comparatively, depictions of the revolution in a negative light may be censored: in 2019, the horror film Infección, in which characters claim the zombie apocalypse at the center of the narrative was caused by the revolution, was banned.

== Documentaries ==
Year	Title	Country	Director	Ref.
2002	The Revolution Will Not Be Televised	Ireland	Kim Bartley and Donnacha Ó Briain	
2004	Chavez, Venezuela, and the New Latin America	Cuba	Aleida Guevara	
2004	Puente Llaguno: Claves de una Masacre	Venezuela	Ángel Palacios	
2004	X-Ray of a Lie	Venezuela	Wolfgang Schalk	
2006	¿¡Revolución!?	Canada	Charles Gervais	
2007	The People and the President: A Portrait of the Bolivarian Revolution	Norway	Strønen and Wærness	
2008	Venezuela: Revolution from the Inside Out	United States	Clifton Ross	
2009	Inside the Revolution: A Journey into the Heart of Venezuela	United Kingdom	Pablo Navarrete	
2009	South of the Border	United States	Oliver Stone	
2009	Listen to Venezuela	United States	Jyotsna Kapur and Keith B. Wagner	
2014	"From the Brink: Venezuela Rising"	United States	Joseph Melhuish	
2014	"Venezuela Divided" episode of Fault Lines	United States		
2015	Flor de la Mar	Venezuela	Jorge Thielen Armand	
2016	El ocaso del socialismo mágico	Italy Venezuela	Michele Calabresi	
2017	In the Shadow of the Revolution	Venezuela, United States	J. Arturo Albarrán and Clifton Ross	
2018	Chavismo: The Plague of the 21st Century	Venezuela	Gustavo Tovar-Arroyo	
2018	El pueblo soy yo	Venezuela	Carlos Oteyza	
2019	Colateral	Venezuela	Lucrecia Cisneros	
2020	A La Calle	Venezuela	Maxx Caicedo and Nelson G. Navarrete	
2020	The Crossing	Colombia	Juliana Peñaranda-Loftus	

== Fiction films ==
Year	Title	Country	Director	Ref.
2005	Secuestro Express	Venezuela	Jonathan Jakubowicz	
2006	Maroa	Venezuela	Solveig Hoogesteijn	
2009	Libertador Morales, el Justiciero	Venezuela	Efterpi Charlambidis	
2010	Hermano	Venezuela	Marcel Rasquin	
2012	Blue and Not So Pink	Venezuela	Miguel Ferrari	
2013	Bad Hair	Venezuela	Mariana Rondón	
2015	From Afar	Venezuela	Lorenzo Vigas	
2016	La Soledad	Venezuela	Jorge Thielen Armand	
2017	The Family	Venezuela	Gustavo Rondón	
2019	Infección	Venezuela	Flavio Pedota	
2020	La Fortaleza	Venezuela	Jorge Thielen Armand	

== See also ==
- Public image of Hugo Chávez
- Venezuelan cinema in the 2020s
