= Special Action Forces =

Special tactical police of Venezuela

- Fuerzas de Acciones Especiales
- Active: April 2016; 9 years ago
- Country: Venezuela
- Branch: Venezuelan National Police
- Type: Police tactical unit
- Size: 800-1000
- Nickname: FAES

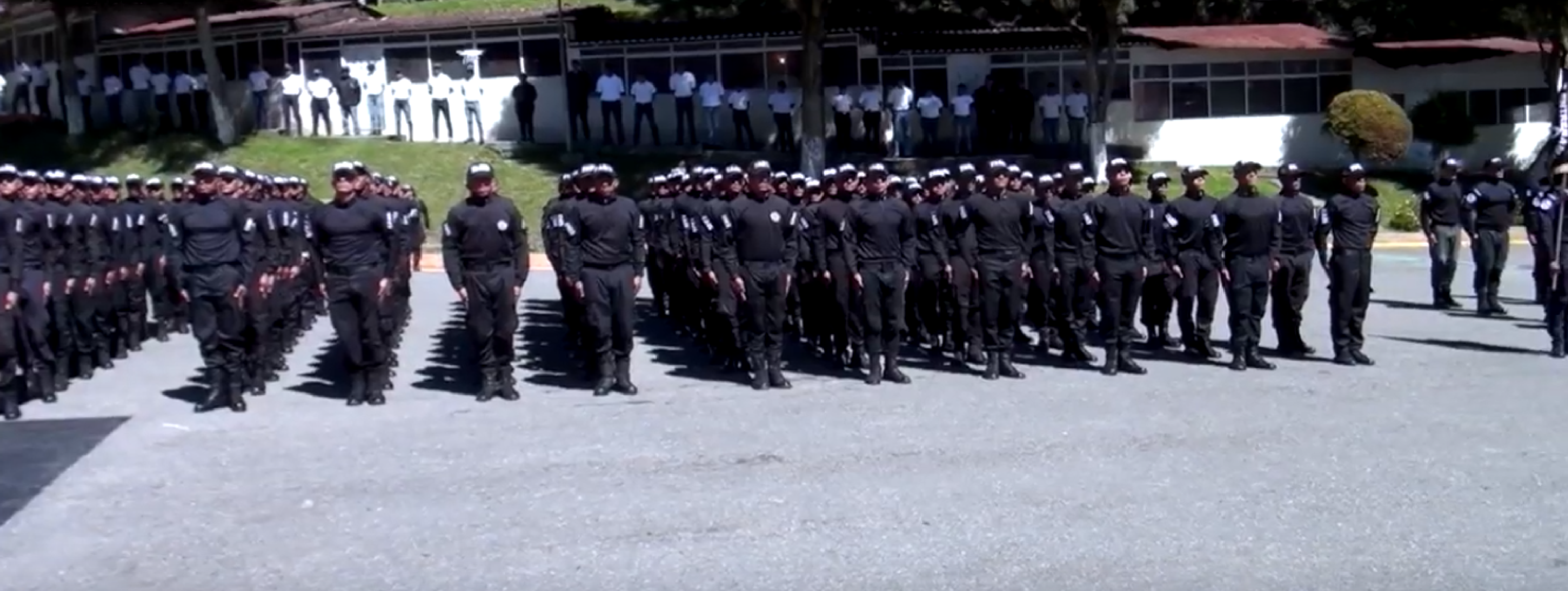
FAES officials

The Special Action Forces (Spanish: Fuerzas de Acciones Especiales de la Policía Nacional Bolivariana, FAES) is an elite command of the Venezuelan National Police created in April 2016. By 2019, it had around 1,300 officers. The FAES includes the Unidad de Operaciones Tácticas Especiales (UOTE) a police tactical unit. The FAES have been accused of being a political instrument of Nicolás Maduro, as well as being a death squad and of repressing the opposition.

== History ==
The complaints by local NGOs and international organizations against the People's Liberation Operation forced Nicolás Maduro's administration to abandon the security policy, but kept the same dynamic in a different security force, the Special Armed Forces (FAES). According to Luis Izquiel, specialist in citizen security, the FAES resulted the "same or worse" in human rights violations.

The FAES have been accused of being a political instrument of Nicolás Maduro, as well as being a death squad and of repressing the opposition.

Between May and November 2017, of the 403 that security forces participated in the Caracas Metropolitan Area, 124 (31%) were attributed to the FAES, which at the same time were responsible for 62% of the killings caused by the National Police.

PROVEA, a Venezuelan human rights group, denounced the FAES of killing more than 100 people in low-income neighborhoods in the six months leading up to January 2019 during the protests in Venezuela.

On 5 July 2019 the UN High Commissioner for Human Rights, Michelle Bachelet, released a report presenting evidence of the murder of at least 6,800 Venezuelans from January 2018 to May 2019 by various security forces including the FAES. The report included documentation of instances of torture, including waterboarding and electric shocks. The regime deemed it as "biased". Bachelet included among her report's recommendations to disband the FAES and open an independent investigation of their actions. Few days after the report was published, Nicolás Maduro appeared publicly with FAES officers, praising them. Although Maduro's administration alleged that the report was plagued with "falsehoods", it has worked along Bachelet's Office. On a September 2020 update of the human rights situation of Venezuela, Bachelet stressed FAES' actions again and informed that according to the Public Ministry, seventy FAES officers had been indicted in several states.

== Equipment ==
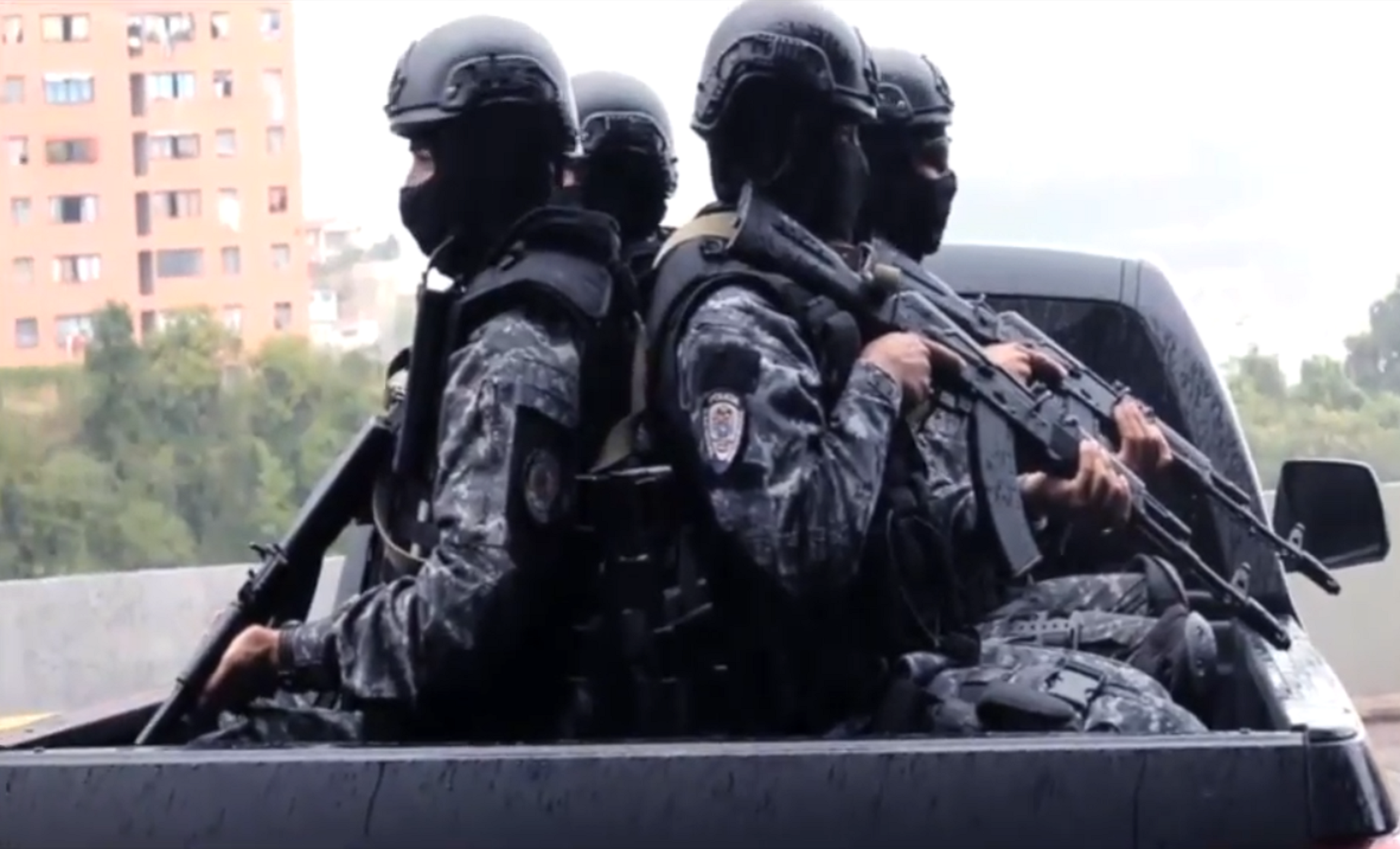

- Beretta Px4
- Beretta M92
- Glock 17
- Heckler & Koch MP5
- AK-103
- AR-15
- M4 Carbine

== In popular culture ==
The 2019 documentary Colateral, directed by Venezuelan journalist Lucrecia Cisneros, explores the consequences of extrajudicial executions in Venezuela by security forces, including by the FAES.
