= Infection (2019 film) =

- Spanish: Infección
- Directed by: Flavio Pedota
- Written by: Flavio Pedota
- Produced by: Santiago Ortiz-Monasterio; Will Pacheco
- Starring: Rubén Guevara; Leonidas Urbina; Magdiel González; Genna Chanelle Hayes
- Cinematography: Eduardo Rivas Servello
- Edited by: Will Pacheco; Antonio Bribiesca
- Music by: Blake Matthew
- Production companies: Luz Creativa; Desenlace Films; Rema Films
- Release date: March 9, 2019 (Guadalajara Film Festival)
- Countries: Venezuela; Mexico
- Language: Spanish

Infection (Spanish: Infección) is a 2019 horror thriller film written and directed by Flavio Pedota. It tells the story of a zombie apocalypse and contains elements of social satire. It is Venezuela's first zombie film. The film has received several awards and nominations. It is seen by many to contain anti-Chavismo commentary, and has been banned in Venezuela.

== Synopsis ==
As a new strain of rabies takes hold of Venezuelan capital Caracas, Dr. Adam Vargas and friend Johnny fight their way across the city to an international laboratory to create a cure, while also trying to find Adam's son who was staying in the countryside with his grandparents. They meet a doctor from Switzerland who has been sent to investigate the epidemic. It contains "post-epidemic interviews" during the end credits.

== Cast ==
- Rubén Guevara as Dr. Adam Vargas
- Leonidas Urbina as Johnny
- Magdiel González
- Genna Chanelle Hayes as Dr. Lucy Blake
- Luca de Lima as Miguel "Miguelito" Vargas
- Ananda Troconis
- Francis Rueda

== Production ==
The film was shot over 64 locations in Venezuela, including around Maracay. A report by Stephen Gibbs for CGTN America about the production described some difficulties that had been encountered in creating the film. For example, to ensure the cast and crew's safety, police were stationed around and on the sets; director Flavio Pedota said that the police were there "most of the time". The film also suffered from its low budget and the fact that it was being made during the time of shortages in Venezuela. Pedota has said that the crew managed to cheaply improvise many items of equipment and props, which they otherwise would have needed to import. He also gives the example of set-dressing during a scene that required abandoned cars on a main highway, saying that they found many such cars already at the location; Gibbs noted that making an apocalypse film in Venezuela gave the production "a pre-made film set".

Infection is an independent film with no support from Venezuelan film bodies. It was intended to be released in 2017, but began crowdfunding to complete its post-production in Mexico in 2018. In 2017 it had been shown at the Guadalajara Works in Progress festival, winning two prizes. It is Pedota's first feature film, though he has been working on films for several years.

Gibbs noted that the film was being made as the Zika epidemic reached Venezuela but before people knew it had spread to the country, calling the film "remarkably prescient".

The only non-Venezuelan actor in the film is the Australian Genna Chanelle, a friend of Pedota's whom he asked to be involved. She says that she was fearful of traveling to Venezuela for it.

== Release ==
In January 2020, as an act of defiance against the ban, the film was screened independently around Venezuela, in Mérida, Maracaibo, Barquisimeto and Caracas, including in the Alfredo Sadel Square.

== Response ==
Infection was nominated for the Best Ibero-American Film award at the 2019 Guadalajara International Film Festival, and won a Best Makeup and Best Actor award (for Rubén Guevara) at the 2019 Skiptown Playhouse International Film Festival. At Skiptown Playhouse it was also nominated for Wardrobe, Production Design, Special Effects, Sound Design, Cinematography and Director. It was also screened at the 2019 Raindance Film Festival.

For Variety, John Hopewell writes that the film has good production values and impressive shots of Caracas. He says it "can be read as social allegory". Javier Fernandez further writes that it "highlights a Latin American political problem, the destruction of a political and cultured class in a class struggle which spreads to the rest of Latin America". CinePremiere agrees that the film contains a social narrative, saying that being set "in a destroyed region, the film uses the zombie genre to talk about the socio-political context of Venezuela today".

Corina J Poore says that the film features "the fastest zombies [she's] ever seen", which are shown as breaking into houses and vandalizing abandoned cars, noting that this makes the film different. Poore comments on the social situation, too: she notes that in one shot a dead body lies beneath a sign reading 'An achievement of the Bolivarian Revolution', and the film contains anti-Maduro graffiti. Pedota, the writer and director of the film, has said that political, social, and health issues can be "interpreted in many different ways" but he "doesn't want to be the guy who tells you what the film is about, [he wants] people to explore it and have different interpretations".

The film was banned in Venezuela. Victor Drax of the Caracas Chronicles writes that horror is a genre often censored around the world, but it is popular in Venezuela, so the film has not been censored for its horrific content; he says that, instead, it has been censored because of its anti-Chavismo content. Talking to the magazine, Pedota maintained that "[he] filmed about our nation today. Wherever you point your camera at, that's what you see"; Drax concludes that "Chavismo doesn't care about censoring zombies and gore, it cares about censoring reality [...] reflected on the screen."

== See also ==
- Bolivarian Revolution in film
- List of banned films
