= In the Shadow of the Revolution =

2017 Venezuelan documentary film

- Film poster
- Directed by: J. Arturo Albarrán; Clifton Ross
- Distributed by: PM Press
- Release date: November 2017
- Running time: 51 minutes
- Countries: Venezuela; United States

In the Shadow of the Revolution is a 2017 documentary film directed by J. Arturo Albarrán and Clifton Ross, an American-Venezuelan collaboration. The film portrays a critical perspective of the Bolivarian Revolution from the left wing, offering an alternative point of view and a counternarrative explaining the corruption, inefficiency and authoritarianism of the Venezuelan government that created a deep economic crisis and political unrest. The documentary includes interviews of social movement activists, journalists, and academics.

== Interviews ==
The documentary's main protagonist is Rodzaida Marcus Vera, a musician, agroecologist, and indigenous-rights activist raised in El Valle parish, in Caracas, and whose mother was killed during the 1989 Caracazo riots. She studied sociology at the Central University of Venezuela, becoming involved with the peasant movement. Rodzaida tells that she supported the political movement led by Hugo Chávez in its beginnings, but also that she was concerned after his turn toward socialism in 2007.

Besides others, among the interviewees are historian and sociologist Margarita López Maya; labor journalist Damián Prat; National Assembly deputy, lawyer, and transgender activist Tamara Adrián; Guayana industry workers, including union leader and political prisoner Rubén González, and members of left-wing parties and organizations, including Socialist Tide and Red Flag. The documentary also interviews demonstrators, activists and participants of the 2017 Venezuelan protests.

== See also ==
- Bolivarian Revolution in film
- Caracas Chronicles
