= El ocaso del socialismo mágico =

2016 documentary film

- Film poster
- Directed by: Michele Calabresi
- Produced by: Cubo Films
- Starring: Froilán Barrios; Javier Biardeau; Douglas Bravo
- Release date: November 2016
- Running time: 78 minutes
- Country: Venezuela
- Language: Spanish

El ocaso del socialismo mágico (lit. 'The sunset of magical socialism') is a 2016 documentary film directed by Italian director Michele Calabresi. The film explores the effects of Venezuelan President Hugo Chávez's populism and his victory in the 1998 presidential elections, as well as his mistakes.

== Themes ==
Calabresi's intention was to show the achievements as well as the often forgotten and ignored mistakes of chavismo to the European left wing, who had romanticized chavismo and had been reluctant to admit the consequences of the growing militarism and authoritarianism in Venezuela. The director presents this through six chapters: leadership and anti-politics; the two left wings; opposition: from the coup to the vote; Chávez and the workers, participatory democracy; and the appearance of Hugo Chávez on the public scene, his arrival in power and the achievements and mistakes of his administration (Petrostate and magical socialism).

== Reception ==
Américo Martín in El Nuevo Herald described it as an "excellent" documentary, saying that the capacity was at its limit at the Trasnocho Cultural theatre in Caracas, where he watched the documentary, and that entrances ran out.

== Cast ==
- Froilán Barrios
- Javier Biardeau
- Douglas Bravo
- Manuel Caballero
- Orlando Chirino
- Rubén González (union leader)
- Freddy Guevara
- Carlos Hermoso
- Margarita López Maya
- Leopoldo López
- Teodoro Petkoff
- Mariclen Stelling
