= The Crossing (2020 film) =

2020 Colombian documentary film

- Film poster
- Directed by: Juliana Peñaranda-Loftus
- Written by: Graham Townsley
- Produced by: Hidden Village Films
- Release date: 2020
- Running time: 40 minutes
- Country: Colombia

The Crossing (Spanish: La Frontera) is a 2020 documentary film directed by Colombian filmmaker Juliana Peñaranda-Loftus. The documentary focuses on the Venezuelan refugee crisis, particularly at the Colombia-Venezuela border and in Cúcuta.

== Synopsis ==
The documentary starts with the 2019 humanitarian aid delivery attempt across the Colombia-Venezuela border and continues following the story of the Venezuelan refugee crisis, one of the largest migration crises in Latin America and the world, told by refugees and activists in Cúcuta, Colombia.

== Reception ==
The film was included the Vancouver International Film Festival, the St. Louis International Film Festival, the Bangkok International Film Festival and Holly Shorts 2020 official selection. The documentary was also considered as a candidate for the 94th Academy Awards for the Best Documentary (Short Subject) category.

== See also ==
- Bolivarian Revolution in film
