= Chavismo: The Plague of the 21st Century =

2018 documentary film directed by Gustavo Tovar Arroyo

- Spanish: Chavismo: la peste del siglo XXI
- Directed by: Gustavo Tovar-Arroyo
- Release date: 2018

Chavismo: The Plague of the 21st Century (Spanish: Chavismo: la peste del siglo XXI) is a 2018 documentary film directed by Gustavo Tovar-Arroyo. The film is an analysis of the social, political and economic causes of the rise of Hugo Chávez as president of Venezuela; his alleged abuse of power and the response of civil society, including the student movement; his political fall as well as the secrecy that surrounded his illness and the succession of Nicolás Maduro.

== Reception ==
The documentary film was awarded as the best documentary in the New York International Films Infest Festival.

In 2019, after a campaign in media outlets and social media by progovernment movements, the pro-government Supreme Tribunal of Justice of Venezuela, through a Caracas court, ordered the ban of the screening of the documentary at the Simón Bolívar University (USB) specifically, as well as at public universities and other public spaces in general, in response to the request of a prosecutor investigating it as an alleged hate crime or as inciting hate crimes, established in the Law against Hatred approved by the Constituent Assembly. The USB Teachers' Association responded by saying: "The regime's tribunal is a pretender and silences the freedom of speech once more in Venezuela. USB academics are affected because the university is forced to stop a screening. We expect domestic and international support." Tovar-Arroyo described the ban of his documentary as a "success without precedent", because now students would want to watch the documentary more.

== See also ==
- Bolivarian Revolution in film
