= Colateral =

2019 Venezuelan documentary

- Film poster
- Directed by: Lucrecia Cisneros
- Written by: Lucrecia Cisneros
- Produced by: Sariana Guerra; Carlos Carreño
- Cinematography: Elvira Prieto
- Music by: Luis Olavarría
- Distributed by: Embassy of France in Venezuela
- Release date: 2019
- Running time: 22 minutes
- Country: Venezuela
- Language: Spanish

Colateral (lit. 'Collateral') is a 2019 Venezuelan documentary film directed by journalist Lucrecia Cisneros. The documentary is about extrajudicial executions in Venezuela and their consequences on the affected families. The documentary was awarded several recognitions in film festivals, including in Venezuela the category of best documentary in the Short Film Contest of the National Film School and the International Festival El Grito.

== Production ==
Colateral's main theme of is the extrajudicial executions in Venezuela by state security forces, including the Special Action Forces (FAES). The project arose as a result of an initiative of Lucrecia Cisneros, who worked at Efecto Cocuyo and was studying her last semester at the Andrés Bello Catholic University (UCAB), majoring in social communication. The documentary was part of her undergraduate thesis. The production was made by several UCAB students, including Lucrecia Cisneros, Elvira Prieto, Carlos Carreño, Sariana Guerra, Andrés Gerlotti, Dayana Duarte and Luis Olavarría. The documentary explores the consequences of extrajudicial executions for the families and children affected, and presents the testimony of Zenaida Mejías, the mother of two children whose deaths are attributed to the action of security forces, one of which Zenaida was an eyewitness in her home. The testimony is accompanied by the analysis of a sociologist, a psychologist, a lawyer and a human rights defender.

== Reception ==
Colateral was included in the official selection of international film festivals. In Venezuela, it participated in the Documenta 2021 festival and in the international festivals El Grito and Maracay, as well as in the Festival Internacional de Cine Austral, in Argentina; the Festival de Cinema de Alter do Chão, in Brazil; the International Social Change Film Festival Chicago, in the United States; the Prague International Monthly Film Festival, in the Czech Republic; and the Africa Human Rights Film Festival, in South Africa.

In 2019 the documentary received the award for Best Documentary in the IV Short Film Competition of the National Film School (ENC), and in 2021 was awarded in the category of Best Documentary at the El Grito International Film Festival. It has also been the national winner of the international festival Les Tres, in Venezuela; the distribution award of the Daroca & Prison Film Festival in Spain, and the audience award of the Zeitimpuls ShortFilm Festival, in Austria.

== See also ==
- Bolivarian Revolution in film
