= A la calle =

2020 documentary film

- Film poster
- Directed by: Maxx Caicedo; Nelson G. Navarrete
- Produced by: Shawna Brakefield-Haase; Marcus Cheek; Maxx Caicedo; Nelson G. Navarrete
- Cinematography: David Mosquera
- Music by: Elik Alvarez
- Production companies: Priority Pictures; The Brakefield Company; Vitamin Productions
- Distributed by: HBO Max
- Release date: 2020
- Running time: 110 minutes
- Countries: Venezuela; United States

A la calle (lit. 'To The Streets') is a 2020 documentary film directed by Maxx Caicedo and Nelson G. Navarrete. The film focuses on the crisis in Venezuela, the 2017 Venezuelan protests and the Venezuelan presidential crisis.

== Synopsis ==
The documentary revolves about the efforts by Venezuelans to reestablish democracy in Venezuela from Nicolás Maduro, whose policies plunged the country into economic crisis and caused large nationwide demonstrations. The film also features opposition leader Leopoldo López, sentenced to 14 years in prison under charged for “inciting violence” after encouraging people to protest, and the rise to power of Juan Guaidó, president of the National Assembly of Venezuela. The film interviews Federica Ávila, a female medical student who supports her community where she can, and a man that must emigrate to support his family, as well as people who support President Hugo Chávez and Maduro.

== Reception ==
The documentary was nominated for the 2021 Greg Gund Memorial Standing Up Award of the Cleveland International Film Festival and was the winner of the 2021 Beyond the Screen Competition category of the DocAviv Film Festival. The documentary has also been screened at DOC NYC, Human Rights Watch Film Festival Toronto, Human Rights Watch Film Festival Amsterdam, Human Rights Watch Film Festival London, and the Miami Film Festival.

in a review of The New York Times, Nicolas Rapold describes the film as "granular portrait of struggle and survival", stating that "the grave damage done by Venezuela’s dictatorship becomes abundantly clear in the documentary". Critic Rob Aldam states in Backseat Mafia that "Using a network of undercover reporters and spending three years interviewing key opposition figures, A la calle documents a nation desperate for change", and that it "highlights the desire and determination of the ordinary people to take their country back." Amber Wilkinson reviewed in Eye For Film that "A little less protest footage and a little more cohesion in terms of the interview presentation would help the film's structure enormously as the dipping in and out of various stories means the timeline becomes tricky to follow in places", but that nevertheless "film brings home the panoply of problems facing Venezuela, while making no bones about the further detrimental impact Maduro is having on the situation". Pat Mullen concludes at POV Magazine that "A La Calle is yet another portrait of a nation teetering precariously upon the edge of democracy".

== See also ==
- Bolivarian Revolution in film
