= Nicolás Maduro =

President of Venezuela from 2013 to 2026

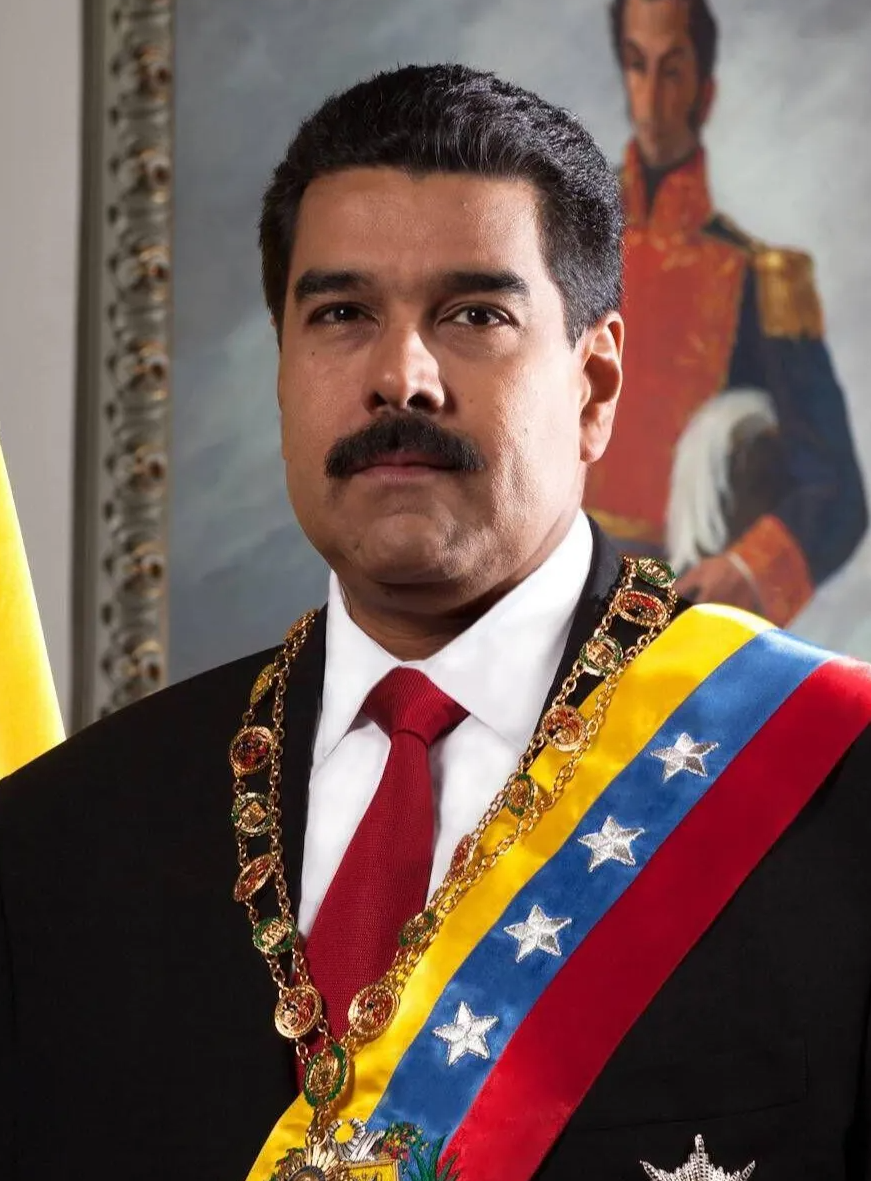
- Official portrait, 2013

53rd President of Venezuela
- Disputed
- Assumed office 19 April 2013 (Note: Acting: 5 March – 19 April 2013); Ousted since 3 January 2026 (Note: Following the 2026 United States intervention in Venezuela, in which Maduro was captured by and taken to the United States, Vice President Delcy Rodríguez was appointed acting president by order of the Supreme Tribunal of Justice. Both Rodríguez and Maduro have asserted that the latter remains the legal officeholder.) Disputed: Disputed with Juan Guaidó (23 January 2019 – 5 January 2023) (Note: Following the 2018 Venezuelan presidential election, the National Electoral Council published results with Maduro winning, but was disputed by the Venezuelan opposition citing election irregularities. Following Maduro's second inauguration, the National Assembly declared Maduro a usurper of the presidency, and Juan Guaido was sworn in as acting president a few days later.); Disputed with Edmundo González (10 January 2025–present)
- Vice President: See list: Himself (March–April 2013); Jorge Arreaza (2013–2016); Aristóbulo Istúriz (2016–2017); Tareck El Aissami (2017–2018); Delcy Rodríguez (2018–2026)
- Preceded by: Hugo Chávez
- Succeeded by: Delcy Rodríguez (acting)

President of the United Socialist Party of Venezuela
- Incumbent
- Assumed office 5 March 2013
- Vice President: Diosdado Cabello
- Preceded by: Hugo Chávez

Vice President of Venezuela
- In office 13 October 2012 – 19 April 2013
- President: Hugo Chávez; Himself (acting)
- Preceded by: Elías Jaua
- Succeeded by: Jorge Arreaza
Other offices held
Minister of Foreign Affairs
In office 9 August 2006 – 13 October 2012
President	Hugo Chávez
Preceded by	Alí Rodríguez Araque
Succeeded by	Elías Jaua
President of the National Assembly of Venezuela
In office 5 January 2005 – 7 August 2006
Preceded by	Francisco Ameliach
Succeeded by	Cilia Flores
Member of the National Assembly
In office 3 August 2000 – 7 August 2006
Constituency	Capital District
Diplomatic posts
Secretary General of the Non-Aligned Movement
In office 17 September 2016 – 25 October 2019
Preceded by	Hassan Rouhani
Succeeded by	Ilham Aliyev
President pro tempore of the Union of South American Nations
In office 23 April 2016 – 21 April 2017
Preceded by	Tabaré Vázquez
Succeeded by	Mauricio Macri

Personal details
- Born: Nicolás Maduro Moros; 23 November 1962 (age 63) Caracas, (Note: Although Nicolás Maduro's exact birthplace has been questioned on several occasions and high-ranking government officials have differed on its details, most sources agree that he was born in Caracas. See § Birthplace and nationality for more details.) Venezuela
- Party: PSUV (since 2007)
- Other political affiliations: Fifth Republic Movement (1997–2007); Revolutionary Bolivarian Movement-200 (1994–1997); Socialist League (1979–1990)
- Spouses: Adriana Guerra Angulo (div.); Cilia Flores (m. 2013)
- Children: Nicolás Maduro Guerra
- Maduro's voice Maduro on recovering the nation's petroleum industry (in Spanish); Recorded 3 March 2016

Nicolás Maduro Moros (Note: Spanish pronunciation: [nikoˈlas maˈðuɾo ˈmoɾos]) (born 23 November 1962) is a Venezuelan politician and former union leader who served as the 53rd president of Venezuela from 2013 until his capture in 2026 to face drug trafficking charges to which he pleaded not guilty. Originally elected democratically following the death of Hugo Chávez, he shifted toward authoritarian rule, with political analysts eventually classifying his government as a dictatorship in 2017. A member of the United Socialist Party of Venezuela (PSUV), he served as the vice president of Venezuela from 2012 to 2013 and as minister of foreign affairs from 2006 to 2012. Ideologically a Chavista, his developments to the ideology are called Madurismo.

Initially a bus driver, Maduro rose to become a trade union leader before being elected to the National Assembly in 2000. He was appointed to a number of positions under Chávez, serving as President of the National Assembly, Minister of Foreign Affairs, and vice president under Chávez. Maduro assumed the presidency after Chávez's death and won the 2013 special presidential election, becoming the 53rd president of Venezuela. He ruled Venezuela by decree after 2015 through powers granted to him by the ruling party legislature.

Maduro's popularity declined following shortages in Venezuela and a drop in living standards which led to a wave of protests in 2014 that escalated into daily marches nationwide and repression of dissent. An opposition-led National Assembly was elected in 2015, but Maduro maintained power through the Supreme Tribunal, the National Electoral Council (CNE) and the military. The Supreme Tribunal stripped the elected National Assembly of power and authority, resulting in a constitutional crisis and another wave of protests in 2017. In response to the protests, the Constituent Assembly of Venezuela was elected in 2017 under voting conditions that the opposition alleged were irregular.

In 2018, Maduro was reelected and sworn in. The president of the National Assembly, Juan Guaidó, was declared interim president by the opposition legislative body, starting a presidential crisis. In 2024, Maduro was reelected for a third term, though evidence showed that he lost the election by a wide margin. In 2026, he was seized in a U.S. military raid at his residence and transported to the U.S. to face drug trafficking charges. Delcy Rodríguez assumed power as acting president, though both she and Maduro insist that he is still the de jure president.

Maduro was accused of leading an authoritarian government, characterized by electoral fraud, human rights abuses, corruption, censorship and severe economic hardship. The United Nations and Human Rights Watch have alleged that under Maduro's administration, thousands of people died in extrajudicial killings and seven million Venezuelans fled the country due to economic collapse.

== Early and personal life ==
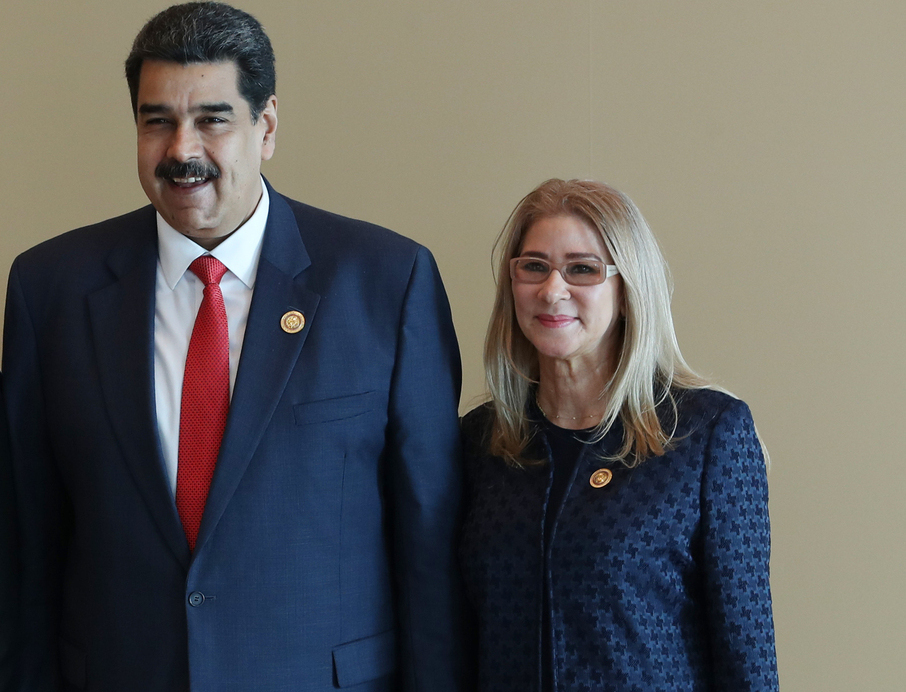
Maduro and his wife, Cilia Flores, in 2019

Nicolás Maduro Moros was born on 23 November 1962 in Caracas, into a working-class family. His father, Nicolás Maduro García, was a prominent trade union leader and a "militant dreamer" of the Movimiento Electoral del Pueblo (MEP); he died in a motor vehicle accident on 22 April 1989. His mother, Teresa de Jesús Moros, was born in Cúcuta, a Colombian city on the border with Venezuela. Maduro was raised in Calle 14, a street in Los Jardines, El Valle, a working-class neighborhood on the western outskirts of Caracas. The only male of four siblings, he has three sisters: María Teresa, Josefina, and Anita.

Maduro was raised Catholic. In 2012, it was reported by The New York Times that he was a follower of Indian Hindu guru Sathya Sai Baba and previously visited the guru in India in 2005. In a 2013 interview, Maduro stated that his grandparents were Jewish, from a Sephardic background, and converted to Catholicism in Venezuela.

Maduro has been married twice. His first marriage was to Adriana Guerra Angulo, with whom he had his only son, Nicolás Maduro Guerra, also known as "Nicolasito", who was appointed to several senior government posts, Chief of the Presidency's Special Inspectors Body, head of the National Film School, and is a deputy to the National Assembly of Venezuela.

On 15 July 2013, he married Cilia Flores, a lawyer and politician who replaced Maduro as president of the National Assembly in August 2006, when he resigned to become Minister of Foreign Affairs, becoming the first woman to serve as president of the National Assembly. The two had been in a romantic relationship since the 1990s when Flores was Hugo Chávez's lawyer following the 1992 Venezuelan coup d'état attempts and were married months after Maduro became president.

While they have no children together, Maduro has three step-children from his wife's first marriage to Walter Ramón Gavidia: Walter Jacob, Yoswel, and Yosser.

Maduro is a fan of John Lennon's music and his political activism for peace and against war. Maduro has said that he was inspired by the music and counterculture of the 1960s and 70s, mentioning Robert Plant and Led Zeppelin.

== Early career ==
=== Education and union work ===
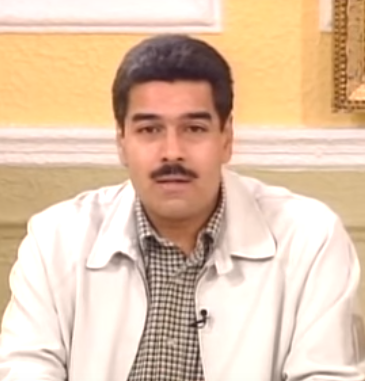
Maduro as member of the National Constituent Assembly in 1999

Maduro attended the Liceo José Ávalos public high school in El Valle, where he was introduced to politics as a member of the school's student union. However, according to school records, Maduro did not graduate.

For many years, Maduro worked as a bus driver for the Caracas Metro. He founded an unofficial trade union at the company, which had banned unions at that time. He was also employed as a bodyguard for José Vicente Rangel during Rangel's unsuccessful 1983 presidential campaign.

At the age of 24, Maduro was living in Havana after being sent by the Socialist League to attend a one-year course at the Escuela Nacional de Cuadros Julio Antonio Mella, a political training center directed by the Union of Young Communists. According to Carlos Peñaloza Zambrano, during Maduro's time in Cuba he was instructed by Pedro Miret Prieto, a senior member of the Politburo of the Communist Party of Cuba who was close to Fidel Castro.

=== MBR–200 ===
According to Carlos Peñaloza Zambrano, Maduro was allegedly tasked by the Castro government to serve as a "mole" working for the Cuba's Dirección de Inteligencia to approach Hugo Chávez, who was experiencing a burgeoning military career.

In the early 1990s, he joined MBR-200 and campaigned for the release of Chávez when he was jailed for his role in the 1992 Venezuelan coup d'état attempts. In the late 1990s, Maduro was instrumental in founding the Movement of the Fifth Republic, which supported Chávez in his run for president in 1998.

=== National Assembly ===
Maduro was elected on the MVR ticket to the Venezuelan Chamber of Deputies in 1998, to the National Constituent Assembly in 1999, and finally to the National Assembly in 2000, at all times representing the Capital District. He was elected as president of the National Assembly of Venezuela, a role he held from 2005 until 2006.

== Foreign affairs ministry (2006–2012) ==
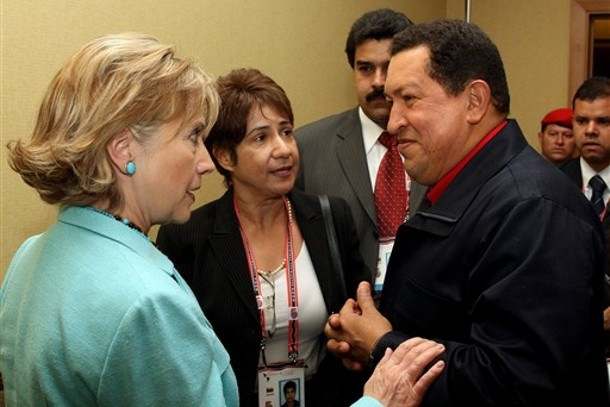
Maduro and Hugo Chávez with U.S. Secretary of State Hillary Clinton at the Summit of the Americas on 19 April 2009

Maduro was appointed Minister of Foreign Affairs in 2006, and served under Chávez in that position until being appointed Vice President of Venezuela in October 2012, after the presidential elections. According to BBC Mundo, during Maduro's tenure as foreign minister, "he was considered a key player in pushing the foreign policy of his country beyond Latin American borders to approach almost any government that rivaled the United States."

Venezuela's foreign policy stances during his term included ending relations with Taiwan in favor of the People's Republic of China, support for Libya under Muammar Gaddafi, breaking off diplomatic ties with Israel during the 2008–09 Gaza War, recognizing and establishing diplomatic relations with the State of Palestine, a turnaround in relations with Colombia in 2008 and again in 2010, recognizing Abkhazia and South Ossetia as independent states, and support for Bashar al-Assad during the Syrian Civil War.

Temir Porras, a 2019 visiting professor at Paris Institute of Political Studies who was Maduro's chief of staff during his tenure as foreign minister, said that in the early days of Chavismo, Maduro was considered "pragmatic" and a "very skilled politician" who was "good at negotiating and bargaining". According to Rory Carroll, Maduro did not speak any foreign languages while serving as the Minister of Foreign Affairs.

=== 2006 detention in New York ===
In New York City in September 2006, while attempting to travel back to Venezuela via Miami, Maduro was briefly detained by United States Department of Homeland Security officers at the John F. Kennedy International Airport for around 90 minutes, after paying for three airline tickets in cash. Both Maduro and President Hugo Chávez were in New York City attending the 61st session of the UN General Assembly, where President Chávez called U.S. President George W. Bush "the devil" during his speech.

The incident began when Maduro tried to pick up an item that had been screened at a security checkpoint at the airport, and security personnel told Maduro that he was prohibited from doing so. Maduro later identified himself as a diplomat from the Venezuelan government, but officials still escorted him to a room to conduct secondary screening. At one point, authorities ordered Maduro and other Venezuelan officials to spread their arms and legs and be frisked, but Maduro and others forcefully refused. His diplomatic passport and ticket were retained for a time but eventually returned.

Speaking at the Venezuelan mission to the UN after his release, Maduro said his detention by the US authorities was illegal and he filed a complaint at the United Nations. US and UN officials called the incident "regrettable" but said Maduro had been identified for "secondary screening". Homeland Security spokesman Russ Knocke claimed that Maduro was not mistreated, saying that there was no evidence of abnormalities during the screening process. Maduro said the incident prevented him from traveling home on the same day.

When he was informed of the incident, President Chávez said Maduro's detention was retaliation for his own speech at the UN General Assembly and stated that the authorities detained Maduro over his links to the Venezuelan failed coup in 1992, a charge that President Chávez denied.

== Vice presidency (2012–2013) ==
My firm opinion, as clear as the full moon – irrevocable, absolute, total – is ... that you elect Nicolas Maduro as President. I ask this of you from my heart. He is one of the young leaders with the greatest ability to continue, if I cannot.

— Hugo Chávez during a nationwide TV address (cadena nacional) (8 December 2012)

Prior to his appointment to the vice presidency, Maduro had been chosen by Chávez in 2011 to succeed him in the presidency if he were to die from cancer. This choice was made due to Maduro's loyalty to Chávez and because of his good relations with other chavistas such as Elías Jaua, former minister Jesse Chacón and Jorge Rodríguez. Bolivarian officials predicted that following Chávez's death, Maduro would have political difficulties and that Venezuela would experience instability.

On 13 October 2012, Chávez appointed Maduro Vice President of Venezuela, shortly after Chavez' victory in that month's presidential election. On 8 December 2012, Chávez announced that his recurring cancer had returned and that he would be returning to Cuba for emergency surgery and further medical treatment. Chávez said that, should his condition worsen and a new presidential election be called to replace him, Venezuelans should vote for Maduro to succeed him. This was the first time that Chávez named a potential successor to his movement, as well as the first time he publicly acknowledged the possibility of his death.

Chávez's endorsement of Maduro sidelined Diosdado Cabello, a former vice president and powerful Socialist Party official with ties to the armed forces, who had been widely considered a top candidate to be Chávez's successor. After Maduro was endorsed by Chávez, Cabello "immediately pledged loyalty" to both men.

=== Interim president ===
Upon the death of Hugo Chávez on 5 March 2013, Maduro assumed the powers and responsibilities of the president. He appointed Jorge Arreaza to take his place as vice president. Since Chávez died within the first four years of his term, the Constitution of Venezuela stated that a presidential election had to be held within 30 days of his death. Maduro was unanimously chosen as the Socialist Party's candidate in the election. When he assumed temporary power, opposition leaders argued that Maduro violated articles 229, 231, and 233 of the Venezuelan Constitution, by assuming power over the president of the National Assembly.

== Presidency (2013–2026) ==
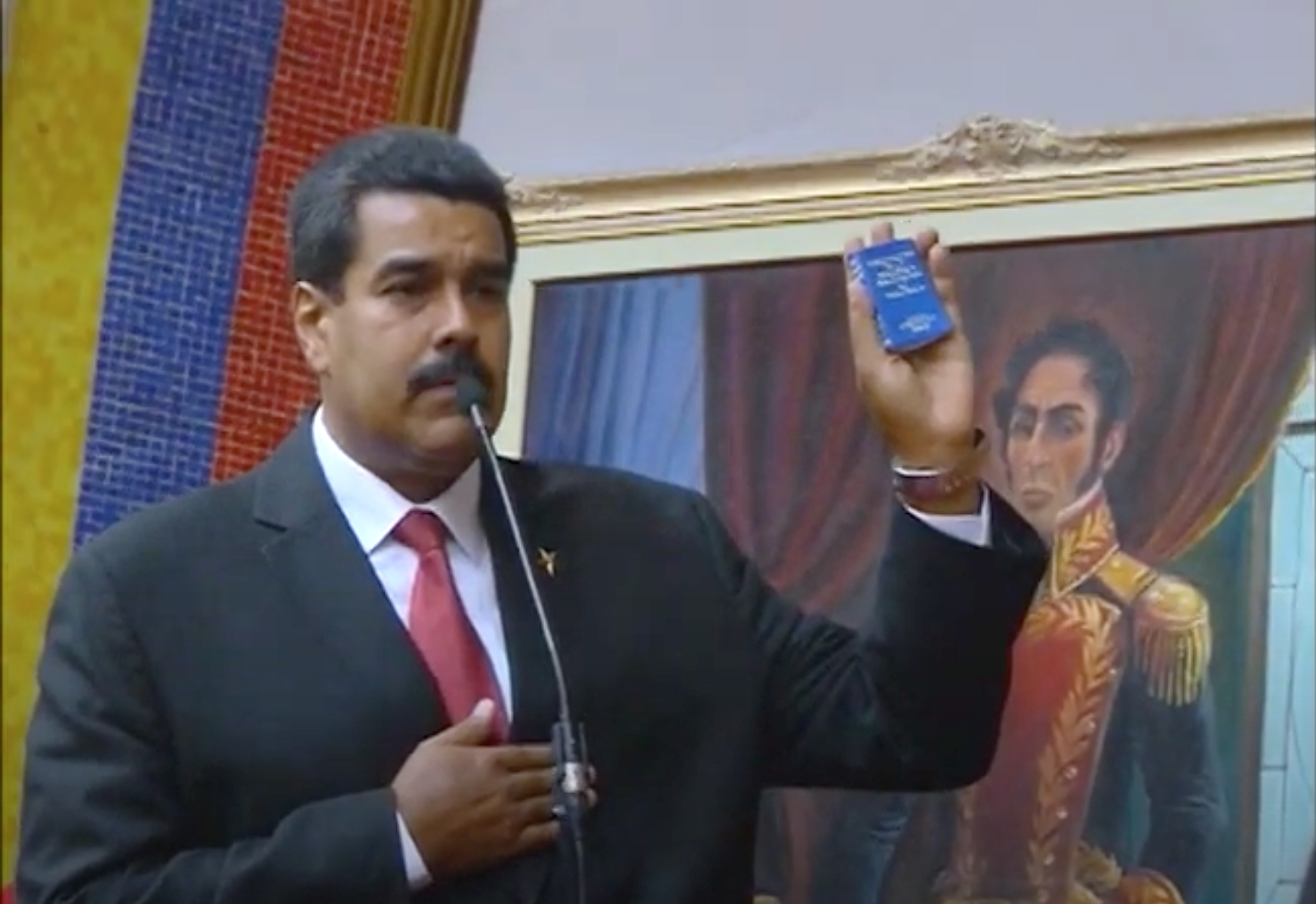
Maduro taking the oath of office as president of Venezuela on 19 April 2013

The succession to the presidency of Maduro in 2013, according to Corrales and Penfold, was due to multiple mechanisms established by Maduro's predecessor, Chávez. Initially, oil prices were high enough for Maduro to maintain necessary spending for support, specifically with the military. Foreign ties that were established by Chávez were also used by Maduro as he applied skills that he had learned while serving as a foreign minister. Finally, the PSUV and government institutions aligned behind Maduro, and "the regime used the institutions of repression and autocracy, also created under Chávez, to become more repressive vis-à-vis the opposition".

In April 2013, Maduro was elected president, narrowly defeating opposition candidate Henrique Capriles with just 1.5% of the vote separating the two. Capriles demanded a recount, refusing to recognize the outcome as valid. Maduro was inaugurated as president on 19 April, after the election commission had promised a full audit of the election results. In October 2013, he announced the creation of a new agency, the Vice Ministry of Supreme Happiness, to coordinate social programmes.

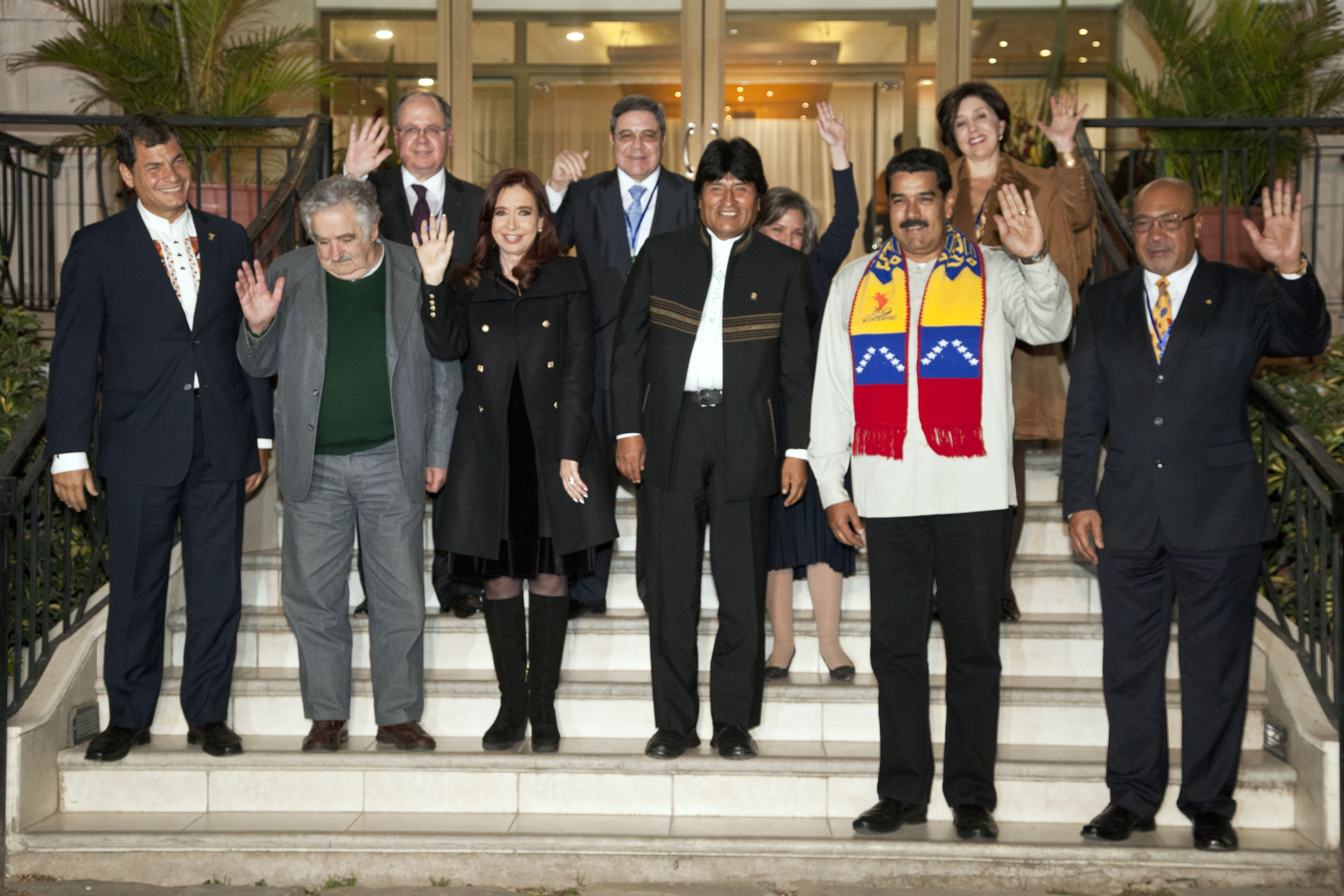
President Maduro among other Latin American leaders participating in a 2013 UNASUR summit

Opposition leaders in Venezuela delivered a May 2016 petition to the National Electoral Council (CNE) calling for a recall referendum, with the populace to vote on whether to remove Maduro from office. On 5 July 2016, the Venezuelan intelligence service detained five opposition activists involved with the recall referendum, with two other activists of the same party, Popular Will, also arrested. After delays in verification of the signatures, protestors alleged the government was intentionally delaying the process. The government, in response, argued the protestors were part of a plot to topple Maduro. On 1 August 2016, the CNE announced that enough signatures had been validated for the recall process to continue. While opposition leaders pushed for the recall to be held before the end of 2016, allowing a new presidential election to take place, the government vowed a recall would not occur until 2017, ensuring the current vice president would potentially come to power.

In May 2017, Maduro proposed the 2017 Venezuelan Constituent Assembly election, which was later held on 30 July 2017 despite wide international condemnation. The United States sanctioned Maduro following the election, labeling him as a "dictator", preventing him from entering the United States. Other nations, such as China, Russia, and Cuba offered their support to Maduro and the Constituent Assembly elections. The presidential elections, whose original electoral date was scheduled for December 2018, was subsequently pulled ahead to 22 April before being pushed back to 20 May. Analysts described the poll as a show election, with the elections having the lowest voter turnout in the country's democratic era.

Beginning six months after being elected, Maduro was given the power to rule by decree by the pre-2015 Venezuelan legislature (from 19 November 2013 to 19 November 2014, 15 March 2015 to 31 December 2015) and later by the Supreme Tribunal (since 15 January 2016) to address the ongoing economic crisis in Venezuela, with strong condemnation by the Venezuelan opposition claiming that the legislature's power had been usurped by the court. His presidency has coincided with a decline in Venezuela's socioeconomic status, with crime, inflation, poverty and hunger increasing; analysts have attributed Venezuela's decline to both Chávez and Maduro's economic policies, while Maduro has blamed speculation and economic warfare waged by his political opponents.

A 2018 Amnesty International report "accused Nicolas Maduro's government of committing some of the worst human rights violations in Venezuela's history". The report found the violence was carried out especially in Venezuela's poor neighborhoods, and included "8,292 extrajudicial executions carried out between 2015 and 2017". In one year, 22% of homicides (4,667) were committed by security forces. Amnesty International's Erika Guevara-Rosas said, "The government of President Maduro should guarantee the right to life, instead of taking the lives of the country's young people."

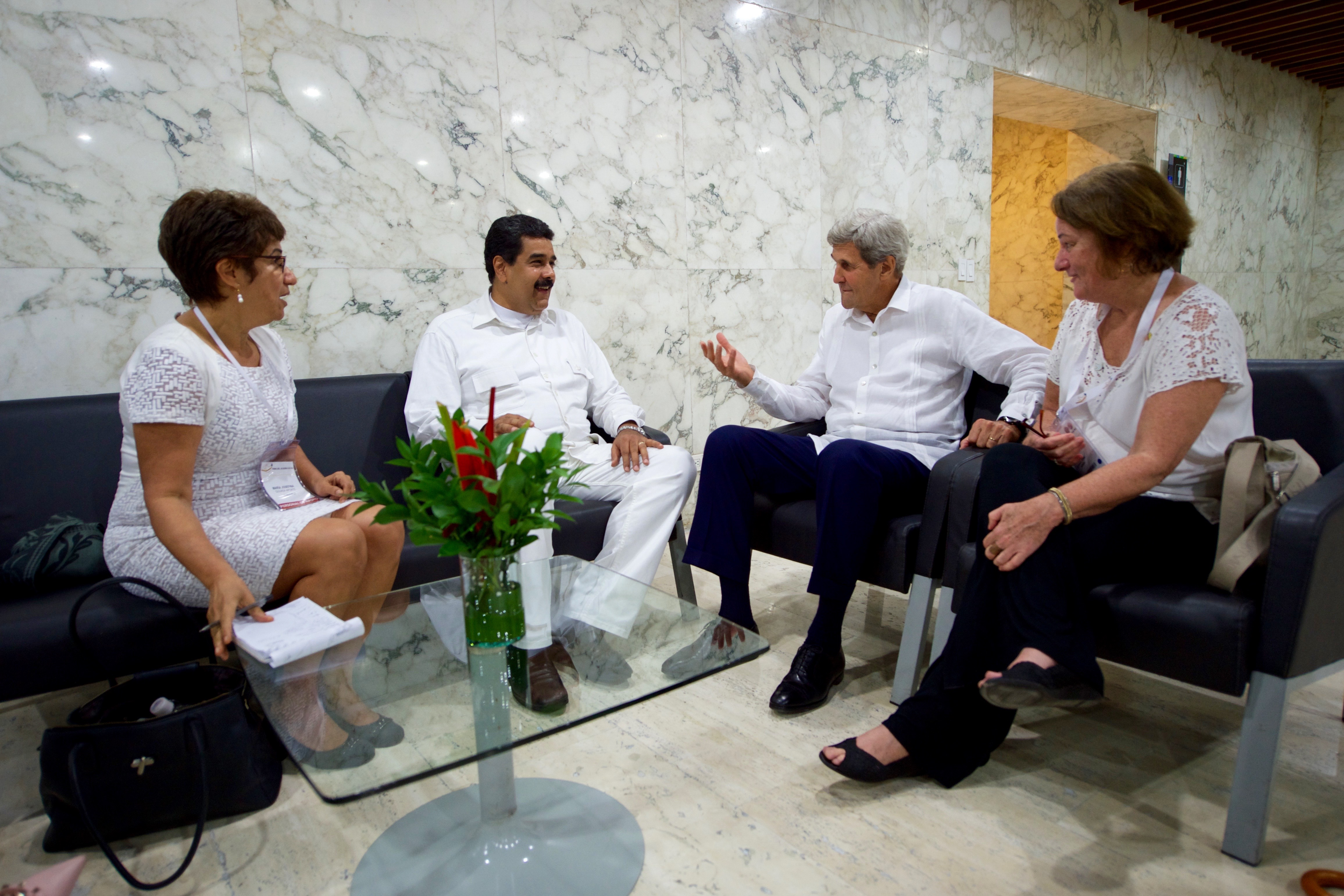
Maduro meeting with U.S. Secretary of State John Kerry on 26 September 2016

During the later years of Maduro's presidency, pro-government police and military forces launched the "Liberation of the People Operation", which they stated targeted street gangs and non-state paramilitary formations which they alleged had taken control of poor neighbourhoods. The operations reportedly resulted in thousands of arrests and an estimated 9,000 deaths, with the Venezuelan opposition claiming that the operations are actually a state instrument of repression. The UN released a report condemning the violent methods of the operation. Although the Venezuelan government's ombudsman, Tarek William Saab has admitted that his office received dozens of reports of "police excesses", he defended the need for the operations and stated that his office would be working alongside the police and military "to safeguard human rights". The Venezuelan Foreign Ministry has criticised the UN's report, calling it "neither objective, nor impartial" and listed what it believed were a total of 60 errors in the report.

In 2019, Porras, Maduro's former chief of staff, said that Maduro "delivered practically nothing in terms of public policy, in terms of direction" during his first term because, in Porras' opinion, "he does not have a clear vision for the country. He is very much focused on consolidating his power among his own peers in Chavismo and much less on exercising or implementing a strategic vision for the country." Following increased international sanctions during the Venezuelan crisis in 2019, the Maduro government abandoned socialist policies established by Chávez, such as price and currency controls, which resulted in the country seeing a rebound from economic decline. The Economist wrote that Venezuela had also obtained "extra money from selling gold (both from illegal mines and from its reserves) and narcotics".

On 3 May 2020, Venezuelan security forces prevented an attempt to overthrow Maduro by armed Venezuelan dissidents. The attempt was organised by an American private security company, Silvercorp USA, headed by Jordan Goudreau and the men were trained in Colombia. Goudreau claimed the operation had involved 60 troops, including two former US special forces members. The Venezuelan government claimed the United States and its Drug Enforcement Administration (DEA) were responsible for the operation and had support from Colombia. Juan Guaidó denied involvement in the operation. Goudreau claimed that Guaidó and two political advisers had signed a contract with him for US$213 million in October 2019. Eight of the attackers were killed, and thirteen more, including two Americans, were captured.

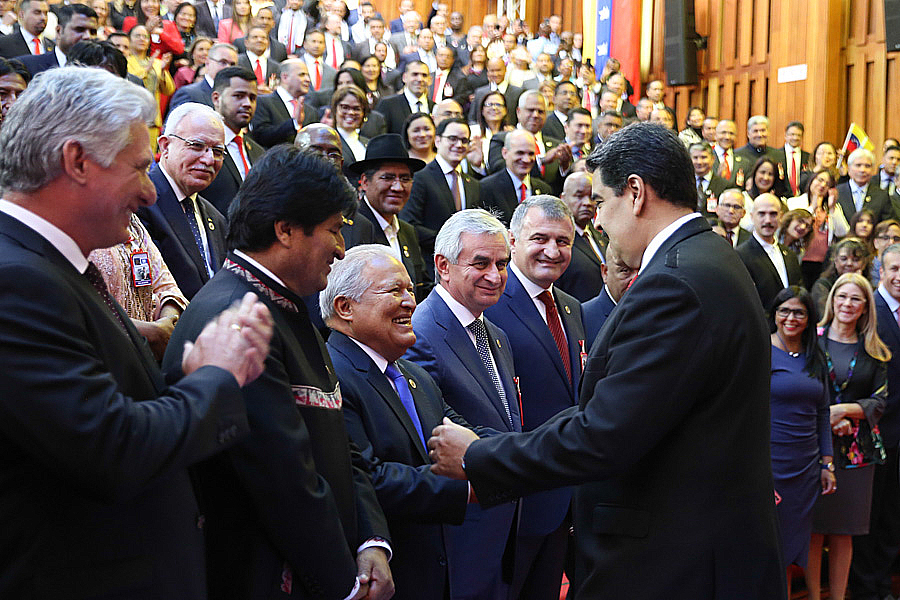
Foreign leaders greet Maduro at Maduro's second inauguration on 10 January 2019

In October 2020, Maduro was indicted by a US federal court, accused of narcoterrorism and conspiracy to import cocaine to the United States. In August 2025, the United States Department of Justice raised the reward for the arrest of Maduro to US$50 million. The U.S. began a series of escalating actions including the 10 December 2025 seizure of the oil tanker Skipper in international waters, off the Venezuelan coast.

In October 2025, it was reported that the United States allegedly attempted to capture Maduro through a covert operation involving an effort to recruit his personal pilot, General Bitner Villegas. According to the Associated Press, U.S. Homeland Security agent Edwin Lopez met Villegas in the Dominican Republic and offered him wealth in exchange for diverting Maduro's aircraft to a location where U.S. authorities could legalize his arrest, who faced narco-terrorism charges. Over the following 16 months, Lopez maintained encrypted contact with the pilot, but the plan failed when Villegas refused to cooperate. The plot originated from an April 2024 tip about Maduro's planes, which were later seized in Santo Domingo for sanctions violations. In 2025, after Lopez's final attempts to persuade Villegas collapsed, allies of the Venezuelan opposition publicized the agent's contact with the pilot, briefly sparking speculation about Villegas's fate before he reappeared publicly affirming his loyalty to Maduro.

On 24 November 2025, the Trump administration officially labeled him and his government allies as members of a foreign terrorist group.

On 3 January 2026, during the United States strikes in Venezuela, Donald Trump said Maduro had been captured by the United States, along with his wife. Legal experts believe it is likely a violation of the U.N. Charter's article 2(4) which requires respect for other countries' sovereignty and prohibits the use of military force without U.N. authorization, except for self-defense. Although Maduro was de facto removed from power, according to the Venezuelan government and interim president Delcy Rodríguez, he is still the de jure president of Venezuela.

=== International relations ===
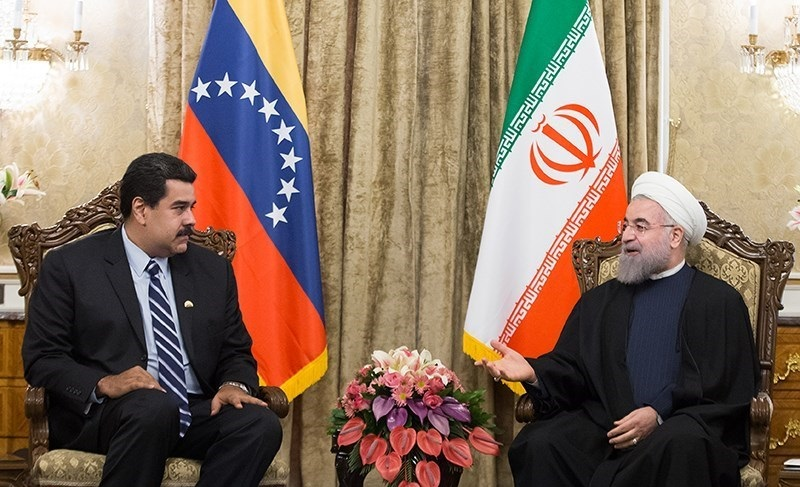
Maduro meeting with Iranian president Hassan Rouhani in 2015

On 6 March 2014, marking the 1 year anniversary of Hugo Chávez's death, Maduro announced on live television that he was breaking diplomatic and commercial relations with Panama after the country's president Ricardo Martinelli expressed support for the demonstrators during the protests that began on 12 February and called on the OAS to investigate. Relations were later restored in July 2014, after Vice President Jorge Arreaza attended the inauguration of President Juan Carlos Varela.

On 11 August 2017, US President Donald Trump said that he is "not going to rule out a military option" to confront the government of Maduro. On 23 January 2019, Maduro announced that Venezuela was breaking ties with the United States following Trump's announcement of recognizing Juan Guaidó, the Venezuelan opposition leader, as the interim President of Venezuela.

Another diplomatic crisis with Panama occurred in 2018, after the Panamanian government imposed sanctions on Maduro and several key officials of the Bolivarian government. Venezuela responded by imposing reciprocal sanctions on Panamanian companies and as well as prominent Panamanian officials, including President Juan Carlos Varela. The diplomatic crisis ended on 26 April 2018 when President Maduro announced that he had called President Varela and agreed to the return of the ambassadors and the return of air communication between both countries.

On 14 January 2019, days after Brazil recognised Venezuelan opposition leader Juan Guaidó as the country's interim president, Maduro called Brazilian President Jair Bolsonaro "a Hitler of the modern era".

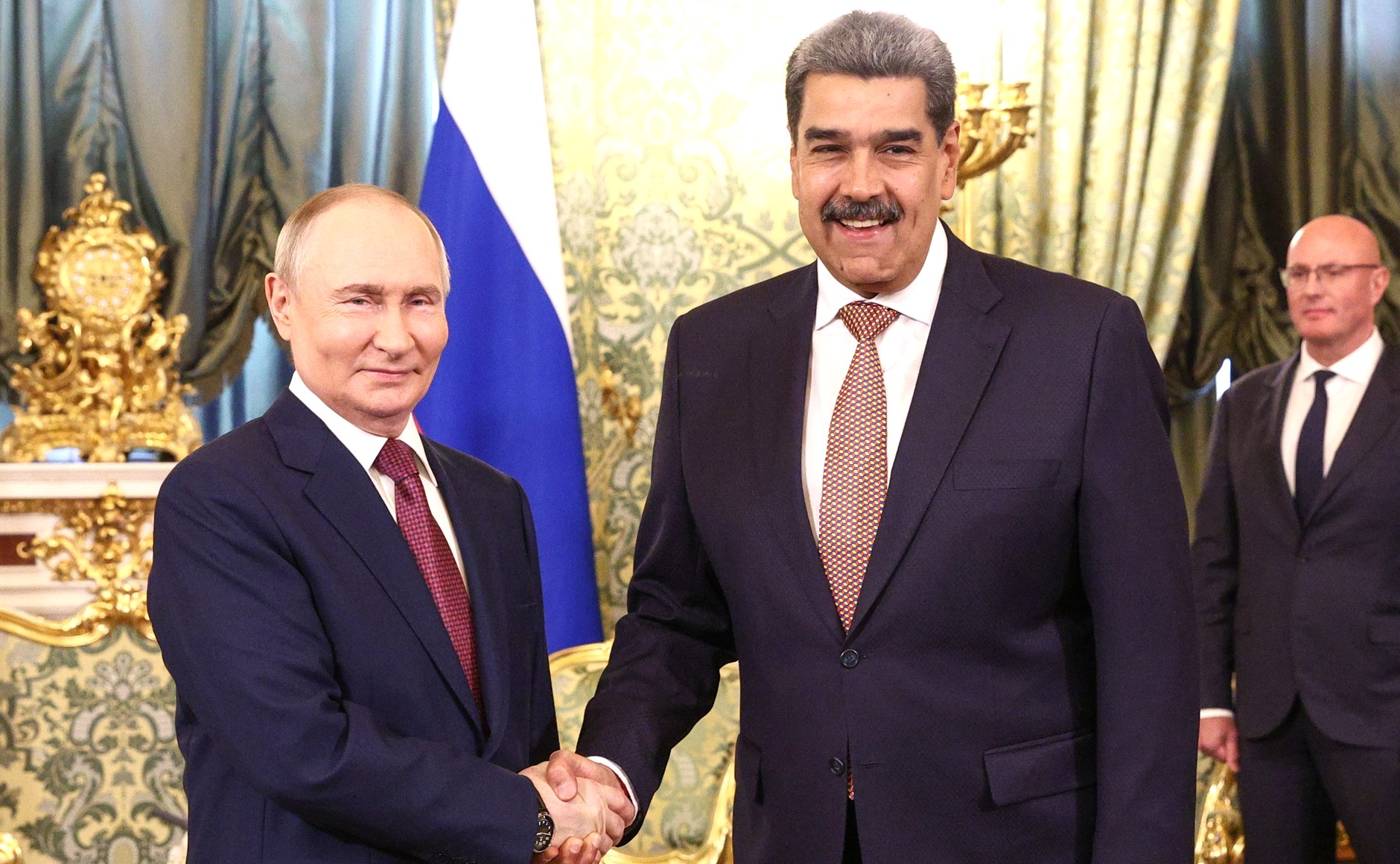
Maduro with Russian President Vladimir Putin during the Victory Day celebrations in Moscow on 7 May 2025

Maduro has a strategic partnership with Russian leader Vladimir Putin. After Russia invaded Ukraine in February 2022, Maduro discussed increasing cooperation with Russia. Due to the raised oil prices resulting from the conflict, diplomatic conversations were initiated between Maduro and US officials, suggesting the possibility of easing of US sanctions on Venezuela and improved relations between the two countries. Late in the Biden administration, the U.S. Department of the Treasury's Office of Foreign Assets Control (OFAC) lifted sanctions in October 2023 for six-months to allow limited trade with the U.S. to resume.

During the 2022 United Nations Climate Change Conference in November, multiple world leaders interacted with Maduro, including President of France Emmanuel Macron, Prime Minister of Portugal António Costa and American John Kerry, with President Macron addressing Maduro as "president" and stating "I would be happy if we could talk to each other for longer to engage in useful bilateral work for the region." Days later on 27 November, the United States eased sanctions on Venezuela and allowed Chevron Corporation to temporarily work with the Venezuelan government.

Maduro made an official state visit to Saudi Arabia in June 2023. He also visited China in September 2023, requesting China's support for Venezuela to join the economic bloc BRICS and saying he wanted China's investment in Latin America and the Caribbean to increase. Brazil's president Lula da Silva supported Maduro's request to join BRICS. During the visit, Maduro also signed an agreement that included the training of Venezuelan astronauts, expressing his wish to send Venezuelans to the Moon.

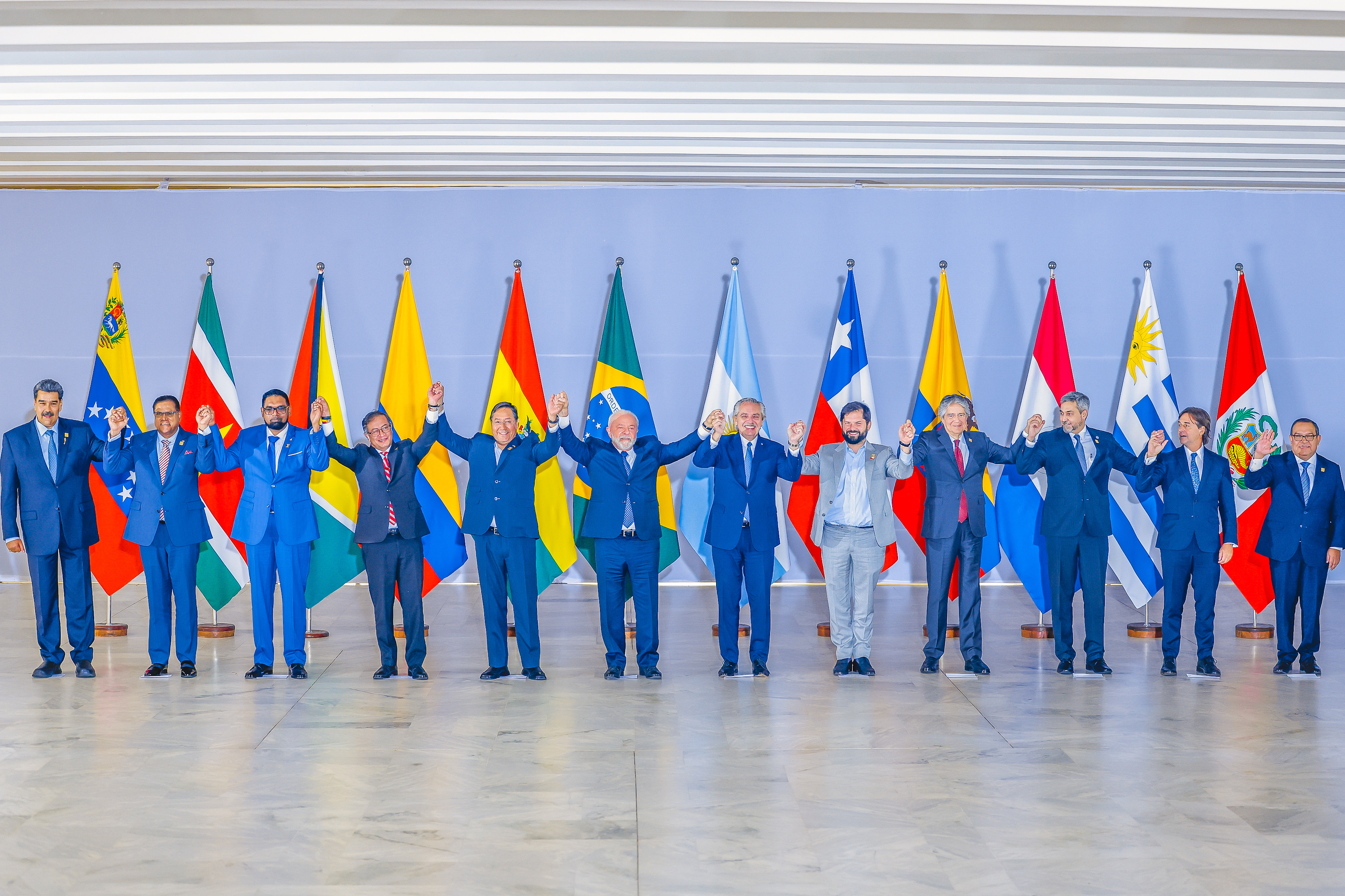
Maduro at the 2023 South American summit

In the Israeli–Palestinian conflict, Maduro has frequently supported the Palestinian cause in international forums, declaring that "Jesus Christ was a young Palestinian unjustly crucified by the Spanish Empire". On 7 November 2023, he condemned Israel's actions in the Gaza Strip during the Gaza war and accused Israel of committing genocide against Palestinians in Gaza.

Maduro promoted a consultative referendum in Venezuela to support Venezuela's claim to the Essequibo region, which is disputed with, and controlled by, neighboring Guyana. The referendum took place on 3 December 2023, and a large majority (nearly 100%) voted in favour of Venezuela's claims, though it had a low turnout. The referendum was one of the contributing factors for the Guyana–Venezuela crisis.

In June 2025, Maduro condemned Israeli attacks on Iran, describing it as a "criminal assault" that "violates international law and the United Nations Charter", and accused France, Germany, Britain and the US of supporting "the 21st-century Hitler" against the "noble and peaceful Iranian people".

=== Assassination attempts ===
On 4 August 2018, while giving a speech while commemorating the 81st anniversary of the Bolivarian National Guard and addressing soldiers in front of the Centro Simón Bolívar Towers and Palacio de Justicia de Caracas, two drones detonated explosives near Avenida Bolívar, Caracas. The Venezuelan government claims the event was a targeted attempt to assassinate Maduro, accusing Venezuelan National Assembly deputy Juan Requesens of being the attempted assassin. However, the cause and intention of the explosions is debated. Others have suggested the incident was a false flag operation designed by the government to justify repression of opposition in Venezuela.

In May 2020, a failed dissident maritime infiltration known as Operation Gideon attempted to enter Venezuela by sea from eastern Colombia. Organized by Jordan Goudreau, a former U.S. Green Beret and CEO of the private security firm Silvercorp USA, the operation aimed to take control of tactical airfields, overthrow the government, and forcefully capture or eliminate Maduro. The infiltration boats were intercepted by Venezuelan intelligence forces at Macuto and Chuao, resulting in at least six deaths and the apprehension of over 90 individuals, including two U.S. citizens and former Special Forces soldiers, Airan Berry and Luke Denman. Maduro subsequently accused the governments of Colombia and the United States of orchestrating and financing the raid as a targeted terrorist operation.

In September 2024, the Venezuelan police captured and arrested three Americans, two Spaniards, and a Czech national carrying sniper rifles and other munitions to allegedly assassinate Maduro. In a public statement, the Minister of Interior, Justice and Peace, Diosdado Cabello held the CIA and Spanish intelligence responsible for the coup attempt, calling it 'not surprising'. The minister shared that they had arrested yet another US military active-duty member, Wilber Joseph Castañeda, with evidence from his cell phone linking him to terrorist attacks during the 2024 Venezuelan presidential election.

In late 2025, public debate regarding covert U.S. intervention intensified following reporting on historical executive parameters and contemporary intelligence directives. National security analysts and declassified documents published by the National Security Archive highlighted a renewed legal focus on the region, noting that while public executive orders have historically banned targeted foreign assassinations, evolving designations regarding international narco-terrorism networks had fueled widespread speculation from the Maduro administration regarding authorized CIA clandestine operations and covert action strategies.

== United States capture and trial (2026–present) ==
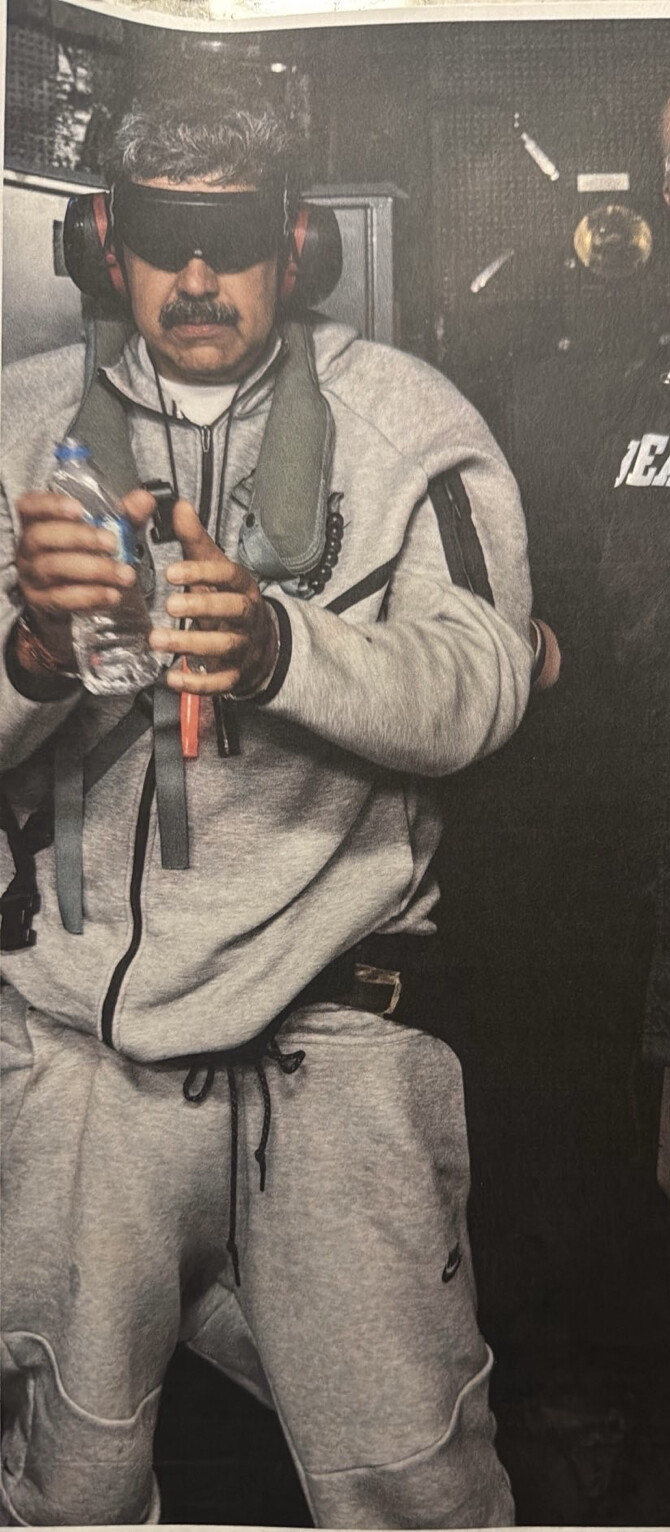
Maduro following his capture, on board USS Iwo Jima

In the pre-dawn hours of 3 January 2026, the United States launched a military operation in Venezuela. A large-scale strike was reportedly carried out, with Donald Trump, the president of the United States, announcing around 04:20 EST (05:20 VET) that Maduro and his wife were captured and had been flown out of the country; Secretary of State Marco Rubio said that Maduro was to stand trial on criminal charges in the United States. Senator Mike Lee stated that Rubio "anticipate[d] no further action in Venezuela now that Maduro is in U.S. custody". The apprehension was carried out by the US Army's Delta Force. Venezuelan vice president Delcy Rodríguez said she did not know Maduro's whereabouts and demanded "proof of life".

The couple was initially transferred to USS Iwo Jima and subsequently flown to the United States, arriving at Stewart Air National Guard Base in Upstate New York on the same day. Maduro is being held at the Metropolitan Detention Center, Brooklyn.

Maduro was taken into federal custody to face the 2020 narco-terrorism charges in the Southern District of New York, with an initial court appearance scheduled for the following week. U.S. attorney general Pam Bondi confirmed that both Maduro and his wife would face charges including narco-terrorism conspiracy and cocaine importation conspiracy in a superseding indictment.

On 5 January 2026, Maduro and his wife were both arraigned, with each entering not guilty pleas to numerous drug trafficking charges. During the hearing, U.S. District Judge Alvin Hellerstein ordered Maduro to remain held until at least a March 17 hearing. This court appearance was delayed to 26 March 2026. He remained in solitary confinement to protect him from possible attacks by Venezuelan inmates. Maduro and his wife appeared in court on March 26, after which they returned to jail in Brooklyn.

As of July 2026, their trial has been scheduled for 1 June 2027. On 28 October 2026, judge Hellerstein died and the case was reassigned to judge Analisa Torres.

== Controversies ==
=== Disputed presidency ===
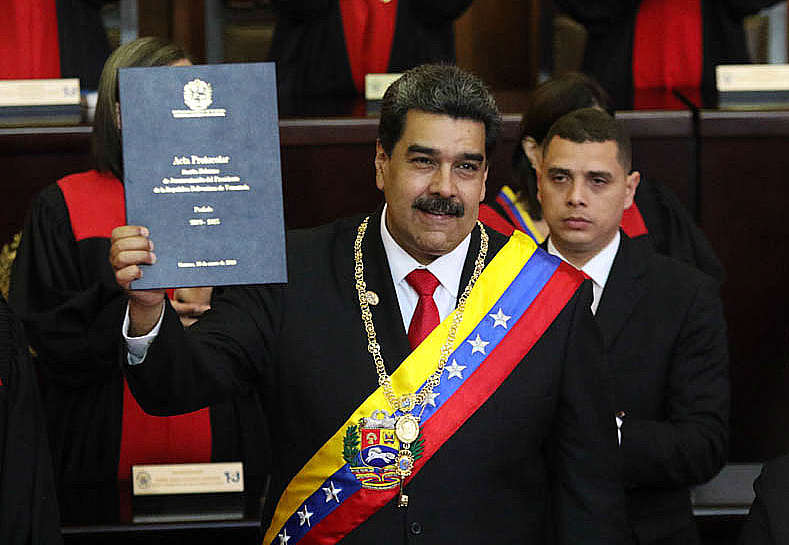
Maduro in January 2019 at the Supreme Tribunal of Justice building

With widespread condemnation, President Maduro was sworn in on 10 January 2019. Minutes afterwards, the Organization of American States (OAS) approved a resolution declaring his presidency illegitimate and calling for new elections. The National Assembly invoked a state of emergency, and some nations removed their embassies from Venezuela, with Colombia, and the US saying Maduro was converting Venezuela into a dictatorship. The president of the National Assembly, Juan Guaidó, was declared interim president on 23 January 2019; the US, Canada, Brazil and several Latin American countries supported Guaidó as interim president the same day; Russia, China, and Cuba supported Maduro. The Supreme Tribunal rejected the National Assembly decisions, while the Supreme Tribunal of Justice of Venezuela in exile welcomed Guaidó as interim president. The United States Department of State stated that Maduro had used unconstitutional means and a "sham electoral system" to maintain an unlawful presidency not recognized by Venezuela's neighbors.

Maduro disputed Guaidó's claim and broke off diplomatic ties with several nations who recognized Guaidó's claim. Maduro's government stated that the crisis was a coup led by the US to topple him and control the country's oil reserves."

=== Dictatorship accusations ===
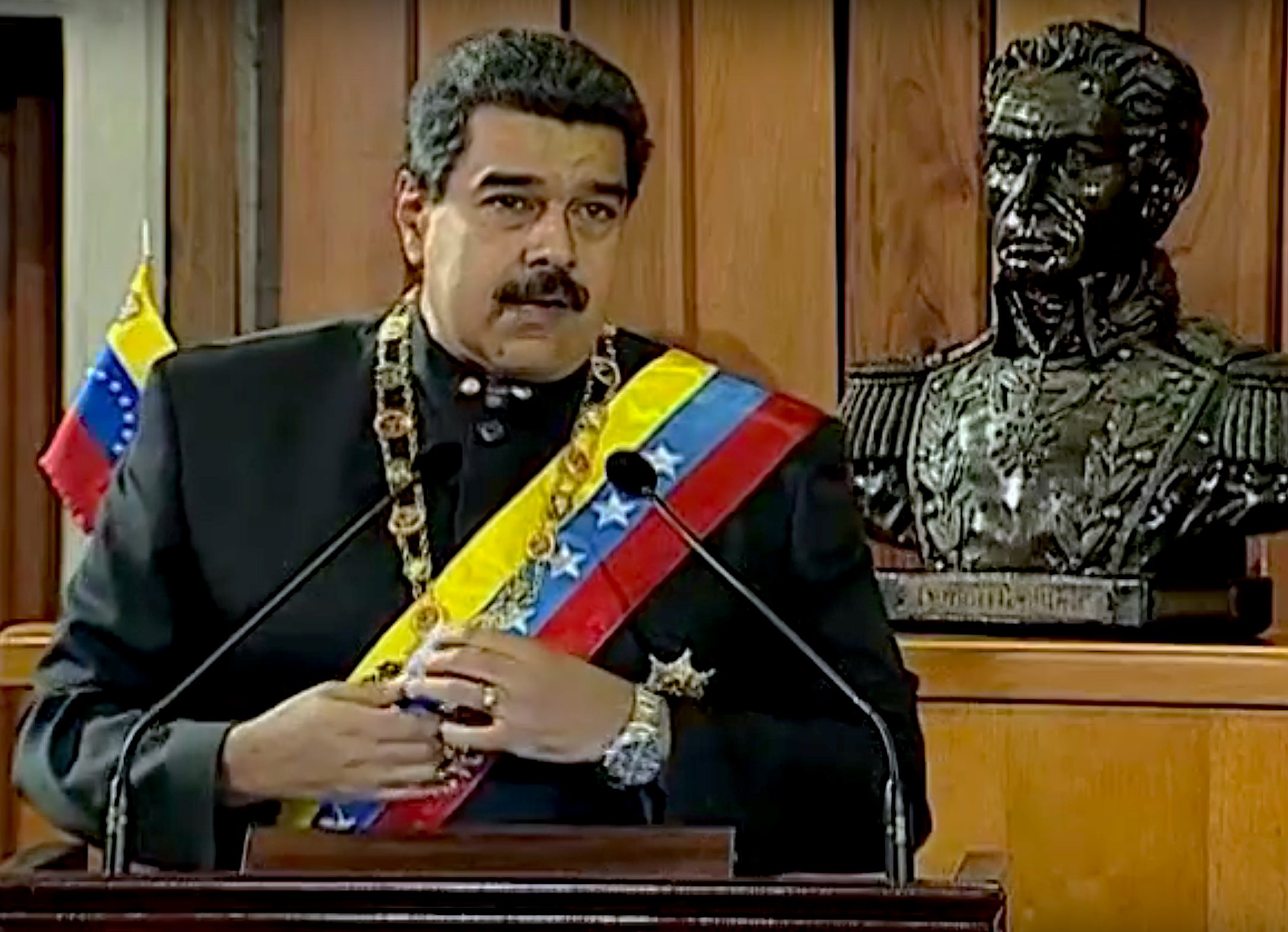
Maduro speaking at the Supreme Tribunal of Justice in February 2017

Maduro has been accused of authoritarian leadership since he took office in 2013. After the opposition won the 2015 parliamentary elections, the lame duck National Assembly—consisting of pro-Maduro Bolivarian officials—filled the Supreme Tribunal of Justice with Maduro allies; the New York Times reported that Venezuela was "moving closer to one-man rule".

In 2016, the Supreme Tribunal refused to acknowledge the democratically elected National Assembly's attempts to recall Maduro, and the words dictator and authoritarianism began to appear: Foreign Affairs wrote of a "full-on dictatorship", Javier Corrales wrote in Americas Quarterly that Venezuela was "transition[ing] to a full dictatorship", and OAS General Secretary Luis Almagro said Maduro was becoming a dictator. After election officials aligned with the government blocked an attempt to summon a recall referendum against Maduro, Venezuelan political analysts cited in The Guardian warned of authoritarianism and a dictatorship.

The Supreme Tribunal took over the legislative powers of the National Assembly in March, provoking the 2017 Venezuelan constitutional crisis. With the 2017 Constituent National Assembly poised to declare itself the governing body of Venezuela, the United States Department of the Treasury sanctioned President Maduro, labeled him a dictator, and prevented him from entering the US. Chilean president Sebastián Piñera labeled Maduro a dictator. Human Rights Watch described the process that led to the National Assembly being taken over, and Venezuela a dictatorship, and said the "Venezuelan government is tightening its stranglehold on the country's basic institutions of democracy at a terrifying speed." The Financial Times discussed "international censure of Nicolás Maduro, Venezuela's thuggish president". The Chicago Tribune wrote that "the Trump administration should harbor no illusions about Maduro, who appears bent on assuming the mantle of dictator." Vox Media published an opinion titled "How Venezuela went from a rich democracy to a dictatorship on the brink of collapse."

The Economist Intelligence Unit stated that during Maduro's presidency, the country's democracy deteriorated further, with the 2017 report downgrading Venezuela from a hybrid regime to an authoritarian regime, the lowest category, with an index of 3.87 (the second lowest in Latin America, along with Cuba), reflecting "Venezuela's continued slide towards dictatorship" as the government has side-lined the opposition-dominated National Assembly, jailed or disenfranchised leading opposition politicians and violently suppressed opposition protests.

Venezuelan presidential elections were held prematurely in May 2018; the New York Times printed a piece headlining the word dictator, "Critics Say He Can't Beat a Dictator. This Venezuelan Thinks He Can". Miguel Angel Latouche, a political science professor at Central University of Venezuela wrote a piece entitled, "Venezuela is now a dictatorship", and CNN reported that US Republicans were using the term Venezuelan dictator to describe a Democratic candidate. Roger Noriega wrote in the Miami Herald that a "lawless regime" and "narcodictatorship" headed by Maduro, Tareck El Aissami and Diosdado Cabello had driven "Venezuela to the brink of collapse".

The 10 January 2019 second inauguration of Nicolás Maduro was widely condemned and led to commentary that Maduro had consolidated power and become a dictator, from the Times, the Council on Foreign Relations, German newspaper Frankfurter Allgemeine Zeitung, and the Economist.

Canada's prime minister Justin Trudeau labeled Maduro an "illegitimate dictator" responsible for "terrible oppression" and the humanitarian crisis. Presidents Mauricio Macri of Argentina and Jair Bolsonaro of Brazil condemned what they called Maduro's dictatorship.

Univisión announcer Jorge Ramos described his detention following a live interview of Maduro, saying that if Maduro does not release the seized video of the interview, "he is behaving exactly like a dictator". U.S. Senator Bernie Sanders stated "of course Maduro is a dictator". Reporter Kenneth Rapoza wrote an opinion piece for Forbes with the title, "Basically everyone now knows Venezuela is a dictatorship."

=== Birthplace and nationality ===
To be elected as President of the Republic it is required to be Venezuelan by birth, to not hold another nationality, to be over thirty years old, to not be a member of the clergy, to not be subject to a court conviction and to meet the other requirements established in this Constitution

— Article 227 of the Constitution of Venezuela

Maduro's birthplace and nationality have been questioned, with some placing doubt he can legally hold the presidency, given that Article 227 of the constitution states that "To be elected as president of the Republic it is required to be Venezuelan by birth, to not hold another nationality, to be over thirty years old, to not be a member of the clergy, to not be subject to a court conviction and to meet the other requirements in this Constitution."

By 2014, official declarations by the Venezuela government shared four different birthplaces of Maduro. Tachira state's governor José Vielma Mora assured that Maduro was born in El Palotal sector of San Antonio del Táchira and had relatives in the towns of Capacho and Rubio. The opposition deputy Abelardo Díaz reviewed the civil registry of El Valle, as well as the civil registry referenced by Vielma Mora, without finding any proof or documentation that could confirm Maduro's birthplace. In June 2013, two months after assuming the presidency, Maduro claimed in a press conference in Rome that he was born in Caracas, in Los Chaguaramos, in San Pedro Parish. During an interview with a Spanish journalist, also in June 2013, Elías Jaua claimed that Maduro was born in El Valle parish, in the Libertador Municipality of Caracas.

In October 2013, Tibisay Lucena, head of the National Electoral Council, assured in the Globovisión TV show Vladimir a la 1 that Maduro was born in La Candelaria Parish in Caracas, showing copies of the registry presentation book of all the newborns the day when allegedly Maduro was born. In April 2016 during a cadena nacional, Maduro changed his birthplace narrative once more, saying that he was born in Los Chaguaramos, specifically in Valle Abajo, adding that he was baptized in the San Pedro church.

In 2016, a group of Venezuelans asked the National Assembly to investigate whether Maduro was Colombian in an open letter addressed to the National Assembly president Henry Ramos Allup that justified the request by the "reasonable doubts there are around the true origins of Maduro, because, to date, he has refused to show his birth certificate". The 62 petitioners, including former ambassador Diego Arria, businessman Marcel Granier and opposition former military, assuring that according to the Colombian constitution Maduro is "Colombian by birth" for being "the son of a Colombian mother and for having resided" in the neighboring country "during his childhood".

The same year several former members of the Electoral Council sent an open letter to Tibisay Lucena requesting to "exhibit publicly, in a printed media of national circulation the documents that certify the strict compliance with Articles 41 and 227 of the Constitution of the Bolivarian Republic of Venezuela, that is to say, the birth certificate and the Certificate of Venezuelan Nationality by Birth of Nicolás Maduro Moros in order to verify if he is Venezuelan by birth and without another nationality". The document mentions that the current president of the CNE incurs in "a serious error, and even an irresponsibility, when she affirms that Maduro's nationality 'is not a motto of the National Electoral Council'" and the signatories also refer to the four different moments in which different politicians have awarded four different places of birth as official. Diario Las Américas claimed to have access to the birth inscriptions of Teresa de Jesús Moros, Maduro's mother, and of José Mario Moros, his uncle, both registered in the parish church of San Antonio of Cúcuta, Colombia.

Opposition deputies have assured that the birth certificate of Maduro must say that he is the son of a Colombian mother, which would represent proof that confirms that the president has double nationality and that he cannot hold any office under Article 41 of the constitution. Deputy Dennis Fernández Solórzano has headed a special commission that investigates the origins of the president and has declared that "Maduro's mother is a Colombian citizen" and that the Venezuelan head of State would also be Colombian. The researcher, historian and former deputy Walter Márquez declared months after the presidential elections that Maduro's mother was born in Colombia and not in Rubio, Táchira. Márquez has also declared that Maduro "was born in Bogotá, according to the verbal testimonies of people who knew him as a child in Colombia and the documentary research we did" and that "there are more than 10 witnesses that corroborate this information, five of them live in Bogotá".

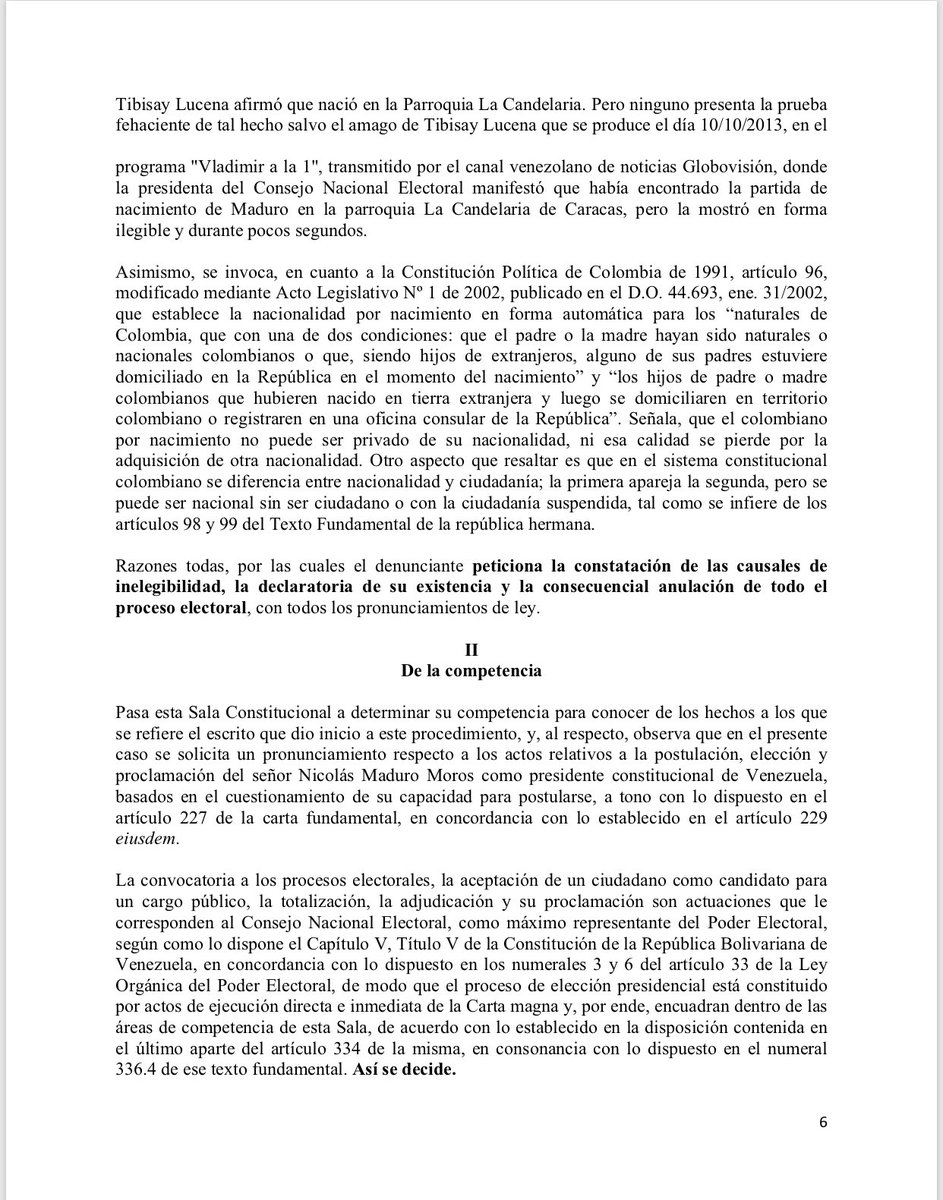
Sentence of the Supreme Tribunal in exile that annuls the 2013 presidential elections and requests the presidency and the CNE to send a certified copy of the president's birth certificate, as well as the resignation from his Colombian nationality

On 28 October 2016, the Supreme Tribunal of Justice issued a ruling stating that according to incontrovertible evidence, it had absolute certainty that Maduro was born in Caracas, in the parish of La Candelaria, known then as the Libertador Department of the Federal District, on 23 November 1962. The ruling does not reproduce Maduro's birth certificate. Instead, it quotes a communique signed on 8 June by the Colombian vice-minister of foreign affairs Patti Londoño Jaramillo: "No related information was found, nor civil registry of birth, nor citizenship card that allows [us] to infer that president Nicolás Maduro Moros is a Colombian national". The Supreme Court warned the deputies and the Venezuelans that "sowing doubts about the origins of the president" may "lead to the corresponding criminal, civil, administrative and, if applicable, disciplinary consequences" for "attack against the State".

On 11 January 2018, the Supreme Tribunal of Justice of Venezuela in exile decreed the nullity of the 2013 presidential elections after lawyer Enrique Aristeguieta Gramcko presented evidence about the presumed non-existence of ineligibility conditions of Maduro to be elected and to hold the office of the presidency. Aristeguieta argued in the appeal that, under Article 96, Section B, of the Political Constitution of Colombia, Nicolás Maduro Moros, even in the unproven case of having been born in Venezuela, is "Colombian by birth" because he is the son of a Colombian mother and by having resided in that territory during his youth. The Constitutional Chamber admitted the demand and requested the presidency and the Electoral Council to send a certified copy of the president's birth certificate, in addition to his resignation from Colombian nationality. In March 2018 former Colombian president Andrés Pastrana made reference to the baptism certificate of Maduro's mother, noting that the disclosed document reiterates the Colombian origin of the mother of the president and that therefore Maduro has Colombian citizenship.

=== Conspiracy theories ===
Maduro continued the practice of his predecessor, Hugo Chávez, of denouncing alleged conspiracies against him or his government; in a period of fifteen months following his election, dozens of conspiracies, some supposedly linked to assassination and coup attempts, were reported by Maduro's government. In this same period, the number of attempted coups claimed by the Venezuelan government outnumbered all attempted and executed coups occurring worldwide in the same period. In TV program La Hojilla, Mario Silva, a TV personality of the main state-run channel Venezolana de Televisión, stated in March 2015 that Maduro had received about 13 million psychological attacks.

Observers say that Maduro uses such conspiracy theories as a strategy to distract Venezuelans from the root causes of problems facing his government. According to American news publication Foreign Policy, Maduro's predecessor, Hugo Chávez, "relied on his considerable populist charm, conspiratorial rhetoric, and his prodigious talent for crafting excuses" to avoid backlash from troubles Venezuela was facing, with Foreign Policy further stating that for Maduro, "the appeal of reworking the magic that once saved his mentor is obvious". Andrés Cañizales, a researcher at the Andrés Bello Catholic University, said that as a result of the lack of reliable mainstream news broadcasting, most Venezuelans stay informed via social networking services, and fake news and internet hoaxes have a higher impact in Venezuela than in other countries.

In early 2015, the Maduro government accused the United States of attempting to overthrow him. The Venezuelan government performed elaborate actions to respond to such alleged attempts and to convince the public that its claims were true. The reactions included the arrest of Antonio Ledezma in February 2015, placing travel restrictions on American tourists and holding military marches and public exercises "for the first time in Venezuela's democratic history". After the United States ordered sanctions to be placed on seven Venezuelan officials for human rights violations, Maduro used anti-U.S. rhetoric to bump up his approval ratings. However, according to Venezuelan political scientist Isabella Picón, only about 15% of Venezuelans believed in the alleged coup attempt accusations at the time.

In 2016, Maduro again claimed that the United States was attempting to assist the opposition with a coup attempt. On 12 January 2016, the Secretary General of the Organization of American States (OAS), Luis Almagro, threatened to invoke the Inter-American Democratic Charter, an instrument used to defend democracy in the Americas when threatened, when opposition National Assembly members were barred from taking their seats by the Maduro-aligned Supreme Court. Human rights organizations such as Human Rights Watch, and the Human Rights Foundation called for the OAS to invoke the Democratic Charter. After more controversies and pursuing a recall on Maduro, on 2 May 2016, opposition members of the National Assembly met with OAS officials to ask for the body to implement the Democratic Charter. Two days later on 4 May, the Maduro government called for a meeting the next day with the OAS, with Venezuelan Foreign Minister Delcy Rodríguez stating that the United States and the OAS were attempting to overthrow Maduro. On 17 May 2016 in a national speech, Maduro called OAS Secretary General Luis Almagro "a traitor" and stated that he worked for the CIA. Almagro sent a letter rebuking Maduro, and refuting the claim.

The Trump administration described Maduro's government as a "dictatorship". When meeting with Latin American leaders during the seventy-second session of the UN General Assembly, US President Donald Trump discussed possible United States military intervention in Venezuela, an offer rejected by those present. Maduro's son, Nicolás Maduro Guerra, stated during the 5th Constituent Assembly of Venezuela session that if the United States were to attack Venezuela, "the rifles would arrive in New York, Mr. Trump, we would arrive and take the White House".

Michael Shifter, president of the Inter-American Dialogue think tank, said "a military action of the United States against Venezuela would be contrary to the movements of the Trump administration to retire troops from Syria or Afghanistan." John Bolton declared that "all options are on the table" but has also said that "our objective is a peaceful transfer of power".

=== Censorship ===
During Maduro's first tenure, between 2013 and 2018, 115 media outlets were shut down, including 41 print outlets, 65 radio outlets and 9 television channels. During the first seven months of 2019, the Press and Society Institute of Venezuela found at least 350 cases of violations of freedom of expression.

Since the beginning of the presidential crisis, Venezuela has been exposed to frequent "information blackouts", periods without access to the Internet or other news services during important political events. Since January, the National Assembly, and Guaido's speeches are regularly disrupted, television channels and radio programs have been censored, and many journalists were illegally detained. The Venezuelan press workers union reported that in 2019, 40 journalists had been arrested unlawfully as of 12 March. As of June 2019, journalists have been denied access to seven sessions of the National Assembly by the National Guard.

The state controls most Venezuelan television channels, and information unfavorable to the government is not covered completely. Newspapers and magazines are scarce, as most cannot afford paper to print. The underfunded web infrastructure has led to slow Internet connection speeds. The information blackouts have promoted the creation of underground news coverage that is usually broadcast through social media and instant message services like WhatsApp. The dependence of Venezuelans on social media has also promoted the spread of disinformation and pro-Maduro propaganda.

Venezuela's rank on the World Press Freedom Index of Reporters Without Borders has dropped 42 places since 2013. The Inter-American Commission on Human Rights (IACHR) has made a call to the Maduro administration to reestablish TV and radio channels that have been closed, cease the restrictions on Internet access, and protect the rights of journalists.

=== Human rights ===
"Let's overcome the differences, the conflict we had."

"The doors of the Miraflores palace are open...so that we can talk about the differences we have, the conflict that arose and overcome it,"

— Maduro said on 23 April 2024 in an event held at the Miraflores presidential palace, with Karim Khan (the prosecutor of the International Criminal Court), who is investigating Venezuela for possible human right crimes, standing next to him. In the event Maduro said he agreed to allow the reopening of the office of the United Nations High Commissioner for Human Rights (OHCHR). The UN Human Rights Office was expelled from Venezuela in February after it had expressed concern over the detention of Rocío San Miguel.

A Board of Independent Experts designated by the Organization of American States (OAS) published a 400-page report in 2018 that alleged that crimes against humanity have been committed in Venezuela during Maduro's presidency. The Board concluded that Maduro could be "responsible for dozens of murders, thousands of extra-judicial executions, more than 12,000 cases of arbitrary detentions, more than 290 cases of torture, attacks against the judiciary and a 'state-sanctioned humanitarian crisis' affecting hundreds of thousands of people".

In February 2018, the International Criminal Court (ICC) announced that it would open preliminary probes into the alleged crimes against humanity performed by Venezuelan authorities. On 27 September 2018, six states parties to the Rome Statute: Argentina, Canada, Colombia, Chile, Paraguay and Peru, referred the situation in Venezuela since 12 February 2014 to the ICC, requesting the Prosecutor Fatou Bensouda to initiate an investigation on crimes against humanity allegedly committed in the territory. The following day, the Presidency assigned the situation to Pre-Trial Chamber I.

In March 2019 The Wall Street Journal reported in an article entitled "Maduro loses grip on Venezuela's poor, a vital source of his power" that barrios are turning against Maduro and that "many blame government brutality for the shift". Foro Penal said that 50 people—mostly in barrios—had been killed by security forces in only the first two months of the year, and 653 had been arrested for protesting or speaking against the government. Cofavic, a victims' rights group, estimated "3,717 extrajudicial killings in the past two years, mostly of suspected criminals in barrios".

In April 2019, the US Department of State alleged that Venezuela, "led by Nicolas Maduro, has consistently violated the human rights and dignity of its citizens" and "driven a once prosperous nation into economic ruin with his authoritarian rule" and that "Maduro's thugs have engaged in extra-judicial killings and torture, taken political prisoners, and severely restricted freedom of speech, all in a brutal effort to retain power." The State Department report highlighted abuse by the nation's security forces, including a number of deaths, the suspicious death of opposition politician Fernando Albán Salazar, the detention of Roberto Marrero, and repression of demonstrators during Venezuelan protests which left at least 40 dead in 2019.

The third and last report of the Office of the United Nations High Commissioner for Human Rights addressed extrajudicial executions, torture, enforced disappearances, and other rights violations allegedly committed by Venezuelan security forces in recent years. The High Commissioner Michelle Bachelet expressed her concerns for the "shockingly high" number of extrajudicial killings and urged for the dissolution of the FAES. According to the report, 1569 cases of executions as consequence as a result of "resistance to authority" were registered by the Venezuelan authorities from 1 January to 19 March. Other 52 deaths that occurred during 2019 protests have been attributed to colectivos. The report also details how the Venezuelan government has "aimed at neutralising, repressing and criminalising political opponents and people critical of the government" since 2016.

A report by the human rights advocacy group Human Rights Watch reported in September 2019 that the poor communities in Venezuela no longer in support of Maduro's government have witnessed arbitrary arrests and extrajudicial executions at the hands of Venezuelan police unit. The Venezuelan government has repeatedly declared that the victims were armed criminals who had died during "confrontations". Still, several witnesses or families of victims have challenged these claims, and in many cases, victims were last seen alive in police custody. Although Venezuelan authorities told the United Nations Office of the High Commissioner for Human Rights (OHCHR) that five FAES agents were convicted on charges including attempted murder for crimes committed in 2018 and that 388 agents were under investigation for crimes committed between 2017 and 2019, the OHCHR also reported that "[i]nstitutions responsible for the protection of human rights, such as the Attorney General's Office, the courts and the Ombudsperson, usually do not conduct prompt, effective, thorough, independent, impartial and transparent investigations into human rights violations and other crimes committed by State actors, bring perpetrators to justice, and protect victims and witnesses." The government made three times more observations than the number of recommendations included in the UN report, and at the same time included false or incomplete claims.

On 14 December 2020, the Office of the Prosecutor released a report on the office's year activities, stating that it believed there was a "reasonable basis" to think that "since at least April 2017, civilian authorities, members of the armed forces and pro-government individuals have committed the crimes against humanity." and that it expected to decide in 2021 whether to open an investigation or not. On 4 November 2021, ICC Prosecutor Karim Khan announced the opening of an investigation regarding the situation in Venezuela.

The Venezuelan human rights organization PROVEA has identified more than 43,000 people whose "right to personal integrity" has been violated since Maduro took office in 2013, including 1,652 people who were tortured, 7,309 people who were subjected to "cruel, inhumane and degrading" treatment or punishment, and at least 28 people who were killed in the country's prisons.

=== Judicial independence ===
On 16 September 2021, the Independent International Fact-Finding Mission on Venezuela released its second report on the country's situation, concluding that the independence of the Venezuelan justice system under Maduro has been deeply eroded to the extent of playing an important role in aiding the state repression and perpetuating state impunity for human rights violations. The document identified frequent due process violations, including the use of pre-trial detention as a routine (rather than an exceptional measure) and judges sustaining detentions or charges based on manipulated or fabricated evidence, evidence obtained through illegal means, and evidence obtained through coercion or torture; in some of the reviewed cases, the judges also failed to protect torture victims, returning them to detentions centers were torture was denounced, "despite having heard victims, sometimes bearing visible injuries consistent with torture, make the allegation in court". The report also concluded that prosecutorial and judicial individuals at all levels witnessed or experienced external interference in decision-making and that several reported receiving instructions either from the judicial or prosecutorial hierarchy or from political officials on how to decide cases.

=== Alleged drug trafficking and money laundering ===
==== Narcosobrinos incident ====
Two nephews of Maduro's wife, Efraín Antonio Campo Flores and Francisco Flores de Freitas, were found guilty in a US court of conspiracy to import cocaine in November 2016, with some of their funds possibly assisting Maduro's presidential campaign in the 2013 Venezuelan presidential election and potentially for the 2015 Venezuelan parliamentary elections, with the funds mainly used to "help their family stay in power". One informant stated that the two often flew out of Terminal 4 of Simon Bolivar Airport, a terminal reserved for the president.

After Maduro's nephews were apprehended by the US Drug Enforcement Administration for the illegal distribution of cocaine on 10 November 2015, carrying diplomatic passports, Maduro posted a statement on Twitter criticizing "attacks and imperialist ambushes", saying "the Father land will continue on its path". Diosdado Cabello, a senior official in Maduro's government, was quoted as saying the arrests were a "kidnapping" by the United States.

On 18 November 2016, the two nephews were found guilty. On 14 December 2017, the two were sentenced to 18 years of imprisonment.

In October 2022, Maduro's nephews were freed in a prisoner swap for seven American directors of the oil refinery corporation CITGO (part of the Citgo Six) who were imprisoned in Venezuela.

==== Sanctions against Tareck El Aissami and Diosdado Cabello ====
Ex-Venezuelan vice president Tareck El Aissami, who served Maduro from 2017 to 2018, is under U.S. sanctions for drug trafficking and aiding state terrorism. He is accused by the U.S. State Department of aiding sanctioned Iran-backed terrorist organizations, including Hezbollah and Quds Force. He is also accused of having ties with various illicit organizations, including Los Zetas and Cartel of the Suns.

On 18 May 2018, the Office of Foreign Assets Control (OFAC) of the United States Department of the Treasury placed sanctions in effect against high-level official Diosdado Cabello. OFAC stated that Cabello and others used their power within the Bolivarian government "to personally profit from extortion, money laundering, and embezzlement", with Cabello allegedly directing drug trafficking activities with Venezuelan Vice President Tareck El Aissami while dividing drug profits with President Maduro.

==== US indictment of Maduro ====
On 26 March 2020, the United States Department of Justice charged Maduro and other Venezuelan officials and some Colombian former FARC members for what Attorney General William Barr described as "narco-terrorism": the shipping of cocaine to the US to wage a health war on US citizens. According to Barr, Venezuelan leaders and the FARC faction organised an "air bridge" from a Venezuelan air base transporting cocaine to Central America and a sea route to the Caribbean. The US government offered $15 million for any information that would lead to his arrest. Nicolas Maduro has frequently denied any ties to a drug trafficking syndicate.

===== Reward increases =====
After Maduro was inaugurated for a third term on 10 January 2025, the US State Department announced that the reward against Maduro was increased from $15 million to $25 million. National Security Council spokesperson John Kirby said that the decision to raise the bounty as part of "a concerted message of solidarity with the Venezuelan people", meant "to further elevate international efforts to maintain pressure on Maduro and his representatives". Secretary of State Antony Blinken said that the US "does not recognize Nicolas Maduro as the president of Venezuela" and a US Treasury Under Secretary, Bradley Smith, added that the US stood with its "likeminded partners" in "solidarity with the people's vote for new leadership and rejects Maduro's fraudulent claim of victory".

US Attorney General Pam Bondi's August 2025 announcement that the reward for Maduro's arrest has increased to $50 million.

The reward was increased again to $50 million on 7 August 2025, with Attorney General Pam Bondi accusing Maduro of collaborating with foreign terrorist organizations, such as Tren de Aragua, the Sinaloa Cartel, and the Cartel of the Suns, to bring deadly violence to the United States. In a video message, Bondi described Maduro as one of the "world's most notorious narco-traffickers" and a "threat to national security", which prompted the reward to be doubled. She concluded, "Under President Trump's leadership, Maduro will not escape justice, and he will be held accountable for his despicable crimes", before providing the public with a hotline number to report tips to the Drug Enforcement Administration.

In a Fox News interview, Bondi stated that the DOJ had seized approximately $700 million in assets linked to Maduro. The assets allegedly included multiple luxury homes in Florida, a mansion in the Dominican Republic, private jets, vehicles, a horse farm, jewelry, and large sums of cash. Bondi described Maduro's government as an "organized crime operation" that continued to function despite the seizures.

This led to mockery of Bondi and the Trump administration on social media, with the phrase "He's in Venezuela" trending on Twitter. Some internet users claimed it was a deliberate distraction from the controversy surrounding the Jeffrey Epstein client list. Venezuelan Foreign Minister Yván Gil dismissed the announcement as a "crude political propaganda operation", adding that he was not surprised given Bondi's failure to deliver the client list of the convicted sex offender Jeffrey Epstein.

Venezuelan Vice President Delcy Rodríguez dismissed Bondi's allegations as a "shameless", accusing her of staging a "cardboard cutout" performance to continue a "ridiculous and cheap show" against Maduro. Rodríguez further claimed that Bondi was not in her right mind, suggesting that the Epstein case was keeping her up at night. Maduro, for his part, dared Trump to arrest him during a nationally televised speech and warned American leaders not to even attempt such an action, saying it would provoke a response that could also lead to the end of the American empire.

=== Homophobic statements ===
As foreign minister, during a tenth anniversary gathering commemorating the 2002 Venezuelan coup d'état attempt going into the 2012 Venezuelan presidential election, Maduro called opposition members "snobs" and "little faggots".

During the presidential campaign of 2013, Maduro used anti-gay attacks as a political weapon, calling representatives of the opposition "faggots". Maduro used anti-gay speech toward his opponent Henrique Capriles calling him a "little princess".

In 2017, Maduro expressed his personal support for same-sex marriage.

=== Hunger crisis ===
In August 2017, Luisa Ortega Díaz, Chief Prosecutor of Venezuela from 2007 until her sacking in August 2017, accused Maduro of profiting from the shortages in Venezuela. The government-operated Local Committees for Supply and Production (CLAP), which provides food to impoverished Venezuelans, made contracts with Group Grand Limited, a company that Ortega said was "presumably owned by Nicolás Maduro" through front-men Rodolfo Reyes, Álvaro Uguedo Vargas and Alex Saab. The Venezuelan government paid Group Grand Limited, a Mexican entity, for basic foods, which it supplied to CLAP. Maduro accused Ortega of working with the United States to damage his government.

An April 2019 communication from the United States Department of State highlighted a 2017 National Assembly investigation finding that the government paid US$42 for food that cost under US$13 and that "Maduro's inner circle kept the difference, which totaled more than $200 million dollars in at least one case", adding that food boxes were "distributed in exchange for votes". On 18 October 2018, Mexican prosecutors accused the Venezuelan government and Mexican individuals of buying poor-quality food products for CLAP and exporting them to Venezuela to double their value for sale.

During the Venezuelan presidential crisis, Venezuelan National Assembly president Juan Guaidó said that the Maduro government had plans to steal for humanitarian purposes the products that entered the country, including plans to distribute these products through the government's food-distribution program CLAP.

While Venezuelans were affected by hunger and shortages, Maduro and his government officials publicly shared images of themselves eating luxurious meals, images that were met with displeasure by Venezuelans. Despite the majority of Venezuelans losing weight due to hunger, members of the Maduro's administration appeared to gain weight.

In November 2017, while giving a lengthy, live cadena broadcast, Maduro, unaware he was still being filmed, pulled out an empanada from his desk and began eating it. This occurred amid controversy over Maduro's gaining weight during the nationwide food and medicine shortage; with many on social media criticizing the publicly broadcast incident.

In September 2018, Maduro ate at one of Salt Bae's luxury restaurants in Istanbul, where he and his wife were served a meat-heavy meal and offered a personalized shirt and box of cigars with Maduro's name engraved. The Wall Street Journal reported that the incident received international criticism and left poor Venezuelans incensed.

In December 2018, videos and pictures were leaked showing a glamorous Christmas party that included an expensive feast, including French wine, taking place in the seat of the pro-Maduro Supreme Tribunal of Justice. The images received considerable backlash from social networks, criticizing the costs of the party during the grave economic crisis in the country and the hypocrisy of Maduro's government.

=== Corruption ===
In an investigative interview with Euzenando Prazeres de Azevedo, president of Constructora Odebrecht in Venezuela, the executive revealed how Odebrecht paid $35 million to fund Maduro's 2013 presidential campaign if Odebrecht projects would be prioritized in Venezuela. Americo Mata, Maduro's campaign manager, initially asked for $50 million for Maduro, though the final $35 million was settled.

Maduro was sentenced to 18 years and 3 months in prison on 15 August 2018 by the Supreme Tribunal of Justice of Venezuela in exile, with the exiled high court stating "there is enough evidence to establish the guilt ... [of] corruption and legitimation of capital". The Organization of American States Secretary General, Luis Almagro, supported the verdict and asked for the Venezuelan National Assembly to recognize the ruling of the Supreme Tribunal in exile.

The US State Department issued a fact sheet stating that Maduro's most serious corruption involved embezzlement in which "a European bank accepted exorbitant commissions to process approximately $2 billion in transactions related to Venezuelan third–party money launderers, shell companies, and complex financial products to siphon off funds from PdVSA". The State Department also alleges that Maduro expelled authorized foreign companies from the mining sector to allow officials to exploit Venezuela's resources for their own gain, using unregulated miners under the control of Venezuela's armed forces.

=== Sanctions ===
Announcement of sanctions against Maduro by National Security Advisor H. R. McMaster and Secretary of the Treasury Steven Mnuchin

Thirteen government officials were sanctioned by the United States Department of Treasury due to their involvement with the 2017 Venezuelan Constituent Assembly election. Two months later, the Canadian government sanctioned members of the Maduro government, including Maduro, preventing Canadian nationals from participating in property and financial deals with him due to the rupture of Venezuela's constitutional order.

After the Constituent Assembly election, the United States sanctioned Maduro on 31 July 2017, making him the fourth foreign head of state to be sanctioned by the United States after Bashar al-Assad of Syria, Kim Jong Un of North Korea and Robert Mugabe of Zimbabwe. Secretary of the Treasury Steven Mnuchin stating "Maduro is a dictator who disregards the will of the Venezuelan people". Maduro fired back at the sanctions during his victory speech saying "I don't obey imperial orders. I'm against the Ku Klux Klan that governs the White House, and I'm proud to feel that way."

In March 2018, Maduro was sanctioned by the Panamanian government for his alleged involvement with "money laundering, financing of terrorism and financing the proliferation of weapons of mass destruction".

Maduro is also banned from entering Colombia. The Colombian government maintains a list of people banned from entering Colombia or subject to expulsion; as of January 2019, the list had 200 people with a "close relationship and support for the Nicolás Maduro regime".

After the breakdown of the Barbados Agreements, he disqualified the pre-candidate Maria Corina Machado through the Supreme Court, similar to the official government. After that, the US sanctions were reapplied under the Biden administration.

In September 2024, an Argentine federal court issued an arrest warrant against Maduro and several other Venezuelan officials for crimes against humanity.

In January 2026, the Swiss government imposed a four-year freeze on any assets held by Maduro and his close associates in Switzerland. That same month, Florida governor Ron DeSantis said that the Attorney General of Florida was “looking very seriously” at the possibility of filing state charges against Maduro, accusing him of bringing drugs to Florida.

== Public opinion ==
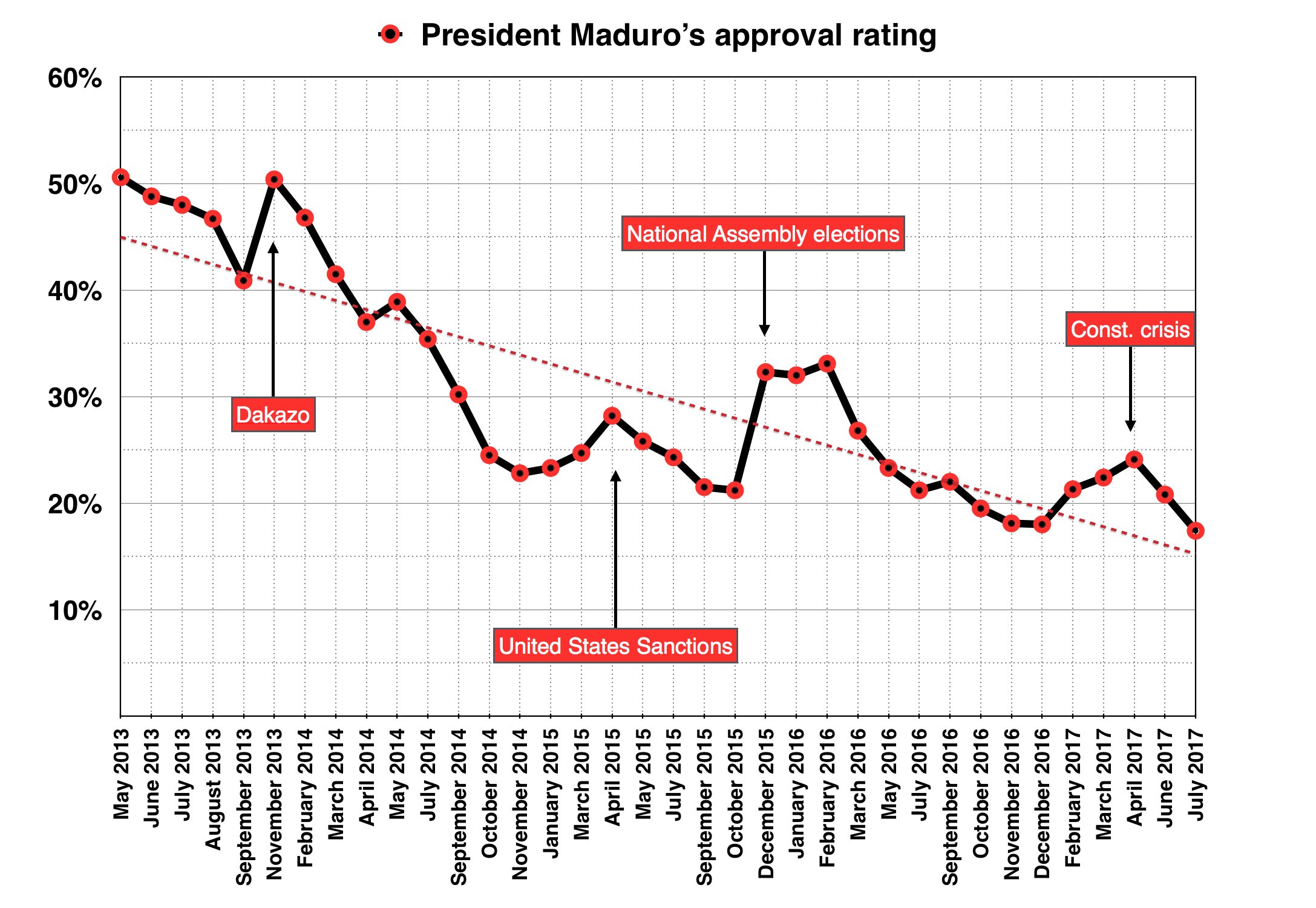
Source: Data Analysis to July 2017. In March 2019, Maduro's approval rating was 14%.

In October 2013, Maduro's approval rating stood between 45% and 50% with Reuters stating that it was possibly due to Hugo Chávez's endorsement. One year later in October 2014, Maduro's approval rating was at 24.5% according to pollster Datanálisis. In November 2014, Datanálisis polls indicated that more than 66% of Venezuelans believed that Maduro should not finish his six-year term, with government supporters representing more than 25% of those believing that Maduro should resign. In March and April 2015, Maduro saw a small increase in approval after initiating a campaign of anti-US rhetoric following the sanctioning of seven officials accused by the United States of participating in human rights violations.

During a recall movement gathered from late-October through November 2016, a poll by Venebarómetro found that "88% of 'likely' voters in a recall would choose to oust Maduro." Among similar polls, Hercon concluded that up to 81.3% of voters responded being willing to recall Maduro, Meganálisis that up to 78.3% of respondents disagreed that Maduro continued governing, and Datanálisis that 75% of Venezuelans considered that Maduro should be recalled.

In September 2018, Meganálisis polls found that 84.6% of Venezuelans surveyed wanted Maduro and his government to be removed from power. Following the suspension of the recall movement, a Venebarómetro poll found that 61.4% found that Maduro had become a dictator, while in a poll taken by Keller and Associates 63% of those questioned thought that Maduro was a dictator.

Before the 2018 presidential elections, a Datanálisis poll indicated that 16.7% of voters would vote for Maduro as candidate, compared to 27.6% and 17.1% of voters that would choose rival candidates Henri Falcón and Javier Bertucci, respectively.

During the presidential crisis, The Wall Street Journal reported that barrios were turning against Maduro in "a shift born of economic misery and police violence". Surveys between 30 January and 1 February 2019 by Meganálisis recorded that 4.1% of Venezuelans recognized Maduro as president, 11.2% were undecided, and 84.6% of respondents recognized Guaidó as interim president. The study of 1,030 Venezuelans was conducted in 16 states and 32 cities.

A separate pollster, Hinterlaces, ran a poll from 21 January to 2 February 2019 that found that 57% of Venezuelans recognized Maduro as the legitimate president of Venezuela, 32% recognized Guaidó, and 11% were unsure. By 4 March 2019, a Datanálisis poll found Guaidó's approval at 61%, and Maduro's at all-time low of 14%, with Guaidó win 77% in a theoretical election with Maduro, who received 23% of support. Datanálisis found that, among the poorest 20% of Venezuelans, Maduro's support had fallen to 18% in February 2019 from 40% two years earlier.

In a May 2019 analysis, José Briceño-Ruiz, based on the Meganalisis poll and other trends, said that Maduro was "extremely unpopular".

In February 2023, a year before the 2024 presidential elections, a Datincorp poll concluded that 15.69% of voters would vote for Maduro as a candidate, in contrast to 16.86% that would vote for opposition candidate María Corina Machado.

== In popular culture ==
- Maduro was parodied in the animated web series Isla Presidencial, along with most of the other Latin American leaders, portrayed as a man of limited intelligence, twisted speech, and capable of talking with birds, the latter being a reference to a comment made by Maduro during the 2013 presidential elections, when he said that the late Chávez had reincarnated in a little bird and talked to him to bless his candidacy.
- The 2020 revival of the Animaniacs series has featured Maduro, mocking him and the hyperinflation in Venezuela.
- Several documentaries that discuss the Bolivarian Revolution and the Crisis in Venezuela, including In the Shadow of the Revolution, Chavismo: The Plague of the 21st Century, El pueblo soy yo, and A La Calle, depict Maduro as well.

== Awards and honours ==
Revoked and returned awards and honours.

Awards and orders	Country	Date	Place	Notes
Order of the Liberator	Venezuela	19 April 2013	Caracas, Venezuela	Highest decoration of Venezuela, given to every president.
Order of the Liberator General San Martín (Revoked)	Argentina	8 May 2013	Buenos Aires, Argentina	Highest decoration of Argentina awarded by political ally President Cristina Fernández de Kirchner. Revoked on 11 August 2017 by President Mauricio Macri for human rights violations.
Order of the Condor of the Andes	Bolivia	26 May 2013	La Paz, Bolivia	Highest decoration of Bolivia.
Bicentenary Order of the Admirable Campaign	Venezuela	15 June 2013	Trujillo, Venezuela	Venezuelan order.
Star of Palestine	Palestine	16 May 2014	Caracas, Venezuela	Highest decoration of Palestine.
Order of Augusto César Sandino	Nicaragua	17 March 2015	Managua, Nicaragua	Highest decoration of Nicaragua.
Order of José Martí	Cuba	18 March 2016	La Habana, Cuba	Cuban order.
Order of Francisco Morazán	Honduras	28 January 2024	Tegucigalpa, Honduras	Highest decoration of Honduras.

=== Others ===
- In 2014, Maduro was named as one of TIME magazine's 100 Most Influential People. In the article, it explained that whether or not Venezuela collapses "now depends on Maduro", saying it also depends on whether Maduro "can step out of the shadow of his pugnacious predecessor and compromise with his opponents".
- In 2016, the Reporters Without Borders (RSF) Top 35 Predators of Press Freedom list placed Maduro as a "predator" to press freedom in Venezuela, with RSF noting his method of "carefully orchestrated censorship and economic asphyxiation" toward media organizations.
- In 2016, the Organized Crime and Corruption Reporting Project (OCCRP), an international non-governmental organization that investigates crime and corruption, gave President Maduro the Person of the Year Award that "recognizes the individual who has done the most in the world to advance organized criminal activity and corruption". The OCCRP stated that they "chose Maduro for the global award on the strength of his corrupt and oppressive reign, so rife with mismanagement that citizens of his oil-rich nation are literally starving and begging for medicines" and that Maduro and his family steal millions of dollars from government coffers to fund patronage that maintains President Maduro's power in Venezuela. The group also explains how Maduro had overruled the legislative branch filled with opposition politicians, repressed citizen protests and had relatives involved in drug trafficking.

== Elections ==
=== 2013 presidential campaign ===
Maduro won the second presidential election after the death of Hugo Chávez, with 50.61% of the votes against the opposition's candidate Henrique Capriles Radonski who had 49.12% of the votes. The Democratic Unity Roundtable contested his election as fraud and as a violation of the constitution. However, the Supreme Court of Venezuela ruled that under Venezuela's Constitution, Maduro is the legitimate president and was invested as such by the Venezuelan National Assembly (Asamblea Nacional).

=== 2018 presidential campaign ===
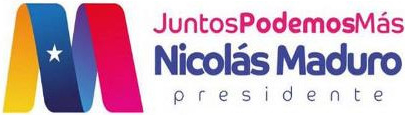
Nicolás Maduro's 2018 presidential campaign logo

Maduro was declared as the winner of the 2018 election with 67.8% of the vote. The result was denounced as fraudulent by most neighboring countries, including Argentina, Peña Nieto's Mexico, Chile, Colombia, Brazil, Canada and the United States, as well as organizations such as the European Union, and the Organization of American States, but recognized as legitimate by other neighboring countries such as López Obrador's Mexico, Bolivia, Cuba, Suriname, Nicaragua and some other ALBA countries, along with South Africa, China, Russia, North Korea, and Turkey.

=== 2024 presidential campaign ===
Maduro ran for a third consecutive term, while González represented the Unitary Platform (Spanish: Plataforma Unitaria Democrática; PUD), the main opposition political alliance. In June 2023, the Venezuelan government had barred leading candidate María Corina Machado from participating. This move was regarded by the opposition as a violation of political human rights and was condemned by international bodies such as the Organization of American States (OAS), the European Union, and Human Rights Watch, as well as numerous countries.

Academics, news outlets and the opposition provided strong evidence showing that González won the election by a wide margin with the opposition releasing copies of official tally sheets collected by poll watchers from a majority of polling centers showing a landslide victory for González. The government-controlled National Electoral Council (CNE) announced possibly falsified results claiming a narrow Maduro victory on 29 July; vote tallies were not provided. The Carter Center was unable to verify the CNE's results, asserting the election failed to meet international democratic election standards.

The CNE's results were rejected by the OAS, and the United Nations declared that there was "no precedent in contemporary democratic elections" for announcing a winner without providing tabulated results. Analyses by media sources found the CNE results statistically improbable and lacking in credibility. Parallel vote tabulation confirmed the win by González. Political scientist Steven Levitsky called the official results "one of the most egregious electoral frauds in modern Latin American history".

Protests occurred across the country and internationally, as the Maduro administration initiated Operation Tun Tun, a crackdown on dissent. Some world leaders rejected the CNE's claimed results and recognized González as the election winner, while some other countries, including Russia, China, Iran, North Korea and Cuba recognized Maduro as the winner. Maduro did not cede power, and instead asked the Supreme Tribunal of Justice (TSJ), composed of justices loyal to Maduro, to audit and approve the results.

On 22 August, as anticipated, the TSJ described the CNE's statement of Maduro winning the election as "validated". The supreme court ruling was rejected by the United States, the European Union and ten Latin American countries. An arrest warrant was issued on 2 September for González for the alleged crimes of "usurpation of functions, falsification of public documents, instigation to disobey the law, conspiracy and association", according to Reuters. After seeking asylum in the Spanish Embassy in Caracas, González left for Spain on 7 September. Maduro was sworn in for a third term on 10 January 2025.

=== Electoral history ===
Election	First round			
Election	Votes	%	Position	Result
2013	7,587,579	50.6	No. 1	Elected
2018	6,245,862	67.8	No. 1	Elected
2024	5,150,092	51.2	No. 1	Elected

== See also ==
- 2016 state of emergency in Venezuela
- List of current heads of state and government
- List of presidents of Venezuela
- List of state leaders deposed by foreign powers in the 20th and 21st century
- 2026 United States intervention in Venezuela
- Axis of Unity

== Notes ==
Political offices
Preceded by Francisco Ameliach	President of the National Assembly; 2005–2006	Succeeded by Cilia Flores
Preceded by Alí Rodríguez Araque	Minister of Foreign Affairs; 2006–2013	Succeeded by Elías Jaua
Preceded by Elías Jaua	Vice President of Venezuela; 2012–2013	Succeeded by Jorge Arreaza
Preceded by Hugo Chávez	President of Venezuela; 2013–present (de jure)	Succeeded by Delcy Rodríguez; Acting
Diplomatic posts
Preceded by Hassan Rouhani	Chair of the Non-Aligned Movement; 2016–2019	Succeeded by Ilham Aliyev
Preceded by Tabaré Vázquez	President pro tempore of the Union of South American Nations; 2016–2017	Succeeded by Mauricio Macri
Party political offices
Preceded by Hugo Chávez	Leader of the United Socialist Party of Venezuela; 2013–2026	Incumbent
