= ¿¡Revolución!? =

2006 Canadian film

- Film poster
- Directed by: Charles Gervais
- Starring: Hugo Chávez; José Vicente Rangel; Julio Borges; Donald Rumsfeld
- Cinematography: Sylvestre Guidi
- Edited by: Étienne Gagnon
- Release date: December 8, 2006
- Running time: 85 minutes
- Languages: English, French, Spanish

¿¡Revolución!? is a 2006 political documentary directed by Quebec journalist and filmmaker Charles Gervais. It examines the Bolivarian Revolution led by Venezuelan President Hugo Chávez. It was produced by Télé-Québec, the Quebec government's public television network.

As part of the Rencontres internationales du documentaire de Montréal film festival, first screenings occurred on November 10 and 14, 2006 at the Cinéma ONF in Montreal. The general opening happened on December 8, 2006, at Cinéma Ex-Centris, also in Montreal. This version showed the original Spanish spoken by the subjects, as well as narration and subtitles in French.

== Synopsis ==
¿¡Revolución!? features pro-Chávez and anti-Chávez militants, politicians and citizens, within and without the barrios (the poor districts of Venezuelan cities like Caracas). The anti-Chávez politicians interviewed are members of Primero Justicia. It also examines the nationalization of petroleum. Other Chávez opponents met by the filmmaker come from places like the newspaper El Nacional and the former direction of the petroleum industry. The director did not obtain an interview with the President, but filmed him first hand in speeches and his famous weekly Aló Presidente television show. About the situation of the freedom of the press, director Gervais said that it was easier to film in the Venezuela of Chávez than in Canada.

== Production ==
In April 2005, director Charles Gervais heard of the news that Hugo Chávez decided to distribute one million free copies of major 17th century Spanish novel Don Quixote de la Mancha to Venezuelan citizens. This gave him the inspiration to fly to Venezuela and examine from within this "revolution" in the making. Also, after filming the medium-length documentary Quand la vie est un rêve on the Haitian youth, Gervais wished to focus on something more positive.

== See also ==
- The Revolution Will Not Be Televised (documentary)
- Politics of Venezuela
- List of Quebec films
- Cinema of Quebec
- Culture of Quebec
