= Margarita Lopez Maya =

Venezuelan historian

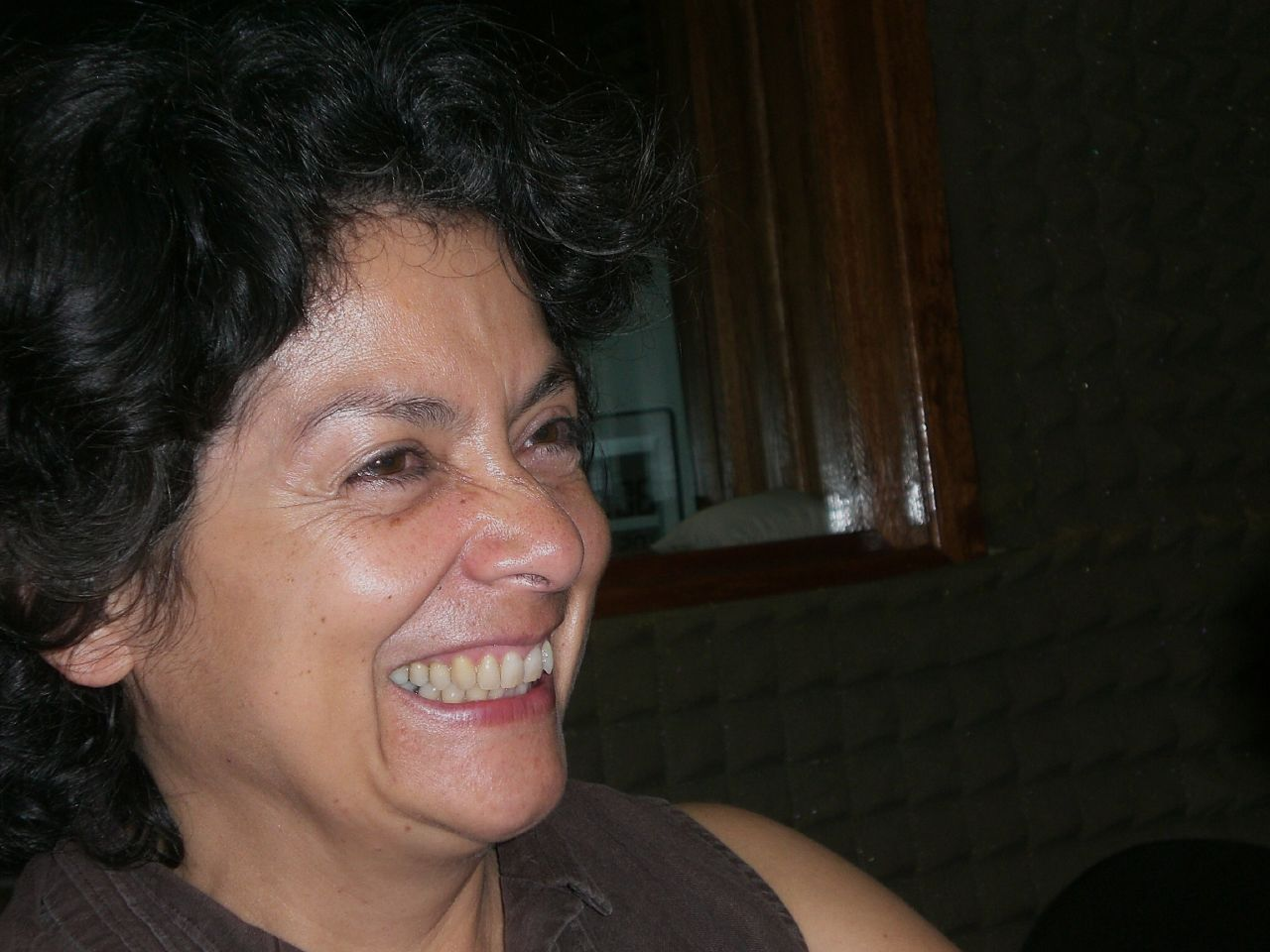
Image of Margarita López Maya

Margarita López Maya is a Venezuelan historian who is a retired professor at the Central University of Venezuela. She is known for her work on Venezuelan history, especially with respect to Hugo Chávez.

== Early life and education ==
López Maya was born in New York on June 6, 1951. She moved to Venezuela when she was six. Lopez Maya has an undergraduate degree (1981) and a Ph.D. (1995) from Universidad Central de Venezuela.

== Career ==
López Maya was on the academic staff of the Central University of Venezuela from 1982 until her retirement in 2010.

She served as editor of the journal Revista Venezolana de Economía y Ciencias Sociales from 2000 until 2004.

From 2002 until 2023 Lopez Maya served as the president of the Latin American Studies Association.

== Research ==
López Maya is known for her research and teaching in the field of the contemporary socio-historical and socio-political processes of Latin America, particularly Venezuela where she has focused on issues such as popular protest, new left-wing parties, political projects against hegemonies, social actors, and issues of conjuncture of the Chavista era. López Maya met Hugo Chávez on March 25, 1996, two years before he was elected in the 1998 presidential elections, and interviewed him. In 2013 she spoke about the impact of the 2013 Venezuelan presidential election and the implications for the country.

== Selected publications ==
- Maya, Margarita López (1986). Los suburbios caraqueños del siglo XIX (in Spanish). Caracas: Academia Nacional de la Historia. ISBN 978-980-222-011-3.
- Maya, Margarita López (1989). El Banco de los Trabajadores de Venezuela (in Spanish). Caracas: CDCH UCV. ISBN 978-980-00-0315-2.
- Maya, Margarita López (2013). "Venezuela: The Political Crisis of Post-Chavismo". Social Justice. 40 (4 (134)): 68–87. ISSN 1043-1578.
- Maya, Margarita López (2003). "The Venezuelan Caracazo of 1989: Popular Protest and Institutional Weakness". Journal of Latin American Studies. 35 (1): 117–137. doi:10.1017/S0022216X02006673. ISSN 1469-767X.
- Maya, Margarita Lopez (2022-07-28), "Hugo Chavez Frias: His Movement and His Presidency", in Ellner, Steve; Hellinger, Daniel (eds.), Venezuelan Politics in the Chavez Era: Class, Polarization, and Conflict, Lynne Rienner Publishers, pp. 73–92, doi:10.1515/9781685855918-006, ISBN 978-1-68585-591-8
