= November 1992 Venezuelan coup attempt =

Coup d'état attempt in Venezuela

November 1992 Venezuelan coup d'état attempt
- Part of the Bolivarian Revolution
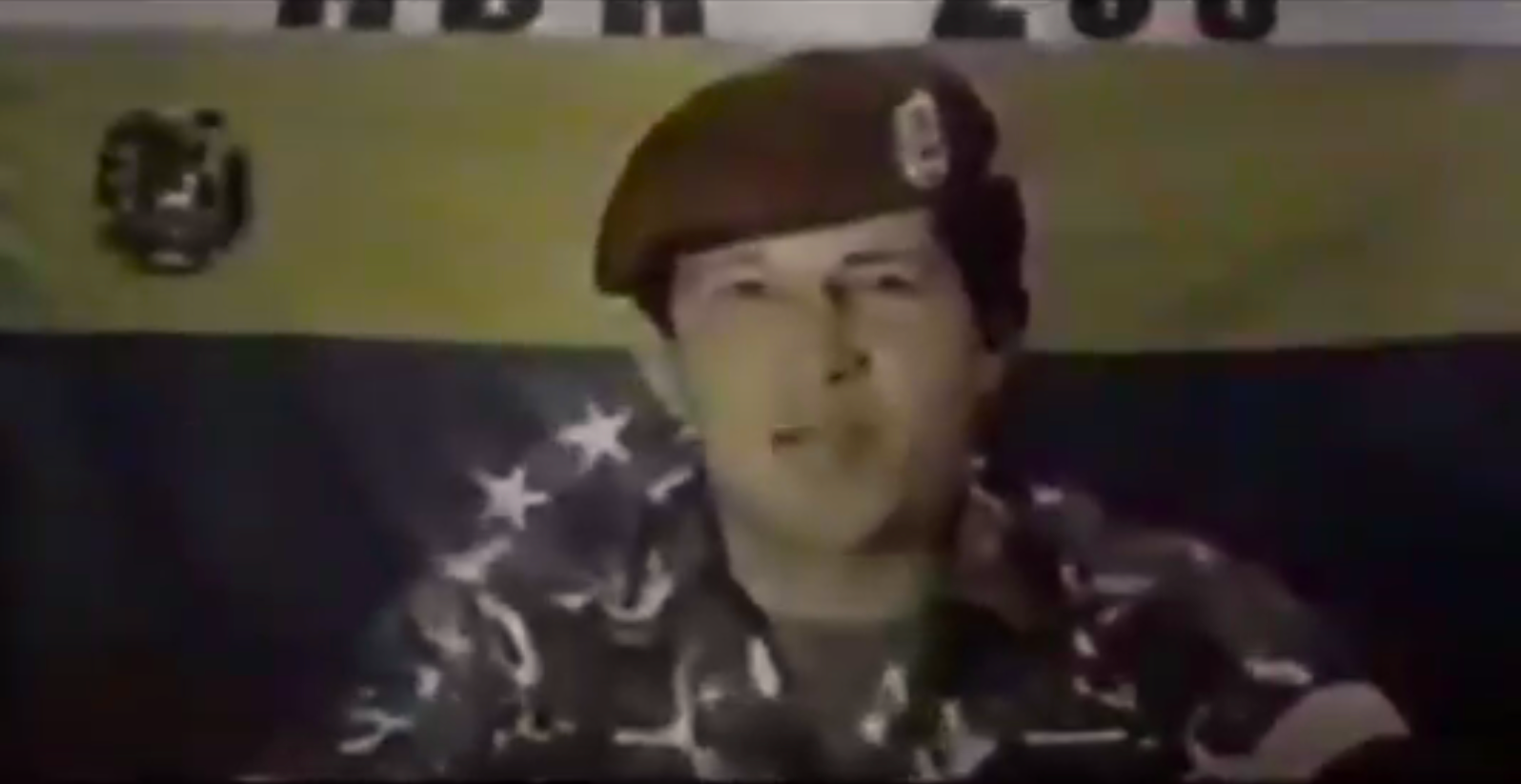
- Image of Chávez during the attempted coup
Date	27 November 1992
Location	Venezuela
Result	Failed attempt to depose the Carlos Andrés Pérez government.

Belligerents
(Venezuela) Venezuelan Government: Venezuelan Armed Forces	MBR-200; Cuba (alleged): DGI

Commanders and leaders
(Venezuela) Carlos Pérez (Venezuela) Gen. Fernando Antich	Hugo Chávez (imprisoned); Luis Reyes Reyes

Military support
Army loyalists	Military rebels

Casualties and losses
- 172 killed and 95 injured.

The Venezuelan coup attempt of November 1992 was an attempt to seize control of the government of Venezuela that took place on 27 November 1992. It was led by a group of young military officers who were loyal to the Hugo Chávez-led Revolutionary Bolivarian Movement-200 (MBR-200), while Chávez was in prison for the coup d'état attempt earlier that year.

== Background ==
Venezuela had enjoyed democratic stability since 1958, as well as a degree of prosperity. This prosperity was greatly enhanced in the 1970s, when oil prices increased substantially, and Venezuela, a large petroleum exporter, received large revenues, which increased per capita income by about 40%. Venezuela experienced modernization and had one of the highest GDP per capita in its history, while also having an exchange rate of 4 bolivares per 1 US dollar.

However, in the 1980s, other oil producers (especially Saudi Arabia) raised their production, and oil prices dropped. Venezuela's oil revenues dropped substantially, and per capita income declined by about 25%. This imperiled economic and social stability in general. The government's overspending on programs caused massive levels of debt with poverty, inflation and unemployment rising while income declined. Corruption was also widespread, with crime increasing yearly, making the Venezuelan public, primarily the poor who especially felt neglected, become outraged.

The IMF offered assistance to Venezuela with these debts, but on condition of Venezuela enacting budgetary and fiscal reforms to curtail the deficits. In 1989, President Pérez put these liberalization policies into effect, reducing social spending and many commodity subsidies, and removing longstanding price controls on many goods. The resultant discontent erupted in the "Caracazo" beginning on 27 February 1989.

=== Origin ===
Many of the participants in the coups had been members of the Partido de la Revolución Venezolana (PRV) in the 1970s. The PRV was created by ex-Communist and guerrilla fighter Douglas Bravo, who after failing in an armed insurrection, sought to infiltrate the Venezuelan armed forces to reach power. Thus, preparation for the coup began more than ten years before Pérez was re-elected in 1988.

The coup organizers rejected the ruling bipartisanship in Venezuela between the two political parties, Democratic Action and COPEI, which they saw as a corrupt and clientelist establishment.

The Movimiento Bolivariano Revolucionario 200 (MBR-200) was founded in 1982 by Lieutenant Colonel Hugo Chávez Frías, who was later joined by Francisco Arias Cárdenas. They used the Venezuelan independence hero Simón Bolívar as their group's symbol. Their main complaint was the corruption of Carlos Andrés Pérez as well as Venezuela's ongoing economic difficulties and social turmoil. In the view of these two men, the entire political system had to be changed in order for social change to occur.

In February 1989 shortly before the Caracazo, Cuban president Fidel Castro allegedly placed sleeper agents in Venezuela to create unrest. With Cuba recently entering its Special Period and experiencing economic difficulties as a result of the Soviet Union's Perestroika, Castro allegedly sought to establish an ally in Venezuela so Cuba could also enjoy funds from oil profits. As the Revolutions of 1989 occurred in Soviet states, Castro had allegedly began to organize a coup in late 1989 that would indirectly use sleeper agents who participated in the Caracazo. Castro, who was allegedly one of the main organizers according to Venezuelan Major Orlando Madriz Benítez, would instead use Chávez as the face of a civil-military action in order to avoid retaliatory actions from the United States.

While officially unconfirmed, Cuban involvement in and facilitation of the coup attempts was alleged by multiple sources. CIA analyst Brian Latell suggested that the Cuban intelligence agency, the Dirección General de Inteligencia (DGI), may have utilized Chávez to fulfill Cuban strategic dominance of Venezuela and its oil reserves. In Latell's view, the DGI may have either hired Chávez as an agent or provided critical aid to his coup plots. Latell claims Cuba had previously engaged in efforts to destabilize Venezuela by aiding guerrillas in the 1960s. According to General Carlos Julio Peñaloza in his book El Delfín de Fidel, both Fidel Castro and the succeeding President of Venezuela, Rafael Caldera, knew of Chávez's coup plot. Castro allegedly provided agents to convince President Pérez that there was no threat of a coup. After the coup, Caldera, manipulated by Castro and Chávez, was then supposed to take power after Pérez was removed from the presidency.

== Coup ==
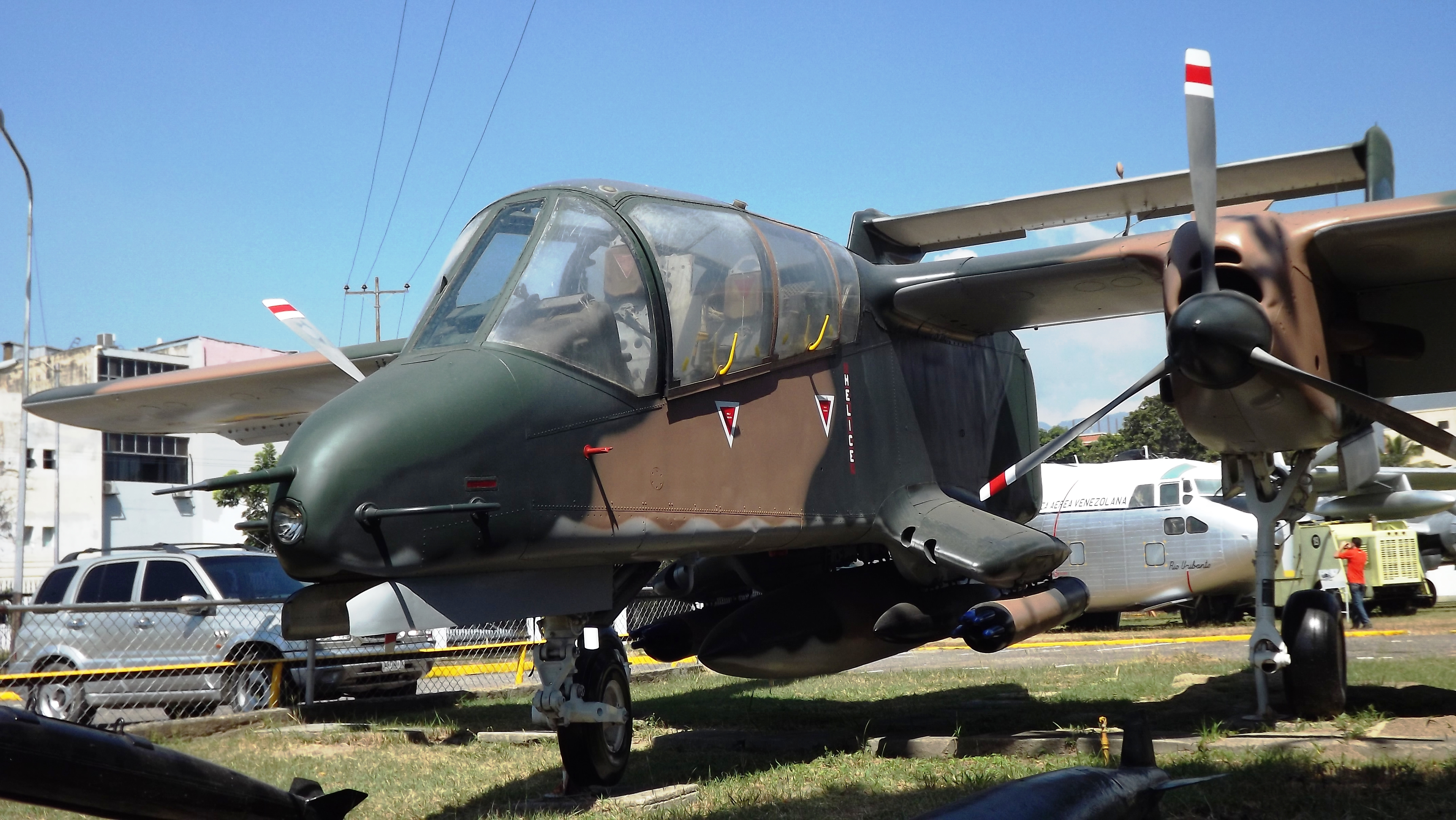
An OV-10E Bronco similar to ones used by the rebels.

On 27 November 1992, a second coup attempt was launched. It was led by officers from the air force and navy, including pilot Luis Reyes Reyes. The group had contacts with Chávez in prison and had learned some lessons from the February coup's errors, including launching at 4:30 am instead of midnight, and obtaining communications equipment to ensure they would not be stranded without it.

In a bloody shooting, they took over the Venezolana de Televisión state-run television station, killing several of the station's workers in the process. The rebels broadcast a video made in prison by Chávez, calling for a popular uprising. However, the rebels failed to take over other broadcast outlets such as Televen, allowing Pérez to address the nation and declare that the rebellion had failed.

External videos
- Chávez's rebel Broncos bombing the Sucre Police Headquarters. on YouTube

The rebels also seized control of major air bases and largely gained control of the skies. After a minor pilot defection enabled government forces to shoot down a rebel plane, the rebels bombed some targets. They bombed the Helicoide Caracas headquarters of DISIP, the Miraflores Presidential Palace, the Sucre Police headquarters and Generalissimo Francisco de Miranda Air Base. However, by 9:00 am, it was clear that there was little other success for the rebels.

Mirage fighter jets in rebel hands bombed an army barracks west of Caracas; however, the attack had little effect on slowing down the government counterattack. Around the same time, an F-16 pilot loyal to the government managed to engage and shoot down an OV-10 over the city of Barquisimeto.

An attempt to free Chávez and his associates from jail failed, and government forces retook most military bases. At about 3:00 pm, the remaining rebels took off for Peru in two C-130s, although they made it only as far as Iquitos. In total, the November death toll reached 172, much higher than the February attempt.

== Aftermath ==
Most of the coup participants fled to Peru, where they were received by dictator Alberto Fujimori as political asylees. Carlos Andrés Pérez's government had previously severed diplomatic relations with Peru in April after Fujimori carried out a self-coup the same year.

Venezolana de Television's offices reportedly suffered severe damages after the bloody battle inside the headquarters and the channel was ultimately off the air for several months.

== See also ==
- Night of the Tanks
- Los Notables
