= Night of the Tanks =

1988 Venezuelan military episode

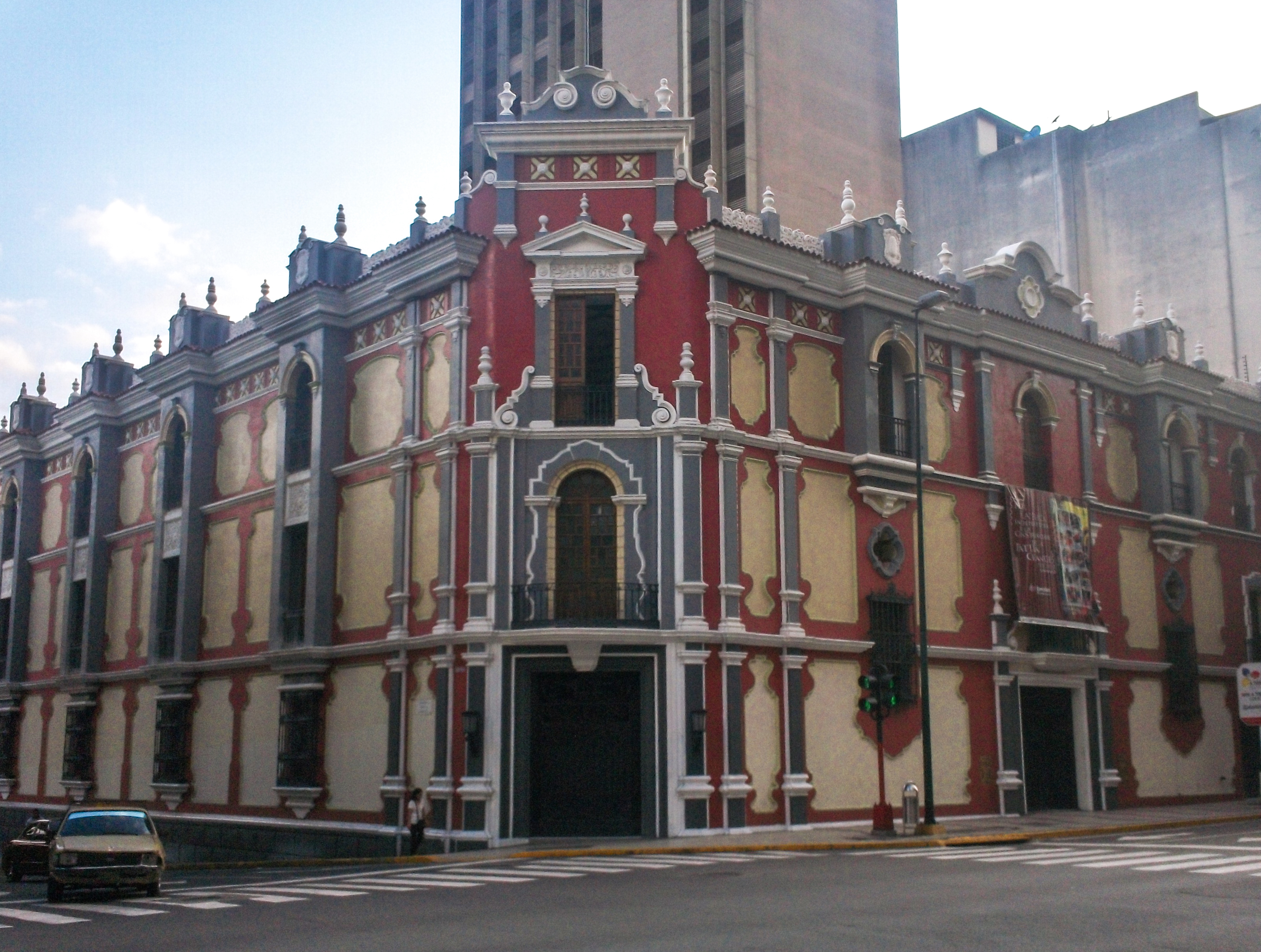
- Carmelitas Corner, where tanks were mobilized from Fort Tiuna.
Date	26 October 1988
Location	Caracas, Venezuela

Belligerents
José Domingo Soler Zambrano	Jaime Lusinchi; Simón Alberto Consalvi; Italo del Valle Alliegro

The Night of the Tanks, also known as the Tanquetazo, was a military episode that occurred in Venezuela on 26 October 1988, during the government of Jaime Lusinchi, while he was out of the country and shortly before the general elections in the country, when a column of 26 Dragon armored vehicles (V-100) were mobilized from Fort Tiuna to the area of the Miraflores Presidential Palace in downtown Caracas, for no apparent reason.

The army major who ordered the mobilization, Soler Zambrano, argued that he was following orders from superiors in order to protect the security of the acting president, Simón Alberto Consalvi, but later intelligence reports indicated that the mobilization consisted of a thwarted coup d'état.

== Events ==
On 26 October 1988, when President Jaime Lusinchi was abroad on an official visit to Uruguay, and the Minister of Internal Affairs, Simón Alberto Consalvi, was in charge of the presidency, Army Major José Domingo Soler Zambrano mobilized a column of 26 Dragon armored vehicles (V-100) from the Ayala Battalion at 7:00 p.m., Fort Tiuna to the area of the Miraflores Presidential Palace in downtown Caracas, to the Carmelitas corner on Urdaneta Avenue, for no apparent reason.

The tanks took strategic positions around the headquarters of the Ministry of Internal Affairs under the command of Captain Echeverría, and another column took the presidential residence of La Viñeta. Consalvi, who was surprised by the mobilization, was working at the headquarters of the ministry. Captain Echeverría informed him that the presence of the tanks there was to "provide protection to the acting president". Consalvi immediately communicated with the Minister of Defense, General Italo del Valle Alliegro, who, equally surprised, ordered the withdrawal of the tanks which had taken both the Ministry of the Interior and the presidential residence of La Viñeta, as well as the preventive arrest of Major Soler and the captains who commanded the tank columns.

== Investigation ==
Having carried out the mobilization, Major Soler Zambrano had violated all the protocols and procedures established for the realization of any military operation, which requires a series of confirmations by encrypted radiograms, direct and written orders and other security measures. Soler was immediately subjected to military trial and interrogated for several days about the motives for ordering the mobilization of the tanks, answering that he was obeying orders given by telephone by the inspector general and second army commander, Major General Juan José Bastardo Velásquez, who denied being the author of the order.

A few days after the events, the Amparo massacre took place, which occupied the national attention, and later the Minister of Defense ordered to close the file of the Night of the Tanks, so no further proceedings, statements or new arrests were made in connection with the events. Candidate Carlos Andrés Pérez assumed the presidency in 1989, and shortly after the beginning of his term he faced the Caracazo, so no more attention was paid to the events. The episode was met with indifference, no further investigations were carried out and no disciplinary measures were taken in the army in response.^{[1][2][3]} Later on, the conspirators of the 1992 coup attempts were implicated in the Night of the Tanks, including Hugo Chávez.

== Motives ==
According to Major Soler, the mobilization of the tanks occurred in response to the supposed information of a plot against Consalvi's life. Later intelligence reports indicated that the mobilization consisted of a frustrated coup d'état. According to General Herminio Fuenmayor, the Night of the Tanks was a failed attempt by some officers to secure promotions quickly. According to him, the conspirators would have used an army major to mobilize the tanks, be able to argue violations to security protocols and then bet on the elimination of two entire military promotions; the mass dismissal would have been similar to what happened in the Soviet Union, after Mathias Rust landed his light aircraft in Moscow's Red Square. By getting rid of two promotions of generals, the plotters would occupy command positions.

== See also ==
- Presidency of Jaime Lusinchi
- February 1992 Venezuelan coup attempt
- November 1992 Venezuelan coup attempt
