= Bolivarian Revolution =

21st-century political process in Venezuela

- Part of the pink tide
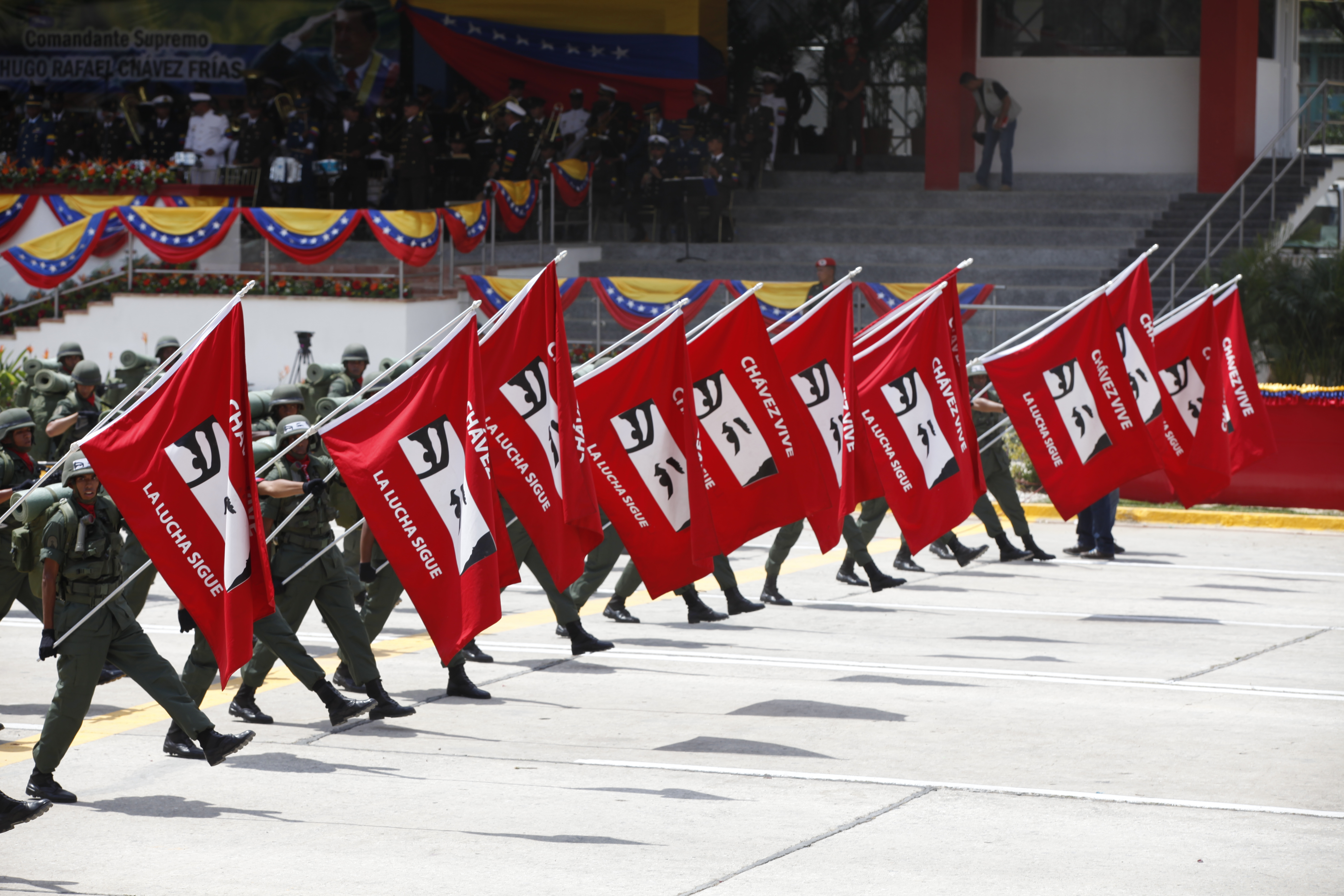
- Soldiers carrying flags featuring Chávez eyes.
- Date: Chávez's coup attempts: 4 February 1992 – 27 November 1992; Chávez's rise to a prominent politician: 27 November 1992– 6 December 1998; Chávez time as President-elect: 6 December 1998 – 2 February 1999; Bolivarian Revolution in power 2 February 1999 – present
- Location: Venezuela
- Cause: Discontent with the two-party system (Puntofijismo); Government corruption; Extreme poverty and wealth inequality; Austerity measures under President Carlos Andrés Pérez; Social unrest, including the Caracazo
- Motive: Establishment of a Bolivarian state; Creation of a new constitution; Expansion of state control of key industries, including oil
- Outcome: Election of Hugo Chávez in 1998; End of the Republic of Venezuela and adoption of the 1999 Constitution; Rebranding as the Bolivarian Republic of Venezuela; Unchecked rise in corruption; Democratic backsliding and establishment of an authoritarian state; Unchecked rise in unemployment; Unchecked rise in poverty; Unchecked rise in wealth inequality; Unchecked rise in crime; 2002 coup attempt; Expansion of the Colombian conflict into Venezuelan territory; Start of the Pemon conflict; Expansion of social programs (misiones) and oil sector nationalization; Political, social and infrastructure crisis, including hyperinflation, Shortages and mass migration; Collapse of the Economy; Collapse of the Energy sector; Collapse of the Health System; Death of Hugo Chávez in 2013; presidency of Nicolás Maduro; President Nicolás Maduro captured by US forces in 2026 as part of Operation Southern Spear; Delcy Rodríguez assumes presidency in an acting capacity

The Bolivarian Revolution (Spanish: Revolución bolivariana) is a social revolution and ongoing political process in Venezuela that was started by Venezuelan President Hugo Chávez, the founder of the Fifth Republic Movement (MVR) and later the United Socialist Party of Venezuela (PSUV), and his successors Nicolás Maduro and Delcy Rodríguez. The Bolivarian Revolution is named after Simón Bolívar, an early 19th-century Venezuelan revolutionary leader, prominent in the Spanish American wars of independence in achieving the independence of most of northern South America from Spanish rule. According to Chávez and other supporters, the Bolivarian Revolution seeks to build an inter-American coalition to implement Bolivarianism, nationalism, and a state-led economy.

Chávez and MVR won the 1998 Venezuelan presidential election and initiated the constituent process that resulted in the Venezuelan Constitution of 1999. On his 57th birthday in 2011, while announcing that he was being treated for cancer, Chávez announced that he had changed the slogan of the Bolivarian Revolution from "Motherland, socialism, or death" to "Motherland and socialism. We will live, and we will come out victorious". Following the death of Chávez in 2013, the movement declined, and the political and economic situation in Venezuela has rapidly deteriorated, resulting in the Venezuelan crisis.

As of 2018, the vast majority of mayoral and gubernatorial offices are held by PSUV candidates, while the opposition Democratic Unity Roundtable (MUD) coalition won two thirds of parliamentary seats in 2015. Political hostility between the PSUV and MUD has led to several incidents where both pro-government and opposition demonstrations have turned violent, with an estimated 150 dead as a result in 2017. Several opposition figures have been subject to politically motivated detentions.

== Background ==
Simón Bolívar has left a long-lasting imprint on the history of Venezuela in particular and South America in general. As a military cadet, Hugo Chávez was "a celebrant of the Bolivarian passion story". Chávez relied upon the ideas of Bolívar and on Bolívar as a popular symbol later in his military career as he put together his MBR-200 movement became a vehicle for his February 1992 Venezuelan coup attempt. The 1980s oil glut caused an economic crisis to take hold in Venezuela, and the country had accrued significant levels of debt. Nevertheless, the administration of left-leaning President Jaime Lusinchi was able to restructure the country's debt repayments and offset an economic crisis but allow for the continuation of the government's policies of social spending and state-sponsored subsidies. Lusinchi's political party, the Democratic Action, was able to remain in power following the 1988 Venezuelan general election, where Carlos Andrés Pérez was elected as President of Venezuela.

Pérez proposed a major shift in policy by implementing economic reforms recommended by the International Monetary Fund (IMF). Measures taken by Pérez included privatizing state companies, tax reform, reducing customs duties, and diminishing the role of the state in the economy. He also took measures to decentralize and modernize the Venezuelan political system by the direct election of state governors, who had previously been appointed by the president. The most controversial part of the economic reform package was the reduction of the gasoline subsidies, which had long maintained domestic gasoline prices far beneath international levels and even the production costs. In response to the government's economic reforms and the resulting increase in the price of gasoline and transportation, a wave of protests and riots known as El Caracazo started on 27 February 1989 in Guarenas, spreading to Caracas and surrounding towns. The weeklong clashes resulted in the deaths of hundreds of people, mostly at the hands of security forces and the military.

== Policies ==
=== Domestic ===
Chavismo policies include nationalization, social welfare programs (known as Bolivarian missions), and opposition to economic liberalization reforms (particularly the policies of the IMF and the World Bank). According to Chávez, Venezuelan socialism accepts private property; at the same time, his socialism of the 21st century seeks to promote social property. In January 2007, Chávez proposed to build the communal state, whose main idea is to build self-government institutions like communal councils, communes and communal cities.

=== International ===
In February 2016, the United States Army Combined Arms Command observed:

A few years after Chávez rose to power in 1999, he began implementing a political-strategic plan he called the 'Bolivarian Revolution,' which threatened North American rule by promising a Latin American liberation from the Monroe doctrine. Chávez's plan was characterized by a hostile and confrontational posture toward the United States, actions designed to export Chávez's autocratic, socialist model to other countries of the region, and a foreign policy that embroiled Venezuela in international-level conflicts.

Chávez was seen as a leader of the "pink tide", a turn towards left-wing governments in Latin American democracies. Analysts have pointed out additional anti-American, left-wing populist, and authoritarian-leaning traits in those governments. Chávez refocused Venezuelan foreign policy on Latin American economic and social integration by enacting bilateral trade and reciprocal aid agreements, including his "oil diplomacy", making Venezuela more dependent on using oil (its main commodity) and increasing its long-term vulnerability. Although Chávez inspired other movements in Latin America to follow his model of chavismo in an attempt to reshape South America, it was later seen as erratic, and his influence internationally became exaggerated, with the pink tide beginning to subside in 2009.

== Bolivarian missions ==
The social programs (called "missions" in Venezuela) that came into being during the term of Hugo Chávez sought to reduce social disparities and were funded in large part by oil revenues. The sustainability and design of the welfare programs have been both praised and criticized. Specific examples of social programs are listed below.

=== Plan Bolívar 2000 ===
Plan Bolívar 2000 was the first of the Bolivarian missions enacted under of Chávez. According to the United States Department of State, Chávez wanted to "send the message that the military was not a force of popular repression, but rather a force for development and security". The State Department also commented that this happened "only 23 days after his inauguration" and that he wanted to show his closest supporters "that he had not forgotten them". Several scandals affected the program as allegations of corruption were formulated against generals involved in the plan, arguing that significant amounts of money had been diverted.

=== Mission Barrio Adentro ===
The mission was to provide comprehensive publicly funded health care, dental care and sports training to poor and marginalized communities in Venezuela. Barrio Adentro featured the construction of thousands of iconic two-story medical clinics—consultorios or doctor's offices—as well as staffing with resident certified medical professionals. Barrio Adentro constitutes an attempt to deliver a de facto form of universal health care, seeking to guarantee access to quality and cradle-to-grave medical attention for all Venezuelan citizens. As of 2006, the staff included 31,439 professionals, technical personnel, and health technicians, of which 15,356 were Cuban doctors and 1,234 Venezuelan doctors. The Latin American branch of the World Health Organization and UNICEF both praised the program.

Although positive outcomes have come from the mission, there have been some struggles as well. In July 2007, Douglas León Natera, chairman of the Venezuelan Medical Federation, reported that up to 70% of the modules of Barrio Adentro were either abandoned or were left unfinished. In 2014, residents in Caracas complained of the service despite large funding from the Venezuelan government.

=== Mission Habitat ===
Mission Habitat's goal is the construction of thousands of housing units for the poor. The program also seeks to develop agreeable and integrated housing zones that make available a full range of social services—from education to healthcare—which likens its vision to that of New Urbanism. According to Venezuela's El Universal, one of the Chávez administration's outstanding weaknesses is the failure to meet its goals of construction of housing. Chávez promised to build 150,000 houses in 2006, but in the first half of the year completed only 24 percent of that target, with 35,000 houses.

=== Mission Mercal ===
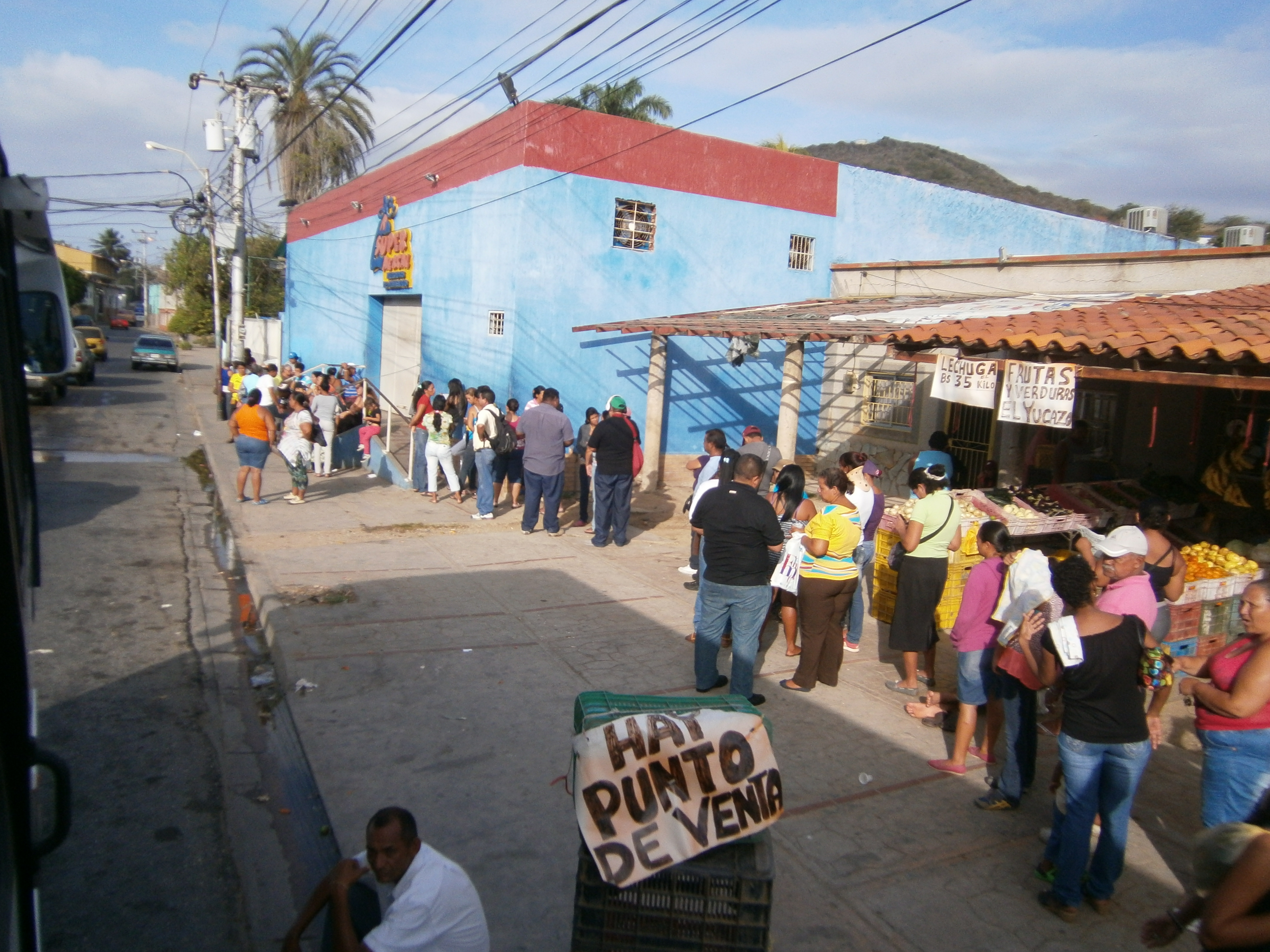
Shoppers waiting in line at a Mercal store in 2014

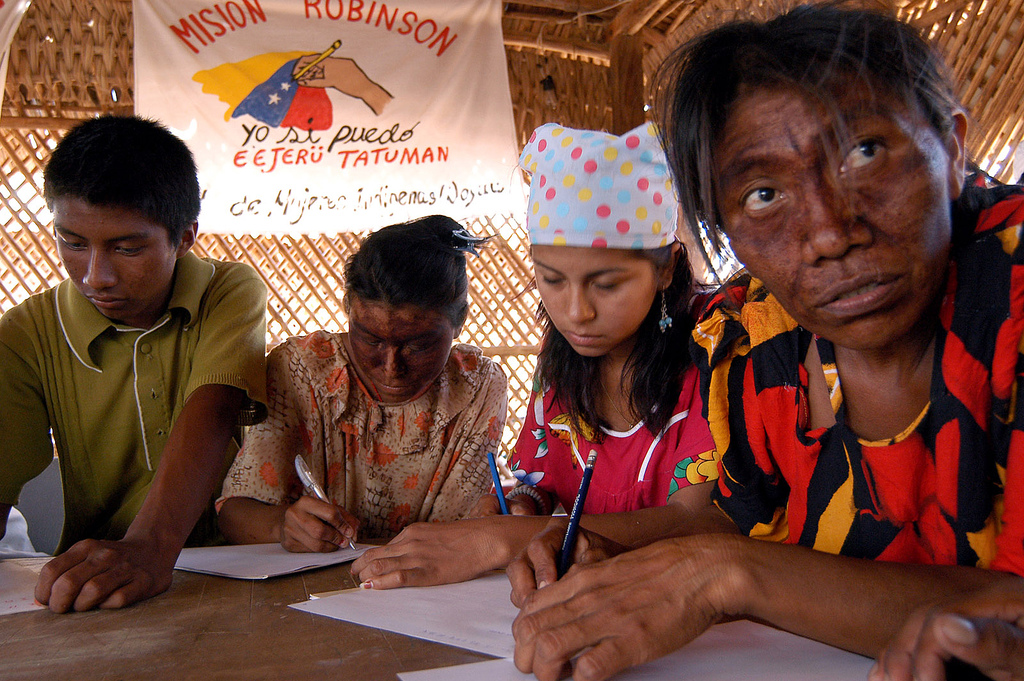
Mission Robinson of the Hugo Chávez government in Venezuela promoting the education of the Wayuu

Mission Mercal involves a state-run company called Mercados de Alimentos, C.A. (MERCAL) which provides subsidised food and basic goods through a nationwide chain of stores. In 2010 Mercal was reported as having 16,600 outlets, "ranging from street-corner shops to huge warehouse stores", in addition to 6,000 soup kitchens. Mercal employs 85,000 workers. In 2006, some 11.36 million Venezuelans benefited from Mercal food programs on a regular basis. At least 14,208 Mission Mercal food distribution sites were spread throughout Venezuela and 4,543 metric tons of food distributed each day. In recent times, customers who had to wait in long lines for discounted products say that there were a lack of products in Mercal stores and that items available at the stores change constantly. Some customers complained about rationing being enforced at Mercal stores due to the lack of products. In some cases, protests have occurred due to the shortages in stores.

=== Mission Robinson ===
The program uses volunteers to teach reading, writing and arithmetic to the more than 1.5 million Venezuelan adults who were illiterate prior to Chávez's election to the presidency in 1999. The program is military-civilian in nature and sends soldiers to—among other places—remote and dangerous locales in order to reach the most undereducated, neglected and marginalized adult citizens to give them regular schooling and lessons. In 2005 Venezuela declared itself a "Territory Free of Illiteracy", having raised in its initial estimates the literacy rate to around 99%, although the statistic was changed to 96%. According to UNESCO standards, a country can be declared "illiteracy-free" if 96% of its population over age 15 can read and write.

According to Francisco Rodríguez and Daniel Ortega of IESA, there has been "little evidence" of "statistically distinguishable effect on Venezuelan illiteracy". The Venezuelan government claimed that it had taught 1.5 million Venezuelans to read, but the study found that only 1.1 million were illiterate to begin with and that the illiteracy reduction of less than 100,000 can be attributed to adults that were elderly and died. David Rosnick and Mark Weisbrot of the Center for Economic and Policy Research responded to these doubts, finding that the data used by Rodríguez and Ortega was too crude a measure since the Household Survey from which it derived was not designed to measure literacy or reading skills and their methods were inappropriate to provide statistical evidence regarding the size of the program. Rodríguez responded to Weisbrot's rebuttal by showing that Weisbrot used biased, distorted data and that the illiteracy argument Weisbrot used showed the opposite of what Weisbrot was attempting to convey.

== Decline ==
There's not much left of the so-called Bolivarian Revolution—a socialist political process that began in 1999, headed by then-President Hugo Chávez. Endless food lines, a severe shortage of basic goods and an annual inflation rate estimated at 160 percent became the standard image of a country long considered a "petrostate". But with the price of oil as low as $35 a barrel recently, it's long been on its way to total collapse.

— Haaretz, September 2016

Following the death of Chávez, his successor Nicolás Maduro faced the consequences of Chávez's policies, with Maduro's approval declining and the start of the 2014 Venezuela protests. The Chávez and Maduro administrations often blamed difficulties that Venezuela faced on foreign intervention in the country's affairs.

In 2016 Bolivarian Venezuela suffered from hyperinflation and a dramatic loss of jobs and income (consumer prices rose 800% and the economy contracted by 19% during 2016), widespread hunger (the "Venezuela's Living Conditions Survey" (ENCOVI) found nearly 75% of the population had lost an average of at least 8.7 kg in weight from malnutrition) and a soaring murder rate (90 people per 100,000 had been murdered in Venezuela in 2015 compared to 5 per 100,000 in the United States according to the Observatory of Venezuelan Violence). In August 2016, Human Rights Watch reported:

To silence critics, the government has conducted widespread arrests and other repression. Since 2014, we have been documenting the violent response of security forces to protests, with beatings and arrests of peaceful demonstrators and even bystanders and torture in detention. The Venezuelan Penal Forum, a nongovernmental group that provides legal assistance to detainees, counts more than 90 people it considers political prisoners.

According to the International Policy Digest, "[t]he Bolivarian revolution is a failure not because its ideals were unachievable but because its leaders were as corrupt as those they decry", with the Bolivarian government relying on oil for its economy, essentially suffering from Dutch disease. As a result of the Bolivarian government's policies, Venezuelans suffered from shortages, inflation, crime and other socioeconomic issues, with many Venezuelans resorting to leave their native country to seek a better life elsewhere.

=== Venezuelan refugee crisis ===
Following the Bolivarian Revolution, initially many wealthy Venezuelans sought residence in other countries. According to Newsweek, the "Bolivarian diaspora is a reversal of fortune on a massive scale" where the reversal is a comparison to when in the 20th century "Venezuela was a haven for immigrants fleeing Old World repression and intolerance". El Universal explains how the Venezuelan refugee crisis has been caused by the "deterioration of both the economy and the social fabric, rampant crime, uncertainty and lack of hope for a change in leadership in the near future."

In 1998, the year Chavez was first elected, only 14 Venezuelans were granted asylum in the United States. By September 1999, 1,086 Venezuelans were granted asylum according to the United States Citizenship and Immigration Services. It has been calculated that from 1998 to 2013 over 1.5 million Venezuelans, between 4% and 6% of the population, left the country following the Bolivarian Revolution. Reasons for leaving Venezuela included lacking of freedom, high levels of insecurity and lack of opportunity in the country. Many parents encouraged their children to leave the country, which has led to human capital flight. In 2018, the United Nations High Commissioner for Refugees and International Organization for Migration said the number of refugees had risen to 3 million, most of which had gone to other Latin American countries and the Caribbean.

== Impact on other countries ==
Bolivarianism was emulated in Bolivia and Ecuador, which experienced crises of political parties. According to a 2017 study, Bolivarianism failed to spread further through Latin America and the Caribbean "in nations where political parties and democratic institutions remained functioning, and where the left and civil society valued democracy, pluralism, and liberal rights due to brutal autocratic experiences". The study found that the fear of Bolivarianism led to a coup against President Manuel Zelaya in Honduras. Aspects of Bolivarianism were adopted by the Spanish political party Podemos.

== See also ==
- Bolivarian Continental Movement
- Bolivarian Revolution in film
- Censorship during the Bolivarian Revolution
- The Citizens' Revolution
