= MCB =

MCB or mcb may refer to:

== Science and technology ==
- Marine cloud brightening
- Molecular and Cellular Biology, a scientific journal
- Monochlorobenzene, an organic solvent
- Miniature circuit breaker, in electrical distribution boards
- Manually Controlled Barriers, a type of level crossing in the UK

== Organisations ==
- Mauritius Commercial Bank, the oldest and largest banking institution in Mauritius
  - MCB Group, a financial services holding company based in Mauritius, Mauritius Commercial Bank's holding company
- Muslim Commercial Bank, former name of MCB Bank Limited, a network of banks in Pakistan
- Maidenhead Citadel Band, of The Salvation Army
- Methodist College Belfast, a voluntary grammar school in Belfast, Northern Ireland
- Muslim Council of Britain, an umbrella body for 500 mosques, schools and associations in Britain
- Movimiento Continental Bolivariano, Spanish name of the Bolivarian Continental Movement, a left-wing political movement in Latin America

== Transport ==
- McComb (Amtrak station) (Amtrak station code), Mississippi, US
- Moulsecoomb railway station, a railway station in Sussex, England

== Other uses ==
- Janney coupler or Master Car Builders coupler, a type railroad coupling
- Master combat badges (or MCBs) of the United States Army
- MCB Tower, a skyscraper in Pakistan, owned by MCB Bank Limited

== See also ==
- United States Marine Corps Bases:
  - Marine Corps Base Quantico
  - Marine Corps Base Camp Pendleton
