= Los Notables =

Venezuelan group of intellectuals

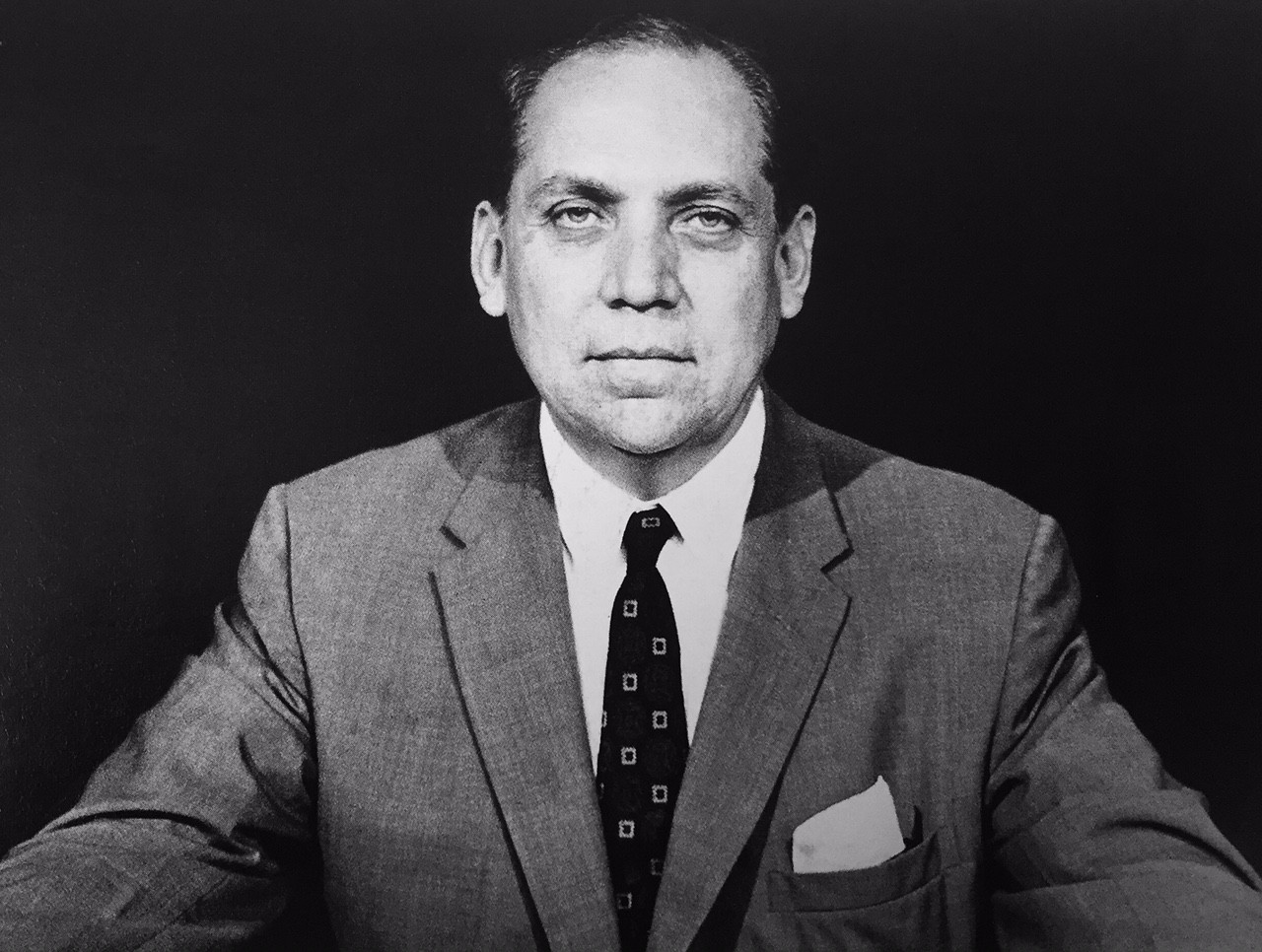
Arturo Uslar Pietri, main figure of Los Notables

Los Notables (lit. 'The Notables') were a group of Venezuelan intellectuals formed in 1990 and headed by Arturo Uslar Pietri critical of the second government of Carlos Andrés Pérez who proposed the implementation of several public reforms. The group would later demand the proposals implementation, demand the resignation or dismissal of Carlos Andrés and would criticize other state institutions, including the Venezuelan Supreme Court and judicial system, the Supreme Electoral Council, the Congress and the political parties. It was later suggested that members of the group may have been involved in subsequent conspiracies against the government of Carlos Andres, including the first and second attempted coup d'état in Venezuela in 1992. Rafael Caldera and Ramón Escovar Salom, Venezuela's attorney general, are also usually included in the group.

== Background ==
After the 1970's oil boom, the Venezuelan economy entered into crisis as a result of the indebtedness incurred by the first government of Carlos Andrés Pérez. Starting with the 1980's fall of oil prices, a gradual economic slowdown began while the Venezuelan State increased its revenues and expenses, which caused a devaluation of the currency in 1983. From then on, the economic policies of the governments of Luis Herrera Campíns and Jaime Lusinchi were not able to stop the inflationary spirals, generating distrust in investments and loss of credibility in the national currency. Some of the measures applied by these governments to stop the structural effects were the establishment of the Differential Exchange Rate Regime (RECADI), during the Herrera Campins government, and a price control, during the Lusinchi government, measures that resulted in administrative corruption and black markets of foreign currency and goods. Carlos Andrés Pérez, elected as Democratic Action's candidate on 4 December 1988, began a series of liberalizing economic measures in response to the crisis known as El Gran Viraje.

During his presidency, personal animosity towards Carlos Andres from some sectors of society joined the rejection of his economic measures, causing an agreement between the right and the political left in their rejection of Pérez. Carlos Andrés served as Minister of Internal Affairs during the government of Rómulo Betancourt, where he played an important role against the anti-guerrilla struggle, which had generated resentment in sectors of the left. During the first government of Andrés Pérez, Ramón Escovar Salom was removed as Minister of Foreign Affairs. Democratic Action was also involved in the 1945 Venezuelan coup d'état against the government of Isaías Medina Angarita, where Arturo Uslar Pietri had held the position of Minister of Internal Affairs. Said coup thwarted Uslar Pietri's political aspirations, including the possibility of becoming President of Venezuela.

== History ==
On 10 August 1990, a group of intellectuals, including Arturo Uslar Pietri, organized as a civil association and published an open letter addressed to President Carlos Andrés Pérez, proposing electoral and judicial reforms. The group would later become known as "Los Notables" and the signatories were as follows:

- Arturo Luis Berti
- Alfonzo Ravard
- Alfredo Boulton
- Arnoldo Gabaldón
- Arturo Uslar Pietri
- Carlos Guillermo Rangel
- Domingo F. Maza Zabala
- Elías Rodríguez Azpúrua
- Eloy Lares Martínez
- Ernesto Mayz Vallenilla
- Hernán Méndez Castellanos
- Ignacio Iribarren
- Isbelia Sequera Segnini
- Jacinto Convit
- José Melich Orsini
- José Román Duque Sánchez
- José Santos Urriola
- José Vicente Rangel
- María Teresa Castillo
- Martín Vegas
- Miguel Ángel Burelli Rivas
- Pastor Oropeza
- Pedro A. Palma
- Rafael Pizani
- Tulio Chiossone

On 25 August, Arturo Uslar Pietri proposed the creation of the figure of a prime minister, and on 3 December, the group of Los Notables published a second document in which they complained about the Executive and the political parties for not taking into account their demand for uninominal elections and judicial reform.

On 30 July 1991, Los Notables publish a third document demanding the satisfaction of their petitions as a response to the national crisis. In an interview to El Nacional, Uslar Pietri declared on 17 November that if answers were not given to the Venezuelan crisis, a coup d'état could take place. On 1 December, Uslar Pietri again declares in RCTV's Primer Plano talk show that "it would be idiotic to deny the possibility of a coup".

By 1992 the group had gained significant renown and prestige, aided by their academic careers. It was later suggested that members of the group could have been involved in subsequent conspiracies against the government of Carlos Andres, including the first and second coup attempts of 1992. After the 4 February coup d'état attempt, Los Notables proceeded to press for greater demands, including criticism of the Supreme Court of Justice and the Venezuelan judicial system, the Supreme Electoral Council (demanding judicial and electoral reform that included uninational voting), political parties, Congress and the government of Carlos Andrés. After the coup, Uslar Pietri declared that "it would be very serious to think" that the military rebels were just "madmen who threw the parade" because with other Venezuelans they shared "a sovereign dislike for the way the government functioned".

In an extraordinary session of the National Congress on the occasion of the coup d'état attempt, then Senator Rafael Caldera made the following speech:

Spanish

No es la repetición de los mismos discursos que hace treinta años se pronunciaban cada vez que ocurría algún levantamiento lo que responde a la preocupación popular. [...] Es difícil pedirle al pueblo que se inmole por la libertad y por la democracia, cuando piensa que la libertad y la democracia no son capaces de darle de comer. [...]
Esta situación no se puede ocultar. El golpe militar es censurable y condenable en toda forma, pero sería ingenuo pensar que se trata solamente de una aventura de unos cuantos ambiciosos que por su cuenta se lanzaron precipitadamente y sin darse cuenta de aquello en que se estaban metiendo. [...]
Quiero decir que esto que estamos enfrentando responde a una grave situación que está atravesando Venezuela. Yo quisiera que los señores jefes de Estado de los países ricos que llamaron al presidente Carlos Andrés Pérez para expresarle su solidaridad en defensa de la democracia entendieran que la democracia no puede existir si los pueblos no comen. [...]
Esto lo está viviendo el país. Y no es que yo diga que los militares se alzaron hoy o que intentaron la sublevación que ya felizmente ha sido aplastada (por lo menos en sus aspectos fundamentales) se hayan levando por eso, pero eso les ha servido de base, de motivo, de fundamento, o por lo menos de pretexto para realizar sus acciones.

Translation:
English

It is not the repetition of the same speeches that thirty years ago were pronounced every time an uprising occurred that responds to popular concern. [...] It is difficult to ask the people to sacrifice themselves for freedom and democracy, when they think that freedom and democracy are not capable of feeding them. [...]
This situation cannot be hidden. The military coup is reprehensible and condemnable in every way, but it would be naive to think that it is only an adventure of a few ambitious people who, on their own, rushed headlong into it without realizing what they were getting into. [...]
I mean to say that what we are facing responds to a serious situation that Venezuela is going through. I would like the heads of state of the rich countries who called President Carlos Andrés Pérez to express their solidarity in defense of democracy to understand that democracy cannot exist if the people do not eat. [...]
The country is experiencing this. And it is not that I say that the military rose up today or that they attempted the uprising that has been happily crushed (at least in its fundamental aspects), but this has served them as a basis, a motive, a foundation, or at least a pretext to carry out their actions.

A confidential report prepared by the National Directorate of Intelligence and Prevention Services (DISIP) in March 1992 for President Carlos Andrés linked Arturo Uslar Pietri and Douglas Bravo to participate in the coup attempt. Despite its confidentiality, it was widely published by the local press and caused discomfort among those mentioned in the conspiracy, who denied any involvement. The connection with the intellectuals of the group of Los Notables was due to their coincidence in demanding the resignation of the magistrates of the Supreme Court of Justice, which was raised in a public act at the Hilton Hotel after the coup, in the presence of Douglas Bravo, Francisco Prada Barasarte (Hugo Chávez's connection) and Tarek William Saab.

After the first coup attempt, Carlos Andrés created the Consultative Council to recommend new policies. Several of the proposals made by the Council included proposals from the group of Los Notables.

Afterwards, one of the leaders of the second coup attempt on 27 November 1992, Francisco Visconti, stated from his refuge in Iquitos, Peru, that the conspirators were more inclined to approach some civilians for this attempt and considered governing with some members of Los Notables. However, Visconti denied that Uslar Pietri was involved in the movement.

One of the members of Los Notables, José Vicente Rangel, denounced in his television program the alleged embezzlement in the use of a secret fund of Carlos Andrés Pérez. The accusation was picked up by Attorney General Ramón Escovar Salom, whom Pérez had appointed to the position, in spite of the existing hostility between them.

The group of Notables insisted on the seriousness of the country's crisis and the need for Carlos Andres' resignation to allow for "lasting" solutions until his dismissal in 1993. In March 1993, Attorney General Ramón Escovar Salom filed a request for a pre-trial of merit against President Andrés Pérez for the crime of "fraudulent embezzlement" and "malfeasance" of 250 million bolívares of a secret item for the management of which he was responsible. On 20 May 1993, the report requested by the Supreme Court of Justice to Chief Justice Gonzalo Rodríguez Corro was made public, declaring the request for a pre-trial on merit to be admissible. The following day, on 21 May, the National Congress authorized the trial, impeaching Carlos Andres from the presidency. During the trial it was revealed that the money had been used for international aid to President Violeta Chamorro in Nicaragua. The trial had several irregularities. In an article in the Diario de Caracas in 1993, it was pointed out that the investigation was flawed at the beginning, that its motivations were political, that the first decisions were dictated under pressure and that fundamental guarantees were disregarded.

Being interviewed by Venezuelan historian Agustín Blanco Muñoz in his book "Yo sigo acusando! Habla CAP", Carlos Andrés Pérez blames the group for his dismissal and declares that they were motivated by revenge for having removed them from power in 1945.

== See also ==
- Caracazo
- February 1992 Venezuelan coup attempt
- November 1992 Venezuelan coup attempt
- 1945 Venezuelan coup d'état
