= Vallenilla =

Vallenilla is a surname. Notable people with the surname include:

- Ernesto Mayz Vallenilla (1925–2015), Venezuelan philosopher
- Keydomar Vallenilla (born 1999), Venezuelan weightlifter
- Laureano Vallenilla Lanz (1870–1936), Venezuelan sociologist and politician
- Luis Vallenilla (born 1974), Venezuelan footballer
- Winston Vallenilla (born 1973), Venezuelan television presenter
