= February 1992 Venezuelan coup attempt =

Coup d'état attempt in Venezuela

February 1992 Venezuelan coup d'état attempt
- Part of the Bolivarian Revolution
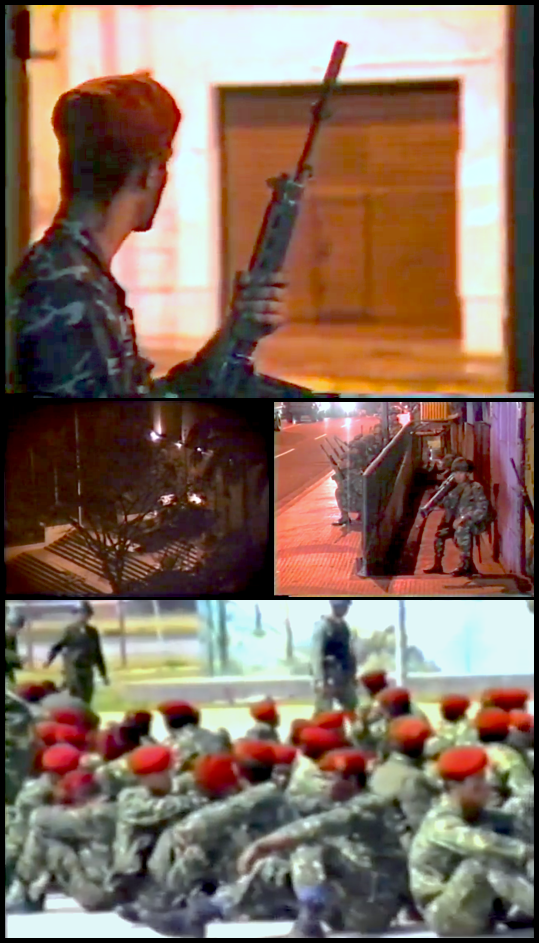
- Top to bottom, left to right: MBR-200 combatant seeking cover; an APC on the steps of Miraflores Palace; government loyalist troops deploying to combat MBR-200; and MBR-200 troops arrested following the coup attempt's failure
Date	4 February 1992
Location	Venezuela
Result	Failed to depose the Carlos Andrés Pérez government.: Hugo Chávez and participants arrested

Belligerents
(Venezuela) Venezuelan Government: Venezuelan Armed Forces	MBR-200; Cuba (alleged): DGI

Commanders and leaders
(Venezuela) Carlos Andrés Pérez (Venezuela) Gen. Fernando Antich	Hugo Chávez; Francisco Arias

Military support
Army loyalists	Military rebels

Casualties and losses
- 32 killed (officially) and 130 injured.

The Venezuelan coup attempt of February 1992 was an attempt to seize control of the government of Venezuela by the Hugo Chávez-led Revolutionary Bolivarian Movement-200 (MBR-200) that took place on 4 February 1992. The coup was directed against President Carlos Andrés Pérez and occurred in a period marked by economic liberalization reforms, which were attempted in order to decrease the country's level of indebtedness and had caused major protests and social unrest. Despite their failure to depose the government of Pérez, the February coup attempts brought Chávez into the national spotlight. It was followed by another coup attempt on November of that year.

== Background ==
Venezuela had enjoyed democratic stability since 1958, and also a degree of prosperity. This prosperity was greatly enhanced in the 1970s, when oil prices increased substantially, and Venezuela, a large petroleum exporter, received large revenues, which increased per capita income by about 40%. Venezuela experienced modernization and had one of the highest GDP per capita in its history, while also having an exchange rate of 4 bolivares per 1 US dollar.

However, in the 1980s, other oil producers (especially Saudi Arabia) raised their production, and oil prices dropped. Venezuela's oil revenues dropped substantially, and per capita income declined by about 25%. This imperiled economic and social stability in general. The government's overspending on programs caused massive levels of debt with poverty, inflation and unemployment rising while income declined. Corruption was also widespread with crime increasing yearly, making the Venezuelan public, primarily the poor who especially felt neglected, become outraged.

The IMF offered assistance to Venezuela with these debts, but on condition of Venezuela enacting budgetary and fiscal reforms to curtail the deficits. In 1989, President Pérez put these liberalization policies into effect, reducing social spending and many commodity subsidies, and removing longstanding price controls on many goods. These policies triggered unrest in Caracas which was met with a Government response. The resultant discontent erupted in the "Caracazo" beginning on 27 February 1989.

=== Origin ===
Many of the participants in the coups had been members of the Partido de la Revolución Venezolana (PRV) in the 1970s. The PRV was created by ex-Communist and guerrilla fighter Douglas Bravo, who after failing in an armed insurrection, sought to infiltrate the Venezuelan armed forces to reach power. Thus, preparation for the coup began more than ten years before Pérez was re-elected in 1988.

The coup organizers rejected the ruling bipartisanship in Venezuela between the two political parties, Democratic Action and COPEI, which they saw as a corrupt and clientelist establishment.

The Movimiento Bolivariano Revolucionario 200 (MBR-200) was founded in 1982 by Lieutenant Colonel Hugo Chávez Frías, who was later joined by Francisco Arias Cárdenas. They used the Venezuelan independence hero Simón Bolívar as their group's symbol. Their main complaint was the corruption of Carlos Andrés Pérez as well as Venezuela's ongoing economic difficulties and social turmoil. In the view of these two men, the entire political system had to be changed in order for social change to occur.

In February 1989 shortly before the Caracazo, Cuban president Fidel Castro allegedly placed sleeper agents in Venezuela to create unrest. With Cuba recently entering its Special Period and experiencing economic difficulties as a result of the Soviet Union's Perestroika, Castro allegedly sought to establish an ally in Venezuela so Cuba could also enjoy funds from oil profits. As the Revolutions of 1989 occurred in Soviet states, Castro had allegedly began to organize a coup in late 1989 that would indirectly use sleeper agents who participated in the Caracazo. Castro, who was allegedly one of the main organizers according to Venezuelan Major Orlando Madriz Benítez, would instead use Chávez as the face of a civil-military action in order to avoid retaliatory actions from the United States.

While officially unconfirmed, Cuban involvement in and facilitation of the coup attempts was alleged by multiple sources. CIA analyst Brian Latell suggested that the Cuban intelligence agency, the Dirección General de Inteligencia (DGI), may have utilized Chávez to fulfill Cuban strategic dominance of Venezuela and its oil reserves. In Latell's view, the DGI may have either hired Chávez as an agent or provided critical aid to his coup plots. Latell claims Cuba had previously engaged in efforts to destabilize Venezuela by aiding guerrillas in the 1960s. According to General Carlos Julio Peñaloza in his book El Delfín de Fidel, both Fidel Castro and the succeeding President of Venezuela, Rafael Caldera, knew of Chávez's coup plot. Castro allegedly provided agents to convince President Pérez that there was no threat of a coup. After the coup, Caldera, manipulated by Castro and Chávez, was then supposed to take power after Pérez was removed from the presidency.

== Coup attempts ==
=== February 1992 coup attempt ===
After an extended period of popular dissatisfaction and economic decline under administration of Carlos Andrés Pérez, Chávez made extensive preparations for a military-civilian coup d'état. Initially planned for December 1991, Chávez delayed the MBR-200 coup until the early twilight hours of 4 February 1992. Chávez at the time held the loyalty of some 10% of Venezuela's military forces. On that date, five army units under Chávez's command moved into urban Caracas to seize key military and communications installations throughout the city, including the presidential residence (Miraflores Palace), the defense ministry, La Carlota military airport, and the Military Museum. Chávez's ultimate goal was to intercept Pérez, take custody of him and allegedly execute him before he returned to Miraflores from an overseas trip, planning to capture the president at Maiquetia Airport.

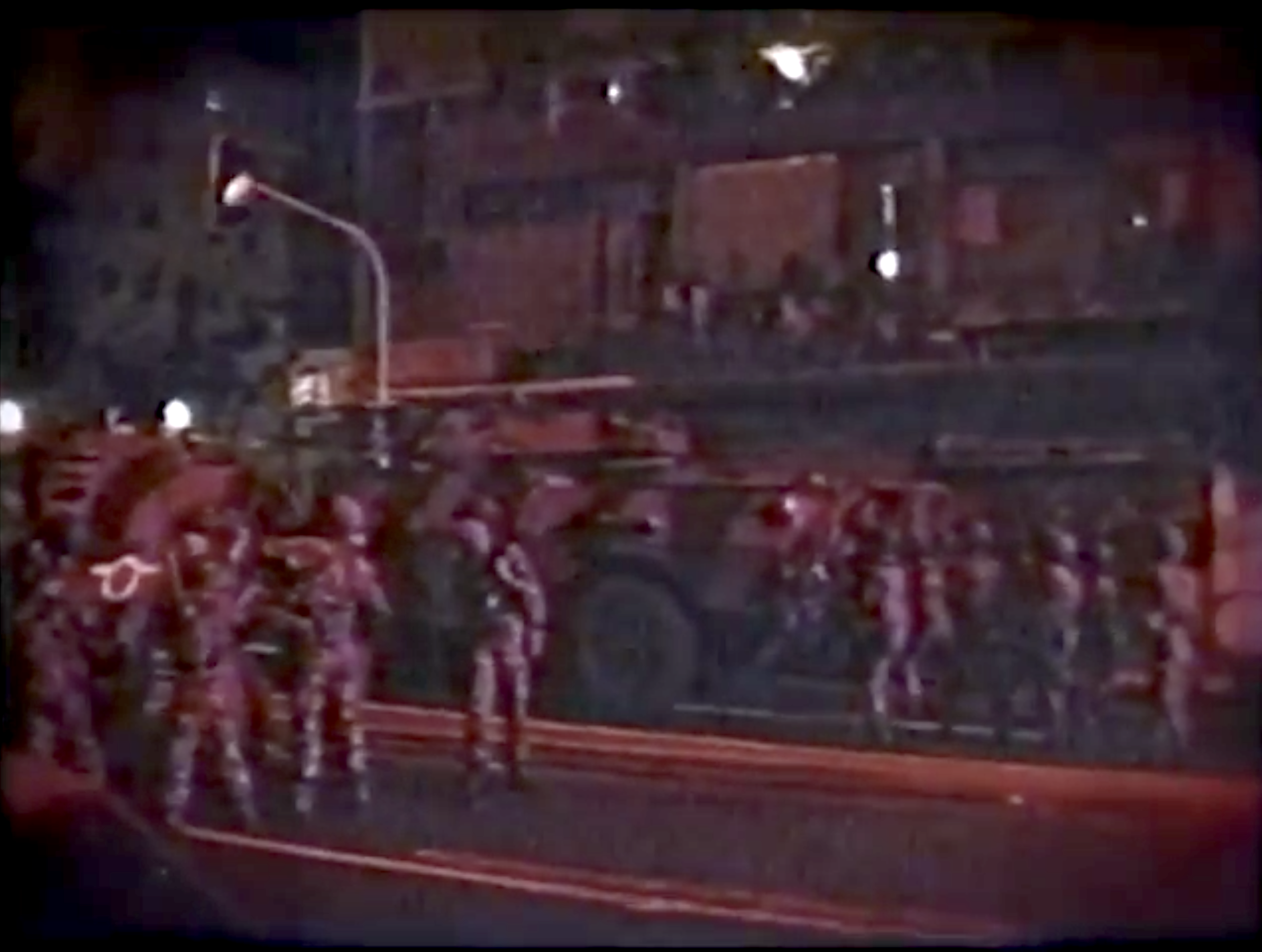
Troops in the street to help defend President Pérez

The coup attempt was originally supposed to be performed by Admiral Hernan Gruber Odreman, the highest-ranking officer among conspirators who was supposed to capture President Pérez when he returned to Venezuela from Davos, Switzerland. However, he refused after discovering that Rafael Caldera was to become head of the governing board following the coup. A second attempt to capture Pérez was then committed hours later by then Army captain, Miguel Rodríguez Torres. Since Pérez had knowledge of the coup, the president was then driven without the car lights on and his vehicle sped onto the highway. Torres, surprised, then ordered those under his command to fire at President Pérez's fleeing vehicle.

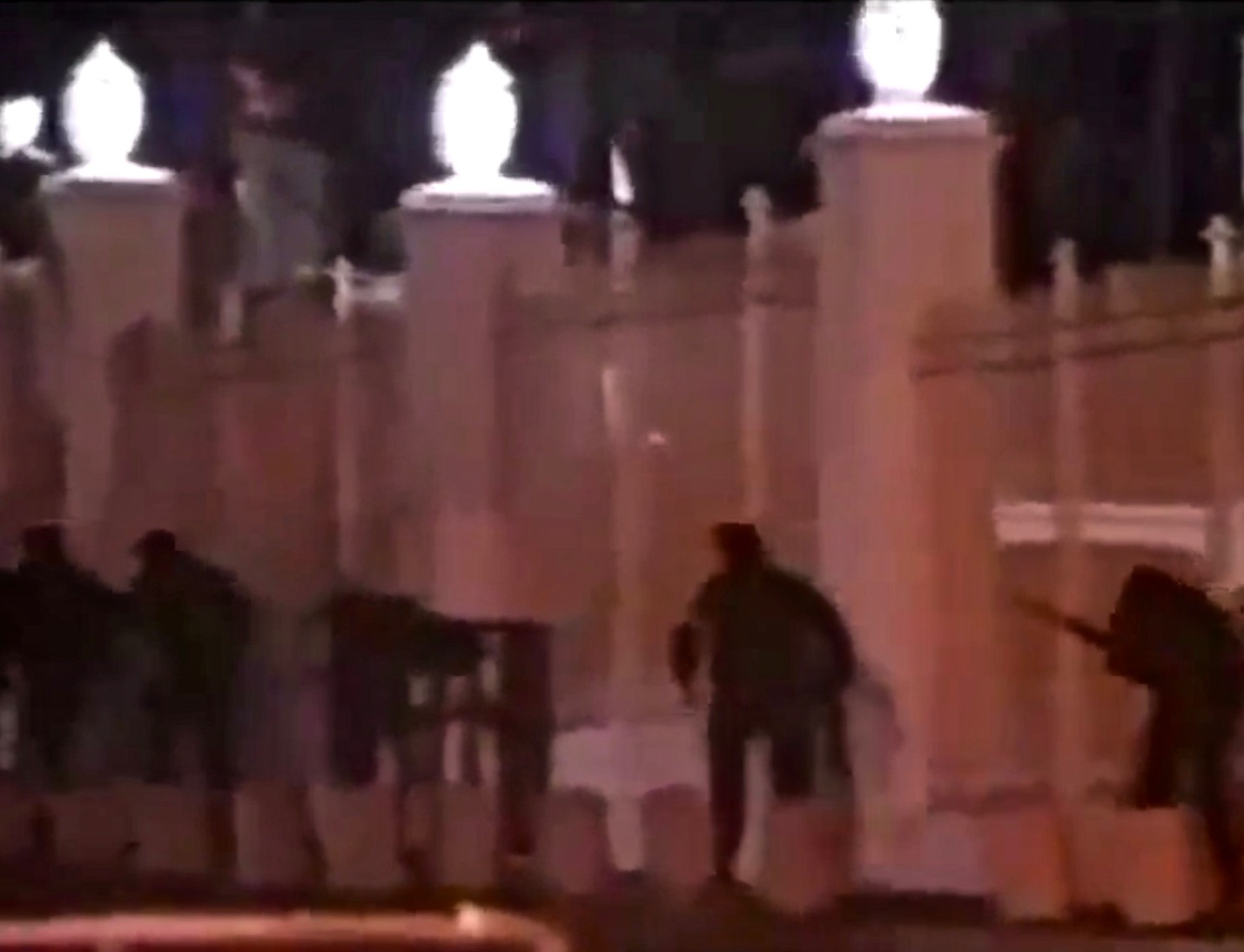
MBR-200 troops running outside of the walls of Miraflores Palace

The final attempt in the coup attempt occurred 30 minutes later at Miraflores Palace where insurgents attempted to besiege the palace and kill President Pérez. Those attempting to attack Miraflores were told that the doors would be opened by the palace guards that were supposedly part of the coup. However, when the attackers approached Miraflores in an armored vehicle, they were attacked by the palace guards who knew about the coup. The firefight then ended Chávez's attack and left three of Pérez's bodyguards dead while Pérez hid under an overcoat eluding capture. The president was then able to escape from the palace and then called General Ochoa saying, "No negotiations. Give them bullets. I want to be back in soon". Pérez then used a local TV station to rally the rest of the military against his aggressors. Chávez's allies were also unable to broadcast Chávez's pre-recorded call for a planned mass civilian uprising against Pérez.

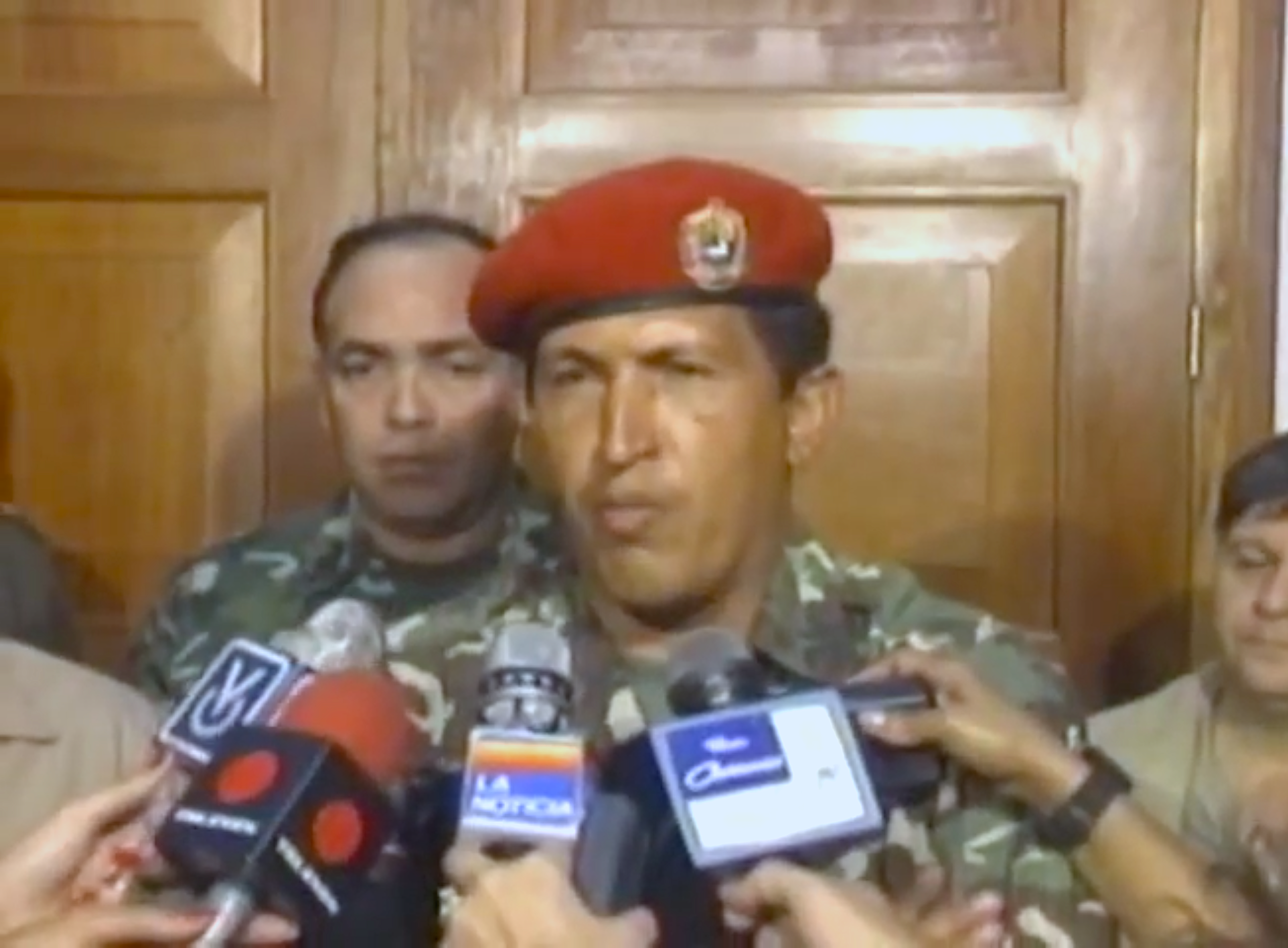
Chávez speaking to media outlets following his arrest

The betrayals, defections, errors, and other unforeseen circumstances left Chávez and only a small group of rebels completely cut off in the Military Museum, without any means of conveying orders to their collaborators. Nevertheless, rebel forces in other parts of Venezuela made swift advances and took control of such large cities as Valencia, Maracaibo, and Maracay with the help of spontaneous civilian aid. Chávez's forces, however, had failed to take Caracas since he remained inside the Military Museum. Chávez soon gave himself up to the government. He was then allowed to appear on national television to call for all remaining rebel detachments in Venezuela to cease hostilities. When he did so, Chávez famously quipped on national television that he had only failed "por ahora" ("for now"):

Comrades: Unfortunately, for the moment, the objectives that we had set for ourselves have not been achieved in the capital. That's to say that those of us here in Caracas have not been able to seize power. Where you are, you have performed well, but now is the time for a rethink; new possibilities will arise again, and the country will be able to move definitively toward a better future.

In the ensuing violence, 18 soldiers were killed while 51 soldiers were injured, while the majority of those killed during the coup were civilians, with 49 killed and about 80 injured in the crossfire.

Despite Chávez's military failure, he was immediately catapulted into the national spotlight due to his action, with many poor Venezuelans seeing him as a figure who had stood up against government corruption and kleptocracy. Afterward, Chávez was imprisoned at the San Carlos military stockade.

=== November 1992 coup attempt ===
On 27 November 1992, a second coup attempt was launched. It was led by officers from the air force and navy, including pilot Luis Reyes Reyes. The group had contacts with Chávez in prison and had learned some lessons from the February coup's errors, including launching at 4:30 am instead of midnight, and obtaining communications equipment to ensure they would not be stranded without it.

== Government response ==
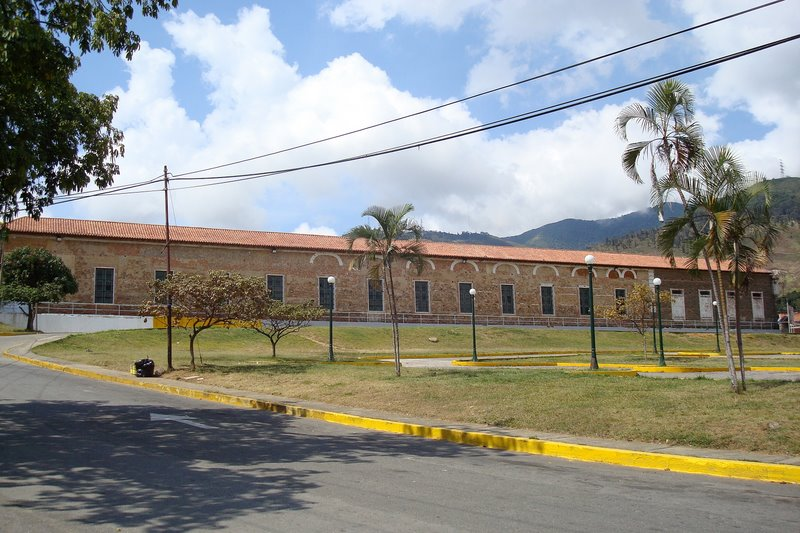
The San Carlos military stockade, where Hugo Chávez was held after attempting a coup-d'état in 1992

In the process of resisting the coup attempts, government agents were reported to have killed 40 people, both civilians and surrendered rebels, either as extrajudicial executions or with disproportionate force. Arbitrary detentions numbered in the hundreds, continued for some time after the events, and included student leaders and other civic leaders not connected with the coup attempts. In addition, freedom of expression was suspended for two months in the February case and three weeks in the November case, with censorship of the media. A series of demonstrations in March/April calling for the resignation of President Pérez and the restoration of constitutional guarantees were met with state violence, including indiscriminate police firing into crowds, with a total of thirteen deaths. A number of members of the press covering the protests were severely injured by police.

Participants in the February coup attempt were tried under the regular military justice system. But in response to the November coup attempt, the government created ad hoc courts based on the 1938 legal code of Eleazar López Contreras, drawn up twenty years before the transition to democracy. The Supreme Court ultimately ruled the courts unconstitutional but not on the due process grounds for which they were criticised. The Court instead found that the President had neglected to suspend the relevant constitutional rights (right to a defense, right to be tried by one's natural judge).

== Aftermath ==
With Pérez's growing unpopularity due to liberalization reforms and the coup attempts, the bipartisanship system in the country weakened. The turmoil and failed coups were used by former president Rafael Caldera, who according to some versions was supposed to take power following the coup. Caldera commented on the gradual deterioration of Venezuelan democracy and the conflation of poverty and corruption in the nation. Subsequent actions by intellectuals associated with Caldera resulted in Pérez's ousting from the presidency on 20 May 1993, on charges of corruption. Swift political maneuvering allowed Caldera to win the 1993 presidential election with a heterogeneous and non-traditional group of small independent political parties, named "National Convergence". As part of his campaign Caldera promised to pardon the coup plotters and later did so, which allowed Hugo Chávez to participate in (and win) the 1998 presidential election.

Some coup leaders later dominated the political scenario in Venezuela, most notable case was the 2000 presidential election, in which Zulia governor and Radical Cause leader, Francisco Arias Cárdenas, commandant in Maracaibo during thr February coup attempt, was the opposition candidate, challenging president Chávez who sought re-election. Both Cárdenas and Chávez monopolized 97% of all votes cast.

=== Reactions ===
==== Media ====
In December 1992, the Los Angeles Times focused on the possible causes of the attempted coups in Venezuela, noting the recession in Latin America and corruption in the government. The Los Angeles Times stated that the coup attempts could also be the efforts of corrupt Venezuelan officers seeking take over the government and make money from drugs.

==== International reactions ====
The coup attempts were condemned by the governments of:

- Brazil
- Cuba
- European Community
- Mexico
- Organization of American States
- United States

== See also ==
- Night of the Tanks
- Los Notables

== Bibliography ==
- Márquez, Laureano; Sanabria, Eduardo (2018). Historieta de Venezuela: De Macuro a Maduro (1st ed.). Gráficas Pedrazas. ISBN 978-1-7328777-1-9.
- Sylvia, Ronald D.; Danopoulos, Constantine P.; Danopoulos, C. P. (2003). "The Chávez Phenomenon: Political Change in Venezuela". Third World Quarterly. 24 (1): 63–76. doi:10.1080/713701367. JSTOR 3993630. S2CID 154551869.
