= Correo de Carmelitas =

Building in Caracas, Venezuela

Coordinates: 10°30′28″N 66°54′58″W

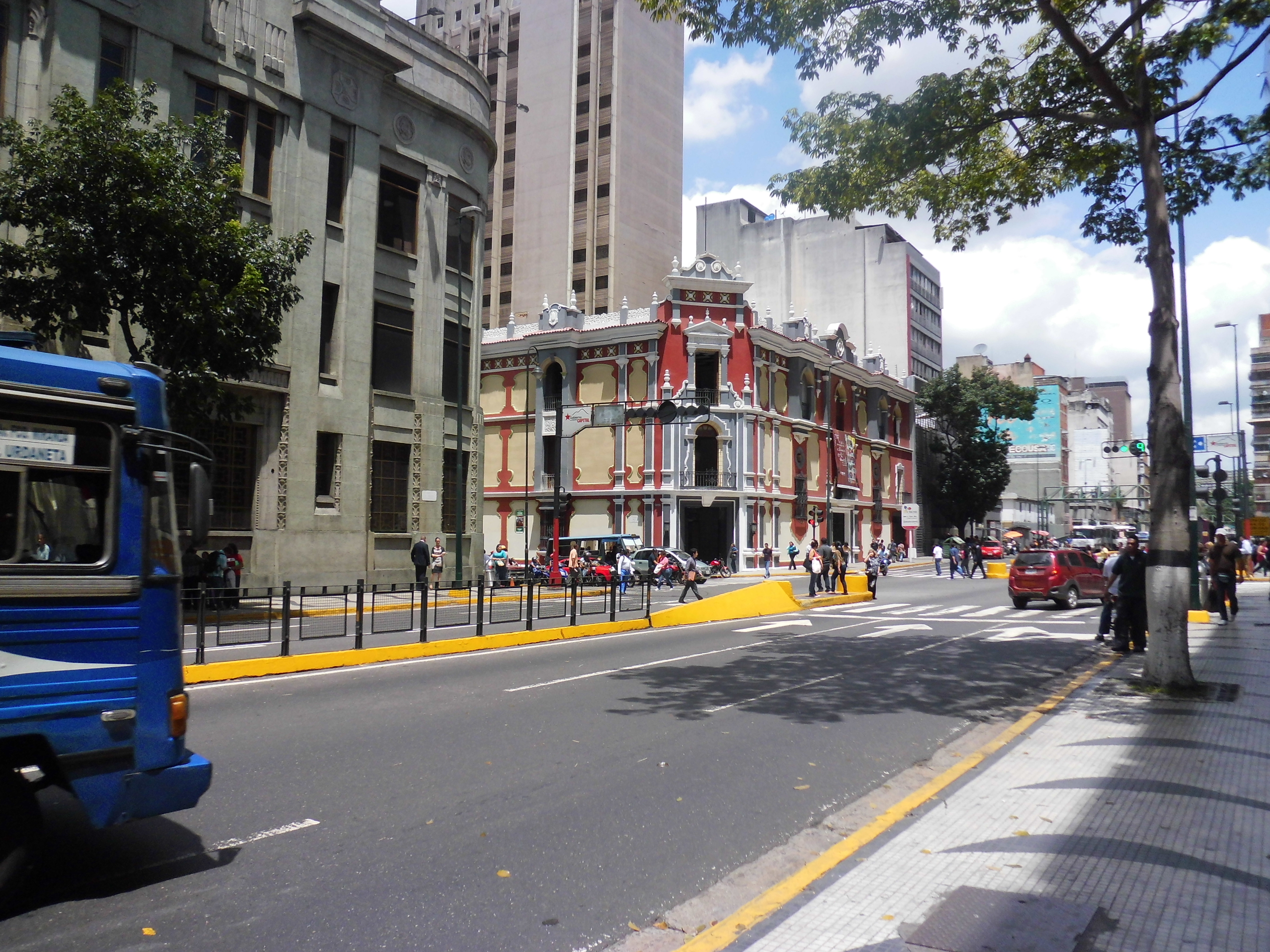
Correo de Carmelitas

Correo de Carmelitas (Carmelites Post Office) is a colonial building in Caracas, Venezuela, located in the historic center of the city on the corner of Avenida Urdaneta and Carmelitas street. It is located in the Cathedral Parish of the Libertador Bolivarian Municipality.

The construction of the house dates back to 1781. At the time it was the property of Count Martin de Tovar. Among the most notable visitors are Alexander von Humboldt and Aimé Bonpland in 1799 and Simon Bolivar in 1827. It was the presidential residence between 1860 and 1861, when the great-grandson of the original owner, Manuel Felipe de Tovar, was president of Venezuela. Thereafter the building was used as headquarters of the Ministry of War and Navy. In 1932 the structure of the house was almost completely modified including a new Gothic facade, doors, windows and third floor while retaining original features such as some walls and stone staircase. After the reconstruction, the building housed the headquarters of the Post Office of Caracas. In 1984 it was declared a National Historic Landmark.

== Gallery ==
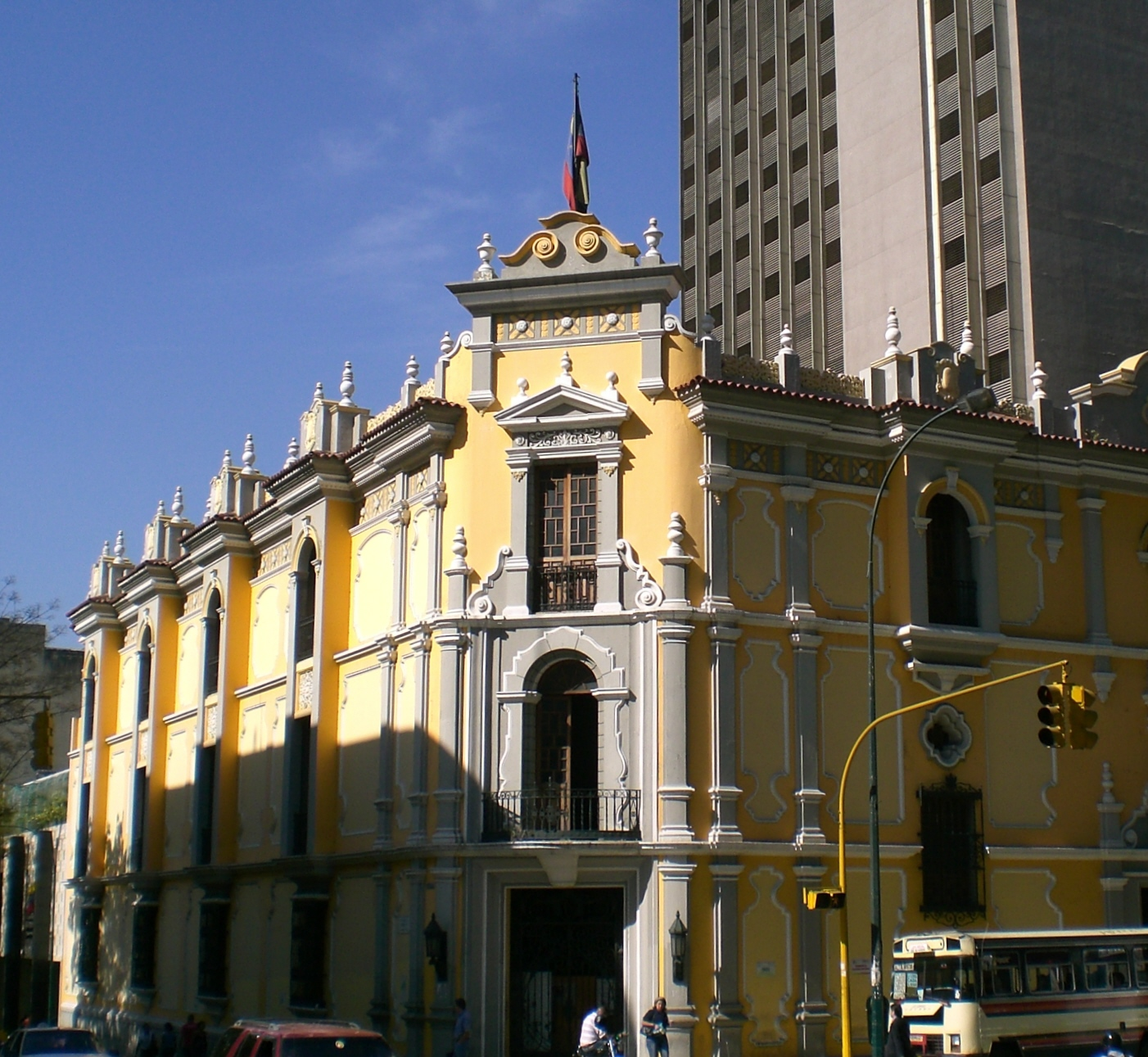
Correo de Carmelitas in 2008

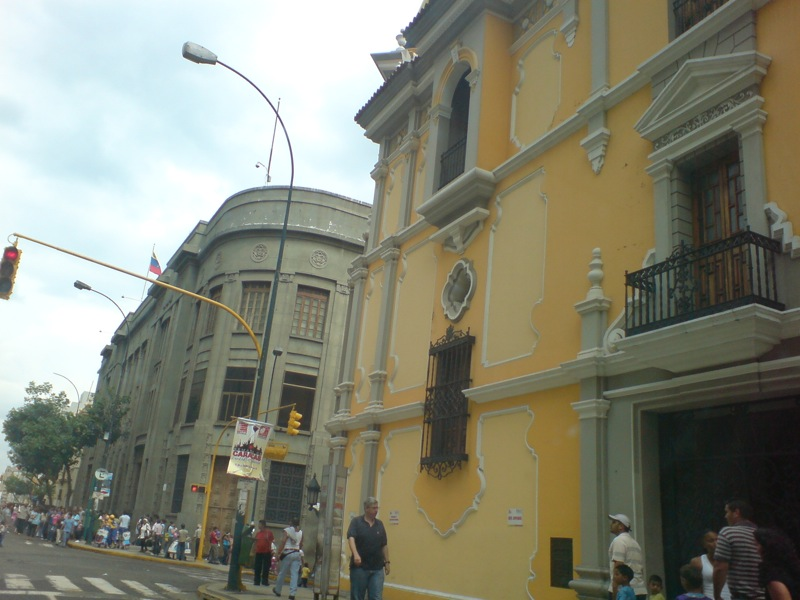
Correo de Carmelitas in 2008

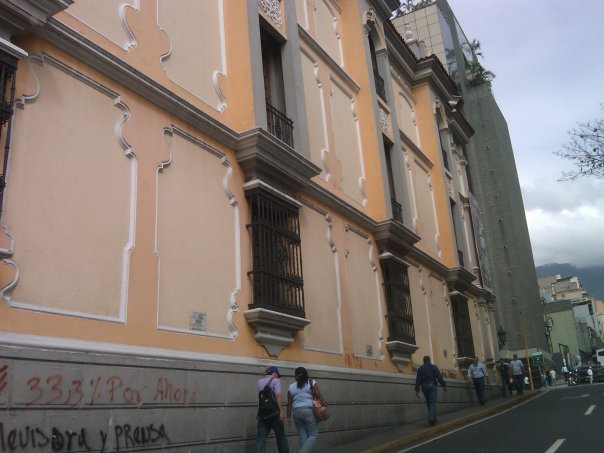
Correo de Carmelitas in 2010

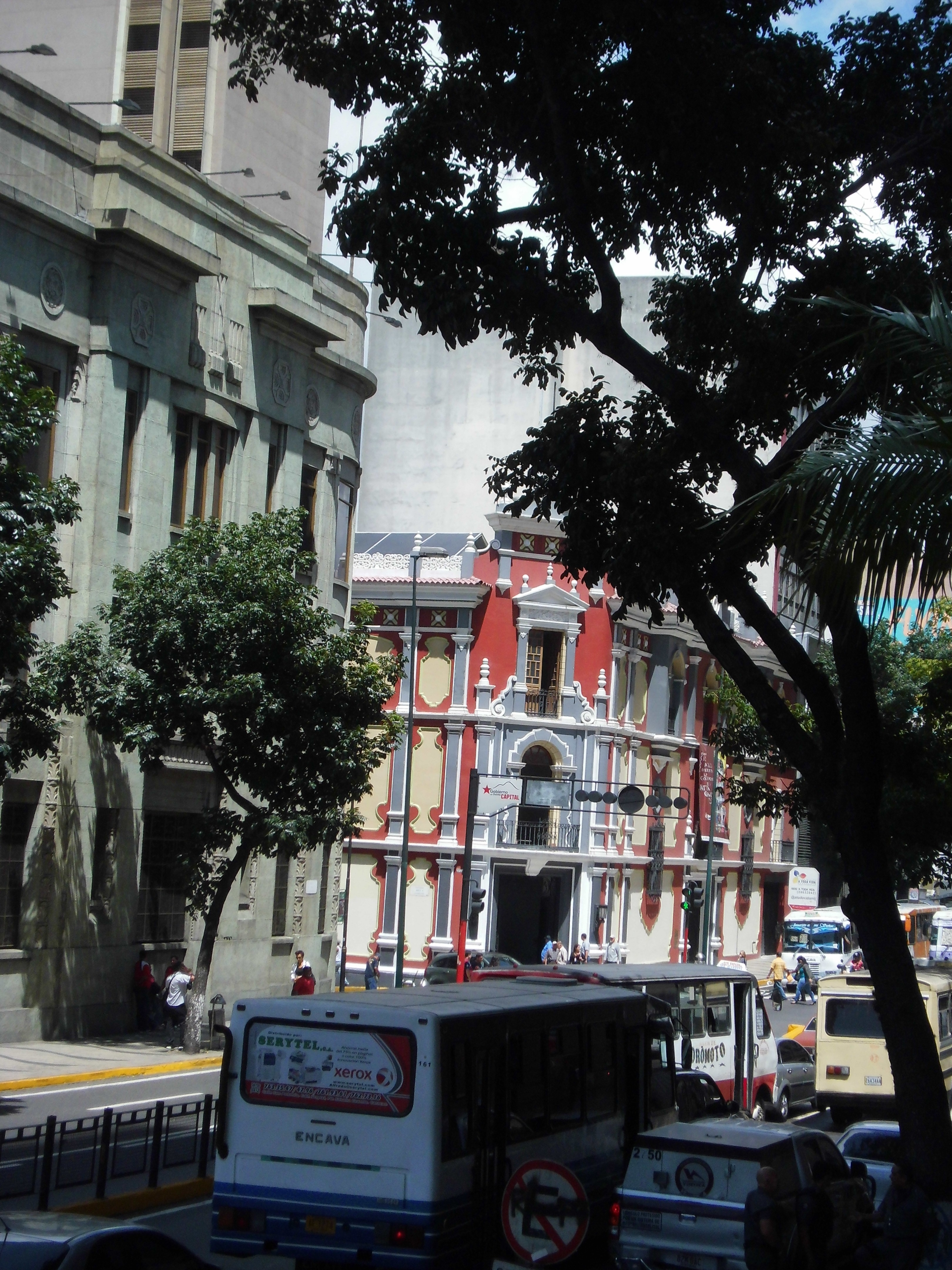
Correo de Carmelitas 2013

== See also ==
- Postage stamps and postal history of Venezuela
