= Ernesto Mayz Vallenilla =

Venezuelan philosopher (1925–2015)

Ernesto Mayz Vallenilla (September 3, 1925 in Maracaibo, Venezuela – December 21, 2015) was a Venezuelan philosopher.

== Biography ==
Vallenilla graduated from Liceo Andrés Bello High School in Caracas. He graduated with degrees in philosophy and literature from Universidad Central de Venezuela in 1950, where he also obtained his PhD in Philosophy. He also studied at universities in Göttingen, Freiburg, and Munich, Germany.

Vallenilla was a professor at the Universidad Central de Venezuela, and the rector-founder of Universidad Simón Bolívar. He is best known for his theories on technical reasoning, published in 1974. In 2001, the Argentinian Philosophical Society named Vallenilla the most outstanding Latin American philosopher of the 20th century. Vallenilla also held the UNESCO Chair of Philosophy.

== Works ==
- La idea de la estructura psíquica en Dilthey. Caracas: Universidad Central de Venezuela, 1949.
- Formas e ideales de la enseñanza universitaria en Alemania. Caracas: Asociación Cultural Humboldt, 1953.
- Síntomas de crisis en la ciencia contemporánea. Caracas: Universidad Central de Venezuela, 1954.
- Examen de nuestra conciencia cultural. Caracas: Universidad Central de Venezuela, 1955.
- La enseñanza de la filosofía en Venezuela. Caracas: Universidad Central de Venezuela, 1955.
- Fenomenología del Conocimiento (Tesis Doctoral). Caracas: Universidad Central de Venezuela, 1956. Caracas: Equinoccio (Universidad Simón Bolívar), 1976.
- Universidad, ciencia y técnica. Caracas: Universidad Central de Venezuela, 1956.
- De las generaciones. Caracas: Imprenta Vargas, 1957.
- Universidad y humanismo. Caracas: Imprenta Vargas, 1957.
- El problema de América (Apuntes para una filosofía americana). Caracas: Universidad Central de Venezuela, 1957.
- Universidad, pueblo y saber. Caracas: Universidad Central de Venezuela, 1958.
- El problema de América. Caracas: Universidad Central de Venezuela, 1959. Caracas: Universidad Central de Venezuela, 1969. Caracas: Equinoccio (Universidad Simón Bolívar), 1992.
- La formación del profesorado universitario. Mérida: Universidad de Los Andes, 1959.
- Ontología del Conocimiento. Caracas: Universidad Central de Venezuela, 1960.
- El problema de la Nada en Kant. Madrid: Editorial Revista de Occidente, 1965. Caracas: Monte Ávila Editores Latinoamericana, 1992. (in German Pfüllingen: Verlag Günther Neske, 1974). In French (Paris: L’Harmattan, 2000).
- Del hombre y su alienación. Caracas: Instituto Nacional de Cultura y Bellas Artes, 1966. Caracas: Monte Ávila Editores, 1969.
- De la universidad y su teoría. Caracas: Universidad Central de Venezuela, 1967.
- Diagnóstico de la universidad. Caracas: Editorial Arte, 1968.
- Universität und Menschenbild. Dortmund: Departamento de Sociología de la Universidad de Münster, 1968.
- Sentidos y objetivos de la enseñanza superior. Caracas: Universidad Central de Venezuela, 1970.
- La crisis universitaria y nuestro tiempo. Caracas: Universidad Central de Venezuela, 1970.
- Hacia un nuevo humanismo. Caracas: Universidad Católica Andrés Bello, 1970.
- Arquetipos e ideales de la educación. Caracas: Universidad Simón Bolívar, 1971.
- La universidad y el futuro. Caracas: Universidad Simón Bolívar, 1972.
- La universidad en el mundo tecnológico. Caracas: Universidad Simón Bolívar, 1972.
- Técnica y humanismo. Caracas: Universidad Simón Bolívar, 1972.
- Examen de la universidad. Caracas: Universidad Simón Bolívar, 1973.
- Esbozo de una crítica de la Razón Técnica. Caracas: Equinoccio (Universidad Simón Bolívar), 1974.
- Mensaje del Rector a la Primera Promoción. Caracas: Universidad Simón Bolívar, 1974.
- La pregunta por el hombre. Caracas: Universidad Simón Bolívar, 1974.
- Hombre y naturaleza. Caracas: Universidad Simón Bolívar, 1975.
- Misión de la universidad latinoamericana. Caracas: Universidad Simón Bolívar, 1976.
- Latinoamérica en la encrucijada de la técnica. Caracas: Universidad Simón Bolívar, 1976.
- ¿Es el poder del hombre i-limitado? Caracas: Universidad Simón Bolívar, 1977.
- Técnica y libertad. Caracas: Universidad Simón Bolívar, 1978.
- Democracia y tecnocracia. Caracas: Universidad Simón Bolívar, 1979.
- El dominio del poder. Barcelona: Ariel, 1982. San Juan de Puerto Rico: Universidad de Puerto Rico, 1999.
- Ratio Technica. Caracas: Monte Ávila Editores, 1983.
- El ocaso de las universidades. Caracas: Monte Ávila Editores, 1984. Caracas: Monte Ávila Editores, 1991. Caracas: Universidad Simón Bolívar/Cátedra Unesco de Filosofía, 2001. In Italian (Naples: Istituto per gli Studi Filosofici, 1996).
- El sueño del futuro. Caracas: Editorial Ateneo de Caracas, 1984. Caracas: Equinoccio (Universidad Simón Bolívar), 1989. Caracas: Equinoccio (Universidad Simón Bolívar), 1993.
- Pasión y rigor de una utopía. Caracas: Equinoccio (Universidad Simón Bolívar), 1989. Caracas: Equinoccio (Universidad Simón Bolívar), 2000.
- Fundamentos de la meta-técnica. Caracas: Monte Ávila Editores, 1990. Barcelona: Gedisa, 1993. In Italian Naples: Istituto per gli Studi Filosofici, 1994. In French Paris: L’Harmattan, 1997. In German Berlin: Verlag Peter Lang, 2002. In Portuguese Lisboa: Edições Colibri, 2004. In English, translated by Carl Mitcham, University Press of America, 2004. ISBN 0-7618-2905-9.
- Abismo y caos. Caracas: Universidad Simón Bolívar, 1991.
- Invitación al pensar del siglo XXI. Caracas: Monte Ávila Editores Latinoamericana, 1998.
- Travesías del pensar. Caracas: IESALC-URSHLAC/Cátedra UNESCO de Filosofía, 1999.

== See also ==
- Los Notables
