= Bolivarian Continental Movement =

The Bolivarian Continental Movement (Spanish: Movimiento Continental Bolivariano) is a political movement named after South American independence hero Simón Bolívar. The political movement was founded in Caracas, Venezuela on December 8, 2009, by a group of 950 left-wing activists from 26 Latin American nations.

The movement claims to seek to advance the interests of workers and fight against imperialism.

Colombian president Álvaro Uribe condemned the new group accusing it of justifying terrorism for reading a statement from Alfonso Cano, commander of the Revolutionary Armed Forces of Colombia (FARC), during its opening session.
