= Revolutionary Bolivarian Movement-200 =

Venezuelan sociopolitical movement (1982–1997)

Revolutionary Bolivarian Movement-200 Movimiento Bolivariano Revolucionario 200
- Abbreviation: MBR-200
- Leader: Hugo Chavez
- Founded: 17 December 1982
- Dissolved: July 1997
- Succeeded by: Fifth Republic Movement (political branch); Bolivarian Circles (militant branch)
- Ideology: Revolutionary socialism Fidelismo; Bolivarianism; Left-wing nationalism Liberation Theology
- Political position: Left-wing to far-left

The Revolutionary Bolivarian Movement-200 (Movimiento Bolivariano Revolucionario 200 or MBR-200) was the political and social movement that the later Venezuelan president Hugo Chávez founded in 1982. It planned and executed the February 4, 1992 attempted coup. The movement evolved into the Movement for the Fifth Republic (MVR), set up in July 1997 to support Hugo Chávez's candidacy in the 1998 Venezuelan presidential election.

== Foundation ==
The movement's first members were Chávez and his fellow military officers Felipe Acosta Carlez and Jesús Urdaneta Hernández. On 17 December 1982, as Chávez biographer Richard Gott reports,

The three revolutionary officers swore an oath underneath the great tree at Samán de Güere, near Maracay, repeating the words of the pledge that Simón Bolívar had made in Rome in 1805, when he swore to devote his life to the liberation of Venezuela from Spanish yoke: "I swear before you, and I swear before the God of my fathers, that I will not allow my arm to relax, nor my soul to rest, until I have broken the chains that oppress us..."

Gott further explains that the suffix "200" was added to the group's name the following year, in 1983, on the 200th anniversary of South American liberator Simon Bolívar's birth.

The movement began "more as a political study circle than as a subversive conspiracy," but soon its members "began thinking in terms of some kind of coup d'état." Chávez and his friends soon recruited more members, including Francisco Arias Cárdenas, in March 1985.

== History ==
=== February 1992 coup attempt ===
Weeks after the Caracazo, Chávez returned to work at Miraflores. Chávez recalled that the presidential palace's guards stopped and questioned him. They reportedly asked him: "[l]ook here, major, is it true about the Bolivarian Movement? We'd like to hear more about it; we're not prepared to go on killing people". Chávez took this as a sign that his plan to overthrow the government was gaining momentum. By late 1989, the first civilians joined the EBR-200's ranks. The EBR-200 thus changed its name to the Movimiento Bolivariano Revolucionario-200 (MBR-200—the "Revolutionary Bolivarian Movement-200"). The supplanting of the word "Army" (Ejército) with "Movement" (Movimiento) was intended to punctuate this shift. However, on 6 December 1989, Chávez along with other senior officers were abruptly arrested. They were brought before army command on charges of plotting a coup that was suspected by the government as planned for Christmas Day. They were accused of planning the assassination of high government officials, including President Pérez. Yet the officers were eventually released—due to lack of evidence. The government was reluctant to prosecute officers who were recognized in the military as among the best in their respective armed services. Nevertheless, all—including Chávez—were thereafter sent to posts far from the federal government in Caracas. Chávez was sent in 1990 to Maturín, where he was appointed the official in charge of civilian matters with the Ranger Brigade headquartered in the area. Chávez was later allowed to matriculate at the Universidad Simón Bolívar ("Simón Bolívar University") in Caracas, where he did graduate work in political science. He left without a degree. Chávez took courses until August 1991.

Chávez re-entered military service with an initial re-posting to Cumaná, where a desk job awaited him. Chávez recalled feeling that such a seemingly dull and minor posting was beneath him. Thereafter, from 1991 to 4 February 1992, Chávez was again given his own command—the Maracay-based Colonel Antonio Nicolas Briceño 421st Airborne Battalion, 42nd Airborne Brigade, of the Venezuelan Army's 4th Armored Division (then the 4th Infantry Division). Such troops proved key in facilitating Chávez's various political ambitions. Chávez received the job when the battalion's former commander retired from the army; Chávez was his replacement as commanding officer. With a posting in Maracay, a city that is relatively near the national power structures in Caracas, Chávez's coup plans were no longer hindered by his own geographic isolation. Later, reports emerged of a dossier detailing all of Chávez's subversive activities. It had been produced just prior to Chávez's new Maracay posting—yet, the document was ignored by military intelligence. The major who had compiled it was ordered to undergo psychiatric evaluation.

By 1991, Chávez and other MBR-200 leaders activated the coup plan codenamed after one of Chávez's heroes, Ezequiel Zamora—Plan Zamora. Yet despite planning for the coup's execution, Chávez and other MBR-200 leaders made precious little plans about what their putative future rebel government would do after the rebellion. Their future governing structure thus remained vague until the end of 1991, when Chávez and others decided to delineate an initial legal framework for their government's operation. Several assorted coup dates were proposed by Chávez's associates. Indeed, many junior captains threatened to launch their own early coup, which would be independent of that waged by their higher ranked commanders. They threatened this action if Chávez refused to pick a date that they considered soon enough. Yet Chávez refused to budge on a December 1991 attempt. He stated that nothing was to be attempted without his involvement. The captains thus waited for Chávez's chosen date. Yet one aspect of the planned coup remained clear throughout: Chávez's demand that it maintain a primarily military focus and character. The leftist ex-guerrilla leader Douglas Bravo—who fought in the 1960s and 1970s—also regularly met Chávez. These meetings took place during the years leading up to the coup and without the knowledge of other key MBR-200 officers. Bravo recounted that Chávez did not trust civilians enough to afford them a role in his bloody intrigue. According to him, it was for this reason that what was initially planned as a civilian-military rebellion was pared down by Chávez to one fought solely by soldiers; Bravo and his leftist civilian cohorts were turfed out of logistical considerations, preparations, and planning just days before the coup.

Yet, towards the end of January 1992, Chávez realized that the Movement's window of opportunity was to close. Chávez received notification that he faced imminent transferral on 14 February—to a small village on the frontier with war-ravaged Colombia. Chávez realized that this posting would jeopardize his participation in the MBR-200 coup, as the town was far from the major cities and power centers of Venezuela's northern coastal strip. Alarmed at this prospect, Chávez and other Movement members held one final meeting. There, they determined to act before Chávez's transfer. They would quicken preparations and wait until President Pérez—who was just then abroad on a trip to the 1992 World Economic Forum, held in Switzerland—returned to Venezuela. All the while, MBR-200 rebel forces built up their numbers. Eventually, 5 lieutenant colonels, 14 majors, 54 captains, 67 first and second lieutenants, 65 warrant officers and technical non-commissioned personnel, 101 sergeants and senior non-commissioned officers and 2,056 corporals and enlisted servicemen were involved in the conspiracy; thus Chávez and other rebel commanders had 2,367 military personnel from 10 army battalions to rely upon. They set a final date for their coup: Tuesday, 4 February 1992.

=== Chávez' participation in the 1998 election ===
In the early years after his release, Chávez considered the possibility of another coup attempt, but with the prospects appearing slim, some advisers, notably Luis Miquilena, urged him to reconsider his scepticism of the elections. In July 1997 Chávez registered the new Fifth Republic Movement with the National Electoral Council.

=== Continuation of the movement ===
In 2001, Chávez accused the Fifth Republic Movement of bureaucratization under Luis Miquilena and proposed the re-launching of the original MBR-200. This would eventually lead to the consolidation of his movement under the United Socialist Party of Venezuela label in 2007.
