= Douglas Bravo =

Venezuelan politician (1932–2021)

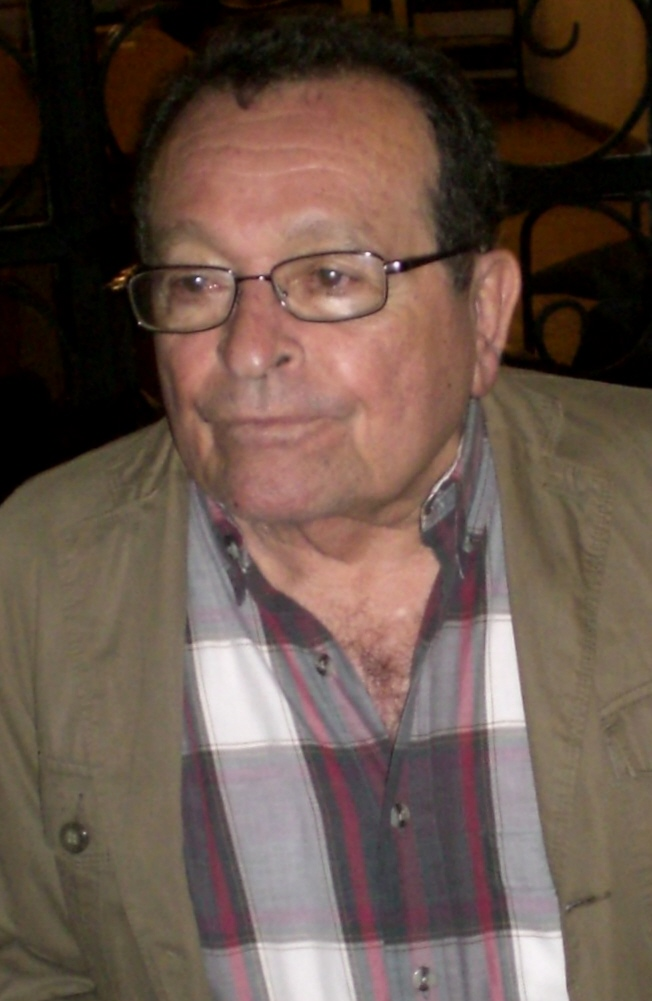

Douglas Ignacio Bravo Mora (11 March 1932 – 31 January 2021) was a Venezuelan politician and guerrilla fighter.

== Biography ==
A native of the village of Cabure in Falcón, he became involved in the Communist Party of Venezuela (PCV) at an early age, establishing a party youth group in his home village in 1946. He took a key role in trade union agitation, actively supporting strikes by oil workers in 1950 and students in 1952, being imprisoned briefly on both occasions. He enrolled at University of Zulia in 1953.

Involved in agitation against the regime of Marcos Pérez Jiménez, Bravo played a role in planning the 1958 coup d'etat that ousted the dictator. Emerging as the leader of the militant tendency of the PCV, he encouraged the party to resist the government of Rómulo Betancourt and decamped to the hills to organise armed guerrilla resistance. He was arrested in 1961 but escaped custody the following year, establishing in his home state the José Leonardo Chirino Front along the lines of the movement that had successfully taken control in Cuba.

Before long he became a key figure in the Fuerzas Armadas de Liberación Nacional (FALN) ("Armed Forces of National Liberation"), although this put him on a collision course with the PCV, which was moving away from armed insurgency. Bravo secured the support of Fidel Castro for his activity but this was not enough and he was expelled from the Communist Party in 1967. In 1969 the Copei offered an amnesty deal and as a result many guerrillas gave up violence, although Bravo and a small band of followers continued their insurgency until September 1979 when he accepted the offer of a second amnesty. He was later exiled to France, but returned.

Bravo turned to party politics in the early 1980s by establishing the Partido de la Revolución Venezolana (PRV) (Party of Venezuelan Revolution). Bravo was a fervent anti-imperialist. He had contacts with Che Guevara, and was ideologically opposed to the policies of the Soviet Union.

As part of his plan to foment a successful revolution in Venezuela, Bravo recruited military officers sympathetic to his cause within the ranks of the Army. One such officer was a young Hugo Chávez, whom Bravo met in 1980 in Mérida through his brother, Adán Chávez. Chávez later became the President of Venezuela through free democratic elections, which Bravo rejected for not being "revolutionary" enough.

Bravo participated in the 1992 Venezuelan coup d'état attempts, and was arrested; he was pardoned the following year.

Bravo was the leader of the Third Road Movement, which criticized the Chávez administration for its reliance on energy companies from rich industrialized countries.

He died of COVID-19 in 2021 at the age of 88, in Coro, Venezuela, during the COVID-19 pandemic in Venezuela.

== See also ==
- List of Venezuelans
