= Early life of Hugo Chávez =

Hugo Chávez
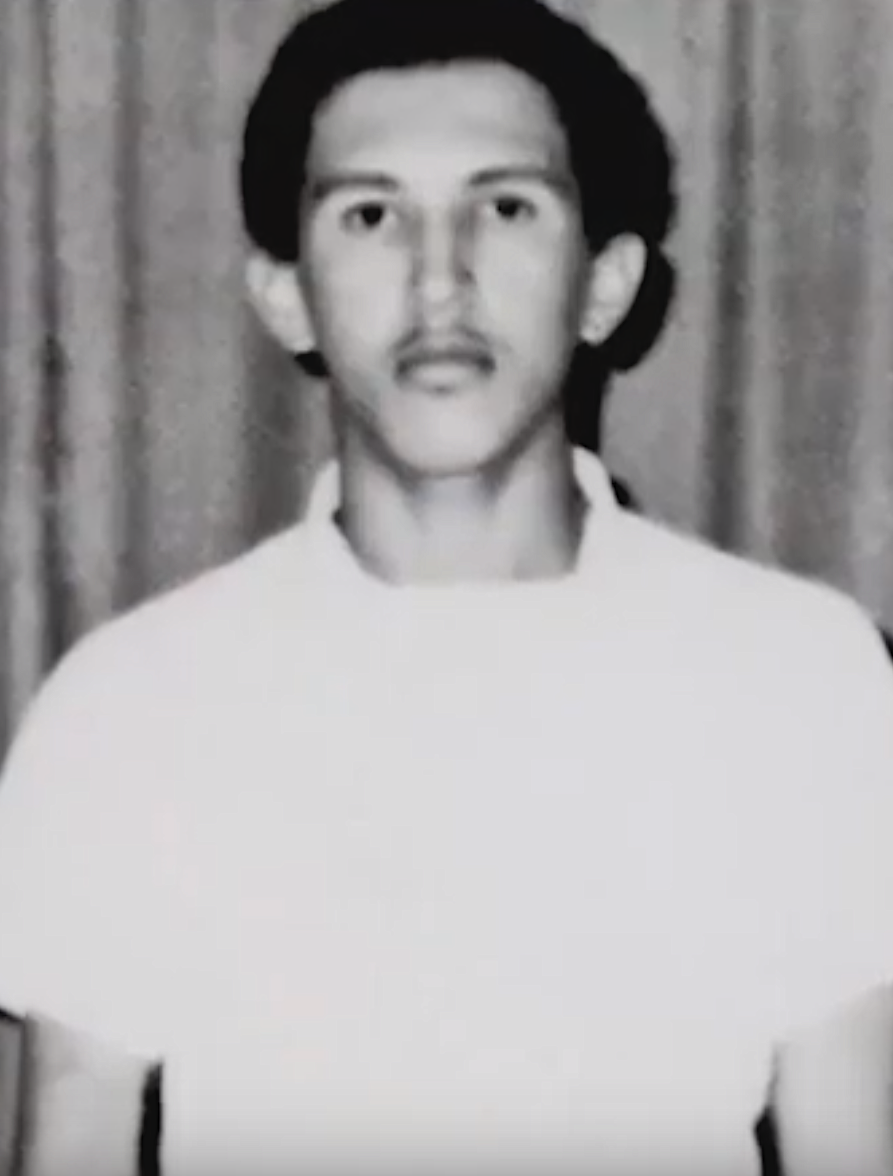
- Chávez as an adolescent
- Born: Hugo Rafael Chávez Frías; 28 July 1954; Sabaneta, Venezuela
- Died: 5 March 2013 (aged 58); Caracas, Venezuela
- Family: Pedro Pérez Delgado (great grandfather); Adán Chávez (brother); Aníbal José Chávez Frías (brother); Argenis Chávez (brother); Asdrúbal Chávez (cousin)

The early life of Hugo Chávez spans the first twenty-one years (1954–1975) of the former President of Venezuela's life. Leader of the "Bolivarian Revolution", Hugo Chávez is known for his socialist governance, his promotion of Latin American integration, and his radical critique of neoliberal globalization and United States foreign policy.

Born on 28 July 1954 in rural Sabaneta, Chávez was raised in a poor family in the rural llanos (plains) region of the Venezuelan interior. Chávez later lived with his grandmother and rose through school to obtain entry into the Venezuelan Academy of Military Sciences as a cadet. In his college years, Chávez began associating with leftists and gained exposure to various Latin American populist leaders—including Juan Velasco Alvarado and Omar Torrijos. Meanwhile, he developed a critical perspective on Latin America's socio-political context. These influences led Chávez to incorporate both nationalist and socialist elements in a new political ideology that he would dub "Bolivarianism". These would all come to bear upon Chávez's thinking, eventually stoking plans for a 1992 coup d'état, seeking the overthrow of Venezuela's government.

== Family and ancestry ==
The second son of Hugo de los Reyes Chávez (1932-2024) and Elena Frías de Chávez (born 1934), Chávez was born in the town of Sabaneta, Barinas on 28 July 1954. Sabaneta is situated in Venezuela's Andean lowlands, with the Andes Mountains to the west and south. Both Chávez's mother and father were local schoolteachers there. His father, Hugo Sr., had dropped out of school after completing the sixth grade. However, he later qualified to teach primary school. His brothers are: Adán (born 11 April 1952), Narciso (born 6 January 1956), Aníbal (31 December 1956 – 16 July 2016), Argenis (born 3 January 1958), Enzo (December 1958-1960) and Adelis (born 1960).

The ancestry of the Chávez family has roots in central Venezuela's llanos. Chávez was the great-grandson of rebel Pedro Pérez Delgado, better known as "Maisanta". Maisanta was a lifelong rebel leader who helped spur an uprising that, before his capture in 1922, left dead both a Venezuelan ex-president and a state governor.

== Childhood (1954–1971) ==
Barinas, the home state of Chávez. Sabaneta, Chávez's home town, is located deep in the Venezuelan hinterland and far from the more urbanized northern coastal strip facing the Caribbean Sea.

Chávez grew up in a small house composed of large palm leaves constructed over a bare dirt floor. His family lived in a small village just outside Sabaneta. Chávez and his siblings were urged by his parents to embrace education as a way of escaping their rural surroundings and attain better lives in the more prosperous cities. Chávez's mother wanted him to become a Catholic priest, and so he was made to serve as an altar boy for one year. One of his duties was to clean and polish figurines depicting the saints and Jesus; Chávez developed a dislike of Jesus' depiction as a simple figurine. Specifically, Chávez was offended by what he saw as his church's portrayal of Jesus as "an idiot" and not, as Chávez considered Jesus to be, "a rebel". These experiences resulted in Chávez's lifelong distrust of religious hierarchies.

Later, Chávez's parents sent him and his older brother Adán to live with their paternal grandmother, Rosa Inés Chávez, who lived in Sabaneta proper. This resulted in Chávez developing a stronger relationship with his grandmother than with his own mother. Later, Chávez's own parents and his siblings moved to a nearby house, Chávez recounts the odd situation of his parents' move to a different house (than that where he and his paternal grandmother lived) in Sabaneta:

"[They moved to Sabaneta] and my father built a little house... diagonally across from my grandmother's house, which was made of thatch. My parents lived there with the other children as they came along .... [Theirs] was a little house made of [cement blocks], a rural house, but it had an asbestos roof and a cement floor."

Thus, Chávez and Adán remained with their grandmother. Yet Chávez did have regular contact with his parents. Although the majority of children in the region where he grew up never pursued higher studies, Chávez proved to be one of the exceptions. He began by attending elementary school at Julián Pino School. Meanwhile, he pursued such hobbies as painting and singing. At the ages of twelve and thirteen, Chávez was a very thin child with unusually large feet, and Chávez's peers dubbed him "Tribilin", the Spanish name for the Disney character Goofy. After school, Chávez worked as a street vendor, selling the caramelized fruit sweets that his grandmother made.

Chávez would later recall developing an appreciation for nature; this stemmed from his family's proximity to the Guanare River. There, he would take fishing trips with his father; on days such as Easter, his family held picnics on the riverbank. However, Chávez was most interested in baseball. One of his childhood dreams was to become a pitcher for the San Francisco Giants, following in the footsteps of his childhood hero, Venezuelan pitcher Néstor "Látigo" Chávez (no relation). When Látigo died at age 23 on 16 March 1969 in Zulia State, in the second worst airplane crash in Venezuela's history, Chávez was saddened to the extent that he refused to go to school for two days. Five years later, Chávez was still writing about Látigo in his personal diary, and Chávez would continue to play and enjoy baseball throughout his life. Chávez also played baseball and softball with the Criollitos de Venezuela, who played in the 1969 Venezuelan National Baseball Championships. He also wrote poems, stories, and dramas.

From his early childhood on, Hugo Chávez was also interested in the life, ideology, and writings of Simón Bolívar. Bolívar is widely respected both in Venezuela and the rest of South America as a Venezuelan revolutionary and freedom fighter. He is particularly well-remembered for his central role in the Spanish American wars of independence. Indeed, from his childhood onwards, Chávez would tie key dates in his own life with important anniversaries relating to Bolívar's actions.

Chávez later moved to the larger town of Barinas, where he attended high school at the Daniel Florencio O'Leary School. Throughout his high school years, Chávez's best friends were two brothers who were the sons of Jose Ruiz, a communist who had been incarcerated by the government of military dictator Marcos Pérez Jiménez. In the library of the Ruiz family, Chávez first began to read books dealing with communism and socialism. Later, at the age of seventeen, Chávez joined the Venezuelan armed forces. He later recalled that he joined so that he would be eligible to play in the military baseball leagues. He subsequently enrolled in 1971 as a fourth class cadet of the then Military Academy of Venezuela.

== Life as a cadet (1971–1975) ==
Aside from his regular studies in college, Chávez also read history books and debated politics with fellow cadets. Between 1971 and 1973, a group of Panamanian military cadets came to Chávez's academy. From them, Chávez first learned of Panama's leader, Omar Torrijos, and the recent leftist Panamanian revolution. Chávez's curiosity was piqued by Torrijos' efforts to regain control of both the Panama Canal and the Panama Canal Zone from its traditional owner, the United States government. Thereafter, Chávez looked at Torrijos as a model leader.

In 1974, Chávez and around one dozen fellow cadets and soldiers—all youths—traveled to Ayacucho, Peru to celebrate the 150th anniversary of the eponymous Battle of Ayacucho. There, they were personally greeted by radical leftist Juan Velasco Alvarado, the President of Peru between 1968 and 1975. Velasco gave each of them a miniature pocket edition of La Revolución Nacional Peruana ("The Peruvian National Revolution"). The cadets also noted Velasco's perceived close relationship with both the Peruvian masses and the rank and file of the Peruvian military. Chávez became attached to this book, and would both study its contents and constantly carry it on his person. However, Chávez later lost it after his arrest for leading the 1992 Venezuelan coup attempt. Twenty-five years later, as president, Chávez ordered the printing of millions of copies of his government's new Bolivarian Constitution—only in the form of miniature blue booklets, a partial tribute to Velasco's gift.

While studying at the military academy, Chávez generally avoided all discussion of politics with his family, especially whenever he stayed with them during holidays. He particularly disliked political discussion with his father, who was then a member of the COPEI political party—indeed, his father would eventually rise to the position of education director of Barinas during the COPEI administration of Luis Herrera Campins. However, Chávez did enjoy such talk during his regular visits to the Ruiz family household. For several months during 1974, Chávez maintained a personal diary; in it, he was careful in his usage of proper Spanish language. Chávez also expressed a leftist political orientation; writing of his dislike of U.S. foreign policy and Venezuela's perceived lack of a distinct national or cultural identity. As an example, he noted that both Venezuela's national sport (baseball) and Venezuela's popular music ultimately were American in origin.

As a so-called provinciano ("provincial person", that is, an implication of backwardness regarding the social graces of urban life), Chávez was prima facie regarded by his peers as both polite and shy. However, by the time he had graduated, Chávez had emceed a beauty contest as well as taken charge of his own obscure radio program. As a young man, Chávez had two girlfriends, who were considered by other students as unattractive. Chávez too was widely considered unattractive, and these girlfriends were more interested in two of Chávez's best friends, the Ruiz brothers, than in Chávez himself. Chávez also had his share of social upsets; for example, when a young woman whom he considered attractive refused to pay any attention to him, Chávez found a rotting donkey head on the side of the road and left it in front of her door. Later, Chávez found another girlfriend, Herma Marksman, who helped draft a capstone thesis required of him prior to graduation. Chávez would—after his marriage at age 23. to Nancy Colmenares— later commit adultery with Marksman. His relationship with Marksman lasted nine years.

Chávez graduated eighth in his class on 5 July 1975 as a sub-lieutenant with a degree in military arts and science. After receiving his sword of command personally from the hands of President Carlos Andrés Pérez during an annual parade, Chávez entered military service.
