= María Gabriela Chávez =

Venezuelan diplomat, daughter of President Hugo Chávez

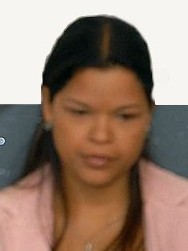
- Chávez in 2007
- Born: María Gabriela Chávez Colmenares; 12 March 1980 (age 46); Barinas, Venezuela
- Education: Bolivarian University of Venezuela
- Occupation: Diplomat
- Partner: Giovanny Rivero (1997–1998)
- Children: 1
- Parents: Hugo Chávez (father); Nancy Colmenares (mother)
- Family: Pedro Pérez Delgado (great-great grandfather); Hugo de los Reyes Chávez (grandfather); Elena Frías de Chávez (grandmother); Adán Chávez (uncle); Aníbal José Chávez Frías (uncle); Argenis Chávez (uncle); Asdrúbal Chávez (second cousin)

Alternate Ambassador of Venezuela to the United Nations
- In office 13 August 2014 – 15 January 2019 Serving with Samuel Moncada
- President: Nicolás Maduro

First Lady of Venezuela Acting
- In office 2003–2013
- President: Hugo Chávez

María Gabriela Chávez Colmenares (born 12 March 1980). She is the daughter of former President Hugo Chávez, and acted as his First Lady after his separation from Marisabel Rodríguez in 2003.

== Biography ==
María Gabriela Chávez is the second of the three children that Hugo Rafael Chávez had during his first marriage with Nancy Coromoto Colmenares. Her siblings are: Rosa Virginia (1978) and Hugo Rafael (1982). In addition, she has three half-sisters: Rosinés Chávez Rodríguez (1997), Génesis María Chávez Segura (2005) and Sara Manuela Chávez Fajardo (2008). On April 18, 1998, her daughter, Gabriela Alejandra Rivero, was born from her relationship with Giovanny Alexander Rivero Montes (1979); a native of San Joaquín Municipality, Carabobo. She has a grandson, Paulo Aponte, born on August 12, 2025.

She enrolled at the Central University of Venezuela majoring in International Studies, but transferred to Social Communication after her sixth semester when she had a problem with a teacher. She graduated as a social communicator at the Bolivarian University of Venezuela, although she has not formally practiced the profession.

On 12 April 2002, during the coup d'état attempt, after the military announced that President Chávez had resigned and transferred him to the Fuerte Tiuna base outside of Caracas, María Gabriela was the first person whom Chávez phoned; their conversation was captured by the Associated Press. She contacted several journalists to report that a coup was taking place. According to statements by Fidel Castro in the Cuban newspaper Granma, he advised her to declare to the international media that Chávez had not resigned from the presidency, saying that "Then I immediately prepared her to speak with Randy the journalist, and at 12:40 we fired off (her message) on the air (...) and we delivered it to the agencies and CNN." On the same day, María Gabriela Chávez offered a telephone interview to the Cuban journalist Randy Alonso.

Like Zulemita Menem and Keiko Fujimori, she assumed the role of First Lady of Venezuela after her father divorced, accompanying him on trips and at official events. During the 17th Ibero-American Summit of Heads of State and Government, held in Santiago, Chile from 8 to 10 November 2007, she participated in the First Ladies' agenda. On 13 August 2014, she was appointed as Alternate Ambassador of Venezuela to the United Nations, a position she left on 15 January 2019.

== Controversies ==
In July 2014, deputies Abelardo Díaz and Homero Ruiz, both of the Copei party, alleged that María Gabriela Chávez was involved in an irregular contract with the Argentine company Bioart S.A., which consisted of the purchase of rice and white corn overpriced by $15.5 million under the agri-food agreement between Venezuela and Argentina.

In October 2013, the Argentine rice sector, through the directors of the National Federation of Rice Producers (Fedenar), denounced the presence of a new company called Bioart SA. Bioart SA, a company that traded grains to the Caribbean nation after a bilateral agreement between the two countries was signed in May 2013, advocating for the elimination of intermediaries, was founded in 2009 by María Isabel and María Eugenia Vignati. However, it was only in November 2013 that the company registered with the AFIP (Argentine Federal Public Revenue Administration) under the category of "Wholesale of Cereals." The complaint alleges that Bioart SA was the only company to receive permits to export grains to Venezuela. It managed to make two shipments of paddy rice: one of 10,247 tons and another of 27,500 tons, which left the port of San Pedro on June 16th. The shipments, valued at $16,678,750, were sold in Venezuela for $23 million, a 40% markup. Bioart SA acted as an intermediary in the transaction. In exchange, they sold silos, machinery, and spare parts that they did not produce (they resold them).

Bioart S.A. exported 39,000 tons of rice and 28,000 tons of white corn to Venezuela at prices 30% above the world average. The company was connected to Julio De Vido, a former minister during the Kirchner era (currently detained in the Federal Penitentiary Complex II of Marcos Paz, Argentina, for corruption and influence peddling), who conducted numerous questionable business deals with Venezuela. According to the complaint, the contract was signed after executives of the Argentine firm met in Caracas with María Gabriela Chávez.

Venezuelan lawyer Roberto Leyba Morales, Gabriela's partner and half-brother of Manuel "Coko" Sosa, whom Gabriela had dated in 2013, opened a checking account at Mercantil Commercebank in Miami in early 2014. This account, which handled deposits and transfers totaling several million dollars, was closed in 2016 due to inconsistencies and suspicions of money laundering stemming from corruption. Leyba was unable to provide answers to the investigation. Initially, he declared an annual salary of $300,000 and annual commission income of $800,000. He received several commissions from a Cypriot bank. The deposits came from: payments of “commissions” for the purchase of the MV Speed Runner vessel. Others were for consulting services related to the purchase of a ferry from Naviera Paraguaná C.A., which he overcharged by $11.6 million when its actual value was $5 million. Other income was demonstrated. In November 2018, Venezuelan Attorney General Luisa Ortega Díaz opened a money laundering investigation. On February 24, 2021, the case was closed after it was determined that the overpricing was proportional to the high risk involved in these commercial transactions.

María Gabriela Chávez is banned from entering neighboring Colombia. The Colombian government maintains a list of people banned from entering the country or subject to expulsion; as of January 2019, the list had 200 people with a "close relationship and support for the Nicolás Maduro regime".

=== False claims about her wealth ===
On 7 August 2015, Diario Las Américas published an article on its website entitled "María Gabriela Chávez podría ser la mujer más rica de Venezuela" ("María Gabriela Chávez could be the richest woman in Venezuela"). In it, the newspaper said that Chávez holds $4.197 billion in her bank accounts in Andorra and the United States, more than Venezuelan businessmen such as Lorenzo Mendoza and Gustavo Cisneros. On 10 August 2015, Eva Golinger sent a letter to Diario Las Américas acting as Chávez's lawyer, demanding that the newspaper "desist from defamation of the character and reputation" of her client and "issue a complete and just retraction (...) of any defamatory assertion," affirming that Chávez was a victim of defamation and that she had suffered damages from the article. In its response, Diario Las Américas stated that it had obtained this information from the Venezuelan websites “Dolar Today, Maduradas y Yoyopress,” which are, however, which are known to be aggregators of news and misinformation.

Several fact-checking sites have concluded that this information is false.
