= Adán Chávez =

Venezuelan politician (born 1952)

Adán Chávez Frías
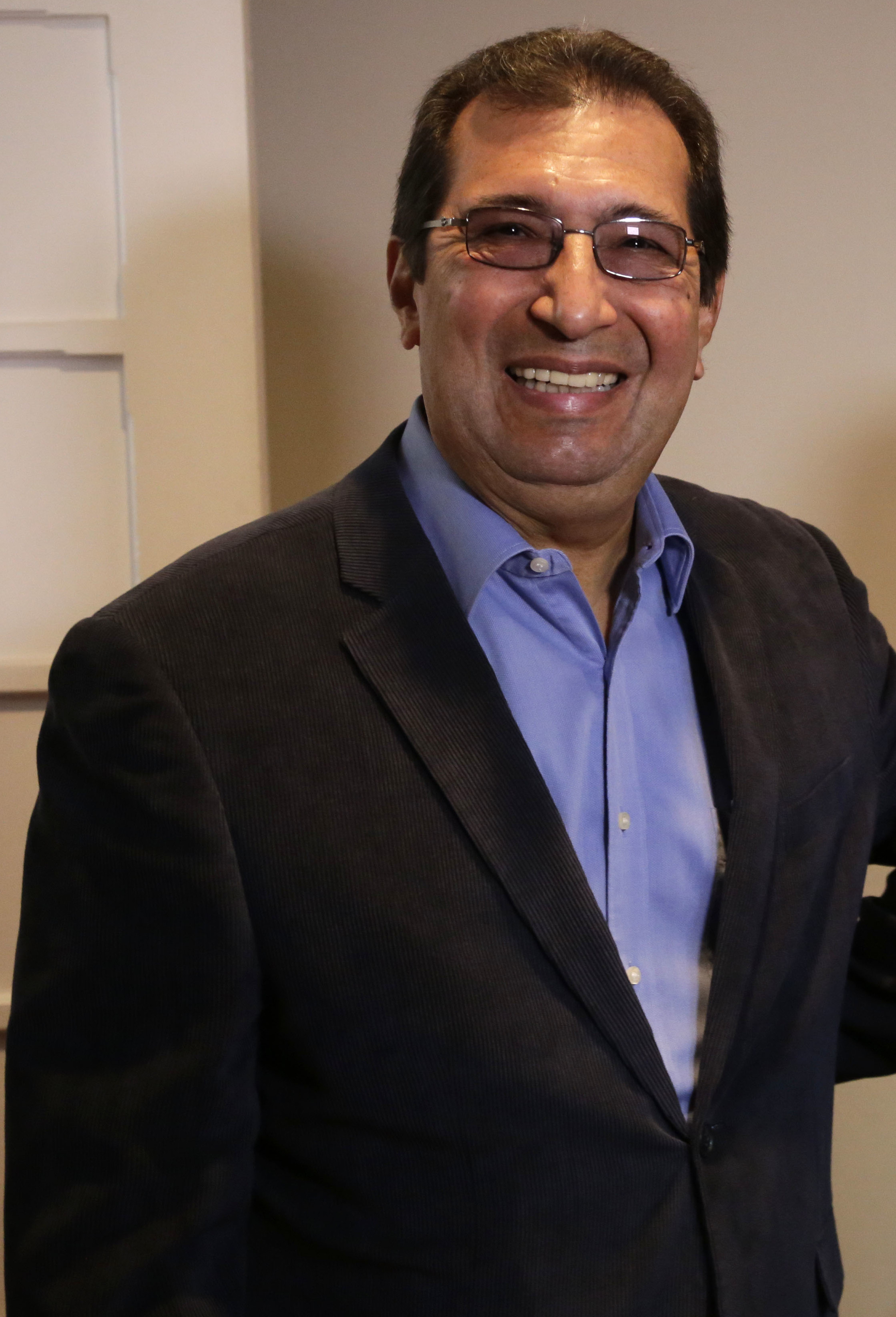

Governor of Barinas
- Incumbent
- Assumed office 9 June 2025
- Preceded by: Sergio Garrido
- In office 25 November 2008 – 4 January 2016
- Preceded by: Hugo de los Reyes Chávez
- Succeeded by: Zenaida Gallardo

Ministry of Popular Power for Culture
- In office 4 January 2017 – 17 June 2017
- President: Nicolás Maduro
- Preceded by: Freddy Ñáñez
- Succeeded by: Ana Alejandrina Reyes

Minister of Education
- In office 6 January 2007 – 29 April 2008
- President: Hugo Chávez
- Preceded by: Aristóbulo Istúriz
- Succeeded by: Héctor Navarro

Minister for Presidential Affairs
- In office 4 August 2006 – 6 January 2007
- President: Hugo Chávez
- Preceded by: Delcy Rodríguez
- Succeeded by: Hugo Cabezas Bracamonte

Member of the Constituent National Assembly
- In office 25 July 1999 – 15 December 1999

Personal details
- Born: 11 April 1952 (age 74) Sabaneta, Barinas, Venezuela
- Party: United Socialist Party of Venezuela (PSUV)
- Spouse: Carmen Hernández (m. 1974)
- Children: 4
- Parent(s): Hugo de los Reyes Chávez; Elena Frías de Chávez

Adán Chávez Frías (born 11 April 1952) is a Venezuelan politician who was Governor of Barinas state from 2008 to 2016 and again since 2025. Previously, he was Ambassador to Cuba and then Minister of Education from 2007 to 2008.

== Guerrilla affiliations ==
Adán studied at the University of the Andes, in Mérida where he was involved with pro-guerrilla groups prior to the election of his brother Hugo into the presidency. Through Adán, Hugo met with guerrilla fighters Douglas Bravo and William Izarra.

== Political career ==
In 2008, he was elected as Governor of Barinas as the United Socialist Party of Venezuela (PSUV) candidate, replacing his father Hugo de los Reyes Chávez.

On March 7, 2019, he was appointed Venezuelan ambassador to Cuba by President Nicolás Maduro and since February 14, 2023, he has been the Rector (academia) of the Universidad Nacional Experimental de los Llanos Ezequiel Zamora.

Chávez has been critical of the United States government, stating to PSUV members in 2018 that "we have an enemy, the American empire is our fundamental enemy, nobody can get lost in the forest of other considerations".

== Sanctions ==
=== United States ===
On 9 August 2017, the United States Department of the Treasury placed sanctions on Chávez for his position in the Presidential Commission in the 2017 Constituent Assembly of Venezuela.

=== Canada ===
On 3 November 2017, the Government of Canada sanctioned Chávez as being someone who participated in "significant acts of corruption or who have been involved in serious violations of human rights".

=== Panama ===
On 29 March 2018, Chávez was sanctioned by the Panamanian government for his alleged involvement with "money laundering, financing of terrorism and financing the proliferation of weapons of mass destruction".

== Personal life ==
He is the eldest brother of Hugo Chávez (1954–2013), who was President of Venezuela from 1999 to 2013, the mayor of Sabaneta, Barinas, Anibal José Chávez Frías (31 December 1956–16 July 2016), his successor in the gubernatorial position, Argenis Chávez (born 3 January 1958), who served for one term from 2016 to 2021 and three other brothers: Narciso (born 6 January 1956), Enzo (December 1958-1960) and Adelis (born 1960).

At a young age, his parents entrusted his upbringing and that of his brother Hugo to his paternal grandmother, Rosa Inés Chávez (1910-1981). He is married to Carmen Herenia Hernández Puente, born on February 26, 1954 in Merida since 1974, with whom he has four children namely Enzo, (born 24 June 1975), Elena (born 26 December 1977), Ernesto (born 31 January 1983) and Elyana (born 24 November 1985). He also has nine grandchildren. Chávez is the great-grandson of the Venezuelan leader Pedro Pérez Delgado, known as Maisanta, leader of the anti-Gomecista rebellion, who in 1898 ended the life of former president Joaquín Crespo.

Preceded by Hugo de los Reyes Chávez	Governor of Barinas; 2008–2016	Succeeded by Zenaida Gallardo
Preceded by Sergio Garrido	Governor of Barinas; 2021–present	Succeeded by Incumbent
Preceded by Aristóbulo Istúriz	Minister of Education of Venezuela; 2007–2008	Succeeded by Hector Navarro
