= Argentine Venezuelans =

Argentine Venezuelans Argentino-Venezolanos
- (Argentina) (Venezuela)
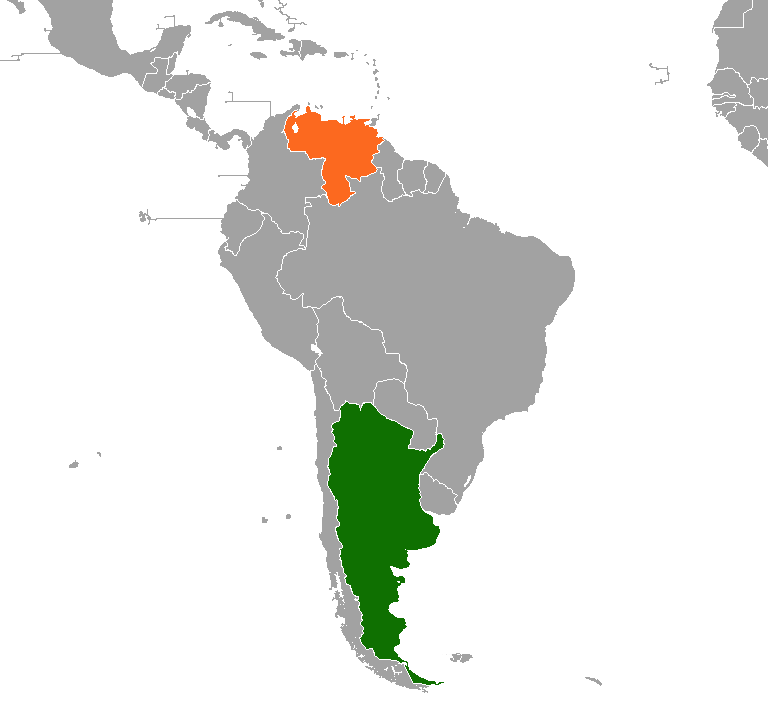

Total population
- 9,740 (2019)

Regions with significant populations
- Caracas, Maracaibo and Valencia

Languages
- Rioplatense Spanish; Venezuelan Spanish

Religion
- Roman Catholicism

Related ethnic groups
- Argentinians

Argentine Venezuelans (Spanish: argentino-venezolanos) are Venezuelan citizens of partial or full Argentine descent, or Argentine citizens who have migrated to and settled in Venezuela. Many Argentines fled their country and settled in Venezuela during the military dictatorship that ruled Argentina from 1976 to 1983. In 2019, an estimate numbered Argentine Venezuelans still living in Venezuela at 9,740.

== History ==
Argentine immigration to Venezuela had its peak during the 1970s. Many Argentines were fleeing the National Reorganization Process, the military dictatorship that ruled over Argentina from 1976 and 1983. The dictatorship persecuted leftists and other political opponents, and drove out middle-class professionals, causing a severe human capital flight. Other major periods of migration followed the economic crises suffered by Argentina during the 1980s and in 2001.

In recent years, due to the economic, social and political crisis in Venezuela, many Argentines and descendants of Argentines have chosen to return to their home country or to other, more stable countries, such as the United States.

== Notable people ==
Argentine immigrants to Venezuela

- Héctor Bidoglio – footballer
- Alberto Garrido – journalist and writer
- Fedra López – actress
- Ricardo Montaner – musician and singer-songwriter
- Rosalinda Serfaty – actress
- Juana Sujo – actress
- Hebe Vessuri – anthropologist

Venezuelans of Argentine descent

- Mara Croatto – actress
- Nahuel Ferraresi – footballer
- Júnior Moreno – footballer
- Mau y Ricky and Evaluna Montaner – musicians, children of Ricardo Montaner
- Claudia Suárez – former Miss Venezuela
- Lilian Tintori – kitesurfer and activist
- Elisa Trotta Gamus – human rights activist

== See also ==
- Argentina–Venezuela relations
- Argentine diaspora
- Immigration to Venezuela
- Venezuelan Argentines
