= Alberto Arvelo Torrealba =

- Born: September 3, 1905; Barinas, Venezuela
- Died: March 28, 1971 (aged 65); Caracas, Venezuela
- Occupations: Poet, diplomat, political figure
- Writing career
- Notable awards: National Prize for Literature of Venezuela; 1966

Alberto Arvelo Torrealba (September 3, 1905 – March 28, 1971), was a Venezuelan lawyer, educator and folklorical poet. He was the author of Florentino y El Diablo, which was set to music as a duet in the style known as contrapunteo.

== Legacy ==
A municipality in Barinas was named after him, and in the city of Barinas there is the Alberto Arvelo Torrealba Museum opened in 1981.

== Bibliography ==
- Música de cuatro (1928)
- Rezagos de un poemario extraviado en la cárcel (1929)
- Cantas (1933)
- Glosas al cancionero (1940)
- Florentino y El Diablo (1940/1950/1957)
- Caminos que andan (1962)
- Lazo Martí: vigencia en lejanía (1965)
- Obra poética (1967)

== See also ==
- Venezuela
- Culture of Venezuela
- List of Venezuelan writers
