= List of governors of Barinas =

- State coat of arms

- Flag of the State

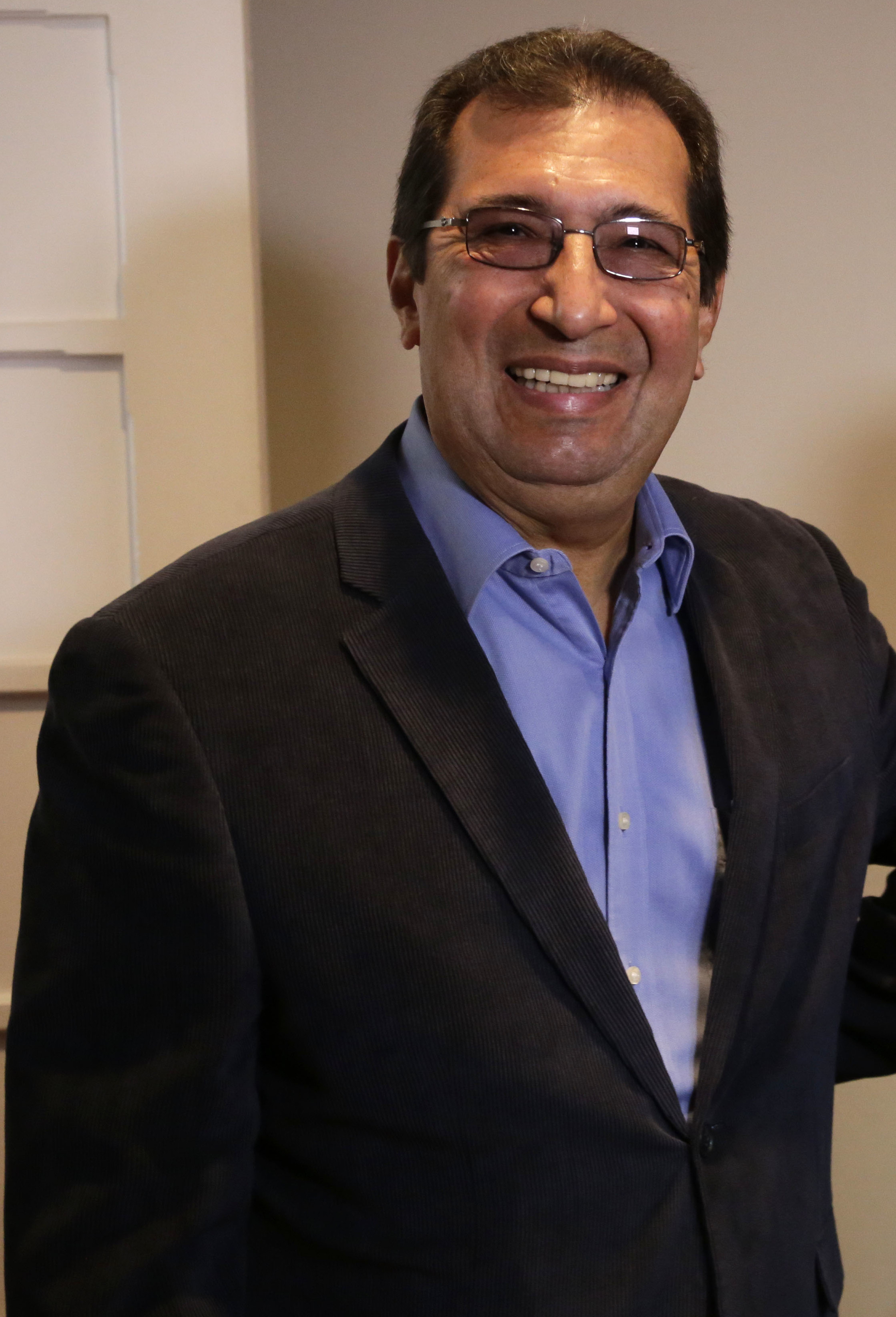
- Incumbent; Adán Chávez Frías
- Style: Governor
- Status: Head of State
- Term length: Four years

This is a list of governors of the Venezuelan Barinas State:

Until 1989, they were appointed by the president of Venezuela. Starting from that year they are elected in universal, direct and secret elections.

== Designated ==
Períod	Name	Party
1952–1954	José Domingo Colmenares Vivas	
1954–1958	Luis Alberto García Monsant	
1958–1959	Virgilio Tosta	
1959–1964	Luciano Valero	
1964–1964	Adonay Parra Jiménez	
1964–1966	José Octavio Henríquez	
1966–1967	José Tomás Heredia Angulo	
1967–1968	Adonay Parra Jiméndez	
1969–1974	Edgar Sanz Amair	
1974–1974	José Ángel Hernández	
1974–1975	Arturo Ramírez Dávila	
1975–1977	Guillermo Rincón Araujo	
1977–1979	Manuel Díaz Morontas	
1979–1980	José Napoleón Paredes	Copei
1980–1983	José González Puerte	COPEI
1983–1984	Arnoldo Matheus Camacho	COPEI
1984–1986	Pastor Salazar Rondón	AD
1986–1988	Rafael Rosales Peña	AD
1988–1989	Joffre Navas Silva	AD

== Elected governors ==
Took office	Left office	Governor	Vote
1989	1992	Rafael Rosales Peña, Acción Democrática	51.51
1992	1995	Gehard Cartay, COPEI	51.94
1995	1998	Rafael Rosales Peña, Acción Democrática	52.11
1998	2000	Hugo de los Reyes Chávez, MVR	43.56
2000	2004	Hugo de los Reyes Chávez, MVR	52.57
2004	2008	Hugo de los Reyes Chávez, MVR	76.26
2008	2012	Adán Chávez, PSUV	50.48
2012	2016	Adán Chávez, PSUV	57.89
2017	2017	Zenaida Gallardo, PSUV	Replacement after Adán Chávez resigned.
2017	2017	Argenis Chávez, PSUV	Replacement after Gallardo resigned.
2017	2021	Argenis Chávez, PSUV	53.11
2021	2025	Sergio Garrido, Ind.	55.34
2025	2029	Adán Chávez, PSUV	72.45

== See also ==
- List of Venezuela governors
- Politics of Venezuela
- History of Venezuela
