= Paola D'Alessio =

Planetary scientist

- Born: Paola D'Alessio Vessuri; 30 July 1964; Oxford, England
- Died: 14 November 2013 (aged 49); Morelia, Michoacán, Mexico
- Citizenship: United Kingdom; Venezuela; Mexico
- Education: Central University of Venezuela; National Autonomous University of Mexico
- Occupation: Planetary scientist
- Years active: 1996–2013
- Awards: Weizmann Prize (1997)

Paola D'Alessio Vessuri (1964–2013) was a British-born planetary scientist who worked in Mexico at the National Autonomous University of Mexico (UNAM) Center for Radioastronomy and Astrophysics. Her research concerned protoplanetary disks.

== Education and career ==
D'Alessio was born on 30 July 1964 in Oxford, the daughter of Argentine–Venezuelan social anthropologist Hebe Vessuri.

She studied physics as an undergraduate in Venezuela, at the Central University of Venezuela, with undergraduate research in the Centro de Investigaciones de Astronomia. She then went to UNAM for graduate study in astronomy, earning master's and doctoral degrees there and becoming a researcher at UNAM in 1996. After postdoctoral research at the Harvard–Smithsonian Center for Astrophysics and American Museum of Natural History she returned to UNAM in 2001, and soon after became affiliated with the newly formed Center for Radioastronomy and Astrophysics.

She died of cancer on 14 November 2013.

== Recognition ==
D'Alessio won the 1997 Weizmann Prize of the Mexican Academy of Sciences for the best doctoral thesis in the sciences in Mexico, and later became a member of the Mexican Academy of Sciences. UNAM gave her their Sor Juana Inés de la Cruz prize in 2006, and in 2010 she was given the Michoacán State Prize of Science and Technology.
