= Alberto Garrido =

Argentine-Venezuelan journalist and writer

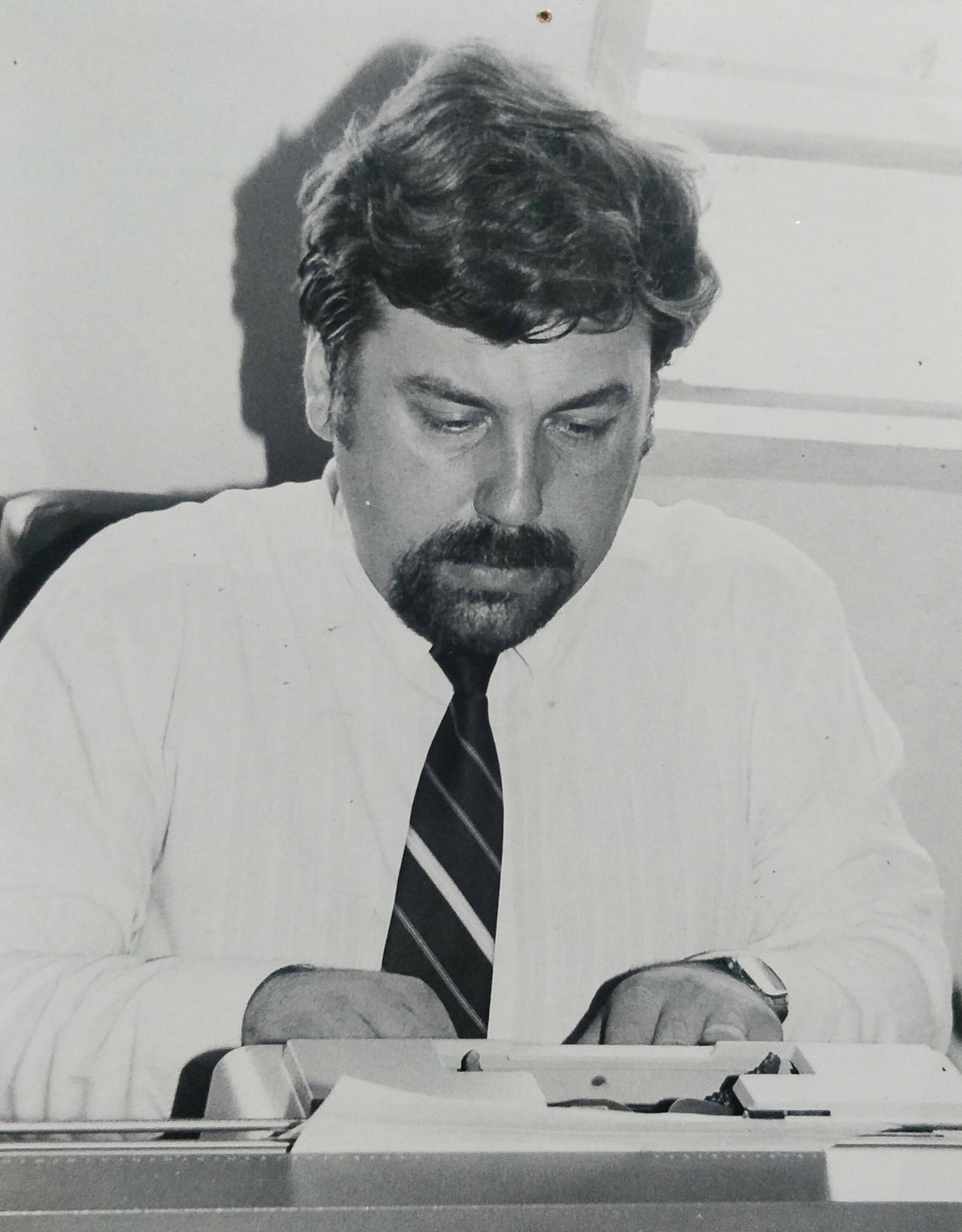
- Born: Alberto Rafael Garrido García; 3 September 1949; Buenos Aires, Argentina
- Died: 4 December 2007 (aged 58); Caracas, Venezuela
- Education: National University of Misiones
- Occupations: Journalist, writer, political analyst
- Known for: Works on Hugo Chávez

Alberto Rafael Garrido García (3 September 1949 – 4 December 2007) was an Argentine–Venezuelan journalist, political analyst and writer known for his works on Hugo Chávez. The focus of a better part of his career, his extensive knowledge on Chávez led Venezuelan media to dub him a "Chavólogo".

== Early life and education ==
Garrido was born in Buenos Aires in 1949. As a youth, he became politically active in leftist groups fighting against the military dictatorship that ruled the country from 1976 to 1983. His activism led to him fleeing Argentina and settling in Venezuela, where he finished high school at the Liceo Libertador in Mérida. He later returned to Argentina to study philosophy at the National University of Misiones and social psychology at the Universidad Argentina John F. Kennedy, before going back to Venezuela, where he completed a doctoral degree on agrarian development at the University of the Andes. He would later teach courses on Political Science at the University of the Andes.

Due to his Argentine heritage, he was known by Venezuelan coworkers, friends and peers as "Che Garrido".

== Career ==
Garrido's career in Venezuelan media led to him being appointed director of the local newspapers El Globo (Caracas) and El Correo de los Andes (Mérida). He was also an editorial advisor and political editor at Reporte and member of the directive board of Relevo magazine, and served as the Argentina correspondent of El Diario de Caracas during the Trial of the Juntas. He would later become a regular columnist at El Universal.

His first published book, Guerrilla y conspiración militar en Venezuela (1999) featured extensive interviews with leftist guerrilla fighters Douglas Bravo, William Izarra and Francisco Prada in the context of the election of Hugo Chávez as president of Venezuela. Over the course of his career, he released up to 17 books on Chávez and the Bolivarian Revolution, becoming one of the most published specialists on the Chávez phenomenon and leading Venezuelan media to dub him "Chavólogo". His views and positions were variously described as either pro-Chávez and anti-Chávez by supporters and detractors of the late president; Chávez himself considered Garrido's writing to be "unbiased".

In 2002, he published El otro Chávez, a controversial book compiling interviews with Herma Marksman, who was Chávez's mistress.

He died on 4 December 2007 in Caracas due to complications caused by pancreatic cancer, and was survived by a son and a daughter. His last interview, taken the day before his death by Jurate Rosales, was published in Revista Zeta on 7 December 2007.

== Works ==
=== On Hugo Chávez and the Bolivarian Revolution ===
- Guerrilla y conspiración militar en Venezuela. Testimonios de Douglas Bravo, William Izarra, Francisco Prada. Caracas: Fondo Editorial Nacional. 1999. ISBN 980-263-324-0.
- La historia secreta de la Revolución Bolivariana. Caracas: Editorial Venezolana. 2000. ISBN 980-292-803-8.
- La Revolución Bolivariana. De la guerrilla al militarismo. Revelaciones del comandante Arias Cárdenas. Caracas. 2000. ISBN 980-292-870-4. (self-published)
- Mi amigo Chávez. Conversaciones con Norberto Ceresole. Caracas. 2001. ISBN 980-292-972-7. (interviews with Norberto Ceresole; self-published)
- Hablan las FARC y el ELN. Guerrilla y Plan Colombia. Caracas: Producciones Karol. 2001. ISBN 980-292-933-6.
- El otro Chávez. Testimonio de Herma Marksman. Caracas. 2002. ISBN 980-07-8155-2. (interviews with Herma Marksman, self-published)
- Testimonios de la Revolución Bolivariana. Caracas. 2002. ISBN 980-07-8649-X. (self-published)
- Documentos de la Revolución Bolivariana. Caracas. 2002. ISBN 980-07-8650-3. (self-published)
- Guerrilla y Revolución Bolivariana. Documento. Caracas. 2003. ISBN 980-12-0158-4. (self-published)
- Guerra Global. Plan Colombia y Revolución Bolivariana. Notas. Caracas. 2003. ISBN 980-12-0376-5. (self-published)
- La línea roja de Chávez. Notas. Caracas. 2004. ISBN 980-12-0773-6. (self-published)
- Revolución Bolivariana 2005. Caracas. 2005. ISBN 980-12-1072-9. (self-published)
- La guerra (asimétrica) de Chávez. Caracas: Alfadil Ediciones. 2005. ISBN 980-354-173-0.
- Las guerras de Chávez. Caracas: Rayuela Taller de Ediciones. 2006. ISBN 980-6406-67-2.
- Chávez, Plan Andino y Guerra Asimétrica. Caracas: Los Libros de El Nacional, Fuera de Serie. 2006. ISBN 980-388-271-6.
- Chávez con uniforme. Antibiografía (Únicamente para chavólogos). Caracas. 2007. ISBN 978-980-12-2672-7. (self-published)

=== Other works ===
- La nueva relación entre Argentina y Brasil. Mérida: Impr. Talleres Gráficos de la Universidad de los Andes. 1987. ISBN 980-292-023-1.
- No Tengo Prisa: Conversaciones con Jesús Soto. Mérida: Consejo de Desarrollo Científico, Humanístico y Tecnológico de la U.L.A. 1989. ISBN 980-292-100-9.
