= Alberto Arvelo Torrealba Municipality =

Alberto Arvelo Torrealba Municipality Municipio Alberto Arvelo Torrealba
- Municipality
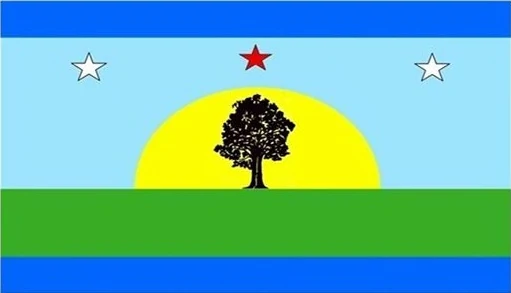
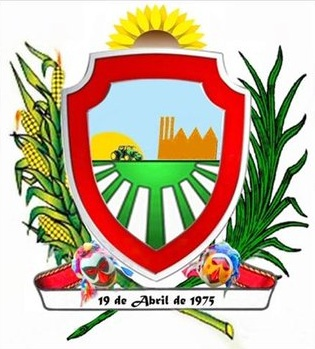
- Flag Coat of arms

- Location in Barinas

- Location in Venezuela
- Coordinates: 8°48′25″N 70°01′22″W
- Country: Venezuela
- State: Barinas
- Municipal seat: Sabaneta

Government
  - Mayor: Alexander Camacho Díaz (PSUV)

Area
  - Total: 875.1 km^{2} (337.9 sq mi)
- Elevation: 147 m (482 ft)

Population (2011)
  - Total: 41,232
  - Density: 47.12/km^{2} (122.0/sq mi)
- Time zone: UTC−4 (VET)
- Area code(s): 0273
- Website: Official website

The Alberto Arvelo Torrealba Municipality is one of the 12 municipalities (municipios) that makes up the Venezuelan state of Barinas and, according to the 2011 census by the National Institute of Statistics of Venezuela, the municipality has a population of 41,232. The town of Sabaneta is the County seat of the Alberto Arvelo Torrealba Municipality. The municipality is named for Alberto Arvelo Torrealba.

== History ==
The town of Sabaneta was founded by Juan de Alhama in 1787.

== Economy ==
The main industry in this municipality is the production of sugar.

== Demographics ==
The Alberto Arvelo Torrealba Municipality, according to a 2007 population estimate by the National Institute of Statistics of Venezuela, has a population of 36,363 (up from 33,190 in 2000). This amounts to 4.8% of the state's population. The municipality's population density is 47.3 inhabitants per square kilometre (123/sq mi).

== Government ==
The mayor of the Alberto Arvelo Torrealba Municipality is Anibal José Chávez Frías, elected on October 31, 2004, with 99% of the vote. He replaced Noel Zamudia shortly after the elections. The municipality is divided into two parishes; Sabaneta and Rodríguez Domínguez.
