= Hebe Vessuri =

Argentine anthropologist (born 1942)

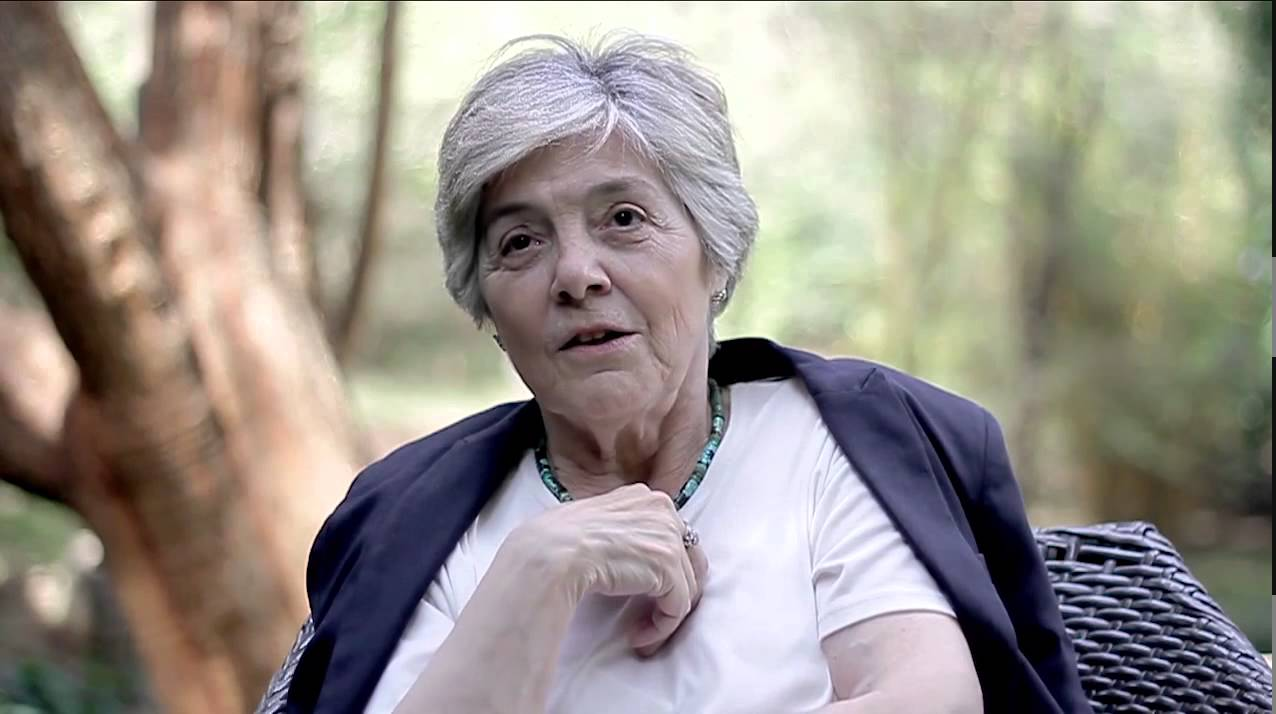
- Vessuri in 2018
- Born: Hebe María Cristina Vessuri; April 24, 1942 (age 84); Buenos Aires, Argentina
- Education: University of Oxford
- Occupation: social anthropologist
- Spouse: Santiago Bilbao

Hebe Vessuri is an Argentine–Venezuelan social anthropologist. In 2017, she was recognized with the John Desmond Bernal Prize Award from the Society for Social Studies of Science.

== Early life and education ==
Vessuri was born in 1942 in Buenos Aires. She married young and studied at the University of Oxford. While there, she wished to study anthropology but was unable to due to age restrictions. She received permission from the director of the Anthropology Faculty, E. E. Evans-Pritchard, to study under his supervision.

== Career ==
Due to the dictatorship growing in Argentina, she moved to Canada and taught at Dalhousie University in their Social Anthropology and General Anthropology Department. She eventually earned a grant to conduct her PhD in Santiago del Estero, under Raymond Carr.

In 1971, she accepted a position at the National University of Tucumán, and later moved to Venezuela with her husband. She subsequently joined the Faculty of Social Sciences at the Central University of Venezuela, where she later became head of the Center for Science Studies at the Venezuelan Institute for Scientific Research from 1992 to 2010. During this period, she received the 2006 National Prize for Science of Venezuela and the Oscar Varsavsky Prize to the scientific trajectory in the field of Science, Technology and Society Studies. Under her direction, she founded the postgraduate program in Social Studies of Science. In 2017, she became the first Latin American researcher to be awarded the John Desmond Bernal Prize of the Society of Social Studies of Science.

Vessuri also sits on the editorial boards of Social Studies of Science; Science, Technology, & Human Values journal, Industry & Higher Education; Interciencia (Venezuela) and Redes (Argentina) journal. She also collaborated with Pablo Kreimer, Lea Velho, and Antonio Arellano to publish the first handbook of Latin American STS, titled "Perspectivas Latinoamericanas en el Estudio Social de la Ciencia, la Tecnología y la Sociedad" in 2014.

== Personal life ==
Her daughter, Paola D'Alessio, was born in 1964 when she was in Oxford, and became a noted planetary scientist. She was also mother to Dr. Bibiana Bilbao, a renowned field and experimental ecologist, winner of the 2010 European Award ‘Innovation for Sustainable Development'.
