= Aníbal José Chávez Frías =

Venezuelan politician (1956–2016)

Mayor of Sabaneta
- In office October 31, 2004 – July 17, 2016
- Preceded by: Noel Zamudia

Personal details
- Born: December 31, 1956 Sabaneta, Barinas, Venezuela
- Died: July 17, 2016 (aged 59) Sabaneta, Venezuela
- Party: Fifth Republic Movement (until 2008); United Socialist Party of Venezuela (2008–2016)
- Children: 3
- Parent(s): Hugo de los Reyes Chávez; Elena Frías de Chávez

Aníbal José Chávez Frías (December 31, 1956 – July 17, 2016) was a Venezuelan politician. He was the mayor of Sabaneta, Barinas, and the younger brother of former President Hugo Chávez and governor Adán Chávez. Chávez was born in 1956 as the third son of Hugo de los Reyes Chávez and Elena Frías de Chávez.

== Mayor of Sabaneta ==
Aníbal was the mayor of Sabaneta, a city in Venezuela's Barinas State. Sabaneta is the capital city of Alberto Arvelo Torrealba municipality in Barinas. The city was founded by Juan de Alhama in 1787 and the principal industry is sugar production.

== Family ==
Aníbal was a member of the Chávez political family. His father is Hugo de los Reyes Chávez (a former state governor). Two of his brothers were also politicians: Hugo Chávez, who was President of Venezuela from 1999 until his death in 2013, Adán Chávez, governor of Barinas from 2008 to 2016 as well as Argenis Chávez, governor of Barinas from 2016 to 2021. He had three other brothers: Narciso (born 1956), Enzo (1958-1960) and Adelis (born 1960).

He had three children: Aníbal, Kharla and Indira.
