= Hugo de los Reyes Chávez =

Venezuelan politician (1932–2024)

Governor of Barinas
- In office 9 November 1998 – 25 November 2008
- Preceded by: Rafael Rosales Peña
- Succeeded by: Adán Chávez

Personal details
- Born: Hugo de los Reyes Chávez; 6 January 1932 Barinas, Barinas, Venezuela
- Died: 8 April 2024 (aged 92) Barinas, Barinas, Venezuela
- Party: COPEI (1978-2007); Fifth Republic Movement (1997-2007); United Socialist Party of Venezuela (2007-2024)
- Spouse: Elena Frías de Chávez (m. 1950)
- Children: Adán Chávez (born 1952); Hugo Chávez (1954–2013); Narciso Chávez (born 1956); Aníbal José Chávez Frías (1956–2016); Argenis Chávez (born 1958); Enzo Chávez (1958–1960); Adelis Chávez (born 1960)
- Parent(s): José Chávez Saavedra (deceased); Rosa de los Reyes Chávez (deceased)

Hugo de los Reyes Chávez (6 January 1932 – 8 April 2024) was a Venezuelan state politician and the father of the late Venezuelan president Hugo Chávez (1954–2013).

== Political career ==
Chávez was a regional director of education after his long service as a schoolteacher (of which he retired since turning 55 years old in 1987) and subsequently rose to prominence by joining the political arena as a member of the Social Christian Party (COPEI). He was governor of Barinas for two terms from 2000 to 2008.

Barinas State Governor Election, 2004 Results
Source: CNE data

Candidates	Votes	%
Hugo de los Reyes Chavez	135674	76%
Andres Eloy Camejo	24651	14%

== Personal life ==
He was the youngest of the three children of José Rafael Chávez Saavedra (1888–1945) and Rosa Inés de los Reyes Chávez (1910–1981). Chávez and his wife, Elena Frías de Chávez, started their careers as local schoolteachers. He dropped out of school after completing the sixth grade, later qualifying to teach.

Chávez is best known as the father of President Hugo Chávez. His other sons were Adán (born 11 April 1952), who succeeded him as governor of Barinas; Anibal (31 December 1956 – 16 July 2016), who served as mayor of Sabaneta, Barinas, from 2004 to 2016; Argenis (born 3 January 1958), the governor of Barinas from 2016 to 2021 and three other sons namely Narciso (born 6 January 1956), Enzo (December 1958 – 1960) and Adelis (born 1960).

Chávez died on 8 April 2024, at the age of 92, after outliving his three sons, Enzo who died at the young age of only two for 64, Hugo for 11 as well as Anibal for 8 years.
