= Herma Marksman =

Venezuelan historian (born 1949)

Herma Marksman (born 1949) is a Venezuelan historian.

== Biography ==
Marksman was born of a peasant woman and a German immigrant who worked as an ironworker union organizer. When she was in her 30s she met the future Venezuelan president Hugo Chávez, who was then married and in his twenties. She became his mistress from 1983 to 1992. They both were students of socialism and idealistic and she helped him in his academic studies. After the failed 1992 coup attempt Chávez left both his first wife and mistress.

Marksman now repudiates Chávez, and describes his government as imposing a "fascist dictatorship". She has also written several essays, and co-authored a book titled El otro Chávez (English: The other Chávez), describing her relationship with him, alongside Alberto Garrido.
