= Elena Frías de Chávez =

Mother of late Venezuelan president Hugo Chávez (born 1934)

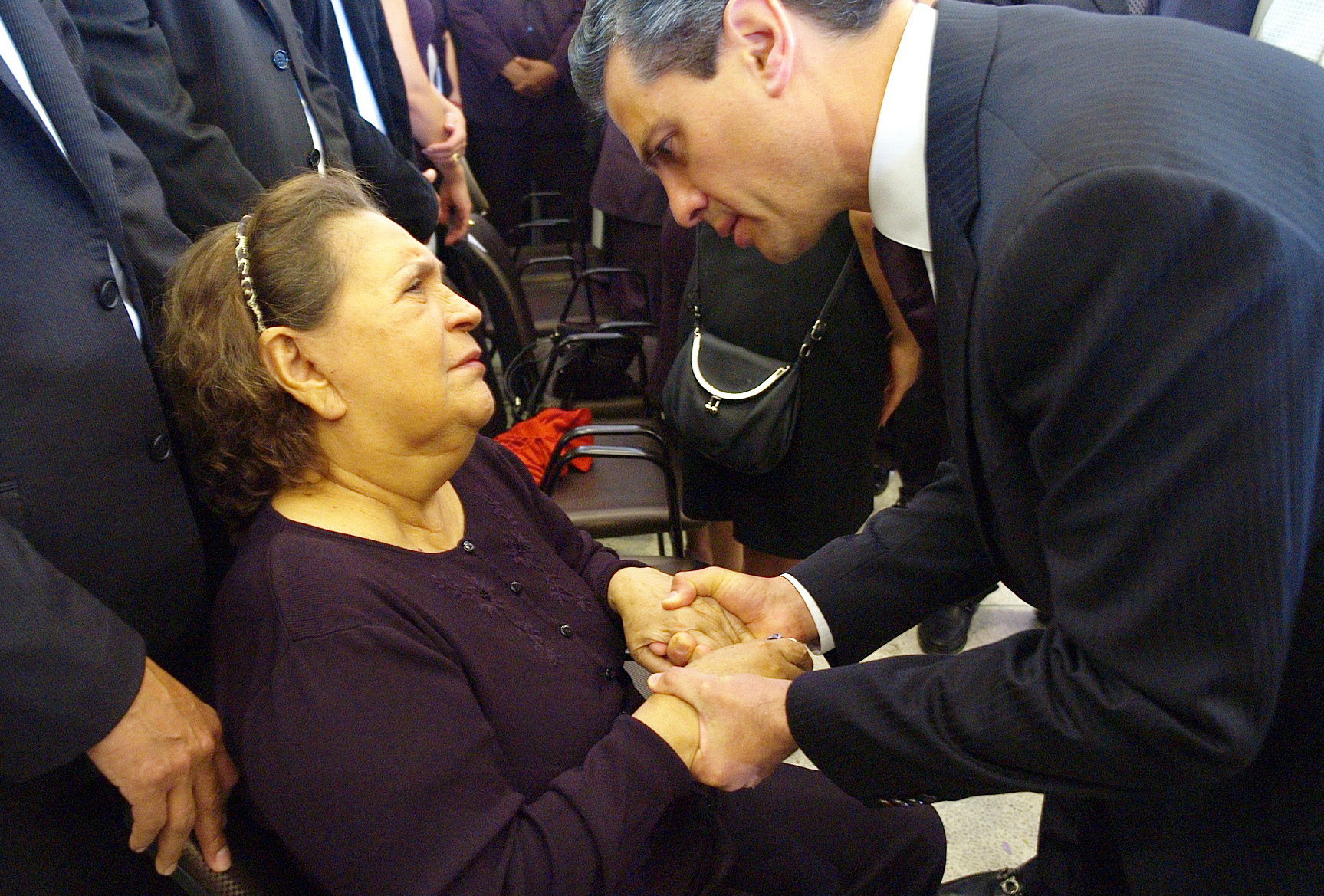
- Frías receiving condolences by then-Mexican President Enrique Peña Nieto during Hugo Chavez's funeral

First Lady of Barinas
- In office 2000–2008

Personal details
- Born: Elena Frías; 14 May 1934 (age 92) Barinas, Venezuela
- Spouse: Hugo de los Reyes Chávez (m. 1950; died 2024)
- Children: Adán Chávez (born 1952); Hugo Chávez (1954–2013); Narciso Chávez (born 1956); Aníbal José Chávez Frías (1956–2016); Argenis Chávez (born 1958); Enzo Chávez (1958–1960); Adelis Chávez (born 1960)
- Parent(s): Rafael Infante (deceased); Benita Frías (deceased)

Elena Frías de Chávez (born May 14, 1934) is the mother of late Venezuelan president Hugo Chávez, Aníbal José Chávez Frías and Adán Chávez and granddaughter of Pedro Pérez Delgado. She is the former First Lady of the state of Barinas and wife of Governor Hugo de los Reyes Chávez. She grew up in the village of San Hipólito, close to the capital city of Barinas, and met her husband, Hugo de los Reyes Chávez, when she was 16 and he was 18. She has raised seven sons including Hugo, her second born.
