= William Izarra =

Venezuelan diplomat, military officer, and politician (1947–2021)

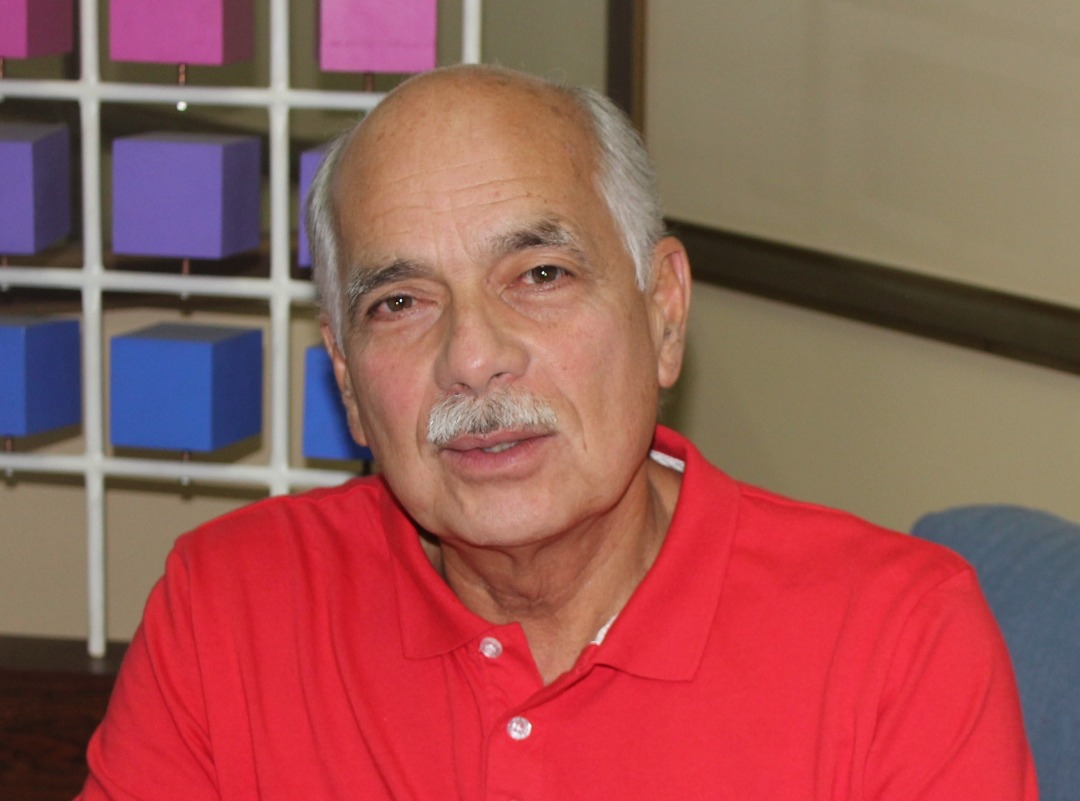

Ambassador of Venezuela to North Korea
- In office 27 May 2021 – 1 October 2021
- President: Nicolás Maduro

Member of the Senate of Venezuela
- In office 1998–1999

Deputy Minister of Foreign Affairs for Asia, the Middle East and Oceania
- In office 14 January 2005 – 15 November 2005
- President: Hugo Chávez
- Preceded by: position established
- Succeeded by: Alcides Rondón Rivero

Personal details
- Born: William Ernesto Izarra Caldera; 7 May 1947 Maracay, Venezuela
- Died: 1 October 2021 (aged 74) Caracas, Venezuela
- Party: Fifth Republic Movement; PSUV

William Ernesto Izarra Caldera (7 May 1947 – 1 October 2021) was a Venezuelan diplomat, military official, and politician.

He also worked as a professor for the Central University of Venezuela.

== Biography ==
Following his military service, Izarra earned a master's degree in public policy planning from Harvard University and was awarded an honorary doctorate from Universidad Nacional Experimental Simón Rodríguez in 2010. He was a member of the Revolutionary Bolivarian Movement-200, the Fifth Republic Movement and the United Socialist Party of Venezuela. He also organized the Alianza Revolucionaria de Oficiales Activos. In 1989, he joined the Frente Patriótico Revolucionario. He continued his revolutionary work for socialism throughout his life.

Izarra served in the Senate of Venezuela from 1998 to 1999 and was appointed by Hugo Chávez to serve in the newly-created position Deputy Minister of Foreign Affairs for Asia, the Middle East and Oceania in 2005. In 2021, he served as Venezuela's ambassador to North Korea.

William Izarra died from COVID-19 in Caracas on 1 October 2021, at age 74, during the COVID-19 pandemic in Venezuela.

== Publications ==
- En Busca de la Revolución
- El tiempo que nos queda
- Momentos de la Revolución
- Folletos del Proceso
- Cuentos de Fácil Lectura
- Los Toques del Clarín
