= Pedro Pérez Delgado =

Venezuelan revolutionary and politician

Pedro Pérez Delgado or "Maisanta" (on the right).

Pedro Pérez Delgado (1881, Ospino, Estado Portuguesa, Venezuela - 7 November 1924, Puerto Cabello, Venezuela), better known as "Maisanta", was a nineteenth-century Venezuelan revolutionary and politician, who fought against the government of General Juan Vicente Gómez.

It has been claimed that he was the great great grandfather of late-20th- and early-21st-century president of Venezuela, Hugo Chávez (1954–2013).

Son of Pedro Pérez Pérez and Josefa Delgado, from a young age he had a strong temperament. He stood out in the Queipa Revolution in 1898. The following year, 1899, Cipriano Castro sent Pedro Pérez Delgado to Sabaneta, Barinas, as civil and military leader of the area. There he had two natural children with Claudina Infante: Pedro and Rafael, the latter father of Elena Frías de Chávez. The story also tells that he most likely had five other children. Since 1914 he was an officer in the dictatorship of Juan Vicente Gómez, however he deserted and began his guerrilla activities against the government of Gómez. By This fact he was a prisoner in 1922 and died imprisoned on November 7, 1924 in the Libertador Castle of Puerto Cabello at the age of 44 from cardiac syncope, possibly due to ingesting ground glass in food, on November 7, 1924, with his son Ramón Márquez.

== See also ==
- Political prisoners in Venezuela
