= Argenis Chávez =

Venezuelan politician

Argenis Chávez Frías

Governor of Barinas
- In office 15 October 2016 – 30 November 2021
- Preceded by: Zenaida Gallardo
- Succeeded by: Sergio Garrido

Deputy Minister of Electric Power
- In office 2011–2013

Personal details
- Born: July 3, 1958 (age 68) Sabaneta, Barinas, Venezuela
- Party: United Socialist Party of Venezuela (PSUV)
- Spouse: Belkis Quintero (m. 1999)
- Children: 2
- Parent(s): Hugo de los Reyes Chávez; Elena Frías de Chávez

Argenis Chávez Frías (born 3 July 1958) is a Venezuelan politician who served as Governor of Barinas state from 2016 to 2021. He is one of the brothers of the former Venezuelan president, Hugo Chávez.

He was secretary of the Barinas state government when his father, Hugo de los Reyes Chávez, was the governor from 1998 to 2008. In 2011, he was appointed Vice Minister of Electrical Development of the Ministry of Popular Power for Electric Power.

He has a daughter from a previous relationship named Laura Alejandra Chávez Contreras, born on February 26, 1984. On January 24, 1999, he remarried a lawyer, Belkis Del Pilar Quintero Infante (born 1969–1971), with whom he has a son; Argenis De Jesús Chávez Quintero born on September 19, 2002.

== Sanctions ==
In November 2017, Canada sanctioned Chávez and other Venezuelan officials under the Justice for Victims of Corrupt Foreign Officials Act, stating: "These individuals are responsible for, or complicit in, gross violations of internationally recognized human rights, have committed acts of significant corruption, or both."
