= Sabaneta, Barinas =

Sabaneta
- Town
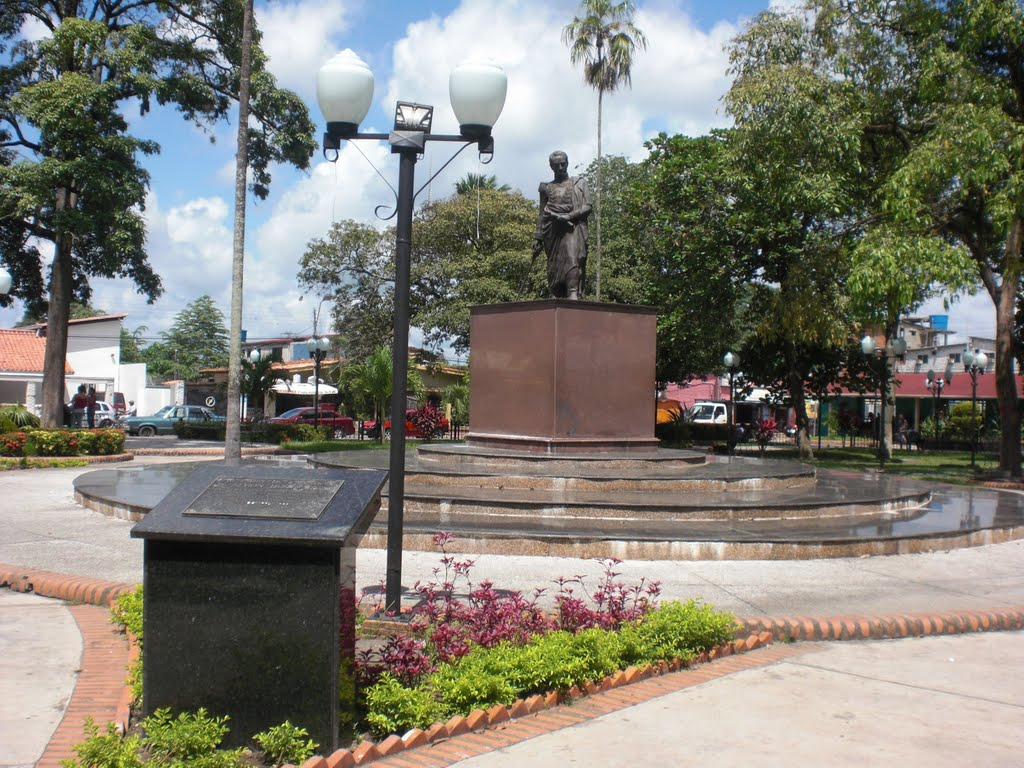
- Plaza Bolívar

- Location in Venezuela
- Coordinates: 8°45′10″N 69°55′59″W
- Country: Venezuela
- State: Barinas
- Municipality: Alberto Arvelo Torrealba
- Established: 1787

Government
  - Mayor: Zenaida Gillardo
- Elevation: 150 m (480 ft)

Population (2011)
  - Total: 20,419
- Time zone: UTC-04:00 (VET)
- Area code: 0273
- Climate: Aw

Sabaneta is a town in Venezuela's Barinas state. It is known for being the birthplace of the late President of Venezuela, Hugo Chávez, and his siblings. Sabaneta is the capital of Alberto Arvelo Torrealba Municipality in Barinas. The town was founded by Juan de Alhama in 1787. The principal industry is sugar production.

== See also ==
- List of cities and towns in Venezuela
