= 2024 Venezuelan presidential election =

- 28 July 2024
- Turnout: 57.90% (▲12.17pp) CNE; 60.00% (▲15.63pp) ConVzla
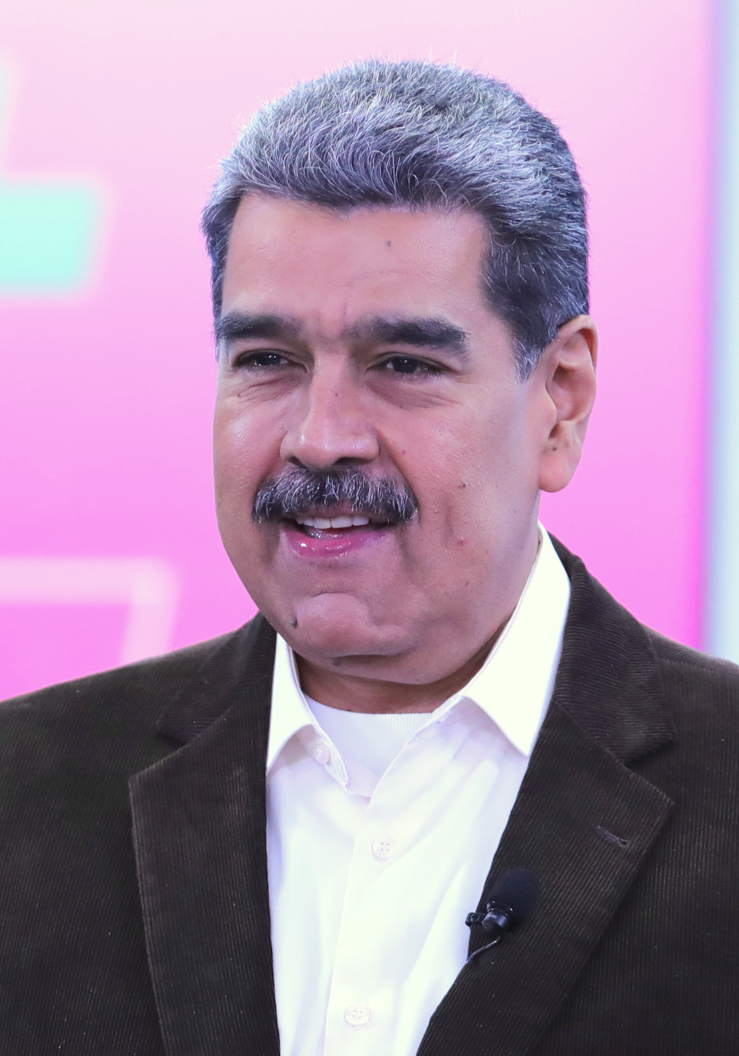

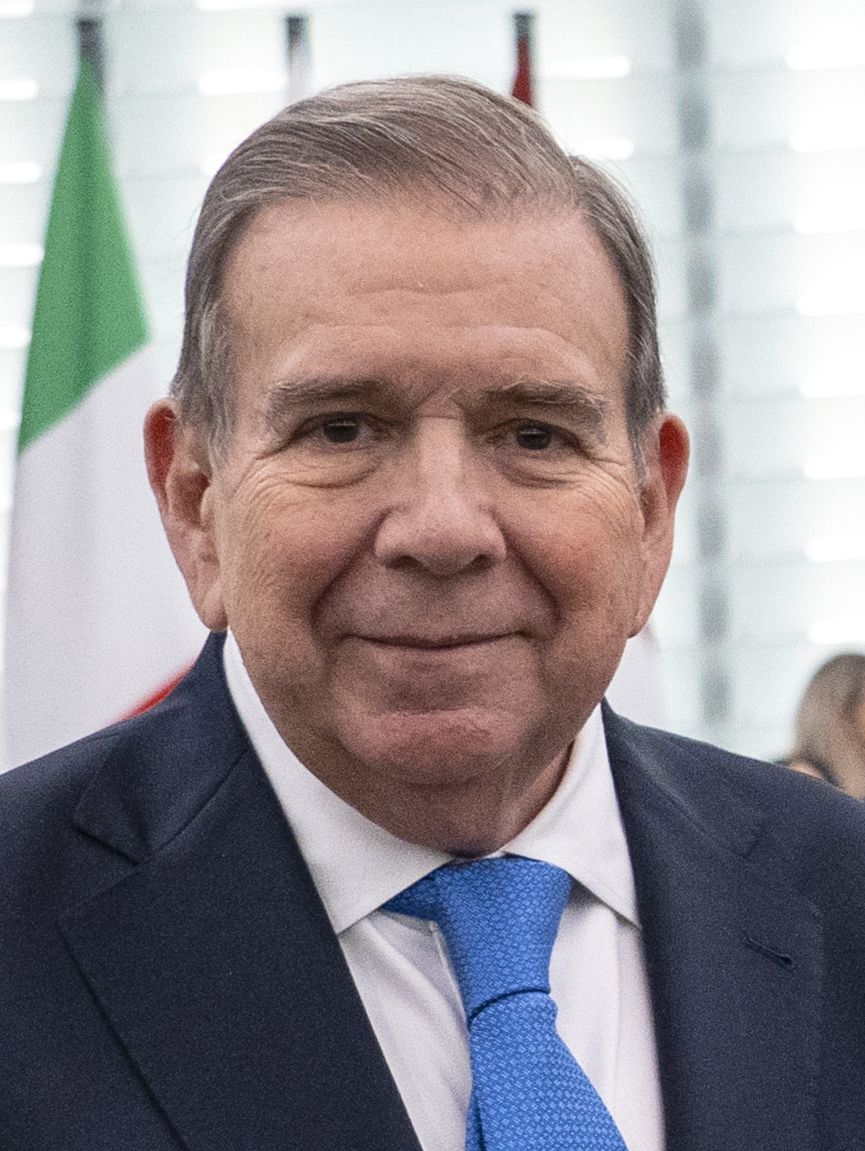
Candidate	Nicolás Maduro	Edmundo González
Party	PSUV	Independent
Alliance	GPPSB	PUD
Popular vote	6,408,844 (CNE); 3,385,155 (ConVzla)	5,326,104 (CNE); 7,443,584 (ConVzla)
Percentage	51.95% (CNE); 30.46% (ConVzla)	43.18% (CNE); 67.05% (ConVzla)
President before election
Nicolás Maduro
PSUV
Elected President
Nicolás Maduro (Disputed)
PSUV

Presidential elections were held in Venezuela on 28 July 2024 to choose a president for a six-year term beginning on 10 January 2025. The election was contentious, with international monitors calling it neither free nor fair, citing the incumbent Maduro administration's control over most institutions and repression of the political opposition before, during, and after the election.

Maduro ran for a third consecutive term, while Edmundo González represented the Unitary Platform (Spanish: Plataforma Unitaria Democrática; PUD), the main opposition political alliance. In June 2023, the Venezuelan government had barred leading candidate María Corina Machado from participating. This move was regarded by the opposition as a violation of political human rights and was condemned by international bodies such as the Organization of American States (OAS), the European Union, and Human Rights Watch, as well as numerous countries.

Academics, news outlets and the opposition provided strong evidence showing that González won the election by a wide margin with the opposition releasing copies of official tally sheets collected by poll watchers from a majority of polling centers showing a landslide victory for González. The National Electoral Council (CNE) announced results claiming a narrow Maduro victory on 29 July; vote tallies were not provided. The Carter Center was unable to verify the CNE's results, asserting the election failed to meet international democratic election standards. The CNE's results were rejected by the OAS, and the United Nations declared that there was "no precedent in contemporary democratic elections" for announcing a winner without providing tabulated results. Analyses by media sources found the CNE results statistically improbable and lacking in credibility. Parallel vote tabulation confirmed the win by González. Political scientist Steven Levitsky called the official results "one of the most egregious electoral frauds in modern Latin American history".

Protests occurred across the country and internationally, as the Maduro administration initiated Operation Tun Tun, a crackdown on dissent. Some world leaders rejected the CNE's claimed results and recognized González as the election winner, while some other countries, including Russia, China, Iran, North Korea and Cuba recognized Maduro as the winner. Maduro did not cede power, and instead asked the Supreme Tribunal of Justice (TSJ) to audit and approve the results. On 22 August, as anticipated, the TSJ described the CNE's statement of Maduro winning the election as "validated". The supreme court ruling was rejected by the United States, the European Union and ten Latin American countries. An arrest warrant was issued on 2 September for González for the alleged crimes of "usurpation of functions, falsification of public documents, instigation to disobey the law, conspiracy and association", according to Reuters. After seeking asylum in the Spanish Embassy in Caracas, González left for Spain on 7 September. Maduro was sworn in for what would be his third term on 10 January 2025. González flew to Spain where he received his right of asylum. Maduro himself was later captured by the US military in 2026, ending his presidency de facto wise.

== Background ==
=== Democratic backsliding and consolidation of power ===
The 2024 elections occurred within an authoritarian regime with significant democratic backsliding under Maduro.

Rampant crime, hyperinflation and shortages beginning in 2010 under the presidency of Hugo Chàvez led to a crisis in Venezuela; amid declining popularity of the government, the opposition was elected to the majority in the 2015 National Assembly. Following that election, the lame duck National Assembly, which had an outgoing pro-government majority, packed the Supreme Tribunal of Justice (TSJ) with Maduro allies. The new tribunal stripped three opposition lawmakers of their assembly seats in 2016, citing alleged "irregularities" in their election, thereby preventing an opposition supermajority which would have been able to challenge Maduro.

The TSJ granted Maduro more powers in 2017. As protests mounted, Maduro called a constituent assembly to rewrite the 1999 Venezuela Constitution created under Hugo Chávez. Over 40 countries stated that they would not recognize the 2017 Constituent National Assembly (ANC). The opposition Democratic Unity Roundtable boycotted the election, saying that the ANC was "a trick to keep [the incumbent ruling party] in power"; thus the coalition dominated by the United Socialist Party of Venezuela won almost all assembly seats. On 8 August 2017, the ANC banned the National Assembly from performing actions that would interfere with the constituent assembly, effectively stripping the elected opposition-majority National Assembly of power.

Scholars have argued that since Maduro assumed the presidency in 2013, the nation has veered towards dictatorship. Maduro "consolidate[d] power" by creating an alternate legislative body (the 2017 ANC) to eliminate the National Assembly and then using a packed Supreme Court to sideline the legislature and bar the major opposition figures from the 2018 Venezuelan presidential election.

=== 2018 election and subsequent presidential crisis ===
Maduro called for the 2018 presidential election to occur months before the prescribed December date. He was declared the winner in May 2018 after multiple major opposition parties were banned from participating, among other irregularities. The election results were widely disputed both nationally and internationally, and politicians considered him an ineffective dictator. In the months leading up to his 10 January 2019 inauguration, Maduro was pressured by international groups and other nations to step down; this pressure was increased after the new National Assembly of Venezuela was sworn in on 5 January 2019.

Maduro took his official oath on 10 January 2019. That same month, the National Assembly invoked clauses of the 1999 Venezuelan Constitution to install National Assembly Speaker Juan Guaidó as acting president, precipitating the Venezuelan presidential crisis.

By January 2020, efforts led by Guaidó to create a transitional government had been unsuccessful and Maduro continued to control Venezuela's state institutions. In January 2021, the European Union stopped recognizing Guaidó as president, but still did not recognize Maduro as the legitimate president; the European Parliament reaffirmed its recognition of Guaidó as president. After the announcement of regional elections in 2021, Guaidó proposed negotiations with Maduro with a schedule for free and fair elections in exchange for lifting international sanctions.

In December 2022, three of the four main opposition political parties (Justice First, Democratic Action and A New Era) backed and approved a reform to dissolve the interim government and create a commission of five members to manage foreign assets, as deputies sought a united strategy ahead of the 2024 elections, stating that the interim government had failed to achieve its goals.

=== 2020 transitional government proposal ===
On 31 March 2020, the United States proposed a transitional government that would exclude both Maduro and Guaidó from the presidency. The power-sharing deal provided for elections to be held within the year, and foreign militaries, particularly Cuba and Russia, to leave the country. The US was seeking Maduro's arrest at the time of the announcement. Experts stated that the deal explicitly mentioned who would lead a transitional government, something which stalled previous discussions, and coming shortly after the US indictment of Maduro, might pressure him to peacefully leave power.

Guaidó accepted the proposal, while Venezuela's foreign minister, Jorge Arreaza, rejected it and declared that only the parliamentary election would take place in 2020.

== Opposition primaries launched ==
In November 2022, Diosdado Cabello, vice-president of the PSUV and president of the ANC, insisted that the presidential election be moved forward to the first semester of 2023.

On 16 May 2023, the Unitary Platform announced it would hold a primary to elect a single candidate for the presidential election, the 2023 Unitary Platform presidential primaries, on 22 October 2023. On 24 July 2023, the application period ended, with 14 candidates registered.

=== Disqualification of Machado and Capriles ===
On 30 June 2023, the Comptroller General of the Republic of Venezuela announced that former National Assembly member María Corina Machado was disqualified from holding public office for 15 years, claiming she was linked to alleged crimes committed by Juan Guaidó and had supported international sanctions against Venezuela. She would be allowed to participate in the opposition primaries because they were not regulated by Maduro's government. Henrique Capriles was given the same sentence and barred from holding office until 2032. Analysts stated that the accusations were incoherent, as Machado was not a member of the 2015 opposition National Assembly with Guaidó, having been disqualified by the Comptroller's Office, nor had she served in his government. The disqualification was considered illegal and unconstitutional by several jurists, including constitutional lawyer Allan Brewer Carías and the Latin American and Caribbean Network for Democracy.

Machado's disqualification from holding office was pending a court decision when a debate was held on 12 July 2023 between eight of the thirteen opposition pre-candidates: Machado for Vente Venezuela, Carlos Prosperi for Democratic Action, Freddy Superlano for Popular Will, transgender candidate Tamara Adrián for Unidos por la Dignidad, Delsa Solórzano for Encuentro Ciudadano, Andrés Velásquez for La Causa R, César Pérez Vivas for Concertación Ciudadana and Andrés Caleca for Movimiento por Venezuela.

=== Harassment and intimidation during primaries ===
Pro-government militants tried to attack Machado during a 15 July campaign in Vargas and prevented a campaign rally in Petare the next day. On 22 July, Vente Venezuela denounced death threats to Machado by the National Liberation Army (ELN), a far-left Colombian guerrilla group, after her campaign headquarters in Táchira state were painted with messages of "death to María Corina" signed by the ELN. The group denied being the author of the threats.

Venezuelan fact checking outlet Cazadores de Fake News published information relating to an operation to discredit Machado, carried out by a disinformation network which had formerly spread disinformation about Leopoldo López, Juan Guaidó and other opposition politicians.

Henrique Capriles said he was physically assaulted in June by individuals associated with the ruling party. His followers said Chavistas attacked Capriles supporters at an August rally, which they said was the seventh aggression since 29 May. On 27 July, Popular Will denounced that Freddy Superlano's passport was confiscated by authorities at the Colombian border. Delsa Solórzano complained in August of death threats, including messages on social media such as "the collective forces of the ELN are going to kill you".

On the morning of the 22 October primary, in Caracas, colectivos prevented the installation of a voting center and violence with a firearm was registered. Nuns denounced that voters were threatened by colectivos, and that a voting center had to be moved. Armed civilians entered a voting point and pointed at the coordinator, firing several shots. Motorcyclists threw a tear gas canister in the vicinity of a voting center, and two men fired shots into the air at another voting center.

The vice-president of the Regional Board of Monagas state, Dexcy Moya, denounced that colectivos shouted expletives and threats in several voting centers in Maturín.

=== Exclusion of Machado and broken 2023 deal ===
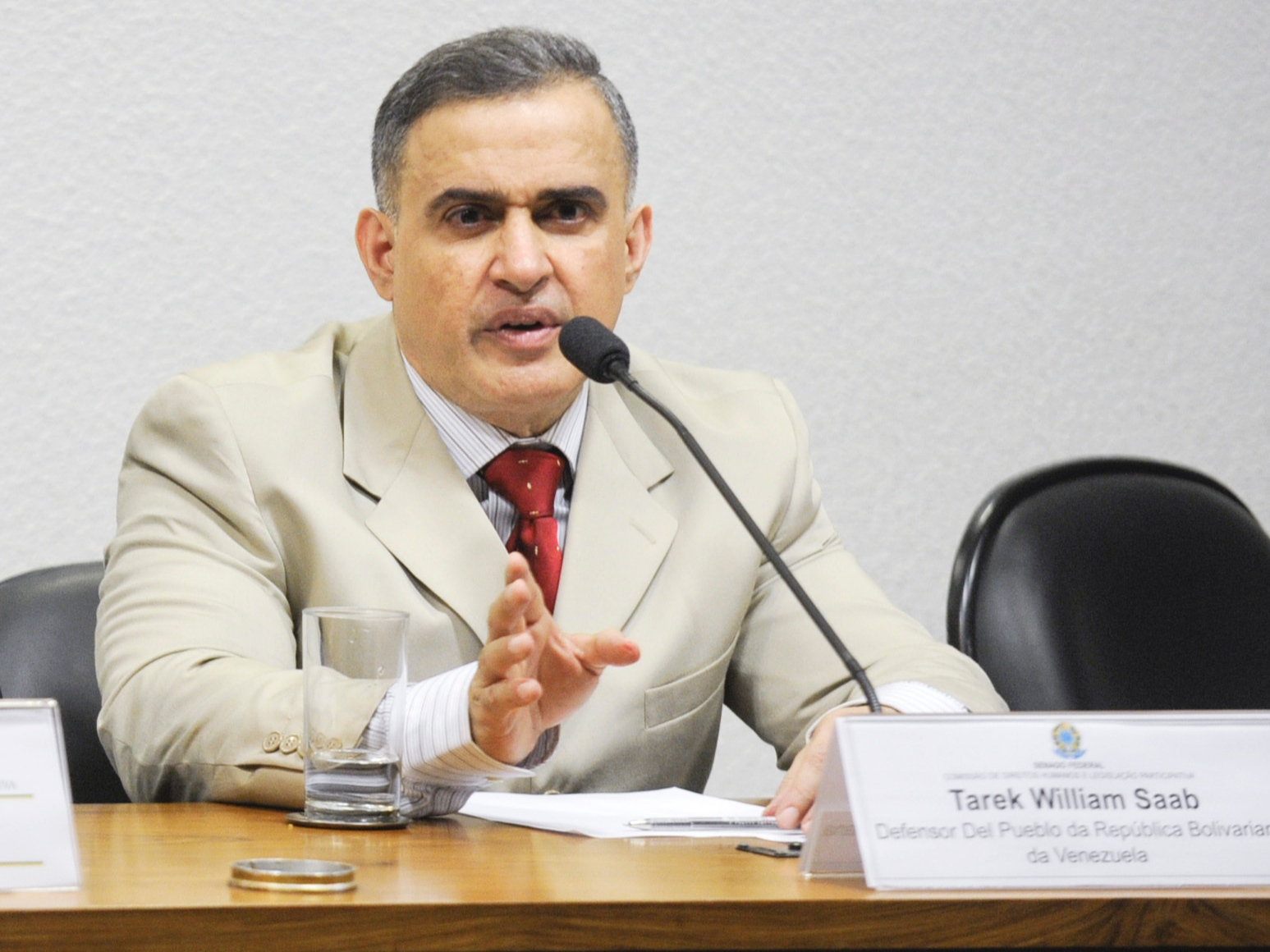
Tarek William Saab, Venezuela's Prosecutor General

María Corina Machado won the October 2023 Unitary Platform primary by a landslide.

In October 2023, the Maduro government and representatives of the opposition signed the Barbados Agreement. Both parties agreed to hold free and fair elections, and accept their results, in exchange for sanctions imposed by the US on petroleum sales to be eased. Despite the agreement, Machado's disqualification was confirmed by the TSJ in January 2024.

Following poor turnout in the 2023 Venezuelan referendum, the chief prosecutor of Venezuela, Tarek William Saab, accused opposition leaders of sabotaging the referendum and issued arrest warrants for 15 of them, with charges such as treason and conspiracy. Saab—under sanctions for multiple alleged offenses—is charged by human rights organizations as "being one of the key people in the regime's efforts to use the Venezuelan justice system as an instrument of political persecution", according to an August 2024 Miami Herald article.

Machado and her supporters said they were attacked by colectivos during a February 2024 campaign rally in Charallave, Miranda state. Machado denounced that the attack occurred in front of security officials, who did not intervene. With the main opposition candidate banned from running, the US stated that Maduro's government had "fallen short" on its commitments, and reinstated some sanctions in April 2024.

Organizations such as the United Nations, the Organization of American States, the European Union, and Human Rights Watch along with several countries and their leaders rejected or condemned Machado's disqualification. Antony Blinken, US Secretary of State, called Machado's disqualification "deeply unfortunate". The European Union High Representative for Foreign Affairs and Security Policy, Josep Borrell, stated that the disqualification "undermines democracy". On 13 July 2023, the European Parliament passed a resolution condemning the disqualification.

=== Election dates and new law ===
The presidential election was scheduled to be held in 2024; according to the Venezuelan Constitution, presidential elections are to take place no later than December in the election year.

The National Election Council (CNE) announced on 5 March 2024, the date of Hugo Chávez's death, that the election would be held on 28 July, the day that would have been his 70th birthday, with filing of candidacies taking place from 21 to 25 March and campaigning from 4 to 25 July.

On 2 April, Delcy Rodríguez presented the Law against Fascism, Neofascism and Similar Expressions to the Maduro-controlled V National Assembly of Venezuela; it passed its first reading that day. The law, if passing a second hearing, would create penalties including increased sentences for organizations that promote what Maduro's government defines as fascism; critics said it would be used to limit opposition to Maduro's government ahead of the July election.

=== Negotiations with United States ===
Direct talks between senior Venezuelan and United States officials that had been stalled since mid-April were restarted in early July, a few weeks prior to the election. According to The Washington Post, the US had been willing to remove all sanctions if Barbados Agreement conditions were met, but the Maduro-controlled Venezuelan Supreme Court made Machado ineligible for the presidency in January 2024. The opposition was not included in the negotiations. Former US ambassador to Venezuela Bill Brownfield stated that the US deal was "looser than it should have been" and "Maduro got, front-ended, all of the benefits he was supposed to get in exchange for promises to comply with in the future. He didn't comply, but he got the stuff he really wanted." Several proposals to grant immunity to the loser of the election have been proposed; while the US restarted talks in the hope of furthering a fair election, the opposition held out "that a strong showing will force Maduro to the table".

== Electoral process ==
The President of Venezuela is elected by plurality in a single round of voting. Electoral authorities constitute one of the five branches of national government according to the 1999 Venezuelan Constitution (Article 136), alongside legislative, executive, judicial, and citizen branches. On 5 March 2024, the National Electoral Council (CNE), the head body of the electoral branch of government, set the presidential election for 28 July and set the electoral schedule:

No.	Event	Dates	
No.	Event	Start	End
1	Call for the process	5 March 2024	
2	Special registration day for the Electoral Registry	18 March 2024	16 April 2024
3	Selection of members of subordinate organizations	20 March 2024	
4	Registration of candidates for the presidency	21 March 2024	25 March 2024
5	Electoral Registration Court	16 April 2024	
6	Election campaigning	4 July 2024	25 July 2024
7	Presidential election	28 July 2024	

Venezuelan elections are overseen by the CNE, with poll workers drafted via a lottery of registered voters. Polling places are equipped with multiple high-tech touch-screen DRE voting machines, one to a "mesa electoral", or voting "table". After the vote is cast, each machine prints out a paper ballot, also known as a voter-verified paper audit trail, which is inspected by the voter and deposited in a ballot box at the machine's table. The voting machines perform in a stand-alone fashion, disconnected from any network until the polls close. Voting session closure at each voting station is determined either by the lack of voters after the lines have emptied, or by the hour, at the discretion of the president of the voting table.

=== Poll witnesses ===
Venezuelan law provides for representatives to observe at each voting place; anyone can witness the electoral process. Each machine prints tally sheets (actas de escrutinio or actas) after the polls close, showing how many votes were received by each candidate, and representatives of the parties receive a copy. After the secretary of the voting table and the witnesses accredited by the CNE agree that the acta tally matches the paper receipts in the ballot boxes, they sign the acta, which is transmitted to the CNE and signed copies are given to the witnesses. CNE typically posts counts, but not images of the tally sheets.

Lester Toledo, a strategist for the opposition, told the Miami Herald that—anticipating fraud in the vote tally—the opposition coordinated for several months before the election to arrange 600,000 volunteers into "command" groups of 10 (comanditos) to include "witnesses for each voting machine, lookouts outside the centers to ensure everything ran smoothly and monitors who made sure the actas were printed and then taken to outside locations to be scanned and, ultimately, uploaded to a centralized cloud". The Associated Press reported that 90,000 opposition party representatives were trained to use a custom-made app to report results and irregularities, and had been instructed not to leave polling centers before obtaining a copy of the tally sheets. Volunteers obtained over 80% of the actas, uploaded 24,576 of them, and tallied the votes by using the QR codes printed on each one.

Following the election, the opposition published a database and searchable website with images of the tally sheets, which registered voters could check and which they provided to international observers.

Parties and countries disputing the government results have urged the CNE to produce the tally sheets to verify its count.

=== Number of voters and voting stations ===
The Electoral Gazette number 1023 of 25 May 2023 reported that Venezuela's Electoral Registry had 21,010,514 registered voters. Of these, 20,675,478 were in Venezuela, 107,836 were abroad, and 227,200 were foreign citizens in the country. The NGO Súmate noted a decline in registered voters over the past six publications in 2021 and 2022, with 84,115 fewer voters since the last publication. They also highlighted that 53,991 voters had objections and couldn't vote, urging them to check their status on the Electoral Council's website and file a claim if necessary.

On election day, 15,767 poll stations had been set up by 08:20 am local time, which amounted to 95% of the total, according to CNE.

=== Observers ===
There were very few independent international election observers.

==== Carter Center ====
On 20 June 2024, the Carter Center agreed to send observers in response to concerns about the lack of sufficient independent monitors, which could undermine the legitimacy of the election results. It sent only "small technical team", according to the BBC of 17 experts to 4 cities.

The Carter Center stated on 30 July that it could not verify the results from the election authorities and that the election "cannot be considered democratic".

==== United Nations ====
On 25 June 2024, the United Nations announced that it would send four monitors, following the opposition's refusal to sign an agreement recognizing the presidential vote's results. The UN team planned to independently produce a confidential report for the Secretary-General of the United Nations, including recommendations for future elections in Venezuela.

The UN released their report publicly on 13 August; it stated that there was a lack of “transparency and integrity measures that are essential to holding credible elections".

==== Other invited participants ====
Following the requirements stipulated in the Barbados Agreement for transparent elections with observers, the Maduro administration invited over 600 international participants. Along with groups such as the United Nations, invitees were members from the Community of Latin American and Caribbean States and the African Union and representatives from Iran, China, Russia and Nicaragua, among others.

BBC News stated that Maduro "welcomed hundreds of guests from countries allied with his government, who he says will 'accompany' the vote." Argentina's Clarin newspaper wrote that some invited envoys "were allowed entry on the condition that they belong to leftist organizations and not criticize the government", stating that "The observers are limited and cannot declare or express their opinion within Venezuela."

According to France 24, "numerous international actors, who were expected to participate in the oversight" stated that "Chavismo has revoked their accreditations, while the opposition denounce[d] obstacles for their guests", adding that "not all actors accredited to verify the functioning of Venezuelan democracy have the same powers" and that the "Carter Center and the United Nations mission were the only missions accredited to carry out mere technical observation work, that is, limited."

Infobae wrote that the guests received as observers were "allies" of the Maduro administration who would not criticize, while others were not allowed to enter.

==== European Union ====
On 28 May 2024, the CNE revoked its invitation for observers from the European Union, citing existing sanctions against Elvis Amoroso, the head of the CNE and a Maduro ally.

After the European Parliament passed a resolution condemning the political disqualification of opposition pre-candidate María Corina Machado, the president of the pro-government National Assembly, Jorge Rodríguez, declared on 13 July 2023 that the Venezuelan government would not allow a European Union electoral observation mission.

==== Argentina and Brazil ====
On 17 July 2024, the Superior Electoral Court (TSE) of Brazil, which had previously rejected the invitation from Maduro's government to send observers, announced a reversal of its decision, stating that it would send two observers.

On 22 July 2024, Brazilian President Lula da Silva stated: "If Maduro wants to contribute for growth to return to Venezuela, for people who left Venezuela to come back and to establish a state of economic growth, he needs to respect the democratic process." Lula, who had previously refused to openly criticize Maduro, said he would send former foreign minister Celso Amorim to watch the election.

On 24 July 2024, TSE announced it would no longer send observers to the election in light of statements by Maduro in which, without proof, he accused the Brazilian electoral system of not being auditable. Nonetheless, Brazil's observation went on as planned.

Former Argentine president Alberto Fernández was uninvited to observe after agreeing with Lula.

==== Other countries ====
Spanish left-wing parties Podemos, United Left, Galician Nationalist Bloc and EH Bildu sent observers. Officials from Spain (ten members of its parliament), Portugal, and Colombia (senator Angelica Lozano) said they were denied entry to Venezuela days before the election.

A Copa Airlines flight from Panama bound for Caracas the day before the vote with former presidents Mireya Moscoso (Panama), Miguel Angel Rodriguez (Costa Rica), Jorge Quiroga (Bolivia) and Vicente Fox (Mexico), as well as Marta Lucia Ramirez (former Colombian vice president), was unable to depart Panama until the former officials deplaned.

Chilean Senators Felipe Kast and Rojo Edwards were deported by Venezuelan authorities a day after arriving to observe the vote. Francisco Paoltroni, president of the Foreign Affairs Committee of the Argentine Senate, invited by the opposition for the election, was also deported. Former Mayor of Bogotá, Claudia López, was also expelled from Venezuela after arriving to observe the election. Uruguayan deputy Pablo Viana was deported from Venezuela after being invited by the opposition to attend the election.

Colombia was invited but did not send observers, with officials stating that the timing of the electoral process was inadequate for technical preparations.

== Candidates ==
=== United Socialist Party of Venezuela ===
On 16 March 2024, the United Socialist Party of Venezuela (PSUV) announced that incumbent Maduro would be their candidate in the presidential election, making it his third run for a six-year term. Maduro officially registered his candidacy on 25 March.

Maduro stated in July that there would be a bloodbath or civil war if he lost the election, and that his party would win "by hook or by crook".

=== Unitary Platform ===
The preliminary winner of the 22 October 2023 Unitary Platform presidential primaries was Machado, sweeping more than 90% of the vote. On 23 October, the second electoral bulletin of the National Primary Commission stated that with 92.65% counted, Machado won more than 90% of the votes and would be the candidate for the Unitary Platform for the 2024 presidential election.

After her disqualification by the TSJ, on 22 March 2024, Machado announced that historian and professor Corina Yoris would be the replacement candidate.

Yoris was unable to officially register in the election; Unitary Platform representatives said that the electoral commission had blocked her registration. Following outcry from countries including the US, Brazil, Colombia, and Guatemala the Unitary Platform registered former diplomat Edmundo González as its temporary candidate pending the selection of another one.

=== A New Era withdraws ===
Zulia Governor Manuel Rosales, founder of A New Era party, launched a last-minute candidacy in March, taking the Unitary Platform by surprise, although he indicated he would cede his position to a unified opposition candidate. Rosales is known as a more moderate opposition candidate who has negotiated with the Maduro government; he recognized Maduro's contested 2018 election and condemned sanctions on Venezuela enacted by the United States. In what an Americas Quarterly article described as "Venezuela's long-standing political crisis", the appearance of a candidate "distrusted by others in the opposition as a pro-system contender" seemed to lower the chances a united opposition could defeat Maduro. According to an article published by Deutsche Welle, his candidacy led to an "uproar" in which "Machado accused him of treason".

On 19 April 2024, a day before the deadline to register an opposition candidate, Omar Barboza, executive secretary of the PUD and president of A New Era, announced that, after a unanimous vote in support of a unity candidate, Rosales would withdraw from the race and endorse Edmundo González, uniting the PUD around a single candidate.

=== Major candidates ===
Candidate	Party and Coalition	Slogan	Ref.
Edmundo González	Independent (Ind.); Unitary Platform (PUD)	Edmundo para el mundo!	
Nicolás Maduro	United Socialist Party of Venezuela (PSUV); Great Patriotic Pole (GPPSB)	#ElQueVaEsNicolás	

=== Other candidates ===
The Democratic Alliance did not participate in the primary.

Eleven candidates without significant representation were registered following the Maduro administration's veto of opposition candidates Machado and Corina. Authorities allowed the registration of candidates considered to be collaborators, false opposition, and politicians aligned with the Bolivarian strategy for the July 2024 presidential election, while blocking genuine opposition candidates. Among these candidates are individuals with ties to Chavismo and diverse figures such as a comedian and an evangelical pastor.

Luis Eduardo Martínez, a deputy for Acción Democrática, has held positions as governor and councilor. Daniel Ceballos, former mayor of San Cristóbal, has been favored by the Supreme Tribunal of Justice (TSJ). Antonio Ecarri, with a background in education and public management, has declined multiple candidacies in his political career. Juan Carlos Alvarado, Secretary-General of COPEI, was appointed by the TSJ and has validated Chavismo control of the Parliament. Benjamín Rausseo, a comedian and businessman, has made previous attempts for public office. Javier Bertucci, an evangelical pastor and deputy, has a criminal record related to diesel smuggling. José Brito, a former member of Primero Justicia, has been accused of corruption and collaborating with the administration to prevent the re-election of Juan Guaidó. Claudio Fermín, with extensive political experience and positions in the Executive Branch, has been an unsuccessful presidential candidate several times. Luis Ratti, a businessman and preacher, requested the suspension of opposition primaries. Enrique Márquez, a former rector of the National Electoral Council (CNE), has held seats in the National Assembly and served as its vice president (2016–2017, after the electoral victory of the opposition).

Candidate	Party and/or Coalition	Slogan	Ref.
Luis Eduardo Martínez	Democratic Action (AD)	United we live better	
José Brito	Venezuela First (PV)	La Oportunidad	
Antonio Ecarri Angola	Pencil Alliance (Lápiz)	Eficiencia, Soluciones y Oportunidades	
Enrique Márquez	Centrados en la Gente (CG) transl. People-centered	¡Llegó la hora! El cambio va	
Benjamín Rausseo	National Democratic Confederation (CONDE); Slogan: With Rausseo, I stand up!	Pasa la página	
Javier Bertucci	Hope for Change (El Cambio); Slogan: Yes, there is hope!	¡Sí, hay esperanza!	
Claudio Fermín	Solutions for Venezuela (SPV)	El profe Claudio Fermín hace latir la esperanza	
Daniel Ceballos	Country Renewal and Hope Assembly (AREPA)	Esperanza para nuestra gente	

== Conduct and irregularities ==
=== Disqualification of political parties ===
On 17 March, the CNE disqualified 16 political parties from nominating candidates in the presidential election, after not reaching 1% of the minimum votes in the 2021 Venezuelan regional elections, without offering a validation or repair process required by electoral law. The parties disqualified included: Adelante, Centrados, Única, National Convergence, Suma País, Encuentro Ciudadano, Generación Independiente (Gente), Partido Unión y Entendimiento (Puente), Movimiento al Socialismo (Venezuela) (MAS), Fuerza del Cambio (FDC), Nueva Visión para mi País (Nuvipa), Unidad Política Popular 89 (UPP-89), Unión y Progreso (Venezuela), Prociudadanos (LPC), Compromiso País (Compa).

=== Blocking of the CNE portal ===
Following the end of the registration period for candidates on 25 March, Machado said that the Unitary Platform was prevented from registering Corina Yoris's candidacy, and Rosales said that he did not represent the Unitary Platform. Shortly afterwards, the CNE, following international pressure, authorized a 12-hour extension to register candidates, which enabled the Unitary Platform card to provisionally register its candidate, Edmundo González.

=== Obstruction in overseas voting ===
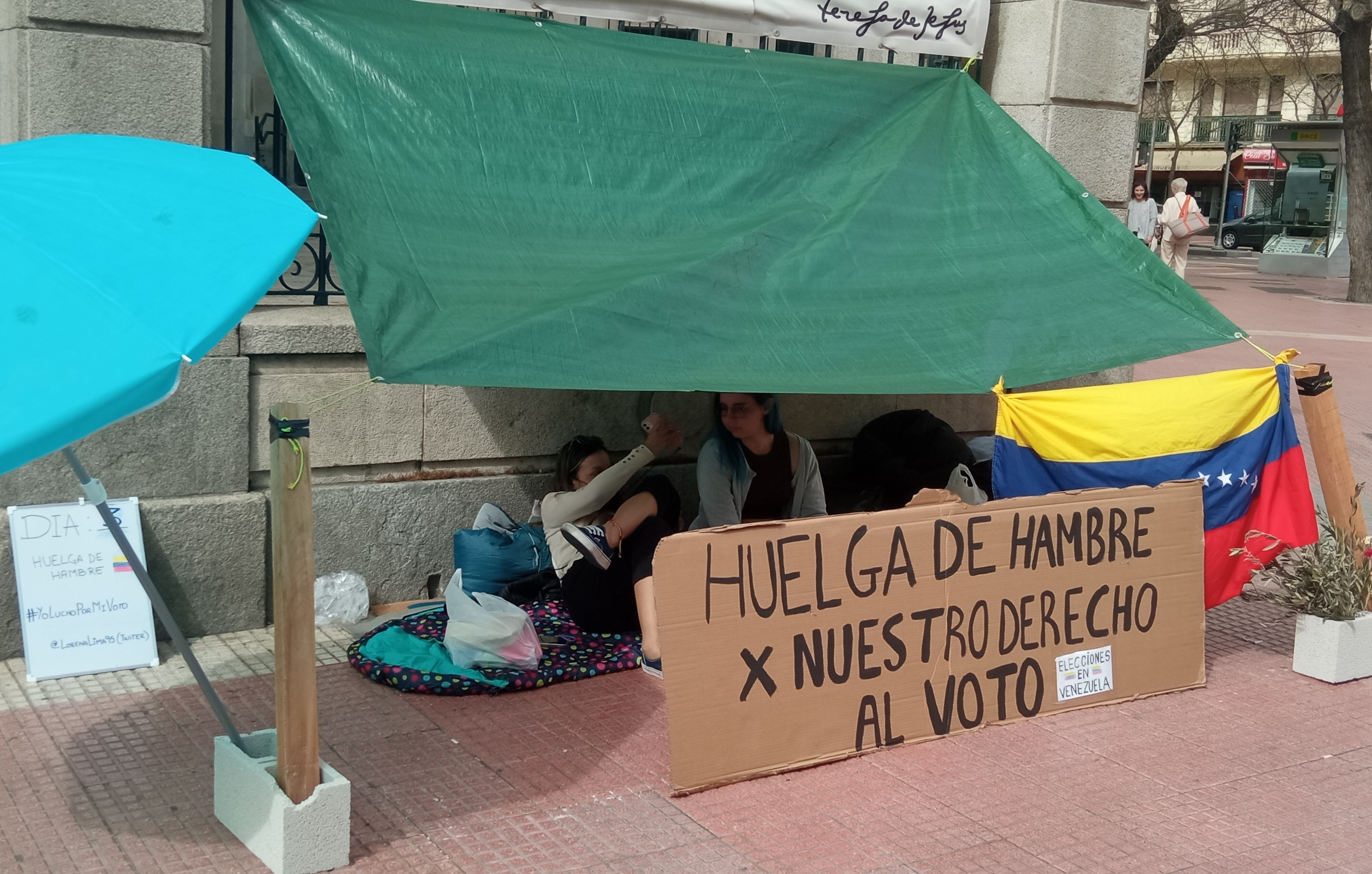
Hunger strike in Madrid demanding the opening of the Electoral Registry abroad

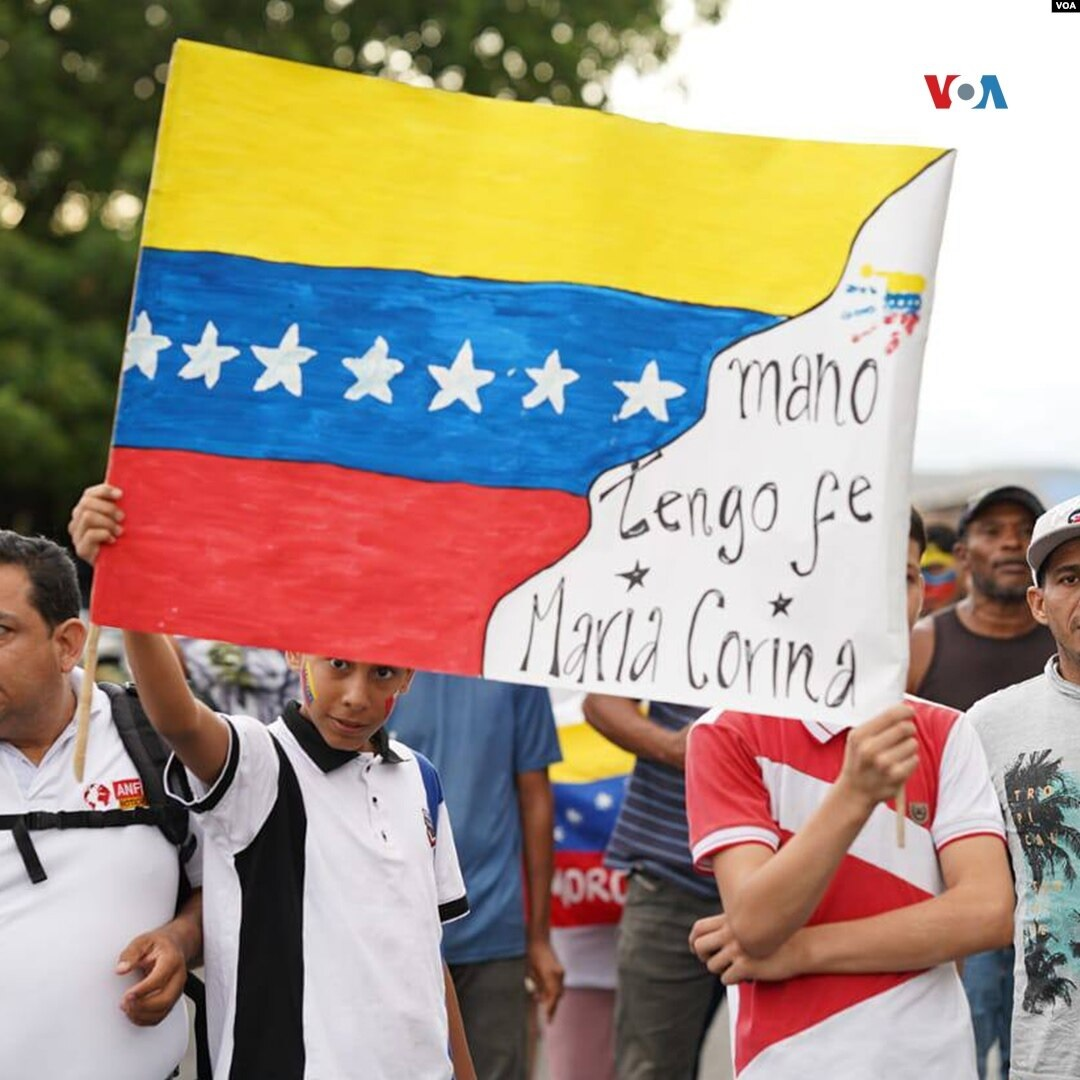
Venezuelan opposition on the Colombian side of the Simón Bolívar International Bridge

The requirements for voters to register abroad were restrictive and not contemplated in the constitution. Requirements included a current passport (one of the most expensive in the world to obtain) and having permanent residence; the majority of voters abroad had Temporary Permission to Stay or Permission for Temporary Protection, and did not have residence, consequently, very few were registered.

On 16 April, registration and updating of the Electoral Registry of Venezuela concluded. With approximately 7.7 million Venezuelans abroad, 80% of whom have the right to vote, the CNE only authorized some consulates to hold registration; many Venezuelans could not register because there was no authorized consulate or it was very far from their location. In many of the consulates, delays were observed and the CNE registered little political interest in solving the problem; the majority of voters abroad register an opposition tendency. David Smolansky, former mayor of El Hatillo, accused the administration of blocking the registration of at least 4.5 million Venezuelans abroad through "a policy of systematic and generalized discrimination" as well as its "requirements to register and change residence address" that led to "queues at the consulates".

The special day for voter registration abroad was marred by delays in the process of up to five days, as occurred in Spain, Argentina, Peru and Chile. Citizens complained that they were not able to register or update their data.

According to a 2 May preliminary CNE report, of the almost 7.7 million Venezuelans abroad, only 69,189 were allowed to vote, of which only 6,020 managed to change their voting center in Venezuela to the country where they reside. The number of new people registered to vote abroad was negligible due to the requirements imposed by the CNE and the Foreign Ministry: in Mexico 69 people managed to register as new voters, in Spain 97, in Argentina 27, in Colombia only 25, in Ecuador 13 and in Peru only six. The exact total number of citizens able to vote was 21,402,220.

In mid-June the Inter-American Commission on Human Rights (IACHR) demanded that Venezuela "adopt the necessary measures" to guarantee the right to vote for compatriots abroad for the presidential elections, stating that "a genuine commitment to democracy requires that the State immediately reestablish the separation and independence of public powers".

=== Harassment, intimidation, and other irregularities ===
Along with the issues in overseas voter registration and voting that "effectively disenfranchised most of the migrant population", the Carter Center listed other problems with the electoral process. Checkpoints were placed near polling stations to intimidate voters. Individuals and companies providing services to the opposition were harassed and intimidated. The TSJ replaced the leadership of opposition political parties with those who supported Maduro. The Maduro campaign frequently used government vehicles and social programs to promote their campaign.

The New York Times stated that irregularities on election day throughout the country "provoked fury". Intimidation of voters with violence and threats, and by state forces, included an example in Cumaná, where dozens of armed authorities lined up at a polling station. In one city, voters reported that government security forces tried to replace designated witnesses with their own personnel. The Venezuelan Electoral Observatory said that 17,000 voters found their polling place changed at the last minute; a New York Times reporter was detained after trying to enter an unofficial polling place. Voting centers stayed open past the required closing time to allow Maduro supporters to round up more votes. Some voting centers refused to print the vote tallies as required by law. Between January and 26 July 2024, Foro Penal said that 135 individuals associated with the González campaign had been arrested.

According to Lester Toledo, as the polls were about to close, "he received reports from about 90% of the volunteers that the government had ordered election workers to not print the actas. But after a tense period of back-and-forth, soldiers with the national guard allowed most volunteers to take the actas home anyway." Inside the CNE as the machine vote tallies were being received, the two witnesses from the opposition were denied entry, and according to the Miami Herald, "Enrique Marquez, one of a handful of presidential candidates, said his own campaign monitor was allowed in the room and reported that the Council did not print the results of the election."

=== Violence ===
Pares (the Colombian Peace & Reconciliation Foundation) released three reports on violence that occurred during the elections. The reports encompassed the time periods:

1. 5 March to 25 May
2. 26 May to 26 June
3. 27 June to 28 July

In the first report, Pares stated there were 25 incidents with 38 victims, of which 17 were affiliated with Vente Venezuela. Pares found Venezuelan armed and security forces responsible for the majority, and stated that "no possible victims of political-electoral violence who are part of the official parties or the government bloc of Venezuela were found". In its third report (27 June to 28 July) Pares stated that most of the victims were "members of the main opposition parties", along with 10 journalists, and that over 91% of the violent acts that affected 129 victims were committed by Venezuelan security forces.

=== CNE rectors ===
In August 2023, the NGO Súmate denounced that at least 92 candidates for rectors of the CNE were linked to Chavismo, pointing out that Article 9 of the Organic Law of Electoral Processes prohibits members of the council to have any political affiliation. Sumate also stated that one of the nominees had been convicted for homicide and extortion in 1998, that 46 candidates repeated the candidacy after running in 2021 and that by that time they were deputies of the pro-government National Assembly. On 15 August, the pro-government National Assembly declared itself in permanent session to appoint the new CNE rectors.

=== Censorship ===
TechRadar reported that websites, including Wikipedia and voting information websites, were blocked in Venezuela beginning on 28 July.

VE Sin Filtro, a non-governmental organization that monitors internet censorship, reported that more than 60 news providers are blocked in Venezuela, including 17 new sites that were blocked after the election campaigns started.

=== Ex Clé ===
The sanctioned Argentine firm Ex Clé provided the technological platform for voting in the presidential election. Significant transactions moving from Venezuela through Ex Clé's accounts in banks in Uruguay and the United States triggered alerts from Argentina's Anti-Money Laundering Unit. The firm, which owns the voting machines and electronic counting software, came under suspicion, according to Infobae, when the Argentine anti-money laundering unit reported "the triangulation of funds (by EX Clé) through third countries without apparent economic justification" and "transfers abroad whose destinations could be questionable", among other concerns according to Argentine Law No. 25,246 on money laundering.

== Endorsements ==
After she was barred from running, Machado's endorsement of González was an important factor in the election as he gained support from even former socialist supporters of the government, along with support from the Machado-led opposition.

== Opinion polls ==
As of July 2024, most polls favored González to win by a wide margin; this trend was particularly true from the higher-quality pollsters in Venezuela.

=== Alleged manipulation of polls ===
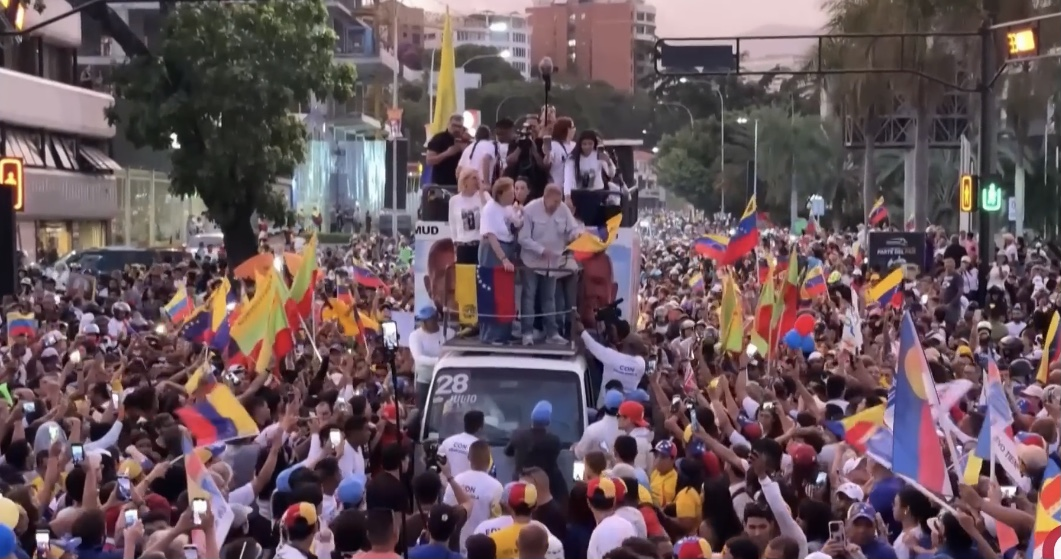
Election campaign of González

During the run-up to the election, several news outlets reported on the proliferation of polls favoring Maduro published since May 2024 by previously unknown polling firms, fuelling concerns that some polls were being used as propaganda tools by Chavismo. These poll results differed significantly from those published by more traditional pollsters, which showed Maduro trailing.

According to Medianálisis, Efecto Cocuyo, Cazadores de Fake News and Probox, working with the Latin American Center for Investigative Journalism, these polls were being used to discredit opposition candidates. Polls showing Maduro ahead were predominantly disseminated by media outlets claimed to be pro-Maduro, such as Globovisión, El Universal, Venezuela News, Correo del Orinoco and NotiTarde.

Six pollsters consistently placed opposition candidate González in first place, while others placed Maduro in front. Well-known pollsters in the Venezuelan political sphere, such as Datanálisis, Datincorp, Delphos, and Consultores 21, along with the emerging Poder y Estrategia, indicated that González had more than 50% of voting intentions. Results by lesser-known firms Hinterlaces, ICS Latam, IMC Orientación, and DataViva, among others, showed Maduro with between 54% and 70% of votes. Results by CECA Consultores showed a technical tie slightly favoring the opposition.

On 28 May, Colombian newspaper El Tiempo named IdeaDatos and Data Viva as examples of suspicious pollsters. NTN24 singled out Insight in June 2024, writing that "Eight of ten [recent] polls give the winner to the opposition candidate, Edmundo González Urrutia, and the only two that give victory to ... Maduro, are unknown firms and their social media accounts are recent", adding that IdeaDatos and PoliAnalítico "actively campaign for Nicolás Maduro".

Venezuelan independent journalism website Efecto Cocuyo published several detailed exposés of pollsters, alleging faulty methodology, systematic bias in favor of Maduro, and repeated dissemination of their polls by pro-Maduro outlets. Polling firms alleged to be unreliable include IdeaDatos, CMIDE, Parametrica, Hinterlaces, IMC Orientación, and ICS Latam.

=== Exit polls ===
An exit poll by Edison Research—which, according to The Guardian, "conducts high-profile election polling in the US and other countries"—gave González 65% of the vote and Maduro 31%.

Pollster	Date conducted	Sample size	Nicolás Maduro PSUV	Edmundo González ConVzla
Edison Research	28 July 2024	6,846	31%	65%
Meganalisis	28 July 2024		14%	65%

=== After the official confirmation of candidates ===
Pollster	Date(s) conducted	Sample size	Maduro PSUV	González MUD	Martínez AD	Ecarri Lápiz	Rausseo CONDE	Fermín SPV	Bertucci El Cambio	Brito PV	Ceballos AREPA	Márquez CG	Others	Undecided	None/Not voting
28 July 2024		Presidential election													
25 July 2024		End of the electoral campaigns													
21 July 2024		Closing of the legal period for polling													
Poder y Estrategia	15–20 July 2024	1,100	21%	64%	1%	2%	2%	1%	2%	0.2%	0.4%	0.4%	-	6%	-
Hercon Consultores	19 July 2024	1,200	29.8%	63.3%	0.8%	1.2%	1.5%	-	0.6%	-	-	-	0.5%	2.3%	-
4 July 2024		Start of the electoral campaigns													
Hercon Consultores	20 June – 3 July 2024	1,200	28.1%	62.1%	0.6%	1.3%	2.6%	-	0.5%	-	-	-	0.4%	1.5%	3%
ORC Consultores	22–28 June 2024	1,177	14.5%	58.6%	-	-	-	-	-	-	-	-	4.3%	22.6%	
Meganalisis	17–22 June 2024	1,123	11.3%	68.4%	-	1.8%	0.7%	-	1.5%	-	-	0.2%	0.6%	8.3%	7.2%
Hercon Consultores	10 June 2024	1,000	24.1%	61.1%	0.8%	2.8%	4.5%	-	0.7%	-	-	-	1%	2.5%	2.5%
Meganalisis	16–23 May 2024	1,116	9.8%	61.1%	-	1.1%	0.9%	-	1.3%	-	-	0.3%	0.7%	16.7%	8.1%
Hercon Consultores	3 May 2024	1,000	22.5%	58.8%	2%	3.1%	-	-	-	-	-	-	1.2%	2.2%	10.2%
Consultores 21	23 April – 2 May 2024	1,004	32%	50%	-	5%	13%	-	11%	-	-	4%	-	-	-
Datincorp	28 April 2024	1,200	18%	50%	1.75%	0.92%	3.42%	1.5%	2.25%	0.33%	0.25%	0.75%	N/A		
Meganalisis	25–28 April 2024	1,009	11.2%	32.4%	-	0.9%	1.1%	-	-	-	-	-	2.0%	33.1%	19.3%
More Consulting	19 April 2024	-	21.6%	45.8%	-	-	-	-	-	-	-	-	-	-	-

=== Before the official confirmation of candidates ===
Pollster	Date(s) conducted	Margin of error	Sample size	Maduro PSUV	Machado PUD	Yoris PUD	González PUD	Rausseo Ind.	Rosales UNT	Capriles PJ	Guaidó VP	Others	Undecided	None/Not voting
22 April 2024		Luis Ratti and Juan Carlos Alvarado withdraw from the presidential race, endorse Luis Eduardo Martínez												
19 April 2024		Manuel Rosales withdraws from the presidential race, endorses Edmundo González. Machado and Yoris also endorse González												
Meganalisis	2–7 April 2024	3.43%	1,002	13.2%	-	-	-	1.3%	5.8%	-	-	2.9%	14.7%	62.1%
Meganalisis	2–7 April 2024	3.43%	1,002	10.4%	-	37.9%	-	1.4%	2.5%	-	-	3.4%	27.2%	17.2%
Meganalisis	2–7 April 2024	3.43%	1,002	9.4%	70.8%	-	-	1.2%	2.2%	-	-	2.2%	5.1%	9.1%
27 March 2024		The Unitary Platform registers Edmundo González Urrutia as a temporary candidate												
26 March 2024		The National Electoral Council prevents Corina Yoris from registering as presidential candidate. Manuel Rosales registers												
22 March 2024		María Corina Machado announces that Corina Yoris will take Machado's place as the nominee of the Unitary Platform												
Meganalisis	7–13 March 2024	3.41%	1,010	7.4%	69.1%		-	0.8%	-	-	-	1.3%	12.8%	8.6%
Datincorp	25 February 2024	2.83%	1,200	13.92%	55%		-	4.83%	-	-	-	3.25%	8.58%	14.92%
26 January 2024		The Supreme Tribunal of Justice of Venezuela upholds the ban of Maria Corina Machado, disqualifying her												
Meganalisis	22–31 January 2024		1,029	7.9%	71.80%		-	0.9%	-	-	-	1.0%	10.3%	8.1%
Meganalisis	24–28 November 2023	N/A	896	7.90%	72.70%		-	0.6%	-	-	-	0.1%	10.2%	8.4%
22 October 2023		Maria Corina Machado wins the 2023 Unitary Platform presidential primaries												
Meganalisis	31 July 2023	N/A	1,013	12.10%	50.10%		-	0.9%	-	-	-	0.1%	23.9%	12.9%
Meganalisis	31 July 2023	N/A	1,013	11.50%	32.88%		-	-	-	4.41%	-	13.01%	24.65%	13.55%
30 June 2023		Venezuela's controller general bars María Corina Machado from running for political office for 15 years												
Meganalisis	30 June 2023	N/A	1,011	6.90%	31.50%		-	-	-	5.51%	-	1.21%	25.23%	
Datincorp	5 February 2023	N/A	1,192	15.69%	16.86%		-	11.91%	9.23%	6.8%	2.27%	5.7%	7.47%	24.08%

=== By party affiliation ===
Pollster	Date	Margin of error	Sample Size	Great Patriotic Pole (Chavismo)	Unitary Platform	Other	Undecided	Not voting
Datincorp	25 February 2024	N/A	1,198	14.4%	53%	-	11%	21.5%
Meganalisis	31 July 2023	-	1,013	11.5%	76.1%	-	12.4%	N/A
Consultores 21	29 March 2023	-	1,500	25.4%	55.1%	-	10.3%	9.2%
Hercon Consultores	3 February 2023	-	1,000	17.2%	20.1%	-	62.7%	N/A

== Results ==
According to The New York Times, "Maduro was declared the winner in a presidential vote ... marred by irregularities"; these irregularities included "polling places [that] refused to release paper tallies of the electronic vote count, and ... widespread reports of fraud and voter intimidation", results that varied "wildly" from public opinion polls and voting center samples, "major irregularities and problems at those voting centers", and blocking of legal monitors from polling places.

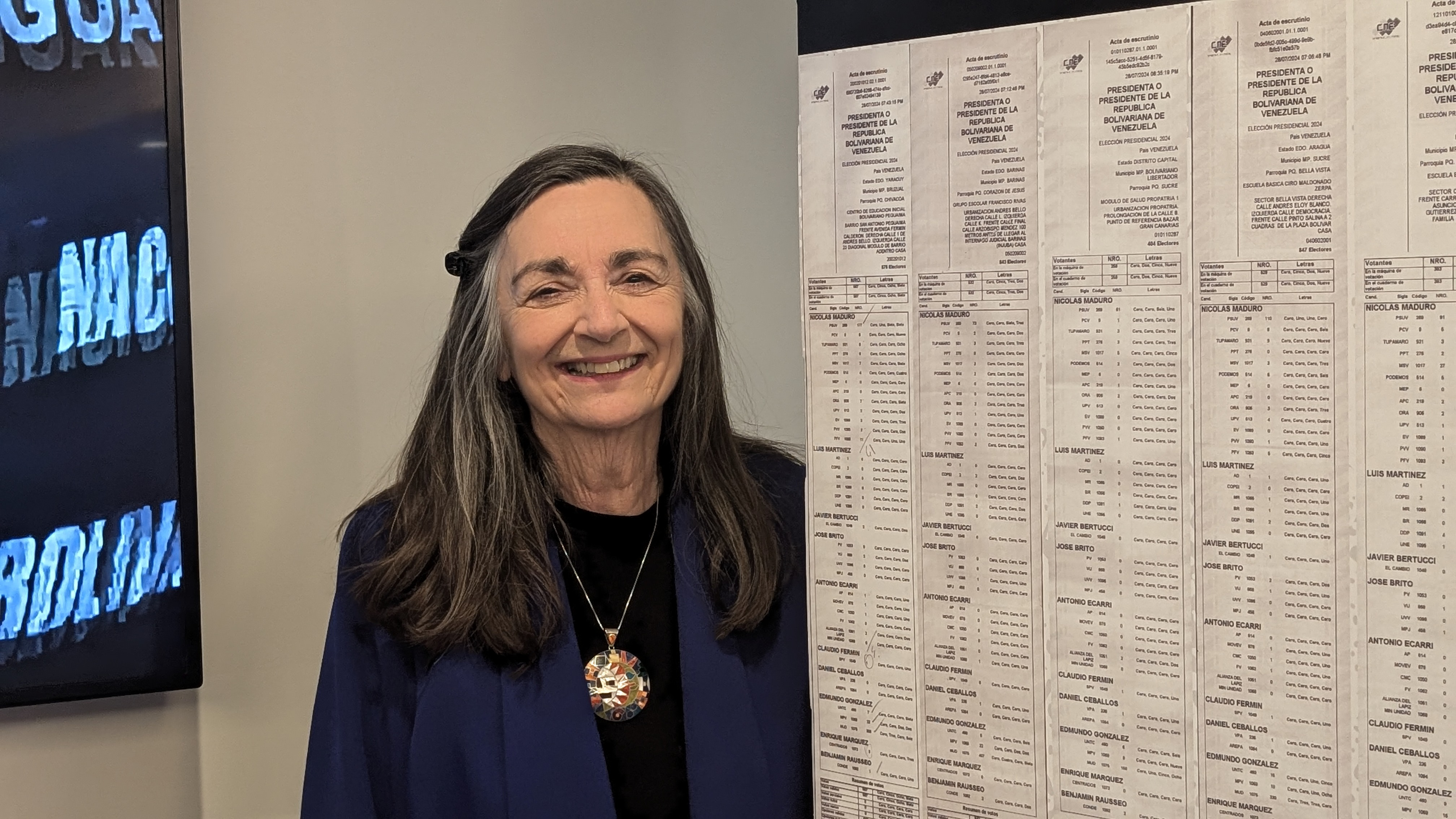
Jennie Lincoln, Americas Program director at the Carter Center, with samples of vote tallies

The Carter Center, which sent a small team of observers, stated that there was a "complete lack of transparency" and that the election "did not meet international standards", "cannot be considered democratic", and had occurred in "an environment of restricted freedoms" and "clear bias" from electoral authorities; they could not verify the results from the electoral authority.

The United Nations sent a small panel of experts who spent a month in Caracas, and was expected to produce only a confidential report for internal purposes. It released its report publicly on 13 August, and according to the Associated Press, "harshly criticized" the CNE for declaring Maduro the winner before having table-level results. The report stated that the premature declaration of a winner "had no precedent in contemporary democratic elections", and that the election process lacked “basic transparency and integrity". It concluded that the tally sheets produced by the opposition appeared to have security features that indicate "a key transparency safeguard may be available, as intended, with respect to any officially released results". Venezuela's Foreign Minister Yván Gil rejected the report as false and called it part of "a series of lies" and a "far right" plot.

=== Tally sheets ===
Opposition groups stated their intent the day after the election to publish the detailed electoral results in the form of scanned copies of the tally sheets (actas de escrutinio) and other digital formats on a website resultadospresidencialesvenezuela2024.com where registered voters can check the results for their place of voting. According to La Patilla, Venezuelan authorities blocked access to the server on Venezuelan internet providers. La Patilla recommended the use of VPNs for accessing the website. The opposition reported that, on 31 July, more than 44 million website attacks were prevented, with more than 32 million users consulting the database in 24 hours.

On 1 August, presidents Gabriel Boric of Chile, Gustavo Petro of Colombia, Lula da Silva of Brazil, and Andrés Manuel López Obrador of Mexico called for the CNE to publish its version of the tally sheets and the full vote counts. The following day, the Supreme Tribunal of Justice asked the CNE to provide the nationwide tally sheets and summed reports within three calendar days.

=== Parallel vote tabulation ===
In the AltaVista PVT project with a preregistered statistical sampling method of parallel vote tabulation, a team of statisticians applied their method by photographing results from 997 polling stations and inferring the national vote shares. They found 66.1% for González and 31.4% for Maduro, each with an error margin of 0.5%. The participation rate was estimated as 60.1%.

=== Turnout and voter changes ===
According to The New York Times, government officials believed that "a combination of high turnout among loyalists and suppressing the vote for the opposition" would assure a win for the incumbent party. But many voters who traditionally had supported the government had left Venezuela or had "turned from Mr. Maduro", so that "the financial muscle of an oil state to bring supporters to the polls" failed to produce the desired result. Efforts by the Maduro government to revive economic growth by privatizing the economy led to reduced public spending, including the handouts and social services traditionally used to mobilize the vote. In previous campaigns, one PSUV organizer explained, the government "gave out everything from motorbikes to refrigerators", while in this election campaign, "all she got was boxes of poor-quality food and house paint".

=== Results announced by the National Electoral Council (CNE) ===
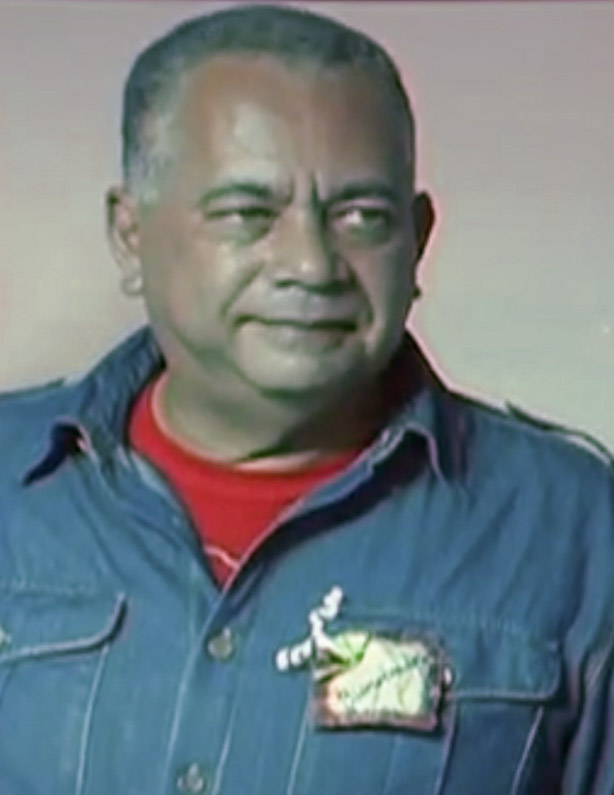
Elvis Amoroso, head of CNE, Venezuelan's electoral body

The CNE announced initial results on 29 July. As of January 2026, the CNE has still not released any tally sheets or voter data to support its results. On 29 July, CNE head Elvis Amoroso alleged that CNE had been the victim of a cyberattack and accused the opposition of orchestrating it; no evidence was presented. On both 31 July and 1 August, the CNE announced that it would release the second bulletin of the results. On 2 August, the CNE announced a second bulletin of votes, still in favor of Maduro, but still without tally sheets or other polling station level details. Jennie Lincoln, who headed the Carter Center observation of the election, rejected the results again as not being transparent, and stated that Venezuela was not able to provide individual table tallies as they had done so in past elections.

Journalists from The Washington Post analyzed the tally sheet scans published online by the opposition, and looked at "hundreds" of physical paper tally sheets stored by the opposition in secret locations. The journalists interviewed several of the people whose signatures appear on the physical tally sheets, and stated that the physical tally sheets appear to be authentic. They state that the physical tally sheets match the corresponding online scans. The journalists analysed 23,720 of the online tally sheets—those whose QR codes they were successfully able to extract from the images, constituting 97% of the online total, claiming that González won 67% of the vote and Maduro 30%.

Attorney Juan Carlos Delpino, one of the five CNE rectors, went into hiding after the election. Delpino stated in an interview with The New York Times that he had seen no evidence of a Maduro victory, expressing personal shame that the CNE he had agreed to serve on had "failed the country". Delpino noted irregularities in the election including the absence of published vote tallies from the CNE, and a lack of CNE pre-election meetings that allowed CNE head Amoroso to make "unilateral" decisions.

==== Sequences of zeros in the CNE values ====
Table showing percentages provided by the Consejo Nacional Electoral (CNE) to varying levels of rounding

The CNE's results released on 29 July 2024 reported 5,150,092 votes for Maduro, 4,445,978 votes for González, and 462,704 other votes, for a total of 10,058,774 votes. When converted to percentages, these figures correspond exactly—at a precision of five decimal places—to 51.20000%, 44.20000%, and 4.60000%, respectively. In the 2 August CNE results, the invalid/null vote count is 0.41000% at a precision of 5 decimal places. These sequences of successive zeros were regarded as a possible sign of fraud, with analysts noting that the vote totals appear to have been derived by applying pre-assigned percentages to the total number of votes rather than being the result of independent tabulation.

For the vote counts to correspond to percentages that have zeros in the second to fifth decimal places is an unlikely coincidence, with a probability of around one in a hundred million, as discussed by Kiko Llaneras, a statistician writing in El País, mathematician Terence Tao, and statistician Andrew Gelman. El Espectador interpreted this as likely fraud. Infobae also stated that improbability raised suspicion about the 29 July CNE statement of the results.

Tao described a Bayesian analysis considering the null hypothesis that the 29 July CNE counts are authentic, and the alternative hypothesis that they are fraudulent. He found that the probability of the official counts occurring is "extremely small" in the case of the counts being authentic (the null hypothesis) and that there is a "plausible causal chain ... that leads to an elevated probability" of the official counts occurring for the hypothesis of manipulation (the alternative hypothesis). The causal chain of the manipulation hypothesis is that a decision was made to manipulate the data, officials followed orders to report vote counts based on a given rounded percentage, and other officials raised no objections to the fabricated counts.

On 2 August, Elvis Amoroso made a new statement, asserting that 96.87% of the ballots had been counted, accounting for 12,335,884 valid votes and 50,785 null/invalid votes, giving a total of 12,386,669 votes cast, which corresponds to 0.41000% of null/invalid votes at a precision of 5 decimal places.

Candidate	Party or alliance		Votes	%
Nicolás Maduro	Great Patriotic Pole	PSUV	6,408,844	51.95
Edmundo González	Unitary Platform	Independent	5,326,104	43.18
Luis Eduardo Martínez	Democratic Action		152,360	1.24
Antonio Ecarri	Pencil Alliance		116,421	0.94
Benjamín Rausseo	National Democratic Confederation		92,903	0.75
José Brito	Venezuela First		84,231	0.68
Javier Bertucci	Hope for Change		64,452	0.52
Claudio Fermín	Solutions for Venezuela		40,902	0.33
Enrique Márquez	Centrados en la Gente		29,611	0.24
Daniel Ceballos	Country Renewal and Hope Assembly		20,056	0.16
Total			12,335,884	100.00
Valid votes			12,335,884	99.59
Invalid/blank votes			50,785	0.41
Total votes			12,386,669	100.00
Registered voters/turnout			21,392,464	57.90
Source: Canal N, Efecto Cocuyo

=== Results announced by the Democratic Unitary Platform (PUD) ===
González-to-Maduro vote ratio versus registered voters per mesa; the ratios scatter around one in small voting places and from one to ten in large voting places (PUD data version 1).

A database which allowed Venezuelans to use their national identity card to verify vote tallies was released by the PUD on 30 July, which they said reflected 73% of the votes cast. The database shows scans of the vote tally sheets, with votes cast for each candidate at each voting place gathered during the electoral process. As of 21 August, the government has not released a similar accounting, which the Carter Center said was needed. Opposition groups released a CSV-format file with the polling-station level data for 24,532 polling stations. At the mesa (table) level in version 1 of the tally sheets, 86.60% of the mesas had more votes for González than for Maduro, 0.17% tied exactly, and 13.23% had more votes for Maduro.

An independent analysis of the count released by PUD was conducted by the Associated Press and corroborated the opposition results. The Associated Press stated that it could not independently verify the authenticity of the published tally sheets. On 3 August 2024, the Colombian civil society network Electoral Observation Mission (MOE) published its analysis of the PUD results, finding them fully self-consistent. MOE called for the CNE to publish the polling station tally sheets and audit the full chain of transmission of information. MOE stated that González necessarily won the election based on the publicly available tally sheets analysed by MOE (73.1% of the total), since the missing sheets were too few to give a majority to Maduro, even if 100% of the votes on the missing tally sheets were for Maduro.

A study from political scientist Dorothy Kronick, described by The New York Times as "an expert on Venezuelan electoral data at the University of California, Berkeley", stated that the opposition data "almost certainly reflects actual votes cast".

==== Mebane statistical analysis of opposition vote data ====
Results by parish announced by the PUD

A working paper published by Walter Mebane, that used statistical tools for electoral forensics, found no evidence of incremental or extreme fraud in the opposition-published results. He found no evidence of incremental or extreme fraud in the election minutes as published by the opposition. Using these minutes, he calculated that the probability of no fraud having occurred in the opposition tallies (π_{1}) at 99.97%. He also calculated that the probability of incremental fraud having occurred (π_{2}) at 0.0185% and that extreme fraud having occurred (π_{3}) at 0.0114%.

Mebane identified only two polling stations where fraud may have occurred; however, using a 99.5% credibility interval, it is not possible to state that this occurred in these two polls. Mebane's paper compared the results of other elections in Venezuela between 2000 and 2013. The tallies provided by the opposition in the 2024 elections have the highest probability of no fraud.

Candidate	Party or alliance		Votes	%
Edmundo González	Unitary Platform	Independent	7,443,584	67.05
Nicolás Maduro	Great Patriotic Pole	PSUV	3,385,155	30.49
Luis Eduardo Martínez	Democratic Action		87,797	0.79
Antonio Ecarri	Pencil Alliance		52,177	0.47
Benjamín Rausseo	National Democratic Confederation		39,585	0.36
Enrique Márquez	Centrados en la Gente		26,491	0.24
José Brito	Venezuela First		22,459	0.20
Javier Bertucci	Hope for Change		20,842	0.19
Claudio Fermín	Solutions for Venezuela		12,929	0.12
Daniel Ceballos	Country Renewal and Hope Assembly		10,783	0.10
Total			11,101,802	100.00
Valid votes			11,101,802	99.99
Invalid/blank votes			1,241	0.01
Total votes			11,103,043	100.00
Registered voters/turnout			18,504,975	60.00
Source: https://resultadosconvzla.com version 3 (full csv source; registered voters Archived 9 January 2025 at the Wayback Machine)

States won by Edmundo González (24)
States won by Nicolás Maduro (0)

State	Edmundo González		Nicolás Maduro		Others		Difference		Blank/Null		Total/Participation^{†}	
State	Votes	%	Votes	%	Votes	%	Votes	%	Votes	%	Votes	%
Amazonas	27,219	59.44	17,374	37.94	1,199	2.62	9,845	21.50	3	0.01	45,792	60.44
Anzoátegui	420,436	66.50	194,786	30.81	16,968	2.68	225,650	35.69	62	0.01	632,190	61.06
Apure	134,935	62.96	75,297	35.13	4,083	1.91	59,638	27.83	28	0.01	214,315	59.72
Aragua	487,938	67.43	212,285	29.34	23,376	3.23	275,653	38.09	99	0.01	723,599	60.06
Barinas	282,585	74.49	90,236	23.78	6,562	1.73	192,349	50.70	35	0.01	379,383	62.76
Bolívar	343,845	71.22	126,557	26.22	12,360	2.56	217,288	45.01	73	0.02	482,762	58.00
Carabobo	466,744	70.60	175,133	26.49	19,230	2.91	291,611	44.11	58	0.01	661,107	58.17
Cojedes	109,083	62.83	60,242	34.70	4,285	2.47	48,841	28.13	11	0.01	173,610	66.25
Delta Amacuro	30,074	53.44	24,797	44.07	1,402	2.49	5,277	9.38	10	0.02	56,273	55.49
Capital District	505,956	64.06	256,288	32.45	27,633	3.50	249,668	31.61	121	0.02	789,877	59.28
Falcón	301,236	70.77	114,586	26.92	9,860	2.32	186,650	43.85	55	0.01	425,682	61.07
Guárico	220,995	64.02	116,636	33.79	7,556	2.19	104,359	30.23	35	0.01	345,187	66.41
La Guaira	97,550	60.87	57,761	36.04	4,957	3.09	39,789	24.83	17	0.01	160,268	63.97
Lara	496,527	68.05	214,692	29.42	18,432	2.53	281,835	38.63	71	0.01	729,651	64.98
Mérida	303,767	76.90	84,482	21.39	6,778	1.72	219,285	55.51	36	0.01	395,027	62.91
Miranda	650,242	65.58	310,809	31.35	30,483	3.07	339,433	34.23	126	0.01	991,534	57.34
Monagas	201,689	60.36	125,364	37.52	7,095	2.12	76,325	22.84	50	0.01	334,148	60.86
Nueva Esparta	152,448	66.39	71,115	30.97	6,058	2.64	81,333	35.42	16	0.01	229,621	61.72
Portuguesa	281,482	64.05	147,673	33.60	10,293	2.34	133,809	30.45	57	0.01	439,448	68.27
Sucre	220,214	50.03	209,600	47.61	10,390	2.36	10,614	2.41	33	0.01	440,204	64.00
Táchira	398,690	81.89	79,224	16.27	8,937	1.84	319,466	65.62	45	0.01	486,851	57.54
Trujillo	222,227	63.93	119,730	34.44	5,645	1.62	102,497	29.49	32	0.01	347,602	63.43
Yaracuy	180,683	60.64	109,678	36.81	7,612	2.55	71,005	23.83	19	0.01	297,973	66.40
Zulia	766,915	69.39	321,797	29.12	16,446	1.49	445,118	40.28	121	0.01	1,105,158	51.48
Total	7,303,480	67.08	3,316,142	30.46	267,640	2.46	3,987,338	36.62	1,213	0.01	10,887,262	60.07
Source: version 2 (full csv source); ^{†}the column of participation percentages is from version 1; see also: tally sheet scans

== Reactions ==
On 30 July, the Carter Center issued a harsh rebuke of the election authorities, stating there was a "complete lack of transparency" and that the election "cannot be considered democratic".

=== Fraud allegations ===
Anne Applebaum wrote in The Atlantic that it "was absolutely clear by [31 July] that ... the election had been stolen". Independent observers have described the election results as arbitrary, even by Venezuelan standards, according to The Guardian.

Political scientist Steven Levitsky called the vote "one of the most egregious electoral frauds in modern Latin American history."

Political scientist Dalson Figueiredo of the Federal University of Pernambuco, one of the authors of the AltaVista parallel vote tabulation project, stated: "After analyzing our own data, seeing the opposition's results and how they both match up, my conclusion is that we're witnessing the largest electoral fraud in the history of Latin America."

On his blog, mathematician Terence Tao pointed out that the election results had "oddly round percentages", suggesting that the election was fixed.

=== Domestic ===
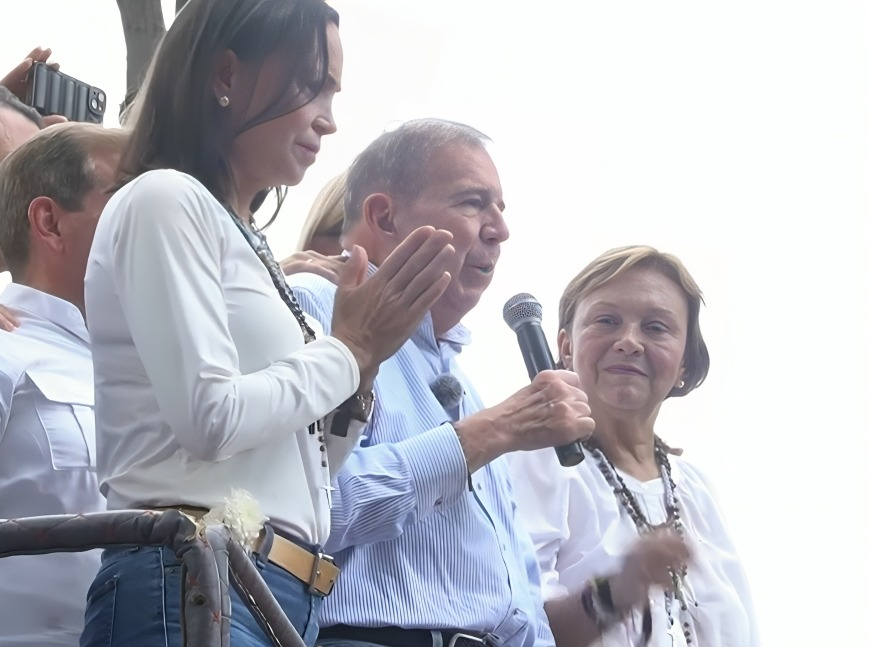
Machado (left) and González (middle) along with his wife (right), addressing the nation in front of the United Nations Development Programme office in Caracas, 2024

Nicolás Maduro called González Urrutia a "coward" during a speech on 30 July 2024: "Come for me, I am waiting for you at Miraflores, Mr. González Urrutia, don't take long to arrive, coward!".

Supporting the PUD/González win announcement, María Corina Machado and Edmundo González rejected the results from the CNE and claimed victory. On 31 July, Maduro alleged that the US was fomenting civil war in Venezuela. González, at an event accompanied by Machado, said "The Venezuelans and the entire world know what happened ... Our struggle continues and we will not rest until the will of the Venezuelan people is respected".

The Communist Party of Venezuela objected to the CNE announcement and called for the complete election results to be published.

Supporting the CNE's announcement of his victory, Maduro described the result as "a triumph of peace and stability". Candidates Benjamín Rausseo, Daniel Ceballos, Luis Eduardo Martínez and José Brito recognized the official results; the latter three were nominated by intervened parties. Although still maintaining that he won, Maduro acknowledged the unrest in Venezuela. He blamed the turmoil on "international Zionism", referencing an antisemitic trope that Jews control the world.

A Meganálisis poll of 1,007 people in Venezuela from 8 to 11 August found that 93% of respondents believe Maduro lost the election, with the majority of Venezuelans expressing anger, anxiety, indignation, and feelings of helplessness after the election. Venezuelans who responded that they were happy were 2.8%, and the poll found that 40% hoped to leave the country before the end of 2024.

=== International ===
The election results released by the government-controlled National Electoral Council (CNE) were followed by a mixture of scepticism and criticism from the leaders of most Latin American countries. Some Latin American countries—including Cuba, Honduras, and Nicaragua—recognized and congratulated Maduro as the election winner. Some world leaders expressed skepticism of the claimed results and did not recognize the CNE claims; others including Russia, China, Iran and North Korea recognized Nicolás Maduro as the winner.

Map showing the countries (in blue) that have declared Edmundo González the winner of the presidential election. Venezuela in black.

President Gabriel Boric of Chile was the first foreign leader to question the CNE result, stating that the "results are difficult to believe". President Daniel Noboa of Ecuador warned that "that is the danger of dictatorship, and today we are witnessing how one more of them tries to take hope away from millions of Venezuelans." Condemnation from Costa Rica, El Salvador, Peru and Uruguay described the CNE result in terms of fraud or corruption. Harsh criticism came from President Javier Milei of Argentina, who called Maduro a dictator.

The three leftist presidents of Brazil, Colombia and Mexico were quick in demanding that all votes be counted, along with full transparency of all ballot records from each precinct. The Colombian government called for the "total vote count, its verification and independent audit to be carried out as soon as possible". President Luiz Inácio Lula da Silva of Brazil called the controversy a "normal" process, but asked for the release of the total vote tally. President Andrés Manuel López Obrador of Mexico said on 30 July that the vote tallies should be publicized, but he saw no evidence of fraud. On 1 August, the three presidents released a joint statement of concern over post-election violence, and asking for "impartial verification of results" quickly, at the disaggregated level. Officials from the three nations—whose governments are allied with Maduro according to the Associated Press (AP)—worked to seek "a solution to the country's political crisis". The AP wrote that the opposition has reason to be wary of recommendations from this group to "follow Venezuelan laws and appear before the appropriate institutions", since the "ruling party controls every aspect of government, including the justice system, and uses it to defeat and repress real and perceived opponents".

United States Secretary of State Antony Blinken initially expressed doubts about the veracity of the results from the CNE, and on 1 August, said there was "overwhelming evidence" that González won. He called for talks and a peaceful transition, but did not refer to González as president-elect. (Note: The Washington Post, The Wall Street Journal, and Reuters say that Blinken did not recognize González as president-elect; The Guardian says that he did.)

On 29 July, Canada's deputy prime minister Chrystia Freeland expressed that Canada had "serious concerns" about the proclaimed election results. Freeland emphasized Canada's long-standing support for Venezuela's democratic opposition and condemned the increasingly authoritarian nature of the regime. In January 2025, Canada formally recognized González as president-elect. The minister of Foreign Affairs Mélanie Joly declared: "Maduro's shameless actions demonstrate that democracy and the rule of law cannot be taken for granted. We will not tolerate the erosion of the democratic process or the repression of citizens seeking to express their rights."

The day after the election, nine Latin American countries (Argentina, Costa Rica, the Dominican Republic, Ecuador, Guatemala, Panama, Paraguay, Peru, and Uruguay) called for an emergency meeting of the Organization of American States (OAS), for 31 July. The member states did not reach consensus on a resolution. OAS Secretary General Luis Almagro—referencing the ongoing investigation in the International Criminal Court (ICC) of Venezuela for crimes against humanity—said he would petition the ICC for the arrest of Maduro. Prior to the election, Maduro had stated that if he did not win, there would be a "bloodbath, a civil war"; Almagro said Maduro was fulfilling that promise and it was time for justice.

The BBC and The Guardian reported that Peru was the first country to recognize González as Venezuela's president-elect, on 30 July—a statement from the former Peruvian foreign minister that was clarified on 5 September by Peru's Council of Ministers after a new foreign minister was named. Peru had recalled its ambassador from Venezuela on 29 July, and expelled the Venezuelan diplomats from Peru the next day. In response, Venezuela severed diplomatic relations with Peru. Peruvian President Dina Boluarte reinforced on 6 September that Peru's position with respect to Venezuela had not changed under the new foreign minister, saying "We will not be part of an electoral fraud; we will not support a dictatorial government."

Panama suspended diplomatic relations with Venezuela. Venezuela also expelled diplomats from Argentina, Chile, Costa Rica, the Dominican Republic, Panama and Uruguay; as of 1 August, Brazil took over running the Caracas embassies of Argentina and Peru.

In November 2024, the prime minister of Italy Giorgia Meloni recognized Edmundo González as the president-elect of Venezuela. The Paraguayan government recognised González as president-elect in early January 2025.

== Aftermath ==
Following the announcements of election results, a national and international political crisis developed.

As of 2 September 2024, NGO Foro Penal reported that Venezuela had 1,793 political prisoners—the highest it had had in the 21st century—among which 1,659, including children, were detained after the election; most had been charged with terrorism and had not been sentenced.

=== Protests ===
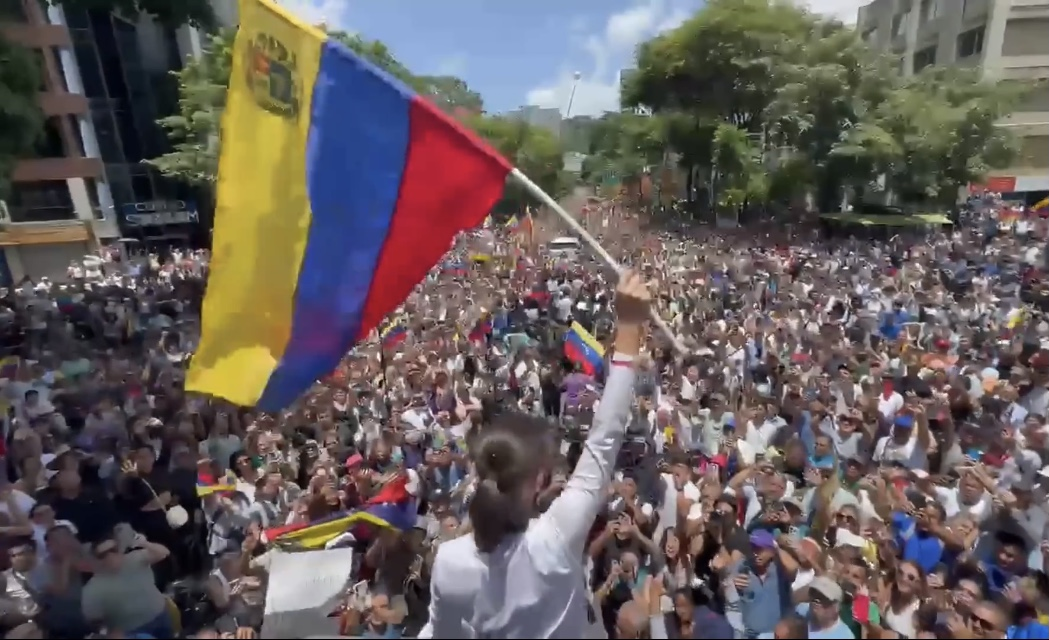
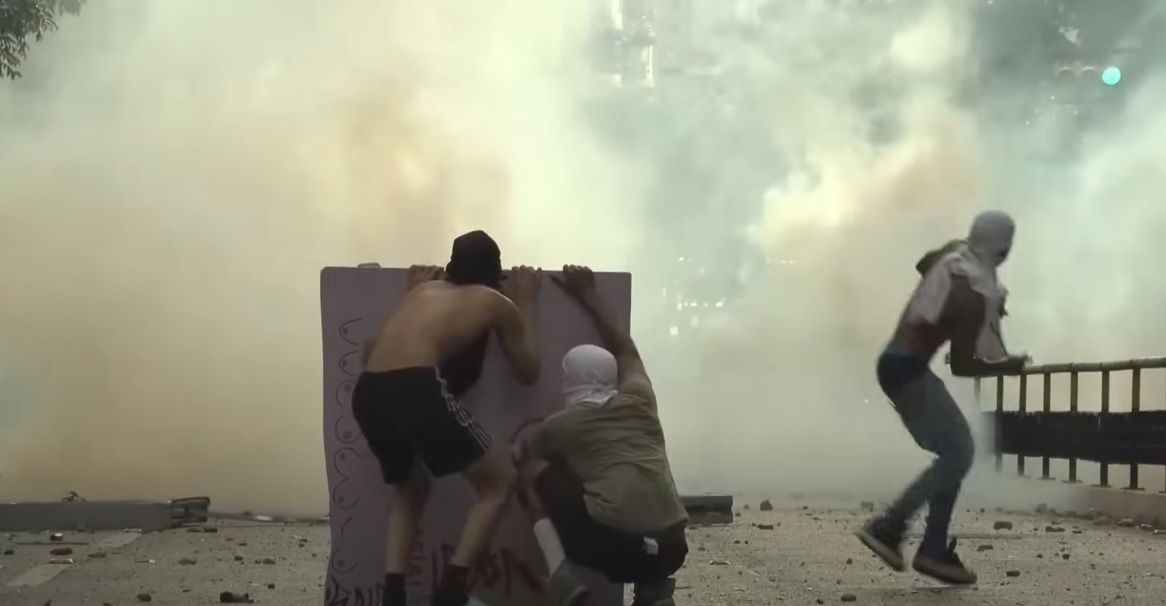
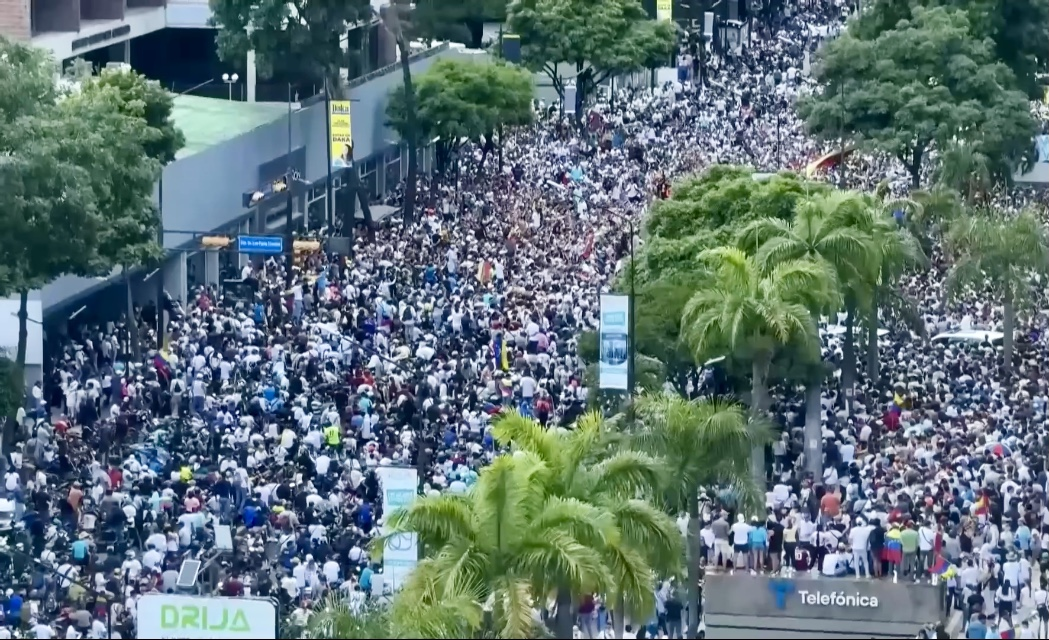
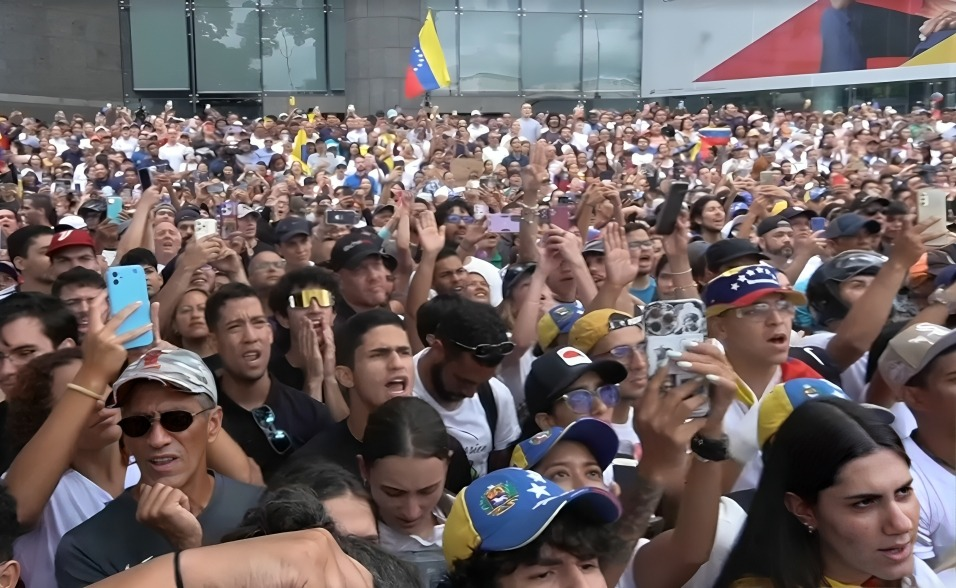
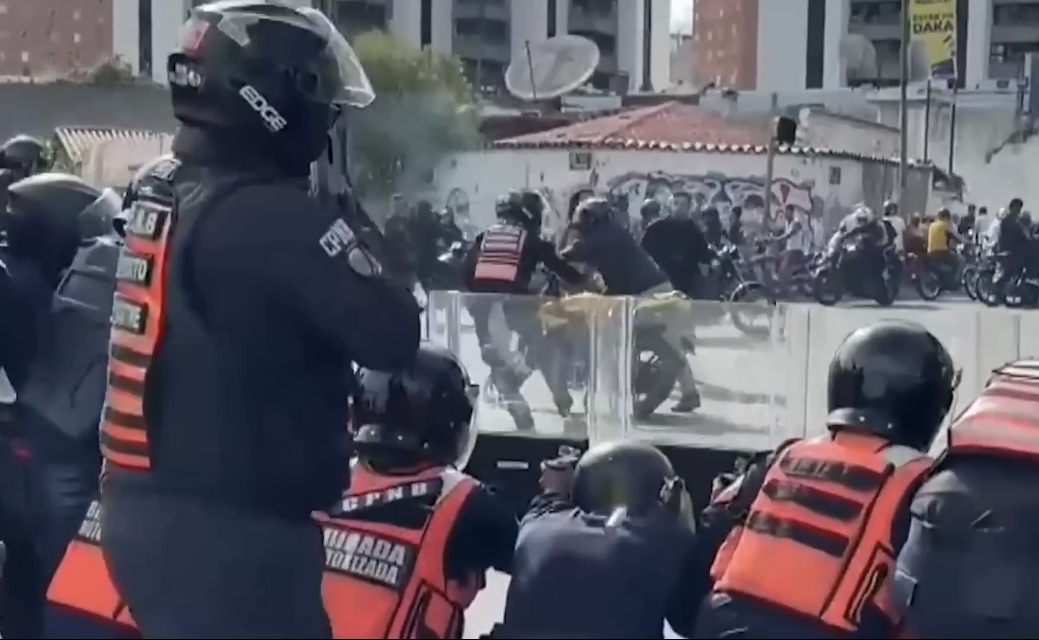
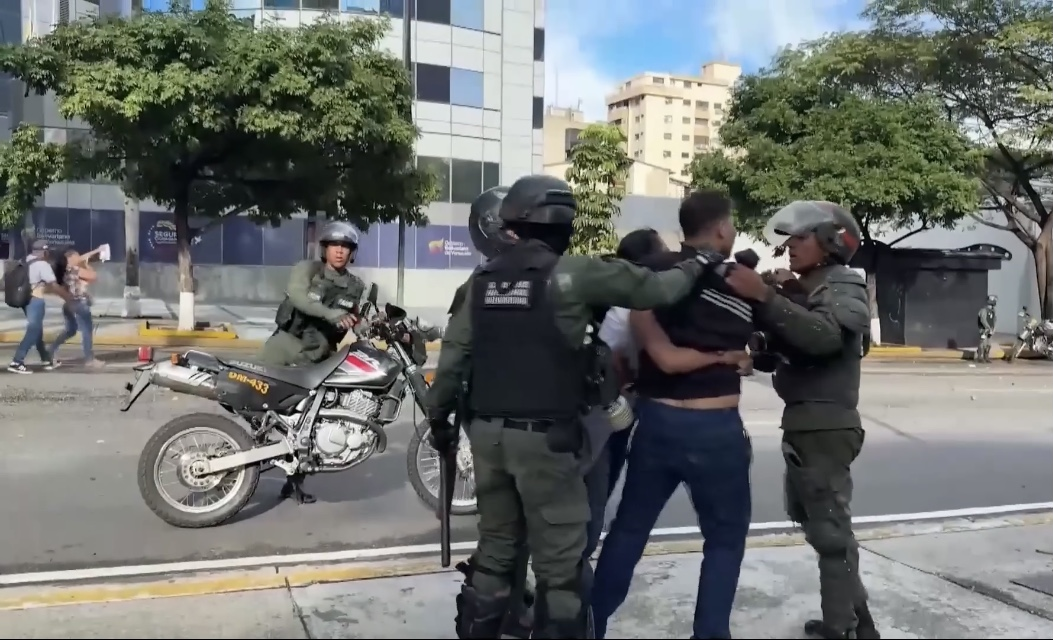
Protests and crackdown followed the announcement of CNE results

Venezuelan citizens who considered the results to be fraudulent took to the streets in ongoing protests. As of 15 August, 25 people had been killed during protests nationwide. Amnesty International and other human rights organizations "condemned the repressive actions of the Nicolás Maduro regime in Venezuela and demanded that it guarantee the right to protest and full respect for the rights to life, personal integrity and freedom".

=== Crackdown ===
Maduro accuses the opposition of promoting a coup. In a crackdown by security forces following the elections, he mentioned using Operation Tun Tun; BBC News stated that "rights groups say it consists of the authorities going door-to-door to detain those with links to the protests or the opposition". Maduro ordered two prisons to be rehabilitated to contain the large number of detainees.

After Diosdado Cabello and Jorge Rodríguez suggested that Machado and González go to prison, Maduro asked authorities to apply "maximum justice" and accused them of being leaders of violent groups. On 1 August, Machado published a letter in The Wall Street Journal, stating that she had gone in to hiding "fearing for my life, my freedom". In a 19 August interview, Tarek Saab, suggested that opposition leaders could be charged as intellectual authors of the deaths that occurred in post-electoral violence.

Freddy Superlano, a former candidate, was detained by masked men two days after the election, and held on unknown charges at El Helicoide along with detained journalist Roland Carreño. After the election, supporters and representatives of the opposition, as well as journalists, have been detained. Opposition leaders said that citizens who witnessed the vote tally sheets in the electoral process (poll watchers) were persecuted and detained.

The press and social media have been subject to censorship. The legislature passed a new law "to more tightly regulate non-governmental organizations, amid criticism of a government crackdown".

=== Transparency in vote reporting and Supreme Court ruling ===
Opposition leaders, world leaders and observers urged Maduro to make the vote tallies at the polling station level public, which had not happened as of 21 August. Refusing to cede power, Maduro instead asked the Supreme Tribunal of Justice on 1 August to audit and approve the results.

The BBC stated that the TSJ review is "likely to be conducted behind closed doors" where only members will see the tallies. The Carter Center, anticipating this move, stated that "the TSJ is another government institution, appointed by the government ... not an independent assessment". Efecto Cocuyo questioned the independence of the TSJ observers.

As anticipated, after reviewing materials submitted, the Supreme Justice Tribunal (TSJ), composed of justices loyal to Maduro, validated the CNE's statements of a win by Maduro; the opposition and other observers have characterized their ruling as invalid, stating that the high court has no constitutional authority over elections. The court stated that the opposition vote tallies were falsified; the Associated Press wrote that the Maduro administration "has claimed—without evidence—that a foreign cyberattack staged by hackers from North Macedonia delayed the vote counting on election night and publication of the disaggregated results."

NTN24 reported that on 26 August, the CNE webpage was briefly accessible. During the period of access, some people were able to view the names of witnesses of the actas and check if they matched what the opposition had reported on resultadosporvenezuela.com. According to NTN24, the names were found to match.

=== González arrest warrant and exile ===
Caryslia Rodríguez, president of the high court, said that a criminal investigation would be conducted regarding "presumably false" results that were published; González was summoned to appear on accusations, among others, of usurping the CNE's functions by uploading election records to www.resultadosconvzla.com; he did not appear for the 26 August summons, or the second summons on 27 August.

After he failed to respond to a third summons, an arrest warrant was issued on 2 September for González for crimes including criminal association and conspiracy after prosecutor Luis Ernesto Dueñez Reyes "requested Gonzalez be arrested for usurpation of functions, falsification of public documents, instigation to disobey the law, conspiracy and association", according to Reuters. González sought refuge for several days in the Spanish embassy in Caracas, and was granted asylum, leaving on a Spanish Armed Forces flight for Madrid on 7 September 2024.

=== Transition proposals ===
Negotiated peaceful transition of power proposals include an exit deal and power-sharing; repeating the election was also proposed. But Machado said the opposition was willing to negotiate for Maduro to recognize González's win, said the electoral victory was non-negotiable and the opposition would not agree to power-sharing. Both the opposition and the Maduro government rejected the idea of repeat elections—both stating they had already won. Amnesty proposals have been advanced and denied.

== See also ==
- 2026 United States strikes in Venezuela
- 2025 Guinea-Bissau general election, an election that would later result in the president getting removed in a coup
- 2024 Syrian parliamentary election, an election in Syria that would later result in the overthrow of the long time ruling Ba'ath Party in December 2024
- 2021 Iranian presidential election
- 2020 Belarusian presidential election
- 2020 Malian parliamentary election, same explanation for Guinea Bissau
- 2020 Myanmar general election, same explanation for Mali and Guinea Bissau
- 2019 Bolivian general election, an election that would trigger mass protests and result in the removal of long time President Evo Morales
- 2009 Iranian presidential election
- 2002 Iraqi presidential referendum, an election that would later culminate the Over throw and the capture of long time Iraqi president Saddam Hussein in a U.S. invasion in 2003
- 1989 Panamanian general election, an election that was constantly annulled by military leader Manuel Noriega which would later trigger a U.S. invasion of Panama in late 1989 and resulted in the capture of the Panamanian military leader
- 1988 Mexican general election
- 1986 Philippine presidential election, an election widely seen as rigged would trigger a mass uprising called the People Power Revolution in late February 1986 and would result in long time Philippine president Ferdinand Marcos resigning and leaving in exile
