= Inauguration of Nicolás Maduro =

Inauguration of Nicolás Maduro may refer to:

- First inauguration of Nicolás Maduro, 2013
- Second inauguration of Nicolás Maduro, 2019
- Third inauguration of Nicolás Maduro, 2025
