= Comando Con Venezuela =

Informal Venezuelan political entity

Comando Con Venezuela Con Vzla
- Official logo
- Abbreviation: Con Vzla
- Leader: María Corina Machado
- President: Magalli Meda
- General coordinator: Henry Alviarez
- Political coordinator: Dignora Hernández
- Founded: 6 February 2023
- Youth wing: Jóvenes Con Venezuela
- Ideology: Anti-Chavismo; Liberalism
- Political position: Big tent; Majority: Centre-right to right-wing; Factions: Centre to centre-left
- Regional affiliation: Democratic Unitary Platform
- International affiliation: Mundo Con Vzla
- Slogan: Hasta el final

Website
- Official website

Comando Con Venezuela (lit. 'Command With Venezuela'), commonly known as Con Vzla, is an informal Venezuelan political organisation established to support the candidacy of María Corina Machado in the primaries organized by the Unitary Platform (the main opposition coalition against the Nicolás Maduro regime) in October 2023, and, following her victory, her candidacy in the 2024 Venezuelan presidential election. Due to Machado's disqualification imposed by the General Contralory and upheld by the Supreme Court of Justice earlier that year, the Comando initially backed the nomination of Corina Yoris, and subsequently Edmundo González's nomination. The Comando coordinated the electoral campaign both in Venezuela and abroad, as well as the citizen-led electoral observation effort and parallel vote count conducted during the elections, claiming to have collected up to 83.5% of the election minutes issued on election day and publishing the results on an webpage. Currently, the organization leads efforts to defend González's legitimacy as president-elect of Venezuela based on the election minutes results.

The complex legal challenges faced by the Venezuelan opposition in preparing for the elections (including judicial interventions of political parties, the disqualification of candidates, and internal disputes within the opposition) have fueled debate over the strict characterization of the Comando as a political force. Additional complications included the fact that neither Machado nor her party, Vente Venezuela, were formally part of the Unitary Platform, the opposition's need to use the electoral card of the defunct Democratic Unity Roundtable (authorized by the National Electoral Council (Consejo Nacional Electoral, CNE) and those of parties like Un Nuevo Tiempo and Movimiento por Venezuela to participate in the elections, and the late proclamation of González (the official president of the MUD party recognized by the CNE but previously lacking a high political profile) as a substitute candidate. While Comando Con Venezuela is not a formal party or alliance and officially operates as the "Unitary Platform campaign command", it often acts independently of the coalition and plays a decisive role in decision-making. This has led analysts and journalists to describe it as the main coordination of opposition forces in Venezuela, which could be characterized as a coalition, party, or de facto political movement.

For the primaries, the Comando was composed of Vente Venezuela, Alianza Bravo Pueblo, National Convergence, Emergent People, Organización Fuerza en Movimiento, Alianza Social Independiente de Sucre, Carabobo Militancia Nacional, and Generación Independiente, with Popular Will joining shortly before the primaries. Internal reorganization ahead of the elections saw the inclusion of members from other Unitary Platform parties, although much of its partisan structure relied on Vente Venezuela. The proclamation of González as the presidential nominee led to the addition of figures close to him to the main ranks. However, some parties within the Unitary Platform, such as Un Nuevo Tiempo, have explicitly denied belonging to the Comando.

A significant portion of its militant structure is based on grassroots mobilization without formal party affiliation, with these individuals referred to as comanditos (lit. 'Little Commands'). They are responsible for organizing campaign events. Another key mobilization element is the Red 600K, which collected electoral election minutes from Venezuelan polling stations through witnesses and mobilized citizens to protect them.

From its establishment to date, particularly during the lead-up to and aftermath of the 2024 presidential election, the Comando's leadership and members have faced intense repression, persecution, and exile. Key figures from Machado's campaign team for the primaries have sought refuge in the Argentine Embassy in Caracas since early 2024, while an undetermined number of state-level party or technical authorities, as well as election witnesses involved in defending the election minutes on election day, remain detained without charges, with their families denouncing these arrests as kidnappings. At least one election witness has been reported dead while in state custody. The repression against Comando Con Venezuela authorities has drawn widespread condemnation from international human rights organizations and foreign governments.

== See also ==
- National Citizens' Movement for Free Elections
