= Opinion polls in Venezuela =

Public research surveys in Venezuela

Opinion polls in Venezuela are of varying quality and have been used to manipulate public opinion.

== The most reliable polling firms in Venezuela ==
The C-INFORMA News Coalition (Medianálisis, Efecto Cocuyo, Cazadores de Fake News and Probox, with the support of the Latin American Center for Investigative Journalism (CLIP)) analyzed 14 polling firms, making it the most serious study in Venezuela for ranking the country's polling firms. ORC Consultores -Frequency58-, and Consultores 21.

== Datanalisis ==
According to The Wall Street Journal, Datanalisis is "a respected pollster" in Venezuela.

== Hinterlaces ==
Efecto Cocuyo analysed an April 2024 poll by Hinterlaces and concluded that its methodology was inconsistent, citing contradictory dates, a small sample size, high number of undecided voters, and very high margin of error. The poll results were published on website Fuser News, alleged by Efecto Cucuyo to be disseminators of Russian, Iranian, Chinese and Venezuelan state propaganda, and also by Telesur, a state-controlled Venezuelan media company.

== 2024 presidential election ==
=== Alleged manipulation of polls ===
During the run-up to the 2024 Venezuelan presidential election, several news outlets reported on the proliferation of polls favoring incumbent Nicolás Maduro published since May 2024 by previously unknown polling firms, fuelling concerns that some polls were being used as propaganda tools by Chavismo. These poll results differed significantly from those published by more traditional pollsters, which showed Maduro trailing.

According to Medianálisis, Efecto Cocuyo, Cazadores de Fake News and Probox, working with the Latin American Center for Investigative Journalism, these polls were being used to discredit opposition candidates in what some outlets called a "poll war". Polls showing Maduro ahead were predominantly disseminated by media outlets claimed to be pro-Maduro, such as Globovisión, El Universal, Venezuela News, Correo del Orinoco and NotiTarde.

Six pollsters consistently placed opposition candidate Edmundo González in first place, while others placed Maduro in front. Well-known pollsters in the Venezuelan political sphere, such as ORC Consultores -Frequency58-, Datanalisis, Datincorp, Delphos, and Consultores 21, along with the emerging Poder y Estrategia, indicated that Urrutia had more than 50% of voting intentions. Results by lesser-known firms Hinterlaces, ICS Latam, IMC Orientación, and DataViva, among others, showed Maduro with between 54% and 70% of votes. Results by CECA Consultores showed a technical tie slightly favoring the opposition.

=== Investigation of pollsters ===
On 28 May, Colombian newspaper El Tiempo named IdeaDatos and Data Viva as examples of suspicious pollsters. NTN24 also singled out Insight in June 2024, writing that "Eight of ten [recent] polls give the winner to the opposition candidate, Edmundo González Urrutia, and the only two that give victory to ... Maduro, are unknown firms and their social media accounts are recent", adding that IdeaDatos and PoliAnalítica "actively campaign for Nicolás Maduro".

La Patilla reported a statement by sociologist Juan Manuel Trak saying that polls in Venezuela are systematically used as propaganda tools to influence public opinion on possible election results, providing examples of manipulated polls for propaganda purposes from both the government and the opposition. Informative Coalition (C-INFORMA) concluded that six out of fourteen evaluated firms, then-recently created and of dubious credibility, had published 37 public opinion studies used in a strategy to manipulate the electoral climate. They found seven pollsters to be part of a possible information manipulation campaign, six pollsters to be biased in favor of Maduro, and one pollster to be in favor of the opposition.

Political scientist Jesús Castellanos, an expert in electoral affairs, recognized the existence of a "poll war" involving pro-Maduro firms showing bias and disseminating fake news. Eugenio Martínez, a journalist and director of the monitoring NGO Votoscopio, argued that there was no poll war per se but rather a misinformation strategy facilitated by the absence of independent media. Martínez highlighted that the majority of polls favored the opposition, but the size of the gap between the candidates depends on voter turnout. In Venezuela, where voting is not mandatory, higher turnout would increase González Urrutia's advantage, while lower turnout would reduce the difference.

Venezuelan independent journalism website Efecto Cocuyo published several detailed exposés of pollsters, alleging faulty methodology, systematic bias in favor of Maduro, and repeated dissemination of their polls by pro-Maduro outlets. Polling firms alleged to be unreliable include IdeaDatos, CMIDE, Parametrica, Hinterlaces, IMC Orientación, and ICS Latam.

==== IdeaDatos, CMIDE and Paramétrica ====
According to Efecto Cocuyo, election pollster IdeaDatos published its first poll on 6 May 2024 – a 29 April to 3 May 2024 poll – and their data was re-published by multiple news outlets alleged to be "in favor of the [Maduro regime]". Efecto Cocuyo stated that IdeaDatos then had no history of publishing its own polls on its Twitter account since its October 2020 creation and until May 2024, and there was "no further evidence of its existence as a company".

Methodological concerns include erroneous conclusions, statistical and sampling data missing or wrong, and reliability data and margin of error inconsistencies. (Note: "The technical sheet does not provide details of age groups, geographic or socioeconomic level, which would allow us to know if it is representative of the Venezuelan electoral universe, how the percentage of the sample by cities or states, nor what would be the specific percentage of men and women in each case. Nor does it specify whether the consultations were from one person per household, on public roads, by telephone, internet or mixed.") Efecto Cocuyo found similar problems in the publication of IdeaDatos` second and third polls in May and June, and stated that the firm's website did not list a RIF [tax information], telephone number, email or physical address, the names of directors or employees, or polls from before May 2024. Similar issues were found with Data Viva ("recently created, with methodological flaws, omissions about its business identity and a history of low-quality studies") and with CMIDE and Paramétrica. With a similar profile, the new pollster, Global Census, first appeared on social media in March 2024, and announced its first-time poll in favor of Maduro in June 2024.

==== IMC Orientación ====
Efecto Cocuyo reported that on 1 July 2024 IMC Orientación published a poll placing Maduro in the lead, despite the firm's website having been created only days before its first poll and it listing no employees, management, address, phone number, contact email, or social media profiles. Efecto Cucuyo claimed the poll displayed methodological and statistical oddities, such as interviewing 66% women, and 100% of respondents identifying with a political party. The firm uses the same web frameworks as Paramétrica and has a similar web design, in addition to claiming to have numerous studies and publications, without providing evidence. The poll was disseminated by several media outlets considered to be pro-Maduro. These findings led to Efecto Cocuyo classifying the firm as inconsistent.

==== ICS Latam ====
According to Efecto Cucuyo, ICS Latam is a polling firm founded in 2012 that had been inactive since November 2023, abruptly returning in July 2024 to publish a survey showing Maduro leading. The lack of updates on their social media, the suspension of their website, and the dissemination of the survey by these media have raised doubts about the accuracy and quality of their data. The survey also presents oddities such as the absence of "None" or "Don't know / Don't respond" categories, and a duration exceeding the recommended period to avoid mixing formed and forming opinions. The poll allegedly lacked a technical sheet, violating Article 82 of the Venezuelan Organic Law of Electoral Processes (LOPE), which mandates its inclusion to ensure transparency, and was disseminated by media outlets such as Globovisión, El Universal, Venezuela News, Correo del Orinoco and Notitarde, known for being part of a network of proxy media for sociopolitical misinformation in Venezuela.

== Credibility of polling firms ==
Polling Firm	Date of First Publication	Publications	Credibility Score (0 lower–10 higher)	Comments
Data Política	23 March 2024	4	1.88	No technical sheet, graphic and methodological errors, no website.
CMIDE 50.1	14 May 2024	2	2.13	Deleted previous content, only profile on X, not transparent.
Insight by Contrapunto	7 August 2023	1	3.69	Uses paid survey platform, no contact details.
DataViva	17 August 2023	9	4.18	Lack of transparency, incomplete website and data.
Hinterlaces	6 August 2004		4.69	No technical sheet, no sampling data
IdeaDatos	6 May 2024	4	4.92	Calculation errors in error and credibility, no business history.
Mass Behavior Research	3 September 2023	16	5.15	Publishes contradictory surveys, lacks methodological data.
Paramétrica	24 May 2024	1	5.24	Website created days before publication, questionable data.
Delphos	25 May 2015		7.9	
Hercon	27 August 2011		7.92	
Datincorp	2 January 2013		8.66	
Meganalisis	20 December 2010		8.71	
Consultores 21	5 February 2003		9.33	
ORC Consultores -Frequency58-	30 May 2014		9.91	
Source: Medianálisis (July 2024). Credibility scores calculated by C-Informa. Higher credibility scores indicate higher credibility.
