= Third inauguration of Nicolás Maduro =

2025 Venezuelan presidential inauguration

Third presidential inauguration of Nicolás Maduro
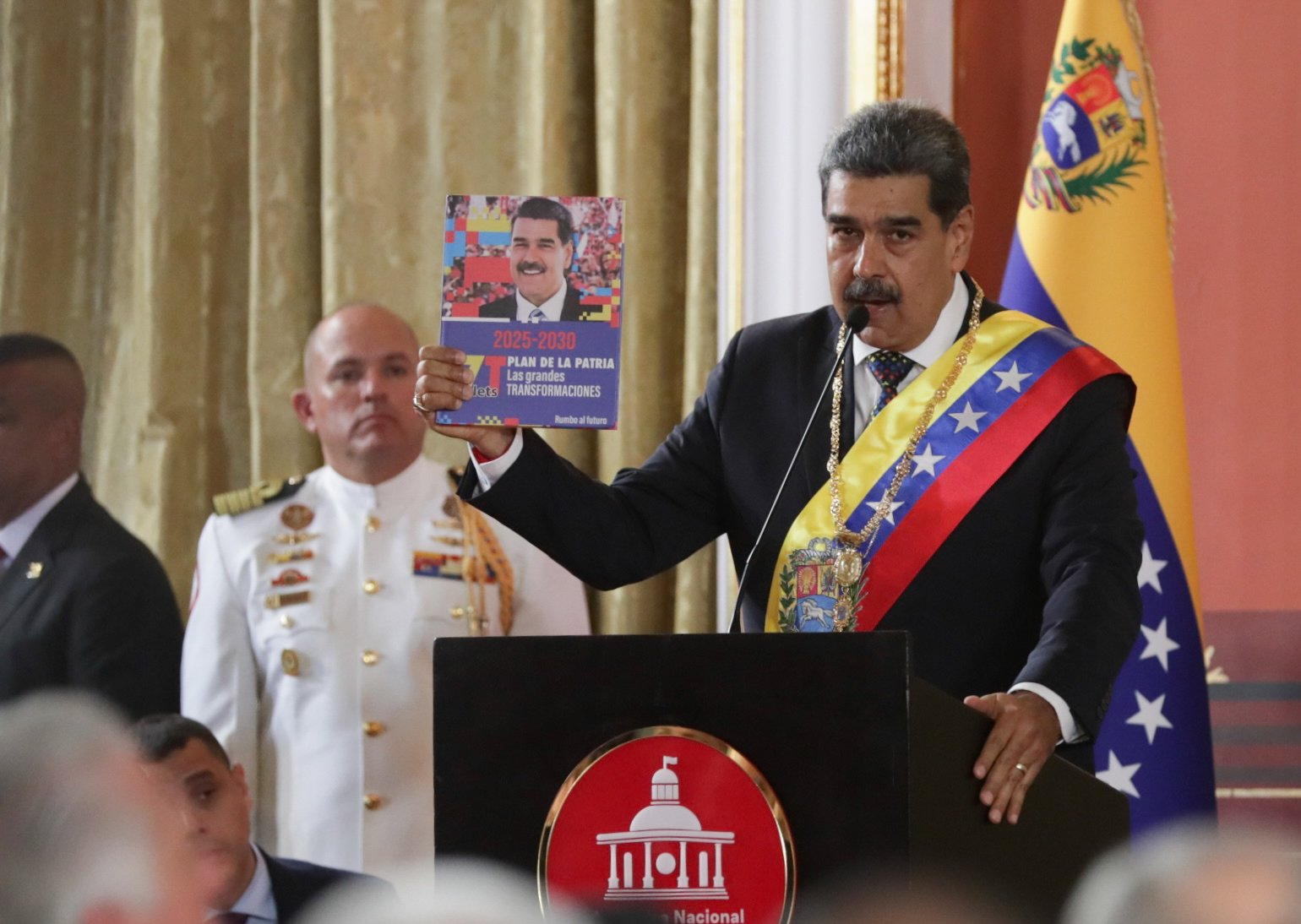
- Date: 10 January 2025; 17 months ago
- Time: 11:00pm VST (UTC-4)
- Venue: Palacio Federal Legislativo
- Location: Caracas, Venezuela
- Also known as: 2025 Presidential inauguration of Nicolás Maduro
- Participants: Nicolás Maduro; 53rd president of Venezuela — Assuming office Caryslia Rodríguez; President of the Supreme Tribunal of Justice — Administering Oath; Delcy Rodríguez; Vice President of Venezuela — Assuming office

The third presidential inauguration of Nicolás Maduro as president of Venezuela took place on 10 January 2025. He was sworn-in as the president for a period of six years, but did not serve the full term, as he was illegally abducted by the United States on January 3, 2026. The event took place amid domestic and international criticism of the 2024 election process, of which Maduro was declared the winner by the government-administered National Electoral Council and top court, which have not released detailed tallies confirming his victory. Only two chiefs of state, from Cuba and Nicaragua, attended the ceremony.

== Election ==
The elections for the Venezuelan presidential term 2025–2031 were held on July 28, 2024, following the signing of the Barbados Agreement, which sought to provide certain guarantees for a democratic electoral process. International monitors called the election neither free nor fair, and reported that the incumbent Maduro administration repressed the political opposition before, during, and after the election.

Widely viewed by the West as having won the election, the opposition candidate Edmundo González fled to claim asylum in Spain amid repression of dissent and a national and international political crisis that resulted when Venezuelan electoral authorities announced that Nicolás Maduro had won.

== Inauguration ==
The venue for the president's swearing-in was the Federal Legislative Palace in Caracas. Although the ceremony was scheduled for 12 pm, Maduro arrived at 10:30 to begin the swearing-in 90 minutes early. Authorities implemented closures of Venezuela's land border and airspace with Colombia prior to the inauguration, citing security considerations.

Among the guests was the far-right member of the European Parliament Diana Șoșoacă, from Romania.

== Reactions ==
The day of the inauguration, the United States, European Union (E.U.), United Kingdom and Canada placed new sanctions on Venezuelan individuals. The U.S. also increased the reward for Maduro's arrest to $25 million. U.S. Secretary of State Antony Blinken stated that the U.S. "does not recognize Nicolas Maduro as the president of Venezuela" and a U.S. Treasury Under Secretary, Bradley Smith, added that the U.S. stood with its "likeminded partners" in "solidarity with the people's vote for new leadership and rejects Maduro's fraudulent claim of victory". National Security Council spokesperson John Kirby said that the decision to raise the reward as part of "a concerted message of solidarity with the Venezuelan people," meant "to further elevate international efforts to maintain pressure on Maduro and his representatives." Maduro replied that the "outgoing government of the United States doesn't know how to take revenge on us".

The E.U., in coordination with the U.K., applied new sanctions to 15 new individuals, including the Supreme Tribunal of Justice head and security and military officials held responsible by the E.U. and the U.K. for undermining democracy.

Canada applied new sanctions to 14 additional senior Venezuelan officials, stating that they had "engaged in activities that have directly or indirectly supported human rights violations in Venezuela".

== See also ==
- 2024 Venezuelan political crisis
- 2024 Venezuelan protests
- International reactions to the 2024 Venezuelan presidential election
- Second inauguration of Nicolás Maduro
- Venezuelan presidential crisis
- Capture of Nicolás Maduro
