= Delphos =

Delphos may refer to:

- Delphos (mythology), the son of Apollo in Greek mythology; Delphi was named for him
- Isle of Delphos, a former name for the island of Delos, mythological birthplace of Apollo
- Delphos (polling firm), a Venezuelan polling firm
- Delphos, a character in the Imperial Guard in Marvel Comics

== Places in the United States ==
- Delphos, Iowa
- Delphos, Kansas
- Delphos, New Mexico, a census-designated place in New Mexico
- Delphos, Ohio
