= Law against Fascism, Neofascism and Similar Expressions =

Venezuelan Assembly bill

The Law against Fascism, Neofascism and Similar Expressions (Spanish: Ley contra el Fascismo, Neofascismo y Expresiones Similares), also known as the Law against fascism or the Anti-fascism law, is a 2024 Venezuelan bill intended to "establish the means and mechanisms to preserve peaceful coexistence and public tranquility" and "protect Venezuelan society from the emergence of any expression of a fascist, neo-fascist or similar nature". On 2 April, Delcy Rodríguez presented it to the V National Assembly of Venezuela, controlled by the administration of Nicolás Maduro; it passed its first reading on the same day, in record time. The law, which would need a second hearing, would ban certain organizations, messages on social media, and create penalties including increased sentences for organizations that promote what Maduro's government defines as fascism or neo-fascism, with features of racism, chauvinism, classism, moral conservatism and neoliberalism.

Maduro's government says the law is needed to address what it calls unconstitutional violence encouraged by some sectors of society in the last two decades. Rodríguez referred to the 2014 and 2017 Venezuelan protests, stating that "extremist sectors" (referring to the parties who make up the majority opposition) had caused "economic and social genocide" in the country. Critics and non-governmental organizations say the law would be used to limit opposition to Maduro's government ahead of the July 2024 Venezuelan presidential election; an article in Spain's El País stated that the law "opens a new door for the control at the discretion of the Government of political freedoms and expression in Venezuela, amid a tightening of the persecution against opponents, journalists and critics".

== Reception ==
=== After first reading ===
A director for Human Rights Watch tweeted that the law would "allow opponents to be criminalized and candidates to be disqualified". Amnesty International criticized the proposed law for its vague and ambiguous definition of fascism, its limits on freedoms of expression and peaceful assembly, and criminalization of opposition to Maduro.

Venezuela's National College of Journalists stated that the law "constitutes a serious risk for the essential rights of Venezuelan society, which are guaranteed by the 1999 Constitution and the international pacts signed by the Venezuelan State", specifically, "freedom of expression, thought, association, teaching and dissent".

Senators Marco Rubio (R-FL), Bill Cassidy (R-LA) and Ben Cardin (D-MD) serving on the United States Senate Committee on Foreign Relations issued a statement expressing concern that the upcoming presidential elections would not be "free, fair, nor democratic", nothing the passage of the bill as "further proof that civil society, political opposition, and freedom of the press have no place in Venezuela".

The Simon Wiesenthal Center expressed concern that, if enacted, the law could have antisemitic applications.
