= Barbados Agreement =

Political agreement in Venezuela

The Partial Agreement on the Promotion of Political Rights and Electoral Guarantees for All (in Spanish: Acuerdo parcial sobre la promoción de derechos políticos y garantías electorales para todos), most commonly known simply as the Barbados Agreement, is a pair of agreements signed by the Maduro government and the Venezuelan opposition Plataforma Unitaria Democrática in October 2023, in Bridgetown, Barbados.

== History ==
The agreement is part of broader efforts to ease dialogue between the Venezuelan government and the opposition as well as promoting negotiations aiming at free and fair elections in the country and the welfare of the Venezuelan people. Norway has worked as the main mediator both in the broad talks and in the Partial Agreement.

On 17 October 2023, the Maduro government and the Unitary Platform signed in Bridgetown (Barbados) two provisional agreements on "the promotion of political rights and electoral guarantees for all" and "the protection of the Nation's vital interests". The delegations, represented respectively by Jorge Rodríguez and Gerardo Blyde and accompanied by diplomatic representatives from Norway, Barbados, Russia, the Netherlands, Colombia, Mexico and the United States, agreed on points such as respect for the right of each political actor to select their candidate for the presidential elections, the implementation of electoral guarantees, and the holding of presidential elections in the second half of 2024.

On 18 October 2023, following the signing of the treaty, the United States Department of the Treasury issued four general licenses granting six-month relief until 18 April 2024 from a group of sanctions against the country's hydrocarbon, natural gas and gold industries, as well as removing prohibitions on secondary market trading. The agency warned that the decision would be revoked if the Venezuelan government failed to honor its commitments under the agreement signed the previous day. The Secretary of State, Antony Blinken, later clarified that an electoral timetable, the authorization of all presidential candidates, and the release of political prisoners were expected by the end of November. The license would only be renewed if Venezuela fulfilled its commitments under the electoral roadmap, as well as other commitments regarding unjustly detained persons, according to a statement from the Office of Foreign Assets Control (OFAC) of the Treasury Department.

Another result of the new treaty was the release of five political prisoners: Juan Requesens, Roland Carreño, Marco Antonio Garcés Carapaica, Eurinel Rincón and Mariana Barreto.

On 24 October, after the primaries were held, Jorge Rodríguez Gómez denounced that the opposition had violated the Barbados pact, calling it a gigantic "electoral scam" while refusing to acknowledge the large turnout and long lines at polling stations that day. "What happened on Sunday is not verifiable, that was not even an election," Rodríguez said at a press conference. "It is impossible, that nonsense (the projection that about 2.5 million Venezuelans voted in the primaries), there is no way to sustain that number," even though in the 2012 primaries 3 million opposition supporters participated, and in the recent 2021 regional elections 3.97 million opposition supporters voted. However, in the first agreement signed in Barbados it was established:

First: The Parties recognize and respect the right of each political actor to freely select their candidate for the presidential elections in accordance with their internal mechanisms, in compliance with the Constitution of the Bolivarian Republic of Venezuela and the law.

— Barbados, 17 October 2023

Deputy José Brito (member of Operación Alacrán) described the primaries as a "scam". Brito filed a contentious appeal before the Supreme Tribunal of Justice (TSJ) to verify the procedures of the Commission and the civil organization. "If with 60% they are giving a figure (1.5 million), with 100% what are they going to say, that 30 million voted?" he questioned. María Corina Machado stated that supporters of Chavismo also voted in these elections held on Sunday, adding: "They do not even fool their own people," who "also came out to vote on 22 October".

On 26 October 2023, Gerardo Blyde stated that it is not normal for the government to "judicialize an internal electoral process protected by an agreement. This could pose a serious problem for compliance with the agreement." Blyde reiterated that the primaries are protected under the partial agreement on the promotion of political rights and electoral guarantees. The United States reiterated its position regarding the agreement reached between Nicolás Maduro's government and the opposition, emphasizing that it is based on "verification" of commitments, not on "trust".

On 3 December, the government held a consultative referendum, but independent reports of the electoral process recorded very low participation. However, the CNE announced that the event resulted in 10,554,330 votes and the approval of the five questions asked. On 25 January 2024, Jorge Rodríguez Gómez, as head of the negotiating delegation, demanded that the facilitators of the negotiation process travel to the country to verify compliance with the Barbados Agreement. However, hours later he declared that "there is no way" that María Corina Machado would be eligible for public office. Maduro, for his part, stated that the agreements were "mortally wounded".

On 26 January, the Political-Administrative Chamber issued ruling 00005 (Case File No. 2023-0461) in response to the lawsuit filed on 15 December 2023 by María Corina Machado, jointly with a precautionary protection action (video ). The ruling admitted the lawsuit but declared the precautionary measure inadmissible, confirming the constitutionality of Article 105 of the Organic Law of the Comptroller General, which empowers the Comptroller to impose disqualifications. The TSJ declared inadmissible the precautionary measure and confirmed that, under Resolution No. 01-00-0000285 of 16 September 2021, Machado is disqualified for fifteen (15) years.

On 27 January, Gerardo Blyde, as head of the opposition delegation in the negotiations, rejected Machado's disqualification and declared that the Unitary Platform reaffirmed her as its unitary candidate. The coalition also announced it would denounce the partial violation of the Barbados Agreement to Norwegian facilitators.

On 29 January, the OFAC revoked License 43, which had previously granted relief in October to the state-owned Venezuelan Mining Company (Minerven). It also announced that concessions to the oil and natural gas sectors would not be renewed, citing "the actions of Nicolás Maduro and his representatives in Venezuela, having carried out the arrest of members of the democratic opposition and prohibiting candidates from running in the 2024 presidential elections, which are inconsistent with the agreements signed in Barbados last October".

On 2 March 2024, the President of the National Assembly, Jorge Rodríguez, announced that he had signed the Caracas Agreement with representatives of various national sectors aligned with the government (representing less than 6% of the electorate), excluding the Unitary Platform. He claimed that it was the "development of the Barbados Agreement and replaces it, because the greater encompasses the lesser." Rodríguez submitted the agreement to the CNE, which included general principles, a presumptive calendar, and expanded electoral guarantees for the presidential elections. Political scientist Pablo Quintero argued that the forced end of Barbados would further strain negotiations between the United States and the Venezuelan government, already deteriorated, and noted that the new agreement sidelined the Unitary Platform in favor of local actors not recognized in the Norway-mediated talks. On 28 May, the CNE revoked the invitation to observers from the European Union, composed of 27 member states. "The European Union deeply regrets the unilateral decision of the Venezuelan National Electoral Council to withdraw its invitation to observe the presidential elections of 28 July," said the statement published by the EU in Venezuela. Elvis Amoroso explained that the decision was taken due to sanctions imposed on several Venezuelan entities, companies and officials. However, the EU stated that it only maintains sanctions against more than 50 Venezuelans accused of repression or efforts to undermine democracy, which do not affect the Venezuelan economy. The United States government stated that Nicolás Maduro’s government "and its representatives" must "immediately" reverse the suspension of the invitation to the European Union as part of the observation of the 28 July presidential elections, arguing that it violates the agreements signed in Barbados. Venezuelan Foreign Minister Yván Gil reacted on the social network X to the statement signed by US State Department spokesman Matthew Miller, rejecting the request to reinvite the EU and suggesting that the US is attempting to sabotage the elections, being part of the October pact between government and opposition. Canada also expressed concern after the CNE’s decision to revoke the invitation to the EU Election Observation Mission for the presidential election.

On 5 June 2024, Jorge Rodríguez called on the presidential candidates to sign an agreement to recognize the results of the 28 July presidential elections. Using the pretext that the opposition was preparing a narrative to claim fraud on election day, he challenged especially María Corina Machado and Edmundo González to sign: "On that fraud narrative they want to incite violence. We will not allow it, it ends here," Rodríguez said. Edmundo González responded that he would not sign any agreement with the government because it had already violated the Barbados Agreement: "Sign an agreement for what? The first to have violated the agreements it signed is the Government; the Barbados agreements have been left as dead letter."

=== Partial Agreement on the Promotion of Political Rights and Electoral Guarantees for All ===
The agreement was: On 17 October 2023, the Government of the Bolivarian Republic of Venezuela and the opposition coalition known as the Unitary Platform signed the Partial Agreement on the Promotion of Political Rights and Electoral Guarantees for All in Mexico City, as part of the ongoing negotiation process launched under the 2021 Memorandum of Understanding.

The agreement reaffirmed the commitment of both sides to hold the 2024 presidential election under constitutional guarantees. Among its provisions were:

- the right of each political actor to freely nominate presidential candidates;
- updating and cleaning the Permanent Electoral Registry, including abroad;
- audits of the electoral system with participation of political parties, domestic witnesses and international observers;
- invitations to technical electoral observation missions from bodies such as the European Union, the United Nations, the African Union, the Inter-American Union of Electoral Organizations and the Carter Center;
- guarantees of security, freedom of movement and assembly for all candidates;
- commitments to balanced access to public and private media and social networks;
- recognition of the results proclaimed by the National Electoral Council.

The text also called for a political climate of tolerance and non-violence, compliance with electoral regulations by public officials, transparent financing mechanisms, and equal conditions for all campaigns. Both parties agreed that the same guarantees should extend to subsequent electoral processes within the constitutional schedule.

The accord established a mechanism for monitoring and verification and left open further negotiations on democratic reforms, human rights, and the lifting of international sanctions against Venezuela.

== Aftermath and reactions ==
Five people jailed in Venezuela were released on October 19, 2023, including journalist Roland Carreno of the opposition party Popular Will and former legislator Juan Requesens of the Justice First party, who was under house arrest.

National Assembly of Venezuela president and Maduro government negotiator Jorge Rodríguez called the agreement "the first step towards a civic culture of tolerance and search for agreements and dialogues." Opposition negotiator Gerardo Blyde stated that "this is a first partial agreement. Many points that have already been contemplated in the memorandum of understanding signed in Mexico are yet to be met" adding that the agreements previously made have been progressively fulfilled.

The United States and European Union celebrated the agreement. On 17 October 2023, the U.S. government stated that it welcomes the agreement, as it "represents a necessary step in the continuation of an inclusive dialogue process and the restoration of democracy in Venezuela." The U.S. also eased some of its sanctions on Venezuela oil, gas and gold sectors, warning that it could reverse the relief if the agreement collapses. Human rights NGO Foro Penal, while celebrating the release of the five detainees, condemned the lack of transparency in the negotiations and declared that 270 political prisoners remained detained in Venezuela as of October 2023, when the agreement was signed.

== Broken agreement ==
Despite the agreement, leading opposition candidate María Corina Machado was disqualified from the 2024 Venezuelan presidential election by Venezuela's Supreme Tribunal of Justice in January 2024.

Following poor turnout in the 2023 Venezuelan referendum, the chief prosecutor of Venezuela, Tarek William Saab, accused opposition leaders of sabotaging the referendum and issued arrest warrants for 15 of them, with charges such as treason and conspiracy. Saab—under sanctions for multiple alleged offenses—is charged by human rights organizations as "being one of the key people in the regime's efforts to use the Venezuelan justice system as an instrument of political persecution", according to an August 2024 Miami Herald article.

With the main opposition candidate banned from running, the US stated that Maduro's government had "fallen short" on its commitments, and reinstated some sanctions in April 2024.

Organizations such as the United Nations, the Organization of American States, the European Union, and Human Rights Watch, and countries including Chile, Colombia, Ecuador, Paraguay, Uruguay, Canada, United States, United Kingdom, France and Germany rejected Machado's disqualification. Several foreign political leaders condemned the disqualification, including President Luis Lacalle Pou of Uruguay, President Mario Abdo Benítez of Paraguay, and President Gustavo Petro of Colombia. At the Mercosur summit, President Alberto Fernández of Argentina and President Lula da Silva of Brazil declined to reject the disqualification. Antony Blinken, US Secretary of State, called Machado's disqualification "deeply unfortunate". The European Union High Representative for Foreign Affairs and Security Policy, Josep Borrell, stated that the disqualification "undermines democracy". On 13 July 2023, the European Parliament passed a resolution condemning the disqualification.

== See also ==
- Presidency of Nicolás Maduro
- Sanctions during the Venezuelan crisis
