= Venezuela News =

- Website type: Blog
- Available in: Spanish
- Owner: Pedro Carvajalino
- Website: https://venezuela-news.com/
- Current status: Active

Venezuela News is a Bolivarian propaganda website from Venezuela. Launched in 2021 and introduced initially as an independent news portal, Venezuela News has close links to the ruling United Socialist Party of Venezuela (PSUV). It has created and amplified misinformation and has employed digital manipulation tactics. Its director is Colombian Pedro Carvajalino.

== History ==
Venezuela News launched on November 17, 2021, when the hashtag #NaceVenezuelaNews was promoted on social media in an organized manner, including by state TV channel Venezolana de Televisión (VTV) as well as by journalists who were part of the Free Alex Saab movement. The news portal was presented as a «media outlet independent of public or economic powers» created with the aim to combat misinformation and rumors, and during its launch phase avoided links to the Maduro regime. However, its editorial line quickly moved to a pro-regime approach, using rumors and misinformation in many articles.

From November 2021 until late December 2023, fact-checking organizations from Venezuela published at least 37 instances of misinformation that were amplified by the portal. The organizations, including C-Informa, documented its links with the United Socialist Party of Venezuela (PSUV) and its use of digital doctoring of images as well as the use of paid influencers followed by a host of bots.

Before the 2024 presidential elections in Venezuela, Venezuela News continued to publish misinformation against opposition leader María Corina Machado, including posts that claimed that Machado "threatens the government with a violent transition" and that she supported the 2024 coup attempt in Bolivia, as well as posting montages that falsely depict American flags at her rallies.

== See also ==
- Con el mazo dando
- La hojilla
- Lechuguinos
- Zurda Konducta
