= Anti-Money Laundering Improvement Act =

United States anti-money laundering law

Anti-Money Laundering Act
- Other short titles: AML Whistleblower Improvement Act; Bank Secrecy Act (BSA)
- Long title: An Act designed to prevent and combat money laundering and terrorism financing. Global and local regulators are established worldwide to prevent financial crimes.
- Acronyms (colloquial): AML
- Nicknames: Anti-Money Laundering
- Enacted by: the 117th United States Congress
- Effective: December 29, 2022

Citations
- Public law: Pub. L. 117–328 (text) (PDF)
- Statutes at Large: 31 U.S.C. 5323 Stat. U.S.C. 532/pdf/STATUTE-31 U.S.C. 5323-PgI.pdf I

Legislative history
- Introduced in the Senate as S. 3316; Passed the Senate on December 7th, 2022 (); Signed into law by President Joe Biden on December 29, 2022

The Anti-Money Laundering Improvement Act (AML) is a collection of regulations and laws in the United States aimed at combating money laundering and terrorist financing. The act builds upon the Bank Secrecy Act (BSA), the first anti-money laundering enforcement law.

== History ==
=== Overview of Act ===
The Anti-Money Laundering Improvement Act established national and international policies to prevent and combat money laundering and terrorist financing.

It protects the integrity of financial institutions by detecting money laundering activities, which involve converting illegally obtained funds into legitimate assets through complex transactions and disguising the proceeds as lawful funds.

The act is part of the Bank Secrecy Act, a specific piece of U.S. legislation focusing on reporting and record-keeping requirements for financial institutions. The Anti-Money Laundering Act refers to a broader set of international and national laws and regulations aimed at combating money laundering and related financial crimes.

The two acts are interconnected, with the BSA forming a significant part of the U.S. AML regime, which requires financial institutions to have strict "Know Your Customer" (KYC) policies and mandates the filing of "Suspicious Activity Reports" (SARs).

Illegal activities covered under AML include failure to implement the Bank Secrecy Act, tax evasion, drug trafficking, human trafficking, arms dealing, sanctions-busting, foreign corruption and bribery, as well as conduct to conceal the "beneficial ownership" of money.

=== Amendments ===
==== 2001, Under the USA Patriot Act ====
On September 11, 2001, the USA PATRIOT Act (Uniting and Strengthening America by Providing Appropriate Tools Required to Intercept and Obstruct Terrorism Act of 2001) was passed to penalize and detect money laundering and terrorist financing.

This act requires financial institutions to develop anti-money laundering programs by establishing internal policies, appointing compliance officers, and conducting employee training.

==== 2021, As Part of the National Defense Authorization Act ====
On January 1, 2021, Congress passed the Anti-Money Laundering Act of 2020 as Division F of the William M. Thornberry National Defense Authorization Act (NDAA).

This act expanded the political framework for anti-money laundering, initially established under the Bank Secrecy Act in 1970. The Act requires the Financial Crimes Enforcement Network (FinCEN) to work closely with national security and law enforcement partners to identify risks and provide feedback to industry partners.

==== 2022, Included in the Omnibus Bill Signed by President Joe Biden ====
On December 23, 2022, Congress included the Anti-Money Laundering Whistleblower Improvement Act (S.3316/H.R. 7195) in the Consolidated Appropriations Act, 2023 omnibus signed by President Joe Biden.

The act included several amendments to the Anti-Money Laundering Act, aligning it with other successful whistleblower programs. Overall, the act was established to target Russian oligarchs and incentivize whistleblowers worldwide to report money laundering and sanction schemes.

== AML cases ==
=== Howard Wilkinson ===
Howard Wilkinson, a whistleblower whose effort exposed the largest money laundering scheme in history. From 2007 to 2014, a Danske Bank branch located in Estonia had been involved in the laundering of up to $235 billion U.S. dollars out of Russia rubles, the money was converted to dollars moved to U.S through Bank of America, J.P. Morgan, and Deutsche Bank.

On December 13, Danske Bank pled guilty and agreed to settle charges by U.S. authorities that the bank defrauded U.S. banks and misled investors about its customer base and AML control.

=== Bittrex ===
In 2022, Bittrex, a global cryptocurrency exchange money service business received a civil penalty of $29,280,829 for violating the Bank Secrecy Act (BSA) and FinCEN implementing regulations.

From February 2014 through December 2018, Bittrex failed to maintain an effective AML program, and addressed risk associated with the product and services it offered, including anonymity-enhanced cryptocurrencies.

Bittrex conducted over 116,000 transactions valued over $260 million with entities and individuals located in a jurisdiction subject to OFAC sanctions, with transactions with entities and individuals operating from OFAC-sanctioned jurisdictions such as Iran, Cuba, Sudan, Syria, and Crimea.

=== BitMEX ===
In 2022 BitMEX, a cryptocurrency exchange trading platform failed to maintain a compliant anti-money laundering and customer identification program, and to report suspicious activity.

BitMEX received a civil monetary penalty of $100 million from FinCEN for violating the Bank Secrecy Act (BSA). This involved transactions involving high-risk jurisdiction, fraud schemes, darknet markets, and unregistered money service businesses providing mixing services were conducted equating to $209 million.

BitMEX failed to report a Suspicious Activity Report (SAR) on 588 suspicious transactions.
