= Cazadores de Fake News =

Cazadores de Fake News is an open community website from Venezuela dedicated to fact-checking information about Venezuela that is either disseminated by Venezuelans or affects them. The platform is part of the Venezuelan fact-checking coalition C-Informa and the International Fact-Checking Network (IFCN).

In 2023, Cazadores de Fake News received the Inter American Press Association's Award for Journalistic Excellence—alongside the C-Informa coalition— for the work "Exposed: The Disinformation Factory in Venezuela Endangers Democracy in Venezuela," and in 2026, the website received an Emmy Award for a documentary about Venezuelans held at the Terrorism Confinement Center (CECOT) in El Salvador.

== History ==
The platform started to operate in 2019. During the 2021 Cuban protests, Cazadores de Fake News analyzed the #SOSCuba hashtag trend, stating that although anomalous accounts—including bots, botnets, and cyborgs—participated generating spam, the trend started to be promoted organically, beginning with Cubans on the island who, from July 11 onwards, were supported by users from various countries in the Americas and Europe. Following the publication of the report, the Cuban government blocked Cazadores de Fake News in the country.

On July 4, 2024, the Venezuelan monitoring portal VESinFiltro reported and denounced the blocking of the Cazadores de Fake News website in Venezuela by the state-owned operator CANTV and the private operators Movistar, Digitel, and Inter, as well as again in September 2026
