= Unitary Platform =

Democratic Unitary Platform Plataforma Unitaria Democrática
- Abbreviation: PUD; PU; Unidad
- Leader: María Corina Machado
- Secretary-General: José Luis Cartaya
- Spokesperson: Omar Barboza
- Founded: 21 April 2021; 5 years ago
- Preceded by: Democratic Unity Roundtable
- Ideology: Liberal democracy Anti-Chavismo
- Political position: Big tent
- National Assembly: 9 / 277
- Latin American Parliament: 0 / 12
- Mercosur Parliament: 0 / 23
- Governors: 3 / 23
- Mayor: 62 / 335
- State legislatures: 50 / 253

The Democratic Unitary Platform (Spanish: Plataforma Unitaria Democrática, PUD), or just the Unitary Platform (Spanish: Plataforma Unitaria, PU), is a Venezuelan opposition political alliance made up of civil society, trade unions, retired military personnel, political parties, and deputies of the 2016–2021 National Assembly.

== History ==
On April 21, 2021, Juan Guaidó presented a document on a new opposition alliance called the Unitary Platform, which integrates civil society, trade unions, retired military personnel, political parties and deputies of the National Assembly elected for the period 2016-2021 with more inclusive and comprehensive features. At the end of June 2021, the National Electoral Council (CNE) rehabilitated the Democratic Unity Roundtable (MUD) as a national political party in order to participate in 2021 regional elections. On August 31, 2021, the MUD rejoined the Venezuelan electoral landscape with the support of the Unitary Platform, but with the use of the MUD card and the coalition is rehabilitated by the CNE and the political parties belonging to the FAVL with the intention of participating in the regionals on November 21.

== Members ==
The following parties are part of the Unitary Platform:

Party		Ideology	Position	Leader	National Assembly
AD	Democratic Action (Note: Faction of the party, led by Henry Ramos Allup); Acción Democrática	Social democracy Venezuelan nationalism	Centre-left	Henry Ramos Allup	8 / 285
COPEI	Independent Political Electoral Organization Committee (Note: Faction of the party, led by Roberto Enríquez Lavaud); Comité de Organización Política Electoral Independiente	Christian democracy Catholic social teaching Christian humanism Social conservatism Subsidiarity	Centre to centre-right	Roberto Enríquez Lavaud	1 / 285
VP	Popular Will; Voluntad Popular	Social democracy Progressivism	Centre-left	Leopoldo López	0 / 285
PJ	Justice First; Primero Justicia	Big tent Humanism; Conservatism	Centre-right	Juan Pablo Guanipa	0 / 285
Convergencia	National Convergence; Convergencia Nacional	Social conservatism Christian democracy Social market economy Christian humanism	Centre to centre-right	Biagio Pilieri	0 / 285
EC	Citizen Encounter; Encuentro Ciudadano	Social liberalism	Centre-right	Delsa Solórzano	0 / 285
La Causa Я	Radical Cause; La Causa Radical	Radical democracy Democratic socialism Labourism; Radicalism	Centre-left	Andrés Velásquez	0 / 285
PRVZL	Project Venezuela; Proyecto Venezuela	Christian democracy Liberal conservatism Social conservatism	Centre-right	Henrique Salas Römer; Henrique Salas Feo	0 / 285

== Election results ==
=== Presidential ===
Election year	Name	Results	
Election year	Name	# of overall votes	% of overall vote
2024 (disputed)	Edmundo González	7,443,584	68.74 (#1)
2024 (disputed)	Member of "Democratic Unity Roundtable" party in coalition. Winner		

== See also ==
- Democratic Unity Roundtable
- Democratic Alliance (Venezuela)
- Free Venezuela Broad Front
