= Notitarde =

- Type: Daily newspaper
- Format: Tabloid
- Owner: UC Business
- Founder: Jiménez Márquez
- Founded: 9 August 1976
- Headquarters: Valencia, Carabobo State
- Country: Venezuela
- Circulation: 75,000 (weekdays); 92,000 (Sundays)
- Website: http://www.notitarde.com/

Notitarde is a major newspaper printed in the Central Region of Venezuela. Based in the city of Valencia in Carabobo State, it also circulates in the United Aragua, Cojedes, the east coast of Falcón and Yaracuy, and with less traffic directed to Caracas. Despite its name, Notitarde is a morning newspaper. It has a daily circulation of 75,000 rising to 92,000 on Sundays.

It was founded on 9 August 1976 by the Jiménez Marquez family. In 1989, it was acquired by Ricardo Degwitz, who decided to turn the paper into a morning. In 1997 it opened its new headquarters. Its main competitor in the region is El Carabobeño. To expand its offering, it was decided to publish an edition for Puerto Cabello and the coast, Notitarde La Costa whose main competition is the Diario La Costa.

== See also ==
- List of newspapers in Venezuela
