= 2023 Unitary Platform presidential primaries =

Venezuelan presidential primary elections

- 22 October 2023
- Registered: 20,694,124
- Turnout: 2,440,415 (11.79%)
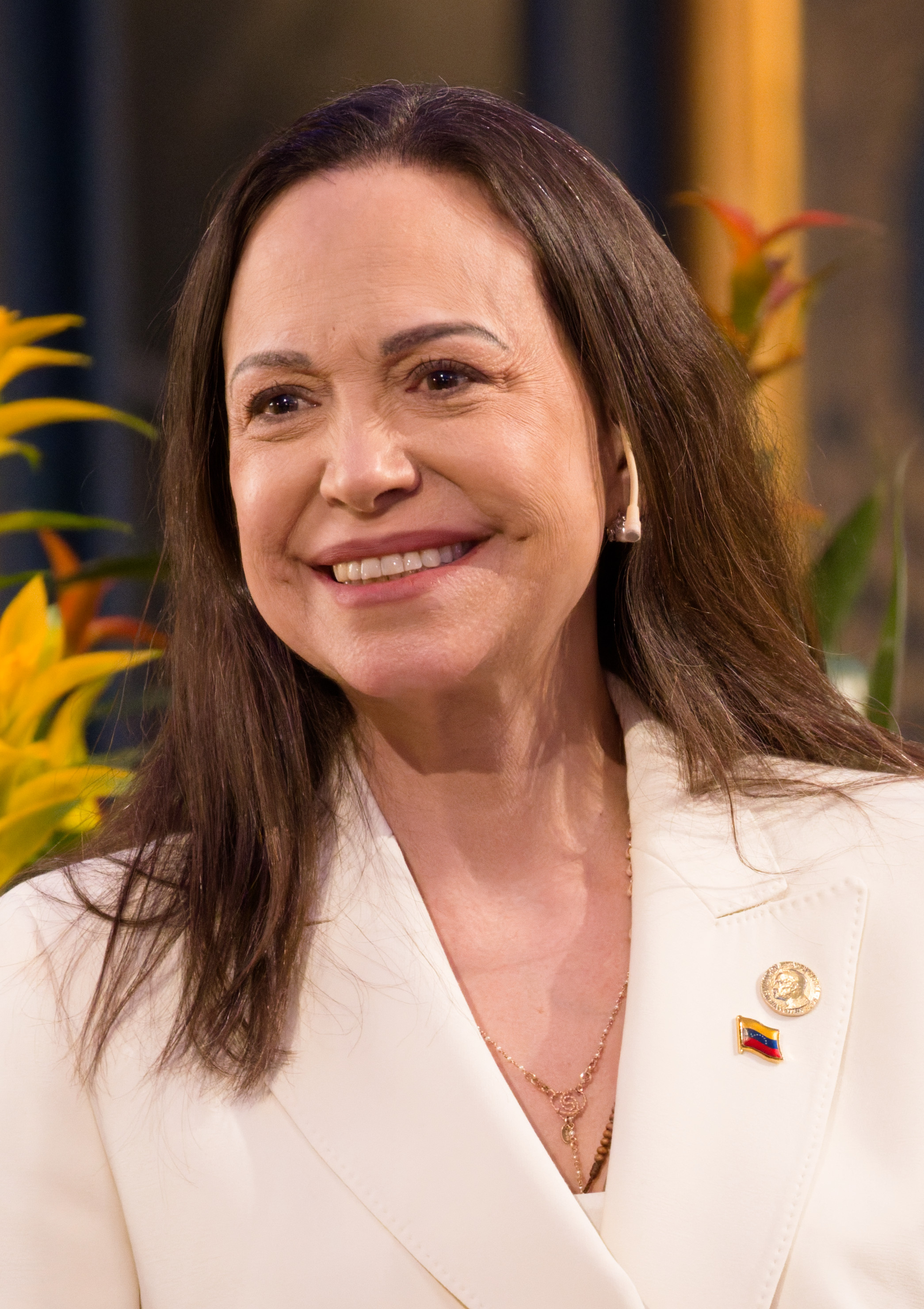

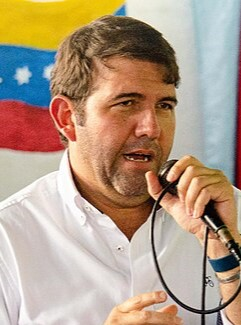
| Nominee | María Corina Machado | Carlos Prosperi |
| Party | Vente | Democratic Action |
| Alliance | Con Venezuela | – |
| Popular vote | 2,253,825 | 112,532 |
| Percentage | 92.35% | 4.61% |
Previous Unitary Platform nominee
Henrique Capriles
PJ
Unitary Platform nominee
María Corina Machado
Vente

The 2023 Unitary Platform presidential primaries were primary elections held on 22 October 2023, to choose the opposition candidate of the Unitary Platform coalition in the elections of the following year for the presidency of Venezuela. The first official announcement of the primaries was made on 16 May 2022 by the coalition, setting 2023 as the year in which such elections would be held. They were held in Venezuela, as well as in 29 countries and 77 cities abroad.

The primaries were independently organized by the National Primary Commission, without the assistance of the National Electoral Council and with the use of manual voting. Venezuelan NGOs and political parties have denounced the use of disinformation, death threats, and physical attacks by Chavismo supporters and by the National Liberation Army (ELN), a far-left Colombian guerrilla group, against opposition candidates.

== Timeline ==
=== June ===
On 3 June 2023 a group of women identified with the ruling party insulted and physically assaulted pre-candidate Henrique Capriles during a visit to Santa Inés, Carabobo state, in an attempt to disrupt his campaign.

On 30 June 2023, the Comptroller General announced that pre-candidate and former National Assembly member María Corina Machado was disqualified from holding public office for 15 years, linking her to alleged crimes of Juan Guaidó, as well as supporting international sanctions against the country. She can still participate in the opposition primaries because they are not regulated by Maduro's government. Capriles has the same sentence and cannot hold office until 2032. Analysts determined that the accusation of having participated in the interim was incoherent, taking into account that María Corina was not a member of the 2015 opposition National Assembly (being prevented by a disqualification from the Comptroller's Office), in addition to never having been appointed in any position in Guaidó's interim government. The disqualification has been considered illegal and unconstitutional by several jurists, including constitutional lawyer Allan Brewer Carías. The Latin American and Caribbean Network for Democracy cited the precedent of the Petro Urrego v. Colombia sentence of the Inter-American Court of Human Rights in 2020, which determined that "it is a serious violation of political human rights if an administrative authority, and not a judge through due judicial process, politically disqualifies a citizen".

=== July ===
On 10 July 2023, El Nacional reported militants of the Communist Party of Venezuela filed a writ of amparo to the Supreme Tribunal of Justice to appoint an ad hoc board considering to the party, saying that it is "kidnapped" by its general secretary Óscar Figuera. The action followed the pattern of the Democratic Action, Copei and Tupamaro parties, where new presidencies were imposed judicially, co-opting the name and symbols of the parties.

The same day, Venezuelan fact checking outlet Cazadores de Fake News denounced a discredit operation against María Corina Machado. The operation was promoted by a disinformation network that originally spread disinformation Leopoldo López, Juan Guaidó and other opposition politicians, and now focused in attacking María Corina.

On 12 July, eight out of the thirteen opposition candidates held a debate in the Universidad Católica Andrés Bello. It was the first presidential debate in Venezuela in 11 years, since 2012. The participants were María Corina Machado for Vente Venezuela, Carlos Prósperi for Democratic Action, Freddy Superlano for Popular Will, transgender candidate Tamara Adrián for Unidos por la Dignidad, Delsa Solórzano for Encuentro Ciudadano, Andrés Velásquez for La Causa R, César Pérez Vivas for Concertación Ciudadana and Andrés Caleca for Movimiento por Venezuela.

On 15 July, pro-government militants tried to attack María Corina during a campaign act in Vargas state. The following day, on 16 July, prevented a campaign rally in Petare, in the east of Caracas.

On 27 July, the Popular Will denounced that Freddy Superlano, the party's pre-candidate, had his passport taken away by Venezuelan authorities at the Atanasio Girardot international bridge on the border with Colombia.

On 22 July, Vente Venezuela denounced death threats to María Corina by the National Liberation Army (ELN), a far-left Colombian guerrilla group, after her campaign headquarters in La Fría, Táchira state, was painted overnight with messages such as "death to María Corina" and "primaries without María Corina", signed by the ELN. Four days later, the group denied being the authors of those threats.

=== August ===
On 12 August, pre-candidate Delsa Solórzano denounced death threats involving the ELN, including messages that reached her through social networks such as "the collective forces of the ELN are going to kill you". The Public Ministry announced that it would investigate these threats.

On 14 August, the Unitary Platform issued a communiqué rejecting statements by government authorities linking the opposition primaries to political violence.

On 15 August, supporters of Chavism attacked followers of Henrique Capriles in a rally in Apure state. According to his party, Justice First, this was the seventh aggression against the pre-candidate or his followers since 29 May.

=== October ===
On 12 October, Fuerza Vecinal requested the suspension of the primaries, arguing that "There were not conditions". On 21 October, the day before the primaries, the regulatory entity CONATEL prohibited several media from covering the elections, for which reason the main radio circuits in Venezuela had to suspend operations, as well as television channels. The fact was denounced by the National Union of Press Workers (SNTP).

== Public opinion ==
In September 2023, a Frequency 58 poll concluded that voters feared that the government would prevent the primary elections.

According to polls conducted by Delphos in October 2023, the primaries raised the motivation of Venezuelans, with 67% of the population supporting the idea of voting in the primaries, compared to 46% in November 2022.

== Conduct ==
In the early morning of 22 October, Acción Democrática candidate, Carlos Prosperi, insulted journalist Eugenio Martínez, calling him "mythomaniac", after Martínez questioned accusations about the process of appointment of board members.

The president of the National Primary Commission (CP), Jesus Maria Casal, offered the first balance of the primaries around 9:15 a.m., stating that by that time more than 70% of the polling stations had been installed and that by then no incidents had been registered.

In the morning, in the El Guarataro neighborhood of western Caracas, colectivos prevented the installation of the voting center in the area. The non-governmental organization Voto Joven denounced that the groups stole material from a voting table and that violence with a firearm was registered. Neighbors of the neighborhood installed the voting center after the intimidation. In Plaza La Estrella, in Caracas, the beginning of voting was postponed due to the intentional burning of garbage in the center of the voting point. Nuns of the Patronato San José de Tarbes denounced that voters who tried to participate were threatened by colectivos, and that the center had to be moved to another location. Also in the morning, armed civilians entered the voting point La Cañada, in San Juan parish, pointed at the coordinator of the voting center and took away a table during the beginning of the process, firing several shots.

In Santa Rosalía parish, motorcyclists threw a tear gas canister in the vicinity of the voting center. The point remained open and voters continued with the process. In the afternoon, two men fired shots into the air at the voting point in Las Acacias, Caracas. Voters temporarily dispersed before returning to the polling place again.

The vice-president of the Regional Board of Monagas state, Dexcy Moya, denounced that collectives shouted expletives and threats in several voting centers in Maturin.

From his polling station, Prosperi criticized again the organization of the primary elections, stating that in some polling stations there was no distribution of electoral material. Prosperi was booed by the voters present. A video was later leaked on social networks where Prosperi disowned in advance the results of the primaries, before they were announced. His party Acción Democrática rejected the statements, saying that "it does not represent the position of the party" and to be "firm with unity".

In Catia, Caracas, Chavistas played loud pro-government music during the process. Voters continued the process normally.

During the primaries there was a high turnout in traditionally pro-government areas of Carabobo state. The same happened in low income areas of Caracas, including Antímano, La Vega, El Valle and San Martín; in the case of the latter, even in spite of threats from colectivos. María Corina Machado voted in the elections with two of her sons. Henrique Capriles, Manuel Rosales and journalist Roland Carreño, recently released from prison, also voted. At his polling place, Jesús María Casal was greeted with the slogan "sí se puede" (yes we can). María Corina would later declare that "We have exceeded the expectations of the primaries".

== Results ==
The National Primary Commission announced that the transmission of primary results would be delayed due to a cyber-attack on the commission's servers. On Monday, 23 October, the third electoral bulletin of the National Primary Commission was delivered, where it was announced that with 92.65% counted, María Corina Machado maintained more than 90% of the votes. Machado won the opposition primary with 93% of the vote. (The approval rating of Maduro is around 10% in 2024. Critics say anyone who can enter the election can easily get a higher approval rating and win the election).

On 22 March 2024, Maria Corina Machado announced that historian and professor Corina Yoris was selected as the presidential candidate of the Venezuelan opposition due to Machado's disqualification.

Yoris was unable to officially register as a candidate in the presidential election, with Unitary Platform representatives saying that the electoral commission had blocked her registration. Following outcry from countries including the U.S., Brazil, Colombia, and Guatemala, the Unitary Platform registered former diplomat Edmundo González Urrutia as its temporary candidate; pending the selection of another one. On 19 April 2024, the Unitary Platform voted, alongside the cooperation of aspiring candidate Zulia Governor Manuel Rosales, to have González Urrutia be the only candidate that represents the Venezuelan opposition. Rosales accepted this result and withdrew from the race, leaving González Urrutia to be the official opposition candidate for the July election.

As of July 2024, González Urrutia is the official presidential candidate of the Unitary Platform for the upcoming election.
