= 2026 Venezuela protests =

- Part of Crisis in Venezuela, Protests against Nicolás Maduro and Delcy Rodríguez
- Date: c. September 2026 - present
- Location: Venezuela
- Caused by: Economic crisis; Power shortages; Food crisis; Opposition to the Rodriguez government
- Goals: Democratic elections no later than 2028; Reforms on the chronic blackouts and economic crisis
- Methods: Demonstrations and road blockades
- Status: Ongoing

Protests have occurred in Venezuela beginning at least since September 2026, following severe economic crisis, frequent power outages and calls for democratic elections. Since October 2026, the protests have expanded into nationwide protests, demanding for reforms to the power grids, following persistent blackouts since January 2026.

On 22 October 2026, nationwide protests took place throughout the country, organised by Marina Corina Machado's Vente Venezuela movement, demanding for democratic elections to take place no later than 2028. Many protesters that demonstrated on the day also called for reforms on the power outages. On 25 October, Machado returned from her exile in Panama city.

On 10 November, the Venezuelan government has proposed reforms on private investment and joint participations on the electric grid.

== Background ==
Venezuela has been in an economic crisis since 2010, with persistent outages as early as 2019. Following the 2026 United States intervention in Venezuela, many opposition governments have called for an interim government and the plans for a democratic election within Venezuela.

Since 2026, power outages have happened more frequently, including outages on hospital equipment. Reported by ANOVA Policy Research, only 6.9% of the population had access to electricity continuously, with 62.8% experiencing frequent blackouts and power shortages.

== Timeline ==
=== September ===
Throughout September, over 1,100 protests have been reported across the nation, averaging 37 a day. Many protests were opposition protests calling for democratic elections as well as demonstrations on the frequent power blackouts. As results of the frequent blackouts, many demonstrations have occurred during nighttime. Reports say the protests are mainly organised by communities and demographics range from the young to the elderly.

==== 24 September protests ====
On 24 September, thousands of protesters marched in Caracas demanding the return of the exiled opposition leader Marina Corina Machado, who currently is exiled to Panama City, with many protesters holding large Venezuelan flags as well as chanting "Marina Corina, we are waiting for you!". On 28 September, Machado's party reported three unsuccessful returns to the country.

==== 28 September follow-up protests ====
Following 24 September, protests continued to have happened across Venezuela, also affecting cities such as Caracas, Valencia, Maracaibo, Guanare and Maracay. In Maracaibo, militant contingents blockaded the roads to prevent a workers' protests.

=== October ===
Throughout October, demonstrations continued to take place in Venezuela, with methods used such as banging pots, kitchen utensils and pans historically known as “Cacerolazos” as well as blocking roads and setting fire to tires.

On 15 October, opposition parties called for a nationwide protests on 22 October.

==== 22 October protests ====
On 22 October, opposition and nationwide protests occurred in Caracas, Maracay, San Cristobal, Maracaibo and Valencia, with organizing an democratic election no later than 2028, restructuring the government and public institutions, release of political prisoners and political government reforms as the main demands, organized by Marina Machado’s Vente Venezuela movement. Protesters also highlighted economic crisis and public service deficiencies and have held up the Venezuelan flag as a form of protest symbols.

On 25 October, Machado returned to Venezuela, following 9 months in exile.

=== November ===
On 12 November, at least 36 prisoners have been going on the 3rd consecutive day of hunger strike in the Ramo Verde military prison near Caracas.

== Response ==
On 10 November, Venezuelan lawmakers approved and opened reforms for private investments and their participations on joint ventures in the energy sector.
