= Next Venezuelan presidential election =

- TBD
Alliance	PUD	GPPSB
Incumbent President
Delcy Rodríguez (acting)
PSUV

Under the 1999 constitution and a 2009 constitutional amendment, the president of Venezuela is elected for a six-year term by direct popular vote and may be re-elected indefinitely.

Nicolás Maduro, the outgoing Venezuelan president who was reelected to a disputed third term in 2024, was captured in Venezuela by the United States during a large-scale military operation and was extradited to New York to face narcotics-related charges, triggering a major political and constitutional crisis. Vice-president Delcy Rodríguez was installed as acting president by Venezuela's Supreme Tribunal of Justice (TSJ), which described Maduro's situation as a "temporary absence", leaving the timing of the next presidential election unclear.

== Background ==
=== Constitutional framework and term length ===
The Constitution of the Bolivarian Republic of Venezuela, adopted in 1999, sets the presidential term at six years. Article 230 establishes the length of the term, while a 2009 constitutional amendment removed term limits for the presidency and other elected offices, allowing indefinite re-election. Article 231 provides that the president-elect must take office on 10 January of the first year of the term by swearing an oath before the National Assembly, or before the Supreme Tribunal of Justice when circumstances prevent inauguration before the legislature. Article 233 regulates the "absolute absence" of the president (due to death, resignation, removal by the TSJ, permanent incapacity, abandonment of office or recall by referendum). If such an absence occurs in the first four years of the term, a new presidential election must be called within 30 days and the executive vice-president assumes the presidency on an interim basis; in the last two years, the executive vice-president completes the term. If the president is only deemed "temporarily unavailable", the executive vice-president may temporarily assume the presidency for 90 days, and—subject to the approval of the National Assembly—this interim period may be extended by another 90 days, for a total of six months.

=== 2024 presidential election ===
Presidential elections were held on 28 July 2024 to elect the president for the 2025–2031 term. The National Electoral Council (CNE) proclaimed Nicolás Maduro, candidate of the United Socialist Party of Venezuela (PSUV), re-elected with 6,408,844 votes, corresponding to 51.95% of valid ballots, according to official results reported by Venezuelan authorities.

The opposition Unitary Platform organised a parallel vote tally based on polling-station tally sheets and published results through the website resultadosconvzla.com indicating a clear victory for opposition candidate Edmundo González. An academic analysis of the opposition's dataset concluded that the opposition tally covered more than 80% of polling stations and suggested that González had received a significantly larger share of the vote than Maduro.

Several international organisations and governments questioned the credibility of the official results and criticised the lack of detailed polling-station data and the repression of post-electoral protests.

=== 2026 capture of Nicolás Maduro and interim presidency of Delcy Rodríguez ===
On 3 January 2026, United States forces carried out a large-scale operation in Venezuela that resulted in the capture of President Nicolás Maduro and his wife, Cilia Flores. More than 150 aircraft were involved in the attack, and Maduro was subsequently flown to New York to face long-standing U.S. indictments on drug trafficking and weapons charges.

U.S. President Donald Trump declared that the United States would "run" Venezuela until what he termed a safe transition and warned that further strikes were possible if the new authorities did not cooperate. The operation's legality was widely questioned at the United Nations and by international-law experts.

Shortly after the operation, the Supreme Tribunal of Justice ordered executive vice-president Delcy Rodríguez to assume the presidency on an interim basis. The armed forces publicly endorsed her as acting head of state. Initially Delcy Rodríguez condemned the U.S. action as an "illegal kidnapping", but within days she signalled a willingness to cooperate with Washington on Venezuela's future, in a shift reported by international media.

The United States has stated that it does not recognize Rodríguez as a democratically elected leader and has called for a transition culminating in "free and fair elections".

Venezuelan congressman and son of Nicolás Maduro, Nicolás Maduro Guerra, declared on 27 January that elections in Venezuela are "not on the table" as his father was "kidnapped".

In an interview for Politico on 5 February, María Corina Machado indicated that elections could be held in Venezuela in 9 to 10 months, using manual voting. She said that she had not discussed about elections with Trump. National Assembly president and brother of Delcy, Jorge Rodríguez ruled out the possibility of elections in the near future in an interview for Newsmax. In an interview for NBC on 12 February, Delcy Rodríguez was asked if she will hold free and fair elections, she answered "absolutely" adding it will be decided as part of the "political dialogue." Also interviewed for the NBC, US Secretary of Energy Chris Wright, speaking from Caracas, said that elections could be held in the Venezuela before the end of second presidency of Donald Trump, and added about Machado that he "listened to her in a podcast a few days ago, she was asked that question: how fast can they hold elections in Venezuela? What do you think should happen, María? And she said to get it, probably the fastest it could be done it probably takes 9 to 10 months to get there. So I think she is realistic about what the changes that need to happen. Some say we should hold elections tomorrow, those have no chances of being free and fair." and added "Ultimately what the long term political leadership is going be, it’s going to be up to Venezuelans." During a conference in Saint Kitts and Nevis with other Caribbean nations on 25 February, United States Secretary of State Marco Rubio said that the US recognizes the need for fair, democratic elections in Venezuela, saying "We do believe that a prosperous, free Venezuela who’s governed by a legitimate government who has the interests of their people in mind could also be an extraordinary partner and asset to many of the countries represented here today." Juan Pablo Guanipa, ally of Machado and political prisoner released during a mass political prisoner release in Venezuela in 2026, said for Spanish newspaper El País, that elections are under way and that Chavismo has lost its ability to impose conditions.

=== Transition talks ===
In June 2026, representatives of the government and opposition held U.S.-backed talks in Caracas. The meeting, involving National Assembly president Jorge Rodríguez and former opposition lawmaker Dinorah Figuera, who was previously in exile, was described by participants as an effort to establish a platform for strengthening democracy and political stability. The United States welcomed the talks and stated that discussions included rebuilding democratic institutions, strengthening the National Electoral Council (CNE), restoring guarantees for political participation, and expanding civic freedoms.

On 14 July 2026, the opposition-led National Assembly elected in 2015 and the incumbent National Assembly controlled by the government separately announced that a joint working agenda would begin on 1 August 2026. The statement issued by the 2015 National Assembly described the initiative as a roadmap to promote democratic institutions, electoral reforms, political participation, and national reconstruction following the June 2026 earthquakes. It also expressed appreciation for United States humanitarian assistance and support for democratic institutions. U.S. Secretary of State Marco Rubio shared the opposition communiqué on social media shortly after its publication, signaling support for the initiative.

On the same day, National Assembly president Jorge Rodríguez issued a separate communiqué confirming the start of the joint agenda, framing it as part of a national unity effort following the earthquakes and emphasizing reconstruction and social stability without explicitly referring to electoral reforms.

In September 2026, Interior minister Diosdado Cabello hinted 2028 as a possible year for election day, stating "I believe (the opposition) they'll go for 2028; whenever that is, the United Socialist Party of Venezuela will be there, ready to win."

In October 2026, opposition leader María Corina Machado, in her first substantive remarks since returning to Venezuela, said that the United States had proposed holding presidential elections in 2027. She stated that U.S. Secretary of State Marco Rubio had laid out a sequence of steps toward a democratic transition that included a 2027 vote. The Trump administration supports negotiations between the government and opposition groups that do not include Machado's Vente Venezuela movement, aimed at overhauling the electoral council and the top court ahead of the next elections.

== Electoral system ==
The president of Venezuela is elected by direct, secret ballot in a single nationwide constituency using plurality voting (first-past-the-post). Elections are organised and supervised by the National Electoral Council (CNE), one of the five constitutionally recognised branches of government, which oversees an automated voting system with electronic machines and paper audit trails.

Article 227 of the Constitution sets eligibility criteria for presidential candidates, including being Venezuelan by birth without another nationality, at least 30 years old and with no disqualifying criminal convictions, while Article 229 bars sitting executive vice-presidents, ministers, governors and mayors from running unless they leave office beforehand.

== Candidates ==
=== Declared candidates ===
- María Corina Machado (Vente Venezuela), Member of the National Assembly (2011–2014), leader of Vente Venezuela (since 2012) and 2025 Nobel Peace Prize laureate.
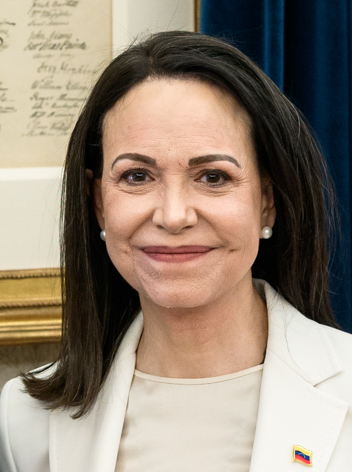
Former member of the National Assembly
María Corina Machado
(2011–2014)

=== Potential candidates ===
- Delcy Rodríguez (PSUV), Acting President of Venezuela (since 2026) and Vice President of Venezuela (2018–2026).
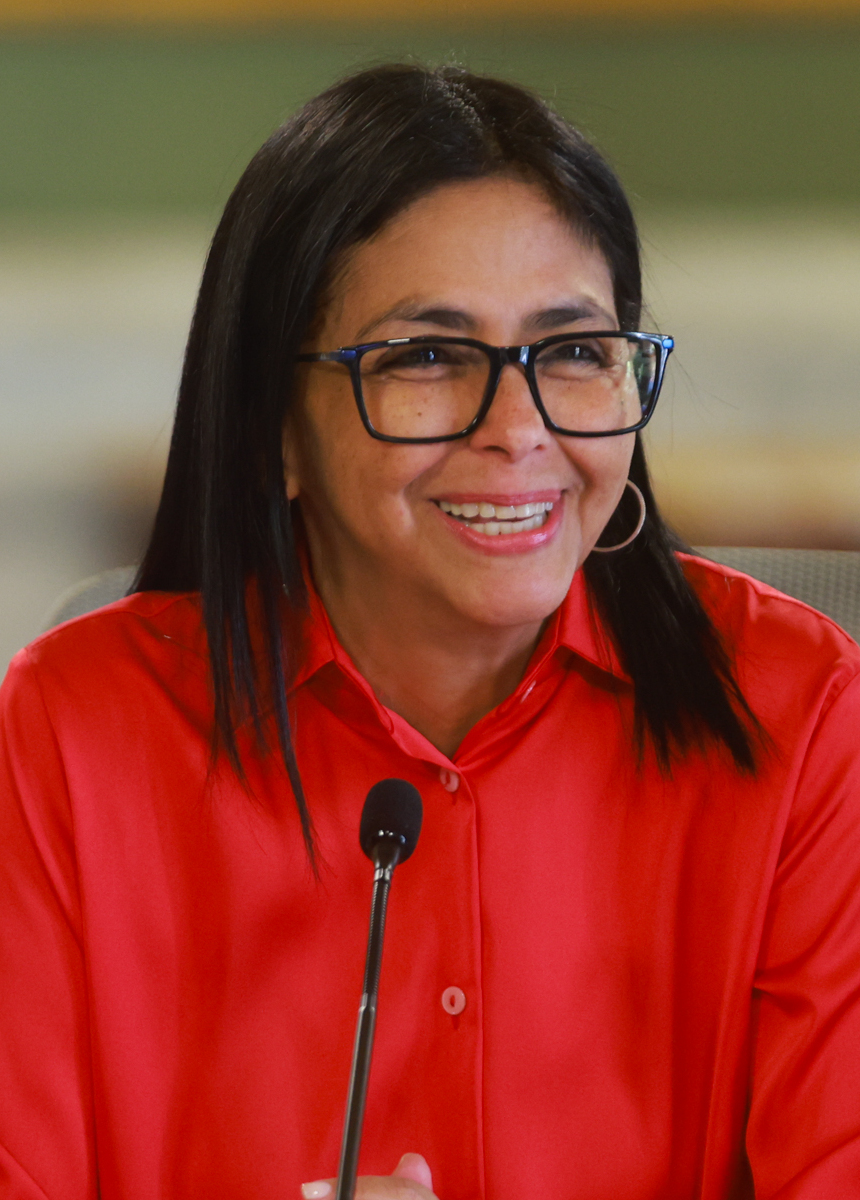
Acting President
Delcy Rodríguez
(since 2026)

== Opinion polls ==
Polling firm/Commissioner	Fieldwork date	Sample size												Others	Undecided
Polling firm/Commissioner	Fieldwork date	Sample size	Machado VV – PUD	González PUD	Rodríguez PSUV	Cabello PSUV	Guanipa PJ	Capriles UNICA	Márquez Centrados	J. Rodríguez PSUV	López VP	Mendoza Ind.	Guaidó Ind.	Others	Undecided
Meganalisis	26 Oct-1 Nov 2026	1,007	70.1	1.1	3.4	0.2	–	0.9	0.1	–	0.5	5.3	0.1	–	7.7
Meganalisis	23-30 Sep 2026	1,357	60.6	1.2	3.6	0.3	–	0.8	0.1	–	0.7	6.7	0.1	–	11.7
El Nodo88	2-10 Sep 2026	1,063	72.7	–	5.8	–	0.1	–	2.4	–	–	–	–	2.4 (Note: Elías Jaua (PSUV): 2.2 Gustavo Duque (FP): 0.2)	16.5
Meganalisis	24-30 Aug 2026	1,129	61.2	1.4	3.1	0.2	–	0.7	0.2	–	0.5	5.9	0.2	–	10.2
Hercon Consultores	1-28 Aug 2026	1,200	73.3	–	10.1	–	–	–	–	–	–	13.3	–	–	–
AtlasIntel	30 Jul-3 Aug 2026	1,110	57.4	–	17.7	–	–	–	–	–	–	9.0	–	5.0	11
Meganalisis	20-27 May 2026	1,119	74.5	–	3.9	0.7	–	0.3	0.1	0.2	0.4	–	–	–	19.9
Meganalisis	20-27 May 2026	1,119	69.8	–	3.7	0.6	4.9	–	–	–	–	–	–	2.1	18.9
Meganalisis	13–20 Apr 2026	1,113	76.2	–	3.8	0.7	–	0.4	0.1	0.3	0.5	–	–	–	17.9
Meganalisis	13–20 Apr 2026	1,113	71.2	–	3.9	0.7	4.1	–	–	–	–	–	–	1.9	17.9
Poder y Estrategia	March 2026	1,000	63	16	10	–	–	–	3	–	–	–	–	8	–
Meganalisis	24–31 Mar 2026	1,007	68.9	0.9	3.1	0.8	4.9	–	–	–	–	–	–	3.2	18.2
Meganalisis	18–25 Feb 2026	1,024	70.6	0.3	2.7	1.9	5.6	–	–	–	–	–	–	2.3	16.6
Gold Glove/Financial Times	24–30 Jan 2026	1,000	67.0	–	25.0	–	–	–	–	–	–	–	–	–	–
Premise/The Economist	9–13 Jan 2026	600	~48.0	~9.0	~11.0	–	–	~2.0	–	–	–	–	–	~30.0	–
Meganalisis	5–11 Jan 2026	1,000	78.3	1.2	–	3.1	–	–	–	–	–	–	–	3.0	14.4
AtlasIntel/Bloomberg	5–11 Jan 2026	1,539	38.2	5.3	8.7	1.5	–	–	–	–	–	–	–	15.0	31.2
Afiches	5–8 Jan 2026	820	28	17	7	–	–	–	–	–	–	–	–	16	32

== See also ==
- 2024 Venezuelan presidential election
- 2025 Venezuelan parliamentary election
- Elections in Venezuela
- Venezuelan presidential crisis
