= Corina Parisca =

Venezuelan psychologist and former tennis player

- Born: 23 December 1940 (age 85); Caracas, Venezuela
- Other names: Corina Parisca Pérez; Corina Parisca de Machado
- Education: Central University of Venezuela
- Spouse: Henrique Machado Zuloaga
- Children: Four, including María Corina
- Parent: Carlos Parisca Mendoza

Corina Parisca Pérez de Machado (born 23 December 1940) is a Venezuelan psychologist and former tennis player. She won the National Tennis Championship in 1959 and represented Venezuela at the Pan American Games of the same year. She co-founded the Atenea Foundation, focused on care for orphaned and delinquent Caracas street children, with her eldest daughter, María Corina Machado.

== Biography ==
Corina Parisca Pérez de Machado was born in Caracas; her father was Carlos Parisca Mendoza.

Parisca began playing tennis at the age of 11 at the Valle Arriba Golf Club in Caracas. She defeated champion Nena Xalabarder to win the club's children's championship, and subsequently participated in the Inter-Club and National Championships at the Altamira Tennis Club, also in Caracas. In 1959 she won the National Championship title and that same year represented Venezuela at the Pan American Games in the United States.

Parisca is a psychologist graduated from the Central University of Venezuela. In 1992, she co founded the Atenea Foundation together with her daughter, María Corina Machado, focused on the reintegration of children at risk of exclusion in the country.

Following the 2024 Venezuelan presidential elections, Parisca was under house arrest and her home was surrounded by officials from the General Directorate of Military Counterintelligence (DGCIM). Similar to the extraction of those detained in the 2024 siege of the Argentine Embassy in Caracas, she was safely removed from Venezuela to the United States.

== Personal life ==
Parisca married businessman Henrique Machado Zuloaga, with whom she had four daughters; the eldest, Maria Corina, was awarded the 2025 Nobel Peace Prize.
