= Corina Yoris =

Venezuelan politician and academic (born 1944)

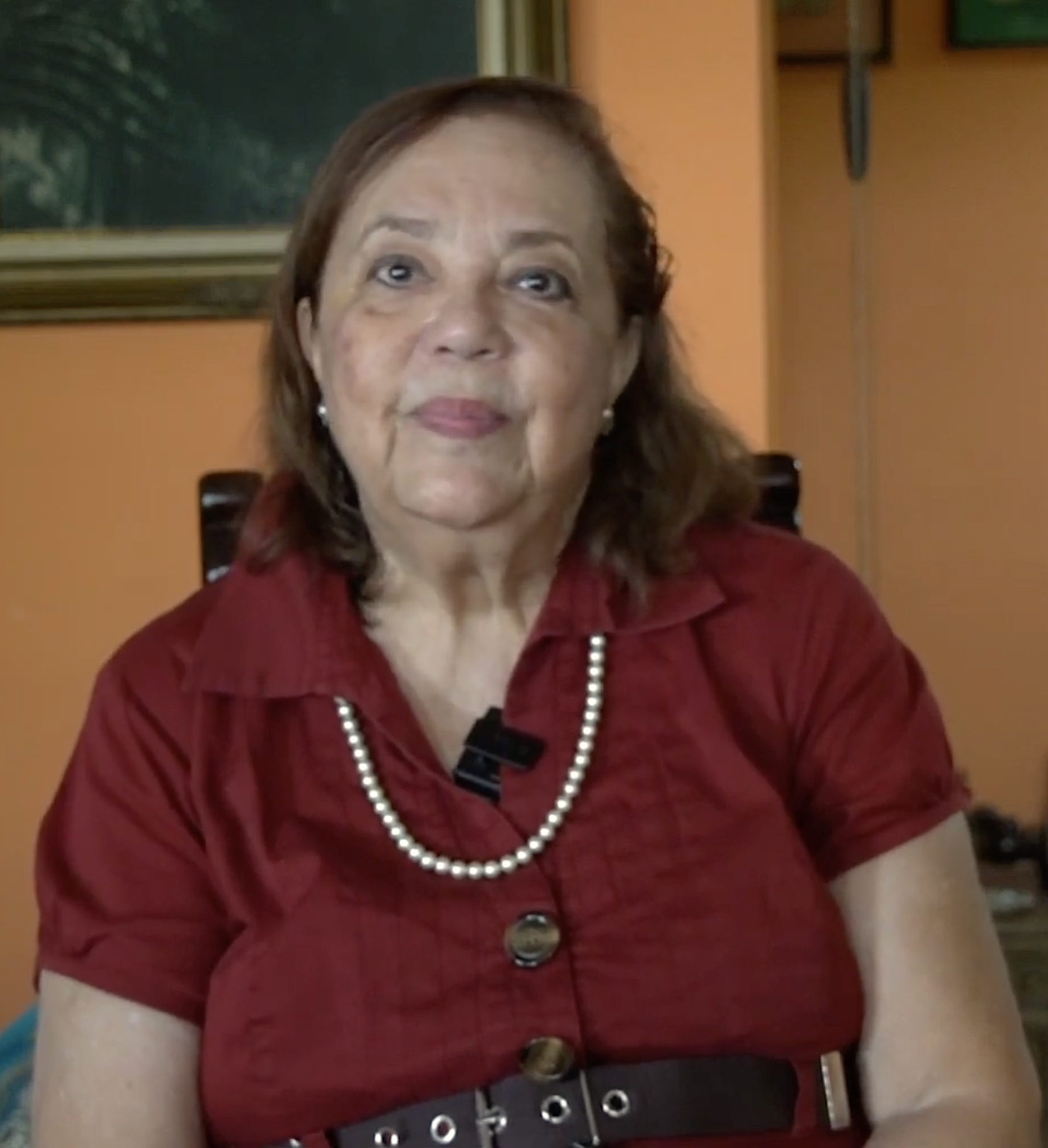
- Yoris in 2024

Member of National Primary Commission of Venezuela
- In office 15 November 2022 – 22 October 2023

Personal details
- Born: 17 March 1944 (age 82) Caracas, Venezuela
- Party: Unitary Platform (since 2024)
- Education: Andrés Bello Catholic University Simón Bolívar University University of Salamanca
- Occupation: Philosopher, professor, politician

Corina Yoris Villasana (born March 17, 1944) is a Venezuelan philosopher and professor, who was the Unitary Platform candidate in the 2024 Venezuelan presidential election, as the replacement for María Corina Machado, who was politically disqualified. Yoris was unable to register and was replaced by Edmundo González Urrutia.

== Biography ==
=== Academic career ===
Yoris was born in Caracas and graduated in Letters and Philosophy from the Universidad Católica Andrés Bello (UCAB) in 1980 and 1981, respectively, where she also obtained her PhD in history in 1999. She holds a master's degree in Latin American Literature from Universidad Simón Bolívar (USB) in 1993 and another in Logic and Philosophy of Science from Universidad de Salamanca, Spain. Her final master's thesis, entitled "Analogy and argumentative force", was awarded the "Federico Riu Award for Philosophical Research" in the category of Short Essay.

Yoris held the position of director of the School of Philosophy at UCAB between 1992 and 1998, director of the Philosophy graduate program from 1997 and of the Humanities and Education Area at the UCAB graduate program between 2007 and 2011. She has also been a columnist for El Nacional and a professor at the Universidad Metropolitana.

At the institutional level, she has played several roles in both national and international institutions. She was president of the Venezuelan Society of Philosophy and the Venezuelan Society of Logic, member of the Mexican Academy of Logic, member of the Inter-American Society of Philosophy, member of the International Étienne Gilson Society and vice-president for South America of the Ibero-American Philosophy Network (Red Iberoamericana de Filosofía). On 19 March 2024, she was appointed as a full member of the Venezuelan Academy of Language.

== Political career ==
On 9 November 2022, she was appointed by the Unitary Platform as a principal member of the National Primary Commission, whose function was to organize the primary elections of the opposition coalition ahead of the 2024 presidential election that was held on 28 July.

María Corina Machado, an opposition candidate who was disqualified by the Comptroller General, announced on 22 March 2024 that Yoris would be the presidential candidate for both Unitary Platform and A New Era, the only political organizations authorized by the electoral body to participate in the elections, as well as other sectors of the Venezuelan opposition grouped in the Gran Alianza Nacional (GANA). Yoris, unlike other opposition leaders, has not held public administration positions and is politically qualified according to the National Electoral Council's system. Yoris was unable to register as a presidential candidate despite claiming to have made repeated attempts and was replaced by temporary candidate Edmundo González Urrutia, who was allowed to register.

=== Political views ===
Yoris is opposed to socialism and communism; she says that the free market regulates prices, that communism was responsible for the death of millions and that the ideology resulted with Venezuela becoming divided.

== Academic publications ==
- Yoris, Corina (2005). Introducción a la lógica problemario. Universidad Católica Andrés Bello. ISBN 978-980-244-109-9
- Yoris-Villasana, C. (2004). El Caribe tiene nombre de mujer: identidad cultural en la literatura del Caribe anglófono: Jean Rhys. Venezuela: Grupo Editorial Eclepsidra.
- Yoris-Villasana, Corina (2000). «Interpretación de algunos cambios en la teoría lingüística desde la concepción de ciencia de Karl Popper». Revista de filosofía 17 (36): 75–88. ISSN 0798-1171
- Yoris-Villasana, Corina (2004). 18 de octubre de 1945: legitimidad y ruptura del hilo constitucional. Universidad Católica Andrés Bello. ISBN 978-980-6396-19-7
- Yoris-Villasana, C. (2004). 18 de octubre de 1945: legitimidad y ruptura del hilo constitucional. Venezuela: Academia Nacional de la Historia.
- Yoris-Villasana, C. (2014). Analogía y fuerza argumentativa. Venezuela: Universidad Católica Andrés Bello.
