= Edmundo González =

Venezuelan politician and diplomat (born 1949)

Edmundo González ONM OSP
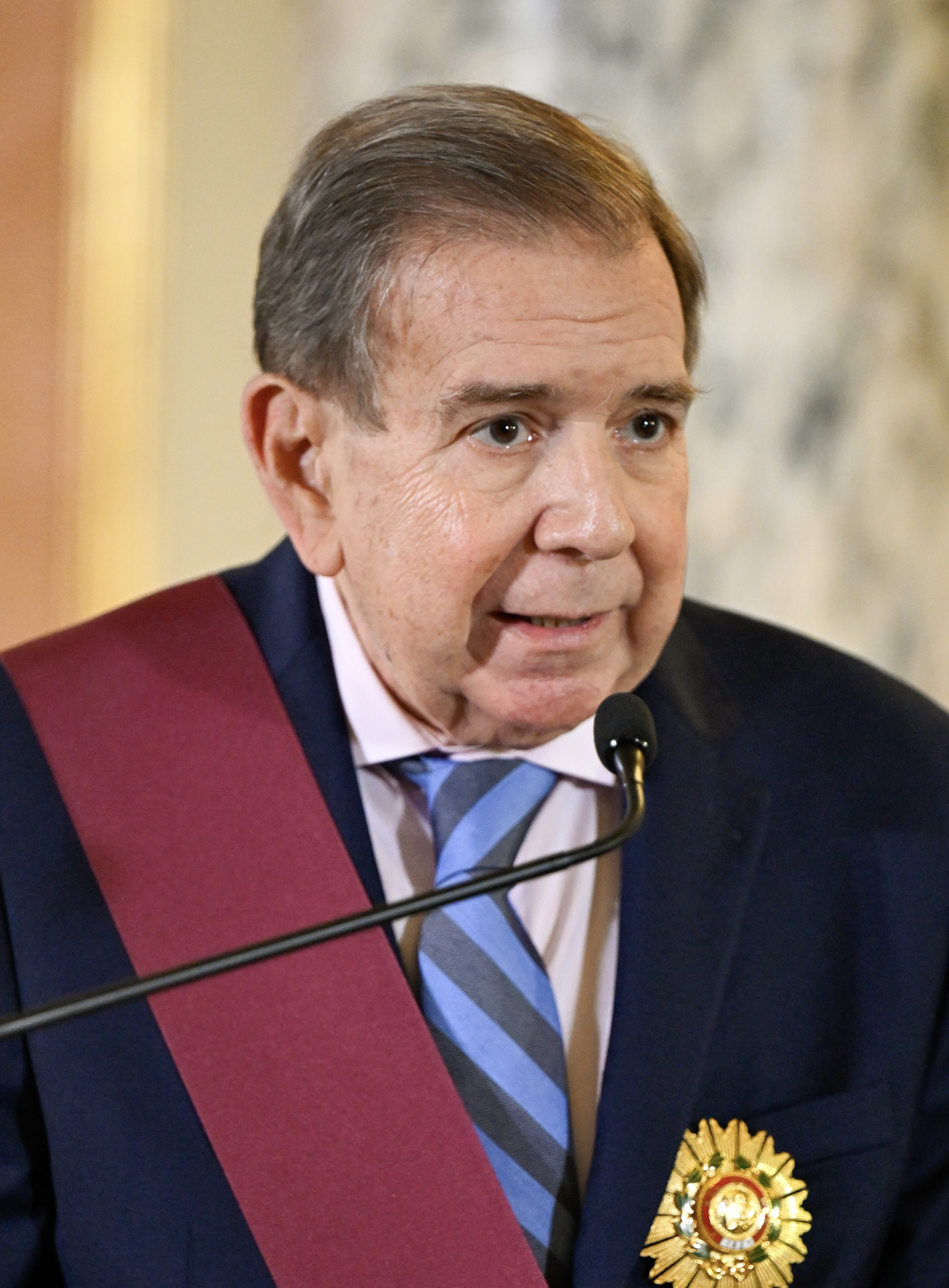
- González in 2025

President-elect of Venezuela (Partial recognition)
- Disputed (Note: Following the 2024 Venezuelan presidential election, the Venezuelan opposition released detailed election results (vote tallies) claiming that González won the election. Statisticians agreed that González won the election. The National Electoral Council officially declared total vote counts, did not publish vote tallies, and disputed the opposition and statisticians' analyses, asserting that Maduro won the election.)
- Assumed role 28 July 2024 (Note: González intended to be sworn in when the presidential term began on 10 January 2025, but was unable to do so due to his alleged victory not being recognized by the National Electoral Council.); Disputed with Nicolás Maduro
- Succeeding: Nicolás Maduro

President of the Democratic Unity Roundtable
- Incumbent
- Assumed office 24 August 2021
- Preceded by: Ramón José Medina

Ambassador of Venezuela to Argentina
- In office 8 November 1998 – 12 July 2002
- President: Rafael Caldera; Hugo Chávez

Ambassador of Venezuela to Algeria
- In office 1991–1993
- President: Carlos Andrés Pérez

Personal details
- Born: Edmundo González Urrutia; 29 August 1949 (age 77) La Victoria, Aragua, United States of Venezuela (Present-day, La Victoria, Aragua, Venezuela)
- Party: Independent (affiliated with the MUD)
- Other political affiliations: PU (since 2021)
- Spouse: Mercedes Marina López (m. 1973)
- Children: 2
- Education: Central University of Venezuela (BA); American University (MA)
- Occupation: Diplomat; politician; political analyst; professor; writer
- Awards: Sakharov Prize (2024)
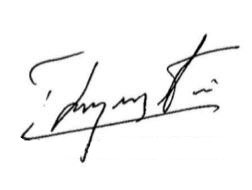
- Signature

Edmundo González Urrutia (born 29 August 1949) is a Venezuelan politician, analyst, and diplomat. An opposition figure, he is a member of the Unitary Platform political alliance. González was its candidate in the 2024 Venezuelan presidential election. González has previously served as the Venezuelan ambassador to Argentina and Algeria. He also sits on the editorial board of El Nacional.

A national and international political crisis erupted following the Venezuelan government's announcement that incumbent Nicolás Maduro won the 2024 election against González, which analysts argue was not based on the actual votes cast. The reactions of the international community were divided: some countries including the U.S., most European nations, and some Latin American countries (such as Argentina, Costa Rica, Peru, and Uruguay) rejected the official results and recognized González as the election winner, while others including, Vietnam, Russia, China, Iran, North Korea, Cuba, Bolivia (Note: Bolivia changed its position on the election following the inauguration of President Rodrigo Paz on 8 November 2025, recognizing González as the president-elect of Venezuela.), and Honduras recognized Maduro as the winner.

Maduro did not cede power, and instead asked the Supreme Tribunal of Justice (TSJ), composed of justices loyal to Maduro, to approve the results, which they did. An arrest warrant was issued for González, who was charged with "usurpation of functions, falsification of public documents, instigation to disobey the law, conspiracy and association"; he was granted asylum in Spain, leaving Venezuela on 7 September 2024. He was awarded the Sakharov Prize in December 2024, alongside María Corina Machado.

== Early life and education ==
González was born in La Victoria, Aragua, in 1949 to a schoolteacher and shopkeeper. He received a degree in international studies from the Central University of Venezuela and a Master of Arts in international relations from the American University in the United States in 1981.

== Diplomatic career ==
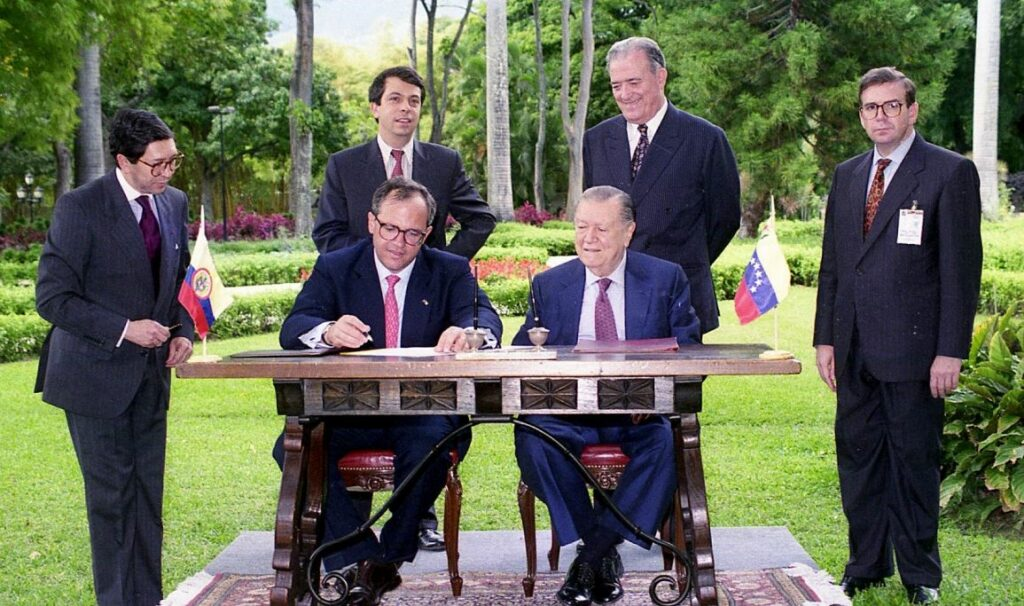
González (right side) on 6 September 1994 in La Casona, in a meeting between presidents Rafael Caldera and Ernesto Samper, when he was a foreign ministry official.

González began his diplomatic career working in the Ministry of Foreign Affairs of Venezuela. He was posted in El Salvador and Belgium before serving as a first secretary for the Venezuelan Ambassador to the United States in 1978.

From 1991 to 1993, González served as the Venezuelan Ambassador to Algeria. He was the Director General of International Policy at the Ministry of Foreign Affairs from 1994 to 1999. In November 1998, González arrived in Argentina beside the newly inaugurated president of Venezuela, Hugo Chávez, when he presented his credentials to serve as ambassador. While in Argentina, he promoted Venezuela's entry into Mercosur. His posting as ambassador to Argentina ended in July 2002.

González has had an extensive career in diplomacy as well as in academia and research. He has played an active role at the Fermín Toro Institute of Parliamentary Studies, serving as deputy director and coordinator of the Working Group on Monitoring the International System, where he has collaborated with prominent Venezuelan lawyers and politicians. He retained the diplomatic rank of career ambassador until his retirement in 2004, at the age of 55, and served as a visiting professor at the Universidad Metropolitana in Caracas.

== Political career ==
From 2013 to 2015, González served as the international representative of the Venezuelan opposition coalition, the Democratic Unity Roundtable (MUD). Following the resignation of Justice First politician Ramón José Medina in 2021 as president of the MUD—which had ceased to function as a coalition but continued to exist as a political party—González assumed the party’s presidency and held it at the time of the 2024 election.

González had previously served on the party's executive board alongside Medina, José Luis Cartaya, Luis Aparicio, and Óscar Barreto. The board formally retained the party’s electoral card and its registration with the National Electoral Council (CNE).

=== Presidential candidacy ===
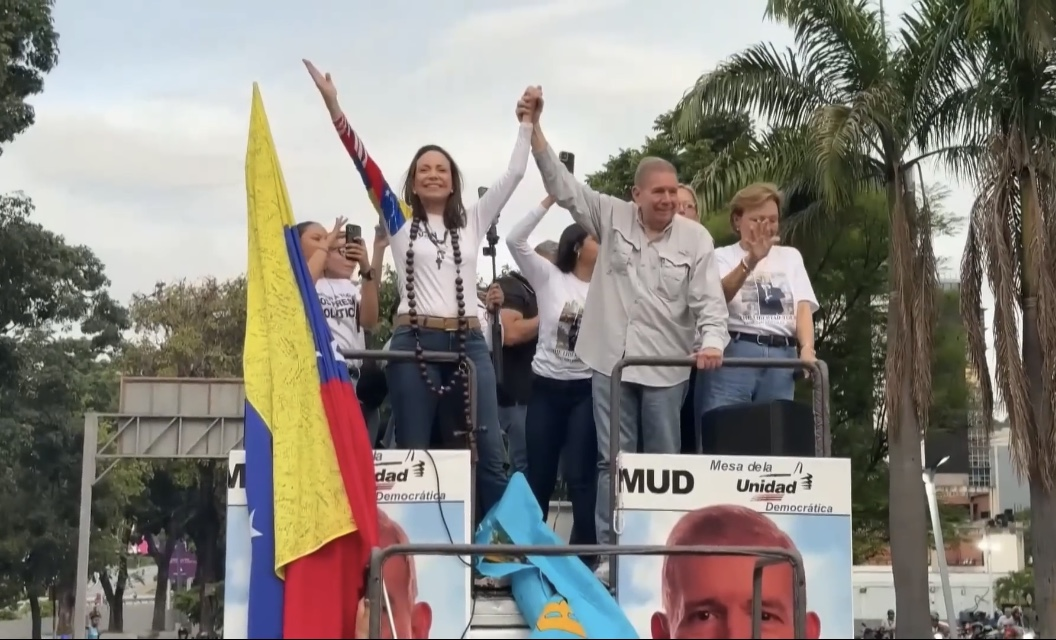
González (center) and his wife (right) campaigning with María Corina Machado (left) on 12 August 2024.

==== Background ====
After the National Electoral Council (CNE) declared María Corina Machado—who won the 2023 Unitary Platform presidential primaries—ineligible for holding political office in the 2024 Venezuelan presidential election and Machado's alternate candidate Corina Yoris faced complications preventing her from filing her candidacy, González was entered as a Unitary Platform presidential candidate. On 20 April, the other major opposition candidate Manuel Rosales suspended his candidacy and endorsed González. On 26 March 2024, the CNE confirmed that González had been registered as a candidate for the 2024 presidential election.

==== Platform ====
González stated in April 2024 in an interview with Agence France-Presse that "Venezuela must put aside [internal] struggles, political diatribe, confrontation, and we must all fight for Venezuela's recovery and transition. That is what's fundamental", arguing for his candidacy as one of "my contribution to unity, to the struggle for a democratic transition". González stated in the same interview that "I have no personal aspirations... never, never, never imagin[ing] I would be in this position, but that is secondary to the challenge ahead." González still refers to María Corina Machado as "the leader of the opposition" and "the leader of this unitary process". González stated his goal to be "bring[ing] Venezuelans together (and) the return[ing] of political exiles" followed by "the recovery of the economy and of democracy".

==== Election results ====
Academics, news outlets and the opposition provided strong evidence showing that González won the election by a wide margin. The Sunday Times described González as being "widely seen as the rightful winner" of the election. The CNE (electoral commission) published summary numbers, claiming a Maduro victory, without publishing the vote tallies. A political crisis followed. Most US aligned countries did not recognize Maduro as the winner, while non western aligned countries including China, Russia, Iran, Cuba, and North Korea did. Honduras, under President Xiomara Castro, maintained diplomatic relations with Venezuela and recognized the election results. On 30 July 2024, Nasry Asfura, who at the time was a Honduran opposition leader, publicly criticized Castro's support for Maduro.

The BBC and The Guardian reported that Peru was the first country to recognize González as Venezuela's president-elect on 30 July, a statement from the former Peruvian foreign minister that was corrected on 5 September by Peru's Council of Ministers after a new foreign minister was named. Peruvian President Dina Boluarte reinforced on 6 September that Peru's position with respect to Venezuela had not changed under the new foreign minister, saying: "We will not be part of an electoral fraud; we will not support a dictatorial government."

On 1 August, U.S. Secretary of State Antony Blinken stated that there was "overwhelming evidence" that González won the presidential election. On 2 August, Argentina recognized González as president-elect, while Uruguayan Foreign Minister Omar Paganini stated that there was an "overwhelming amount of information" whereby González may be considered the winner of the elections. On the same day, Costa Rica also recognized González's victory in the Venezuelan elections over Maduro. By 4 August, Ecuador and Panama recognized Edmundo González's victory. Maduro did not acknowledge the results published by the opposition which claimed he lost the election, and instead asked the Supreme Tribunal of Justice (TSJ), composed of justices loyal to Maduro, to audit and approve the results. On 22 August, as anticipated, the TSJ described the CNE's statement of Maduro winning the election as "validated".

=== Exile in Spain (2024–present) ===
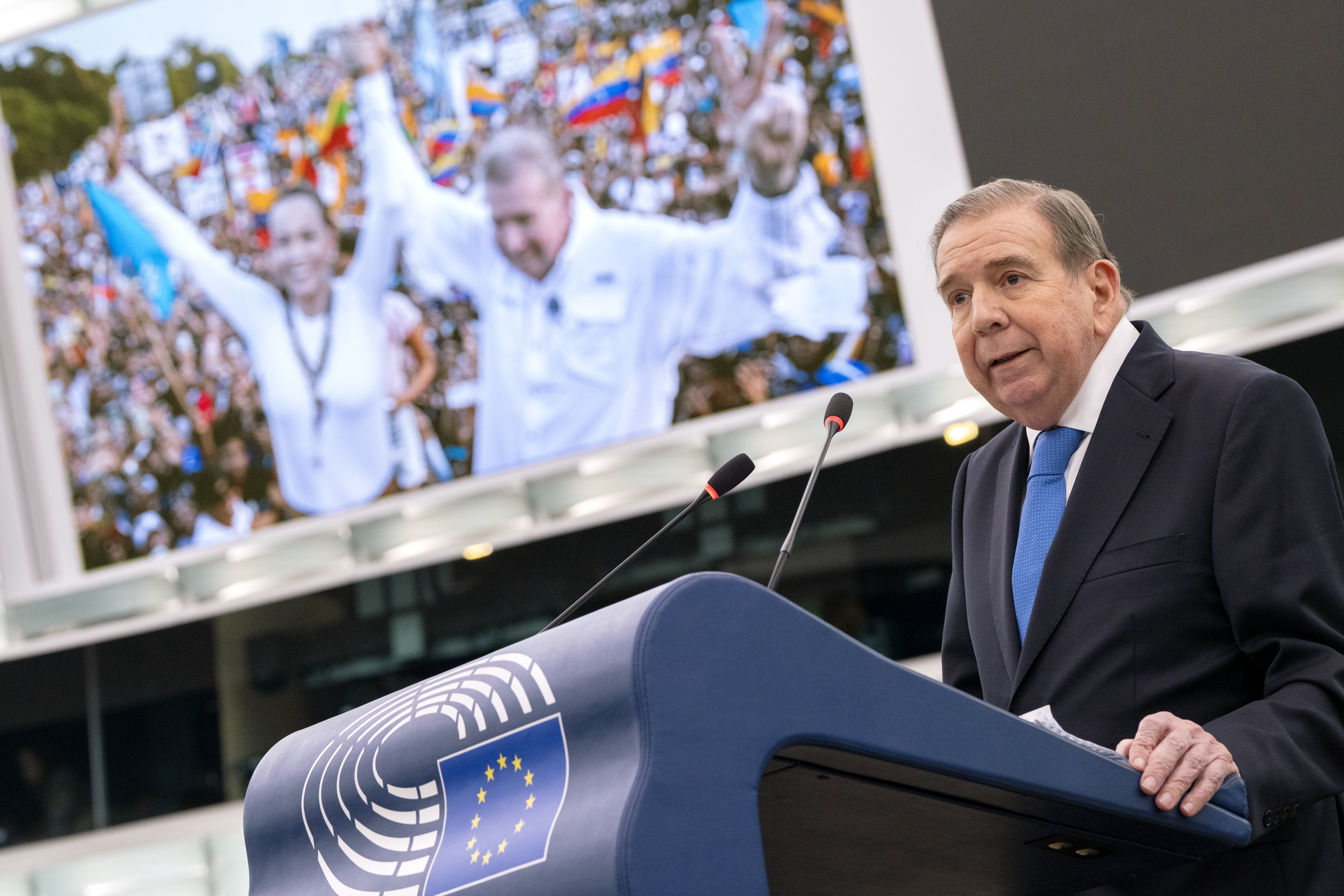
González adressing the European Parliament on 17 December 2024, at the 2024 Sakharov Prize ceremony.

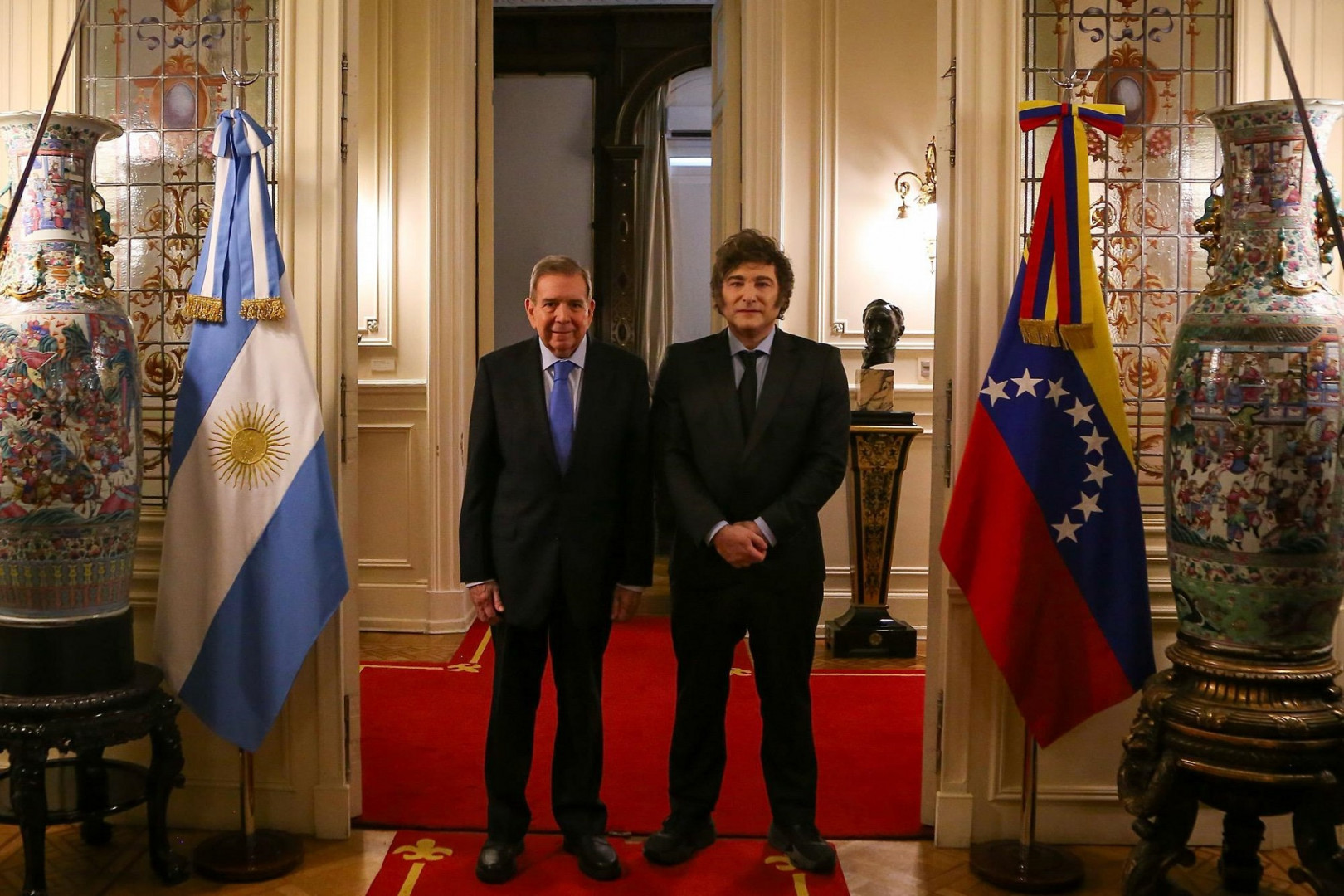
González (left) with President of Argentina Javier Milei at the Casa Rosada on 4 January 2025

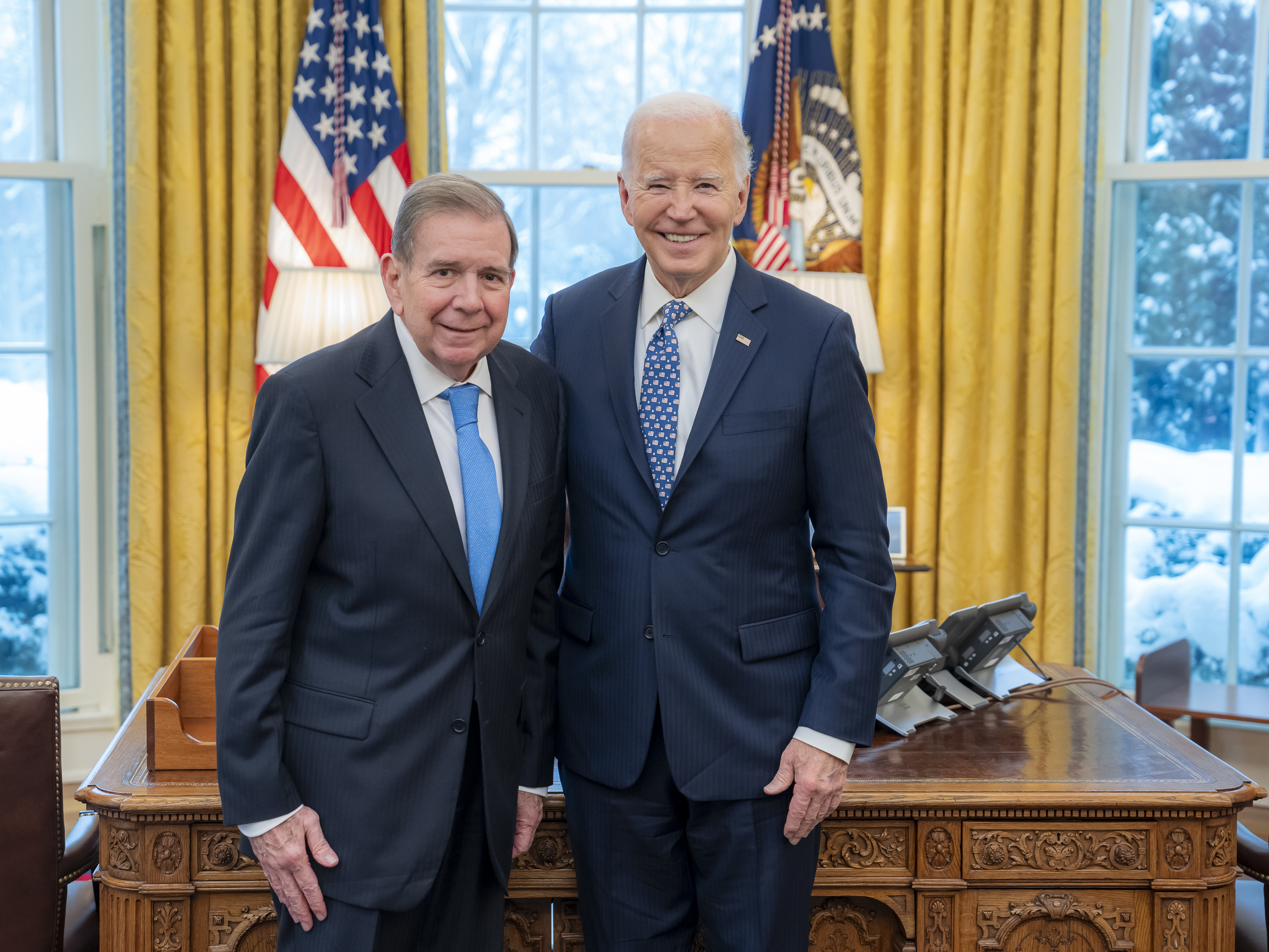
González (left) with U.S. President Joe Biden in the Oval Office on 6 January 2025

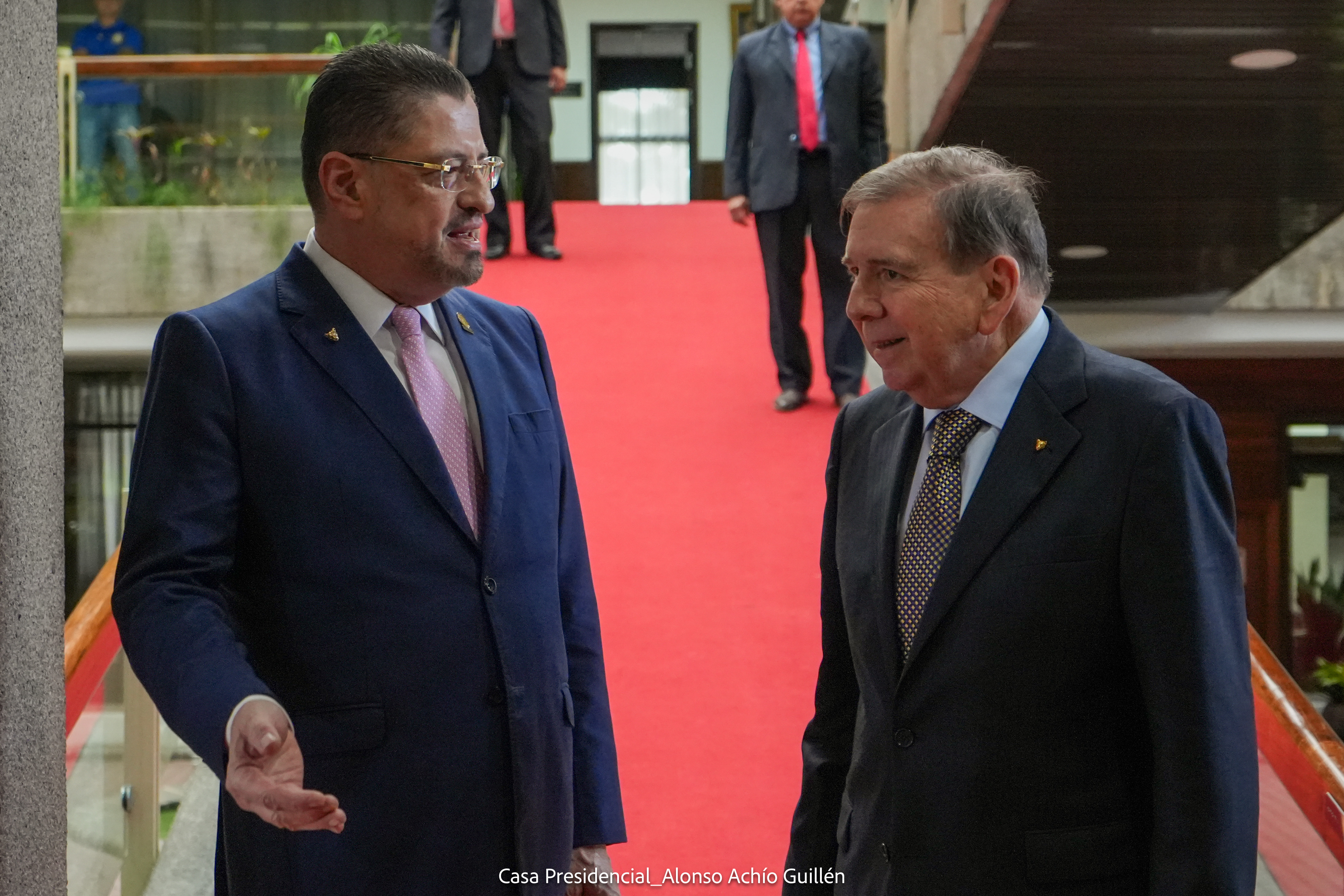
González (right) with President of Costa Rica Rodrigo Chaves Robles on 16 January 2025

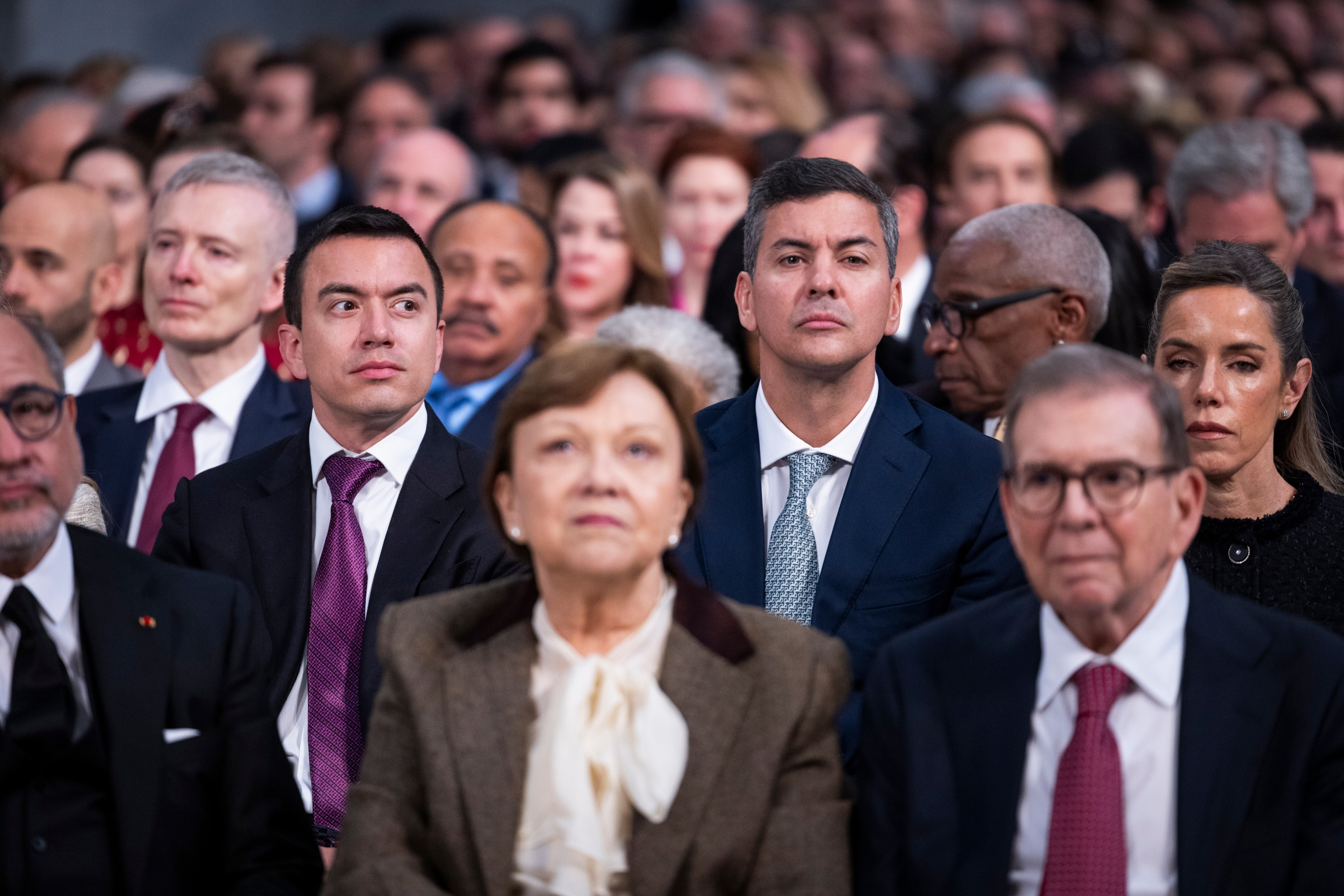
González (right) with his wife attending the 2025 Nobel Peace Prize ceremony in Oslo on 10 December 2025

An arrest warrant was issued on 2 September for González for the alleged crimes of "usurpation of functions, falsification of public documents, instigation to disobey the law, conspiracy and association". After the election, González sought refuge secretly in the Dutch Embassy through 5 September, after which he spent several days in the Spanish embassy in Caracas, and was granted asylum, leaving on a Spanish Armed Forces flight on 7 September 2024. His wife accompanied him on the flight to Madrid, where they were to join their younger daughter, Carolina, who had resided there for the previous ten years.

On 14 September 2024, the Legislative Assembly of Costa Rica, by a vote exceeding two-thirds, recognized González as president-elect and described Nicolás Maduro’s claims to victory as “fraudulent.” Two days later, the Colombian House of Representatives approved a resolution recognizing González, with 86 votes in favor and 24 against. On 24 September, the Colombian Senate approved a document by 48 votes to 6 urging President Gustavo Petro to publicly recognize what it described as the true winners of the Venezuelan presidential election, and recognizing González as the victor.

On 19 September 2024, the European Parliament recognised Venezuelan opposition leader González as the legitimate and democratically elected president of the country with a non-binding resolution. On 26 September 2024, a group of 49 countries, together with the European Union, signed a joint declaration at the United Nations calling for the “restoration of democratic norms in Venezuela” and expressing grave concern over reported human rights violations. Brazil, Colombia, Mexico, Russia, and China did not sign the declaration, nor did any African or Arab country except Morocco.

González, along with María Corina Machado, was awarded the Sakharov Prize on 24 October 2024 at the European Parliament. On 28 October, he traveled to Italy, where he met with Prime Minister Giorgia Meloni, who reaffirmed her support for a democratic transition in Venezuela. On the same day, the National Assembly of Panama passed a resolution recognizing González as president-elect.

On 9 December 2024, in an interview with the Spanish newspaper El País, González announced that he planned to appoint opposition leader María Corina Machado as Executive Vice President in his proposed government. González reiterated his intention to return to Caracas to be sworn in on 10 January 2025 in accordance with the Constitution, stating that his aim was to assume office and subsequently make key decisions, including forming his government team.

On 19 December 2024, former Colombian president Andrés Pastrana reiterated his support for González in a post on X and called on democratic leaders in the region to accompany him at his planned inauguration in Caracas on 10 January. On the same day, Antonio Marval Jiménez, president of the Supreme Tribunal of Justice in exile since 2019, stated in a video interview that he was prepared to travel to Venezuela to swear in González if the National Assembly was unable or unwilling to do so, citing constitutional authority.

On 4 January 2025, González began an official tour of Latin America to seek diplomatic support for his inauguration. He was received by Argentine president Javier Milei and by Uruguayan president Luis Lacalle Pou.

On 8 January 2025, while in Panama, González met president José Raúl Mulino and delivered copies of electoral records from the 28 July election, which he and the opposition claim demonstrate his victory. According to María Corina Machado, the documents were placed in custody at the National Bank of Panama. On 10 January, Machado stated that González had decided to postpone plans to return to Venezuela due to security concerns, including alleged threats to his aircraft. During this period, Venezuelan authorities imposed severe restrictions on air traffic and closed major highways and border crossings with Colombia and Brazil until 13 January. He ultimately could not enter Venezuela, and the third inauguration of Nicolás Maduro was celebrated by the PSUV-controlled government.

On 16 January 2025, Costa Rican President Rodrigo Chaves hosted González in San José and reiterated his recognition of him as the winner of the 2024 presidential election. Two days later, on 18 January 2025, González met in Costa Rica with Nancy Hernández López, president of the Inter-American Commission on Human Rights, to discuss the human rights situation in Venezuela.

On 20 January 2025, González attended the second inauguration of U.S. president Donald Trump in Washington, D.C. On 29 January, he was received in Ecuador by President Daniel Noboa, who awarded him the National Order of Merit (Grand Collar) and expressed support for efforts to restore democracy in Venezuela. The following day, González met with Peruvian president Dina Boluarte at the Government Palace in Lima, where he was decorated by Congress with the Order of the Sun of Peru (Grand Cross). He was also presented with the keys to the city of Lima by Mayor Rafael López Aliaga.

On 31 January 2025, González and María Corina Machado held a virtual meeting with Israeli Foreign Minister Gideon Sa’ar. Sa’ar conveyed support from the Israeli government, extended congratulations on González’s reported electoral victory, and expressed hope that he would soon be able to return to Venezuela as president. González and Machado both expressed appreciation for the communication with the Israeli government.

On 25 October 2025, then president-elect of Bolivia Rodrigo Paz held a video call with Machado in the context of his successful presidential campaign. Paz stated his desire for Machado to attend his upcoming inauguration if possible, and expressed his government's support for Venezuela’s democratic transition and regional cooperation, as well as a shared commitment to democratic governance.

After Nicolás Maduro was detained by US forces on 3 January 2026 as part of a military operation, opposition leader María Corina Machado called for González to assume the presidency. González responded on social media that he was “ready to rebuild our nation” and described the subsequent hours as “decisive” for Venezuela’s future. He later wrote that Maduro's capture represented an important step but was “not enough,” and emphasized that the country’s “normalization” depended on the release of all political prisoners and respect for the “majority will expressed by the people” in the 2024 election.

On 9 January 2026, from exile, González delivered a recorded message in which he welcomed the recent release of political detainees and called for “temperance and firmness” in protecting families amid ongoing political developments. Later that day, he announced that he had held a telephone conversation with Spanish Prime Minister Pedro Sánchez, who had publicly questioned the U.S. operation three days earlier. During the call, González reiterated that a “real transition” would require the verified, full, and unconditional release of all political prisoners, as well as respect for the results of the election.

=== International trips ===
Date	Location	Main purpose
2024
8 September 2024	Madrid, Spain	Exile. Meeting with Prime Minister Pedro Sánchez at the Palace of Moncloa, seat of the Spanish government.
10 October 2024	Lisbon, Portugal	Meeting with Prime Minister Luís Montenegro and Foreign Minister Paulo Rangel at the Necessidades Palace, headquarters of the Ministry of Foreign Affairs.
14 October 2024	Barcelona, Spain	Participation in World in Progress Barcelona.
28 October 2024	Rome, Italy	Meeting with Prime Minister Giorgia Meloni at the Palazzo Chigi and with Foreign Minister Antonio Tajani.
11 November 2024	Berlin, Germany	Meeting with Minister of State Tobias Lindner.
13 November 2024	Brussels, Belgium	Meeting with the High Representative of the Union for Foreign Affairs and Security Policy of the European Union, Josep Borrell, and with the European Parliament.
15 November 2024	The Hague, Netherlands	Meeting with Deputy Foreign Minister Marcel de Vink.
2025
4 January 2025	Montevideo, Uruguay	Meeting with President Luis Lacalle Pou.
6 January 2025	Washington, D.C., United States	Meeting with President Joe Biden at the White House.
8 January 2025	Panama City, Panama	Meeting with President José Raúl Mulino.
8 January 2025	Santo Domingo, Dominican Republic	
14 January 2025	Guatemala City, Guatemala	Meeting with President Bernardo Arévalo.
16 January 2025	San José, Costa Rica	Meeting with President Rodrigo Chaves.
20 January 2025	Washington, D.C., United States	Second inauguration of Donald Trump
28 January 2025	Quito, Ecuador	Meeting with President Daniel Noboa at the Carondelet Palace.
29 January 2025	Lima, Peru	Meeting with President Dina Boluarte at the Government Palace.

== Political views ==
González has been described as a centrist.

=== Attitude towards Maduro ===
González was apolitical during his diplomatic service, working for both Hugo Chávez and Carlos Andrés Pérez. Although González worked against the Chávez–Maduro administrations, his attitude has been described as conciliatory. While former presidential candidate María Corina Machado supported prosecution of the human rights abuses of the Maduro government, González has repeatedly supported talks with Maduro.

== Personal life ==
Since 1973, González has been married to the dentist Mercedes Marina López Unzueta (1949), with whom he has two daughters: Mariana del Carmen González López, born on 16 July 1976, and Carolina González López, born on 4 January 1980, in Washington, D.C., and has four grandchildren.
