= María Corina Machado =

Venezuelan politician and activist (born 1967)

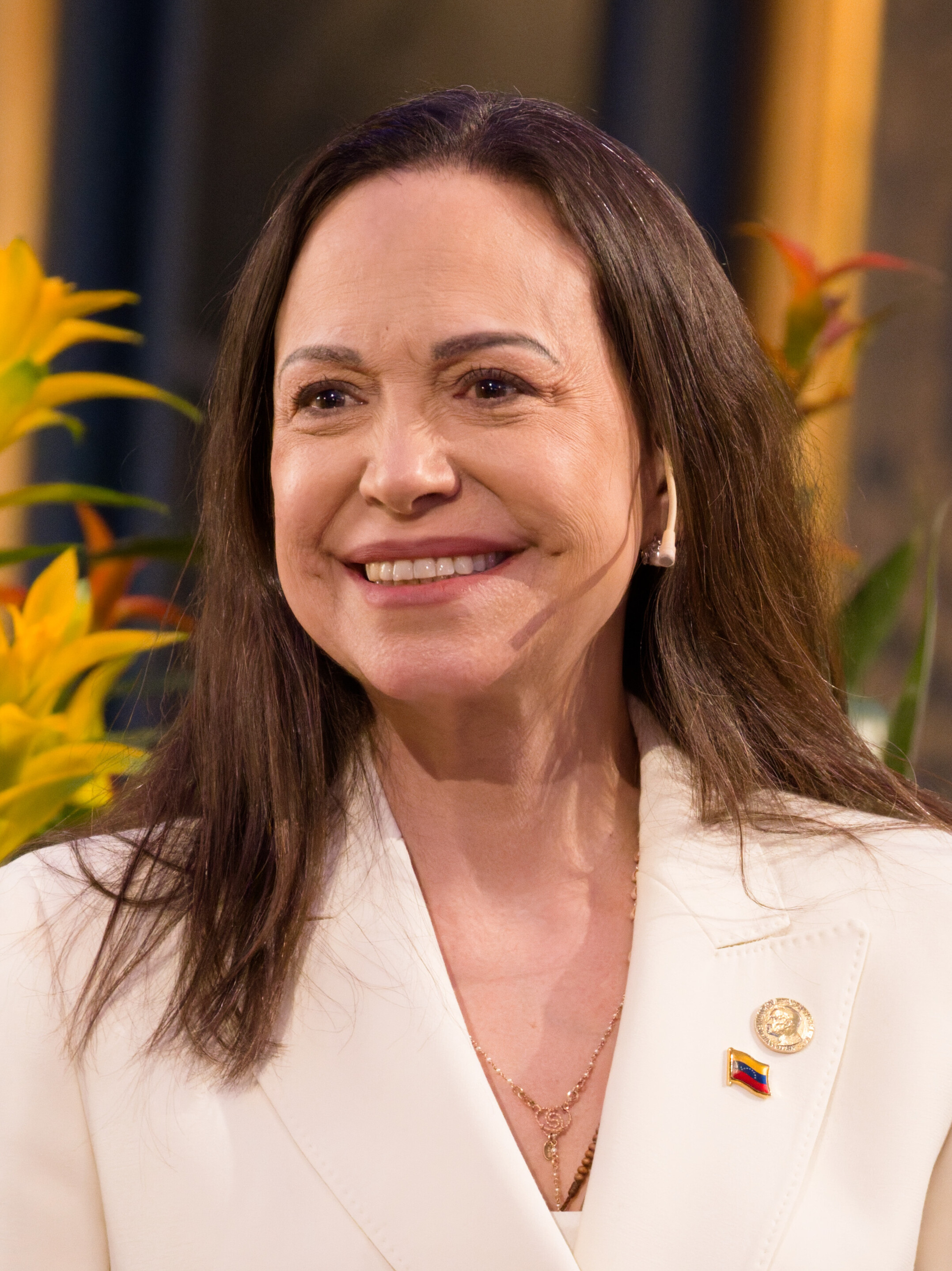
- Machado in 2025

Member of the National Assembly for Miranda
- In office 5 January 2011 – 21 March 2014
- Preceded by: Hiram Gaviria
- Succeeded by: Ricardo Sánchez

Leader of Vente Venezuela
- Incumbent
- Assumed office 24 May 2012

Personal details
- Born: María Corina Machado Parisca; 7 October 1967 (age 59) Caracas, Republic of Venezuela
- Party: Vente Venezuela (since 2012)
- Other political affiliations: Unitary Platform; Democratic Unity Roundtable; Súmate (2001–2010)
- Children: 3
- Education: Andrés Bello Catholic University (BS); Institute of Advanced Studies of Administration (MS)
- Awards: Václav Havel Human Rights Prize (2024); Sakharov Prize (2024); Nobel Peace Prize (2025)
- Nickname: MCM

María Corina Machado Parisca (Note: Latin American Spanish pronunciation: [maˈɾia koˈɾina maˈtʃaðo paˈɾiska].) (born 7 October 1967), also known as MCM, is a Venezuelan politician, activist, and prominent leader of the opposition to the administrations of Hugo Chávez, Nicolás Maduro, and Delcy Rodríguez. She served as a member of the National Assembly of Venezuela from 2011 to 2014, and has run as a candidate in presidential elections. She was awarded the 2025 Nobel Peace Prize.

An industrial engineer with a master's degree in finance, Machado began her political career as a founder of the vote-monitoring organization Súmate. She is the National Coordinator of the political party Vente Venezuela and ran in the 2012 opposition presidential primary, which she lost to Henrique Capriles. During the 2014 Venezuelan protests, she played a leading role in organizing demonstrations against Maduro's government.

In 2023, Machado won the opposition primary for the 2024 presidential election. She was barred from running for being disqualified according to the Venezuela’s Supreme Tribunal of Justice. Edmundo González ultimately replaced her as the candidate. The election results were highly disputed, the opposition parties mobilized to collect vote tallies from voting machines which portrayed González as the winner of the election, although the Maduro government claimed victory instead. In the aftermath, Machado said she went into hiding, expressing fears for her life and freedom.

Aside from the Nobel Peace Prize, she was named one of BBC's 100 Women in 2018, and listed among Time magazine's 100 most influential people in 2025. In 2024, Machado received the Václav Havel Human Rights Prize and the Sakharov Prize (shared with González) for representing Venezuelans fighting for democracy.

== Early life and education ==
Machado was born in Caracas, Venezuela, on 7 October 1967. The eldest of four daughters, her mother Corina Parisca Pérez was a psychologist while her father Henrique Machado Zuloaga was a steel-industry businessman. She grew up in a conservative and Catholic family. Machado's great-great-grandfather was Eduardo Blanco, who wrote Venezuela Heroica in 1881. Her great-uncle Armando Zuloaga Blanco was killed in the 1929 failed uprising against the dictatorship of Juan Vicente Gómez.

With a degree in industrial engineering from Andrés Bello Catholic University and a master's degree in finance from Instituto de Estudios Superiores de Administración (IESA) in Caracas, Machado worked in the auto industry in Valencia. In 1992, she started Fundación Atenea (Atenea Foundation), a foundation using private donations to care for orphaned and delinquent Caracas street children; she also served as chair of the Oportunitas Foundation. She moved to Caracas in 1993. Because of her role in Súmate, Machado left the foundation so that it would not be politicized.

Machado was part of Yale University's Yale World Fellows program in 2009. She was also part of Young Global Leaders in 2005, and again in 2011.

== Súmate ==
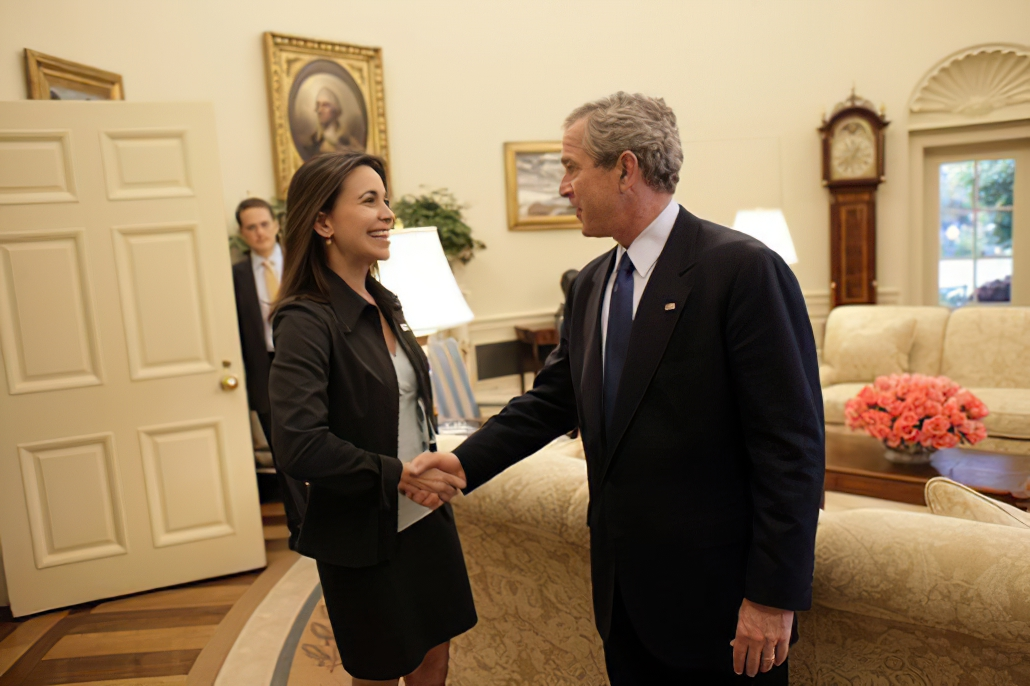
U.S. president George W. Bush welcomes Machado to the Oval Office on 31 May 2005.

The founding of the volunteer civil organization Súmate resulted from a hurried encounter between Machado and Alejandro Plaz in a hotel lobby in 2001, where they shared their concern about the course that was being shaped for Venezuela. Machado said: "Something clicked. I had this unsettling feeling that I could not stay at home and watch the country get polarized and collapse... We had to keep the electoral process but change the course, to give Venezuelans the chance to count ourselves, to dissipate tensions before they built up. It was a choice of ballots over bullets."

Súmate led a petition drive for the 2004 Venezuelan recall referendum. After the referendum results showed that electors had voted no to recalling President Hugo Chávez, members of Súmate including Machado were charged with treason and conspiracy, under Article 132 of the Penal Code, for receiving financial support for their activities from the U.S. National Endowment for Democracy (NED).

Human Rights Watch acknowledged that Machado, Planz and other members of Súmate received financial support from NED but labelled the criminal charges as dubious and politically motivated. Machado acknowledged the support of Venezuelans for Chávez, saying, "We have to recognize the positive things that have been done", but that the president is "increasingly intolerant".

Machado and Plaz were invited to meet with National Assembly legislators in August 2006 for an investigation about Súmate's funding but were denied access to the hearing, despite stating that they received two letters requesting their presence. She faced treason charges for signing the Carmona Decree during the 2002 Venezuelan coup attempt; she said she wrote her name on what she believed to be a sign-in sheet while she was visiting the presidential palace. The trial was suspended in February 2006 and was postponed indefinitely, making it effectively dismissed.

== 2011 presidential candidacy ==
In 2011, Machado launched her candidacy for the 2012 Venezuelan presidential election. The Los Angeles Times said that her name was raised as a potential candidate. According to the Financial Times, Machado was "dubbed the new face of the opposition ... Even President Hugo Chávez has spoken of confronting her in the 2012 presidential elections."

On 13 January 2012, during an eight-hour annual State of the Nation Speech by Chávez to the National Assembly, Machado confronted him about shortages of basic goods, crime, and nationalizations of industries. According to the Associated Press, she "boldly interrupted" Chavez's speech to accuse him of theft. El Estímulo reported that the "televised clash ... catapulted [her] into the public eye beyond the capital's borders", when she said to Chávez, "How can you talk about respecting the private sector in Venezuela when you've been dedicated to expropriation, which is stealing". According to El Pais, her family founded the national corporation Electricidad de Caracas, and the family steel companies (Sivensa and Sidetur) were "expropriated and destroyed by the Chavista administration"; Chávez "sent soldiers to take over seven of the company’s plants as part of his socialist nationalization program", according to the New York Times.

The winner of the 2012 primary to be the opposition candidate against Chávez in the October presidential election was Henrique Capriles Radonski; according to the Associated Press, Machado "conceded defeat before the results were announced, saying she also will actively back Capriles". Chávez had predicted Machado's defeat in their prior confrontation when he pointed out that she was trailing badly in polls for the opposition primary.

== National Assembly ==
=== Candidacy ===
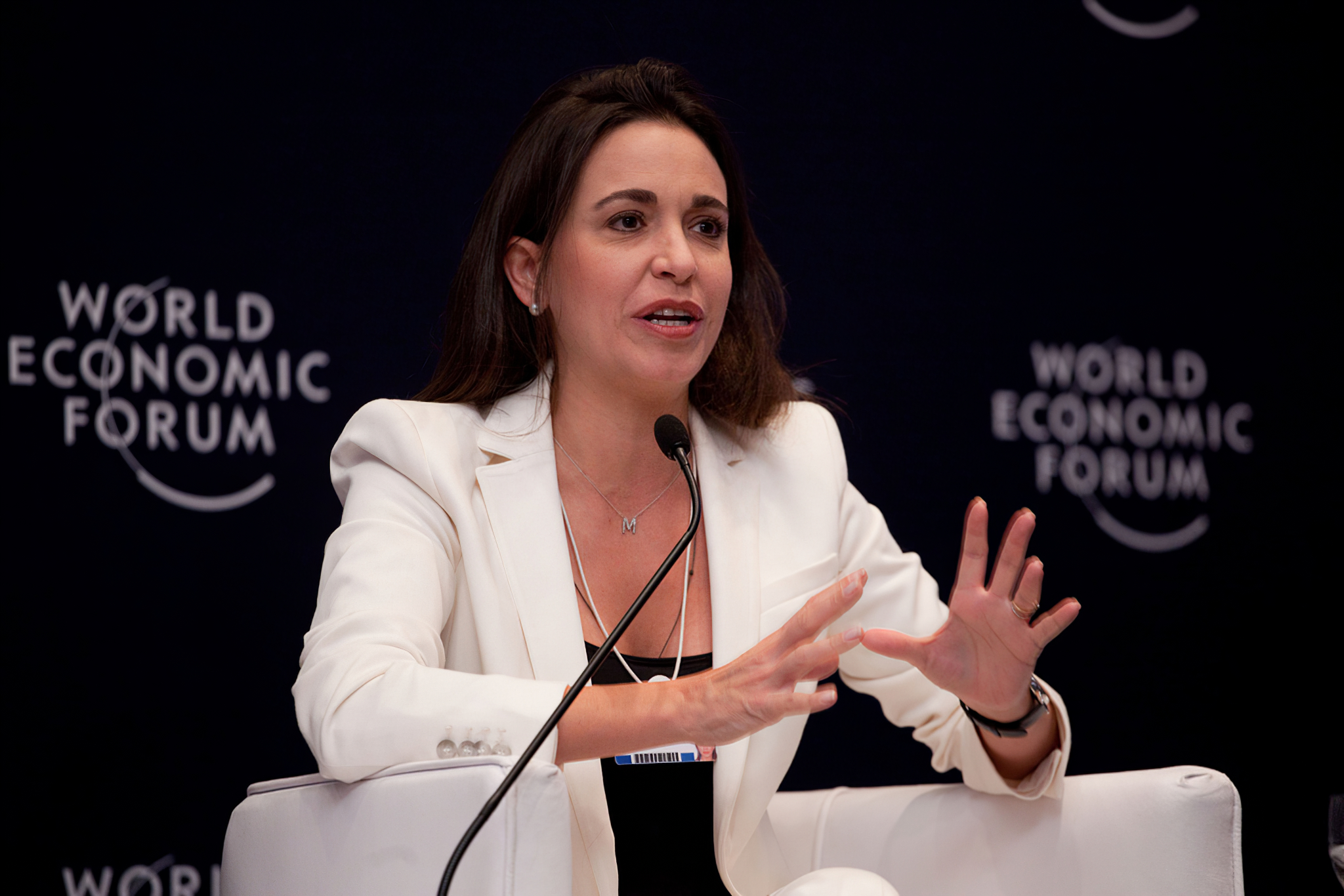
Machado at the 2011 World Economic Forum on Latin America in Rio de Janeiro, Brazil

In February 2010, Machado resigned from Súmate, and announced her candidacy for the National Assembly of Venezuela. She represented the state of Miranda for the municipalities of Chacao, Baruta, El Hatillo, and the Parroquia Leoncio Martínez de Sucre. In announcing her candidacy, she said Venezuelans were good, decent, and free people who do not want to live with violence or hate; she promised to defend the right for Venezuelans to think freely and live without fear. In April 2010, Machado won the primary election. She campaigned actively in "slums once viewed as solid pro-Chávez territory", attempting to "capitalize on domestic problems, including widespread violent crime, power outages in some regions, a severe housing shortage and 30-percent inflation".

Machado complained that MUD candidates faced "what she called a government-orchestrated propaganda machine that churns out spots ridiculing Chávez's critics, runs talk shows dominated by ruling party hopefuls and picks up all of the president's speeches", and that she had to campaign with less funds as she "struggled to convince supporters and business leaders to contribute to her campaign because they fear reprisals by the government and Chávez-friendly prosecutors". According to The Economist, Venezuela's constitution "prohibits government officials, including the president, from using their position to favour a political tendency. But the electoral authority, whose board comprises four chavistas and a lone oppositionist, says they can do it anyway."

Chávez was accused of breaking campaign laws by using state-run television to "berate rivals and praise friends" during the election campaign; he denied breaking the law, and suggested that the only director of the National Election Council's five directors who is not pro-Chávez and who raised the issue could be prosecuted for making the charges. According to a reporter for the Associated Press, Venezuela's electoral council "has for years ignored laws that bar the president and other elected officials from actively campaigning for candidates. Chavez ... has threatened legal action against Vicente Diaz, the lone member of the electoral council who has criticized his heavy use of state media ahead of the vote." Machado said: "While we are visiting voters, going from house to house, the ruling party's campaign is imposed through televised speeches." When the state-run television channel interviewed Machado, they ran images of her Oval Office meeting in 2005 with George W. Bush, described by an Associated Press reporter as "Chavez's longtime nemesis". She said: "We have a campaign led by the PSUV with a lot of resources that we know are public resources – even when the constitution prohibits it. The PSUV benefitted from frequent cadenas nacionales (Chávez speeches that every Venezuelan TV channel were mandated to run), while "the main government channel air[ed] a steady stream of rallies and ads featuring Chavez's red-clad candidates". When Machado was interviewed by the state-run channel, the interview was "abruptly cut off" and "shifted to a campaign rally where Chávez spoke to a theater filled with supporters".

=== Election ===
Machado won the election to the National Assembly on 25 September 2010, as the highest vote-getter in the nation; she and fellow Justice First Miranda candidate Enrique Mendoza were the "two highest vote-getters nationwide". Machado said the president "made a big mistake by turning the election into a plebiscite on himself... This is a clear signal that Venezuelans do not want an authoritarian government, a militarized government, a centralized government and a government that wants to turn Venezuela into Cuba... A new phase begins today, and we've taken a big step toward the day when democratic values, freedom, justice and good governance prevail." She added: "We now have the legitimacy of the citizen vote. We are the representatives of the people." She concluded: "It is very clear. Venezuela said no to Cuban-like communism."

=== Removal ===
On 21 March 2014, Machado appeared as an alternate envoy at the request of Panama at the Organization of American States (OAS), amid the protests in Venezuela, to speak about the situation in Venezuela. According to The Wall Street Journal, following her appearance at the OAS, "pro-Maduro parliamentarians, who dominate the National Assembly", alleged that her appearance at the OAS was prohibited by Venezuela's constitution, and removed her from the National Assembly. Machado responded by accusing Diosdado Cabello (president of the National Assembly) of having a "dictatorship in the National Assembly", and said that her removal from the National Assembly was illegal.

== 2014 protests and activism ==
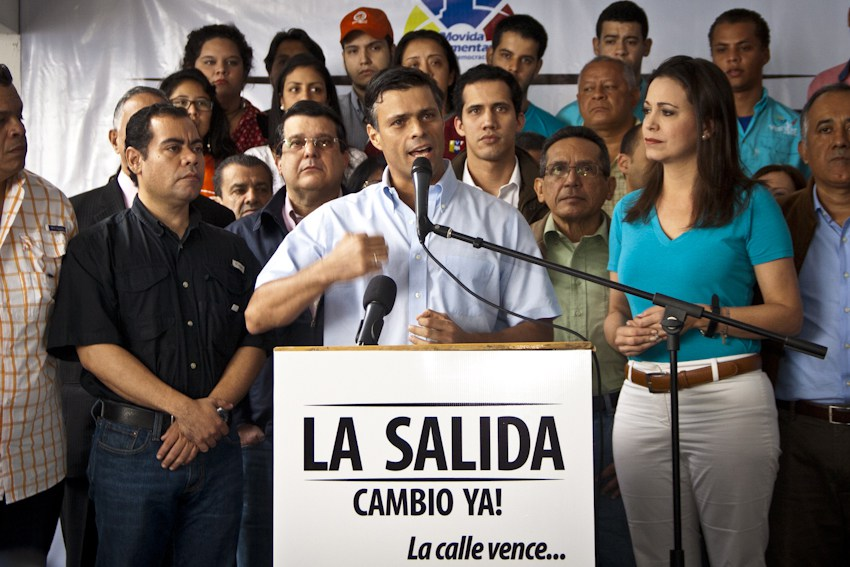
Leopoldo López and María Corina Machado, presenting the La Salida initiative. Juan Guaidó is behind.

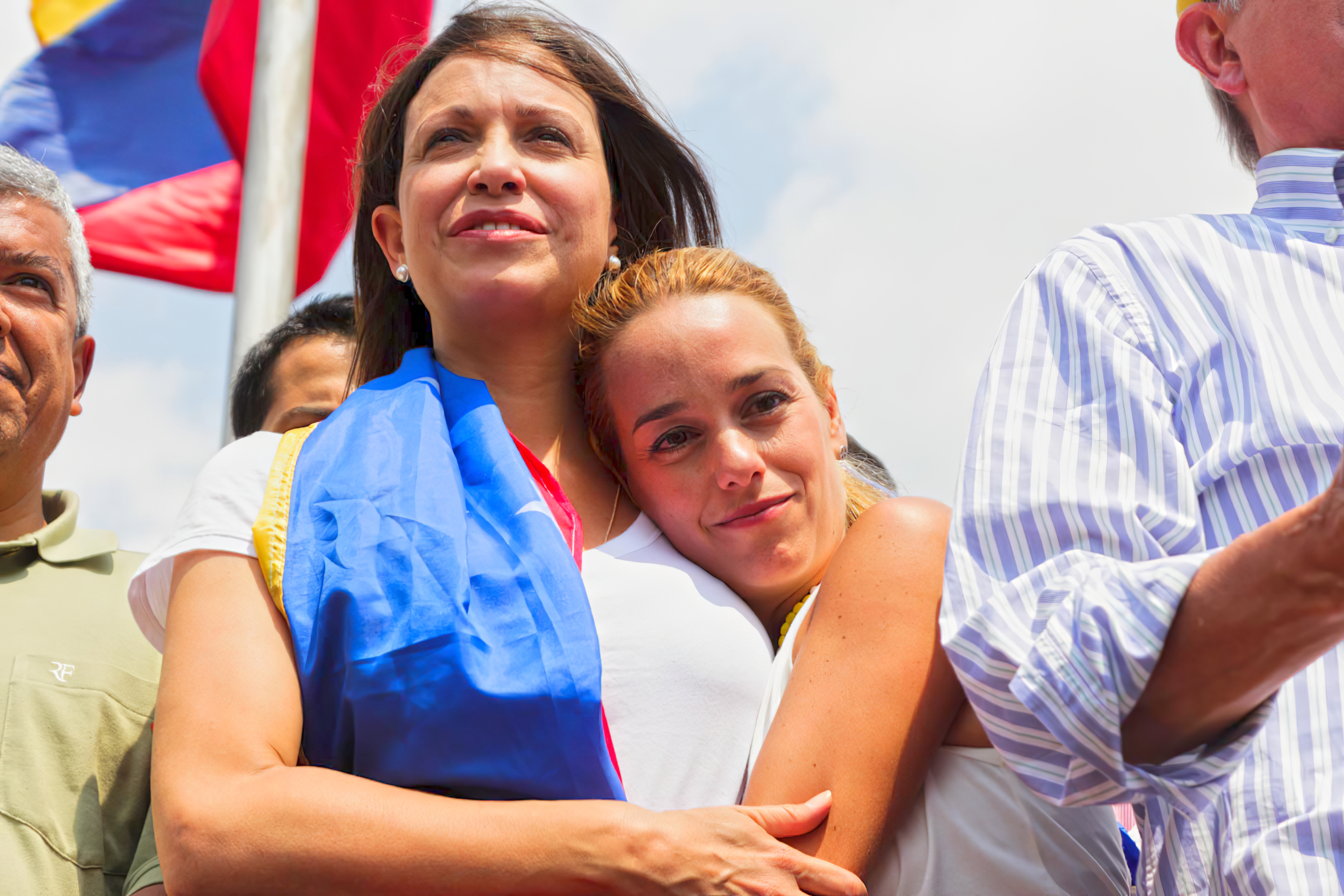
Machado with Lilian Tintori, wife of Leopoldo López, at an opposition gathering

Machado was among the leaders of the opposition demonstrations against Nicolás Maduro in the 2014 protests. The National Assembly requested a criminal investigation of Machado on 18 March 2014 for crimes including treason for her involvement in the anti-government protests. Machado responded to the accusations saying: "In a dictatorship, the weaker the regime is, the greater the repression." After her removal on 21 March 2014, Machado, along with supporters, began a march on 1 April 2014 toward downtown Caracas protesting against Machado's expulsion, where Machado attempted to return to her seat in the National Assembly. The National Guard confronted the protesters in the central square where they had gathered, blocking the group from proceeding towards the legislature and then dispersing them with tear gas.

In May 2014, government official Jorge Rodríguez presented allegations of a plot by opposition politicians and officials, including Machado, to overthrow Maduro's government. The evidence provided by the Venezuelan government were alleged emails through Google that were addressed to others from both Machado and Pedro Mario Burelli. Burelli responded that the emails were falsified by the Bolivarian Intelligence Service (SEBIN), showing what he said were the original emails. In June 2014, Attorney General Luisa Ortega Díaz subpoenaed Machado along with Burelli, Diego Arria, and Ricardo Koesling. By 11 June 2014, arrest warrants were issued. Burelli hired Kivu, a U.S.-based cybersecurity company, to analyze the alleged emails. Kivu concluded that there was "no evidence of the existence of any emails between Pedro Burelli's Google email accounts and the alleged recipients", that the alleged emails presented by the Venezuelan government had "many indications of user manipulation" and that "Venezuelan officials used forged emails to accuse government adversaries of plotting to kill President Nicolas Maduro".

In November 2014, government officials announced that Machado was to be formally charged on 3 December 2014. Machado and others stated that the accusations were false and were created by the government to deflect attention from the country's economic problems and polls showing Maduro's approval rating at a record low of 30%. Between 2014 and 2021, Machado worked as a broadcaster on the radio station Radio Caracas Radio, where she hosted a weekly hour-long talk show and political analysis program called Contigo: Con María Corina Machado.

== Later political career ==
On 1 February 2019, Machado announced she would run for president if Juan Guaidó were to call elections, owing to the 2019 Venezuelan presidential crisis. For the next Venezuelan presidential election, Machado was recognized as a front-running opposition candidate. In an interview discussing the election, Machado insisted that she was not interested in the opposition primary and said that "my goal is to get Maduro out and be able to defeat the regime using all the force". She argued: "There are only two options here ... We win with a huge majority or Maduro steals the election." According to head of the Delphos pollster Félix Seijas, "[t]he opposition as it existed is no longer, and that opens the door for her to capture support beyond her radical base", while explaining her expanded support. On 30 June 2023, she was disqualified from holding office for 15 years by the government due to her leadership in anti-government protests.

Following the escalation of government pressure against opposition figures, Machado was barred from holding public office and subjected to restrictions on her movement.

=== 2023 presidential primary elections ===
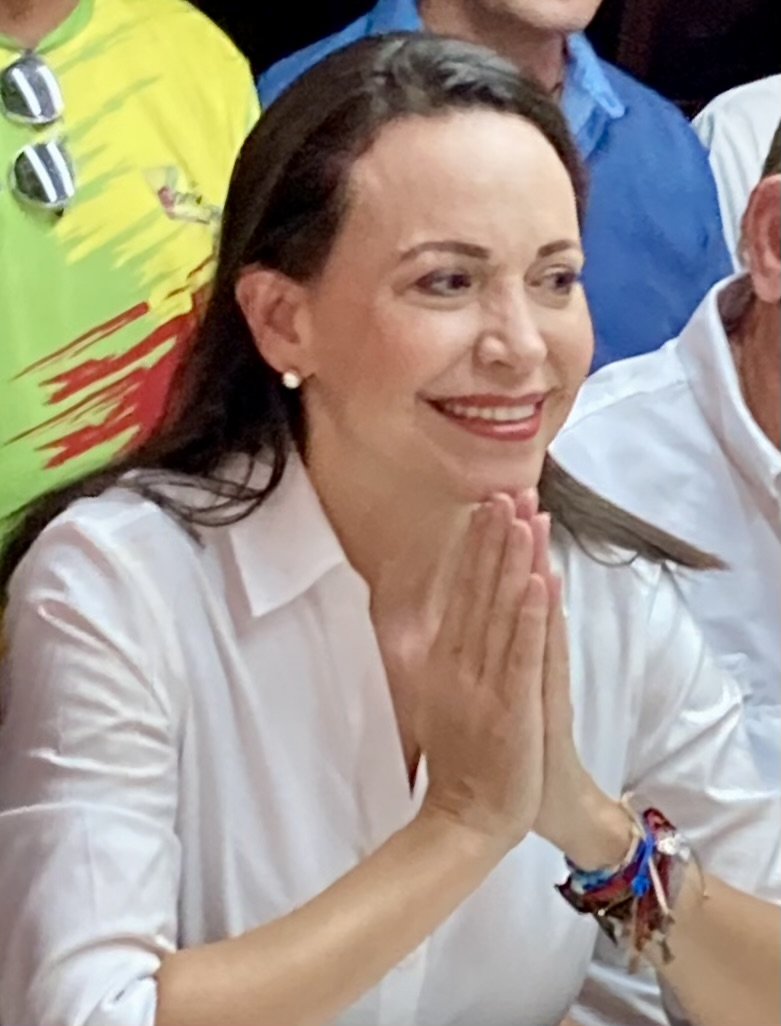
Machado in a 2023 press conference

On 14 August 2022, Machado confirmed her participation in the 2023 Unitary Platform presidential primaries. During the primaries, Machado positioned herself against the technical assistance of the National Electoral Council (CNE) in the election, alleging that CNE is part of a "criminal system". In the same way, she defended the return to manual voting. On 15 March 2023, she officially began her campaign tour of the country, in the state of Mérida. During her pre-campaign, Machado maintained criticism towards the traditional opposition leadership, mainly the Democratic Action, Justice First, A New Era, and Popular Will parties. She made it clear that she was willing to negotiate an exit from Chavismo to achieve a transition.

On 30 June 2023, Machado was disqualified for fifteen years by the comptroller general of Venezuela after a request from the politician José Brito. The comptroller linked her to alleged crimes by Juan Guaidó and accused her of supporting sanctions during the Venezuelan crisis. Analysts determined that the accusation of having participated in the interim was incoherent, taking into account that she was not a member of the 2015 opposition National Assembly (being prevented by a disqualification from the Comptroller's Office), in addition to never having been appointed in any position in Guaidó's interim government. The United Nations, the Organization of American States, the European Union and numerous countries condemned Machado's disqualification. The European Parliament called the ban "arbitrary and politically fabricated", and the Associated Press wrote that banning opposition politicians from elections was a frequent tactic used by the government.

On 26 October 2023, after winning the primary elections, the National Primary Commission proclaimed Machado as the unitary presidential candidate of the opposition. Machado's 15-year disqualification was confirmed by the Supreme Tribunal of Justice in January 2024. The court said the disqualification was "for being involved... in the corruption plot orchestrated by the usurper Juan Guaido", which had led to a "criminal blockade of the Bolivarian Republic of Venezuela, as well as the shameless dispossession of the companies and wealth of the Venezuelan people abroad, with the complicity of corrupt governments". Machado named Corina Yoris as her alternate. Yoris was unable to register as a candidate and Edmundo González Urrutia was chosen as her replacement.

=== 2024 presidential election ===
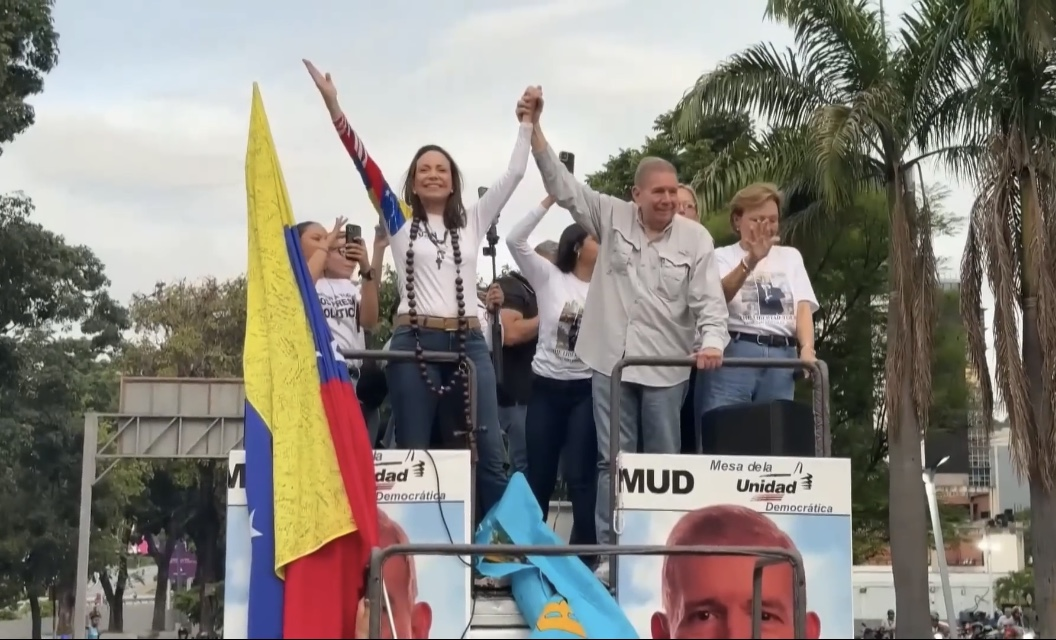
Machado with Edmundo González in 2024

Although Machado was not the presidential candidate in the 2024 Venezuelan presidential election, she remained the leader of the opposition to Chavismo during the electoral process. The majority support that candidate Edmundo González received in various polls was due to the boost given to him by Machado's support. Regarding the role that Machado would play in a González Urrutia government, The Telegraph commented: "Should the opposition win, Ms Machado is widely expected to be the de facto leader of a government formally led by Mr González." The newspaper compared the massive popular movement around Machado with the rise of Hugo Chávez to the presidency in 1998, in terms of the "fervor" it generated in citizens, in a context of both political crisis and systemic decadence.

On 4 July, Machado and González officially began the electoral campaign along with other opposition leaders. The event, which was planned to be a caravan from Chacaíto to El Marqués, became a march with the attendance of dozens of thousands of people. The New York Times described Machado as "an energetic former legislator whose central message is the promise of bringing Venezuelans home by restoring democracy and getting the economy going again".

Following the Venezuelan government's announcements of falsified election results, a national and international political crisis developed. On 1 August, Machado published a letter in The Wall Street Journal, stating that she had gone in to hiding "fearing for my life, my freedom, and that of my fellow countrymen from the dictatorship of Nicolás Maduro"; in the letter, she laid out the evidence she said she had from the vote tallies supporting the opposition win, and stated that Maduro had expelled witnesses from the polls, while the witnesses "protected the voter receipts with their lives throughout the night" of the elections. On 9 January 2025, government forces attempted to arrest Machado after a rally in Chacao, Caracas, where she had reappeared publicly after three months in hiding. According to reports, government troops "violently intercepted" her vehicle and shot at the motorcycles carrying her.

After Nicolás Maduro was detained by US forces on 3 January 2026, opposition leader Machado called for Edmundo González, whom the opposition claim had won the 2024 presidential election, to assume the presidency, to which he responded that he was "ready to rebuild our nation" and that the coming hours would be "decisive".

=== After 2026 United States intervention in Venezuela ===
Following the United States capture of Nicolás Maduro and Vice President Delcy Rodríguez assuming the interim presidency, several U.S. lawmakers have called for the Venezuelan opposition party to take power with Machado at the helm. U.S. president Donald Trump has been dismissive of Machado, while U.S. secretary of state Marco Rubio spoke favorably of her, but stated that, with the majority of Venezuela's opposition leaders currently absent from the country, it was too early for such a transition. Two people close to the White House said the president’s motive for dismissing her is due to her decision to accept the Nobel Peace Prize, an award Trump has openly campaigned for. On 12 January, Machado held an unscheduled meeting with Pope Leo XIV at Vatican City. According to a statement shared on Twitter by her party, Vente Venezuela, the discussion focused on seeking the pope’s assistance in advocating for the release of all political prisoners in Venezuela. Machado also met with Cardinal Secretary of State Pietro Parolin.

On January 15, 2026, Machado met privately with Trump and later with multiple U.S. senators. Machado has plans to go back to Venezuela as soon as possible. She said that "This has nothing to do with tension or relations between Delcy Rodriguez and myself," and discussed that the "criminal structure" that has dominated Venezuela for years would eventually dismantle itself. A week later, Trump said he was considering involving Machado in his plans on Venezuela in some way, without specifying which role she would play.

On 20 January 2026, she was received at the headquarters of the Organization of American States (OAS) to meet with general secretary Albert Ramdin. The OAS held a meeting to discuss the situation of the political prisoners in Venezuela.

On 22 January 2026, Machado met with Iranian opposition figure Reza Pahlavi, the son of Mohammad Reza Pahlavi, the last shah of Iran, who is exiled in the United States, in the context of the 2026 Iranian protests. They discussed a shared objective: "the freedom of Venezuela and Iran." She also denounced the ties between the chavista government in Venezuela and Iranian supreme leader Ali Khamenei.

On 26 January, after a hearing on Venezuela on the US Senate, US secretary of state Marco Rubio met with Machado. She later said to reporters that a change in Venezuela was coming.

In an interview of NBC, Delcy Rodríguez said about Machado that “She will have to answer to Venezuela why she called upon a military intervention, why she called upon sanctions to Venezuela, and why she celebrated the actions that took place at the beginning of January.”

At Machado's request, she met for a second time with Donald Trump in the White House on 6 March to review plans for her trip to come back to Venezuela.

In March 2026, Machado travelled to Chile for the inauguration of Chilean president José Antonio Kast and to meet other political leaders including King Felipe VI of Spain. Machado initiated a demonstration in Santiago of over 17000 people. She called for political change in Venezuela and promised to work toward conditions that would allow migrants to return home safely. Machado said her own return to Venezuela will occur later in coordination with allies.

Machado has attempted to return to her home country, Venezuela, at least seven times; three of those endeavors were in the same day, September 21, 2026. These attempts have included airplane flights through Aruba and Curaçao, and maritime transportation through the Panama Canal. In all of these cases, the companies responsible for coordinating the travels affirmed to lack the authorization to proceed with the trip. She states that the government led by Delcy Rodríguez, is blocking her travel to Venezuela. Officials from the United States government said it was not the right time for Machado to be in Venezuela.

While she repeatedly failed to arrive in her country of birth, the second Donald Trump administration negotiated an agreement with the administration of Delcy Rodríguez that would allow North American Blue Energy Partners to control 65 billion oil barrels from Venezuela. This volume corresponds to about 21% of the selected country's proven reserves. This company's Chief Executive Officer and major stockholder is Alejandro Betancourt, who is under investigation for money laundering in several Western European countries. Indeed, the corresponding governments arrested him in the United Kingdom for embezzlement against PDVSA, the main Venezuelan state-owned enterprise in the petroleum industry. María Corina Machado stated that the deal misses essential details, refuses to bring judicial guarantees to most companies, and fails to help Venezuelans benefit from the resources extracted.

On October 25, 2026, Machado announced that she has returned to Venezuela after more than 10 months.

== Political views ==
Machado is anti-Chavismo, saying she would "bury socialism forever". She has disagreed with the more politically moderate sections of the Venezuelan opposition who believed in change through the ballot box and criticized the interim government of Juan Guaidó. She has supported the international sanctions during the Venezuelan crisis, and has advocated for foreign intervention to remove Maduro on humanitarian grounds, believing that Maduro could not be removed democratically. Despite this, she took part in the 2023 opposition primaries, which she won. When the opposition was divided, yet saying a move to the left was the way to defeat Chávez and Maduro, Machado disagreed; according to The Wall Street Journal, she gained a reputation as a fighter in taking her message to the poor in the barrios that Chavismo governments "had made their lives worse, with crime soaring, the economy tanking and their children facing a bleak future". She called Maduro a narco-dictator and said she wanted him to be alive so that she could send him to jail when elected in his place. In 2025, The Wall Street Journal said she was a conservative activist for democracy who "often advocat[ed] for Washington to confront the Venezuelan government more forcefully".

In November 2005, in the context of an already "highly polarized country", The New York Times described Machado "as perhaps the most divisive figure after Mr. Chávez, a woman who is either beloved or reviled"; in 2025, they wrote that she had "corralled the fractious opposition". The Christian Science Monitor wrote in 2024 that she had become a "spiritual icon" in "contrast to the many years she was viewed as a radical, far-right politician, too extreme even for her own party coalition". The Nobel Prize Committee described her as "a key, unifying figure in a political opposition that was once deeply divided".

As the leader of Vente Venezuela, in July 2018, Machado articulated that "being rich is good" in the context of the wealth of a nation and policies to promote individual freedom, education, respect for the law, and open markets. She stated: "I want to promote a country of ... prosperous and independent citizens ... leav[ing] behind poverty ... A rich country values life and the environment, cares for its children, the elderly, and the sick ... Being rich is, without a doubt, very good." By May 2023, Machado described her government proposal as centrist and liberal, a description also used by United Press International in 2025. In February 2023, El País described Machado as being part of the "most radical wing of the right", whose views on social media are defended by the national right "MAGAzuelans", sometimes described as the expression of "the Venezuelan far right". Also in February 2023, Bloomberg News described her as "a conservative firebrand". In June 2023, El País described her as radical in the sense of believing only military intervention could remove Maduro, and as coming from the most radical wing of the political right and the Venezuelan opposition, and Peru's La República described her as having "professed an anti-Chavista speech and maintained an extreme right-wing stance". In July 2023, the Associated Press described Machado as "a conservative, free-market firebrand seen as radical even among the right-leaning opposition for her unwillingness to negotiate with the Maduro government". In March 2024, historian Steve Ellner described Machado as a "radical right-winger". The Christian Science Monitor, describing Machado's transition from "political fringe to center stage" in 2024, said: "What once seemed radical–she was one of the first to call chavismo a dictatorship and referred to the government's expropriation of private land and businesses as 'theft'—now has Venezuelans clamoring with approval."

=== Domestic policy ===
In 2011, Machado campaigned as an advocate of "popular capitalism", stating: "To defeat Chavista socialism, we must present superior ideas that can inspire millions of Venezuelans." Machado supports the privatization of state-run entities in Venezuela, including oil company PDVSA. In 2023, she ran as a candidate in the opposition presidential primaries. The Maduro administration subsequently barred her from running. She became the main driving force for the main opposition candidate, Edmundo González Urrutia, who was allowed to compete by the Maduro government. In May 2023, Machado called for the banning of reelection to political office, said she was in favor of same-sex marriage, supported the legalization of medical cannabis, and called for a national debate on the legality of abortion in cases involving risk to the mother's life or instances of rape. In a 2024 interview, Machado talked of making education available for all Venezuelans and of reforming the country's judiciary. Machado has stated she admires, and has been compared to, the United Kingdom's Margaret Thatcher. In 2025, appearing virtually at the 2025 edition of Fortune Global Forum, she advocated large-scale privatization in Venezuela, arguing that more than 500 companies could be privatized, representing an estimated $1.7 trillion economic opportunity.

=== Foreign policy ===
Openly anti-communist, Machado is a signatory of the 2020 Madrid Charter. In February 2025, Machado addressed a Patriots for Europe rally in Madrid. Machado called Javier Milei's victory in the 2023 Argentine presidential election a triumph in the fight for "change" and "freedom" in Latin America, and said that their political projects shared a common thread in the "fundamental role of freedom" professed by Milei. Machado is also a supporter of U.S. president Donald Trump, whom she described in 2025 as a "visionary" in relation to his opposition to the Maduro government in Venezuela. Criticism of Machado has come from some Venezuelans who say she has not spoken forcefully against the deportation of Venezuelans under the second Trump administration.

After she won the 2025 Nobel Peace Prize, Machado stated that Trump "certainly deserves" to win the 2026 award as "in only nine months, so many conflicts have been solved or prevented". After he deployed the Navy to the Caribbean in 2025, Machado praised the Trump administration. One of her advisors told The New York Times that she has coordinated with the Trump administration and that she has a plan for the first hundred hours after Maduro is deposed. Mishal Husain asked Machado in October 2025 about Trump's statements about potential land strikes on Venezuelan targets; Machado replied that she believes "that the increase in pressure and the escalation that's taking place is the only way to force Maduro to understand that it's time to go" and for those supporting him to recognize that "this is the last change to facilitate a peaceful and orderly transition". According to The Hill, she "[places] blame for deaths from U.S. airstrikes squarely on the shoulders of ... Maduro". She stated: "We asked for years, [for the] international community to cut the sources that come from drug trafficking and other criminal activities ... Finally, this is happening." She added, "He [Maduro], and the rest of the drug cartels in power in Venezuela, should stop these activities in order to prevent more deaths."

Regarding the Israel–Palestine conflict, Machado expressed her solidarity with Israel following the 7 October attacks. She thanked Israel for its support of Edmundo González as president-elect, and previously of Guaidó as acting president. Machado planned to reestablish diplomatic relations with Israel, which were cut by President Chávez in 2009 during the 2008–2009 Gaza war. On a 17 October 2025 post on Twitter, she said she called the prime minister Benjamin Netanyahu to offer thanks "for his warm congratulations to the people of Venezuela on our 2025 Nobel Peace Prize" and express support for Israel. Israel's Prime Minister's Office said that Machado appreciated the ceasefire agreement that secured the release of Israeli hostages and supported Israel's efforts against Iran, which she called a threat to both countries. The Prime Minister's Office also said that Machado generally supported Israel's actions and decisions during the Gaza war and the related Gaza offensive. In another post on X, she wrote that Venezuelans knew that achieving peace "requires immense courage, strength, and moral clarity to stand against the totalitarian forces that oppose us". Although Machado avoided mentioning Israel and Gaza, Israel presented her post as an endorsement of its Gaza offensive due to her calling out "the Iranian regime" as "a key supporter of the Maduro regime", which she said also "backs terrorist organizations like Hamas, Hezbollah, and the Houthis".

== Target of violence ==
According to The New York Times, Machado's supporters see her as "courageous for staying in Venezuela when many other politicians have fled". While attending the bicentennial celebration of Venezuela's Declaration of Independence on 5 July 2011, following controversial comments she had made earlier about Venezuela's dependence on Cuba and not being independent, Machado was attacked by protesters. The group of about 50 threw stones and bottles at her; authorities defended her, and one officer was injured, as Machado was evacuated from the area by a police motorbike. Machado later thanked the authorities for defending her and apologized for any of their injuries.

During Machado's presidential race in 2011, she and her companions were attacked on 16 October by a small group of the Motorized Front of the PSUV while in Turmero, injuring Machado and two others. The group attacked them with kicks, punches and objects while chanting "this is chavista territory and no opposition politician can come in". In the 30 April 2013 National Assembly fight, cameras covering the National Assembly were turned to the ceiling and opposition members stated they were attacked and assaulted in an "ambush by supporters of President Nicolás Maduro's government". Machado was injured, along with other legislators in the National Assembly, saying she was attacked from behind, hit in the face and kicked while on the floor which left her with a broken nose. Machado said the brawl was "a premeditated, cowardly, vile, aggression". Maduro responded to the situation by saying: "What happened today in the National Assembly, we do not agree with violence. They tell us and we knew that the opposition was coming to provoke violence, and there was a strong exchange of blows, very strong. This must not repeat itself." No disciplinary actions was taken against any of the attackers after the incident.

At a rally on 16 November 2013 in support of the opposition party during municipal elections, Machado and other politicians were attacked by protesters, with stones and fireworks. After leading protests in Bolívar State on 14 March 2014, Machado, Bishop of Ciudad Guayana Mariano Parra, and other citizens in the area were attacked at the Puerto Ordaz airport. The National Guard intervened to disperse the attack. While heading to a meeting in Caricuao on 30 July 2014, members of colectivos attacked Machado. The vehicle Machado was traveling in was heavily damaged, with the body and windows of the vehicle being struck with gun handles, sticks, and stones. Machado escaped and was then moved to the assembly place while colectivos followed breaking down the door where they then left the scene after confrontations with residents protecting Machado.

== Awards and recognition ==
Machado in a forum with Center for Strategic and International Studies

In May 2005, US President George W. Bush welcomed Machado to the Oval Office. After meeting with Machado and discussing Súmate's "efforts to safeguard the integrity and transparency of Venezuela's electoral process", a White House spokesperson said, "[t]he President expressed his concerns about efforts to harass and intimidate Súmate and its leadership". Machado was hailed by National Review in 2006 as "the best of womankind and the difficult times many women face around the globe" on a list of Women the World Should Know for International Women's Day.

In 2009, Machado was chosen out of 900 applicants as one of 15 accepted to the Yale World Fellows Program. The Yale University program "aim[s] to build a global network of emerging leaders and to broaden international understanding worldwide". The Yale World Fellows Program press release said: "Machado devotes herself to defending democratic institutions and civil liberties through SUMATE, the nation's leading watchdog for electoral transparency." Machado later graduated from the program. Machado, Leopoldo López, and Antonio Ledezma were awarded the Cádiz Cortes Ibero-American Freedom Prize in 2015 for their "unwavering defense of freedom in their community and demands for the minimum exercise of human rights therein, which has led to their public rebuke by the government, including arbitrary imprisonment and the curtailing of their basic civil rights".

In 2018, Machado was named one of the BBC's 100 Most Influential Women. In 2019, Machado received the Prize for Freedom from Liberal International. Machado was awarded the 2024 Václav Havel Human Rights Prize by the Council of Europe. She was one of three finalists along with Akif Gurbanov and Babutsa Pataraia. Along with Edmundo González, she was awarded the Sakharov Prize by the European Parliament on 24 October 2024 for "representing the people of Venezuela fighting to restore freedom and democracy." In April 2025, Machado was listed among Time magazine's 100 most influential people, with U.S. Secretary of State Marco Rubio noting her "personification of resilience, tenacity, and patriotism".

In 2026, Mayor Mario Desbordes granted Machado with the keys to the city of Santiago, Chile.

=== Nobel Peace Prize ===
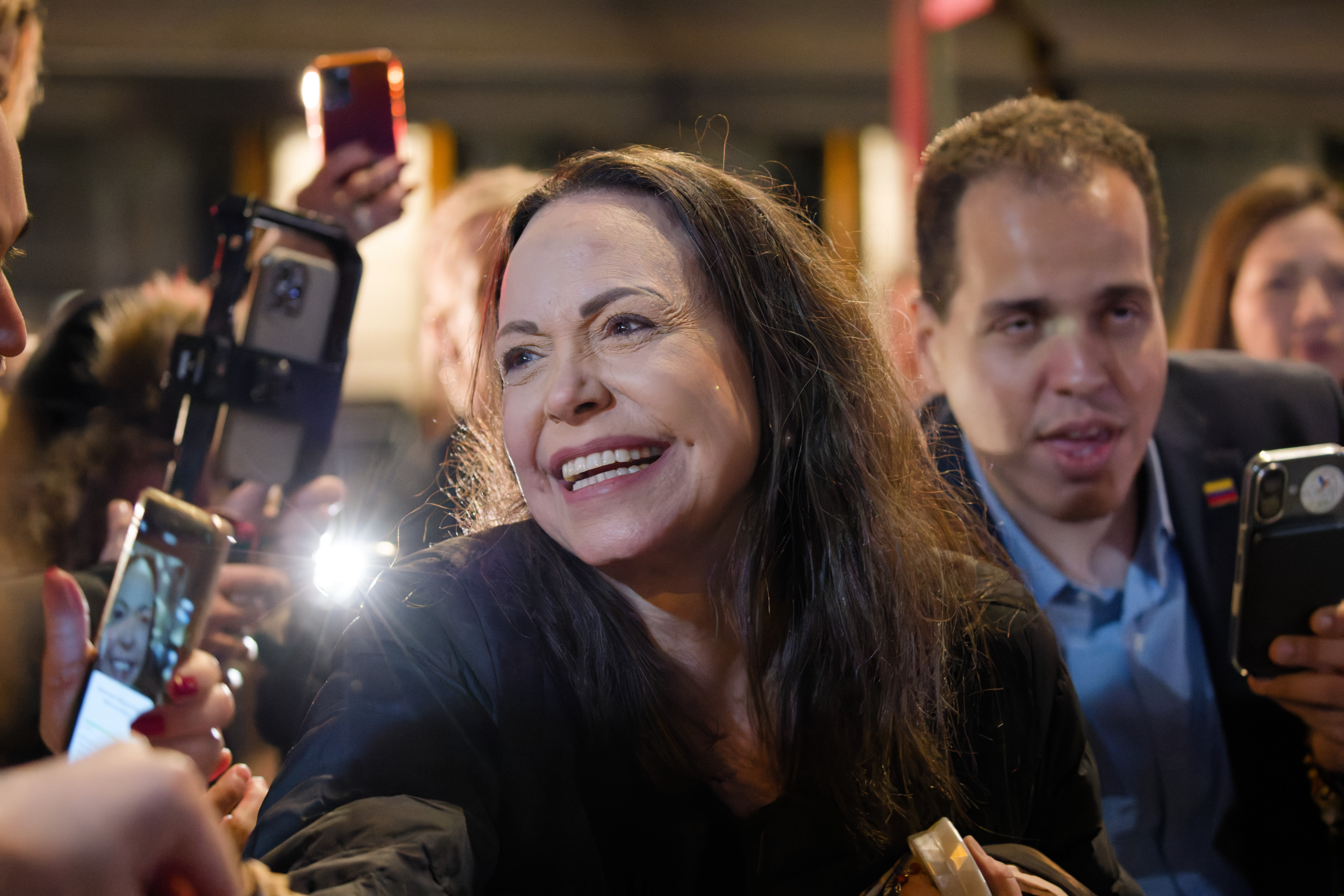
Machado greeting a crowd during Nobel Week 2025 in Oslo

The Inspira América Foundation, headed by Marcell Felipe, joined with the rectors of four U.S. universities on 16 August 2024 to promote the nomination of Machado for the Nobel Peace Prize, highlighting her "tireless fight for peace in Venezuela and the world" as "a fair recognition of a person who has dedicated almost her entire life to the fight for peace and the liberation" of Venezuela. On 26 August 2025, U.S. Secretary of State Marco Rubio, Senator Rick Scott and members of Congress Mario Díaz-Balart and María Elvira Salazar supported her nomination.

On 10 October, Machado was awarded the 2025 Nobel Peace Prize "for her tireless work promoting democratic rights for the people of Venezuela and for her struggle to achieve a just and peaceful transition from dictatorship to democracy". On X, Machado dedicated the prize to the "suffering people of Venezuela" and "President Trump for his decisive support of our cause."

==== Departure from Venezuela and award ceremony ====
Machado was prohibited from leaving Venezuela by a decade-old government-imposed travel ban and, by late 2025, had spent months in hiding amid the risk of arrest.

Bound for the Nobel Prize award ceremony in Oslo, Norway, Machado left Venezuela in December 2025 through irregular routes in a covert operation. International media reported various versions of how she departed, altering her appearance and avoiding security checkpoints. Machado reportedly undertook a dangerous sea crossing to the Dutch island of Curaçao, a route frequently used by Venezuelan political exiles. According to The Wall Street Journal account, the extraction operation involved a covert overland transfer to Venezuela's Caribbean coast followed by a maritime crossing that was disrupted by mechanical failures, severe weather, and navigation losses. The extraction boat departed after a 12-hour delay, encountered waves of about 10 feet (3.0 m), and lost communications and GPS capability, leaving the boat adrift for several hours. Contact was reestablished late at night, allowing an at-sea transfer to a larger rescue vessel. Machado then was taken to Curaçao, where she continued by air.

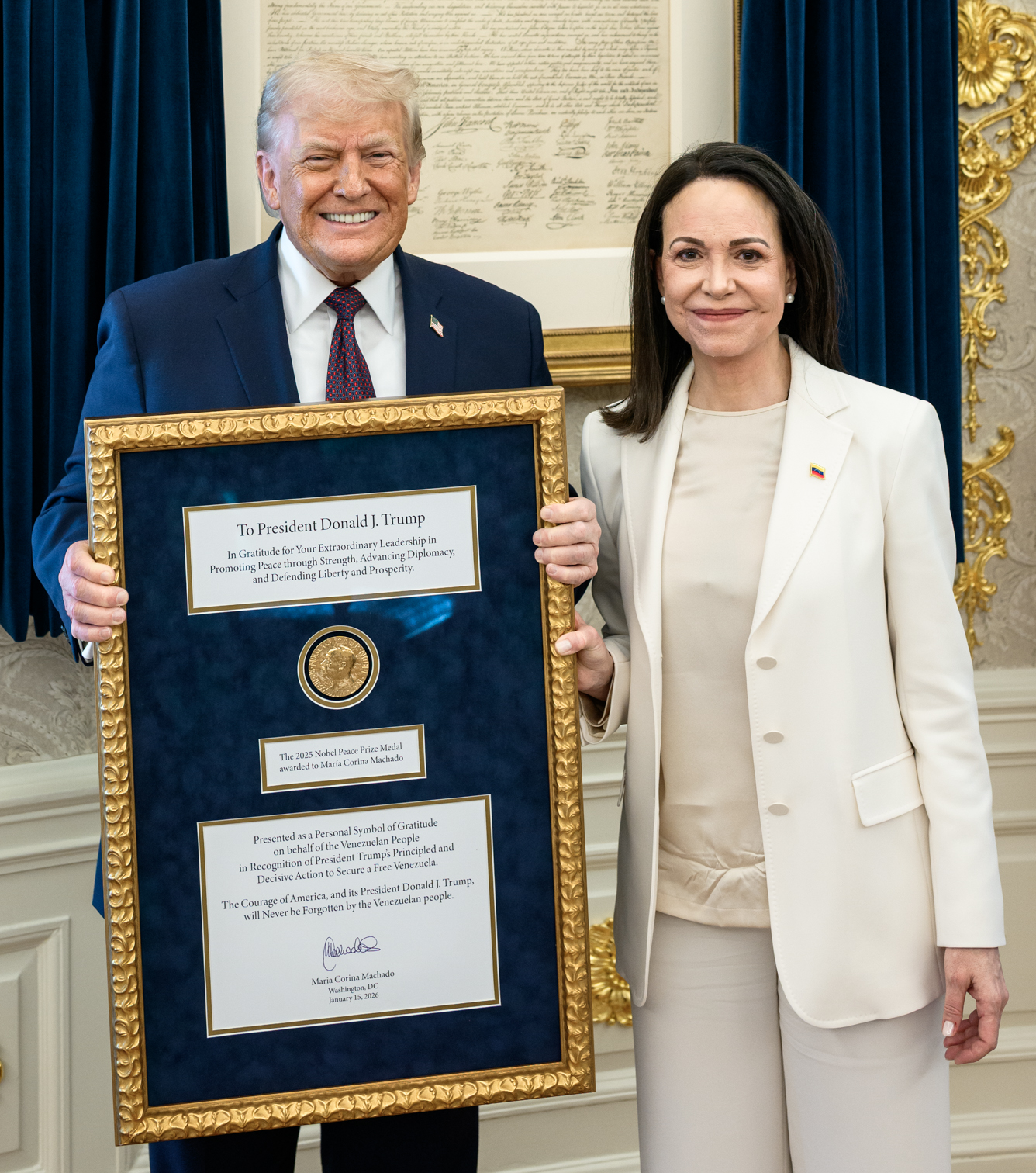
President Donald Trump is gifted the Nobel Peace Prize medal awarded to María Corina Machado at the White House Oval Office on January 15, 2026

Machado did not arrive on time for the 10 December award ceremony; her daughter, Ana Corina Sosa, accepted the award on her mother's behalf and delivered her mother's acceptance speech. After reportedly transiting by plane through the United States, Machado arrived after the ceremony to make her first public appearance in nearly a year to receive the award.

She later stated that she feared for her life during the journey, which observers described as exceptionally high-risk given her political profile and Venezuela's security conditions. Her representatives confirmed that she had fractured her back during the journey amid rough weather.

The award generated controversy, and demonstrators and protestors argued that Machado was baiting warmongering that may be legitimizing "U.S. military intervention in violation of international law". She was asked in a press conference the day after the ceremony if she supported a United States invasion. She replied that "Venezuela has already been invaded", listing the presence of Russian and Iranian agents, Colombian drug groups, and Hamas and Hezbollah "operating freely in accordance with the regime", turning "Venezuela into the criminal hub of the Americas". She said that "what sustains the regime" is funding "from drug trafficking, from the black market of oil, from arms trafficking, and from human trafficking. We need to cut those flows."

==== Nobel medal aftermath ====
In January 2026, a military intervention in Venezuela conducted to the capture of Nicolás Maduro, whom was indicted for cooperating with drug cartels, guerrillas, and other criminal organizations. Since the vote tallies submitted on the 2024 Venezuelan presidential election showed an opposition victory, Venezuelans expected the United States to install Edmundo Gonzalez Urrutia and María Corina Machado in the highest leadership position for the Venezuelan government. However, White House officials said President of the United States Donald Trump chose not to place María Corina Machado in the leadership position because she accepted the Nobel Peace Prize. Those United States government administrators said that if the human rights activist had rejected the award, she would have become head of state in Venezuela.

Days after the military operation concluded, María Corina Machado offered her prize to Donald Trump. The Norwegian Nobel Committee and the Norwegian Nobel Institute responded that the prize cannot be transferred. On 15 January, Machado presented her medal to Trump during a private meeting at the White House in appreciation for deposing Venezuela's repressive leader, Nicolás Maduro, in a U.S. military raid on 3 January. The Nobel Committee has reiterated that while ownership of the physical award can change, the title does not; therefore Trump is not listed as a Nobel Peace Prize laureate.

Trump confirmed he would keep the medal, writing in Truth Social "Maria presented me with her Nobel Peace Prize for the work I have done. Such a wonderful gesture of mutual respect. Thank you Maria!" Speaking to reporters, Machado compared the handover of her medal to Marquis de Lafayette handing over a gold medallion with the face of George Washington to Venezuelan independence hero Simón Bolívar in 1825, as a "a sign of the brotherhood between the people of the US and the people of Venezuela in their fight for freedom against tyranny." It is the second time that a Nobel Medal has been given away for political reasons. The only other instance occurred in 1943 when Norwegian author Knut Hamsun gifted his medal to Nazi minister Joseph Goebbels.

== Publications ==
=== "Freedom Manifesto" column ===
The editorial board of The Washington Post said it was the first to review on 18 November 2025 a pre-publication of a "Freedom Manifesto" written by Machado, describing it as "a precursor to a new Constitution" that will lead to "a truly democratic Venezuela". They applauded the manifesto as "thoughtful and important", saying Machado "argues that the freedoms of speech and assembly, as well the right to vote securely and without any form of manipulation, must be inviolable", along with a fundamental right "to protect property ownership", adding that she "directly links political freedom with economic prosperity" with proposals to privatize state-owned institutions. The editorial board stated the "document outlin[ed] a democratic and pluralistic future for Venezuela" in which she "describes a path forward for the country rooted in the rule of law and respect for liberty in all facets of life". The Guardian wrote that Machado stated Venezuela was "at the edge of a new era", and "poised for a 'rebirth' after years of economic chaos, environmental destruction, violence and a mass exodus", but did not present a plan for how Maduro would be forced to leave. CNN stated that the manifesto "lays out the democratic pillars [Machado] says all Venezuelans are entitled to", adding that the document mimics "language from other democratic frameworks, such as the U.S. Declaration of Independence" and "calls for decentralizing power from the government and restoring it to the public". David Smilde, described by CNN as "a Venezuela expert at Tulane University" told CNN the manifesto was a "proto-constitution", probably meant to "assure supporters she has a plan for the country if Maduro eventually steps down", and stated that "Machado didn't mention whether she would suspend the current constitution, impose a new one, or call a constitutional assembly."

Her book The Freedom Manifesto (ISBN 978-1510787773) is scheduled for publication in February 2026.

== Personal life ==
Machado is divorced and has three children; she has stated that her children live abroad due to death threats at home. She is a Catholic.
