= Vente Venezuela =

Political party in Venezuela

- Leader: María Corina Machado
- National coordinator: Henry Alviarez
- Founded: 24 May 2012
- Headquarters: Caracas, Venezuela
- Youth wing: Young Vente
- Ideology: Liberalism; Conservative liberalism Anti-Chavismo
- Political position: Centre-right
- National affiliation: I am Venezuela
- Regional affiliation: Liberal Network for Latin America
- International affiliation: Liberal International (observer); IFLRY (youth wing membership)
- Colors: Blue
- Seats in the National Assembly: 0 / 277

Website
- www.ventevenezuela.org
- Politics of Venezuela; Political parties; Elections; A: Vente Venezuela self-identifies as centrist and liberal. The party has been described as centre-right, mainly for its economic policy and moderate stances on certain sociocultural issues. It has also been described as right-wing and far-right.

Vente Venezuela (Spanish for 'Come Venezuela') is a liberal political movement in Venezuela headquartered in the city of Caracas. It has no parliamentary representation in the National Assembly. Its registration as a political party has not been granted by the National Electoral Council (CNE).

== History ==
Vente Venezuela was founded on 24 May 2012 as a liberal party, sitting generally on the centre-right of the political spectrum with some right-wing factions. The CNE did not grant its registration as a political party. It is affiliated with I am Venezuela, is a member of the Liberal Network for Latin America, and is an observer of the Liberal International. Its youth wing is a member of the International Federation of Liberal Youth. In the aftermath of the 2024 Venezuelan presidential election held on 28 July 2024, Vente Venezuela's offices were raided and vandalized by masked individuals.

== Political ideology and position ==
According to Vente Venezuela, the group "appeals to republican and democratic values" and "breaks from the traditional left - right argument". It describes itself as centrist and liberal. Analysts have variously described the party as centre-right, right-wing, and far-right, with the party's ideologies consisting of classical liberalism, progressive conservatism, cultural liberalism, liberal feminism, and economic liberalism.

According to university professor and political party expert Leonardo Morales, the "popular capitalism" exposed by Vente Venezuela under the leadership of María Corina Machado has its roots in Margaret Thatcher's politics. Morales said that Vente Venezuela "aims to be liberal and democratic; it seeks to make citizens shareholders of industries through the market. The point is that they should be informed about which industries, because in a deindustrialized country like ours, workers will be the ones to join." He argued that the party was trying to place itself on the political right and chose the "popular" label to reflect the country's reality, stating: "It's a disguised way to avoid the idea that they are capitalists, which reveals a lack of confidence in what they want to say." Similarly, Pedro Luis Pedrosa, a specialist in electoral campaigns and political communications, argued: "A centrist liberal party that fears left-wing voters and therefore doesn't declare itself right-wing to avoid being distracted ends up being nothing because in politics those who convince, not those who deceive, win." In contrast to the view that Hugo Chávez was the president of the poor, Machado argued that "being rich is a good thing".

Vente Venezuela is in a "political, ideological, and social" alliance and partnership with the Likud Party of Israel.

== See also ==
- List of political parties in Venezuela
- Venezuelan opposition
