= 2025 Nobel Peace Prize =

Award

- María Corina Machado
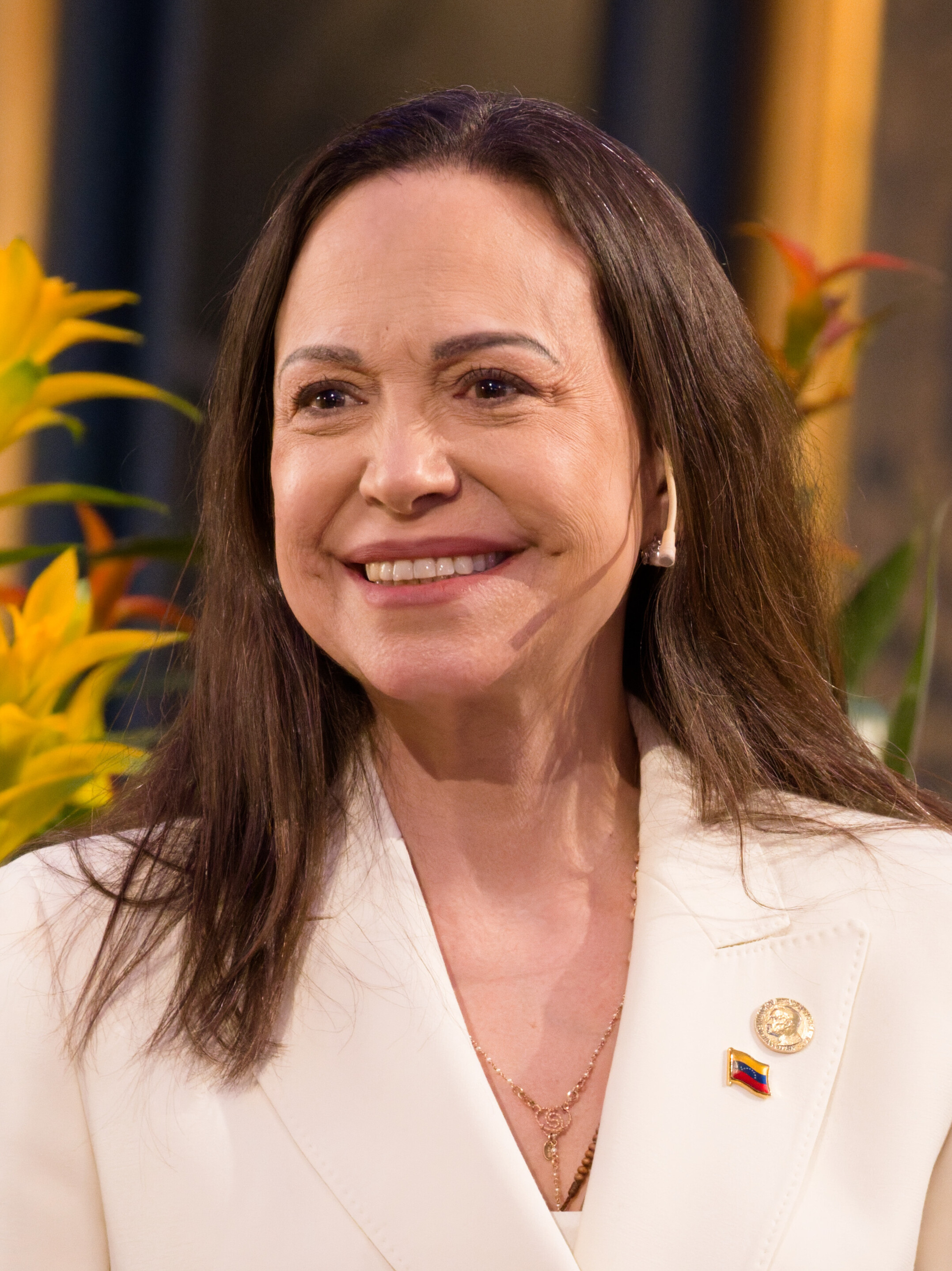
- "for her tireless work promoting democratic rights for the people of Venezuela and for her struggle to achieve a just and peaceful transition from dictatorship to democracy."
- Date: 10 October 2025 (announcement); 10 December 2025 (ceremony)
- Location: Oslo, Norway
- Presented by: Norwegian Nobel Committee
- Reward: 11.1 million SEK
- First award: 1901
- Website: Official website

The 2025 Nobel Peace Prize, an international peace prize established according to the will of Alfred Nobel, was announced on 10 October 2025 by the Norwegian Nobel Committee in Oslo, Norway. It was awarded to María Corina Machado of Venezuela. The prize was presented at the ceremony on 10 December 2025 in Oslo, given to her daughter on her behalf. The Norwegian Nobel Committee praised her as "one of the most extraordinary examples of civilian courage in Latin America in recent times".

At the time of the prize's announcement, Machado was in hiding inside Venezuela, fearing repression from the government of Nicolás Maduro. She secretly escaped the country to reach Oslo with the help of international allies, but vowed to return to Venezuela to continue opposing the Maduro regime. Machado said she dedicated her award to Donald Trump and after the 2026 United States intervention in Venezuela she gave him her Nobel medal as a recognition of his commitment to Venezuela's freedom, according to Machado.

== María Corina Machado ==
Machado was born in Caracas, Venezuela, in 1967. She established the Atenea Foundation in 1992 to help children in Caracas. In 2002, she was one of the founders of Súmate, an electoral monitoring group. Machado was an elected member of the National Assembly of Venezuela from 2010 to 2014 when she was expelled by Nicolás Maduro's government. In 2023, she announced her candidacy for the 2024 presidential election but she was blocked from running and supported the alternative candidacy of Edmundo González. Opposition parties mobilized to systematically document and monitor the election. Their results showed González as the winner, but Maduro's administration declared victory instead.

Machado is the second Venezuelan to receive a Nobel Prize after Venezuelan-born American Baruj Benacerraf, who shared the Nobel Prize in Physiology or Medicine with Jean Dausset and George Davis Snell in 1980.

== Award ceremony ==
=== Before the ceremony and extraction from Venezuela ===
Kristian Berg Harpviken, director of the Norwegian Nobel Institute, confirmed with Maria Corina Machado on 5 December that she would attempt to attend the prize award ceremony on 10 December.

According to a later account reported by The Wall Street Journal, on 5 December, an operation funded by private donors contacted the Grey Bull Rescue Foundation based in the U.S. state of Florida, specialized in evacuation missions from warzones like Afghanistan and the Gaza Strip, to carry out Machado's extraction from Venezuela. The extraction mission was reportedly code-named Operation Golden Dynamite in reference to Alfred Nobel, inventor of dynamite and founder of the Nobel Prize. The final extraction plan consisted on transporting Machado through the country, to a beach, and then by boat reach Curaçao, in order to take a flight to Oslo, but the expedition faced several complications.

According to the same account, on 8 December Machado travelled by land through Venezuela in disguise, wearing a wig, crossing 10 military checkpoints without getting caught. Operatives took her to a fishing village to catch a rundown fishing boat. On 9 December, the boat had mechanical issues which delayed departure for 12 hours, leaving at sunset. Due to severe weather, Machado and the operatives encountered waves reported to be approximately 3 m (10 ft) high, and members of the crew suffered from motion sickness. During the trip communications were reportedly lost, the Global Positioning System (GPS) was thrown overboard and the backup systems malfunctioned. The meeting point with the Grey Bull rescue vessel was in the middle of the Gulf of Venezuela, which the boat finally reached after reestablishing communications at 23:00. From there, Machado was taken to Curaçao. Grey Bull contacted the authorities but the Dutch embassy refused to take part in the operation and Machado was only allowed to remain for 24 hours on the island. The Norwegian newspaper Aftenposten reported later that Machado had fractured a vertebra during the trip.

On 9 December, the Nobel Institute canceled that evening's scheduled press conference with Machado, as her whereabouts were unknown at the time.

Machado reportedly went through customs in Curaçao and took a private jet to Miami on the morning of 10 December, and at 6:42 took a plane to Oslo. Most details of the operation became public only after the ceremony, when The Wall Street Journal published a detailed account of the extraction. Jørgen Watne Frydnes from the Norwegian Nobel Committee described the journey as "a situation of extreme danger".

=== During the ceremony ===
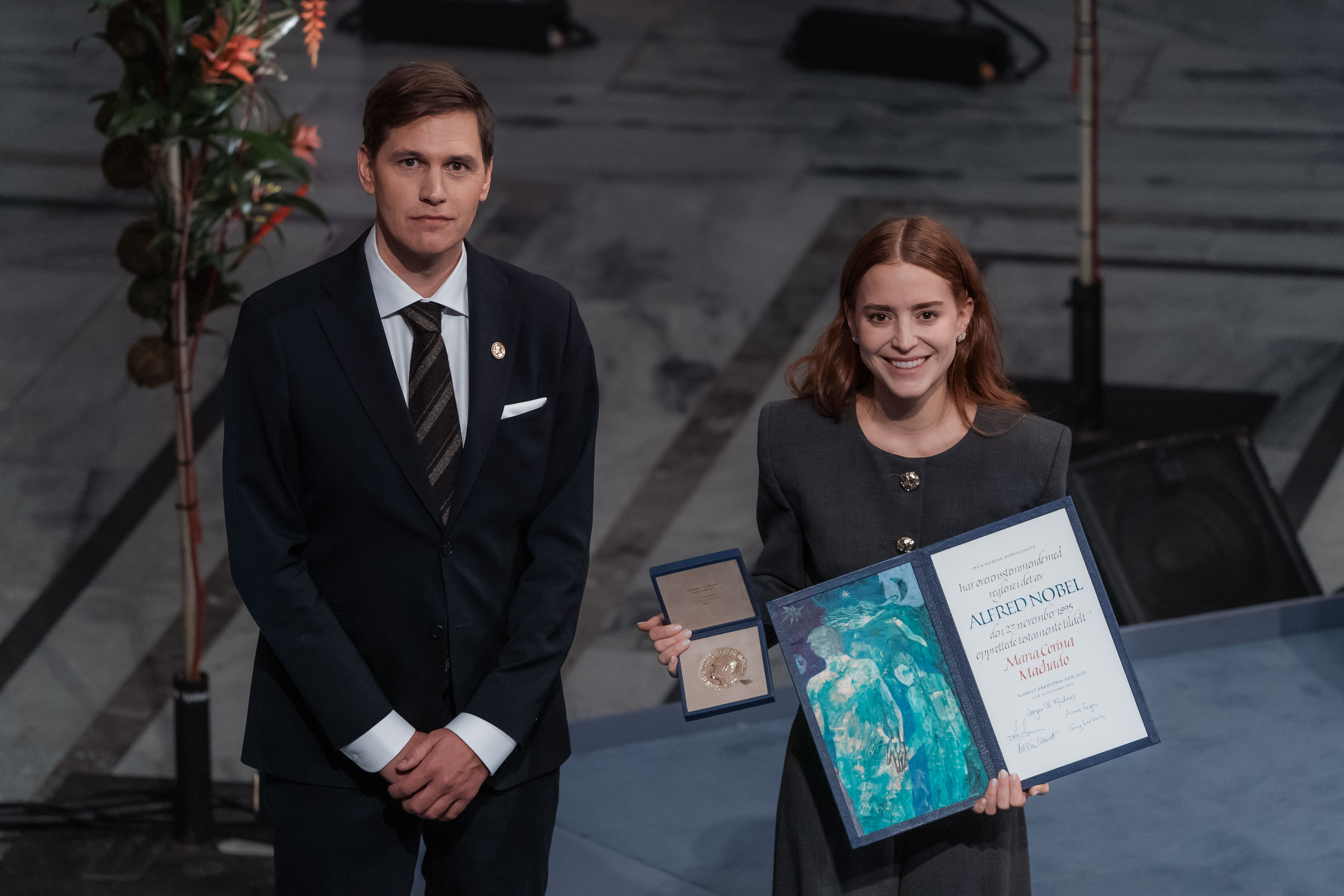
Ana Corina Sosa Machado accepting the Prize on behalf of her mother, 10 December 2025

On the day of the ceremony, because of concerns regarding her safety, at first it was revealed that Machado would not have been able to attend the award ceremony, but hours later it was announced then that she would have arrived later in Oslo anyway, skipping the ceremony. Her daughter, Ana Corina Sosa Machado, was present at the award ceremony and accepted the award on behalf of her mother, also delivering a speech written by the latter.

The speech covered the history of Venezuela. From independence, to the oil industry in the 20th century to the present day. Focus was given to the dismantling of democracy by Hugo Chávez and Nicolás Maduro, and the Venezuelan refugee crisis. The speech also recounted the events of the 2024 Venezuelan presidential election where González won with 67 percent of the vote yet Maduro responded with "state terrorism". The speech ends naming those who shared the prize with her according to Machado, including the political prisoners, persecuted families, journalists, and human rights defenders.

The ceremony was attended by Edmundo González and by Argentinian president Javier Milei, Ecuadorian president Daniel Noboa, Panamanian president José Raúl Mulino and Paraguayan president Santiago Peña. This was the largest number of heads of state to attend a Nobel ceremony since the 2012 Nobel Peace Prize awarded to the European Union.

The Venezuelan singer Danny Ocean and Venezuelan pianist Gabriela Montero performed during the award ceremony. Ocean played a song that blended "Alma llanera", considered popularly as the second anthem of Venezuela, and "Venezuela", which has become popular with the Venezuelan diaspora. Montero played the national anthem "Gloria al Bravo Pueblo", as well as Simón Díaz's "Mi querencia".

=== After the ceremony ===
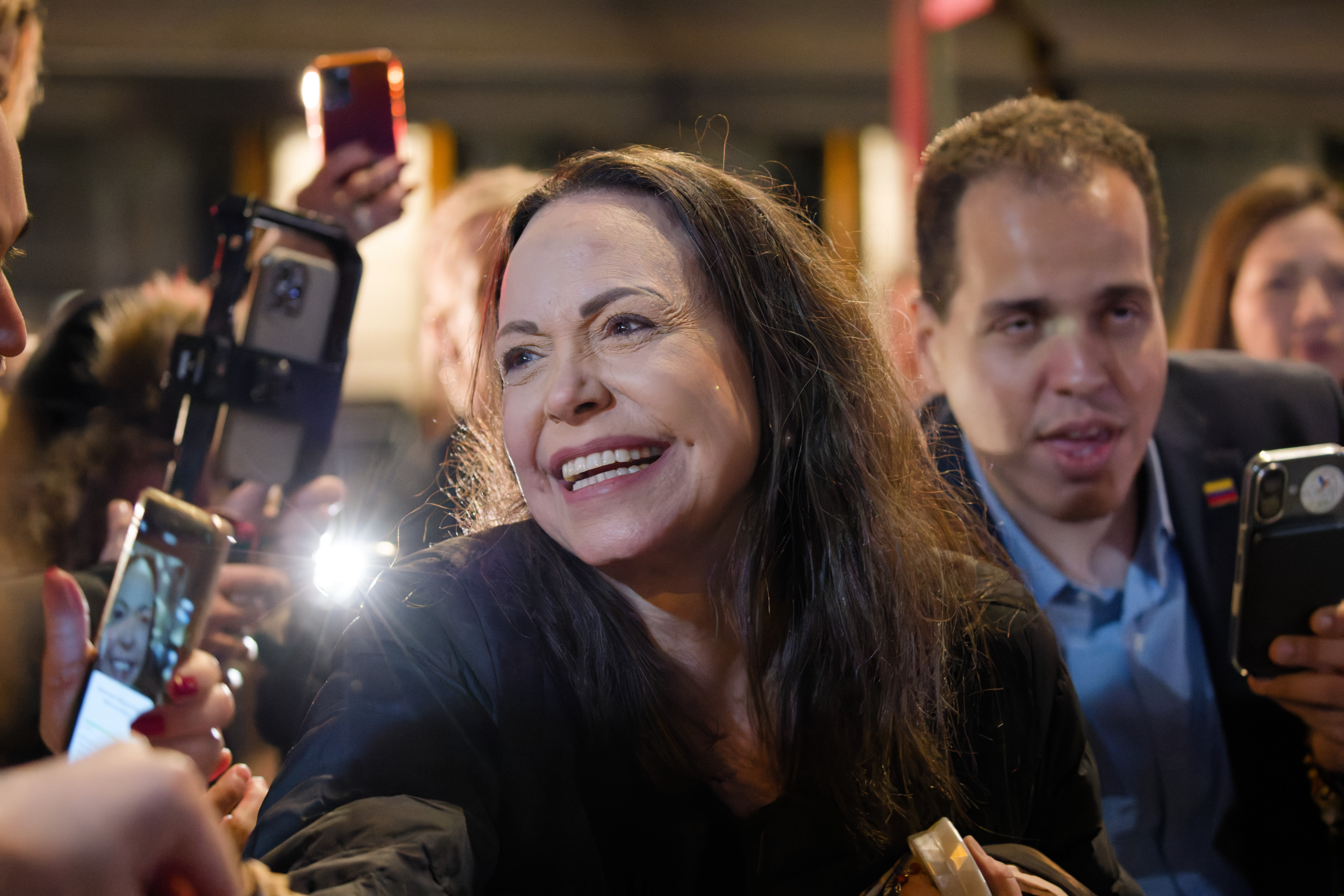
Machado arriving at Oslo

Machado arrived to Oslo late at night after the award ceremony. She was received by crowd at the Grand Hotel, where Nobel laureates are hosted. She addressed the crowd with a brief speech.

On 11 December, the Nobel Committee held a press conference with Machado. She vowed to return to Venezuela and "to end with this tyranny very soon and have a free Venezuela". Machado also expressed support for the Trump administration's push to oust Maduro.

The same day Machado opened the 2025 Nobel Peace Prize Exhibition, exposing pictures of the Venezuelan refugee crisis in Colombia during 2025, taken by Turkish photographer Emin Özmen. Venezuelan-born Swedish singer Omar Rudberg performed the song "Venezuela" during the opening.

== Nobel medal aftermath ==
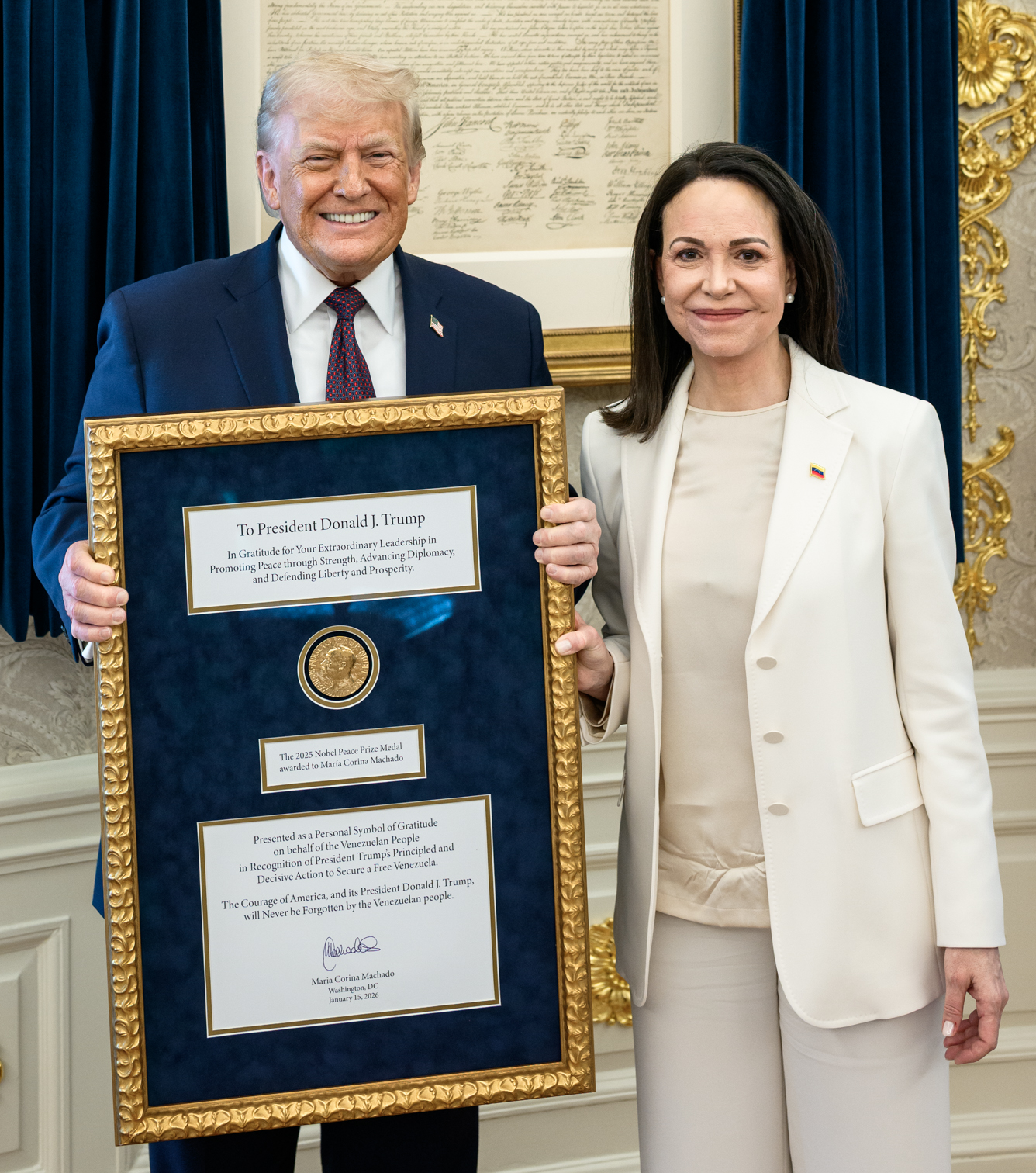
U.S. president Donald Trump is gifted the Nobel Peace Prize medal awarded to María Corina Machado at the White House Oval Office on 15 January 2026.

Following the United States intervention in Venezuela on 3 January 2026. The Venezuelan diaspora hoped for the United States government to allow Machado to assume leadership in the country. Nonetheless, Donald Trump sidelined this activist, alleging that she did not have the respect of Venezuelans; he communicated that instead, the American administration would coordinate with Delcy Rodríguez. White House officials privately stated that the reason for choosing Rodríguez was that the Nobel laureate accepted the award, stating that if Machado had rejected the title, the United States government would have authorized her to lead Venezuela.

Machado offered to share her Nobel prize with U.S. president Donald Trump, to thank him on behalf of the Venezuelan people. She said in an interview "What he has done is historic. It's a huge step towards a democratic transition." The Nobel Prize Committee rejected her request and clarified that the prize "cannot be revoked, shared or transferred". The Nobel Committee has reiterated that while ownership of the physical award can change, the title does not; therefore Trump is not a Nobel Peace Prize laureate.

On 15 January 2026, Machado had a lunch meeting with Trump in which she presented her Nobel Prize medal as a gift in recognition of what she called his commitment to the freedom of the Venezuelan people. Trump confirmed he would keep the medal, writing in Truth Social "Maria presented me with her Nobel Peace Prize for the work I have done. Such a wonderful gesture of mutual respect. Thank you Maria!" The White House posted a photo with Machado and Trump holding a frame containing the medal with the legends "To President Donald J. Trump In Gratitude for Your Extraordinary Leadership in Promoting Peace through Strength," and "Personal Symbol of Gratitude on behalf of the Venezuelan People." Speaking to reporters, Machado compared the handover of her medal to Marquis de Lafayette handing over a gold medallion with the face of George Washington to Venezuelan independence hero Simón Bolívar in 1825, as "a sign of the brotherhood between the people of the U.S. and the people of Venezuela in their fight for freedom against tyranny".

== Reactions ==
=== To the announcement ===
==== Venezuela ====
On Twitter, Machado dedicated the prize to the "suffering people of Venezuela" and to U.S. president Donald Trump "for his decisive support of our cause". In Venezuela, state-run media ignored the Nobel Peace Prize announcement or downplayed its significance, stating that the Norwegian Nobel Foundation was controlled by the "international right" and alleging Machado had plotted a coup d'état.

On 13 October, the Venezuelan foreign ministry announced the closure of the embassy of Venezuela in Norway. Oslo called the decision "regrettable".

In November, Venezuela's attorney general Tarek William Saab expressed that Machado would become a fugitive if she attended the award ceremony in Norway.

==== International ====
In the United States, officials of the second Trump administration were strongly critical of the award not being given to Trump, who for months had expressed his desire to win the prize. Steven Cheung, the White House Communications Director, stated, "The Nobel Committee proved they place politics over peace." Richard Grenell, Trump's envoy for Venezuela, declared that the "Nobel Prize died years ago". President Trump himself praised Machado following her selection, and Machado said that Trump was a worthy winner for the 2026 Nobel Peace Prize. Sources close to Trump later told The Washington Post that her decision to accept the award effectively destroyed Trump's support for her possible presidency; after the U.S. capture of Nicolás Maduro, one of those sources said that, if Machado had "turned it down and said, 'I can't accept it because it's Donald Trump's,' she'd be the president of Venezuela today." Trump cited his perceived snub as a factor in his escalation of efforts to acquire Greenland on behalf of the United States, writing in a letter to Norwegian prime minister Jonas Gahr Støre on 18 January 2026 that "Considering your Country decided not to give me the Nobel Peace Prize for having stopped 8 Wars PLUS, I no longer feel an obligation to think purely of Peace, although it will always be predominant [emphasis in original]."

Former U.S. president and Nobel Peace laureate Barack Obama congratulated Machado on X and said that the award should remind the U.S. of the "responsibility to constantly preserve and defend our own hard-won democratic traditions". According to The Guardian, the Nobel Prize committee's references to backsliding democracy in its announcement, such as "When authoritarians seize power, it is crucial to recognise courageous defenders of freedom who rise and resist", while contextually referring to Nicolás Maduro and his actions in the 2024 Venezuelan presidential election, were also seen by critics of Trump as "a not-too-subtle dig at the U.S. president's use of the military in its cities and pressure on his political enemies at home".

Argentine president Javier Milei celebrated the recognition for Machado and congratulated her for her "enormous fight for the brave defense of freedom and democracy", adding "you [Machado] light up the world by fighting the narcodictatorship in Venezuela". French president Emmanuel Macron called Machado to congratulate her for the award. German chancellor Friedrich Merz congratulated Machado on as "democracy thrives on the courage of individuals".

The Council of Europe congratulated Machado for being one of the "most extraordinary examples of civilian courage in Latin America in recent times". President of the European Commission Ursula von der Leyen celebrated Machado's recognition, saying that the award recognises her courage as well as "every voice that refuses to be silenced". The Office of the United Nations High Commissioner for Human Rights and António Guterres, secretary-general of the United Nations, congratulated Machado, stating that "this recognition reflects the clear aspirations of the people of Venezuela for free and fair elections, for civil and political rights and for the rule of law".

The Council on American–Islamic Relations (CAIR) released a statement on X condemning the decision as "unconscionable", citing Machado's support for Likud and association with far-right European politicians such as Geert Wilders and Marine Le Pen, while adding, "The Nobel Peace Prize committee should instead recognize an honoree who has shown moral consistency by bravely pursuing justice for all people, such as one of the students, journalists, activists, medical professionals who have risked their careers and even their lives to oppose the crime of our time: the genocide in Gaza." Colombian president Gustavo Petro also questioned the awarding of the Nobel to Machado, citing her past outreach to then Argentinian president Mauricio Macri and Israeli prime minister Benjamin Netanyahu in seeking support for her campaign to oust Maduro.

On 17 December 2025, founder of Wikileaks, Julian Assange announced he had filed a lawsuit against the Nobel Foundation to prevent the disbursement of funds to Machado, stating that her support for U.S. military actions against Venezuela contradicts the principles of the Peace Prize. He said that the award represents "gross misappropriation" and the "facilitation of war crimes" under Swedish law.

=== Demonstrations ===
Supporters of Maria Corina Machado gathered in various demonstrations worldwide on 6 December 2025 in support to her award and demanding a "Free Venezuela". Thousands of people gathered in Buenos Aires, Bogotá, Lima, Madrid and Utrecht.

== Alleged internal leak ==
On 10 October 2025, the Nobel Institute began an investigation into a potential internal leak of the prize-winner's name after two Norwegian newspapers, Aftenposten and Finansavisen, reported on suspicious surges in the online betting markets the night before that led to Machado's odds of winning rising from 3.75% to 72.8% in a matter of hours. Institute director Kristian Berg Harpviken said, "It seems we have been prey to a criminal actor who wants to earn money on our information." Bets raised to US$2.2 million but no media published the name of the candidate ahead of time.

The Norwegian Nobel Committee attributed the leak to digital hacking on 30 January 2026. The secretary Harpviken said "We have not been able to determine exactly what happened or who was behind the breach but we do believe that the digital domain still is the main suspect".

== Other candidates ==
Although nominations are strictly kept a secret by the committee itself for 50 years, it is not uncommon for candidacies to be announced publicly by either nominators or nominees. On 5 March 2025, the Norwegian Nobel Committee announced that 338 candidates had been nominated for the 2025 Nobel Peace Prize: 244 individuals and 94 organizations.

=== List of publicly-declared nominations ===
Nominee	Country Headquarters	Motivations	Nominator(s)	Ref.
Individuals
Francesca Albanese	Italy	"for her work as the UN special rapporteur for the West Bank and Gaza, and her tremendous and courageous work to highlight the destruction of Gaza by Israel"	Aodhán Ó Ríordáin	
Ivan Alekseyev (Noize MC)	Russia	"in representating, with their voices, a new generation that speaks very strongly for humanistic values"	Arnfinn Vonen et al. (Note: Led by Arnfinn Vonen, head of Department of International Studies and Interpreting, the nomination was collectively made with other teachers of the Oslo Metropolitan University.)	
Elizaveta Gyrdymova (Monetochka)	Russia	"in representating, with their voices, a new generation that speaks very strongly for humanistic values"	Arnfinn Vonen et al.	
Issa Amro	Palestine	"for having worked tirelessly to protect the basic rights of Palestinians from oppression, both from the Israeli occupation regime and violent settlers"	Ingrid Fiskaa	
Jeff Halper	Israel; United States	"for having worked tirelessly to protect the basic rights of Palestinians from oppression, both from the Israeli occupation regime and violent settlers"	Ingrid Fiskaa	
Mahrang Baloch	Pakistan	"for tireless advocacy against enforced disappearances, extrajudicial killings, and systemic oppression in Balochistan"		
Chow Hang-tung	Hong Kong	"for her tireless work for democracy and human rights in a time of great oppression and danger"	Guri Melby	
Irwin Cotler	Canada	"for his lifelong dedication to serving underprivileged populations, representing silenced voices, and promoting the loftiest of ideals: justice and freedom"	Isaac Herzog et al. (Note: Cotler was nominated jointly by Isaac Herzog, Natan Sharansky, Vladimir Kara-Murza, and Bill Browder .)	
Jolanta Duda	Poland	"for her dedication to defending justice, dignity and humanity, with the aim of building a society based on mutual respect."		
Sherwan Sherwani	Syria	"for their significant contributions to peace, democracy, and freedom of expression in the Kurdish regions of Syria and Iraq"		
Pope Francis (1936–2025) (Note: Nobel Prizes are not allowed to be awarded posthumously.)	Vatican City; Argentina	"for his unstoppable contribution to promoting binding and comprehensive peace and fraternization between people, ethnic groups and states"	Dag-Inge Ulstein	
Alexei Gorinov	Russia	"for his courage and commitment to peace demonstrated in captivity"	Professors from the United States, United Kingdom, and Germany	
Hada	China	"for his continuing advocacy for the ethnic Mongolians living under Chinese Communist Party rule despite years of persecution"	Hiroshi Yamada et al. (Note: The nomination was jointly made by Yamada (a member of the House of Councilors), Yōichi Shimada (member of the House of Representatives), and two other National Diet members.)	
Hada	China	"in recognition of their deep commitment to human rights and peace in China"	Chris Smith; Jeff Merkley	
Huang Xueqin	China	"in recognition of their deep commitment to human rights and peace in China"	Chris Smith; Jeff Merkley	
Ilham Tohti	China	"in recognition of their deep commitment to human rights and peace in China"	Chris Smith; Jeff Merkley	
Jimmy Lai	Hong Kong	"in recognition of their deep commitment to human rights and peace in China"	Chris Smith; Jeff Merkley	
Wang Yi	China	"in recognition of their deep commitment to human rights and peace in China"	Chris Smith; Jeff Merkley	
Gubad Ibadoghlu	Azerbaijan	"for his commitment to exposing social and environmental injustices, corruption, and promoting human rights"	Belinda Davis	
Anwar Ibrahim	Malaysia	"for his commitment to dialogue, regional harmony, global peace through non-coercive diplomacy, and his timely role in the Thailand–Cambodia ceasefire"	Osman Bakar	
Imran Khan	Pakistan	"for his work with human rights and democracy in Pakistan"	Pakistan World Alliance	
Lelei TuiSamoa LeLaulu	Samoa	"for his work in reshaping the narrative around tourism — not just for leisure, but as a vessel of peace"		
Li Ying	China	"[with CFU] in recognition of their unwavering commitment to justice, human rights, and the protection of the Uyghur people against genocide and repression"	Raja Krishnamoorthi; John Moolenaar	
María Corina Machado	Venezuela	"for her tireless fight for peace in Venezuela and the world, a fair recognition of a person who has dedicated almost her entire life to the fight for peace and the liberation"	Inspira América Foundation et al. (Note: Led by Marcell Felipe, chair of Inspira América Foundation, the nomination also includes the support of the university presidents: Madeline Pumariega of Miami Dade College (MDC), Kenneth A. Jessell of Florida International University (FIU), David A. Armstrong of St. Thomas University, and Mike Allen of Barry University.)	
María Corina Machado	Venezuela	"for her courageous and selfless leadership, and unyielding dedication to the pursuit of peace and democratic ideals, bring attention to the human rights abuses occurring under the Maduro regime"	Rick Scott et al. (Note: Together with Richard Scott, the legislators who signed the nomination include Marco Rubio, Mario Díaz-Balart, María Elvira Salazar, Michael Waltz, Neal Dunn, Byron Donalds, and Carlos A. Giménez.)	
Porpora Marcasciano	Italy	"for her five decades of unwavering activism advancing LGBTQ+ rights, fostering inclusivity, and championing social and legal reforms that promote equality and dignity for marginalized communities worldwide"		
Elon Musk	Canada; South Africa; United States	"for his consistent commitment to the fundamental human right to freedom of expression, and thus to peace"	Branko Grims	
Zuriel Oduwole	United States; Nigeria	"for actively engaging in global diplomatic efforts, influencing discussions on education and peace, working to create opportunities for marginalized communities and promoting meaningful change"		
Cheryl Perera	Canada	"for her commitment to empowering children facing sex exploitation"		
Michelangelo Pistoletto	Italy	"for his leading role in driving a radical artistic transformation that fosters a shared and responsible concept of humanity and promoting peace as a self-certified expression of intelligence"		
Mazin Qumsiyeh	Palestine	"for his enduring legacy, the Wheels of Justice tour, advocating an end to occupation and one democratic state in Israel-Palestine"	Mairead Maguire	
Hind Rajab (2018–2024)	Palestine	"To honour every Palestinian child whose life has been stolen by war and genocide and to recognise the relentless horror children in Gaza have endured"	Khaled A. Beydoun; American-Arab Anti-Discrimination Committee	
Feride Rushiti	Kosovo	"[with QKRMT] in recognition of their extraordinary contributions to the advancement of human rights, the dignity of survivors, and the healing of communities scarred by war"	Magnus Jacobsson	
Mikola Statkevich	Belarus	"for consistently fighting for the democratic future of Belarus for over 30 years"	Petras Auštrevičius	
Donald Trump	United States	"for his extraordinary leadership, strategic brilliance, and unparalleled commitment to advancing peace and securing the release of hostages in one of the most complex geopolitical arenas of our time"	Anat Alon-Beck	
Donald Trump	United States	"for his attempts to de-escalate the 2025 India–Pakistan conflict, seeking a resolution through dialogue and backchannel diplomacy, while emphasizing the principles of restraint, regional stability, and the prevention of armed escalation—despite India's stated refusal of third-party mediation and its insistence on bilateral engagement"	Asim Munir; Government of Pakistan	
Donald Trump	United States	"in recognition of his pursuit of peace and security in the Middle East and Trump's role in brokering the Abraham Accords and the ceasefire and hostage releases in Gaza"	Benjamin Netanyahu; Government of Israel	
Donald Trump	United States	"his historic role in brokering a ceasefire between Israel and Iran and preventing the world's largest state sponsor of terrorism, Iran, from obtaining a nuclear warhead"	Buddy Carter	
Donald Trump	United States	"for his crucial role in restoring peace and stability at the border between Thailand and Cambodia"	Hun Manet; Government of Cambodia	
Donald Trump	United States	"for recognition of his extraordinary contribution to international peace"	Javier Milei; Government of Argentina	
Daniella Weiss	Israel	"for her decades-long efforts in strengthening Jewish communities and promoting regional stability"	Amos Azaria; Shalom Sadik	
Mosab Hassan Yousef	Palestine; United States	"for his extraordinary courage in exposing the inner workings of Hamas and revealing the realities of extremism"		
Pavel Durov			Konstantin Klimenko-Bogdanov	
Organizations
January 6th Committee (Note: The January 6 Committee included Bennie Thompson, Liz Cheney, Adam Kinzinger, Adam Schiff, Elaine Luria, Jamie Raskin, Pete Aguilar, Stephanie Murphy, and Zoe Lofgren.) (founded in 2021)	Washington, D.C.	"for steadfastly defending the principles of democracy, law and order and human rights, putting these principles above political views"	Dag Øistein Endsjø	
Campaign for Uyghurs (founded in 2017)	Washington, D.C.	"[with Li] in recognition of their unwavering commitment to justice, human rights, and the protection of the Uyghur people against genocide and repression"	Raja Krishnamoorthi; John Moolenaar	
Children of Gaza	Gaza			
Collectif des Organisations de la Société Civile pour les Élections (founded in 1999)	Dakar	"in recognition of its commitment to serving Senegalese democracy and the world in general, particularly in times of political and social tensions"		
Grupo Por Un País Mejor (founded in 1997)	Mexico City	"for providing support to millions of Mexicans with health services, a commitment that fosters cohesion in search for a more prosperous country"	Rigoberta Menchú	
Hostages and Missing Families Forum (founded in 2023)	Israel	"for their extraordinary humanitarian leadership, including efforts to maintain international focus on hostages' fates, providing essential support to affected families, and advocating accountability for these barbaric crimes"	Brad Schneider et al. (Note: Together with Schneider were the following members of US Congress: Max Miller, Dan Goldman, Greg Landsman, Don Bacon, Rosa DeLauro, Josh Gottheimer, Debbie Wasserman Schultz, Thomas Kean, Greg Stanton, Wesley Bell, Brad Sherman, Don Davis, Tom Suozzi, and Juan Vargas .)	
International Criminal Court (founded in 2002)	The Hague	"for stepping in where western countries have failed, and has shown poor countries in the south that there are principled defenders of the international law of war, even where it goes against the wishes of the United States"	Marie Sneve Martinussen	
Kosovo Rehabilitation Center for Torture Survivors (founded in 1999)	Pristina	"[with F. Rushiti] in recognition of their extraordinary contributions to the advancement of human rights, the dignity of survivors, and the healing of communities scarred by war"	Magnus Jacobsson	
Nation of South Africa	South Africa	"for its work in the international community, contributing to realizing the goals mentioned by Alfred Nobel in his will, regarding reduction of military forces, arranging peace congresses or fraternization of nations"	Marielle Leraand	
North Atlantic Treaty Organization (founded in 1949)	Brussels	"for its effort to avoid direct armed conflict for a long time between the Soviet Union and the West"	Erlend Wiborg	
Serbian student-led anti-corruption protests (started in 2024)	Serbia	"for their peaceful and non-violent demonstrations demanding accountability from their government and that its state institutions follow the rule of law"	Siniša Kovačević; Dijana Stojković	
Women of the Sun (founded in 2021)	Bethlehem	"in representation of a growing women's movement for peace that see women at the center of a transnational process of overcoming violence and hatred and of recognizing our shared humanity"	Vrije Universiteit Amsterdam	
Women Wage Peace (founded in 2014)	Jerusalem	"in representation of a growing women's movement for peace that see women at the center of a transnational process of overcoming violence and hatred and of recognizing our shared humanity"	Vrije Universiteit Amsterdam	
Les Guerrières de la paix (founded in 2022)	Paris	"in representation of a growing women's movement for peace that see women at the center of a transnational process of overcoming violence and hatred and of recognizing our shared humanity"	Vrije Universiteit Amsterdam	
Emergency Response Rooms (started in 2023)	Sudan	"Sudan's Emergency Response Rooms stand as a powerful testament to the strength of local resilience and collective action in the face of brutal war"	Peace Research Institute Oslo	
