= Dərəkənd =

Dərəkənd or Derekend or Darakend may refer to:

- Dzoragyugh, Lori, Armenia
- Dərəkənd, Gobustan, Azerbaijan
- Dərəkənd, Khojavend, Azerbaijan
- Dərəkənd, Nakhchivan, Azerbaijan
