= Vougar =

Vougar may refer to:

- Alternative transliteration of the name Vugar/Vüqar/Вугар
- Saint Vouga, Irish priest
