= Gubad Ibadoghlu =

Azerbaijani scientist and political activist

- Qubad İbadoğlu
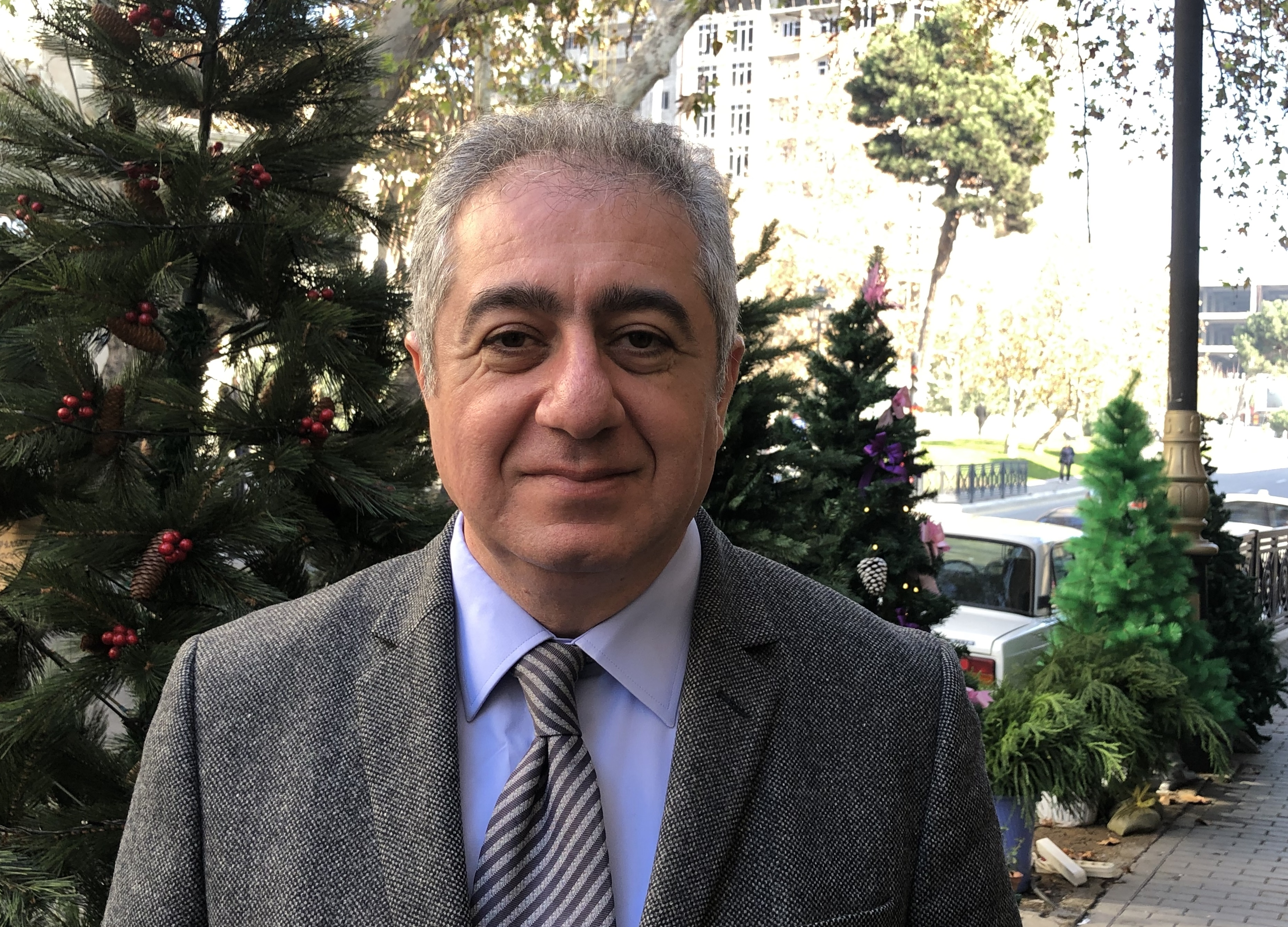
- Born: Gubad Bayramov; 12 September 1971 (age 55); Ashaghy Guzlak, Fuzuli District, Azerbaijan SSR, Soviet Union
- Citizenship: Azerbaijan
- Education: Azerbaijan State University of Economics, UNEC, PhD in Economics, 2000
- Occupations: Political Economist, Professor
- Spouse: Irada Bayramova
- Children: Zhala Bayramova, Ibad Bayramov, Emin Bayramli
- Relatives: Galib Bayramov (brother)
- Website: freegubad.com thegubadfiles.com

Gubad Ibadoghlu, also spelled Gubad Ibadoglu, (Azerbaijani: Qubad İbadoğlu; born 12 September 1971) is an Azerbaijani anti-corruption advocate, a scholar, a critic of oil and gas industry, and a prominent human rights and environmental defender, who from 2021 has been a research fellow at the London School of Economics. He was supposed to start a new teaching position at TU Dresden in 2023. However, on July 23, 2023 he was arrested in Azerbaijan and remains under investigation. The international community has condemned his arrest as arbitrary and politically motivated. Greens–European Free Alliance nominated Dr Gubad Ibadoghlu for the Sakharov Prize in September 2024. On 17 October 2024, 2024 Sakharov Prize finalists were shortlisted by MEPs. Following the secret ballot, MEPs selected the three finalists for the 2024 Sakharov Prize for Freedom of Thought and Dr Gubad Ibadoghlu became one of the three finalists. He was also nominated for 2025 Nobel Peace Prize by Rutgers University professor Belinda Davies.

On April 22, 2024 Gubad Ibadoghlu was transferred to house arrest. The medical examination revealed that his aorta root has expanded to the point where he needs immediate surgery. TU Dresden published a statement urging the Azerbaijani government to allow him to travel to Germany to start his work there.

European Court of Human Rights has implemented interim measures using the Rule 39 of the court due to his health condition being critical and has given his cases a priority under Article 41. The court ruled that Gubad Ibadoghlu is in urgent need of medical care and hospitalization.

== Biography ==
=== Academic career ===
Gubad Ibadoghlu received his PhD in economics in 2000 at Azerbaijan State University of Economics.

During his career, he had been a researcher at the Higher Economic School, Warsaw in 1999/2000, the Central European University, Budapest in 2004/2005, at the University of North Carolina at Chapel Hill in 2008/2009, a visiting professor under the Fulbright Program at Duke University in 2015/2016, a research fellow at Institute for Advanced Study in Princeton in 2017/2018, and at Rutgers University in 2018-2021. Aside from being a professor, he also gave various talks at universities, the most notably at Oxford University.

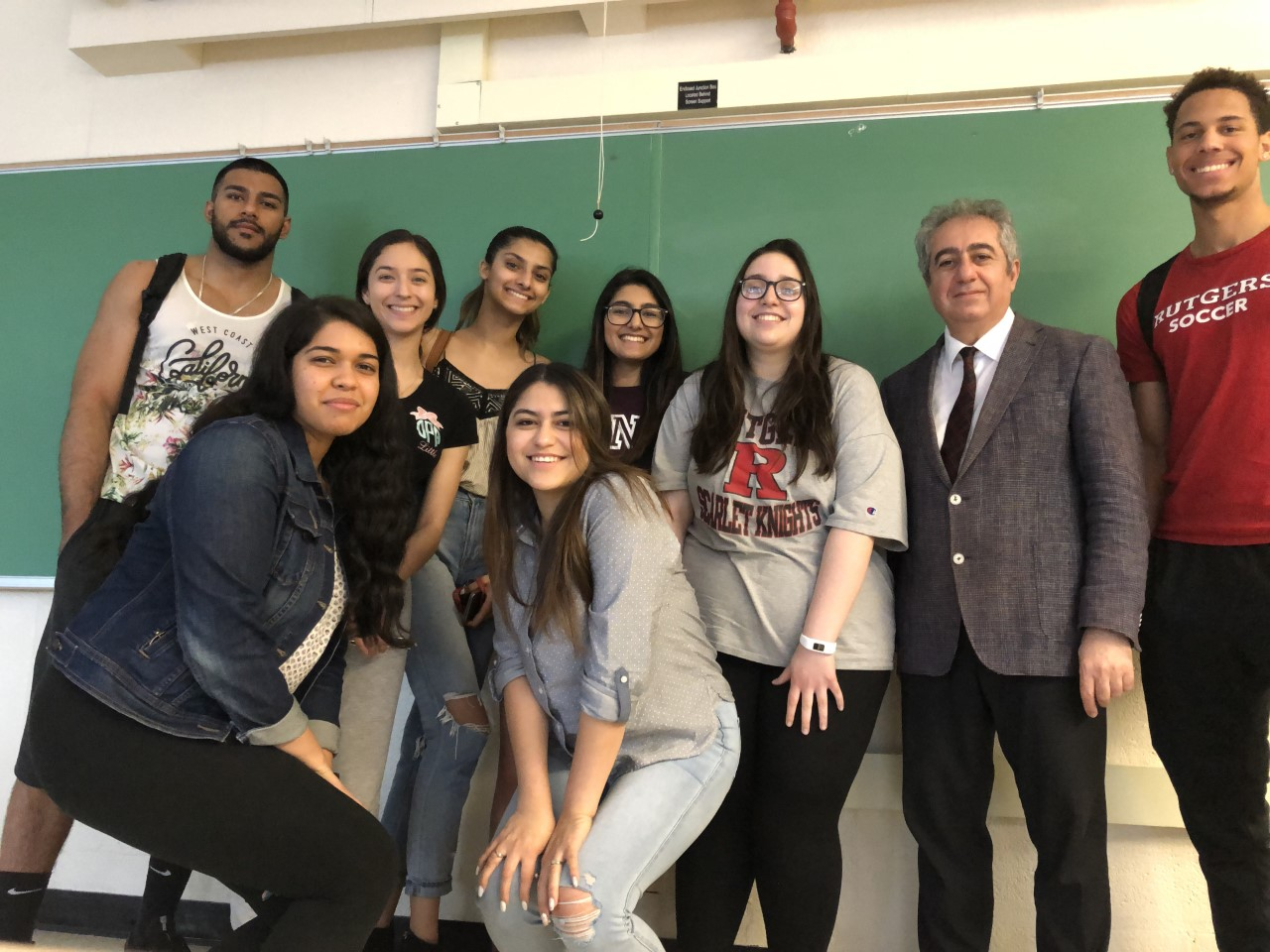
Dr. Gubad Ibadoghlu with his students at Rutgers University.

Dr. Gubad has been NED Reagan–Fascell Democracy fellow since 2015, researching "the Political Economy of Natural Resources in the Caspian Basin Countries: Challenges for Transitions to Democracy". Furthermore, Dr. Gubad was a fellow at Prague Civil Society in 2018, researching Azerbaijani corruption and analyzing money laundering. Ibadoghlu's work was partly about analysis of the rise and prevalence of corruption in Azerbaijan and other post-Soviet countries to the fact that their exports are dominated by oil and gas. He wrote opinion pieces and reports on lack of economic transparency, financial accountability, and dysfunctional economic models implemented by the authorities of extractive industry in the region. Gubad Ibadoghlu has also published more than twenty books in the area of politics on natural resources and revenue management. He focused on good governance and "petro-authoritarianism", alternative energy, analyzing how oil and gas revenues have fueled corruption and authoritarianism in post-Soviet states. He is paying specific attention to the political effects of natural resources in the Caspian Sea Basin regions, including Azerbaijan, Kazakhstan, and Russia.

He published research regarding the effects of COVID-19 on policy making in Azerbaijan during and after the pandemic and the effects of the second Karabakh war.

In his recent lengthy article published in the Resources Policy, Ibadoghlu argued that, based on the empirical findings, "the oil-hinders-democracy hypothesis is valid for the oil-rich nations of the post-Soviet space." The paper focused on several resource-rich countries, including Azerbaijan.

Most recently, Dr. Gubad published a number of articles focusing on the EU oil and gas deal; Dr. Gubad warned about the misrepresented data from Azerbaijan regarding oil and especially gas. Dr. Gubad argued that gas would be provided from Russia and Turkmenistan sources, and with further continuation of the deal, human rights in Azerbaijan will be eradicated.

Ibadoghlu on multiple occasions criticized the Azerbaijani president Ilham Aliyev, the political regime and the corruption that exists within the state institutions of Azerbaijan.

=== Anti-corruption work ===
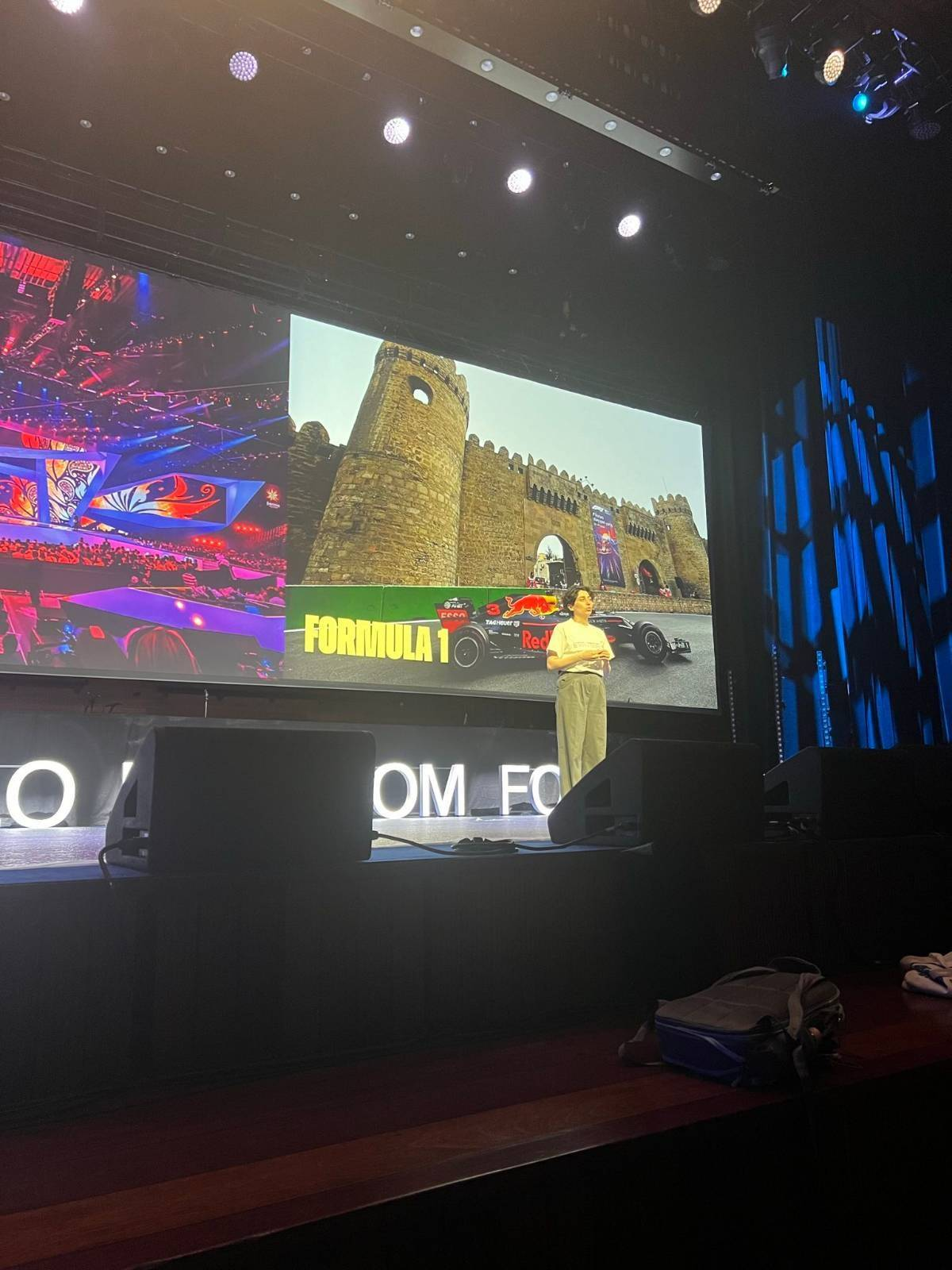
Zhala Bayramova, Dr Gubad Ibadoghlu's child, is presenting his case at Oslo Freedom Forum in June 2024.

In his many engagements and roles over the years Dr Gubad Ibadoghlu has worked towards bringing light to the low transparency and accountability that exists within the higher echelons of the Azerbaijani government. He published papers discussing how many of the large scale international events in Azerbaijan, such as Formula One races, are organized by companies owned by relatives of the state officials and how this leads to large scale misappropriation of funds.

Dr Gubad Ibadoghlu has been a steadfast voice against Azerbaijan's corruption. As a board member of the Extractive Industries Transparency Initiative (EITI) from 2013 to 2019, he staunchly advocated for transparency, even in the face of government pressure. His refusal to comply with government regulations led to his summoning to the prosecutor office and the levying of ongoing criminal charges against his NGO from 2015.

He is a member of the Working Groups on "Grand Corruption and State Capture" and "Asset Stolen Recovery" of the UNCAC Coalition—Association for the Implementation of the UN Convention against Corruption and a local expert in the Anti-Corruption Network for Eastern Europe and Central Asia of the Istanbul Anti-Corruption Action Plan (IAP) 5th Round of the Monitoring Assessment Framework of the OECD.

He founded in June an organization in the United Kingdom, Azerbaijani Youth Educational Foundation, to support Azerbaijani youth abroad, to be funded by donations and assets confiscated from corrupt Azerbaijani elites abroad, such as those partially recovered by the UK in the "Azerbaijani Laundromat" anti-corruption case, a high-profile case involving the laundering of billions of dollars from Azerbaijan.

In his 2022 paper discussing SOCAR, Dr Gubad has criticized the company for nepotism, lack of financial transparency and ineffective leadership, which is appointed by the president Aliyev himself. According to Dr Gubad these factors lead to growing debts of SOCAR. In the same paper he states that due to the lack of any legislative framework the government can allocate as much money to SOCAR as it wishes and take as much money as it wishes, allowing for numerous quasi-fiscal expenditures in sports and media.

Dr Ibadoghlu has extensively documented the corruption and abuses within among the Azerbaijani elites. In several papers published in the years preceding his arrest he investigated the appropriation of the agricultural land in Karabakh following Second Karabakh War. He discovered that the ability to use these lands was exclusive to the president's Aliyev close circle of allies and relatives and their companies. In another paper on a similar topic he discusses how these companies, while being monopolies, are also given subsidies and benefits from the state budget, thus exacerbating the extent of corruption.

=== Civil rights activism ===
Ibadoghlu has previously worked at the Economic Research Center, a Baku-based think tank promoting good governance in Azerbaijan, and served in the Steering Committee of the EU Eastern Partnership's Civil Society Forum (2011-2012) as one of founding members, as well as a civil society's representative to the international board of the Extractive Industries Transparency Initiative (EITI) for 2013–2019. He continues to cooperate with the Eastern Partnership' Civil Society Forum on a number of topics and has been a contributor to the Eastern Partnership Index for a number of years. He also served as a member of the steering committee at Black Sea NGO Forum, a member of Strategy Advisor Group at Publish What You Pay International Coalition (PWYP), of which he is also a founding member. Currently, he is a member of the Advisory Board of the CAREC Think Tank Network, chairman of the Board of Azerbaijan Think Tank Alliance (ATTA), a member of Working Groups on "Grand Corruption and State Capture" and "Asset Stolen Recovery" of the UNCAC Coalition – Association for the Implementation of the UN Convention against Corruption and local expert in Anti-Corruption Network for Eastern Europe and Central Asia of the Istanbul Anti-Corruption Action Plan (IAP) 5th Round of Monitoring Assessment Framework of the OECD. He conducted research for UNICEF, World Bank, Oxfam GB, OSF, EU, GIZ, USAID, UNDP, WB, OSCE, NRGİ, OSI and Asian Development Bank.

Dr. Gubad Ibadoghlu was fired from Azerbaijan State University of Economics for his civil rights activism in 2019, where he worked as a lecturer until 2014 and continued to collaborate remotely until 2019.

Dr. Gubad has been a research team leader for USAID and Transparency International's Azerbaijan funding project on "Partnership for Transparency" from February 2013 to February 2016. He worked as International Consultant in the World Bank and IETI projects from December 2015 to January 2016 and projects of USAID and UNDP from January 2014 to May 2015 in Kyrgyzstan. Dr. Gubad was also a researcher at the EU funding project "The effective system of public finances control (PFC)" from July 2012 to April 2014. He is one of the commentators for IMF's Article 4 reports on Azerbaijan and has represented and given speeches on the situation of Azerbaijani civil society in World Bank, EBRD, and IMF Annual Meetings.

NGO crackdown in Azerbaijan started in mid-2012, and many NGOs decided to protest the actions of the Azerbaijani government. On 17 December 2013, Dr. Gubad organized a protest in front of the presidential administration and submitted the protest statement from the civil society. In August 2014, in conjunction with the investigation into international donors and their grantees, the authorities froze the bank accounts of the Economic Research Centre (ERC) and its director, Gubad Ibadoghlu.

The government's refusal to register a grant the ERC received in 2014 paralyzed the organization's work. Ibadoghlu told Human Rights Watch that he has twice attempted to register the grant, but that the Ministry of Justice refused, claiming that a requirement of the grant contract signed with the donor—that unused portions of the grant should be returned to the donor—was not consistent with Azerbaijani legislation.

However, the government also did not allow the grant to be returned and started criminal investigation against Dr. Gubad and ERC under falsified charges of the unpaid tax. The unpaid tax penalty poses further threats to the ERC and Ibadoghlu as ERC director. The penalty was able to sentence him for two to seven years' imprisonment. Therefore Dr. Gubad has been in exile since 2015 January and is member of New University in Exile Consortium.

On 16 February, ECtHR ruling recognized the violation of Article 1 of Protocol No. 1 in regards to freezing Dr. Gubad and ERC's bank account in the case of Imranova and others v. Azerbaijan, application no. 74254/14 and 74299/14. Later on 23 February 2023, ECtHR ruled that preventing Dr. Gubad Ibadoghlu from registering the Public Initiative Center, another NGO focusing on civil rights, is a violation of Article 11 in the case of Bayramov and Imanov v. Azerbaijan, application no. 79522/13.

=== Government criticism ===
Dr. Gubad is one of the reporters for the World Bank, EBRD and other banks that provide loans for Azerbaijan. Various banks rely on his input regarding the Azerbaijani economy granting of loans to Azerbaijan. In 2023, Ilham Aliyev made a public speech about Dr. Gubad, saying: "So-called economics experts, who are cockcrowing from abroad and domestically, open your eyes wide, and keep your rat-trap shut into stomach!"

In 2001-2011, Dr. Gubad published a report of Azerbaijan's customs that proved that goods worth 11 billion dollars were imported into the country illegally, without state registration and without paying any taxes and duties to the budget.

Azerbaijani independent media relies on Dr. Gubad's criticism and analysis of Azerbaijan corruption. Recently, Dr. Gubad has been analyzing and reporting on corruption and embezzlement in Nagorno-Karabakh, confirming the nepotism business connections of Aliyev and Erdogan. Dr. Gubad criticized the Azerbaijani government and official agencies and ministries for money laundering, corruption, embezzlement, exploitation of labor, fraud, extortion, and graft.

Shortly before his arrest, Ibadoghlu planned to publish research into Azerbaijani spending in and around Nagorno-Karabakh. Research includes Aliyev's and his family-owned business and other Azerbaijani elites business in Nagorno-Karabakh. Dr Gubad Ibadoghlu had also previously sought to expose the Aliyev family's extensive property empire in London, which he filmed on his YouTube channel. It is stated that Gubad Ibadoglu's series of articles about corruption and embezzlement in Nagorno-Kabarakh and his speeches on "BİZ.tv" also played a role in his arrest.

=== Environmental activism ===
Dr. Gubad has been a member of EITI and worked closely with Crude Accountability, authoring many reports on Azerbaijan's policy covering the environmental impact of poor governance in oil and gas industry. His membership in the EITI board and his work regarding oil and gas was one of the reasons for his dismissal from the Azerbaijan State University of Economics in 2019. Ibadoghlu's arrest in July 2023 came soon after he published an article where he criticized the Azerbaijani oil and gas industry.

=== Journalism ===
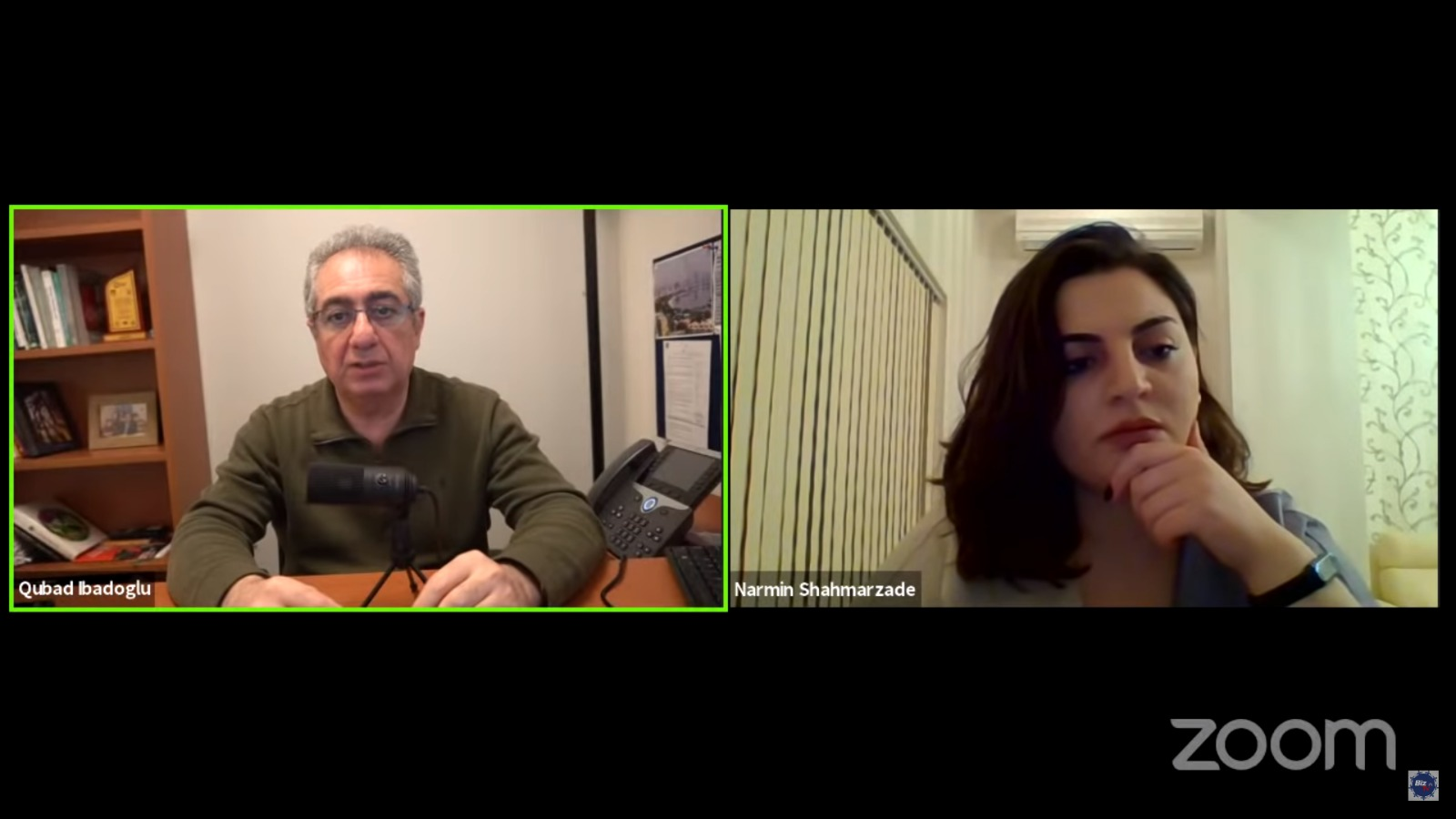
Dr. Gubad's daily show with feminist activist Narmin Shahmarzade on "Why is public response and civic engagement weak?

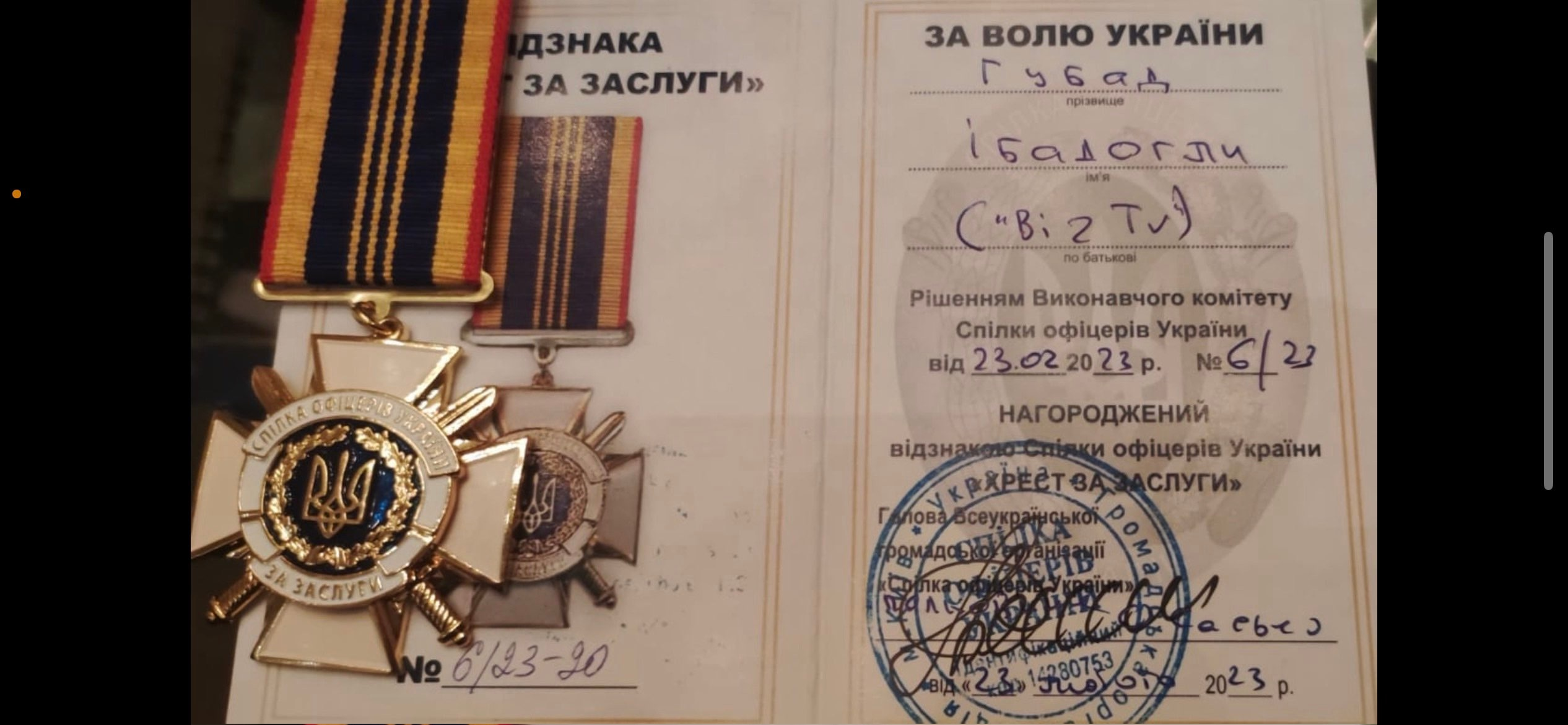
Gubad Ibadoghlu received recognition from Ukraine for his journalisitc work on BIZ TV channel for his coverage of the Russian invasion of Ukraine.

In 1995-1999, Dr. Gubad was the editor-in-chief of the economic newspaper "Ekonomiks", and since January 2000 until January 2015, he had been the editor-in-chief of the scientific-economic magazine "Ekspert". Dr. Gubad was also an editor-chief and head of the economy department of Manat+ and Millət(The Nation) newspapers. After the NGO crackdown, Expert magazine was shut down as well as the others. Until his detention, he was running economy and politics daily shows at BIZ TV YouTube channel. Dr. Gubad was doing daily reviews and shows of explaining various economy and politics related to Azerbaijan and was also interviewing guests on these topics. Recent topics covered by BIZ TV were "corruption in Nagorno-Karabakh", "detention conditions of Bakhtiyar Hajiyev", "War in Ukraine", "Increased Repression in the country" and political, social and economic rights.

=== Public initiatives ===
In June 2023, Ibadoghlu established the Azerbaijani Youth Education Foundation in the UK, with two other Azerbaijani opposition politicians, Jamil Hasanli and Arif Mammadov, to support higher education for young Azerbaijanis, place them in universities abroad, and foster a new generation of professionals "for Azerbaijan's future." He stated on Facebook that the foundation would be funded by donations and also by foreign assets confiscated from corrupt Azerbaijani elites abroad.

=== Political career ===
Gubad Ibadoghlu, established the Azerbaijan Democracy and Prosperity Movement in 2014 with a democratic platform, that has been arbitrarily denied registration six times as a political party by the Azerbaijani authorities. It was a relatively small movement and was only focused on democracy matters.

Despite numerous appeals to the Ministry of Justice, the party failed to obtain state registration. According to the Article 4.7 of t the "Law on Political Parties" adopted in January 11, 2023, parties cannot operate without official registration.

Gubad Ibadoghlu has mostly lived in exile. According to reports in the recent years, Ibadoghlu had traveled to Azerbaijan primarily to tend to a parent.

== Detention ==
On July 23, 2023, around 1 pm, Gubad Ibadoghlu and his wife, Irada Bayramova, were stopped by 4-6 civilian cars and kidnapped. The cars surrounded Mr. Gubad's car, forcing it into a traffic accident by ramming it from the rear and front. Around 20 people in civilian clothes came out of the cars, forcing Mr. Gubad and Mrs Irada out of the car. The attackers proceeded to physically assault Mr. Gubad and Mrs. Irada, resulting in severe bruises on their bodies. The attackers also punched Ms. Irada in the head. Mrs. Bayramova has bruises all over her body, bumps on her head, concussion, and suffers from PTSD. Mrs. Bayramova was pressed down to the floor by eight policemen. Dr. Gubad was beaten in police custody. Moreover, the operatives who arrested him continued to insult him. The lawyer was not allowed to examine his body for torture traces.

They were taken to Main Directorate for Combating Organized Crime (MDCOC). They were kept in separate rooms, and Mr. Gubad was denied access to his lawyer until around 5 pm on July 23, 2023.

Ministry of Internal Affairs stated that Irada Bayramova was not detained and was not with Dr.Gubad. Irada Bayramova filed a complaint against ill-treatment she received and gave interview showing her injures.

No charges were brought against Dr. Gubad during the search and seizure. He was brutally detained as a witness so that Dr. Gubad won't have any legal protection.

The next day, after the search, initial accusation was brought up against Gubad Ibadoghlu. The charges were more severe the next day by adding an aggravating factor. The accusation article was changed to 204.3.1: "the preparation, acquisition or sale of counterfeit money or securities by an organized group" and he faced up to twelve years in prison.

On July 24 2023, the Narimanov District Court decided on 3 months and 26 days of preventive detention, and he was transported to the detention center. The district court decided on preventive detention without any justification.

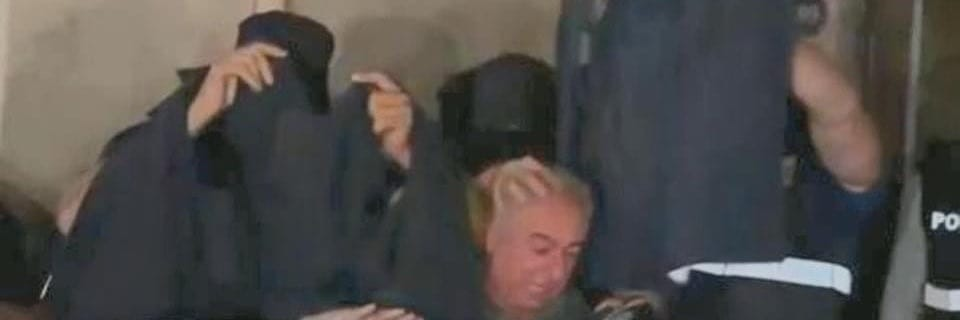
The detention of Dr. Gubad Ibadoghlu after the illegal search of the office. As of September 2023, this is last available photo of him.

The police planted 40000 US dollars into Dr Gubad's old office. The search was conducted illegally. The place had been used by him eight years ago as an office for the Economic Research Center. The office was no longer used since Dr. Gubad resided outside Azerbaijan for 8 years and the apartment did not belong to him. In the morning of July 23, the current office manager attempted to enter the office but found the locks to be changed. When transporting Mr. Gubad from the office to the police car, police covered his head with a black veil and he stated that his arrest was personally ordered by President Ilham Aliyev.

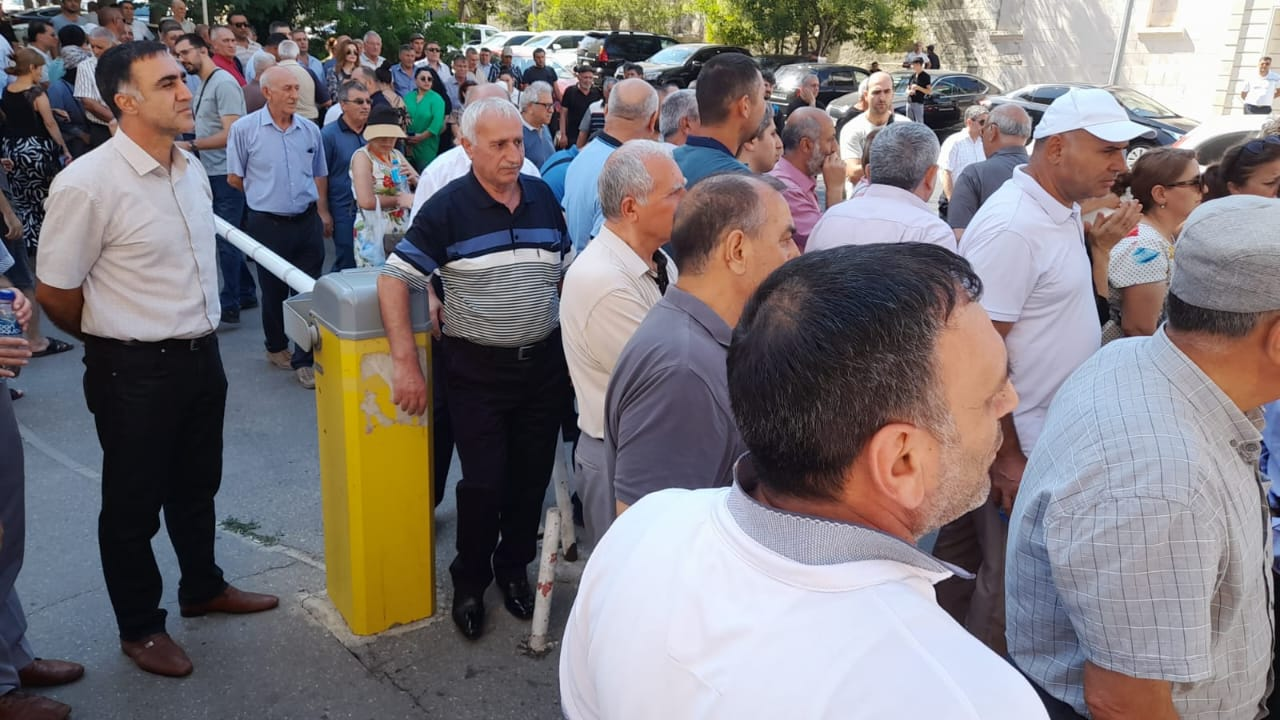
For every court hearing involving Dr. Gubad people have been gathering in front of the court building in support of him.

On 25 August 2023, after many senators and congressmen endorsed support for Dr. Gubad, to decrease the international support, he was charged under Art. 167-3.1 (Production, storage or distribution of religious extremist materials). Dr. Gubad's eldest child, Zhala Bayramova and his lawyers stated that, Allegedly, PDF versions of about 50 books of Fethullah Gülen have been found. The books was inside documents and computers. None of the computers belong to Dr. Gubad Ibadoghlu and never been used by him, and the seized documents and books were not reflected in the protocol. In this case, the prosecutor office added Gülen material themselves. Charges related to Gülen and Islamic extremism has been used to decrease international support, him being atheist and LGBT supporter has been used to decrease local support. When the police raided their home to gather evidence for the prosecution they found Dr. Gubad's wine and liquor collection, but did not add it as an evidence. The Azerbaijani Interior Ministry told media that he had been identified by Anar Aliyev, one of the four people detained earlier, as a member of FETÖ. Dr. Gubad states that he has no connection to FETÖ or any religious group and he is not a believer or religious person.

According to Washington Post, the actual reason for his detention is more likely related to events in June 2023, when he helped to found the Azerbaijani Youth Educational Foundation in the UK, aimed at preparing a new generation of Azerbaijani professionals. This thought is shared by many critics. "This issue - treasures that were taken out of the country and their security - is the most sensitive, most taboo topic for the government," one education expert, Rashad Aliyev, wrote, alleging that Ibadoglu's intention to work toward the confiscation of these funds was the sole reason for his arrest.

=== Smear campaign ===
Since July 14 2023, there has been a lot of news by state-affiliated Azerbaijani media about Gubad Ibadoghlu and his alleged link to FETÖ. From July 21 until his arrest on July 23, 2023, the state-owned media outlets reported that Gubad Ibadoghlu was arrested on FETÖ-related charges. Even though the official investigation and the court decisions have not made a mention of the FETÖ connection.

The government media publishes articles trying link Dr. Gubad to FETÖ, Soros Foundation, atheism, LGBTQIA+ rights, implying that he is an Iranian spy and that he has extensive connections to the Armenian diaspora. Those articles are either written by anonymous authors or Azerbaijani state officials themselves.

=== Health and ill-treatment in detention center ===
Dr. Gubad's health has been rapidly declining while in jail and he is being denied access to medical care despite a serious pre-existing heart condition. According to Archway Medical Center, Dr. Gubad is under risk of heart diseases, kidney diseases, stroke and peripheral vein diseases. According to his family, Dr. Gubad's had aortic dilation of up to 4,1 mm, which means an increased risk of rupture of the main blood vessel. He has developed sediment in his gallbladder, hypertrophy and diastolic dysfunction were detected in the left ventricle of the heart, a swelling near the thyroid gland (goiter), had fluctuating blood pressure and blood sugar levels, lost 10 kg in first week, and 15 kg in less than a month. Dr. Gubad's brother Galib Bayramov stated that, he is subjected to torture in the detention center, which worsens his nervous condition. The light is not turned off at night in his cell room, Ibadoghlu cannot sleep properly, which exacerbates his illnesses, his blood sugar level does not decrease, his blood pressure does not drop, his pulse remains high. The nervous stress caused by the arrest and trans-national aggression has led to aggravation of thyroid goiter, kidney and other organ problems, and the vision in his left eye has also deteriorated. He is confined to a crowded, inadequately ventilated cell, exacerbating his blood pressure concerns and posing grave risks to someone with an aortic aneurysm. The elevated blood sugar levels reported by prison medical personnel have triggered adverse kidney changes, compounded by visual impairment. Factors such as his mental state, inactivity, unsanitary conditions, and constant psychological pressure have hindered any improvement of his well-being. On 23 September 2023 his blood sugar level was measured to be 278 mg/dl, and the day after it was 374 mg/dl, while the reference value for the upper limit of satiety blood sugar level is 140 mg/dl.

Gubad Ibadoghlu's detention was extended several times since his arrest and as a result his health was reportedly deteriorating further. According to his family, he has developed peripheral polyneuropathy as his blood sugar has been continuously 2-3 times higher than normal throughout the last 8 months. This affects his kidneys, liver and his arteries, that have been getting clogged. His right to daily walks has not been guaranteed; he is not allowed to leave his cell and he is still refused transfer to the hospital.

He feels like his fellow inmates, who are convicted of serious crimes, are spying on him, leaving him isolated and unable to seek help for his basic needs. Dr. Gubad is treated worse than other cellmates and the room lacks natural light sources, drinkable water and ventilation.

Detention center refuses to provide him with medications, therefore, Dr. Gubad's family has to find unconventional ways to deliver the needed medications.

Gubad Ibadoglu's lawyer sent 21 requests to the Ministry of Justice to get medical documents related to the results of her client's examination. However, the results of his examinations and tests were not presented to the lawyer for a long time - the lawyer's requests were either rejected or not answered at all. Health documents prepared for submission to the European Court of Human Rights were falsified and only given to the lawyer after ECtHR ruled in favor of interim measurements.

According to openDemocracy, this is a known tactic employed by the Azerbaijani government. Azerbaijani government release the political prisoners like Ibadoghlu in such a bad condition that they have no ability left to criticize the government.

ICRC Baku office was denied 3 times to see and examine Dr. Gubad by the detention center. Now the ICRC has appealed directly to the Penitentiary Service.

ECtHR, in line with Regulation 39 of the Rules of Court, has taken temporary interim measures due rapidly declining Dr. Gubad's health. The ECtHR ordered the Azerbaijani government to take urgent measures to ensure the protection of Ibadoghlu's health and inform the Strasbourg Court about this.

Dr. Gubad's relatives also stated that clean water, food and cleaning products are either not allowed or rationed by weight for him.

The phone list of his lawyers was taken away from Dr. Gubad Ibadoghlu by the detention center, although the accused has the right to contact lawyers at any time. Professor Gubad Ibadoglu is informed that the delivery of documents, including the government's response to ECtHR, letters, and books is prohibited.

=== Transnational aggression against Dr. Gubad's family. ===
The deputy head of the detention center, Ahad Abdiyev demanded from Dr. Gubad the phone numbers and address of his children living abroad and threatened to deprive Dr. Gubad of the opportunity to talk on the phone if he does not provide them.

Dr. Gubad's brother and cousin have been prohibited from leaving the country without any court decision or legal base. The ban has been also imposed on relatives who do not bear the surname "Bayramov".

On 19 August 2023, Dr. Gubad's son, Emin Bayramli's room in shared apartment was ransacked. They did not touch the belongings of his fellow roommates in other rooms. Thieves only searched Emin's closet and bed, destroyed his belongings and clothes. They did not steal the TV or any other movable valuables from the house. Thieves took only Emin's bag. In that bag, there were Emin and Dr. Gubad's documents, such as ID, visa copies and bank statements. The incident is under investigation. On 8 September, personal photos of Zhala Bayramova were leaked to the internet. According to Bayramova, they confiscated their old phone and leaked the pictures from there. Zhala Bayramova is also under constant harassment and smear campaign because of their position as peace activist in Nagorno-Karabakh war.

=== House arrest ===
On April 22, 2024 Gubad Ibadoghlu was released from detention and moved to house arrest. Under the conditions of the house arrest he was not allowed to leave Baku. After the transfer to house arrest he underwent medical assessment revealing that he was in urgent need of heart surgery. The examination revealed that his aortic root expanded to 5.2 cm while in detention, well above the normal size.

Shortly after TU Dresden published a statement urging the Azerbaijani government to release him and allow him to travel to Germany in order to start his university position.

=== Reactions to the arrest ===
==== Initial reactions ====
Human Rights Watch has stated that "Ibadoghlu's detention falls squarely in a longstanding pattern of pursuing dubious charges against government critics in Azerbaijan". The U.S. State Department has said it is "closely following" the arrest. The EU spokeswoman on Twitter said that the "EU is following closely developments related to the arrest of renowned scholar and activist Gubad Ibadoghlu. We call on [Azerbaijan] to ensure his access to medication, to swiftly release him, and to respect his rights, including his right to due process." The embassies of the UK, France, the US and Germany have made a joint statement soon after the arrest, urging the respect for Gubad Ibadoghlu's rights, access to medication and fair legal process. MEP Viola von Cramon has stated on Twitter: "Aliyev brutally persecutes any critical voice in Azerbaijan, who exposed the regime's corruption, Gubad Ibadoghlu is its latest victim. He was arrested on false charges, assaulted, denied medical care. This regime is not a trustworthy partner of the EU."

Former US Ambassador to Azerbaijan, Richard D. Kauzlarich stated that the United States must take the lead in showing there are consequences for continued violations of human rights and apply sanctions to Azerbaijani officials responsible of Dr. Gubad's illegal arrest and continued detention.

==== United States ====
US Congressmen Bill Keating, Tom Kean and Gerry Connolly made a joint statement calling on the Azerbaijani government to respect his rights and ensure access to medicine and a fair trial for Ibadoghlu, citing his health condition. US Representative Frank Pallone has also made a statement calling the State Department to secure the release of Gubad Ibadoghlu.

US Senators Marco Rubio and Ben Cardin have called for Ibadoghlu immediate release, citing baseless criminal charges and lack of medical care provided to Gubad Ibadoghlu. US Senator Bob Menendez has issued a statement from the Senate Foreign Relations Committee calling for Gubad Ibadoghlu's release as well. US Senator Chris Van Hollen called for pressuring "Pres. Aliyev to stop cracking down on political dissidents & to free political prisoners like economist Gubad Ibadoghlu — and also to end the blockade of Nagorno-Karabakh". On 14 September 2023, Senator Ben Cardin and Senator Tim Caine have brought up the case of Dr. Gubad at the Senate Foreign Relations Committee hearing.

Tom Lantos Human Rights Commission is monitoring Gubad Ibadoghlu's case with Freedom Now as its partner and Chris Smith as an advocate for Gubad Ibadoghlu.

On 14 September 2023 the US State Department made a statement urging the Azerbaijani government to immediately release Gubad Ibadoghlu. At another press conference in October, the Spokesperson for the US State Department reaffirmed that the US continues to be concerned about the reports about Gubad Ibadoghlu's health and stated that the US urged the Azerbaijani government to release him on a number of occasions.

On February 14 2024 a resolution demanding the immediate release and condemning the detention of Dr Gubad Ibadoghlu was introduced in the US House of Representatives. A similar resolution was introduced the next month in the Senate as well. Both resolutions have bipartisan support among their cosponsors.

On Gubad Ibadoghlu's birthday on September 12 2024, US Senators Ben Cardin and Chris Van Hollen once again called on the Azerbaijani government to release Dr Gubad.

One week before the COP29 UN Climate Conference in Baku, a bipartisan group of US congresspeople have signed a letter to the US Secretary of State Antony Blinken urging him to act ahead of the conference to secure the release of Dr Gubad Ibadoghlu.

==== United Kingdom ====
Jeremy Corbyn stated during a discussion in the UK parliament: "[Dr. Gubad Ibadoghlu] is a distinguished academic, proud of academic independence and the objectivity of his work and studies. He will not be intimidated by anybody regarding what he writes or how he writes it. He is in a difficult situation at the moment, and I would be grateful if the Minister could assure us that the British Government will do all they can to ensure that he gets the medical support and attention he needs, as well as to ensure his right to pursue his profession and live in peace".

A motion at the UK parliament was submitted and signed by 10 MPs, condemning Gubad Ibadoghlu's detention and urging his release.

MP Margaret Hodge wrote a letter to the Foreign Secretary David Cameron urging him to "consider using all tools at his disposal, including Human Rights and Corruption Sanctions, against those who are detaining Gubad Ibadoghlu in inhumane conditions and preventing his access to a fair trial".

==== European Union ====
German MPs Kassem Taher Saleh and Robin Wagener have expressed support for his case.

PACE rapporteur has called on Azerbaijani government "to drop politically motivated charges and secure his immediate release" European Parliament Committee on Foreign Affairs and UN Human Rights office also made a statement urging his immediate release.

On 14 September 2023, European Parliament adopted a resolution (voting: 539 for, 6 against and 24 abstentions), demanding Gubad Ibadoghlu's "immediate and unconditional release" and called for "EU sanctions under the EU Global Human Rights Sanctions Regime to be imposed on Azerbaijani officials who have committed serious human rights violations".

On April 25, 2024, shortly after Dr Gubad Ibadoghlu was moved to house arrest, the European Parliament adopted a second resolution demanding the unconditional release of journalists and activists in Azerbaijan as well as urging the Azerbaijani government to ensure his access to healthcare.

A group of French delegation of the S&D group in the European Parliament signed a joint statement in September 2024 in support of Dr Gubad Ibadoghlu and all the political prisoners in Azerbaijan, calling for their immediate release.

A question was submitted at the Swedish Riksdag to the Minister of Foreign Affairs by MP Håkan Svenneling regarding the case of Gubad Ibadoghlu. The minister confirmed that Swedish representatives are in contact with the Dr. Gubad's family members and expressed concern about his worsening health condition. A similar question to Swedish MFA Tobias Billström was brought up again in February 2024 by MP Erik Hellsborn. The minister stated that the matter was brought up to the Azerbaijani authorities through the Swedish embassy. Additionally he stated that he brought up the case to the Azerbaijani Minister of Foreign Affairs during the OSCE meeting in November 2023 where Tobias Billström stressed the importance of providing the adequate medical care to Dr Gubad Ibadoghlu.

==== Azerbaijan ====
Civil society activists and opposition politicians of Azerbaijan condemned the persecution by the authorities of Dr. Gubad. The criminal prosecution of Gubad Ibadoglu is of a political nature, according to Rufat Safarov, director of the human rights organization "Line of Defense". Chairman of the Party of People's Front of Azerbaijan (PPFA) Ali Kerimli also believes that the arrest of the famous politician and scientist Ibadoglu is "an act of political repression". Jamil Hasanli, Chairman of the National Council of Democratic Forces, called Ibadoglu's arrest a "shameful step by the regime." Various Feminist Movement and LGBTQIA+ activists also condemn Dr. Gubad arrest and considers it politically motivated. On 6 August, a protest on the central square of Strasbourg - Kleber was held by Azerbaijani asylum seekers demanding the release of Dr. Gubad Ibadoghlu. A large group of representatives of the creative and scientific intelligentsia, civil society, the media and legal community of Azerbaijan appealed to President Ilham Aliyev with a request to assist in the release of economist Gubad Ibadoghlu.

The Public Council of Talyshs of Azerbaijan (OST) strongly condemned the arrest.

==== Other reactions ====
Amnesty International started urgent action demanding Ibadoghlu's release, citing his deteriorating health and inhumane conditions of his prison cell. "He is held in a small cell with five other men, relying on tap water that is not safe to drink and prison food which is not adapted for his diabetes and other health conditions. His medical conditions include heart disease, type 2 diabetes, kidney diseases, jugular vein distention, stomach ulcers and severe lower back pain, and his health conditions are fast deteriorating. He is given his medication on an irregular schedule which increases his risk of a stroke and of developing further heart disease and other life-threatening conditions" - Amnesty International wrote in their statement.

OMCT has called for respecting his rights citing his deteriorating health, prison cell conditions as well as obstacles faced by Gubad Ibadoghlu in accessing his lawyer. Many non-governmental organizations and international organizations have called for Gubad Ibadoghlu's release, including Human Rights Foundation, Publish What You Pay, World Movement for Democracy, Natural Resource Governance Institute, Freedom House, Institute for Reporters' Freedom and Safety, Scholars at Risk, Norwegian Helsinki Committee, Freedom Now, Extractive Industries Transparency Initiative, The New University in Exile Consortium, Eastern Partnership Civil Society Forum and Crude Accountability, Rights to All, Amnesty Germany, IPRF, Amnesty Hungary, Freie Universität Berlin, Southern Africa Resource Watch, Open Government Partnership.

Political immigrants in Germany have started a 10-day protest in front of the Ministry of Foreign Affairs of Germany to advocate for the release of Dr. Gubad Ibadoghlu and political prisoners in Azerbaijan. The action started on August 20.

Crude Accountability performed an intervention at OSCE Warsaw Human Dimension Conference 2023, one of the largest human rights conferences in the region, demanding unconditional release of Dr. Gubad Ibadoghlu.

As a reaction to his arrest, there have been further public statements from academic institutions. Among others, the Center for Slavic, Eurasian, and East European Studies (CSEEES) at the University of North Carolina and Rutgers Unviversity have called on authorities in Azerbaijan to release Ibadoghlu.

The rector of TU Dresden, where Dr. Gubad was supposed to start working in the fall 2023, sent a letter to Ilham Aliyev regarding Dr Gubad's arrest and calling for his release from detention.

The New York City Bar Association published a statement in support of Dr Gubad. Apart from the calls for immediate and unconditional release as well as access to healthcare, it was also noted that all of the complaints filed by Gubad Ibadoghlu were summarily denied by the Azerbaijani courts. It also called on the United Nations Special Rapporteur on Human Rights Defenders to urge the government of Azerbaijan to renew their commitment to he UN Declaration on Human Rights Defenders.

The chair of the EITI board Helen Clark made a statement citing Dr Gubad's work in the EITI board and his contribution to the global movement to promote accountability in the extractive sector. She stated that she wrote to President Aliyev urging his administration to immediately release Dr. Gubad Ibadoghlu and enable him access to medical care.

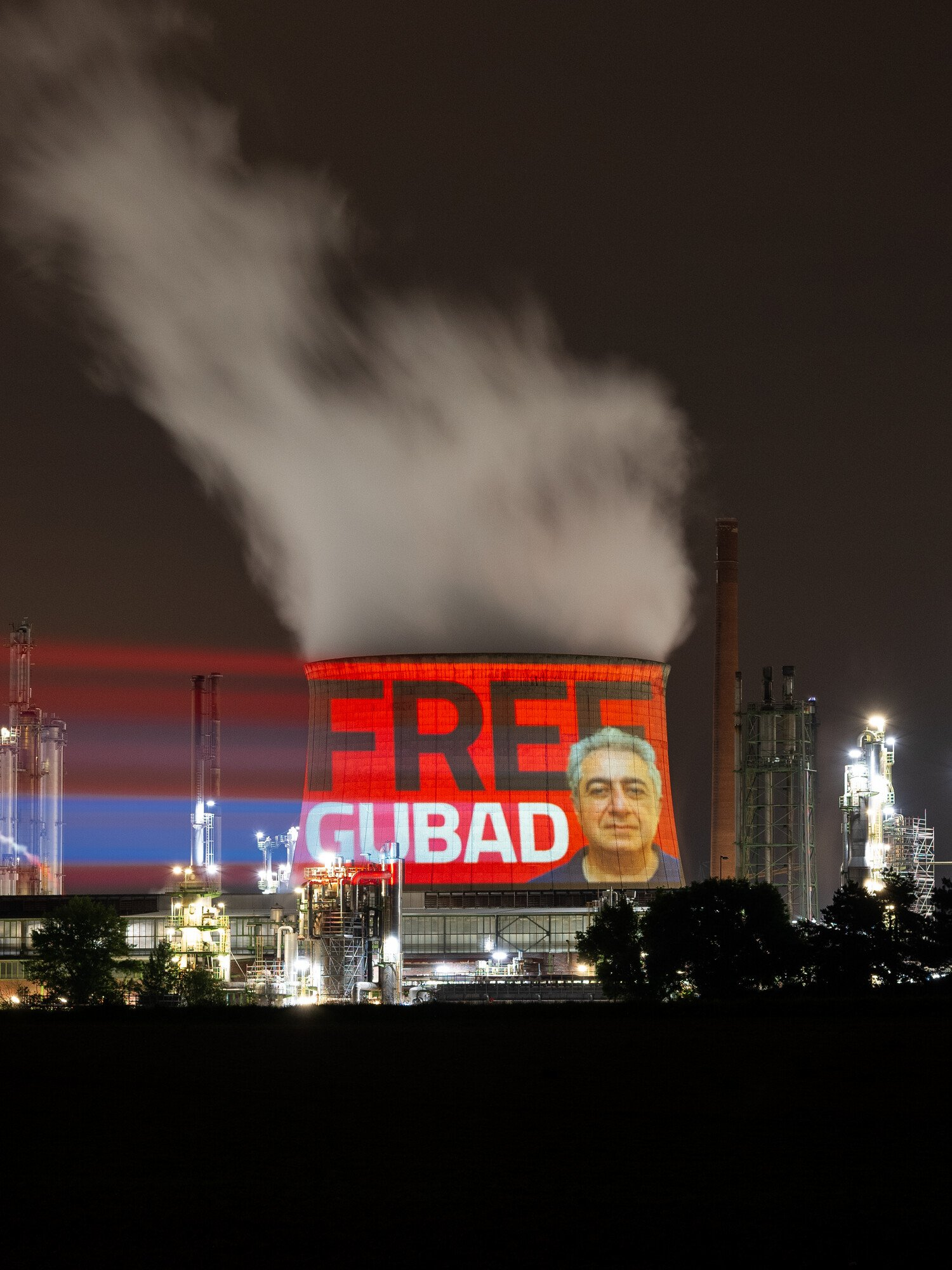
Dr Gubad Ibadoghlu's image was projected onto a power plant in Bonn, Germany in June 2024 during the Bonn Climate Conference in an effort to draw the attendees' attention to his case.

The UN Special Rapporteur on Human Rights Defenders, Mary Lawlor, made an official statement in December 2023, noting Dr. Gubad Ibadoghlu's deteriorating health and raising a concern as to why other alternatives such as house arrest were not considered in this case.

OCCRP has done an investigation about human rights and corruption in Azerbaijan, including the description of treatment of Gubad Ibadoghlu in the detention center and the detention and torture of journalists from Abzas Media.

During the Bonn Climate Change Conference, Global Witness projected an images of Dr Gubad Ibadoghlu onto prominent buildings at the Bonn conference, calling on the Azerbaijani regime to release him.

In November 2024, Amnesty International launched another urgent action calling for Dr Gubad Ibadoghlu's release and allowing him access to medical attention.

=== Media Coverage ===
Several articles were published by the Washington Post, the Guardian, Reuters, Bild and Al Jazeera, discussing the case of Gubad Ibadoghlu as well as the larger picture of human rights abuses in Azerbaijan. The article in Reuters, written in the wake of Azerbaijan being chosen as a host of COP29 in 2024, particularly emphasized that such a decision gives legitimacy to the actions of its government and serves as a distraction from an abysmal human rights record that includes the arrest and inhumane treatment of Dr. Gubad Ibadoghlu. The article in the Washington Post discussed the overarching wave of crackdowns on journalists and civil activists in Azerbaijan that started with the arrest of Gubad Ibadoghlu in July 2023 and is still ongoing. Journalists in various media outlets such as Kanal 13 and Abzas Media were targeted with bogus charges as well and remain in jail similar to Dr Ibadoghlu.

The Financial Times published an article in November 2023, discussing the allegations against Dr. Ibadoghlu and the potential underlying reasons for his arrest, such as his research indicating that Azerbaijan is reselling Russian gas to Europe. The Washington Examiner reported on his arrest and research in corruption as well, quoting him in saying that ""All the companies that rent land in Karabakh either belong to the President's family ... or to high-ranking officials." Aliyev's propaganda claiming that he liberated Karabakh for ordinary Azerbaijanis is simply false."

The Washington Post published another opinion piece discussing a letter Dr Gubad Ibadoghlu wrote to the public. In this letter he described his worsening health condition and the refusal of the detention center to provide him treatment by an independent doctor. He also reiterated that in his opinion that the main reason for his arrest was his role in starting a foundation in the UK that would use assets seized from corrupt Azerbaijani politicians to fund the education of Azerbaijani students abroad.

The same letter was read to the MEP during a Euronest session at the European Parliament in March 2023 by one of Dr. Gubad's children, Zhala Bayramova. During the same meeting a report on human rights and democracy in the Eastern Europe was presented and this report was highly critical of the situation in Azerbaijan. Dr. Gubad Ibadoghlu himself was one of the contributors for this report. The public presentation of the letter and the report was met with strong criticism by the Azerbaijani delegates who were insisting that the report is biased and that Gubad Ibadoghlu is a criminal under investigation.

The Telegraph published an article in which Dr Gubad Ibadoghlu's children appeal to PM Keir Starmer to call for the release of their father.

After Dr Gubad Ibadoghlu was shortlisted for the 2024 Sakharov Prize, Table Media drew attention to the fact that even though he is supposed to travel to Strasbourg for the award ceremony, Dr Gubad is under house arrest and is in need of immediate surgery.

==== COP29 ====
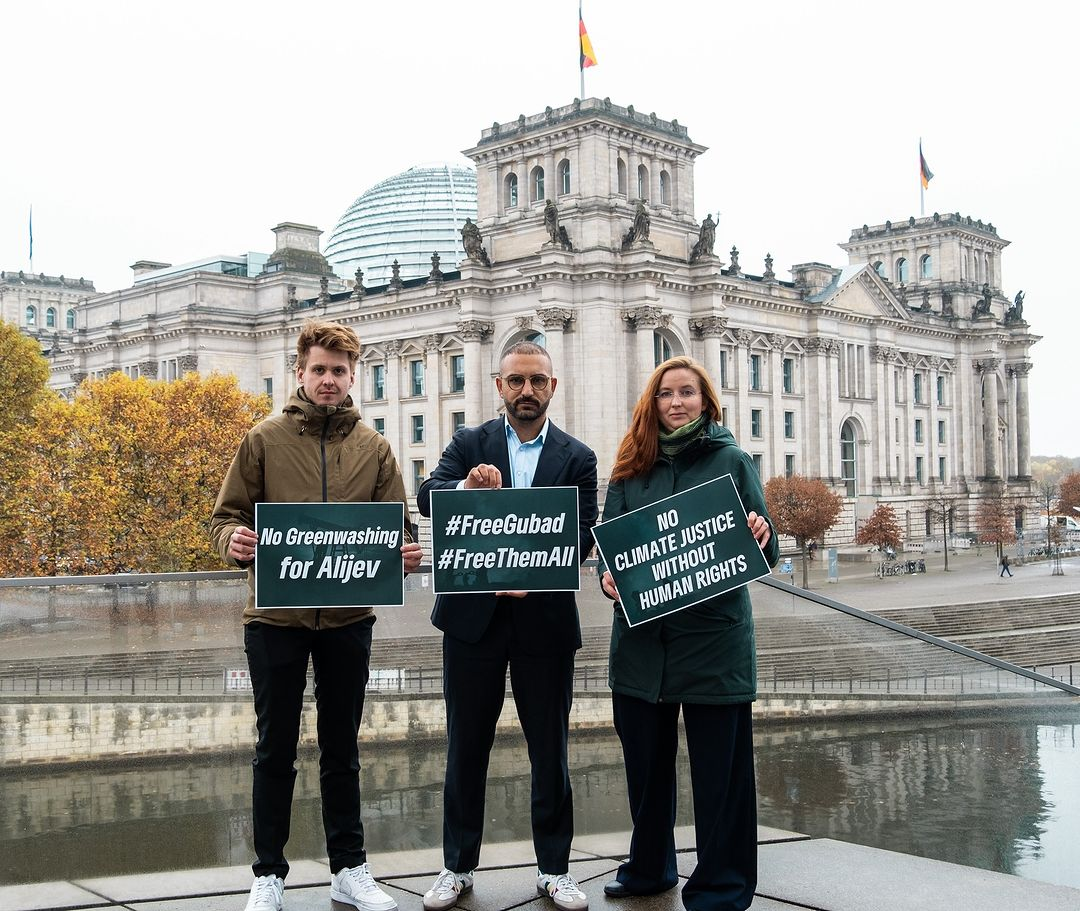
Members of Bundestag, Kassem Taher Saleh and Kathrin Henneberger have called for Dr Gubad Ibadoghlu's release during COP29.

It was announced in December 2023 that Azerbaijan will host COP29 in November 2024. This has led a to a wave of criticism aimed at Azerbaijan, drawing attention to its 2023-2024 crackdown on journalists, activists and academics, including Dr Gubad Ibadoghlu.

During the Bonn climate conference in June 2024 there was a campaign by activists and human rights organizations to ensure that the agreements between the UNFCCC and the countries hosting COP include provisions for strong human rights protections in these countries.

Dr Gubad, while in house arrest, published an article criticizing the insufficient spending on environmental protection in Azerbaijan, with no expenditures aimed at tackling the effects of climate change. He also criticized the level of preparedness to host COP29 in Baku and the ongoing human rights violations.

In the days leading up to the conference human rights organizations and news outlets published pieces drawing attention to the human rights abuses, imprisonment and inhumane treatment of Dr Gubad Ibadoghlu and other political prisoners, and the fact that Azerbaijan, the country that hosted the climate conference, is a large oil and gas exporter.

== Scholarships and fellowships ==
- Ludovika Fellowship Program, 2022
- Institute for International Education/Scholar Rescue Fond (IIE/SRF), 2017, the Visiting researcher at Institute for Advanced Study, Princeton, NJ, USA, October 2, 2017- April 2, 2018
- Fulbright Scholar, the visiting professor at Duke University, Durham, USA, September 2015- March 2016
- Reagan-Fascell Democracy Fellowship Program, NED, Washington DC, USA, March–August 2015
- Junior Faculty Development Program (JFDP), ACCELS, the University of North Carolina at Chapel Hill, NC, USA, December 2008 - May 2015
- Institute for International Education/Scholar Rescue Fond (IIE/SRF), Central European University, Budapest, Hungary, January - June 2005
- Black Sea Fellowship Program awarded by OSI East - East: Partnership Beyond Borders Program with cooperation Bulgarian Centre for Not-for-Profit Law, Sofia, Bulgaria, July- August 2009
- Civil Society Scholar Award by Open Society Fund, December 2018 – March 2019
- Prague Civil Society Centre's Fellowship Program, June- August 2018
- Jozef Mianowski foundation for promoting science, Polish Academy of Science and Arts, Warsaw December 2000 - June 2001

== Personal life and family ==
Gubad Ibadoghlu is married to Irada Bayramova and has 3 children: Zhala Bayramova, Ibad Bayramov and Emin Bayramli.

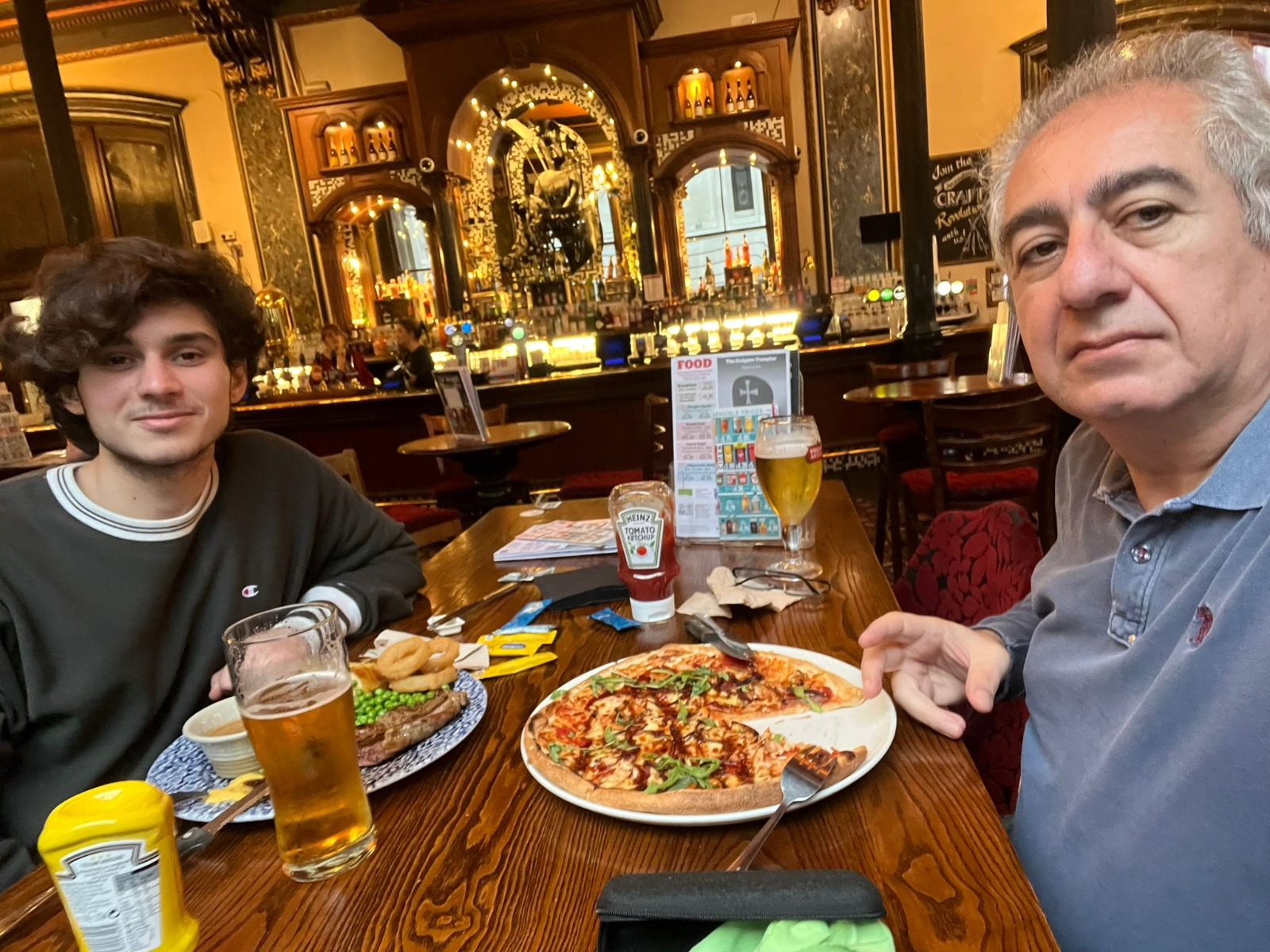
Dr. Gubad with his son Ibad.

Zhala Bayramova is a human rights lawyer who is focusing on LGBTQ+ cases. They worked on a variety of cases in Azerbaijan and many of them have been submitted to the European Court of Human Rights. They are also a peace activist and were one of the organizers Azerbaijani Feminist movement protests. Zhala Bayramova has been target of smear campaign for their peace activism, and Dr. Gubad has particularly stood behind Zhala's criticism of the blockade, showing his criticism for the current measures in place. They also were detained, and physically and sexually assaulted by the police in Azerbaijan 2021. As of 2023 they reside in Sweden and study a master program in the Human Rights Law at Lund University on SI scholarship. In Sweden, Zhala organized several meetings at student organizations and with Amnesty International Lund to discuss the political situation and LGBTQIA+ rights in Azerbaijan.

Ibad Bayramov has also started studying finance at Lund University in 2023 with SI scholarship.

Emin Bayramli is currently studying at Rutgers University financed by the dean's emergency fund.
