= Vugar =

Vugar or Vüqar (Azerbaijani: Vüqar) is an Azerbaijani masculine given name. Notable people with the name include:

- Vugar Ahmad
- Vugar Alakbarov (born 1981), Azerbaijani boxer
- Vugar Asgarov
- Vugar Bayramov (born 1975), Azerbaijani economist
- Vugar Gashimov (born 1986), Azerbaijani chess player
- Vugar Huseynov
- Vugar Mehdiyev (21st century), Azerbaijani Paralympic athlete
- Vüqar Mustafayev
- Vüqar Nadirov
- Vugar Orujov (born 1971), Russian sport wrestler
- Vugar Rasulov
