= Vugar Bayramov =

Azerbaijani economist

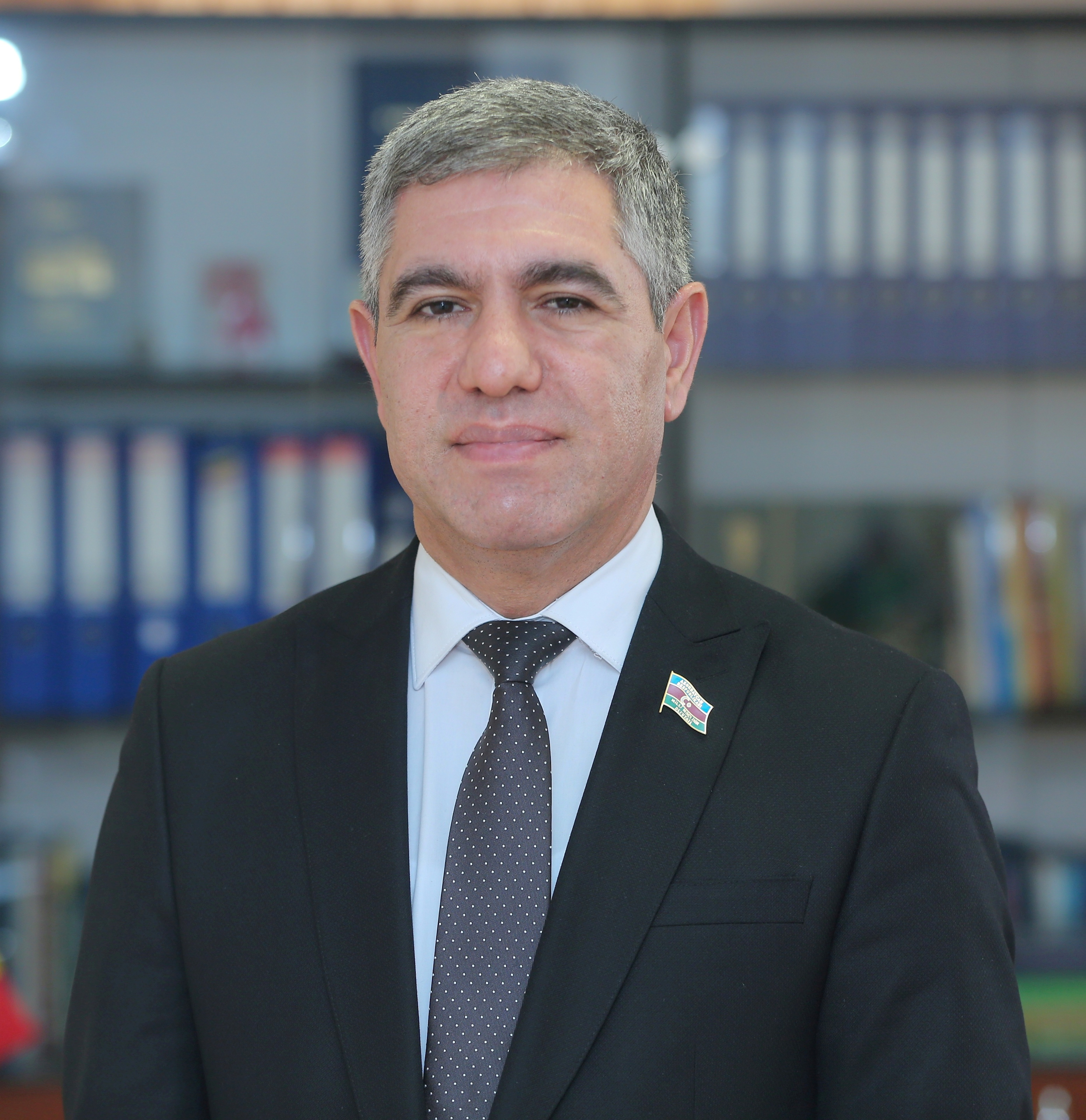
- Born: June 13, 1975 (age 51); Ashaghy Guzlak, Fuzuli District, Azerbaijan SSR

Academic work
- Institutions: Azerbaijan State Economic University

Vugar Ibad oghlu Bayramov (Azerbaijani: Vüqar İbad oğlu Bayramov) (born June 13, 1975, Ashaghy Guzlak, Fuzuli District, Azerbaijan SSR, Soviet Union) is an economist and the member of the National Assembly of Azerbaijan since 2020.

== Early life ==
Vugar Bayramov was born on 13 June 1975, in Ashaghy Guzlak village in Fuzuli District of Azerbaijan SSR. Firstly, he went to Ashagi Rafadinli village secondary school, then continued at Bunyad Sardarov secondary school of Fuzuli District. He graduated from Physics and Mathematics School in Baku.

Bayramov was admitted to Azerbaijan State University of Economics in 1992, and in 1997 he proceeded to the post-graduate school of the same university. He received a Ph.D. in economics in 2002. Through a grant by the U.S. Department of State, he completed a fellowship at Washington University in St. Louis.

Bayramov speaks English, Russian, Turkish, and Azerbaijani. He is the brother of scholar and opposition politician Gubad Ibadoghlu.

== Public works ==
Vugar Bayramov became the first Azerbaijani co-chair of the EU Eastern Partnership Civil Society Forum. He also served as the EU Eastern Partnership Civil Society Forum's Azerbaijani Coordinator. He was a member of the Steering Committee of the EU Eastern Partnership. Vugar Bayramov was the first Azerbaijani to be elected as the group coordinator at the Eastern Partnership Civil Society Forum. At the same time, he is the first Azerbaijani graduate of the " Austrian Leadership Programs".

In 2010, the Royal Islamic Strategic Studies Centre (RISSC) in Jordan named Vugar Bayramov one of the world's 500 most influential Muslims.

While studying in the United States, V. Bayramov also awarded a special diploma signed by world-renowned economist, Nobel laureate, Ronald Koase, for his new institutional economics research.

Bayramov is one of the co-authors of the strategic roadmaps prepared in 2016 and approved by the President of the Republic of Azerbaijan Ilham Aliyev. He is the main author of the "Strategic Roadmap for the development of affordable housing in Azerbaijan."

Bayramov is also the founder and chairman of the Center for Economic and Social Development (CESD). CESD is ranked 153rd out of 177 organizations globally in 2018, according to the 2018 Global Go To Think Tank Index (GGTTI), published by the University of Pennsylvania. CESD was declared the strongest brain center in 10 Central Asian countries (the classification covers Azerbaijan, Armenia, Georgia, Kazakhstan, Kyrgyzstan, Uzbekistan, Tajikistan, Turkmenistan, Afghanistan, and Mongolia).

== Political career ==
Vugar Bayramov was elected a deputy of the 6th convocation of the Parliament in the early parliamentary elections held on February 9, 2020, winning 71% of the votes in the 84th Fuzuli constituency. Vugar Bayramov is a member of the Committees on Economic policy, industry and entrepreneurship, and Labor and social policy.

== Publications ==
- Vugar Bayramov, ed. Ending Dependency: How Is Oil Revenues Effectively Used in Azerbaijan? (ISBN 978-9952-8131-0-4)
- Vugar Bayramov, Health Economics
- Vugar Bayramov, Social Insurance in Azerbaijan: Diagnostics and Recommendations on Policy and Implementation (ISBN 978-9952-8131-3-5)
