= Emin Özmen =

Turkish photographer, member of Magnum Photos

Emin Özmen (born 1985) is a Turkish photographer, photojournalist and film maker, and is a member of Magnum Photos.

== Life and work ==
Özmen is based in Istanbul. His work focuses on refugees in Turkey and the wider Middle East, including Syria and Iraq.

In 2013 he founded a photography cooperative named Agence Le Journal, which is based in Istanbul.

In 2017, he became a nominee member of Magnum Photos. Özmen became a full member in 2022.

In 2025, he documented the Venezuelan refugee crisis in Colombia, the pictures were exhibited in December at the 2025 Nobel Peace Prize Exhibition in honor of the laureate María Corina Machado.

== Awards ==
- 2014, Bayeux-Calvados Awards for war correspondents – Public Jury Photo Prize
- 2014, World Press Photo Multimedia Contest – 1st prize
- 2015, Magnum Photos Photographer Fund winner for 'Limbo' project

== Exhibitions ==
- 2013 Occupy Gezi, Netherlands, Amsterdam Mediamatic
- 2017 Les Limbes, Turkey, French Institute Istanbul
