= Vugar Ahmad =

Azerbaijani researcher

- Born: April 17, 1963
- Citizenship: Azerbaijan
- Spouse: Sabina Ahmadova
- Children: Almakhanym Ahmadli
- Website: vuqar-ahmed.com

Vugar Mikail oghlu Ahmad (Azerbaijani: Vüqar Mikayıl oğlu Əhməd) – Scientific researcher, member of New York Academy of Sciences from 2003. of the. Was elected Central Asian Institute of Folk History, named after A. Makhpirat of the Uzbekistan Republic, Turan Academy of Sciences, and a member of the International Academy of Turkic World Researchers, was awarded the International Order "Gold Star" for scientific achievement on Turkic world. Was elected a Corresponding Member of the International Arts and Sciences Academy.

== Life ==
Vugar Ahmad was born in Baku on 17 April 1963. He graduated from secondary school No.18 named after M.Mushfig in 1980, the Azerbaijan State Pedagogical University with “Honors” diploma in 1984, and postgraduate study from the Pedagogical University in 1990 successfully. He worked as a literature teacher in the Darakand village of Gobustan district in 1984–1987. In different years V.Ahmad worked as chief editor of the publishing house “Azerbaijani world” and “Novruz” newspaper, the deputy chairman of the Trade Union of Mass Media, as well as in various responsible positions in the Azerbaijani Television and Radio from 2005 until 1987. Meanwhile, he is senior scientific worker at the Institute of Literature named after Nizami Ganjavi of Azerbaijan National Academy of Sciences. He was a professor of Azerbaijan Institute of Teachers (2005–2011). Vugar Ahmad defended the degree of candidate in philology in 1992 and doctor of philology sciences in 2005. He is married and has a son and a daughter.

== Scientific performance indicators ==
Vugar Ahmad is an author of 33 books like “Russian children's literature and Azerbaijan” (Baku, 1992), “Mirjafar Pishavari: his life, environment and creativity” (Baku, 1998), “Azerbaijan children's literature” (Baku, 2006), “Literary criticism” (Baku, 2007), “Sheikh Muhammad Khiyabani”, “Scientific-philological researches” (Baku, 2010) etc., as well as 4 textbooks for high schools and more than 300 scientific and publicistic articles. His works have been published in Iran, Turkey, Greece, Germany, Georgia and other countries. He has promoted Azerbaijan as a scientist at conferences in Iran, Russia, Turkey and Sweden.

== Creative activity ==
He is also an author and a compositor of more than 500 songs. He held his recitals in Moscow, Tehran and Baku. He has published his novel “Karabakh's dream, or victory in dream”, reflecting the history of South Azerbaijan and Karabakh, “Garadaglilar” novel trilogy and is the “Azerbaijan until last breath” dedicated to Mammadamin Rasulzadeh. When V.Ahmad worked in AZTV channel, he was an editor and presenter of about 200 programs, television movie. With his leadership and editorship a great mugham project was filmed in ATV channel.

In 2008, the book “My mother” by the author was published in mass circulation in Tehran. In that year he made a speech about the invaluable works done by Mehriban Aliyeva, first lady of Azerbaijan, and contemporary national literary process on Iran State Television.

== Membership in scientific institutions ==
Vugar Ahmad is a full member of the New York Academy of Sciences, as well as the Azerbaijan Writers and Journalists, the Russian Derbent Writers Union, "Mugham" association, religious commission of Baku City Executive Power. He is also a member of “Dissertation Council” and chairman of "Literary criticism" association at the Institute of Literature of ANAS. Vugar Ahmad is an Academician of the International Academy of Sciences of Turkic World Studies, Member of New York Academy of Sciences, Member of “Turan” Academy of Sciences of the Republic of Uzbekistan, Academician of World Academy of Words and Corresponding Member of the Russian Academy of Sciences and Arts.

== Awards ==
He has been awarded with “Araz”, “Abdulla Shaig”, “Mammad Araz”, “Songwriter of the year”, “Zirva”, “Song of the Year”, “Simorgh” national awards, “Honorary Diploma” by the ETUC (in 2009 and 2013), “Golden pen” award by the decision of the presidium of AKIVHI (on 12 February 2013). He participated in more than 20 International Scientific conferences and symposium (Azerbaijan, Sweden, Turkey, Iran, Russia, Kazakhstan, Uzbekistan, Poland and others). He was a winner of International Poetry Festival held in Urmia. He was selected “The poet of the month” in world-class Antology held in Calcutta city of India in 2018.

== Books ==
- “Victim”. Baku. 1990
- G.R.Mirzazade. “Ayineyi-millat”. Baku, 1992, “Maarif”
- Russian children's literature and Azerbaijan. Baku, 1992, “Bilik”
- “Everyone's own voice”. Baku, 1993, “Azerbaijan dunyasi”
- “The tragedy of Seyavush”. Baku, 1993, “Azerbaijan dunyasi”
- Vugar Ahmad. “Sea of golden sand, sacrifice to your God!”. “Yazichi”, Baku 1993.
- Vugar Ahmad. “It is also my land” (Foreword). A.Gorarkhli “My land” poems.: Baku, 1993
- “Shahnaz's sound”. Baku, 1994, “Sherg-Gerb”
- “Grey-haired palm”. Baku, 1995, “Sherg-Gerb”
- “Actor's funeral”. Baku, 1995, “Sherg-Gerb” “Mirjafar Pishavari”. Baku, 1995, “Elm”
- “The features of Pishavari's publicity”. Baku, 1996, “Elm”
- “The lifetime in the struggles”. Baku, 1996, “Elm”
- “Pishavari's attitude to classical and contemporary literary works”. Baku, 1997, “Elm”
- “For national liberation and national-democratic press”. Baku, 1997, “Elm”
- “Pishavari's literary critical opinions”. Baku, 1998, “Elm”
- “M.J.Pishavari: his life, environment and creativity”. Baku, 1998, “Gokturk”
- “On the history of Azerbaijani-Russian literary relations in XX century” (1905–1917). Baku, 1998, “Sharg-Gerb”
- “The sound – the sound of Koran”. Baku, 2002, “MBM”
- “My songs”. Baku, 2002, “El-Allianje”
- “Pishavari: life in the struggles”, Baku, 2002, “El-Allianje”
- Vugar Ahmad (author and editor of the foreword). A.Asgar. “Fly my songs”. Poems. Baku, 2002
- Vugar Ahmad. “In honor of Kamanza”. “Word, music and me”, Baku, 2003
- Vugar Ahmad. “Mugham is proud of Talat”. “Word, music and me”, Baku, 2003
- “Pure water”. Baku, 2003, “El-Allianje”
- “I sing in my heart”. Baku, “MBM”, 2003
- “When inspired...”. Baku, “Min bir mahni”, 2003
- “Word, music and me”. Baku, “Min bir mahni”, 2003
- “My world with songs”, Baku, “Araz”, 2003
- “Good days ahead”. Baku, “Shur”, 2005
- “Azerbaijan children's literature”. Baku, “Muallim”, 2006
- Vugar Ahmad (editor). “Hokumali iftikhari Bigalam”. Compiler: Mammadagha Agharzaoglu. Baku-Shirvanneshir, 2006
- Vugar Ahmad. (Author and compiler of foreword). Ibrahim Zahid, “Ghazals”, Baku, 2006
- The program for the subject “Literary criticism” for bachelors of Philology faculties in universities. Baku, “Muallim”, 2007
- The program for the subject “Literary theory” for bachelors of Philology faculties in universities. Baku, “Muallim”, 2007
- Vugar Ahmad. Azerbaijani language. Textbook for 9th grade students in Russian-language schools. (Vugar Ahmad: the poem “My Tabriz”. Baku, 2007
- Vugar Ahmad. “Worthy son of Azerbaijan” article and poem. Mirashraf Fatiyev – translator, author of foreword of the monograph “Innovative development of the city's housing and communal economy”, Baku, 2007
- V.Ahmad (compiler, editor and author of foreword). Abbasgulu Ismail. “Tale of a fortune”. Poems. Baku, 2007
- The textbook “Literary criticism” for students of Philology faculties. Baku, “Muallim”, 2008
- “Thoughts about scientific-philological sources, literary figures”. Baku, “Muallim”, 2010
- “Sheikh Muhammad Khiyabani” (His life, environment and literary activity). Monograph. Baku, “Muallim”, 2010
- “Karabakh dream or victory in dream”. Baku, “MBM”, 2012
- “Garadaglilar”. Novel. “Trilogy”. Baku, “Araz”, 2013
- “Azerbaijan until Last Breath”. Baku, “ MBM”, 2014
- South Azerbaijan Poetry. (1950–2010). Baku, “MBM”, 2014
- M.Shahriyar. Selected works. (Poetic and philological translation of the works by M.Shahriyar in Persian). Baku, “Ecoprint”, 2016
