= Almaxanım =

Almakhanym
- Born: August 18, 2001 (age 24); Baku, Azerbaijan
- Genres: Pop; Folk
- Occupation: Singer
- Years active: 2014–present

Almakhanym Vugar gyzy Ahmadli (Azerbaijani: Almaxanım Vüqar qızı Əhmədli, born August 18, 2001) is a Soloist of AzTV, winner of VI TV mugham contest, young singer.

== Life ==
Almakhanym Ahmadli was born on August 18, 2001, in Baku, in an intellectual family. She is the daughter of a literary critic, poet, Doctor of Philology, Professor Vugar Ahmad. She studied at Humanitarian Gymnasium, which was named after the S.J.Pishavari, from 2006 to 2014. She graduated with honors from the secondary school named after M.A. Sabir in Baku, in 2017. In 2017, she also graduated with honors "Mugham" department of Music School No. 13, named after Said Rustamov, in Baku. In 2017, she entered to the faculty of "Solo singing" of Azerbaijan National Conservatory.

== Activities ==
- On July 13, 2014, the first audio CD "Karabakh" was released, consisting of mugham, tasnif, folk and composer songs.
- In March 2014, she was awarded "Bronze" medal and a diploma of the winner "International music contest" of Turkic peoples.
- Appears on television since October 7, 2014.
- Performances are currently broadcast on 7 American and 4 European TV channels. Mugham combinations, composers and folk songs, as well as songs in Turkish, Arabic, Persian and English take place in her repertoire.
- On June 12, 2017, she was winner of "VI Mugham Contest" which was organized by Heydar Aliyev Foundation, then it was awarded with "Qran Pri", which was organized by Azerbaijan State Television, the "Ministry of Culture and Tourism" and the "Cultural Foundation".
- Mugham combination was sung by Almakhanym Ahmadli during the competition will be kept in the "gold fund" of television and radio. Takes mughams classes from Honored singer of the Republic, young singer, mugham master Tayyar Bayramov.
- Nowadays she is working as a soloist of AzTV since 2017.
- "V Republican Mugham Contest"- won first place.
- She gave her first solo concert at the "International Mugham Center" in 2017.
- Gave a solo concert in Dushanbe, Tajikistan on occasion of 100th anniversary of Azerbaijan Democratic Republic in 2018.
- Gave a solo concert in Jerusalem in 2019.
