= Baruj Benacerraf =

Venezuelan-American-Moroccan immunologist

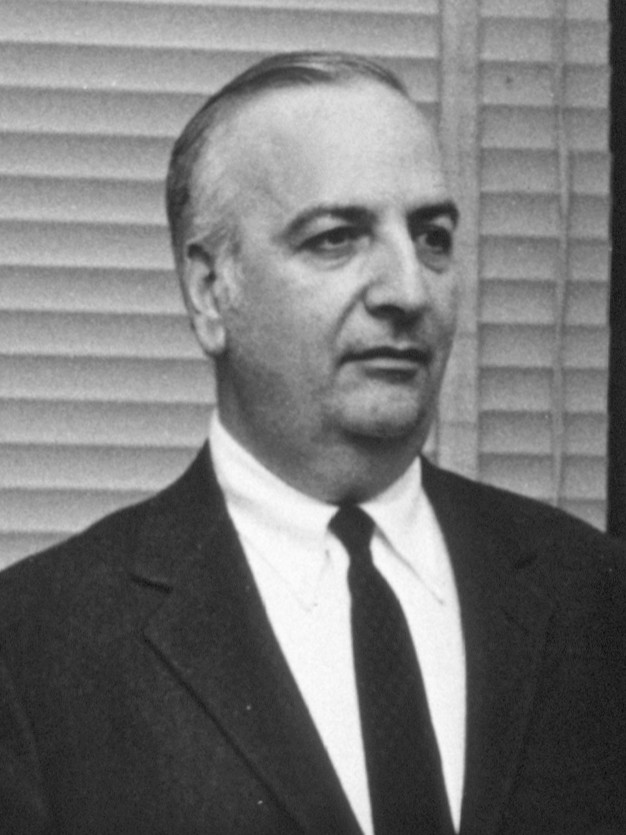
- Benacerraf in 1969
- Born: Baruj Benacerraf Lasry; October 29, 1920; Caracas, Venezuela
- Died: August 2, 2011 (aged 90); Jamaica Plain, Massachusetts, U.S.
- Citizenship: Venezuela; United States (from 1943)
- Education: Columbia University; Virginia Commonwealth University
- Known for: Major histocompatibility complex
- Spouse: Annette Dreyfus (m. 1943; died 2011)
- Children: 1 daughter
- Awards: National Medal of Science; 1980 Nobel Prize in Physiology or Medicine
- Scientific career
- Fields: Immunology, medicine
- Workplaces: Virginia Commonwealth University; New York University; Columbia University College of Physicians and Surgeons; National Institutes of Health; American Academy of Arts and Sciences; Harvard Medical School; Dana–Farber Cancer Institute

Baruj Benacerraf Lasry (/bəˈrʊk ˌbɛnəseɪˈrɑːf/; October 29, 1920 – August 2, 2011) was a Venezuelan immunologist, who shared the 1980 Nobel Prize in Physiology or Medicine for the "discovery of the major histocompatibility complex genes which encode cell surface protein molecules important for the immune system's distinction between self and non-self." His colleagues and shared recipients were Jean Dausset and George Davis Snell.

== Early life and education ==
Benacerraf was born in Caracas, Venezuela on October 29, 1920, to a Moroccan-Venezuelan Sephardic Jewish father, Abraham Benacerraf, and Algerian Jewish mother, Henrietta Lasry. His father was a textile merchant. His brother was philosopher Paul Benacerraf. He moved to Paris from Venezuela with his family in 1925. After going back to Venezuela, he emigrated to the U.S. in 1940. That same year, Benacerraf attended Lycée Français de New York, where he earned a Baccalauréat (an academic qualification French students achieve after high school and a diploma necessary to begin university studies).

In 1942, he earned his B.S. at Columbia University School of General Studies. He then went on to obtain his M.D. degree from the Medical College of Virginia, the only school to which he was accepted due to his Jewish background. Shortly after beginning medical school, Benacerraf became a naturalized U.S. citizen.

From his Nobel autobiography: "By that time, I had elected to study biology and medicine, instead of going into the family business, as my father would have wanted. I did not realize, however, that admission to Medical School was a formidable undertaking for someone with my ethnic and foreign background in the United States of 1942. In spite of an excellent academic record at Columbia, I was refused admission by the numerous medical schools I applied to and would have found it impossible to study medicine except for the kindness and support of George W. Bakeman, father of a close friend, who was then Assistant to the President of the Medical College of Virginia in Richmond. Learning of my difficulties, Mr. Bakeman arranged for me to be interviewed and considered for one of the two remaining places in the Freshman class."

== Career ==
After his medical internship, US Army service (1945–48), and working at the military hospital of Nancy, France, he became a researcher at Columbia University College of Physicians and Surgeons (1948–50). He performed research in Paris (1950–56), relocated to New York University (1956–68), moved to the National Institutes of Health (1968–70), then joined Harvard University medical school in Boston (1970–91) where he became the Fabyan Professor of comparative Pathology, concurrently serving the Dana–Farber Cancer Institute (1980). He began studying allergies in 1948, and discovered the Ir (immune response) genes that govern transplant rejection in the 1960s. Including a variety of different editions, Benacerraf is an author of over 300 books and articles.

At Columbia, Benacerraf got his start in immunology with Elvin A. Kabat in 1948. He spent two years in Kabat's laboratory working on experimental hypersensitivity mechanisms. He then moved to Paris because of family issues and accepted a position in Bernard Halpern's laboratory at the Hôpital Broussais. Here he also formed a close relationship with Italian scientist Guido Biozzi. For six years he worked on the reticuloendothelial function in relation to immunity. The reticuloendothelial function is the white blood cells inside of a barrier tissue. While there they discovered techniques to study the clearance of particulate matter from the blood by the RES (reticuloendothelial system) and devised equations that govern this process in mammals. After six years, Baruj returned to the United States in 1956 because he could not establish his own independent laboratory in France. He was recruited to the faculty of New York University (NYU), established his own laboratory, and returned to his studies on hypersensitivity.

In New York, Baruj worked with several other immunologists on different fields of hypersensitivity. After working in his New York lab, Baruj turned his attention towards the training of new scientists, and made the decision to devote himself to his laboratory practices, instead of the family business. At this time Baruj also made the discovery that would go on to win him the Nobel Prize. He noticed that if antigens (something that causes a reaction with the immune system) were injected into animals with a similar heredity, two groups emerged: responders and non-responders. He then conducted further study and found that the dominant autosomal genes, termed the immune response genes, determined the response to certain antigens. This complex process would lead to the understanding of how these genes determine immune responses.

His discovery still holds true, and more has been discovered over the last century. More than 30 genes have been discovered in a gene complex called the major histocompatibility complex. The histocompatibility complex is a complex part of DNA that controls the immune response. This research has also led to clarify autoimmune diseases such as multiple sclerosis and rheumatoid arthritis.

== Awards ==
He was elected a Fellow of the American Academy of Arts and Sciences in 1971.

Other notable awards include:

- Rous-Whipple Award of the American Association of Pathologists 1985
- National Medal of Science 1990
- Gold-Headed Cane Award of the American Association for Investigative Pathology 1996
- Charles A. Dana Award for pioneering achievements in Health and Education 1996

== Honorary degrees received ==
- Honorary Degree of Doctor of Sciences, Virginia Commonwealth University 1981
- Honorary Degree of Doctor of Sciences, New York University 1981
- Honorary Degree of Doctor of Sciences, Yeshiva University 1982
- Honorary Degree of Doctor of Sciences, Columbia University 1985
- Honorary Degree of Doctor of Sciences, Adelphi University 1988
- Honorary Degree of Doctor of Philosophy, Weizmann Institute of Sciences 1989
- Honorary Degree of Doctor of Sciences, Gustav Adolphus University 1992
- Honorary Degree of Doctor of Sciences, Harvard University 1992
- Honorary Degree of Doctor of Sciences, Université de Bordeaux 1993
- Honorary Degree of Doctor of Medicine, University of Vienna 1995

== Later years and death ==
His autobiography was published in 1998. Benacerraf died on August 2, 2011, in Jamaica Plain, Massachusetts of pneumonia. His wife, Annette, predeceased him by two months. Their daughter, Beryl, who died in late 2022, was a Harvard Medical School graduate who taught at Harvard and was a director at the Brigham and Women's Hospital, as well as the Massachusetts General Hospital.

== See also ==
- List of Jewish Nobel laureates
- List of Venezuelan Nobel laureates
- List of Venezuelans
