= Marcell Felipe =

Cuban American attorney

Marcell Felipe is a Cuban American attorney and businessman, and chairman of the American Museum of the Cuban Diaspora. Felipe founded the Inspire America Foundation, an organization that promotes democracy in Cuba and the Americas. He also founded the Initiative for Democratic and Economic Alternatives for Cuba, a project of Inspire America, and co-founded América CV (which owns América TeVé, a Miami, Florida-based media group). Felipe has been described as the "conscience" of the Cuban American community.

In 2018, Felipe was elected board chair of the American Museum of the Cuban Diaspora, and re-elected in 2019. He curated the museum’s permanent exhibit, “The Cuban Experience.”

Felipe also serves as a member of the board of trustees at Miami Dade College, which he pushed to cancel its China-financed Confucius Institute in 2019. He supported the historic preservation and reopening of Miami’s Freedom Tower as a museum and cultural center.

== Education and career ==
Felipe graduated from the University of Pittsburgh School of Law. Felipe is an international tax and corporate lawyer, and a member of the Florida Bar. He founded Marcell Felipe Attorneys in 2002, advising government and industry leaders on legal issues.

== American Museum of the Cuban Diaspora ==
Felipe serves as chairman of the American Museum of the Cuban Diaspora (also known as “The Cuban”), having been elected as board chair in 2018 and re-elected in 2019. At the time of his election, the museum faced a financial crisis. In 2019, he announced the firing of the museum's director, Ileana Fuentes, and her daughter, Carisa Perez-Fuentes, who served as head of communications and design, after a split in leadership of the museum. Felipe accused Fuentes and her daughter of “kidnapping” the museum from the board of directors and mismanaging the institution.

Under Felipe’s leadership, the museum was reorganized primarily as a history institution. He designed The Cuban's permanent exhibit, "The Cuban Experience," based on his time as a student at Florida International University, where he worked with former Cuban political prisoners at La Casa del Preso in Miami. A critic of communism in Cuba, Felipe claims the museum is “an icon of freedom."

== Miami Dade College ==
Felipe serves as a member of the board of trustees at Miami Dade College, where his input in the 2019 presidential search process ultimately led to the appointment of Madeline Pumariega in 2020. At his request, the college also canceled its China-financed Confucius Institute in 2019.

Felipe also pushed for the historic preservation of Miami’s iconic Freedom Tower, with Florida Governor Ron DeSantis eventually granting $25 million for critical renovations to the building in November 2021. In September 2025, Felipe was involved with the Freedom Tower's official reopening as a museum and cultural center.

In an October 2025 op-ed column in the Miami Herald, Felipe revealed that he voted to transfer land owned by Miami Dade College to facilitate construction of the Donald Trump Presidential Library. That same month, he celebrated Venezuelan opposition leader María Corina Machado's receipt of the Nobel Peace Prize. Felipe played a key role in initiating Machado's nomination.
