= Dərəkənd, Nakhchivan =

Dərəkənd
- Municipality
- Location within Azerbaijan
- Coordinates: 39°32′21″N 45°02′57″E
- Country: Azerbaijan
- Autonomous republic: Nakhchivan
- District: Sharur

Population (2005)
  - Total: 1,216
- Time zone: UTC+4 (AZT)

Dərəkənd (also, Derekend) is a village and municipality in the Sharur District of Nakhchivan Autonomous Republic, Azerbaijan. It is located in the near of the Nakhchivan-Sharur highway, 10 km in the south-east from the district center, on the Sharur plain. Its population is mainly busy with animal husbandry. There are secondary school, library, club and a medical center in the village. It has a population of 1,216.

== Etymology ==
The name of the Dərəkənd village was made out of components of dərə (valley) and kənd (place of residence, settlement, village) means "the village located in the valley". There has information about establishing the village in the 19th century.
