= List of Venezuelan Nobel laureates =

Two Venezuelan citizens have been associated with a Nobel Prize: the immunologist Baruj Benacerraf who was awarded the 1980 Nobel Prize in Physiology or Medicine alongside French immunologist Jean Dausset and American immunologist George Davis Snell, and the politician María Corina Machado, who received the 2025 Nobel Peace Prize for promoting democratic rights in Venezuela and working toward a peaceful transition from dictatorship to democracy.

== Laureates ==
Year	Image	Laureate	Born	Died	Field	Citation
1980		Baruj Benacerraf	29 October 1920; Caracas, Venezuela	2 August 2011; Jamaica Plain, Massachusetts, U.S.	Physiology or Medicine	"for their discoveries concerning genetically determined structures on the cell surface that regulate immunological reactions" (awarded together with French immunologist Jean Dausset and American immunologist George Davis Snell)
2025		María Corina Machado	7 October 1967; Caracas, Venezuela		Peace	"for her tireless work promoting democratic rights for the people of Venezuela and for her struggle to achieve a just and peaceful transition from dictatorship to democracy"

== Nominations ==
Venezuelans started receiving nominations in 1908. There are also other purported nominees whose nominations are yet to be verified since the archives are revealed 50 years after, including the Venezuelan human rights organization Foro Penal, which has been reportedly nominated for the Nobel Peace Prize in 2015, 2016 and 2019.

Image	Nominee	Born	Died	Years Nominated	Citation
Literature
	Julio Calcaño	4 December 1840 Caracas, Venezuela	18 August 1918 Caracas, Venezuela	1908	
	Rufino Blanco Fombona	17 June 1874 Caracas, Venezuela	16 October 1944 Buenos Aires, Argentina	1928, 1929, 1930, 1933, 1935	
	Clotilde Crespo de Arvelo	19 September 1887 Los Teques, Venezuela	1959 Caracas, Venezuela	1930	
	Rómulo Gallegos	2 August 1884 Caracas, Venezuela	5 April 1969 Caracas, Venezuela	1951, 1959, 1960, 1961, 1962, 1963, 1964, 1966, 1967	
	Wilhelm Lehmann	4 May 1882 Puerto Cabello, Venezuela	17 November 1968 Eckernförde, Germany	1960	
	Robert Ganzo	22 August 1898 Caracas, Venezuela	6 April 1995 Boulogne-Billancourt, France	1970	
Peace
	Carlos Medina Chirinos	Venezuela	Venezuela	1926	

== See also ==
- List of Nobel laureates by country
