= Belinda Davis =

American historian

Belinda Joy Davis (born July 13, 1959) is an American historian of modern Germany and Europe at Rutgers University.

== Biography ==
She holds a BA from Wesleyan University, and earned her PhD from the University of Michigan. Davis writes on popular politics and social change. She is currently Professor of History at Rutgers University.

Davis served on the editorial board of the American Historical Review, and as North American editor of Women’s History Review. She was Fernand Braudel Senior Fellow at the European University Institute in Florence in 2015, and Research Fellow at the Shelby Cullom Davis Center, Princeton University, 2003 - 2004. Davis co-directed the Volkswagen Foundation-funded research project "Das Fremde im Eigenen: Interkultureller Austausch und kollektive Identitäten in der Revolte der 1960er Jahre.” She is also a political activist, working with the Poor People's Economic Human Rights Campaign.

== Selected works ==
- The Internal Life of Politics: Extraparliamentary Opposition in West Germany, 1962-1983 (Cambridge: Cambridge University Press, 2019)
- Changing the World, Changing Oneself: Political Protest and Transnational Identities in 1960s/70s, West Germany and the U.S., ed., with Wilfried Mausbach, Martin Klimke, and Carla MacDougall (New York/Oxford: Berghahn Books, 2010, 2012)
- Alltag—Erfahrung—Eigensinn. Historisch-anthropologische Erkundungen, ed., with Thomas Lindenberger and Michael Wildt (Frankfurt a.M./New York: Campus, 2008)
- Home Fires Burning: Food, Politics, and Everyday Life in World War I Berlin (Chapel Hill: The University of North Carolina Press, 2000)
