= Dərəkənd, Gobustan =

Dərəkənd
- Municipality
- Location within Azerbaijan
- Coordinates: 40°30′10″N 48°56′24″E
- Country: Azerbaijan
- Rayon: Gobustan

Population
  - Total: 378
- Time zone: UTC+4 (AZT)
  - Summer (DST): UTC+5 (AZT)

Dərəkənd (also, Darakend and Derekend) is a village and municipality in the Gobustan Rayon of Azerbaijan. It has a population of 378.
