= Aşağı Güzlək =

- Location within Azerbaijan Location within Karabakh Economic Region
- Coordinates: 39°29′N 47°08′E
- Country: Azerbaijan
- District: Fuzuli
- Time zone: UTC+4 (AZT)

Aşağı Güzlək (also, Ashagy Gyuzlyak, Kyuzlyak, and Yukhary Gyuzlyak) is a village in the Fuzuli District of Azerbaijan.
