= Exit =

Exit(s) may refer to:

== Architecture and engineering ==
- Door
- Portal (architecture), an opening in the walls of a structure
- Emergency exit
- Overwing exit, a type of emergency exit on an airplane
- Exit ramp, a feature of a road interchange

== Art and entertainment ==
=== Comics and magazines ===
- Exit (comics), a French comic by Bernard Werber and Alain Mounier
- Exit (British magazine), a British photography magazine
- Exit (American magazine), an American art magazine

=== Film ===
- Exit (1986 film), a Canadian film directed by Robert Ménard
- Exit (1990 film), a Swedish animated film
- Exit (1996 film), an American film with a screenplay by Joe Augustyn
- Exit (Nöd ut), a 1996 Swedish short film starring Geir Hansteen Jörgensen
- Exit (2000 film), a French film directed by Olivier Megaton
- Exit (2006 film), a Swedish film starring Maria Langhammer
- Exit: una storia personale, a 2010 Italian film by Massimiliano Amato
- Exit (2011 film), an Australian-Canadian film directed by Marek Polgar
- Exit (2019 film), a South Korean action disaster film by Lee Sang-geun
- Exits (film), a 1979 Australian film about the 1975 dismissal of the ruling Labour government

=== Music ===
- The Exit, an American indie/punk/reggae band
- Exit (festival), a music festival in Serbia
- Exit (musician), David Shikalepo (born 1989), Namibian musician
- EXIT (performance art group), an experimental musical group that featured members of the punk band Crass
- Exit Records, an American record label

==== Albums ====
- Exit (Alice album), or the title song, 1998
- Exit (Darin album), 2013
- Exit (k-os album), or the title song, "EXIT (Call Me)", 2002
- Exit (Pat Martino album), or the title song, 1977
- Exit (Rotten Sound album), or the title song, 2005
- Exit (Shugo Tokumaru album), 2007
- Exit (Tangerine Dream album), or the title song, 1981
- Exit, by Barney McAll, 1996
- Exits (album), by The Boxer Rebellion, 2005

==== Songs ====
- "Exit" (Cupcakke song), 2017
- "Exit" (Porno Graffitti song), 2011
- "Exit" (U2 song), 1987
- "Exit", a 2021 song by TFN
- "Exits" (song), by Foals, 2019
- "The Exit", by Lydia from Devil

=== Television ===
- Exit (game show), in America (2013)
- Exit (South Korean TV series) (2018)
- Exit (Norwegian TV series), starring Tobias Santelmann (2021)
- "eXit", a 2019 episode of Mr. Robot

=== Theatre ===
- EXIT Theatre, an alternative theatre in San Francisco, California, US
- Exit: An Illusion, a one-act play by Marita Bonner
- Exit, a 1984 play by the Catalan mime comedy group Tricicle

=== Video games ===
- Exit (video game), a 2005 action/puzzle game

== Computing ==
- Exit (command), a termination command for many command-line interpreters and scripting languages
- exit (system call), a system call to terminate a running process
- EXIT chart, a technique to aid the construction of error-correcting codes
- User exit, a predefined replaceable procedure in a software package
- .exit, a defunct pseudo-top-level domain
- break statement (in some languages exit, or last), a structured control statement that sends execution to just after the loop containing it

== Organisations ==
- Dignity in Dying, formerly Exit, a pro-euthanasia group founded in the United Kingdom
- Exit (group), three European anti-Nazi organisations
- Exit (right-to-die organisation), an independent research group based in the United Kingdom
- Exit International, a pro-euthanasia group founded in Australia

== Other uses ==
- Exit (investing), a deal for removing an ownership stake in an enterprise
  - Exit planning, preparation for an exit
- Barriers to exit, obstacles in the path of a firm that wants to leave a given market
- EXIT procedure, ex utero intrapartum, an obstetrics procedure
- Exit strategy, a means of leaving one's current situation

== See also ==
- XIT (disambiguation)
- No Exit (disambiguation)
- The Exit (disambiguation)
- Egress (disambiguation)
- Quit (disambiguation)
