= Venezuelan opposition =

Opposition to Hugo Chávez, Nicolás Maduro, and Delcy Rodríguez

Flag of Venezuela until 2006, with seven stars instead of eight, and the coat of arms at the top left used by many opposition groups

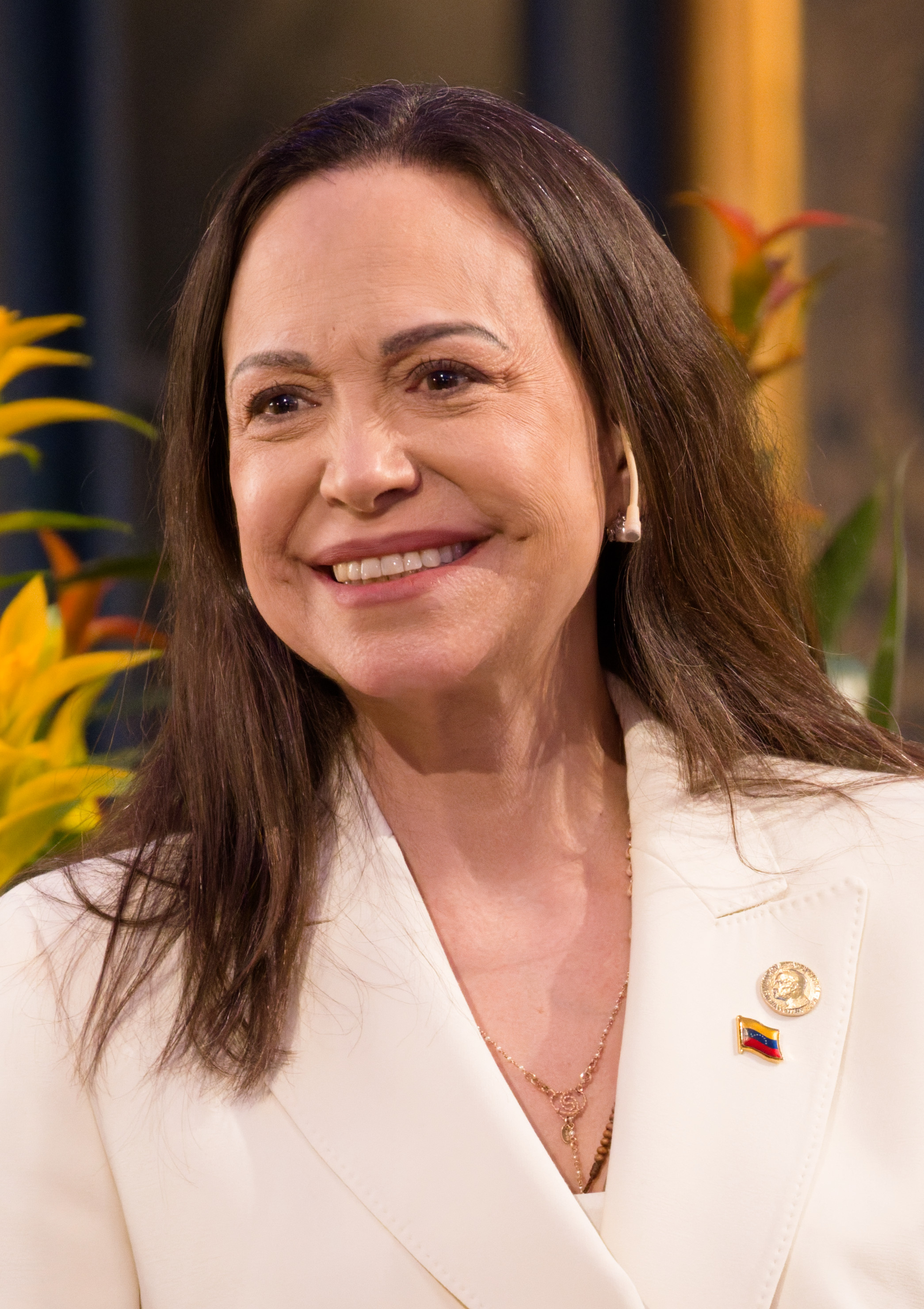
María Corina Machado, winner of the 2025 Nobel Peace Prize, is currently considered one of the main opposition leaders.

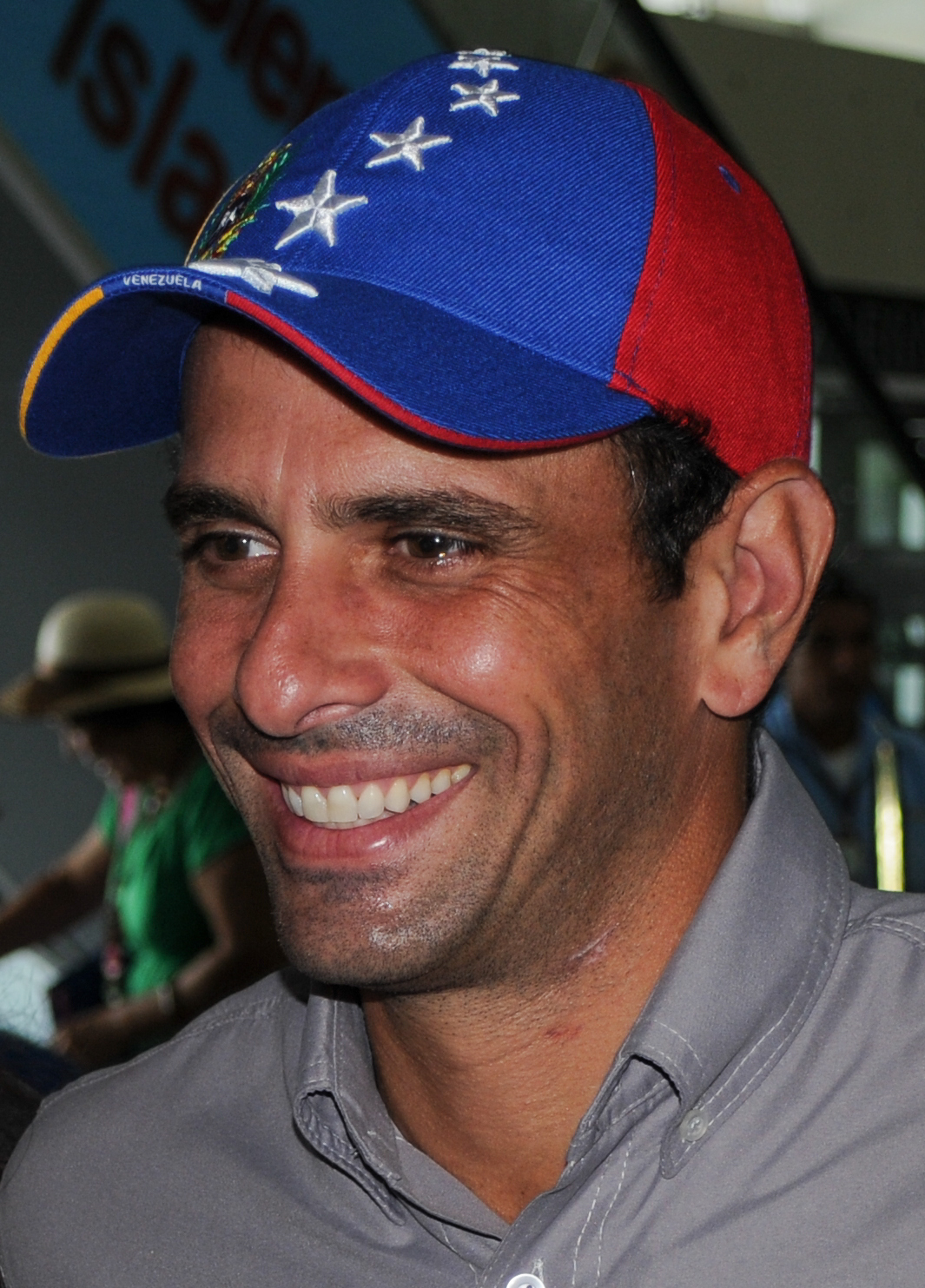
Henrique Capriles, the presidential opposition candidate in 2012 and 2013, wearing the tricolor hat.

The Venezuelan opposition, also referred to as anti-Chavismo, is a political umbrella term used to describe political, social, and religious movements that have opposed the Chavismo ideology and the associated Bolivarian Revolution political process since 2 February 1999 under the leadership of Hugo Chávez, Nicolás Maduro, and Delcy Rodríguez.

== Background ==
After the February 1992 coup attempt, the traditional political parties in the Venezuelan Congress unanimously approved a document condemning the actions of Chávez and his companions, as well as endorsing democracy as a form of government. Congressman David Morales Bello specifically exclaimed, "Death to the coup plotters!"

Chávez became a presidential candidate in April 1997, after obtaining the approval of his political movement, the MBR-200, to participate in the 1998 elections, founding the Fifth Republic Movement party. At the time, the frontrunner was Irene Sáez, Miss Universe 1981 and mayor of the Chacao Municipality, but she lost popularity after receiving backing from COPEI.

Chávez was declared the winner of the 1998 presidential elections and the opposition electoral front, the Polo Democrático, dissolved afterwards. However, despite losing the presidential elections, the non-Chavista political forces held a majority in Congress and represented an obstacle for Chávez's Constituent Assembly, as he promised to seek their support to push it forward.

== Chávez presidency ==
=== 1999 Constituent Assembly ===
Although Chávez promised to seek the support of the opposition-dominated Congress before starting the Constituent process, on his first day as president, Chávez decreed a call for a referendum to determine whether a new Constitution should be drafted using a method proposed by him. According to statements made at the time by the head of the Movement for Socialism parliamentary group, Chavismo's main ally in Congress, even they had not been informed of this step beforehand. Once again, the opposition was caught divided: the COPEI party, Justice First and former candidate Irene Sáez, who had just formed an alliance with the Chavistas in the Nueva Esparta state, supported the decree; Henrique Salas Römer's Project Venezuela and Democratic Action (AD) criticized the manner in which Chávez was leading the process, arguing that it excluded the Congress. La Causa R and Convergencia were cautious as they did not know the details of the country's project proposed by the President. Only the Movimiento Apertura of former President Carlos Andrés Pérez was completely opposed to the measure.

The process promoted by Chávez was not set forth in the 1961 Venezuelan Constitution, but two favorable decisions of the Supreme Court of Justice in January 1999 paved the way for this proposal. The Supreme Court even ratified Chávez's opinion that since the Constituent Power was an "original power", it should not be subject to the powers established in the current constitution. The National Electoral Council (CNE) gave its approval after reviewing the bases proposed by the President, and the referendum was set for 25 April. Henry Ramos Allup, from Democratic Action, criticized then the behavior of the bodies, saying that they presented an "obsequious attitude" towards the President.

The April 1999 Venezuelan constitutional referendum was held under a climate of electoral apathy. The abstention was 62.4%, and the result was overwhelmingly in favor of the proponents of the Constituent, who obtained a vote of 87.8%. The bases proposed by Chávez and revised by the CNE were also approved, although with a slightly lower support. A proportional representation system in the selection of the members of the National Constituent Assembly was then discarded, and in its place a personalized uninominal direct representation system was established, which divided the country into two great national circuits and one electoral circuit for each state, a system in disuse since the dictatorship of Juan Vicente Gómez.

The result of the election of constituents was the over-representation of Chavismo in the Constituent Assembly and a crushing defeat for the opposition, which had once again gone to the polls divided. With 65% of the votes, Chavismo obtained more than 95% of the constituents. Although the great majority of the candidates were civil society members, outside the political parties, the lack of unity atomized their efforts. As such, 33% of the forces that voted for candidates unrelated to the Chavismo, only managed to bring seven constituents, one of them being Antonia Muñoz, a dissident Chavista who soon rejoined the ruling party. Political parties and civil associations were marginalized from the constituent process, and the role of opposition then fell on the state institutions, where the Congress and the Supreme Court stand out. After the elections, Democratic Action and Copei experienced internal crises: the former announced new base elections to renew the party, and the directive of the latter resigned immediately.

Although the Chavismo obtained near absolute control of the Constituent Assembly, this did not mean that Chávez did not find opposition within his own supporters to several of his proposals for the new Constitution. There were several important changes pushed by Chávez which had initially been discarded by the Constituent Assembly, and which were only admitted under direct pressure from the President. Among the main ones were the inclusion of the term "Bolivarian" in the official name of Venezuela, the suppression of the voting "second round" or ballot, and the restriction of the taxing powers of the states.

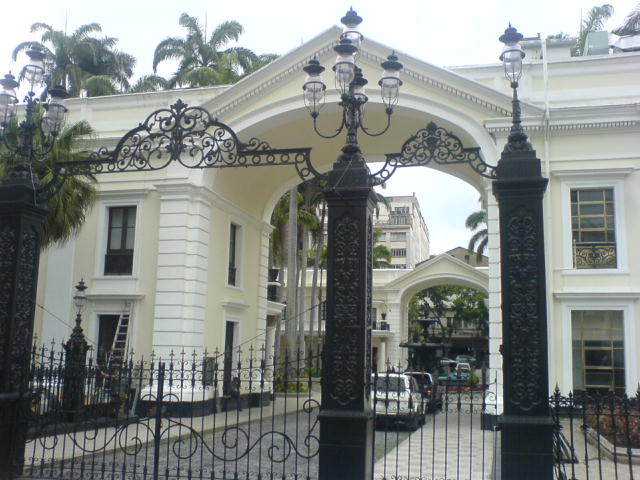
The clashes at the Federal Legislative Palace (pictured) was one of the first conflicts between Chavistas and opponents, which took place on 27 August 1999, after the National Constituent Assembly, controlled by the ruling party, occupied the building, seat of the Venezuelan Congress, controlled by the opposition.

On 25 August, the conflict between the Constituent Assembly and the Congress openly broke out. Taking advantage of a parliamentary recess, the pro-government constituent majority occupied the Federal Legislative Palace, suspended the sessions of the Congress, reduced its commissions to a minimum and created a delegated commission made up of 23 congressmen who could legislate, but always subject to the veto of the Constituent Assembly in important matters. Congressmen from Democratic Action, Copei and Project Venezuela protested the measure, which they called a coup d'état, and called for an emergency session in the Federal Palace. Aristóbulo Istúriz, president of the Constituent Assembly warned them that "the people would shut them down" if they tried to do so. On 27 August, opposition congressmen tried to enter the Congress but were repelled by Chavista sympathizers, who injured thirty of the first ones when they tried to jump over the fence surrounding the building. The Catholic Church mediated between the Constituent Assembly and the Congress, but although they managed to reach an agreement, the Congress continued to be reduced to its new role of delegated commission, sharing the building with the Constituent. At the time, public opinion interpreted the congressional protests as vain attempts by the discredited traditional political class to stop the changes. At the same time that the Constituent Assembly minimized the Congress, it also created an "emergency commission" to reorganize the Judicial Power. Due to a sentence issued by the Supreme Court at the beginning of the year, the Constituent Assembly could do so as the "original power". The decision was challenged, but when Cecilia Sosa, the president of the high court, resigned after realizing that her colleagues were going to ratify the January decision, as she considered that the rule of law was being violated with the decision:

I believe that by complying with the decree of the National Constituent Assembly that establishes the judicial emergency, the Supreme Court dissolves itself (...) Simply put, the Supreme Court of Justice of Venezuela committed suicide to avoid being assassinated. The result is the same, it is dead.

— Cecilia Sosa, president of the Supreme Court of Venezuela

Although in theory the Constituent Assembly also had the power to intervene the executive branch, the presidential powers, governors and mayors were left untouched, although the Fatherland For All party, then part of the ruling party, considered the idea of removing three opposition governors using the constituent power. For his part, Chávez did not oppose to be ratified by the body, and was sworn in again before the Constituent.

After over three months of work, the Constituent presented its draft constitution on 19 November, which was only opposed by four constituents: Claudio Fermín, Alberto Franceschi, Jorge Olavarría and Virgilio Ávila Vivas, who argued that power was being centralized and that a military estate was going to be formed. A referendum was then called for 15 December in order to approve or reject the text. Democratic Action, Copei, Justice First, Project Venezuela and Fedecamaras campaigned against the approval of the Constitution. Although these forces agreed that a new Magna Carta was necessary in general, they were in complete disagreement with the result, where their representation had been symbolic.

The December 1999 constitutional referendum took place under the same climate of apathy as the one held in April, although the turnout rose to 44.37%. The new votes were endorsed to the opposition to the new constitution, as the Chavismo suffered marginal losses. Although the state of fragmentation of the partisan opposition, which seemed not to have overcome the 1998 defeat, did not allow them to assume an enthusiastic campaign for the "No", the opposition experienced an increase of 142% with respect to the last referendum. However, the majority of Venezuelans continued to show disinterest in the struggle between pro-government and opposition, even when the constitution was at stake.

=== 2000 mega-elections ===
From then until 2003, the opposition parties were eclipsed in their struggle against the government, and ceded political protagonism to various sectors of civil society. Being directly affected by the government's actions, the business community, the unions, the media and even the Catholic clergy took an attitude opposed to them.

Chavez's next electoral challenge was the "2000 mega-elections", these were aimed at electing those who would occupy all popularly elected positions, which numbered more than six thousand. Venezuela was going through economic problems: although the price of oil had tripled since Chávez's arrival, the economy had sunk 7%, unemployment had increased, and foreign investors had moved away from the country. However, in spite of these problems and with the traditional political parties weakened, Chavez's reelection was imminent.

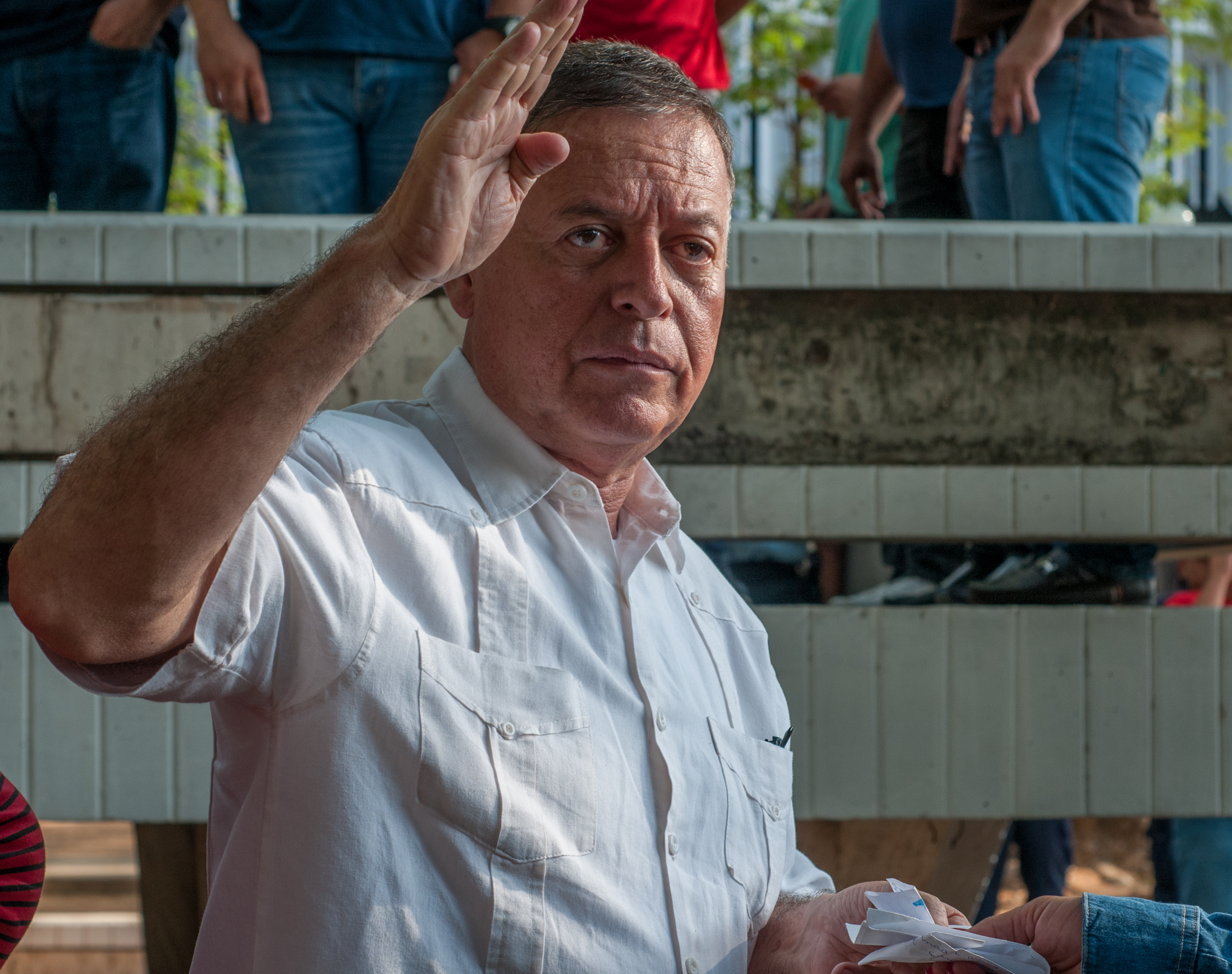
Francisco Arias Cárdenas was one of the main opposition leaders between 2000 and 2002.

Only two politicians, Antonio Ledezma and Claudio Fermín, both former members of Democratic Action and former mayors of the Libertador Municipality of Caracas, made public their intentions to run against the President, both independently. Unexpectedly, in mid-February 2000, Chávez's other partners: Francisco Arias Cárdenas, Jesús Urdaneta and Joel Acosta Chirinos; made a public statement giving Chávez an ultimatum to imprison some members of his government, since they assured that they had irrefutable evidence proving their corruption, including the President of the legislative power, Luis Miquilena, and foreign affairs minister José Vicente Rangel. Chávez's responded by criticizing his former colleagues, whom he reproached for "not having washed the rags at home".

On 15 March Arias Cárdenas, supported by Urdaneta and Acosta Chirinos, registered his candidacy for the presidential election. Upon learning of this, Ledezma withdrew his, but Fermin did not. Miquilena's response was to qualify as "trash" those who abandoned Chávez to support Arias Cárdenas. The new opposition leader received support from La Causa R and a handful of small leftist parties, although not from Democratic Action and Copei. Even though some analysts considered Arias Cardenas more pragmatic than Chávez, others such as Eleazar Díaz Rangel declared that they were basically the same.

Originally scheduled for 28 May, the directors of the National Electoral Council, appointed by the Chavista majority of the Constituent Assembly, proved to be inefficient, and only two days before the elections were to be held, the Supreme Court of Justice suspended them since the Electoral Council was not ready yet. Arias Cárdenas called his supporters to gather in front of the CNE to protest, but they were repelled by a group of Chavistas.

=== Decree 1011 ===
In October 2000, Hugo Chávez promoted the Presidential Decree 1011 (Spanish: Decreto 1011), whose text partially modified the Regulations for the Exercise of the Teaching Profession by creating a new administrative figure, that of itinerant supervisors, which partially modified the Regulations for the Exercise of the Teaching Profession and created the figure of National Itinerant Supervisors in educational institutions, who could be appointed directly by the Minister of Education, Culture and Sports. Their authorities and functions included reporting, accountability directly to the Minister of Education and even the appointment and removal of their directors. The decree also allowed Cuban teachers to participate in literacy plans in Venezuela.

The decree was very controversial and generated the first opposition movement to the government of Hugo Chávez, which mobilized tens of thousands of people from civil society during the rest of the year 2000 to protest against the decree under the slogan "don't mess with my children". Civil groups and private sectors filed nullity actions before the Supreme Court of Justice against the creation of official supervisors; such legal actions were dismissed by the Supreme Court. On 1 April 2001, in the television program Aló Presidente, he asked how the groups would react to the Education Law "if they scream for a decree" which establishes the supervision of schools. He declared that "he who does not owe it does not fear it" and therefore questioned the opposition of those "very small sectors" that participate in mobilizations such as the one carried out on 31 March in Caracas. Despite the insistence with the implementation of the decree, it could not be put into practice due to the opposition and the criticism of the civil society.

=== The 49 Laws ===
Between 2001 and 2003, multiple chavistas started opposing Chávez as well. On 28 July 2001, Pedro Carmona defeats Alberto Cudemus, a businessman close to Chavism, in the elections for President of Fedecámaras. On August 4, Carmona coincides with Chavez at the Venezuelan Military Academy, where the anniversary of the National Guard was being celebrated. According to Carmona, Chávez told he no longer wanted conflicts with Fedecámaras, and they plan a meeting on 22 August at the Miraflores Presidential Palace. At the meeting, Carmona proposes to Chávez a plan to lower unemployment, at that time at 17%, improving conditions in order to increase private investment up to 20% of the GDP in five years, while the latter responds with a plan to strengthen the public sector. A dialogue table was then created between Fedecámaras and the government, the latter represented by Jorge Giordani, Minister of Planning. The meetings did not bring results, despite the fact that they took place once a week and that Chávez was present in one of them. The government continued to elaborate 49 controversial laws without sharing their content with Fedecámaras or its agrarian equivalent, Fedenaga, which its critics argued violated Articles 206 and 211 of the Constitution.

On 13 November, Chavez decrees the 49 laws under the enabling law granted to him by the National Assembly in November 2000, a legal instrument which allowed him to legislate without the approval of the legislative power. Although originally two thirds of the Assembly were controlled by Chavismo, the situation had changed due to the fact that some deputies had become dissident and it was unlikely that Chávez would be able to obtain another enabling law, reason for which Chávez approved the laws the day before his special power expired. The laws included the Organic Hydrocarbons Law, the Fishing Law, the Special Law of Cooperative Associations and the General Ports Law, among others, but the Land and Agrarian Development Law was the most controversial. Under the last law, the Venezuelan government gained the power to take private lands if they exceeded the size limit imposed by law and were classified as latifundiums, or if it considered that they were being exploited below their potential. Additionally, the State now had to approve the owner's use of the land, and all owners were obliged to prove the ownership of their lands before 18 December, under the risk of losing them if they did not do so. According to The Miami Herald, at that time 95% of Venezuelan landowners did not have firm titles at the moment.

Pedro Carmona suspends the dialogue with the national government and calls for an extraordinary assembly on 28 November. On that date he then proposes that a twelve-hour national strike be held on 10 December, and obtains the majority support of the business sector, although also the rejection of Miguel Pérez Abad, president of Fedeindustria. On May 4, the Venezuelan Workers Confederation (CTV in Spanish), the main labor union of the country, joined Fedecámaras. Its general secretary, Carlos Ortega, had defeated the chavista Aristóbulo Istúriz in the CTV elections. The opposition political parties became divided in their opinions on how to overcome the political crisis: Democratic Action insisted in the Assembly on appointing a medical board to prove the President's mental incapacity; Francisco Arias Cárdenas and his deputies called for a consultative referendum, the Movement for Socialism (MAS) asked for calling another Constituent Assembly; Justice First and the Catholic Church asked the government for a change of course. The strike was observed by 90% of the country, becoming Pedro Carmona and Carlos Ortega the opposition leaders.

External videos
- Chávez firing PDVSA executives in national television and blowing a referee whistle, as if to expel them from a football match, 7 April 2002

Tensions worsened on 7 April, when Chávez fired PDVSA President Guaicaipuro Lameda Montero and 5 of the 7 members of the board of directors, mocking each one in national television by name and blowing a referee whistle, as if to expel them from a football match. Chávez accused them of committing serious misconduct and sabotaging the state oil company, and also warned "I have no problem in scraping (firing) all of them, all of them, if all of them have to be scraped". The dismissed executives were Eddie Ramírez, managing director of the subsidiary Palmaven; Juan Fernández, manager of financial planning and control; Horacio Medina, manager of negotiation strategy; Gonzalo Feijoo, senior advisor of refining strategy; Edgar Quijano and Alfredo Gómez, human resources labor advisors, and Carmen Elisa Hernández, project analyst of PDVSA Gas.

=== April 2002 protests and coup attempt ===
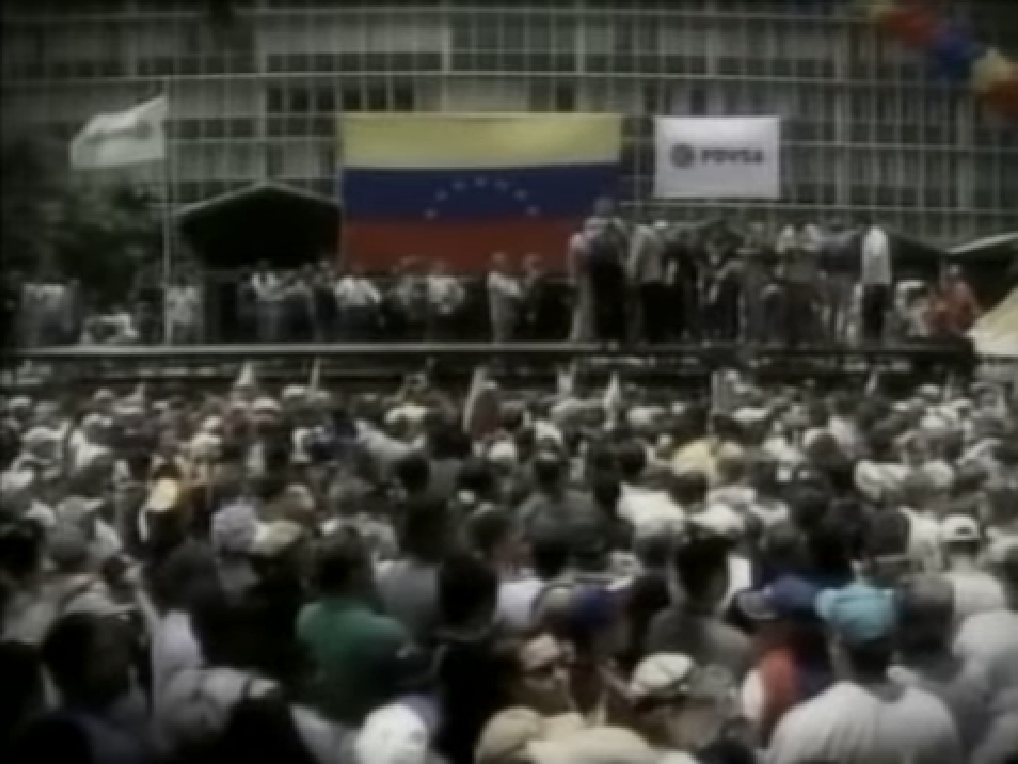
Rally at PDVSA's headquarters in Chuao, Caracas.

On 9 April 2002, the organizations of Fedecámaras, the Venezuelan Workers Confederation and other civil, political and religious associations called for an indefinite general strike. That same day, Chávez meets with generals Efraín Vásquez Velazco and Manuel Rosendo, as well as with PDVSA's President Gastón Parra, Attorney General Isaías Rodríguez and deputies Nicolás Maduro, Ismael García and Cilia Flores. Also present were several Chavista Ministers, governors and mayors, general Francisco Usón, the mayor of West Caracas Freddy Bernal, and the former guerrilla Guillermo García Ponce. Among other things, there was talk of applying the military contingency Plan Ávila, of paying a bonus of one and a half million bolivars to the oil workers who did not join the strike, and even of simulating a traffic congestion on the Francisco Fajardo Highway with chavista sympathizers to make it appear that the strike has not been effective. On 11 April, the third day of the strike, a rally was called for at PDVSA's headquarters in Chuao, Caracas, led by Pedro Carmona, Carlos Ortega and Guaicaipuro Lameda, the rally finally turned into a march, with numbers estimated to be up to one million people, heading to the Miraflores Palace to demand Hugo Chávez to resign from the presidency. While the march was taking place, President Chavez ordered the military to activate Plan Ávila. When the march reached the Llaguno Overpass. Opposition groups and Chavez supporters began to confront each other and were mostly controlled by the Metropolitan Police, between 2:30 p.m. and 3:45 p.m. Several people were shot and killed, both opposition and pro-government demonstrators.

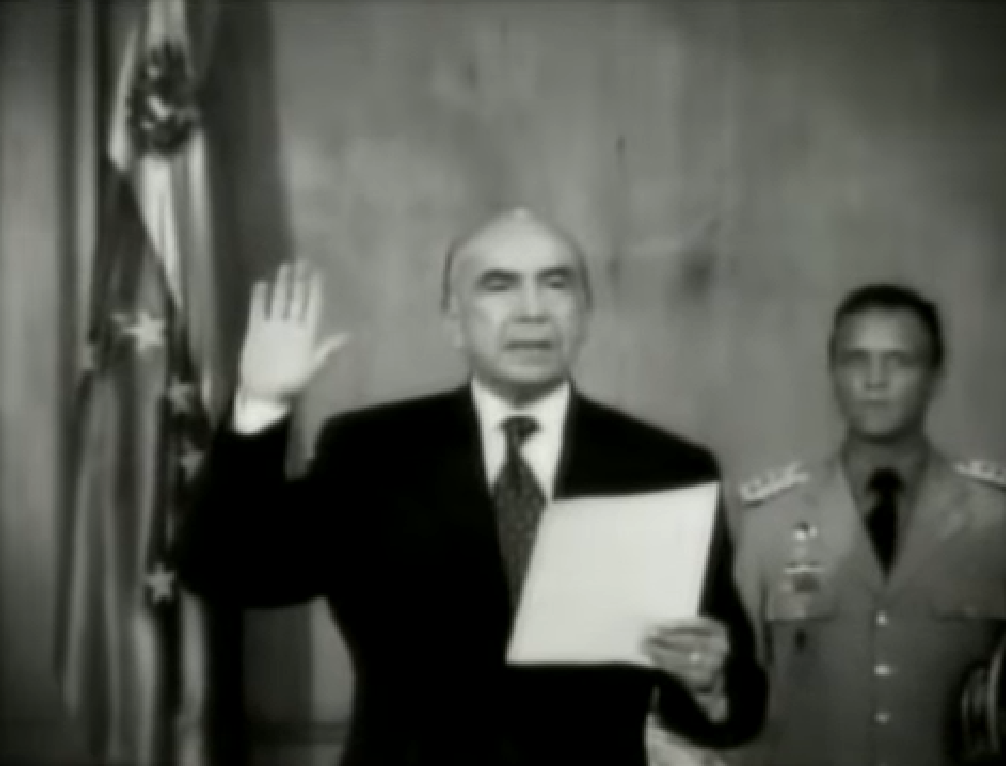
Businessman Pedro Carmona swearing in as president amid the 2002 coup attempt

In the early morning of 12 April, the Military High Command announced through the Minister of Defense, Lucas Rincón Romero, that Chávez had been asked to resign as President of Venezuela, with Rincón declaring that he accepted. Chávez was transferred to Fuerte Tiuna where he was imprisoned for a few hours, there he wrote a letter saying that he had not resigned, after which he was taken by helicopter to the prison in the Orchila Island. By that date, Chavez' sympathizers had gone out to protest in front of the Miraflores Palace and in the Paratroopers Brigade in Maracay.

The same day, Pedro Carmona swore himself in as president of Venezuela, establishing a transitional government that would call for elections in December 2002. His first official act was the dissolution of the National Assembly, the Supreme Tribunal of Justice, the National Electoral Council, the removal of the Attorney General, the Comptroller, and the Ombudsman, all governors, mayors and councilmen, and all diplomatic officials. The act also repealed all of the 49 enabling laws and changed the Constitution, by renaming the country as the Republic of Venezuela, taking away the Bolivarian qualifier. Part of the agenda left by Carmona Estanga in the Miraflores office included a new ministerial cabinet and the controversial Carmona Decree. General Raúl Isaías Baduel opposed Carmona's government and began to actively seek a way to restore Chávez to power.

On 13 April and 14, troops loyal to Chavez succeeded in taking over the Miraflores Palace, and several of his ministers headed a temporary government until Chávez was released. Diosdado Cabello took over the presidency for less than 24 hours, and in the early morning of April 14, Chávez was released from Orchila Island and was reinstated as President of Venezuela.

=== Plaza Altamira Military ===
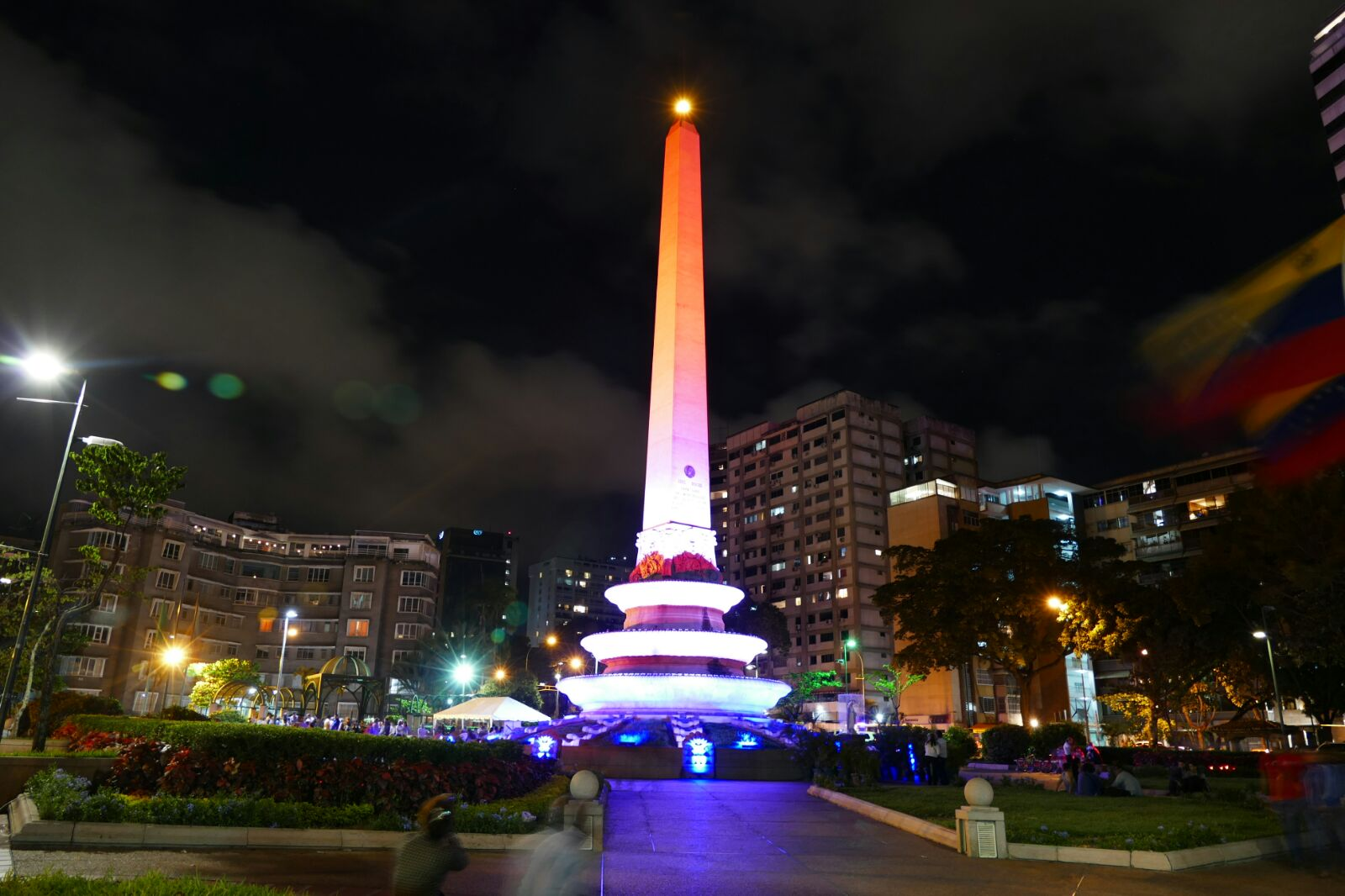
Altamira Square, place where the military protest took place.

On 22 October 2002, a group of fourteen military officers, both active and retired (including some who had been involved in the April coup), spoke out against the government in a pronunciamiento in the Altamira Square, eastern Caracas, declaring the square a "liberated zone" and inviting their fellow soldiers to join them with the aim of achieving Chávez's resignation. The group was widely supported by civil society, and during the course of the protest at least 102 more military personnel joined the group, as well as thousands of opposition demonstrators. On 6 December, waiter João de Gouveia, fired into the crowd gathered in the square, killing three people and wounding 25 others. João was subdued and handed over to the authorities moments later. On 20 February 2003, four other people participating in the rally, including three military personnel, were found dead, after apparently being abducted days earlier in the square.

The government decided to let the protest continue, without repressing it. After several months, the rally lost momentum and failed to achieve its objectives.

=== 2002-2003 general strike ===
On 2 December 2002, days after the creation of a dialogue and agreement table sponsored by the Organization of American States and the Carter Center, Fedecámaras called for a strike on 2 December. Its duration was initially 24 hours, but it was extended day by day until it became an indefinite strike in the middle of the Christmas commercial season. Merchants, businessmen, employees and workers were promised that the strike would only last a few days until Chávez's resignation was achieved, but said resignation did not come.

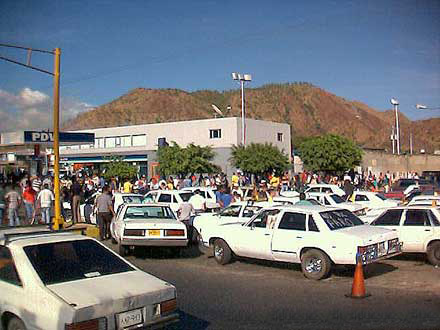
Long lines of vehicles at a gas station on 10 December 2002.

At the beginning, the strike only involved the companies of the employers' association and the unions affiliated to the Workers Federation, but soon PDVSA's directors and employees at the management level decided to support it. As such, the country was practically paralyzed. Only some state-owned companies, public land and air transportation, water, electricity and telephone services, and both the public and private media continued to work, although the latter decided to suspend their regular programming and the broadcasting of advertising, replacing it with political and informative programming 24 hours a day. Political spots were broadcast supporting the continuation or not of the strike and the holding of protests and marches in different parts of the country, promoted by the Coordinadora Democrática opposition coalition or by the government.

On 5 December, the crew of the oil tanker Pilín León declared rebellion and anchored the vessel in the navigation channel of Lake Maracaibo. Most of the national media broadcast closely what was happening on a daily basis regarding the oil strike and other derived events, as well as other media such as newspapers or radio stations, although many ceased their broadcasting and others were censored. The government called in former PDVSA employees and technicians from universities and the Armed Forces in order to get the oil company working again. By the end of December, the objective was practically achieved, which was a hard blow for the promoters of the strike, and the strike weakened as the days went by. In mid-January 2003, the government managed to regain full control of PDVSA. The State decided to dismiss 15,000 employees for uncertain reasons, one of which was that they had been missing work for a long period of time. On 21 December, the tanker Pilín León was recovered and taken to a safe port through the navigation channel of Lake Maracaibo and under the Rafael Urdaneta bridge.

Finally, the opposition stopped the strike. Movements to start a recall referendum started years later.

=== 2004 recall referendum ===
In 2003, Coordinadora Democrática at first demanded a consultative referendum, which was characterized for not being binding. Chávez affirmed that he would only accept the referendum foreseen in the constitution, but the opposition was initially against the option accepted by Chávez, arguing that it had to be held in the middle of the presidential term, mid-2004, and that they would not be willing to wait that long since the country could be plunged into civil unrest. Protests continued between January 2003, and in the following months the government accepted the request and prepared its "No" campaign.

In August 2003, 3.2 million signatures were submitted to summon the referendum. Based on a legal technicality, the petition was rejected by the National Electoral Council (CNE), filled with Chávez allies, calling it flawed, stating that the signatures had been collected prematurely (before the middle of the presidential term), and that the petition had to be redone. In September 2003, the government used a rapid mobilization squad to raid the Electoral Council offices. The Economist reported that the government was punishing citizens who signed the referendum petition. Likewise, the government and some signers denounced threats of dismissal against workers of private businesses that did not prove that they signed against Chávez.

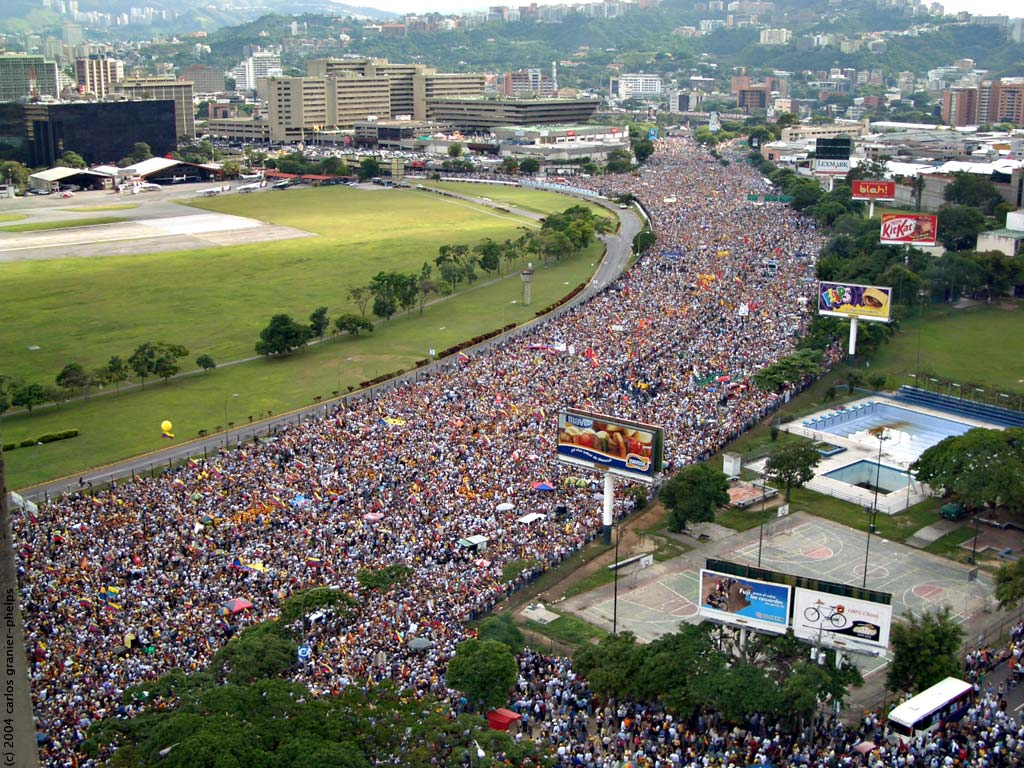
Caracas rally during the 2004 referendum campaign to recall Chávez

In February 2004, on the television program Aló Presidente episode 180, Chávez announced that he had signed a document asking the CNE to provide copies of all the signatures of the petitioners for the referendum, in order to expose the opposition's "mega fraud". The Electoral Council announced that the signatures presented had to be examined a second time, and on 27 February demonstrations to protest against the decision took place in Caracas and fifteen other cities, initially promoted by the Bloque Democrático (Democratic Block), a radical sector of the opposition which rejected the recall referendum as "a trap of the regime". The opposition and government held negotiations and the demonstrations lasted for five days. Nine people were killed during the protests, hundreds were injured and at least 300 were arrested.

The CNE ruled that it would allow a remediation process, which consisted of allowing a five-day period in May 2004 for those whose signatures were being questioned to confirm that they were authentic. At the end of this period, the number of signatures validated by the CNE reached 2,436,830, reaching the minimum number of signatures needed to call the referendum. During these days of signature validation, thousands of fake ID cards and equipment for their manufacture were confiscated in the course of police raids. The opposition argued that the equipment had been maliciously planted, while Chávez supporters argued that it was proof that the opposition had used the equipment to falsify signatures.

The referendum was held on 15 August 2004 and included centers abroad, such as in the United States and Spain, which resulted in Chávez not being recalled.

After the referendum the Tascón List, containing personal data and signatures of those who supported the recall, was subsequently disseminated. People who were on the list were denied government benefits and jobs in the following years.

=== 2005 parliamentary elections ===
The government announced in 2005 the parliamentary elections scheduled for the end of the same year. Since its announcement, the process was highly criticized by Henry Ramos Allup (secretary general of Democratic Action), Teodoro Petkoff (Movement for Socialism) and Manuel Rosales (A New Era). Democratic Action withdrew from the election on 28 November, six days before the electoral process, showing its distrust of the electoral body, the National Electoral Council (CNE). According to Ramos Allup, the fingerprint scanners allowed the electoral agencies to know which was the choice made by the voter, as demonstrated by computer technicians in the last few days before the CNE and international observers. He also denounced that the access to the software that registers the votes and the electoral roll was restricted to opponents and observers. On 30 November, COPEI, Project Venezuela, Justice First, A New Era and Movement for Socialism all withdrew from the elections too. The government did not postpone the elections and they were held on 4 December. The opposition managed that most of the voters abstained from voting in the process, which had a turnout of 25%. The ruling party took the majority of the parliament, achieving an absolute majority to legislate. In February 2006 the Organization of American States released a report expressing concern about the Venezuelans distrust towards the electoral authorities. Chavez accused the OAS of stigmatizing the results of the elections and called the report as a "dirty document".

=== 2006 presidential elections ===
With the upcoming 2006 presidential elections, opposition leaders debated on how they could choose a single candidate. Julio Borges, of Justice First, proposed holding primary elections for August 2006. Among the candidates were: Manuel Rosales (A New Era), Teodoro Petkoff (independent), Sergio Omar Calderón (Copei), Wiliam Ojeda (Un Solo Pueblo), Cecilia Sosa (Federal Republican Party), Enrique Tejera París (independent) and Vicente Brito (Republican Movement). The main candidates, Julio Borges and Teodoro Petkoff, agreed to withdraw from the pre-candidacy to endorse Manuel Rosales, based on his opinion polling support. More than thirty political and civil organizations publicly expressed their support to Rosales. The trade union bureau of Democratic Actions, as well as its regional components and many party leaders, announced that they would support the single opposition candidate in the December elections. Rosales received 36.91% of the vote in the presidential election.

=== 2007 RCTV and referendum protests ===
Demonstration in front of the RCTV building in Caracas.

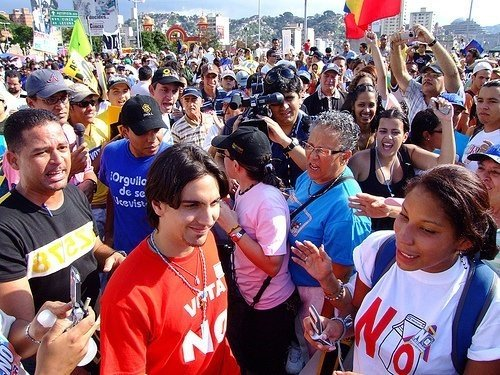
Members of the student movement, including Freddy Guevara, in the "NO" campaign.

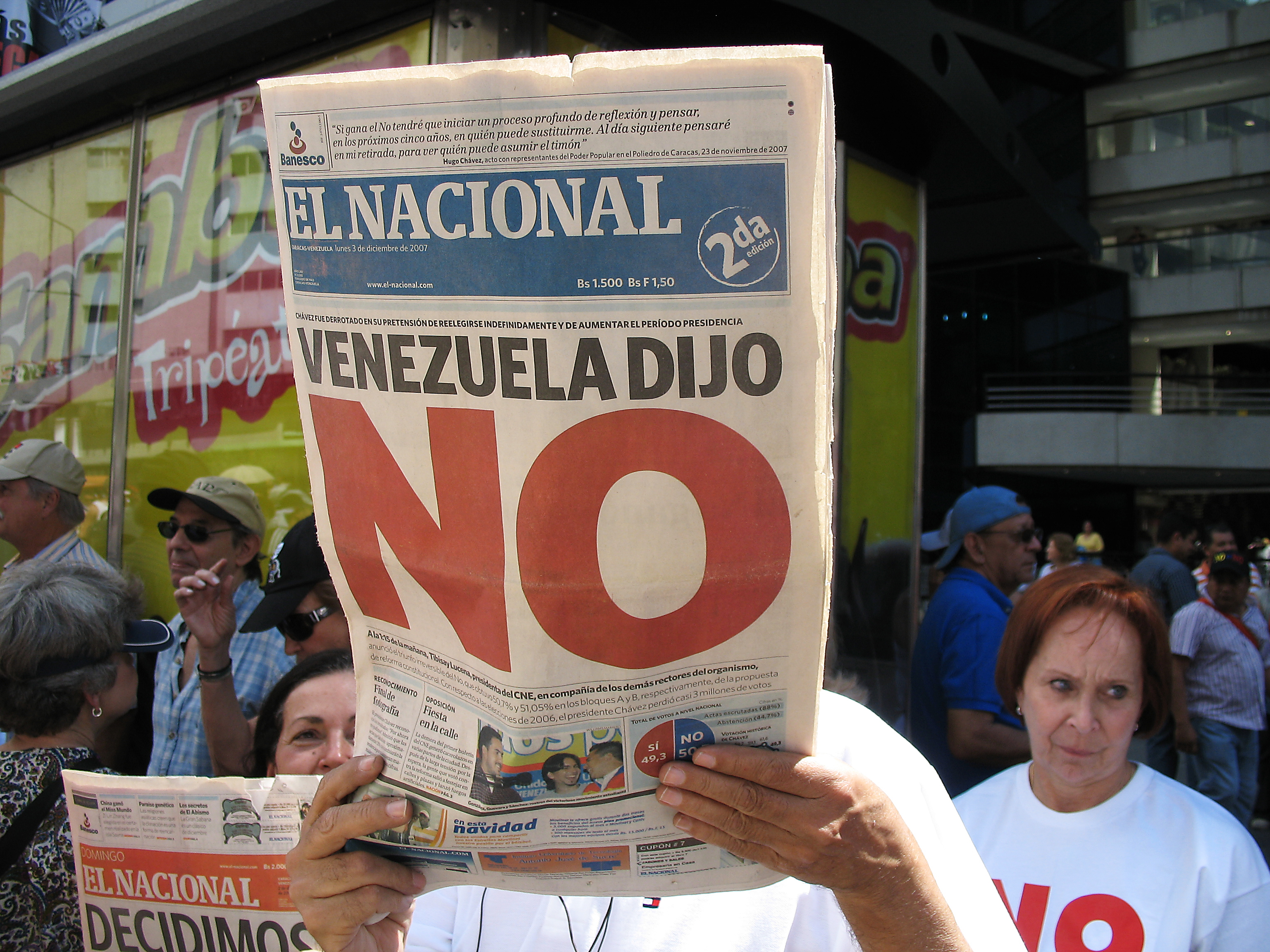
A Venezuelan reads the front page of El Nacional newspaper after the referendum results.

On 28 December 2006, Chávez informed that he would not renew Radio Caracas Televisión's (RCTV) concession, which was due to expire on 27 May 2007, and therefore the signal had to stop programming on that day. The government argued that the refusal to renew was due to the position taken by RCTV during the 2002 coup d'état. RCTV's directors declared that the channel's concession did not expire until 2021, calling the measure an abuse by the government, and demonstrations in support of the channel took place. Supreme Tribunal of Justice rejected an appeal that argued that the license revocation was illegal. On 19 May, over 30,000 people gathered in Caracas to protest the decision, while there were also marches in Maracaibo, Puerto La Cruz, Valencia and other main cities in the country. A march in favor of the freedom of expression was organized on 21 May in Caracas, led by students and journalists. The Supreme Tribunal later reaffirmed Chávez's decision that RCTV had to end its transmissions by 27 May.

Protests continued in the following days and thousands of demonstrators protested outside the CONATEL headquarters on May 28 and 29. Around twenty students had to be hospitalized in Caracas due to tear gas inhalation, and on May 28 four people were shot and wounded in Valencia.

On 15 August 2007, Chávez presented 33 articles before the National Assembly, which was in charge of discussing the constitutional reform and once sanctioned, it was to be sent to the National Electoral Council (CNE). The proposals included turning Venezuela into a socialist nation and indefinite re-election of the officeholders. The CNE received the project on 2 November, which in turn was presented to the Venezuelan public in two blocks of articles, each one with the options "YES" and "NO" to either accept or reject the request.

The reform was rejected by the majority of the opposition leadership and the opposition started the campaign for the "NO". At first, Democratic Action called for abstention, called to vote for the "NO" at the end five days before the proposal. The political parties that registered in favor of the "NO" were Primero Justicia, A New Era, For Social Democracy, COPEI, Movement For Socialism, Democratic Republican Union among others.

The referendum results rejected the constitutional reforms. After the results were known, members of the A New Era party pointed out the need for national reconciliation, Manuel Rosales said that a dialogue process with Hugo Chávez should be initiated and also proposed that the aspects considered positive of the project be approved, including a social fund for the workers of the informal economy. Leopoldo López referred that it was the moment to end with the division of Venezuelans and that from the moment of the results, work for inclusion, peace and tolerance should begin.

Hugo Chávez reacted by calling the results a "shit victory" for the opposition, saying "Know how to manage your victory, because you are already filling it with shit. It's a shitty victory and ours, call it a defeat, but it's one of courage." He also said that it was possible to summon a second referendum, stating "We are going on the offensive again. (...) We launched the first offensive for the great constitutional reform, but do not think it is over. Get ready, because a second offensive towards the constitutional reform will come", and that "If signatures are collected, this reform can be submitted to referendum again under other conditions, at another time, in this same place called Venezuela".

=== 2008 regional elections ===
In early January 2008, some opposition political parties expressed their willingness to sign a unitary agreement to run in the regional elections of November of that year. On 23 January, in commemoration of the 50th anniversary of the return of democracy to Venezuela, the coalition of National Unity (later known as the Democratic Unity Roundtable) was created, formed by the political parties A New Era (UNT), Justice First (PJ), Democratic Action (AD), Copei, Movement For Socialism (MAS), Radical Cause, Project Venezuela (PRVZL), Fearless People's Alliance (ABP) and Popular Vanguard (VP), reached an agreement committing to present joint candidates in all the states and municipalities of the country. Other political parties representing the more radical opposition such as Alianza Popular, Comando Nacional de la Resistencia and Frente Patriótico denounced at the beginning that they were excluded from the agreement. With the document, called National Unity Agreement, they expected to seek unitary candidacies for the regional elections, besides proposing ten national objectives of their "vision of the country". The agreement also created a set of rules regarding decisions, including decisions being made by a majority of 3/5ths of members or 70% of the popular vote during election processes, the process to determine a joint candidate either through majority or a primary election and a unified policy framework. Many For Social Democracy (Podemos) leaders expressed their support to the presentation of joint candidacies with the Unity, such as Ricardo Gutiérrez and Ernesto Paraqueima, announcing that they would support the candidacies of the above-mentioned agreement for governorships and mayorships. Ismael García, secretary general of Podemos and deputy for Aragua, announced on 29 April the support of his party to opposition candidates in the states of Lara and Miranda as well as in the Metropolitan District of Caracas for the regional elections. The elections were held on 28 November 2008. The PSUV ruling party obtained 17 of the 22 governorships, representing 52% of the votes, while the opposition obtained 5 governorships, representing 41% of the votes.

=== 2009 referendum ===
On 8 June 2009, the National Unity Agreement was restructured to form the Democratic Unity Roundtable (MUD), which is organized into 11 work units: relations with civil society, strategy, programs, human rights, decentralization, social affairs, international affairs, organization, mobilization and electoral issues. The MUD proposes to strengthen the Venezuelan democratic system, guarantee human rights, consolidate national sovereignty, achieve a productive, just and free society, and the highest level of well-being for its citizens, all based on the precepts of the Venezuelan Constitution. On 22 April 2010, they presented the programmatic proposals of the Unity Table, under the name of "100 solutions for the people", which broadened the political and social content of the opposition coalition.

The opposition grouped within the National Unity coalition, as in the 2007 referendum process, maintained a position totally opposed to the approval of an amendment on the extension of the presidential term or immediate reelection. One of the first opponents to refer to the possibility of a constitutional amendment was Henry Ramos Allup, who assured that four constitutional changes would be attempted: the first one referring to reelection, another one to create the figure of regional vice presidents, in addition to a third amendment to give constitutional rank to the Bolivarian Militia and to grant the power to the executive to appoint the magistrates of the Supreme Tribunal of Justice, as well as the members of the Citizen Power, (the Attorney General, the Ombudsman and the Comptroller General).

The then leader of the opposition party, Manuel Rosales, said that it was an insult to call for another election because "the collectivity is overwhelmed by so many problems and also by the high cost of living and inflation" and also because the proposal had already been rejected a year ago. After the official announcement, other opposition parties such as Acción Democrática (AD), Primero Justicia (PJ), Copei, Podemos and MAS, rejected the proposal as well. Leaders of Radical Cause rejected the intention of reelection, considering it unconstitutional, although they also expressed that the best way to defeat it would be through the vote and demonstrations. On 6 December 2008, they announced the formation of the "National Command for the No", but some of the opposition leaders such as Omar Barboza and Julio Borges, from UNT and PJ, respectively, indicated that they would try legal actions for considering the constitutional amendment initiative as unconstitutional and antidemocratic.

The official results indicated that the "Yes" option (to approve the amendment) obtained 54% of the votes, and that the "No" option (to reject the amendment) obtained 45% of the votes. Movimiento Estudiantil and several opposition parties acknowledged the results of the CNE, but denounced the advantageism of the forces supporting the "Yes". Omar Barboza, Tomás Guanipa (leader of Justice First), Ismael García for PODEMOS, Freddy Guevara (metropolitan councilman), and student leader David Smolansky, among other opposition figures, acknowledged the results.

=== 2010 parliamentary elections ===
Seats distribution after the 2010 parliamentary elections.

For the 2010 legislative elections, a new block of parties joined the coalition, including Podemos, MIN Unidad and Red Flag, among others. Most of them presented unitary candidacies, except for the parties Fuerza Liberal, Democracia Renovadora, Movimiento Laborista and Venezuela de Primera, which despite belonging to the Democratic Unity Roundtable (MUD) did not support all the candidacies. Contrary to the case were the parties PANA, Conde, PMV, which although they are not formal members of the coalition, did support all their candidacies. The Fatherland for All party, after breaking alliance with the United Socialist Party of Venezuela (PSUV) ruling party, decided not to join the MUD coalition but to run its own independent candidates, becoming the third political force in the country with two elected deputies after receiving a total of 3.14% of the national vote.

The MUD obtained 47.22% of the votes, but did not obtain the majority with 65 seats. The PSUV obtained 98 seats after received 48.13% of the votes due to gerrymandering. However, this time it obtained a simple majority, unlike 2005 when it held an absolute majority.

=== 2012 presidential elections ===
The opposition discussed the possibility of participating in the election with a single electoral card in order to avoid the dispersion of the vote. Among the main proponents of this idea were Copei, MAS, Causa R, Democratic Action and Fearless People Alliance; while A New Era and Justice First, the two opposition parties with the highest vote in the last elections, did not support the proposal. However, on 30 July 2011 they announced that they had unanimously agreed to use a unitary card, only for the presidential election. Henrique Capriles, founder of Justice First, was chosen as the opposition presidential candidate for the 2012 presidential election. During his campaign, he also appealed to disillusioned chavista voters.

== Maduro presidency ==
=== 2013 presidential elections ===
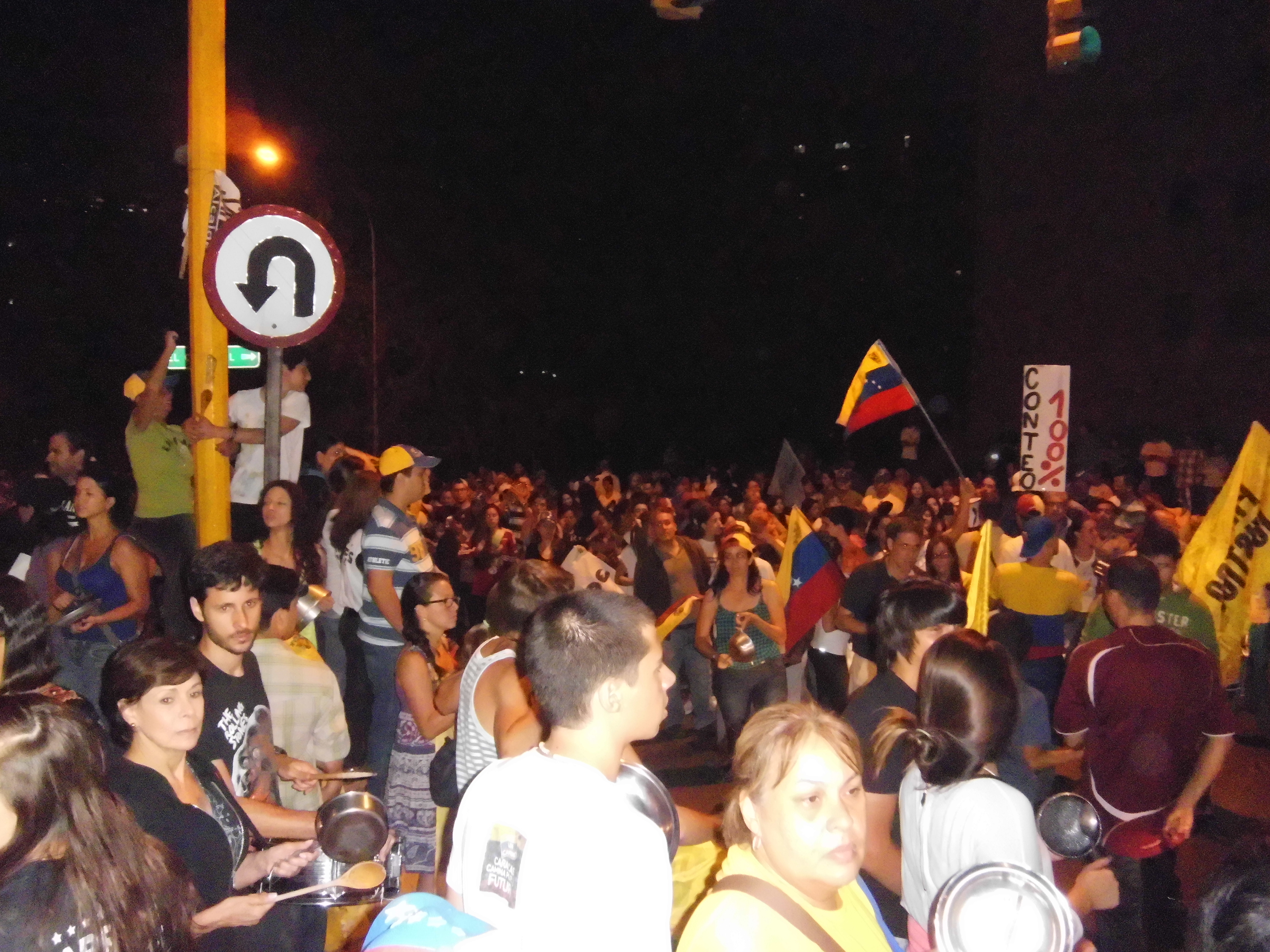
Cacerolazos protesting the Electoral Council results of the 2013 presidential election

Following the death of Hugo Chávez, Capriles was also a candidate for the 2013 presidential election, where the pro-government candidate Nicolás Maduro was declared winner by a narrow margin. The opposition denounced irregularities during the process, and Capriles' campaign command said that they detected at least 3,500 irregularities during the voting process. The opposition demanded a total vote recount, a request also made by National Electoral Council (CNE) rector Vicente Díaz and which was supported by the governments of Spain, United States, France, Paraguay, and the Secretary General of the OAS, José Miguel Insulza. Nicolás Maduro accepted the audit proposed by the opposition but was rejected by the CNE, which declared that the process was automated and that the proposed audit could not be carried out in the proposed terms, arguing that it was not foreseen in the legal system.

The President of the National Assembly, Diosdado Cabello, announced that he would withhold the salaries of those deputies who questioned the legitimacy of Nicolás Maduro as president, and in the 16 April parliamentary session he prevented said deputies from speaking. During the session, opposition deputy William Dávila (Democratic Action, Mérida state) was hit with a microphone by a pro-government deputy, for which he needed 16 stitches.

Capriles formally presented his request on 17 April, with all the corresponding complaints and the petition for the total verification of the tally sheets. The CNE accepted the verification "in second phase" of 46% of the voting boxes not randomly audited at first. However, this audit was not endorsed by Capriles, arguing that the same "should have been carried out together with a review of the voting notebooks", and proceeded to challenge the electoral process for which reason the process was challenged before the Supreme Tribunal of Justice.

During the 30 April parliamentary session, Diosdado Cabello ordered the removal of the microphones from the seats of the opposition deputies. Upon arriving at the floor, the opposition legislators had to wait for the pro-government deputies to take their seats. After almost three hours of delay in the beginning of the session, the microphones were returned and less than half an hour of the agenda was completed, Cabello prevented the opposition legislators from participating again in the debate and silenced William Dávila. Opposition deputies responded by sounding airhorns and vuvuzelas as a protest and displayed a banner reading "Coup to the Parliament".

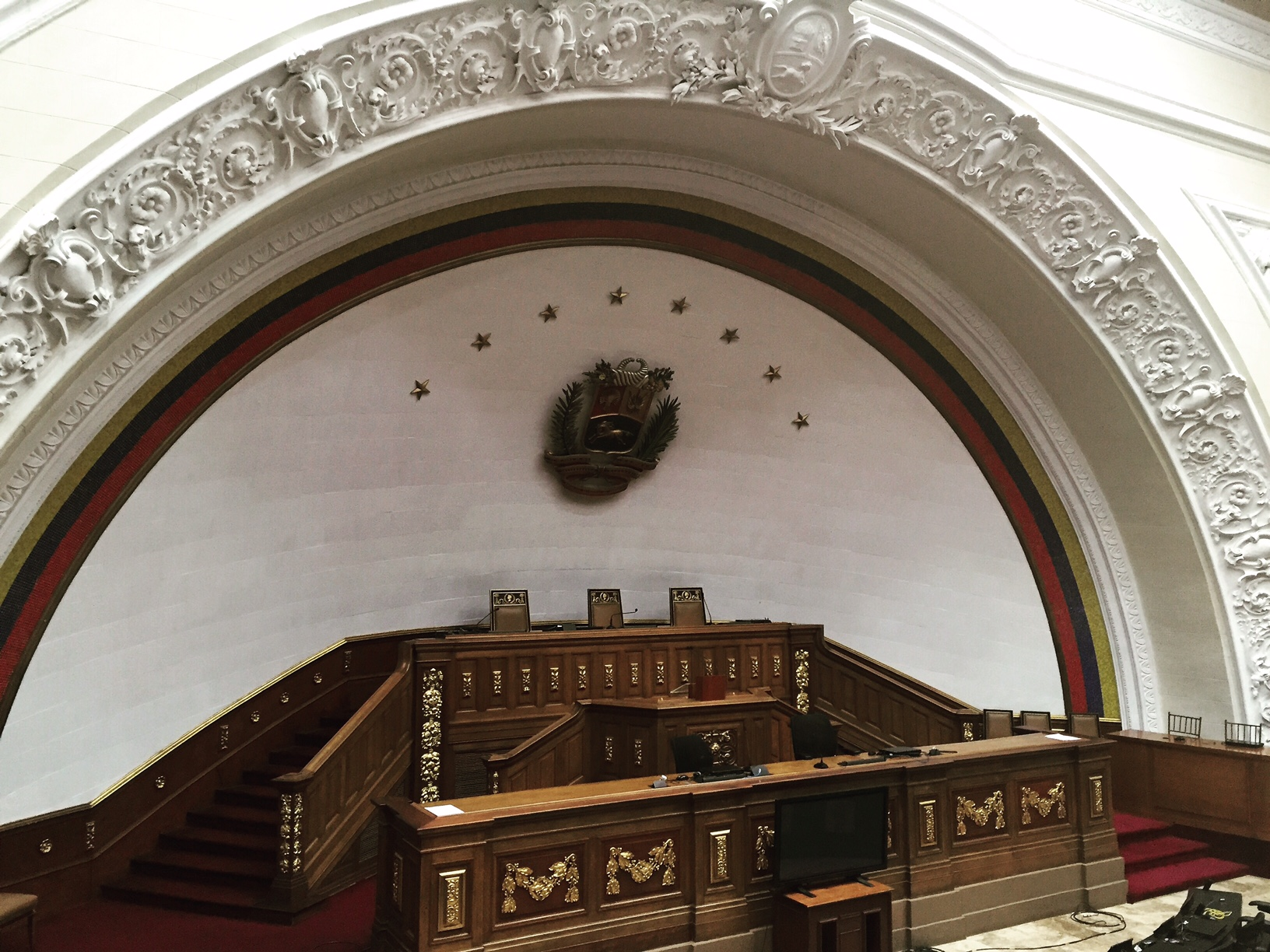
The sessions hemicycle of the Venezuelan National Assembly, where a brawl between deputies over the election results broke out on 30 April 2013

A brawl started; ANTV, the Assembly official television channel of the, focused the camera shots on the roof of the chamber and broadcast the audio of the Assembly Secretary, Iván Zerpa, when he was reading the approval of new additional credits.

Opposition deputy Ismael García said that the doors of the chamber were closed and that independent media outlets had no access to the Assembly hall. The fight lasted several minutes and was reconstructed by amateur videos taken by the opposition legislators. At the beginning, the pro-government deputies snatched the banner and attacked the opposition deputies. Deputy María Corina Machado went up to complain to Diosdado Cabello when she was pulled by the hair, thrown to the floor and kicked in the face by pro-government deputy Nancy Ascencio, who minutes before had attacked her. Machado stated that Cabello laughed while the opponents were being attacked.

Among the most badly injured were Julio Borges, who was hit in the left cheekbone, and María Corina Machado, who suffered a deviated nasal septum. Américo de Grazia, deputy for the Bolívar state, had to be hospitalized after being hit by five pro-government supporters and falling down stairs. Opposition deputies Ismael García, Nora Bracho, Homero Ruiz and Eduardo Gómez Sigala also suffered minor contusions. The United Socialist Party of Venezuela reported as injured its deputies Odalis Monzón, Nancy Ascencio, Maigualida Barrera and Claudio Farías. However, amateur videos taken by the opposition recorded that the same deputies promoted the attack against the opponents.

Maduro did not have the charisma of his predecessor and as a result, began to lose support among his base. Some opposition groups questioned that Maduro was born in Venezuela, saying that this would disqualify him from holding the presidential office in Venezuela. By 2014, official declarations by the Venezuelan government officials shared four different birthplaces of Maduro. Opposition followers argued that Maduro cited Article 227 of the Venezuelan constitution, which states that "To be chosen as president of the Republic it is required to be Venezuelan by birth, not having another nationality." The pro-government Supreme Tribunal of Justice ruled in October 2016 that Maduro was born in Venezuela The ruling did not reproduce Maduro's birth certificate but it quoted the Colombian Vice minister of foreign affairs, Patti Londoño Jaramillo, who stated that "no related information was found, nor civil registry of birth, nor citizenship card that allows to infer that president Nicolás Maduro Moros is a Colombian national". In January 2018, the opposition-appointed Supreme Tribunal of Justice of Venezuela in exile decreed the 2013 presidential elections null after reportedly obtaining evidence that Nicolás Maduro was ineligible to be elected and to hold the office of the presidency, citing that he was born in Colombia.

=== 2014 protests ===
In February 2014, amid an economic decline and high crime, Popular Will founder Leopoldo López started La Salida, campaign whose objective was to "find a peaceful, democratic and constitutional solution to the government of Nicolás Maduro". The government issued an arrest warrant against López, who turned himself in on 18 February and was imprisoned.

Seats distribution after the 2015 parliamentary elections.

=== 2015 legislative elections and recall referendum project ===
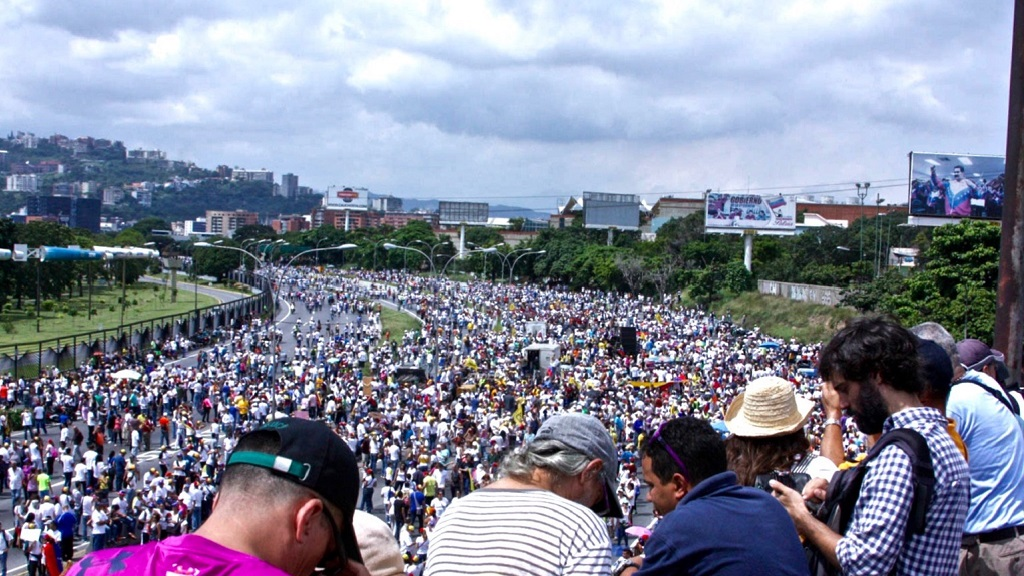
Opposition protestors in 2016

The opposition won a majority in the National Assembly in the 2015 parliamentary election. The lame duck chavista National Assembly proceeded to pack the Supreme Tribunal of Justice prior to its departure.

The following year, the opposition started a project to summon a referendum to recall Maduro. In September 2016, the Constitutional Chamber of said Supreme Tribunal of Justice declared null and void all acts emanating from the National Assembly, including any laws enacted, and declared the Assembly "in contempt, and on 20 October the signatures collection to summon a recall referendum was suspended by the National Electoral Council. In response, the National Assembly declared the "rupture of constitutional order" in Venezuela in an extraordinary session. The suspension of the referendum was condemned by the OAS Secretary General and eleven OAS member states published an open letter expressing their concern.

By 25 October, the National Assembly debated the possibility of impeaching Maduro for suspending recall referendum, although the Venezuela constitution does not grant this power to the legislative branch. Maduro would later bypass the opposition-led National Assembly by creating the 2017 Constituent National Assembly.

=== 2018 presidential elections ===
On 25 January 2018, the Constitutional Chamber of the Supreme Tribunal of Justice ordered the CNE to exclude the Democratic Unity Roundtable (MUD) from the ballot validation process, making it impossible for the participation of the ballot card in the presidential elections. Hours before, Tania D'Amelio, one of the CNE rectors, declared that the MUD could not participate in the process for having open judicial proceedings in seven states. In the same month, the main parties of the MUD, Democratic Action, Popular Will and Progressive Advance, as well their spokespersons, announced that they would participate in the 2018 presidential elections. The same month, politicians Juan Pablo Guanipa, Andrés Velásquez, Claudio Fermín, Henry Ramos Allup and Henri Falcón announced their candidacy by calling for a primary within the coalition.

The National Constituent Assembly called for a snap election through a decree, whereas the presidential elections were originally scheduled for December 2018. In the following days, the pre-candidates requested the postponement of the elections as provided in the constitution. Opposition leaders asked the government to ensure electoral guarantees in order to participate, and if no agreement was reached, the MUD would rule out going to the presidential elections. On 21 February, the MUD coalition parties, except Avanzada Progresista, reached an agreement not to participate in the elections, declaring in a statement that "The premature event without guarantees (...) is only a show by the government to pretend a legitimacy it does not have".

Three of the five presidential candidates (Nicolás Maduro, Henri Falcón and Javier Bertucci) later signed an electoral guarantees agreement that included the elimination of the "red points" of control of Chavismo, international observation and the return of the voting centers changed during the election of the Constituent Assembly and the 2017 regional elections. The agreement was questioned and rejected by the non-government organizations such as Voto Joven, Cepaz and the Global Observatory on Communication and Democracy. Beatriz Borges, the director of Cepaz, declared that "the electoral guarantees agreement is a deceit to the citizenry, since it contemplates points already established in the Law and which the CNE has not complied with".

Presidential candidates Henri Falcón, Javier Bertucci and Luis Alejandro Ratti warned about the violation of the guarantees foreseen in the document. However, Tibisay Lucena, the president of the CNE, assured on 2 May that the Agreement of Electoral Guarantees was fully complied with. During a visit to Delta Amacuro, Maduro delivered eight boats, nine ambulances and reopened the Tucupita airport "Antonio Diaz", among other announcements, violating the electoral law, which prohibits the use of public resources for campaigning, and one of the prerogatives included in the electoral guarantees agreement. On 8 May he violated the regulation again in a campaign act in Amazonas state by promising to supply fuel to the state in exchange for votes.

Maduro was declared winner in the election results. Candidate Henri Falcón rejected the election before the official announcement of the results. The CNE rector Luis Emilio Rondón, announced his rejection of the results, considering them "clearly flawed" and supporting the complaints by candidates Henri Falcón and Javier Bertucci, among which he highlighted the ruling party "red points" near voting centers, the advantageism that prevailed since the calling of the process in January and the use of state resources to benefit the winning option in the national system of public media. Rondón offered the candidates office of the Commission of Political Participation and Financing so that they could present the irregularities they announced in order to "organize the claims corresponding to the clarification of all these aspects that tarnish the electoral process".

The opposition National Assembly approved a statement "to disavow the alleged results (...) and especially the alleged election of Nicolás Maduro Moros as President of the Republic, who must be considered as a usurper". The European Union, the Organization of American States, the Lima Group and nations including Australia and the United States rejected the electoral process as well.

=== Presidential crisis ===
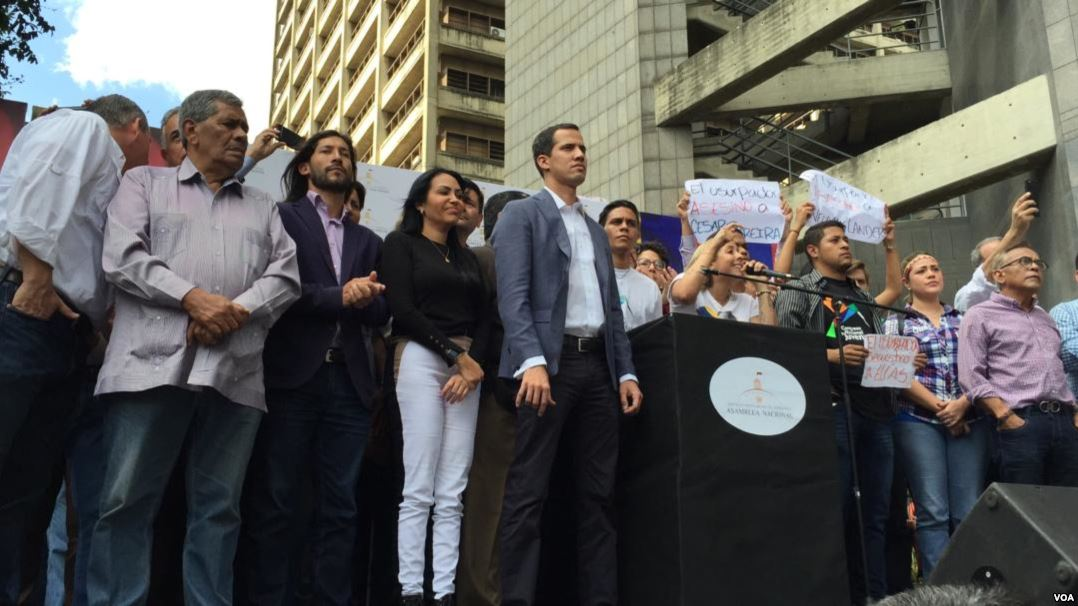
Juan Guaidó surrounded by members of the opposition during the public assembly in 2019

In December 2018, Popular Will politician Juan Guaidó was named president of the National Assembly and began to form a transitional government. Guaidó was declared interim president of Venezuela on 23 January 2019, beginning a presidential crisis. The United States, European allies and Latin American countries recognized Guiadó as president as well. Guaidó laid down three objectives: "Cessation of usurpation, transitional government, and free elections". Establishing a government in Venezuela required three crucial elements: "the people, the international community, and the armed forces." Guaidó led an attempted uprising against Maduro with a group of military defectors on 30 April 2019, during which Leopoldo López fled house arrest. The uprising ultimately failed.

In December 2022, three of the four main opposition political parties (Justice First, Democratic Action and A New Era) backed and approved a reform to dissolve the interim government and create a commission of five members to manage foreign assets, as deputies sought a united strategy ahead of the next Venezuelan presidential election scheduled for 2024, stating that the interim government had failed to achieve the goals it had set.

=== 2020 parliamentary elections ===
In 2020, twenty seven opposition parties announced that they would not participate in the parliamentary elections through a public statement and said that such elections would be fraudulent. The Supreme Tribunal of Justice appointed ad-hoc boards through judicial decisions, intervening the Democratic Action, Popular Will and Justice First parties, although the judicial decision applied to the latter was removed. The opposition rejected the judicial interventions.

The Communist Party of Venezuela broke its ties of support to the government of Nicolás Maduro and then became part of the Popular Revolutionary Alternative, a coalition of leftist parties and movements critical of the government's policies. During the electoral campaign, coalition leaders and candidates were victims of arrests, physical attacks and even received death threats.

=== Second recall referendum project ===
In 2022, one of the main projects of the opposition was a recall referendum against the Maduro government. The National Electoral Council ordered the collection of the required signatures, 20% of the electoral registry, to be carried out in a single day, the equivalent of having to collect four million signatures in twelve hours, which resulted in not reaching the required signatures, the referendum being declared inadmissible and making it impossible to organize another recall for Nicolás Maduro's second term.

=== 2024 presidential elections ===
In October 2023, the national government and the Unitary Platform signed the Barbados Agreement for the "promotion of political rights and electoral guarantees" in advance of the 2024 election. The 'Unitary Platform' refers to the coalition of opposition parties in Venezuela. In the 2023 Unitary Platform presidential primaries, the Venezuelan opposition selected María Corina Machado as their candidate for the 2024 presidential elections. Machado is a conservative politician who centered her campaign on the promise of making Venezuela safer and more prosperous in order to bring home family members who have fled the country. Machado was disqualified from holding office in Venezuela in June 2023 when the Comptroller General of the Republic accused Machado of fraud and tax violations. The Unitary Platform then designated diplomat Edmundo González Urrutia as its new candidate in March 2024.

The outcome of this election was contested between the government and the opposition parties. Venezuela's National Electoral Council declared Maduro the winner of the July 2024 presidential election, while the González campaign asserted that González won the election by over two-thirds of the votes, citing tally sheets from polling stations along with exit polls and quick counts conducted on election day. The United States and many European countries recognized González as the winner of the Venezuelan election. In September 2024, González flew to Spain to seek asylum after receiving an arrest warrant from the Venezuelan authorities. Maduro and his colleagues have threatened to arrest other opposition members as well.

Armed civilians mounted efforts to prevent citizens, election officials, polling station authorities, and journalists from accessing voting centers. The National Electoral Council (CNE) reportedly refused to transmit the results of the tally sheets to some opposition authorities. Citizens awaiting election results outside of some voting locations were attacked by armed civilians, leaving one person dead and several wounded. Protests erupted throughout the country following the National Electoral Council's announcement of the election results, leading to over 2,400 mass arrests and at least 24 killings of opposition advocates. Human Rights Watch reported that Venezuelan authorities and pro government groups known as "colectivos" have committed these killings, arbitrary detentions, and persecution. Venezuelan NGOs and political parties have denounced the use of disinformation, death threats, and physical attacks by Chavismo supporters and by the National Liberation Army (ELN), a far-left Colombian guerrilla group, on opposition candidates.

== Rodríguez acting presidency ==
Following Maduro's ousting from power on 3 January 2026, during the United States intervention in Venezuela nicknamed Operation Absolute Resolve, opposition organized its first major protest against the acting President Rodríguez on 27 January 2026.

== Opposition parties and organizations ==
=== Leadership ===
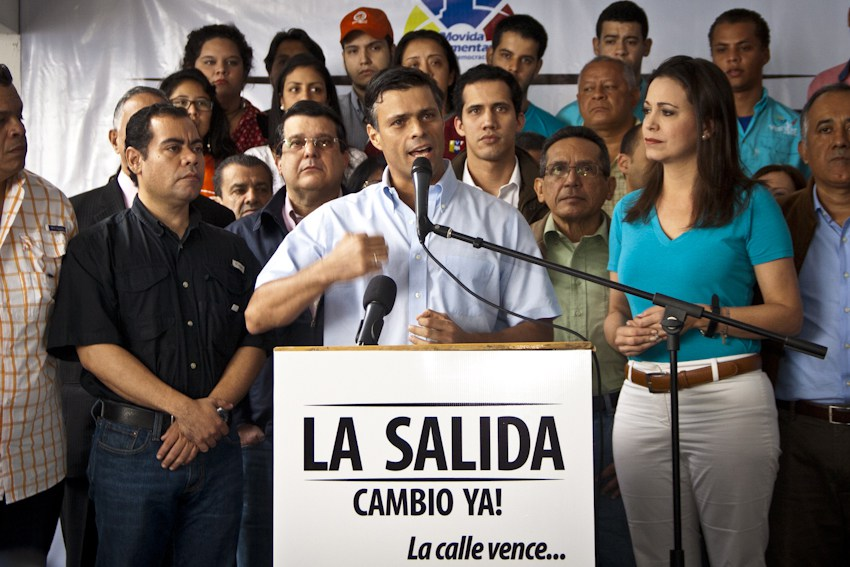
Prominent Venezuelan opposition leaders Leopoldo López and María Corina Machado presenting La Salida. Juan Guaidó is behind.

In 2002, Pedro Carmona and Carlos Ortega briefly provided leadership for the opposition, and Henrique Capriles served as its leader during his candidacies in the 2012 and 2013 presidential elections. Following the opposition winning the majority in the 2015 parliamentary election, the National Assembly of Venezuela assumed leadership of the opposition. Leopoldo López ran as the opposition candidate in 2014. Juan Guaidó was the leader of the opposition during the presidential crisis, though he lost support as the opposition failed to achieve its objectives under his mandate. Into the 2024 presidential elections, María Corina Machado was chosen as leader of the opposition. Edmundo González became the 2024 opposition candidate following the national government's banning of Machado's campaign.

Year	Leader	Political party	Event/Election	Position
1998	Henrique Salas Römer	Project Venezuela	1998 presidential elections	Presidential candidate
2000-2002	Francisco Arias Cárdenas	Radical Cause	2000 general elections	Presidential candidate
2002	Pedro Carmona	Independent	2002 coup attempt	President of Fedecámaras De facto President of Venezuela
2002-2003	Carlos Ortega	Independent	2002-2003 general strike	President of the Venezuelan Workers Confederation Leader of the 2002-2003 general strike
2004	Without defined leadership		2004 Venezuelan protests, 2004 recall referendum	—
2005	Without defined leadership		2005 parliamentary elections	—
2006	Manuel Rosales	A New Era	2006 presidential election	Presidential candidate
2007	Without defined leadership		2007 RCTV protests	Movimiento estudiantil
2007	Without defined leadership		2007 constitutional referendum	Movimiento estudiantil
2010	Without defined leadership		2010 parliamentary elections	—
2012	Henrique Capriles	Justice First	2012 presidential elections	Presidential candidate
2013	Henrique Capriles	Justice First	2013 presidential elections and 2013 Venezuelan presidential election protests	Presidential candidate
2014	Leopoldo López	Popular Will	La Salida and 2014 Venezuelan protests	Presidential pre-candidate in the 2013 presidential election and MUD leader during the 2014 Venezuelan protests.
2014	María Corina Machado	Come Venezuela	La Salida and 2014 Venezuelan protests	Presidential pre-candidate in the 2013 presidential election and MUD leader during the 2014 Venezuelan protests.
2014	Antonio Ledezma	Fearless People's Alliance	La Salida and 2014 Venezuelan protests	Mayor of the Metropolitan District of Caracas and MUD leader during the 2014 Venezuelan protests.
2016	Henry Ramos Allup	Democratic Action	2015 parliamentary elections	President of the National Assembly of Venezuela
Early 2017	Julio Borges	Justice First	2015 parliamentary elections	President of the National Assembly of Venezuela
Mid-2017	Without defined leadership		2017 Venezuelan protests	—
2018	Without defined leadership		2018 presidential elections	
2019	Juan Guaidó	Popular Will	2019 Venezuelan protests	President of the National Assembly of Venezuela
2019	Juan Guaidó	Popular Will	Venezuelan presidential crisis	Acting President of Venezuela
2020	Juan Guaidó	Popular Will	2020 national consultation and COVID-19 pandemic	President of the National Assembly of Venezuela/Acting President of Venezuela
2021-2022	Without defined leadership		2021 Venezuelan regional elections	—
2023	Maria Corina Machado	Come Venezuela	2023 Unitary Platform presidential primaries	Presidential candidate and winner of the 2025 Nobel Peace Prize
2024	Maria Corina Machado	Come Venezuela	2024 presidential election and 2024 presidential election protests	Presidential candidate and winner of the 2025 Nobel Peace Prize
2024	Edmundo González	Independent	2024 presidential election and 2024 presidential election protests	Presidential candidate
2026	Maria Corina Machado	Come Venezuela	2026 Venezuelan political crisis and 2026 Venezuelan protests	Presidential candidate and winner of the 2025 Nobel Peace Prize

=== Election results ===
==== Parliamentary elections ====
Historical composition of the National Assembly:

Chavismo / Others / Opposition
1998	12 / 6 / 34
2000	98 / 67
2005	164 / 3
2010	98 / 2 / 65
2015	55 / 112
2020	256 / 21
2025	256 / 29

==== Presidential elections ====
Percentage of the votes on Chávez/Maduro vs. others.

Chavismo / Others / Opposition
1998	56.20% / 40.61%
2000	59.76% / 37.52%
2006	62.85% / 36.91%
2012	55.07% / 44.32%
2013	50.62% / 49.12%
2018	67.85% / 32.04% (Note: All opposition candidates, election widely viewed as falsified)
2024	51.95% (Note: According to National Electoral Commission of Venezuela) / 43.18% (Note: According to National Electoral Commission of Venezuela)
2024	30.46% (Note: According to Comando Con Venezuela) / 68.74% (Note: According to Comando Con Venezuela)

=== Parties ===
==== Democratic Unity Roundtable ====
Party name	Acronym	Leader	Main ideology	International Associations
Justice First Primero Justicia	PJ	Henrique Capriles Radonski	Conservatism; Economic liberalism Humanism; Social liberalism	None
A New Era Un Nuevo Tiempo	UNT	Manuel Rosales	Democratic socialism Keynesianism; Progressivism; Reformism; Social democracy Third Way	SI
Popular Will Voluntad Popular	VP	Leopoldo López	Decentralization; Economic liberalism Liberalism; Market liberalism Progressivism; Reformism; Social democracy Social liberalism Third Way	SI
Radical Cause La Causa Radical	LCR	Andrés Velásquez	Democratic socialism Ecologism; Labourism; Radicalism; Radical democracy Social democracy	None
Progressive Movement of Venezuela Movimiento Progresista de Venezuela	MPV	Simón Calzadilla	Latin Americanism; Progressivism; Social democracy	None
Project Venezuela Proyecto Venezuela	PRVZL	Henrique Salas Feo	Christian democracy Liberal conservatism Social conservatism	IDU, UPLA
Clear Accounts Cuentas Claras	CC	Vicencio Scarano	Progressivism	None
Progressive Advance Avanzada Progresista	AP	Henri Falcón	Democratic socialism Federalism; Latin Americanism; Non-interventionism; Progressivism; Social democracy	None
Fearless People's Alliance Alianza Bravo Pueblo	ABP	Antonio Ledezma	Anti-Chavism; Social democracy Social justice	None
Emergent People Gente Emergente	GE	Julio César Reyes	Christian democracy Christian humanism	None
National Convergence Convergencia Nacional	CN	Juan José Caldera	Christian democracy Christian humanism Economic liberalism Social conservatism Social market economy	ODCA (observer)
Movement for a Responsible, Sustainable and Entrepreneurial Venezuela Movimiento por una Venezuela Responsable, Sostenible y Emprendedora	MOVERSE	Alexis Romero	Green politics Environmentalism; Progressivism; Social democracy	None
Ecological Movement of Venezuela Movimiento Ecológico de Venezuela	MOVEV	Manuel Díaz	Green politics	Global Greens

=== Student groups ===
- Movimiento Estudiantil

== Symbols ==
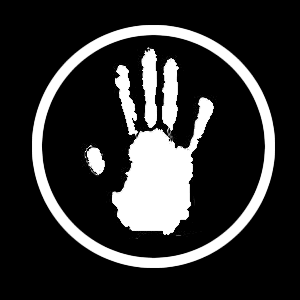
A white hand, symbol of Movimiento Estudiantil during the 2007 protests

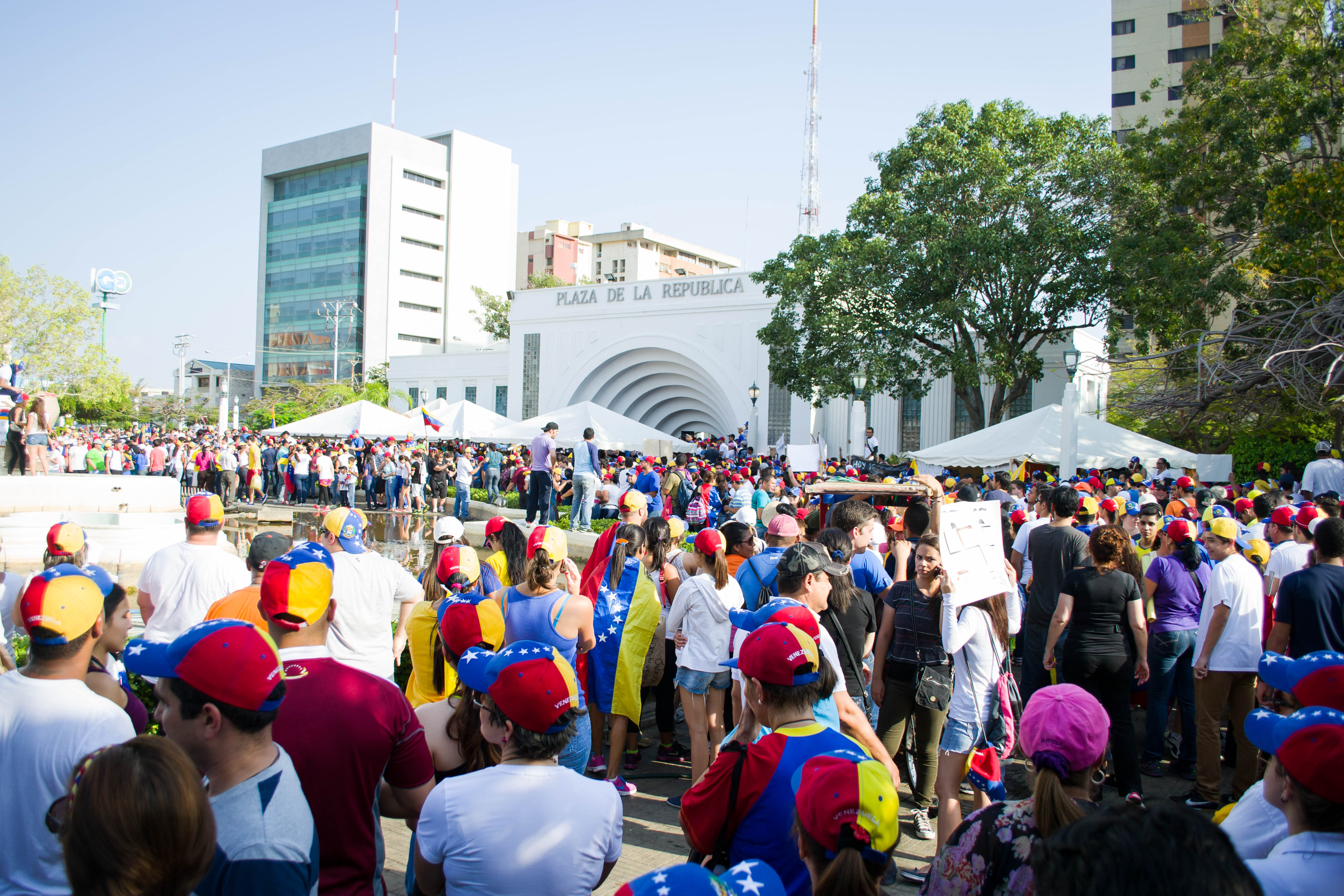
2014 opposition rally in Maracaibo. Several demonstrators wear a tricolor hat, a symbol of the Venezuelan opposition.

When the Chávez government introduced the 2006 flag of Venezuela, the opposition refused to recognize the new symbol, saying that they would continue using the 1954 flag, also known as the seven-star flag. The eight-star design altered Venezuela's 200-year-old flag to feature a left-facing horse rather than right, and to add a star to represent the disputed Guayana territory. The old flag has been used as a sign of opposition and has been used as a dividing symbol by the government and opposition, with some in the opposition viewing the eight-star flag as a representation of oppression. Miss Universe 2009 winner Stefanía Fernández used the seven-star flag while walking down the runway at the Miss Universe 2010 competition. Venezuelan opposition protesters and some individuals belonging to the Venezuelan diaspora continue to use the seven-star flag.

Students that participated in the 2007 protests adopted the white hands as a symbol of nonviolence.

Henrique Capriles popularized the use of the tricolor hat among the Venezuelan opposition during his presidential campaigns.

== See also ==
- Belarusian opposition
- Chinese democracy movement
- Cuban dissident movement
- Generation of 1928
- Hong Kong democracy movement
- Interventions of political parties in Venezuela
- Iranian opposition
- Junta Patriótica
- Kazakh opposition
- Opposition to Vladimir Putin in Russia
- Vietnamese democracy movement
