= The Exit (disambiguation) =

The Exit can refer to:

== Music ==
- The Exit, American music band
- "The Exit" (Conan Gray song), 2022
- "The Exit" (Lydia song), 2013
- The Exit Papers, 2000 EP by the group Low

== Others ==
- "The Exit" (Heaven's Gate), episode of the 2020 documentary series Heaven's Gate: The Cult of Cults
- The Exit List, British game show
- The Exit Players, American improv group
- La Salida opposition political campaign in Venezuela

== See also ==
- Exit (disambiguation)
- No Exit (disambiguation)
- Next Exit (disambiguation)
