= La Salida =

2014 political campaign in Venezuela

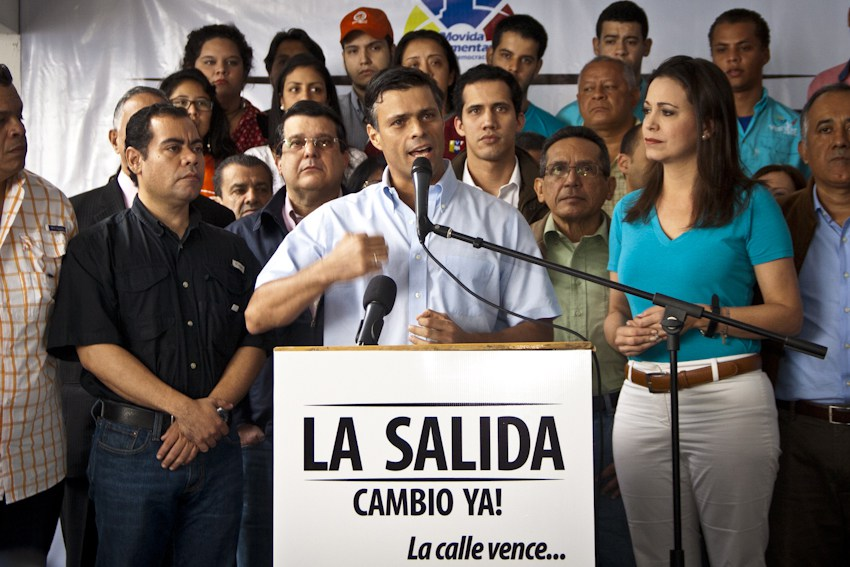
Leopoldo López and María Corina Machado, presenting La Salida. Juan Guaidó is behind.

La Salida (lit. 'The Exit') was a Venezuelan opposition political campaign launched on 23 January 2014. It was based on civil disobedience in an effort to bring an end to the government of President of Venezuela Nicolás Maduro.

The initiative was promoted by Leopoldo López, Antonio Ledezma and María Corina Machado, leaders of the Democratic Unity Roundtable. Maduro's opposition became energized after López turned himself in pursuant to an arrest warrant, shortly after the 2014 wave of protests started.

== Timeline ==
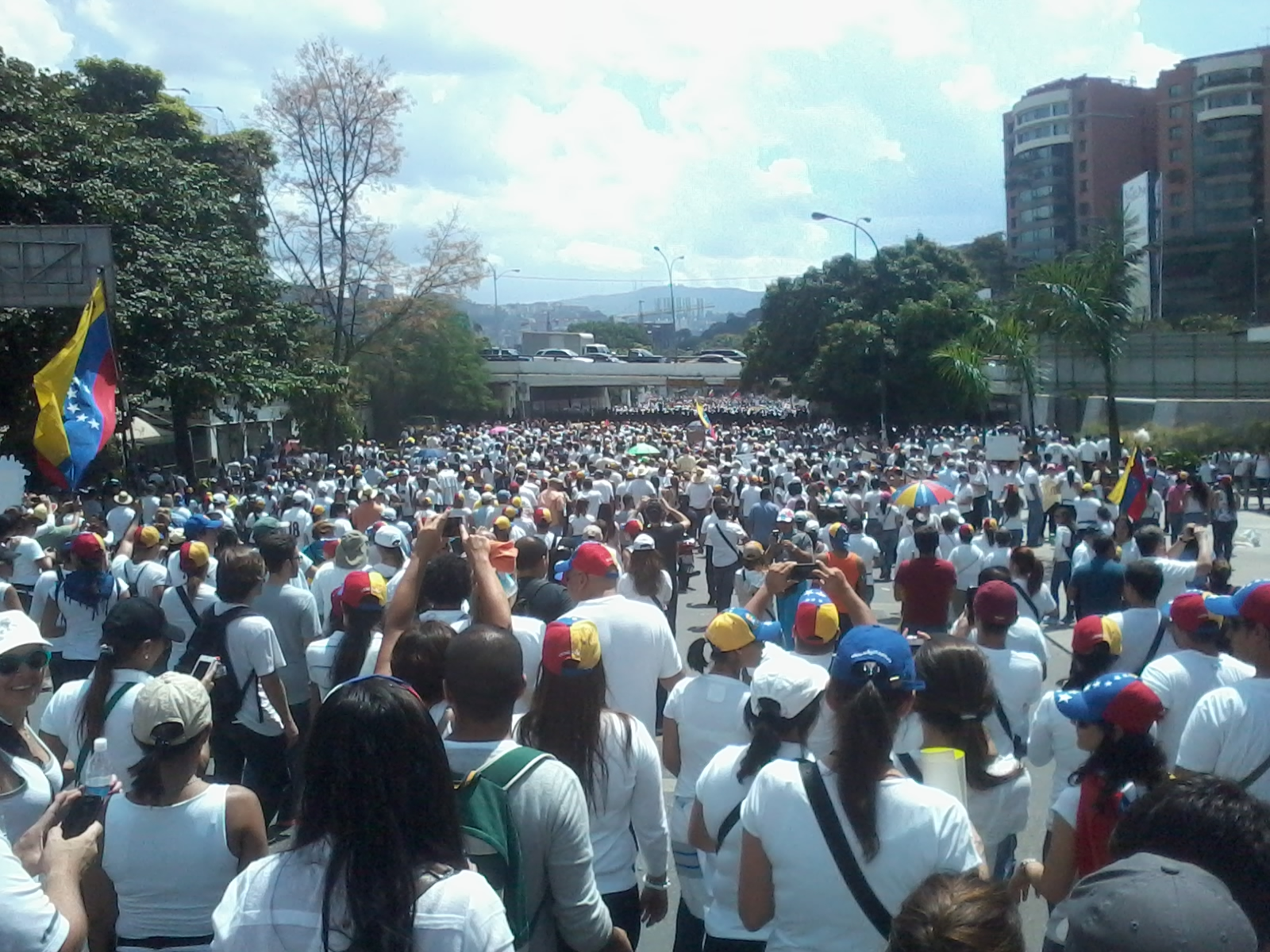
A march in Las Mercedes, Caracas shortly after López was arrested

Rising violence, the murder of Mónica Spear and her husband, and a troubled economic climate of high inflation and food shortages led to protests mostly by students. Demonstrations started on 5 January 2014 in Mérida state, with the death of University of the Andes student Héctor Moreno, and intensified on 4 February in San Cristóbal, Táchira state, after the attempted rape of a student of the university. López presented La Salida alongside the student protests. Henrique Capriles led a moderate approach in opposition to Maduro while López and Machado were described as more radical.

On 12 February, on Venezuela's Youth Day and the bicentennial of the Battle of La Victoria, Movimiento Estudiantil called for a march from Plaza Venezuela in Caracas to the Public Ministry to demand the release of a group of young demonstrators detained days before in San Cristóbal, with the march ending at 2:00pm. Officials of the Bolivarian Intelligence Service shot and killed student Bassil Da Costa. An hour later clashes occurred in the La Candelaria Parish; protesters skirmished with authorities, who responded with tear gas. Colectivo member Juan Montoya and protester Robert Redman were also killed the same day.

That night, an arrest warrant was issued against López, who was charged with Da Costa's murder and the violence during the protests, with the crimes of "conspiracy, incitement to commit a crime, public intimidation, premeditated aggravated homicide and terrorism". He turned himself in on 18 February

In the months after, the majority of protests have been peaceful, consisting of demonstrations, sit-ins, and hunger strikes, although small groups of protesters have been responsible for attacks on public property, such as government buildings and public transportation. Erecting improvised street barricades, dubbed guarimbas, were a controversial form of protest in 2014. The Maduro government grew more repressive towards the opposition responding to the protests.

== See also ==
- Protests against Nicolás Maduro
