= Next Exit (disambiguation) =

Next Exit is an American manga-influenced comic series.

Next Exit may also refer to:

- Next Exit (album), a 1992 album by Grover Washington Jr.
- "Next Exit" (song), a song by Split Enz
- "Next Exit," a song by Interpol from their album Antics
- "Next Exit," a song by Unwound from their album Repetition
- "Next Exit," a song by Vacations from their album No Place Like Home.
- Next Exit, a 2005 film starring Jorja Fox
- Next Exit (film), a 2022 American science fiction comedy-drama film by Mali Elfman

== See also ==
- The Exit (disambiguation)
