= Quit =

Quit or quitter may refer to:

- Resignation or quit, the formal act of giving up one's duties

== Films ==
- The Quitter (1916 film), an American silent western film
- The Quitter (1929 film), an American silent film
- The Quitter (1934 film), an American drama film
- The Quitter (2014 film), an American comedy-drama film
- Quitters, a 2015 American film directed by Noah Pritzker

== Music ==
- Quit (band), an American pop-punk group
- Quits (EP), a 2019 extended play by Flume
- Quit!!, a 2024 album by Hardy
  - "Quit!!" (song), this album's title track
- "Quitter" (song), a 2024 song by Cameron Whitcomb
- "Quit", a song by Cashmere Cat from his 2017 album 9
- "Quitter", a song by Dawes, from the album We're All Gonna Die
- "Quitter", a 2000 Everlast diss track by Eminem, featuring D12
- "Quit", a 1990 song by Susumu Hirasawa from The Ghost in Science
- "Quit", a 2025 song by SB19 from Simula at Wakas
- "Quit", a song by the Waitresses from Wasn't Tomorrow Wonderful?

== Other uses ==
- "Quitters, Inc.", a short story by Stephen King published in 1978

== See also ==
- I Quit (disambiguation)
- "I quit" match, in professional wrestling
- Quitting, a Chinese film
- Quitting smoking
