= XIT =

XIT may refer to:

- XIT (band), a Native American rock group
- XIT, a name briefly used by the 1960s English pop group Consortium
- XIT Ranch, a cattle ranch in Texas, United States

== See also ==
- Exit (disambiguation)
