= No Exit (disambiguation) =

No Exit is a play by Jean-Paul Sartre.

No Exit may also refer to:

== Film and theatre ==
- Adaptations of Sartre's play:
  - No Exit (1954 film) (Huis clos), directed by Jacqueline Audry
  - No Exit (1962 film), directed by Tad Danielewski
  - No Exit (opera), a 2008 chamber opera by Andy Vores
- No Exit (1930 film), a British romantic comedy film directed by Charles Saunders
- No Exit (1995 film), a 1995 Canadian action film directed by Damian Lee
- No Exit (2022 film), a 2022 thriller film directed by Damian Power

== Music ==
- No Exit (The Angels album), 1979
- No Exit (Blondie album), 1999
  - "No Exit" (song), the title song, 1999
- No Exit (Marianne Faithfull album), 2016
- No Exit (Fates Warning album), and its title song, 1988
- "No Exit", a song by Childish Gambino from Because the Internet
- "No Exit", a song by Chris Brown from Heartbreak on a Full Moon

== Television episodes ==
- "No Exit" (The 4400)
- "No Exit" (Battlestar Galactica)
- "No Exit" (Breeders)
- "No Exit" (Law & Order: Criminal Intent)
- "No Exit" (Miami Vice)
- "No Exit" (Midnight Caller)
- "No Exit" (Supernatural)
- "No Exit" (The Vampire Diaries)
- "No Exit" (The West Wing)

== Other ==
- No Exit, a 1990 video game
  - Demolition Racer: No Exit, the Sega Dreamcast enhanced port of the video game Demolition Racer
- "No Exit", an article in The New Republic by Betsy McCaughey

== See also ==
- The Exit (disambiguation)
