= Exit (2011 film) =

- Film poster
- Directed by: Marek Polgar
- Written by: Martyn Pedler
- Produced by: Danielle McCarthy; Kate Pappas; Martyn Pedler; Marek Polgar; Mark Williams
- Starring: Kylie Trounson; Michael Finney; Hannah Moore
- Cinematography: Sasha Whitehouse
- Edited by: Patrick McCabe
- Music by: Shaun Keyt
- Distributed by: Surface Tension Films; Zero Gravity Management
- Release date: August 2011 (Fantasia)
- Running time: 90 minutes
- Countries: Australia; Canada
- Language: English

Exit is a 2011 science fiction thriller film. The film premiered at the 2011 Fantasia International Film Festival.

== Plot ==
In the film, inhabitants of a city begin to believe they are living in a giant maze. They leave their lives behind to walk the streets opening doors, searching for the door they are convinced has been lost for thousands of years: the exit from the city. Whatever is behind it is the subject of contemplation and conflict in the film. The story focuses on one inhabitant, Alice, and her team that believes she has found it using a strange system of maps, symbols and measurements.

== Filming ==
The film was filmed in a bleached out fashion largely around The Hoddle Grid in Melbourne's Central business district.

== Reception ==
Neil Mitchell of the Eye For Film had given the film 4 out of 5 and compared it to Stalker, Primer, and The Matrix.
