= I Quit =

I Quit may refer to:

- a phrase used by people to signify their resignation, or wish to cease what they are doing
- "I quit" match, a professional wrestling match type
- I Quit (album), a 2025 album by Haim
- a song performed by Hepburn
- a song performed by Bros, on the album Push
- a song performed by AJ McLean, on the album Have It All
- a song by The Jealous Girlfriends from the album The Jealous Girlfriends
