= Tricolor hat =

Venezuelan cap

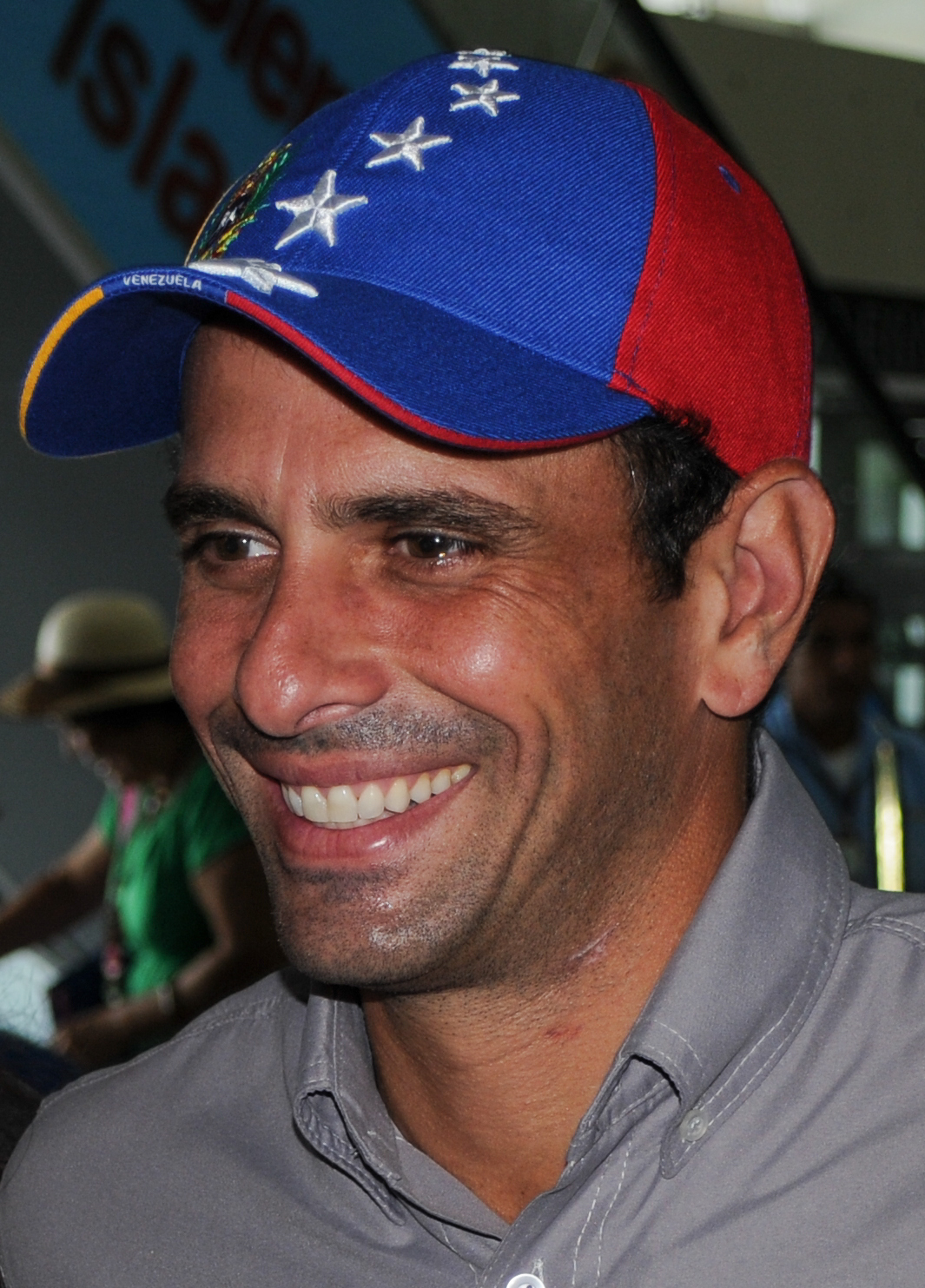
Henrique Capriles, opposition presidential candidate in 2012 and 2013.

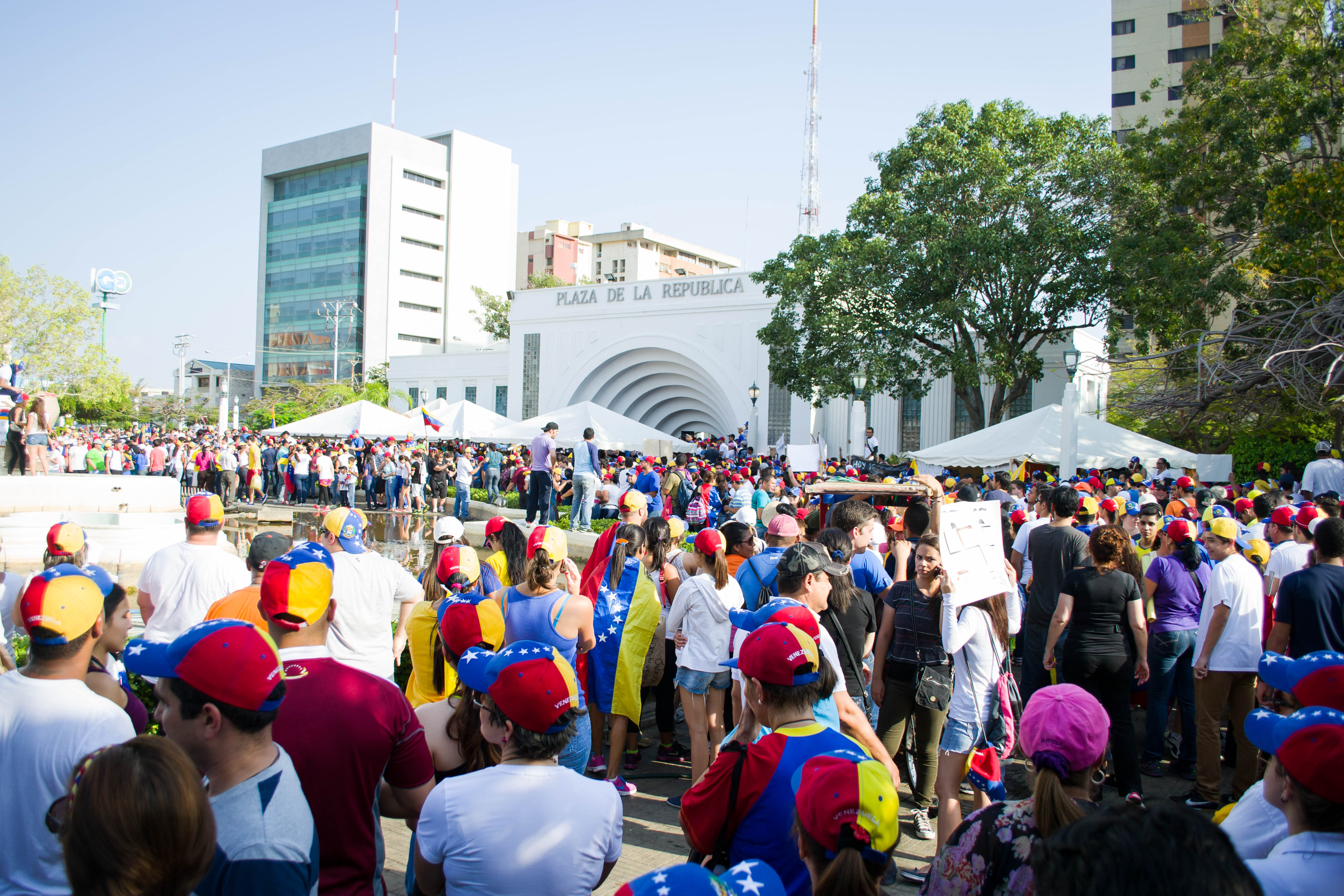
Several demonstrators wearing tricolor hats at an opposition rally in Maracaibo, 2014

The tricolor hat (Spanish: Gorra tricolor) is a cap popularized in Venezuela by opposition presidential candidate Henrique Capriles Radonsky. Its design replicates the yellow, blue and red colors and stars shown on the Venezuelan flag.

== History ==
Although Hugo Chávez often wore the colors of the flag and ignored rules governing campaigning, chavistas attempted to sanction Capriles for violating election rules; popular backlash propelled the cap to a symbol of the opposition. Nicolás Maduro later in 2013 co-opted the cap as a symbol of the Bolivarian Revolution with Maduro claiming the cap's design was the idea of Diosdado Cabello.
