= Henrique Capriles =

Venezuelan politician (born 1972)

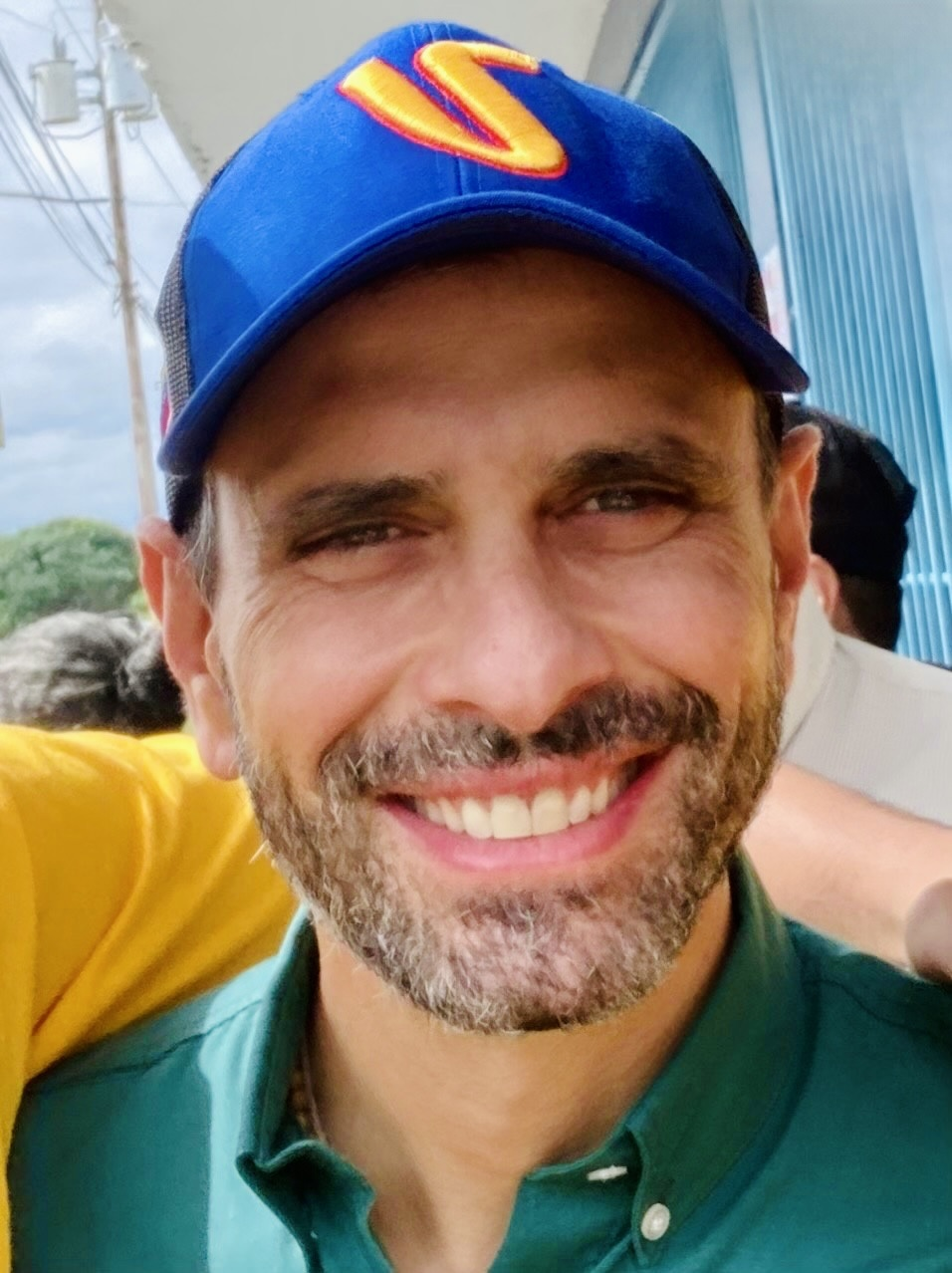
- Capriles in 2022

Member of the National Assembly
- Incumbent
- Assumed office 5 January 2026

Governor of Miranda
- In office 15 January 2013 – 17 October 2017
- Preceded by: Adriana D'Elia
- Succeeded by: Héctor Rodríguez
- In office 29 November 2008 – 6 June 2012
- Preceded by: Diosdado Cabello
- Succeeded by: Adriana D'Elia

4th Mayor of Baruta
- In office 30 July 2000 – 26 November 2008
- Preceded by: Ivonne Attas
- Succeeded by: Gerardo Blyde

Vice President of Congress
- In office 23 January 1999 – 22 December 1999
- Preceded by: Ixora Rojas
- Succeeded by: Position abolished

President of the Chamber of Deputies
- In office 23 January 1999 – 22 December 1999
- Preceded by: Ixora Rojas
- Succeeded by: Position abolished

Member of the Chamber of Deputies for Zulia State
- In office 23 January 1999 – 22 December 1999

Personal details
- Born: Henrique Capriles Radonski; 11 July 1972 (age 54) Caracas, Venezuela
- Party: Copei (Before 2000); Justice First (2000–2025); Union and Change (2025–)
- Other political affiliations: Democratic Unity Roundtable (2008–2021)
- Domestic partner: Valeria Valle (2019)
- Children: 3
- Education: Andrés Bello Catholic University; Central University of Venezuela

Henrique Capriles Radonski (Spanish pronunciation: [enˈrike kaˈpɾiles raˈðonski]; born 11 July 1972) is a Venezuelan politician and lawyer, who served as the 36th Governor of Miranda from 2008 to 2017.

Born in Caracas, he received a degree in law from the Universidad Católica Andrés Bello, and later in tax law from the Central University of Venezuela. He first ventured into politics at age 26, when he became the youngest member ever elected to the Venezuelan parliament. He secured a seat in the Chamber of Deputies in the 1998 parliamentary elections, under the Christian Democratic Party (Copei). He served as vice president of the Congress and president of the Chamber of Deputies until their dissolution by the Constituent Assembly in August 1999.

In 2000, he co-founded the political party Primero Justicia, alongside politicians Julio Borges and Leopoldo Lopez, and ran successfully for the mayorship of the Baruta municipality in the regional elections held in July 2000, and later for the governorship of the Miranda state in 2008. Capriles became the opposition candidate at the 2012 and 2013 presidential elections, and faced then-President Hugo Chávez and Vice President Nicolás Maduro respectively.

His defeat in 2012 marked the first loss of his political career. Maduro narrowly defeated Capriles in the 2013 elections, a result that sparked controversy and debate amid the opposition's claims of electoral fraud. Between both presidential campaigns, Capriles successfully secured his re-election as Governor of Miranda during the 2012 regional elections. He has repeatedly been the target of smear campaigns by political opponents who seek to capitalize on homophobic and antisemitic currents in Venezuelan society.

Capriles Radonski is of Sephardi Jewish and Ashkenazi Jewish descent – his grandparents emigrated from German and Russian occupied Poland during World War II; however, he self-describes as Catholic, revealing that his greatest hero in history was Jesus Christ. He dated Venezuelan actress Erika de la Vega between his first and second tenure as Mayor. Prior to his political career, he worked in the public and private sectors at several tax and law firms of Venezuela. Capriles is a member of the International Fiscal Association.

On 5 April 2017, Capriles was formally banned for 15 years from political activity accused by the Venezuelan government of alleged "administrative irregularities" which had occurred under his governorship. He ceased to be the Governor of Miranda in October after the 2017 regional elections, and subsequently declared his intent to leave the Democratic Unity Roundtable in protest against what he considered its legitimizing the Maduro government.

== Early life ==
Henrique Capriles Radonski was born in Caracas on 11 July 1972. His parents are Henrique Capriles García, a successful businessman, descendant of Juan Agustín Bolívar, who was half-brother of Simón Bolívar and Mónica Cristina Radonski-Bochenek. His maternal grandparents were Ashkenazi Jews who emigrated from German and Russian occupied Poland following World War II. His great-grand parents were murdered at the Treblinka extermination camp during the Holocaust. His maternal grandmother, Lili Bochenek, lived for 20 months in the Warsaw Ghetto. His paternal grandfather, Armando Capriles-Myerston, was a Sephardi Jew.

In the 1950s, Henrique Capriles García helped launch Kraft Foods' entry into Venezuela by inviting the vice-president of its Nabisco subsidiary and persuading him to invest in the country. His maternal grandparents, Andrés Radonski and Lili Bochenek, emigrated to Venezuela in 1947 from Poland. Andrés Radonski was an engineer active in the cinema business in Poland; he opened his first cinema several years later, in the eastern city of Puerto La Cruz.

The company operated under the name Circuito Radonski. It was merged in 1998 alongside Venefilms and Grupo Blanco to create the country's largest cinema chain, Cinex. He is also the descendant of relatives who operated the media conglomerate, Cadena Capriles.

== Education ==
Capriles enrolled at the Andrés Bello Catholic University to study commerce law. He received his degree in 1994, and then continued studies at the Central University of Venezuela. He received a degree in tax law several years later. He took additional studies at the IBFD International Tax Academy in Amsterdam, the Pan American Center of Tax Managers in Viterbo, and Columbia University. He is a sitting member of the International Fiscal Association and the World Association of Young Jurors.

== Political career ==
=== Early years and Chamber of Deputies (1995–1999) ===
Capriles first ventured into politics between 1995 and 1998, when he aided his cousin, deputy Armando Capriles, in the writing of laws for the Bicameral Commission of Energy of the then-existing Congress of the Republic. Armando, who was a partisan of the Christian democratic party Copei, later offered Henrique the possibility of being a candidate for a seat at the Chamber of Deputies at the 1998 parliamentary elections, affiliating with Copei (Social Christian Party). Capriles accepted, and successfully secured a seat at the Congress in representation of the Zulia state. He became the youngest member ever elected to the Venezuelan parliament, and later held the positions of Vice President of the Congress and President of the Chamber of Deputies.

In August 1999, the Constituent Assembly abolished Capriles' seat, and dissolved the Congress. Capriles criticized Chávez's new constitution, stating at the time, "This is a corrupt constitution that will leave Venezuela backward and poor", while further denouncing the centralized power that it granted the president.

=== Mayor of Baruta (2000–2008) ===
The Congress was replaced by the National Assembly, and new deputies were elected in a general election held, in 2000. That year, Capriles founded the political party Primero Justicia, alongside politicians Julio Borges and Leopoldo Lopez, although the entity had already existed as a civil association since 1992. He did not run for a seat at the newly created Assembly; however, he and Leopoldo Lopez pursued the mayoralties of the Baruta and Chacao municipalities, respectively, at the regional elections held in July 2000. Lopez won with 51,5% of the vote, whereas Capriles received 62,9%. Borges secured a seat in the National Assembly. As mayor, Capriles focused on the reduction of crime within his municipality, as well as on improving the overall infrastructure of the area.

In 2002, President Hugo Chávez was the target of a failed coup d'état that removed him from office on 11 April 2002, after several days of violent protests in Caracas. The coup, triggered by major political discontent in a sector of the Venezuelan population, was initially staged by members of the military and the Venezuelan Federation of Chambers of Commerce (Fedecámaras), represented by its president Pedro Carmona, who was declared the interim president. The following day, the Cuban embassy, located in Baruta, received severe damage, caused by opposition protesters who cut off the water and electricity supply, smashed windows, damaged six staff vehicles, and blocked the Cuban ambassador, German Sanchez Otero, from leaving. The same day, Interior Minister Ramon Rodriguez Chacin was detained by the municipal police.

Chávez returned to the presidency on 13 April 2002. Capriles then faced charges as a result of the attacks on the embassy. In March 2004, Danilo Anderson publicly declared that Capriles would be arrested; the warrant was annulled in early April. In May 2004, Capriles was arrested on the orders of Anderson, on the grounds that Capriles might flee the country; he was released on probation in September, pending his trial. In December 2006, Capriles was acquitted of the charge of fomenting violence in the siege of the Cuban embassy during the coup attempt, but five months later, his acquittal was annulled by the court of appeal, and the case was re-opened in October 2008. The U.S. Department of State mentioned Capriles' case in its 2008 Human Rights report as a denial of a fair public trial.

=== Governor of Miranda (2008–2017) ===
In the 2008 Venezuelan regional elections, Capriles was elected Governor of Miranda state, defeating Diosdado Cabello. During his tenure, Capriles invested in education, opening 39 schools by 2011, compared to 7 under the previous governor. Capriles passed on the governorship of the state of Miranda to the Secretary General of Miranda, Adriana D'Elia, on 6 June 2012, in compliance with Venezuelan law which states an incumbent governor cannot run for the presidency of the nation. He was elected again on 16 December 2012, beating former Vice President Elías Jaua.

On 5 April 2017, the Comptroller General of Venezuela notified Capriles that for 15 years, he would be prevented from participating in public office, due to his misuse of public funds, a charge that Capriles denied.

Capriles stated that he would not step down and that "I am and will continue being your governor until the people elects another governor". On 8 April 2017, the campaign headquarters for Capriles was attacked with tear gas and fires ignited inside of the building, destroying it.

On 11 April, Capriles used his decree powers to order a referendum to determine whether or not he should remain governor of Miranda state, challenging President Maduro to do the same with Venezuelans nationwide and promising he would resign if individuals voted for him to be removed from office. The order by the Comptroller General of Venezuela, if valid, would also prevent Capriles from running in the 2018 presidential election.

=== 2012 presidential election ===
Capriles was selected in primaries held in February 2012 as the opposition candidate against Hugo Chávez in the presidential elections to be held in October 2012; he won the opposition primaries with 1,900,528 (64.2%) votes of the 3,059,024 votes cast (votes from abroad not included).

Capriles named former Brazilian president Luiz Inácio Lula da Silva as his political inspiration. Similar to Lula, he embraced third way politics.

In February 2012, Capriles was subjected to attacks by state-run media sources.

The Wall Street Journal reported that Capriles "was exposed in [sic] a campaign in Venezuela's state-run media, which insinuated he was, among other things, a homosexual and a Zionist". An opinion article of 13 February 2012 on the website of the state-owned Radio Nacional de Venezuela, titled "The Enemy is Zionism", mentioned Capriles's Jewish ancestry and a meeting he had held with local Jewish leaders, saying, "This is our enemy, the Zionism that Capriles today represents ... Zionism, along with capitalism, are responsible for 90% of world poverty and imperialist wars." Chávez repeatedly denied allegations of tolerating or promoting anti-Semitism.

In early September 2012, David De Lima, a former governor of Anzoategui, published a document he said showed secret MUD plans to implement much more neoliberal policy, if elected, than their public statements showed. De Lima claimed the document was a form of policy pact between some of the candidates in the MUD primary, including Capriles.

On 6 September 2012, opposition legislator William Ojeda denounced these plans and the "neoliberal obsessions" of his colleagues in the MUD; he was suspended by his A New Era party the following day. Capriles said his purported signature on the document was a forgery, while the MUD's economic advisor said that the MUD had "no hidden agenda", and that its plans included the "institutionalisation" of the government's Bolivarian Missions so that they would no longer be "subject to the whims of government". One small coalition party claimed De Lima had offered them money to withdraw from the MUD; De Lima denied the claim.

On 7 October 2012, Capriles lost the election to then-President Hugo Chávez.

=== 2013 presidential election ===
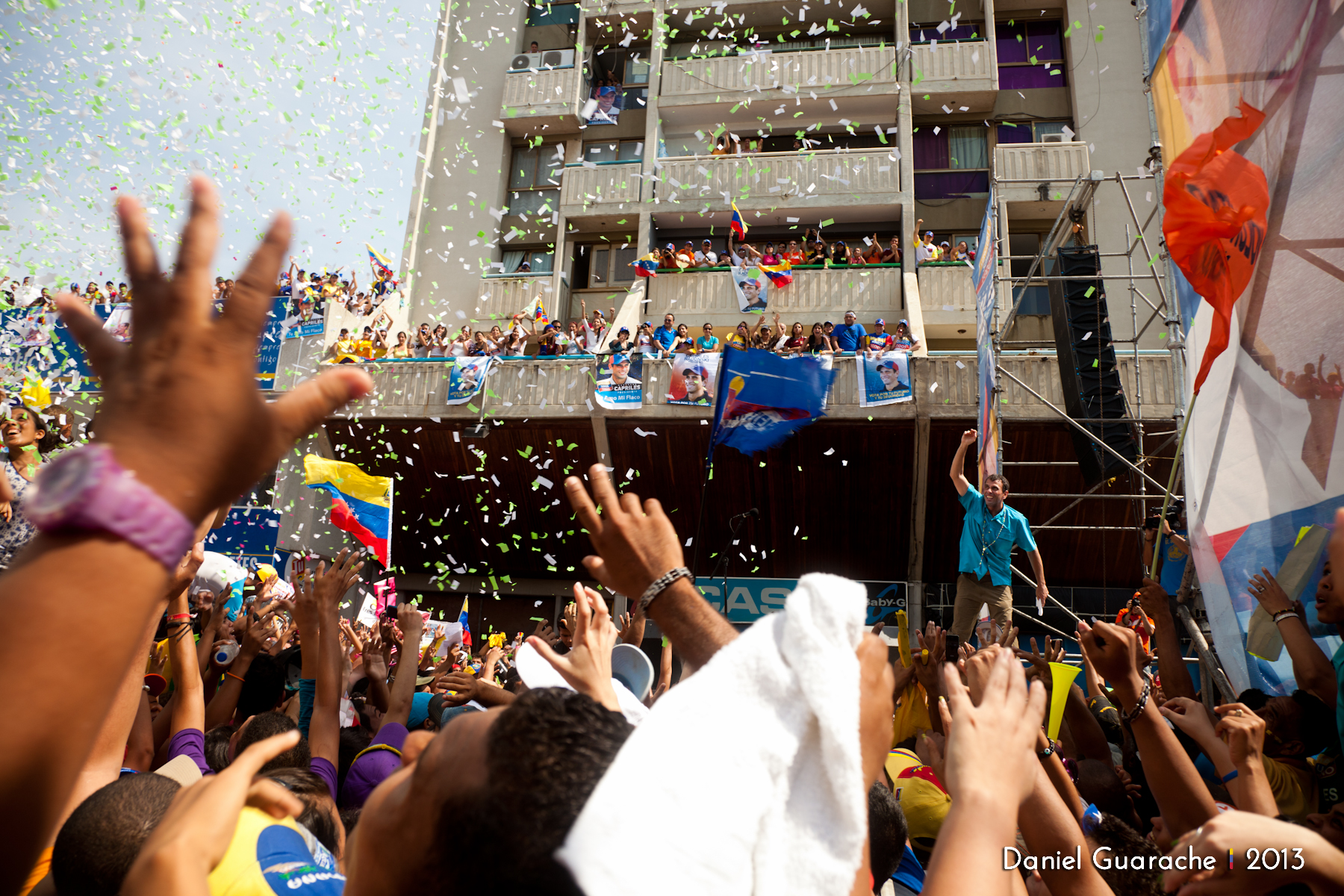
Henrique Capriles in Cumaná, Venezuela, prior to the 2013 presidential elections.

Capriles faced interim president Nicolás Maduro in a presidential election on 14 April 2013. Voters gave Maduro—who had assumed the role of acting president since Chávez's death—a narrow victory over Capriles. Capriles rejected the results of the election, claiming election irregularities and calling for a full audit of the election results. Maduro said he would accept an audit of the election results; the election board did not agree to opposition demands for a total recount.

The Supreme Court of Justice denied Capriles' appeal on 7 August 2013.

=== 2025 National Assembly election ===
On April 2, 2025, the political disqualification was lifted, which had prevented Capriles from running for public office. Breaking with the abstentionist line followed by other parties, including Primero Justicia, Capriles registered as a candidate of the National Assembly. Capriles was elected as a deputy on the UNT–UNICA list.

== Political analysis ==
According to the Associated Press in 2017:

Capriles is a scion of one of Venezuela's wealthiest families, but his sometimes vulgar talk and mannerisms echo the late Chavez's populist style and he has tried to reach out to Chavez supporters. He prides himself on staying close to home when others in the opposition have been quick to fly off to Washington and other capitals to seek help.

== Personal life ==
Capriles was raised a Catholic. His parents agreed to educate their children in the Catholic faith "until they were old enough to decide for themselves" as a "compromise". Capriles has continued as a "fervent Catholic" through his adulthood, commenting that his greatest hero in history was Jesus Christ. He is a cousin of Miguel Ángel Capriles López, son of the founder of Cadena Capriles.

In November 2019, he announced that he was expecting his first child with psychologist Valeria Valle. Sofía Del Valle Capriles Valle was born on April 6, 2020. In March 2021, they announced they were expecting their second child. Lili Margarita Capriles Valle was born on August 5. In March 2023, they announced they were expecting their third child. Henrique José Capriles Valle was born on September 10.

== See also ==
- Political prisoners in Venezuela
- Tricolor hat

== Notes ==
Political offices
Preceded by Ivonne Attas	Mayor of Baruta; 2000–2008	Succeeded by Gerardo Blyde
Preceded by Diosdado Cabello	Governor of Miranda; 2008–2017	Succeeded by Héctor Rodríguez
