= 2012 Venezuelan regional elections =

- 16 December 2012

23 governorships 233 state legislators
- Registered: 17,421,946
- Turnout: 53.94% (▼0.13pp)
Alliance	GPPSB	MUD
Popular vote	4,853,494	3,883,037
Percentage	55.22%	44.78%
Swing	▲3.12pp	▲2.96pp
Governors	20	3
Governors +/–	▲3	▼2
- States won by party

Regional elections were held in Venezuela on 16 December 2012 to elect state governors and state legislators. The result was a victory for the ruling United Socialist Party, which won the governorships of 20 of the 23 states, an increase from the 18 won in the 2008 elections. Voter turnout was 53%.

== Gubernatorial elections ==
=== Amazonas ===
Candidate	Party	Votes	%
Liborio Guarulla	Progresist Movement of Venezuela	35,328	55.03
Nicia Maldonado	United Socialist Party of Venezuela	24,876	38.75
Gregorio Mirabal	United Multiethnic Peoples of the Amazonas	3,523	5.49
Magno Barros	Democratic Action	242	0.38
Plinio Graterol	Authentic Renewal Organization	153	0.24
Antonio Corapse	New Vision for My Country	77	0.12
Total		64,199	100.00
Valid votes		64,199	96.76
Invalid/blank votes		2,149	3.24
Total votes		66,348	100.00
Registered voters/turnout		97,560	68.01
Source: CNE

=== Anzoátegui ===
Candidate	Party	Votes	%
Aristóbulo Istúriz	United Socialist Party of Venezuela	292,753	56.46
Antonio Barreto Sira	Democratic Action	222,280	42.87
Manuel Lozada	New Pact	1,975	0.38
Juan Carlo Mata	New Vision for My Country	535	0.10
Ubaldo Alvarado	People's Electoral Movement	500	0.10
Elieser Teran	Socialism and Liberty Party	284	0.05
Edwin Figuera	Labour Power	197	0.04
Total		518,524	100.00
Valid votes		518,524	96.26
Invalid/blank votes		20,163	3.74
Total votes		538,687	100.00
Registered voters/turnout		1,013,188	53.17
Source: CNE

=== Apure ===
Candidate	Party	Votes	%
Ramón Carrizales	United Socialist Party of Venezuela	94,112	63.31
Luis Lippa	Citizen Force	32,991	22.19
Leopoldo Estrada	People's Electoral Movement	21,220	14.27
José Sosa	New Vision for My Country	332	0.22
Total		148,655	100.00
Valid votes		148,655	96.15
Invalid/blank votes		5,958	3.85
Total votes		154,613	100.00
Registered voters/turnout		313,874	49.26
Source: CNE

=== Aragua ===
Candidate	Party	Votes	%
Tareck El Aissami	United Socialist Party of Venezuela	341,316	55.57
Richard Mardo	Justice First	271,367	44.18
Aris Segovia	New Vision for My Country	945	0.15
Ruth Rodríguez	Authentic Renewal Organization	502	0.08
Emilio Bastidas	Socialism and Liberty Party	113	0.02
Total		614,243	100.00
Valid votes		614,243	95.70
Invalid/blank votes		27,628	4.30
Total votes		641,871	100.00
Registered voters/turnout		1,173,046	54.72
Source: CNE

=== Barinas ===
Candidate	Party	Votes	%
Adán Chávez	United Socialist Party of Venezuela	143,198	57.90
Julio César Reyes	Progressive Advance	104,046	42.07
Marco Tezara	New Vision for My Country	76	0.03
Total		247,320	100.00
Valid votes		247,320	96.41
Invalid/blank votes		9,207	3.59
Total votes		256,527	100.00
Registered voters/turnout		531,227	48.29
Source: CNE

=== Bolívar ===
Candidate	Party	Votes	%
Francisco Rangel Gómez	United Socialist Party of Venezuela	173,536	46.55
Andrés Velásquez	Radical Cause	163,265	43.80
Manuel Arciniega	Communist Party of Venezuela	30,045	8.06
Robert Martínez	New Vision for My Country	2,045	0.55
Amauris Aular	Emerging People	1,332	0.36
Pedro Rondón	Think Democracy	890	0.24
María Quintina	Venezuelan Revolutionary Currents	626	0.17
José Contreras	Authentic Renewal Organization	406	0.11
Edwin Zambrano	Revolutionary Party of Work	387	0.10
Pedro Tabarés	Free Voters	223	0.06
Total		372,755	100.00
Valid votes		372,755	95.34
Invalid/blank votes		18,225	4.66
Total votes		390,980	100.00
Registered voters/turnout		950,034	41.15
Source: CNE

=== Carabobo ===
Candidate	Party	Votes	%
Francisco Ameliach	United Socialist Party of Venezuela	408,439	55.74
Henrique Salas Feo	Project Venezuela	319,619	43.62
Noe Mujica	NOE Unity	1,556	0.21
Laura Valls	Free Voters	1,052	0.14
Raúl Coraspe	New Vision for My Country	731	0.10
Juan Linares	Organised Youth of Venezuela	581	0.08
María Mirabal	Labour Power	327	0.04
Antonio Espinoza	Socialism and Liberty Party	276	0.04
Juan Peña Loyo	Republican Bicentennial Vanguard	212	0.03
Total		732,793	100.00
Valid votes		732,793	96.84
Invalid/blank votes		23,934	3.16
Total votes		756,727	100.00
Registered voters/turnout		1,533,809	49.34
Source: CNE

=== Cojedes ===
Candidate	Party	Votes	%
Erika Farías	United Socialist Party of Venezuela	75,383	63.43
Alberto Galíndez	Democratic Action	42,820	36.03
José Rodríguez	New Vision for My Country	216	0.18
José Castro	Ecological Movement of Venezuela	154	0.13
Pedro León	Cojedian Socialist Party	136	0.11
Antonio Matute	New Social Order	77	0.06
Wilfredo Lago	Labour Power	55	0.05
Total		118,841	100.00
Valid votes		118,841	95.18
Invalid/blank votes		6,012	4.82
Total votes		124,853	100.00
Registered voters/turnout		225,036	55.48
Source: CNE

=== Delta Amacuro ===
Candidate	Party	Votes	%
Lizeta Hernández	United Socialist Party of Venezuela	42,037	82.09
Arévalo Salazar	Movement for Socialism	8,213	16.04
Migdaesi Pinto	New Vision for My Country	933	1.82
Ricardo Koesling	New Social Order	28	0.05
Total		51,211	100.00
Valid votes		51,211	95.98
Invalid/blank votes		2,143	4.02
Total votes		53,354	100.00
Registered voters/turnout		114,043	46.78
Source: CNE

=== Falcón ===
Candidate	Party	Votes	%
Stella Lugo	United Socialist Party of Venezuela	157,640	51.59
Gregorio Graterol	Independent (MUD)	109,779	35.93
Oswaldo León	Independent	36,287	11.88
Raumel Guerrero	Community Defence Movement	1,104	0.36
Magalis Covis	Republican Bicentennial Vanguard	583	0.19
Elsa Colina	New Vision for My Country	173	0.06
Total		305,566	100.00
Valid votes		305,566	96.05
Invalid/blank votes		12,563	3.95
Total votes		318,129	100.00
Registered voters/turnout		638,516	49.82
Source: CNE

=== Guárico ===
Candidate	Party	Votes	%
Ramón Rodríguez Chacín	United Socialist Party of Venezuela	148,445	74.71
José Manuel González	Democratic Action	50,163	25.25
Juan Carlos Rodríguez	New Vision for My Country	87	0.04
Total		198,695	100.00
Valid votes		198,695	96.06
Invalid/blank votes		8,139	3.94
Total votes		206,834	100.00
Registered voters/turnout		503,312	41.09
Source: CNE

=== Lara ===
Candidate	Party	Votes	%
Henri Falcón	Progressive Advance	352,478	53.88
Luis Reyes Reyes	United Socialist Party of Venezuela	300,074	45.87
Julio La Cruz	Think Democracy	971	0.15
Cesar Guerrero	Ecological Movement of Venezuela	691	0.11
Total		654,214	100.00
Valid votes		654,214	96.65
Invalid/blank votes		22,670	3.35
Total votes		676,884	100.00
Registered voters/turnout		1,203,490	56.24
Source: CNE

=== Mérida ===
Candidate	Party	Votes	%
Alexis Ramírez	United Socialist Party of Venezuela	150,493	50.24
Léster Rodríguez	Copei	116,197	38.79
Florencio Porras	Communist Party of Venezuela	31,765	10.60
Daniel García	Independent Merideños Progressives	467	0.16
Gerardo Pacheco	Ecological Movement of Venezuela	293	0.10
Simón Rodríguez	Socialism and Liberty Party	248	0.08
Rafael Farias	New Vision for My Country	86	0.03
Total		299,549	100.00
Valid votes		299,549	96.56
Invalid/blank votes		10,664	3.44
Total votes		310,213	100.00
Registered voters/turnout		584,457	53.08
Source: CNE

=== Miranda ===
Candidate	Party	Votes	%
Henrique Capriles	Justice First	583,660	51.83
Elías Jaua	United Socialist Party of Venezuela	538,549	47.83
Claudio Ojeda	New Vision for My Country	3,561	0.32
Jorge Contreras	National Opinion	297	0.03
Total		1,126,067	100.00
Valid votes		1,126,067	96.83
Invalid/blank votes		36,888	3.17
Total votes		1,162,955	100.00
Registered voters/turnout		1,993,236	58.35
Source: CNE

=== Monagas ===
Candidate	Party	Votes	%
Yelitze Santaella	United Socialist Party of Venezuela	168,532	55.11
José Gregorio Briceño	Independent	129,225	42.26
Soraya Hernández	Independent (MUD)	7,416	2.43
Judith Márquez	New Vision for My Country	432	0.14
Humberto Canales	National Opinion	95	0.03
Francisco Arias	Republican Bicentennial Vanguard	88	0.03
Total		305,788	100.00
Valid votes		305,788	96.46
Invalid/blank votes		11,212	3.54
Total votes		317,000	100.00
Registered voters/turnout		599,082	52.91
Source: CNE

=== Nueva Esparta ===
Candidate	Party	Votes	%
Carlos Mata Figueroa	United Socialist Party of Venezuela	110,982	54.06
Morel Rodríguez Ávila	Democratic Action	93,868	45.72
Luis López Marcano	Ecological Movement of Venezuela	302	0.15
Frank Pinto	New Vision for My Country	139	0.07
Total		205,291	100.00
Valid votes		205,291	97.01
Invalid/blank votes		6,333	2.99
Total votes		211,624	100.00
Registered voters/turnout		334,218	63.32
Source: CNE

=== Portuguesa ===
Candidate	Party	Votes	%
Wilmar Castro Soteldo	United Socialist Party of Venezuela	131,367	53.76
Oswaldo Zerpa	Communist Party of Venezuela	60,809	24.89
Iván Colmenares	Independent (MUD)	51,081	20.90
Rafael Blanco	New Vision for My Country	602	0.25
Jesús Gonzáles	Revolutionary Party of Work	267	0.11
Akram El Nimer	Ecological Movement of Venezuela	227	0.09
Total		244,353	100.00
Valid votes		244,353	95.19
Invalid/blank votes		12,339	4.81
Total votes		256,692	100.00
Registered voters/turnout		583,710	43.98
Source: CNE

=== Sucre ===
Candidate	Party	Votes	%
Luis Acuña	United Socialist Party of Venezuela	157,344	59.81
Hernán Núñez	Popular Will	93,869	35.68
Félix Rodríguez	Labour Power	8,892	3.38
Elías Ocque	Good Land	2,860	1.09
Eleazar Guillen	Socialism and Liberty Party	117	0.04
Total		263,082	100.00
Valid votes		263,082	95.73
Invalid/blank votes		11,731	4.27
Total votes		274,813	100.00
Registered voters/turnout		630,820	43.56
Source: CNE

=== Táchira ===
Candidate	Party	Votes	%
José G. Vielma Mora	United Socialist Party of Venezuela	248,788	54.00
César Pérez Vivas	Copei	209,568	45.49
William Méndez	National Opinion	1,700	0.37
Manuel Rugeles	Orientation Party of Táchira State	321	0.07
Rafael Escobar	New Vision for My Country	302	0.07
Total		460,679	100.00
Valid votes		460,679	96.77
Invalid/blank votes		15,380	3.23
Total votes		476,059	100.00
Registered voters/turnout		826,821	57.58
Source: CNE

=== Trujillo ===
Candidate	Party	Votes	%
Henry Rangel Silva	United Socialist Party of Venezuela	183,453	82.30
José Hernández	Democratic Action	38,511	17.28
Oscar Hernández	New Vision for My Country	941	0.42
Total		222,905	100.00
Valid votes		222,905	97.20
Invalid/blank votes		6,414	2.80
Total votes		229,319	100.00
Registered voters/turnout		506,233	45.30
Source: CNE

=== Vargas ===
Candidate	Party	Votes	%
Jorge García Carneiro	United Socialist Party of Venezuela	77,476	73.45
José Manuel Olivares	A New Era	26,518	25.14
Cristian González	United Vargas	1,275	1.21
Pedro Grateron	New Vision for My Country	145	0.14
César Gutierrez	Labour Power	71	0.07
Total		105,485	100.00
Valid votes		105,485	94.51
Invalid/blank votes		6,126	5.49
Total votes		111,611	100.00
Registered voters/turnout		268,605	41.55
Source: CNE

=== Yaracuy ===
Candidate	Party	Votes	%
Julio León Heredia	United Socialist Party of Venezuela	127,333	61.48
Biaggio Pilieri	Convergence	78,217	37.77
Richard José Lira	Authentic Renewal Organization	654	0.32
José Luis Portillo	New Vision for My Country	601	0.29
Ender Guedez	Socialist Renewal Movement	307	0.15
Total		207,112	100.00
Valid votes		207,112	95.12
Invalid/blank votes		10,633	4.88
Total votes		217,745	100.00
Registered voters/turnout		408,208	53.34
Source: CNE

=== Zulia ===
Candidate	Party	Votes	%
Francisco Arias Cárdenas	United Socialist Party of Venezuela	759,214	52.23
Pablo Pérez Álvarez	A New Era	693,225	47.69
Iris Rincón	New Vision for My Country	657	0.05
María Bolívar	United Democratic Party for Peace	620	0.04
Total		1,453,716	100.00
Valid votes		1,453,716	97.83
Invalid/blank votes		32,296	2.17
Total votes		1,486,012	100.00
Registered voters/turnout		2,389,371	62.19
Source: CNE
