= List of governors of Trujillo =

- State coat of arms

- Flag of the State
- Incumbent; Gerardo Márquez
- Style: Governor
- Status: Head of State
- Term length: Four years

This is a list of governors of the Venezuelan Trujillo State:

Until 1989, they were appointed by the president of Venezuela. Starting from that year they are elected in universal, direct and secret elections.

== Elected governors ==
Took office	Left office	Governor	Vote
1989	1992	José Méndez Quijada, Democratic Action	48.00
1992	1995	José Méndez Quijada, Democratic Action	48.46
1995	1998	Luis González, Democratic Action	39.07
1998	2000	Luis González, Democratic Action	46.31
2000	2004	Gilmer Viloria, Fifth Republic Movement	56.91
2004	2008	Gilmer Viloria, Fifth Republic Movement	54.31
2008	2012	Hugo Cabezas, United Socialist Party of Venezuela	59.47
2012	2017	Henry Rangel Silva, United Socialist Party of Venezuela	82.30
2017	2021	Henry Rangel Silva, PSUV	59,75
2021	2025	Gerardo Marquez, PSUV	41,67
2025	2029	Gerardo Marquez, GPPSB	91,86

== See also ==
- List of Venezuela governors
- Politics of Venezuela
- History of Venezuela
