= Venezuelan Revolutionary Currents =

Venezuelan Revolutionary Currents Corrientes Revolucionarias Venezolanas
- General Secretary: Ramses Augustus Reyes Colmenares
- Registered: 2000
- Headquarters: Caracas
- Ideology: Socialism; Chavismo; Bolivarianism; Anti-imperialism
- Political position: Far-left
- National affiliation: Great Patriotic Pole

Venezuelan Revolutionary Currents (Spanish: Corrientes Revolucionarias Venezolanas, CRV) is a Venezuelan far-left political party that was officially founded in 2000, the party's secretary general is Ramses Reyes. CRV is currently a part of the GPPSB, an alliance of various left-wing political parties and social movements that support the Bolivarian Revolution promoted by former president of Venezuela Hugo Chávez Frías. It is currently not authorized to participate in elections due to its legal problems.

== Ideology ==
The CRV defines itself as a socialist political movement with ideology based on the thesis of popular power, direct democracy, left-wing nationalism, anti-feudalism, anti-imperialism and Chavismo. CRV stated goals are to expand the Bolivarian Revolution, break the political, cultural and economic dependence of the Venezuela and to implement Direct Democracy.

== History ==
The beginnings of CRV as an organization date back to the years 1985–1991 in a form of various organized student protests, especially in different high schools in La Pastora Parish, Caracas. It maintained a critical role of organizing protests during and after the events of Caracazo, a civil unrest that started on 27 February 1989. Some of the members of CVR have participated in the Venezuelan 1992 coup attempt and November 1992 coup attempt started by Revolutionary Bolivarian Movement-200 led by Hugo Chávez.

In January 1993, it was established as a social organization with the aim of creating a space for the articulation, discussion and implementation of socialism in Venezuela.

In 2000, the party was registered, during 2003 and 2004 it won elections in some regions, becoming a regional party at the end of 2004.

== Electoral history ==
In 2005, it managed to gather the number of states required to start the conversion to a national party. That same year it participated in the 2005 parliamentary election, with Ramsés Augusto Reyes Colmenares being chosen as CRV national secretary general. Later CRV obtained authorization from the Fifth Republic Movement to join its alliance, consolidating itself in some regions where it managed to contribute to the triumph of the Hugo Chávez.

In the 2006 presidential election CRV supported the candidacy of Hugo Chávez again.

On 2013 presidential election and 2024 presidential election CRV endorsed candidacy of Nicolas Maduro.
