= María Bolívar =

Venezuelan politician

- Born: María Josefina Bolívar; 1975 (age 50–51); Maturín, Monagas, Venezuela
- Education: University of Zulia
- Political party: United Democratic Party for Peace and Freedom (PDUPL)
- Spouse: Mario Vieira
- Website: www.mariabolivarpresidenta12

María Josefina Bolívar (born 1975) is a Venezuelan politician and perennial candidate. She was presidential candidate twice for the United Democratic Party for Peace and Freedom (PDUPL) in the presidential elections of 2012 and 2013. She also ran for the same party in the regional elections of 2012 and was candidate for the mayoralty of Maracaibo in the municipal elections of 2013. In 2015 she was nominated as candidate for the 4th circuit of Zulia State in the parliamentary elections, and in 2017 she stood as candidate for the Constituent National Assembly.

== Biography ==
Bolívar was born in Maturín and moved to Maracaibo with her parents. She completed her elementary education in Fe y Alegría and the Epifanía School. In 2002 she graduated from the University of Zulia as a lawyer. Years later she married Portuguese immigrant Mario Vieira, and together they opened the "Mayami" bakery in Maracaibo.

== Political career ==
=== 2012 presidential elections ===
In February 2012 she registered her candidacy for United Democratic Party for Peace and Freedom (PDUPL) for the 2012 presidential elections. On 23 August 2012, during an interview for the news channel Globovisión, she gained notoriety for her inability to understand a question from journalist Aymara Lorenzo about how the candidate was going to control inflation in the country, as well as for her phrase dame una ayudaíta (give me a little help). Bolívar finished in the fifth place in the elections, obtaining 7308 votes, 0.04% of the total.

=== 2013 presidential elections ===
After the death of president Hugo Chávez and the announcement of new presidential elections on 14 April 2013, Bolívar confirmed her new candidacy for PDUPL for the presidency of Venezuela. During her campaign, which started in Caracas, her platform included access to foreign currency for all Venezuelans and free education and other services. She denounced the "media war" waged by candidates Nicolás Maduro and Henrique Capriles. Bolívar received 13 227 votes in the elections, 0.08% of the total, doubling her votes for the same position six months before and finishing in fourth place.

=== Candidacy for governor of Zulia ===
On 12 October 2012 she registered her candidacy for the PDUPL for the regional elections held on 16 December 2012, in which Bolívar competed against Pablo Pérez (Democratic Unity Roundtable incumbent), Iris Rincón (candidate for NUVIPA) and Francisco Arias Cárdenas (candidate for the PSUV). Bolívar again finished in fourth place, with 620 votes, 0.04% of the total.

=== Candidacy for mayor of Maracaibo ===
Bolívar announced in 2013, on the Zulian television channel Aventura Televisión, that she would run as a candidate again, this time for the mayoralty of Maracaibo. She obtained fourth place in the election with 1723 votes, 0.30% of the total.

=== 2015 parliamentary elections ===
In 2015 the politician announced that she would run as PDUPL candidate for the National Assembly for circuit 4 of Zulia, which comprises the Venancio Pulgar, Idelfonso Vásquez, and Antonio Borjas Romero parishes of Maracaibo.

=== 2017 Constituent National Assembly ===
María Bolívar pre-registered and was accepted by the National Electoral Council as a candidate for the 2017 Constituent National Assembly in the Banking-Commerce sector, declaring that we must not abandon "the spaces that open the way to the changes that Venezuelans are demanding".
