= Death and state funeral of Hugo Chávez =

2013 death of President of Venezuela

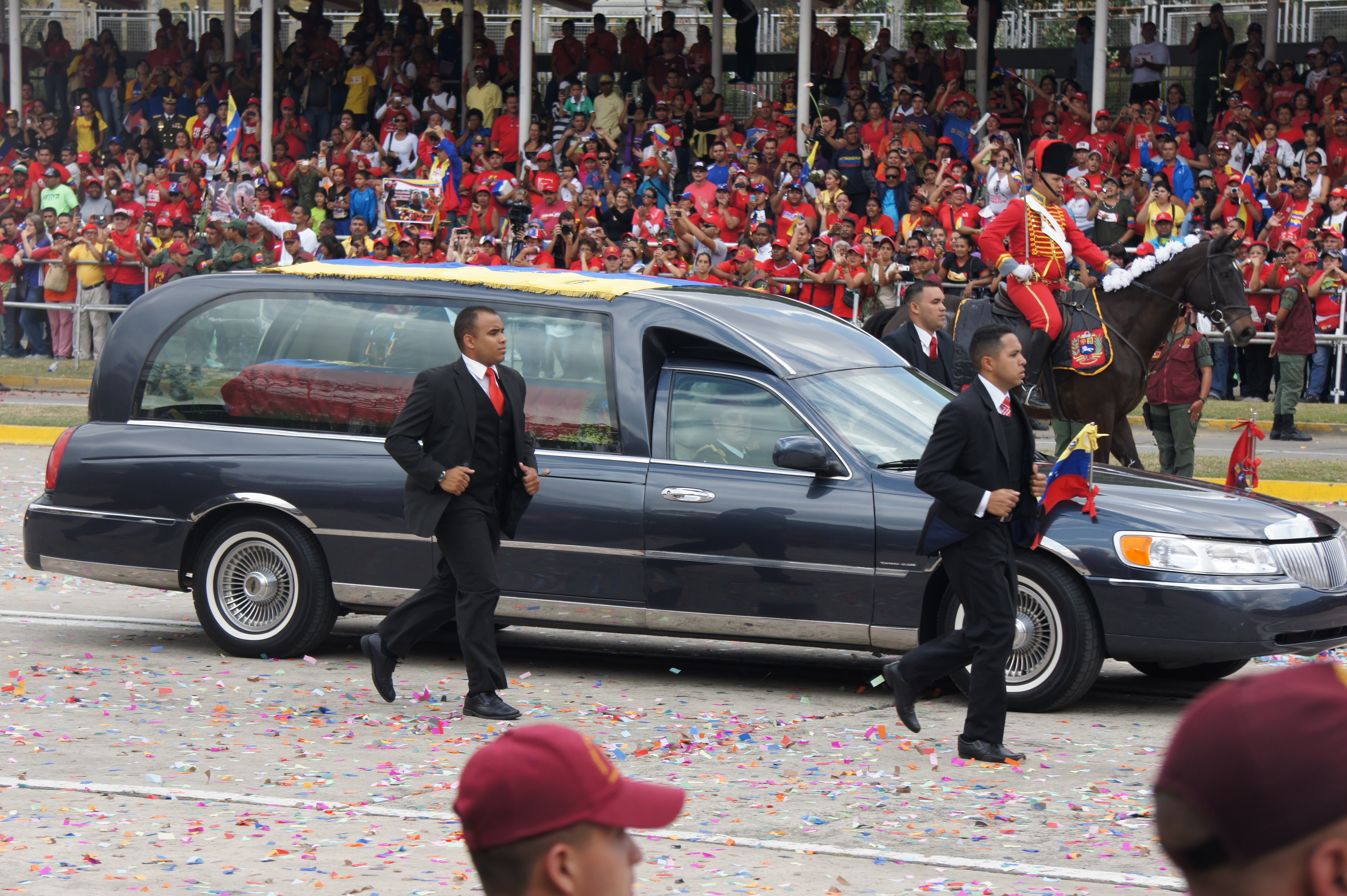
- Hearse carrying Hugo Chávez's remains
- Date: 5 March 2013; 13 years ago
- Location: Caracas, Venezuela
- Cause: Cancer
- Burial: Cuartel de la Montaña (es)

The death of Hugo Chávez, president of Venezuela, was announced by government officials to have been on 5 March 2013 at 16:25 VET (20:55 UTC) in Caracas, Venezuela, from cancer at the age of 58.

Chávez was first elected as president in 1998 and was re-elected in 2000, 2006 and 2012. However, Chávez was unable to be sworn in for a fourth term after the 2012 election due to his illness. Under the terms of the constitution, his death triggered an early presidential election, which was won by his vice president Nicolás Maduro.

== Illness and death ==
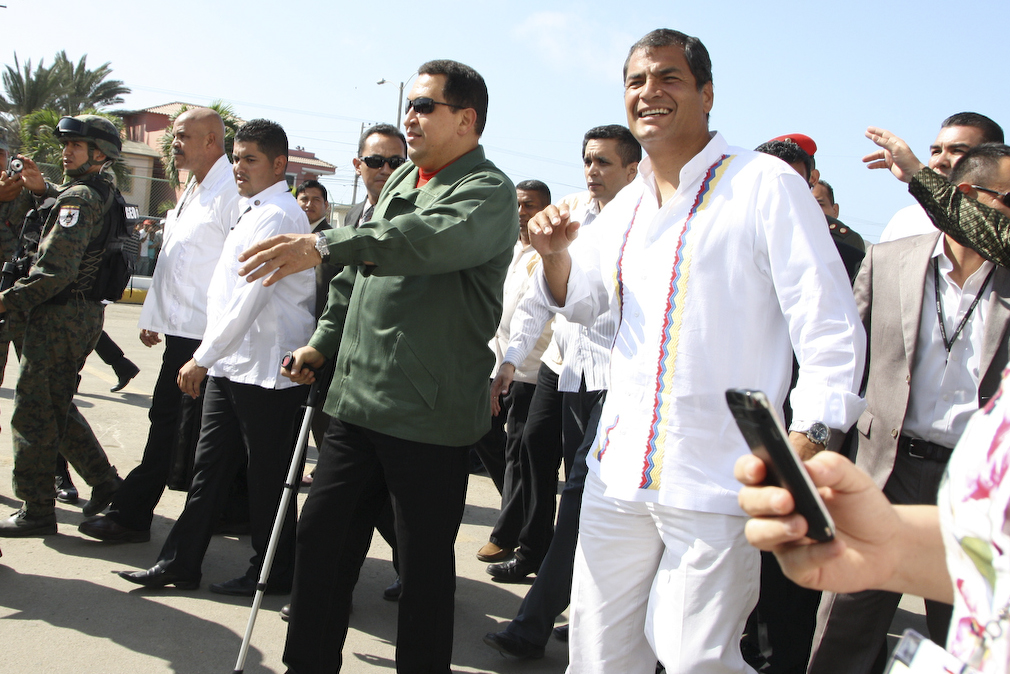
Chávez walking with a cane accompanied by Ecuadorian president Rafael Correa in Caracas in July 2011, shortly after his first cancer surgery

External videos
- Venezuela's V.P. Announces Chavez's Death on The Wall Street Journal

Chávez was diagnosed with cancer following the discovery of a mass in his pelvic region in June 2011. He traveled to Havana, Cuba, where he underwent a surgical operation to remove a malignant cancerous tissue mass 'about the size of a baseball' from his waist. He underwent a second surgical operation in Venezuela one month later. Over the next 12 months, he followed a cycle of chemotherapy. The type of cancer Chávez was diagnosed with was never made public, which fueled speculation over his condition (with speculations from being prostate cancer to colon cancer among others).

In the 2012 presidential election, Chávez was successfully re-elected to a fourth term. Upon returning to Cuba in late November 2012, however, Chávez learned that his cancer had returned and metastasised. He returned briefly to Venezuela in December 2012 to publicly announce his illness and returned to Cuba on 10 December for further cancer treatment, later returning to Venezuela and staying at a Caracas military hospital. Despite rumors by Venezuelan defectors that he died at the end of December, the government assured that Chávez was still alive and provided successive announcements of his return and updates of his health, which were criticised by the country's opposition as the population were unaware of the exact state of his health as well as his location. After the first lung infection (pneumonia) in the last stages of his life, Chávez was intubated nearing the end of December. His breathing worsened until his death in Caracas on 5 March 2013, almost two years after he was first diagnosed.

Vice President Nicolás Maduro announced Chávez's death on a mandatory television cadena (a decree forcing all broadcasters to relay state television programming). In an emotional eulogy Maduro said: "Let there be no weakness, no violence. Let there be no hate. In our hearts there should only be one feeling: Love." Maduro indicated that Chávez had died "after battling a tough illness for nearly two years." He added that police and troops would be deployed across the country "to guarantee the peace." The head of the presidential guard said Chávez died of a massive heart attack after great suffering and had inaudibly mouthed his desire to live. In an interview to the Associated Press, he said that Chávez could not speak but he said with his lips ... "I don't want to die. Please don't let me die". The BBC reported isolated incidents of violence following the announcement of Chávez's death. Although pro-Chávez supporters attacked and burned tents of students who had camped demanding more official information about Chávez's health, there were no reported injuries. Vice President Maduro indicated he had "no doubt" of foul play by "the historical enemies of our fatherland" behind Chávez's illness and death. Defence Minister Diego Morelo Bellavia said that the "Bolivarian" armed forces would be loyal to the vice president and National Assembly and urged supporters and opposition to remain calm.

== Early death rumours ==
After defecting from Venezuela, former bodyguard for Chávez, Leamsy Salazar, stated that he died in December 2012, nearly three months before the 5 March 2013 date was officially announced.

In July 2018, former Attorney General Luisa Ortega Díaz also said that Chávez had actually died in December 2012 and the announcement of his death was delayed for political reasons. In an interview cited by Venezuelan daily El Nacional, the former Chávez supporter said that the Venezuelan president died on 28 December 2012, but his closest allies decided to delay the announcement and never submitted the death certificate to the Office of the Attorney General.

The supposed delay in announcing Chávez's death raised concerns that laws signed in his name during that period were forged for political purposes.

== Reactions ==
=== Domestic ===
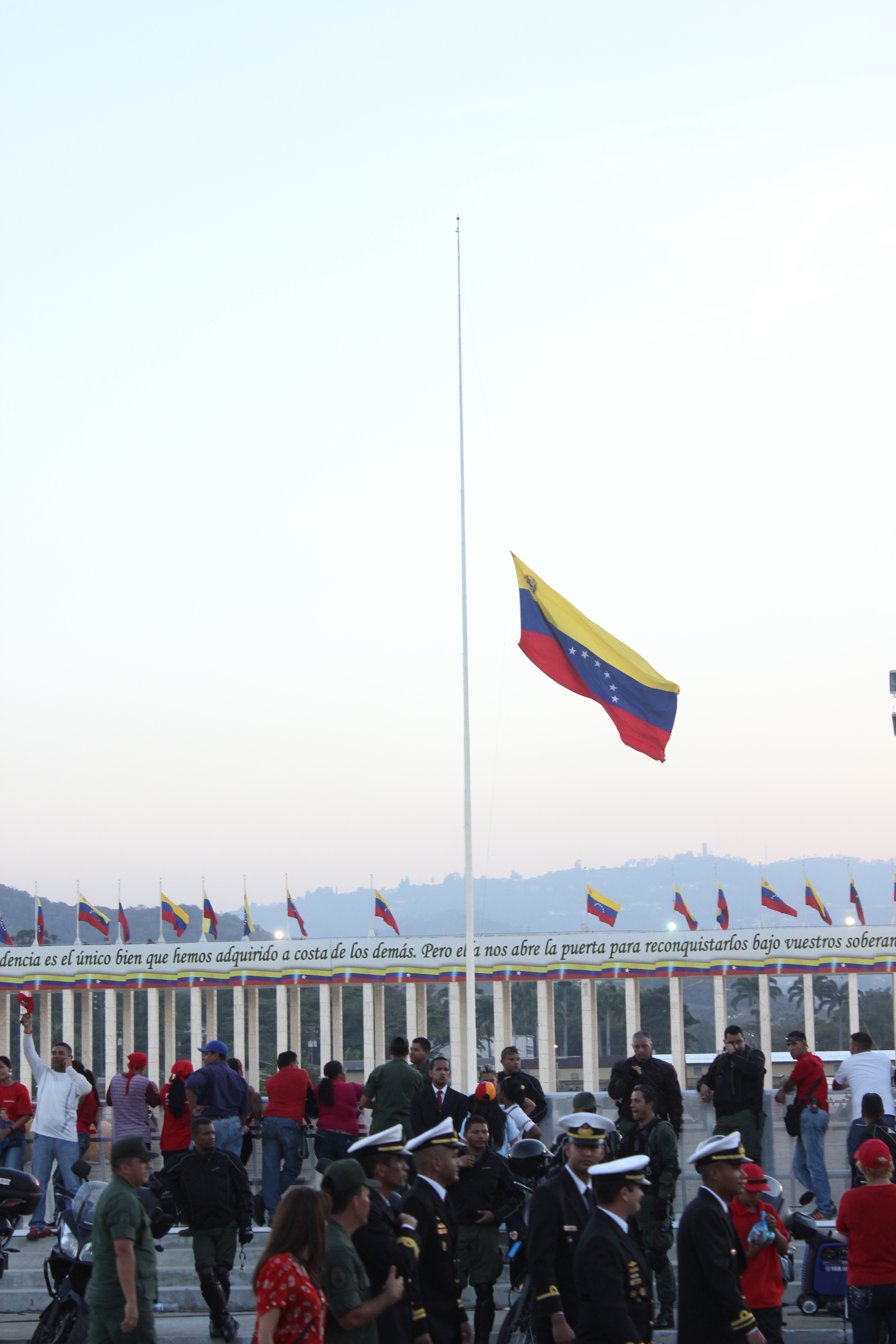
Venezuelan flag at half-mast in mourning for the death of president Chávez

Thousands of people flooded the streets of the capital Caracas. Many cried and hugged in public shows of emotion. Women were weeping at Miraflores Palace. With a mixture of joy and sadness Chávez supporters shared their impressions after him a last farewell: "That man emanates a force forward and his face says my people.". People left work for the day upon hearing the news, shops and offices shut and cars and buses filled the streets.

Opposition leader and opponent in the 2012 election, Henrique Capriles, called on the government to "act in strict accordance with its constitutional duties." He also added his condolences to Chávez's family saying "we were adversaries, but never enemies". Acting President Nicolás Maduro said he believed Chávez was assassinated by Venezuela's "historical enemies" (widely assumed to mean the United States), and that a "scientific commission" would investigate this possibility. The U.S. State Department denied any American involvement in Chávez's death, calling the claim "absurd".

On the first anniversary of Chávez's death on 6 March 2014, tens of thousands of his supporters marched through cities across Venezuela. This was coupled with the 2014 Venezuelan protests featuring pro and anti-government demonstrations.

=== Foreign ===
UN Secretary-General Ban Ki-moon's office issued a statement expressing condolences.

Reactions within the Americas by citizens occurred outside Venezuela's embassies all throughout Latin America.

==== Latin America and the Caribbean ====
Secretary General of Organization of American States José Miguel Insulza ordered the body's flags to be flown at half-mast and the convening of a special meeting of the Permanent Council in memory of Chávez.

After announcing Hugo Chávez's death, Bolivian president Evo Morales broke down and cried on national television while paying tribute to Chávez; Morales then decreed seven days of mourning in Bolivia after Chávez's death. Brazilian president Dilma Rousseff, who had cancelled a scheduled trip to Argentina to meet President Kirchner, led a minute of silence in Brasília. Rousseff decreed three days of mourning. Rousseff's predecessor, Luiz Inácio Lula da Silva, also expressed grief. Salvadorian president Mauricio Funes and Chilean president Sebastián Piñera both praised Chávez's strong character, and the Chilean government declared three days of national mourning for Chávez.

The Cuban Council of State decreed two days of official mourning, from 6 am on 6 March to midnight on 7 March, and a third day of national mourning on 8 March. The presidents of Dominican Republic, Haiti, Uruguay and Ecuador all decreed three days of mourning for Chávez.

Nicaraguan president Daniel Ortega declared seven days of mourning. Colombian president Juan Manuel Santos, Mexican president Enrique Peña Nieto lamented the death of Chávez; The Mexican Ministry of Foreign Affairs issued a press release expressing condolences and "our feeling of fraternity". Colombia ordered its 15 consulates in Venezuela temporarily closed to observe the days of mourning. Guyanese president Donald Ramotar and Guatemalan president Otto Pérez Molina regretted losing a "friend". Ramotar and Honduran president Porfirio Lobo praised Chávez for his contribution to regional integration; the National Congress of Honduras addressed a minute of silence.

Trinidad and Tobago and Jamaica said that special arrangements would be made for an official tribute to Chávez. Uruguay announced that President José Mujica was in Argentina for a summit when Chávez died, but that he would fly to Caracas with Argentine President Cristina Fernández de Kirchner to attend the funeral. Argentina declared three days of mourning.

==== North America ====
Canadian prime minister Stephen Harper offered his condolences; former Prime Minister Jean Chrétien eulogised in a televised interview.

Suggestions of American foul play, implying that Chávez had been poisoned or somehow infected with cancer (arguing a plot reminiscent to the Yasser Arafat death controversy and the attempts against Fidel Castro), were vehemently denied by the U.S. Department of State as "absurd".

In Miami, some Venezuelans joyfully celebrated Chávez's death, and were cautiously optimistic of new elections for Chávez's successor; an estimated 189,219 Venezuelans live in the United States, most of whom are anti-Chávez. United States President Barack Obama reaffirmed the support of the U.S. for the Venezuelan people and its interest in developing a constructive relationship with the Venezuelan government. Former president Jimmy Carter complimented Chávez's commitment to improving the lives of Venezuelans. According to a statement posted at the Carter Center website, Carter and his wife Rosalynn "came to know a man who expressed a vision to bring profound changes to his country to benefit especially those people who had felt neglected and marginalized."

==== Africa ====
Nkosazana Dlamini-Zuma, chairperson of the African Union Commission, conveyed her condolences to the family, government and people of Venezuela. The organisation observed a minute of silence at the A.U. headquarters on 8 March during the celebration of the International Women's Day.

Algerian president Abdelaziz Bouteflika, Gambian president Yahya Jammeh, Mauritanian president Mohamed Ould Abdelaziz, Sahrawi Republic president Mohamed Abdelaziz, South African president Jacob Zuma, Sudanese president Omar al-Bashir, Tanzanian president Jakaya Kikwete, all expressed their sorrow and offered their "deepest condolences". Jammeh proclaimed two national prayer days at Gambian mosques and churches for Chávez, on 8 and 10 March 2013. The Sahrawi government declared a day of national mourning.

==== Asia ====
Afghanistan president Hamid Karzai, President of Armenia Serzh Sargsyan, Azerbaijani president Ilham Aliyev, Chinese president Hu Jintao and General Secretary of the Chinese Communist Party Xi Jinping, deputy director-general of the Taiwanese Foreign Ministry Calvin Ho, and Indian prime minister Manmohan Singh issued statements of "heartfelt condolences".

Pakistan president Asif Ali Zardari and Prime Minister Raja Pervaiz Ashraf, President of the Palestinian National Authority Mahmoud Abbas, Turkmenistan president Gurbanguly Berdimuhamedow, as well as Vietnamese leaders – including Party general secretary Nguyễn Phú Trọng, Prime Minister Nguyễn Tấn Dũng, and National Assembly chairman Nguyễn Sinh Hùng – also expressed condolences; some lauded Chávez's achievements. Memorial services were scheduled to be held in Ramallah and other cities in the West Bank and senior Palestinian officials paid their respects at the Venezuelan Embassy in Ramallah. In Gaza City streets were decorated with Venezuelan flags and posters of Chávez. Hamas, leading the de facto government of the Gaza Strip, lauded Chávez as a "great leader"; the Syrian Arab News Agency paid homage to Chávez for taking "an honourable stance regarding the conspiracy against Syria". Iran declared a day of national mourning.

==== Europe ====
French president François Hollande and British foreign secretary William Hague were "saddened". Irish president Michael D. Higgins sent condolences, and Sinn Féin leader Gerry Adams also paid tribute. Italian president Giorgio Napolitano said he felt "painful". The Spanish government extended its condolences, as did Portuguese president Aníbal Cavaco Silva.

Swedish Prime Minister Fredrik Reinfeldt stated that Chávez "undeniably affected his country and the entire region" and hoped for greater democracy and respect for human rights in Venezuela; foreign minister Carl Bildt criticized Chávez's policies, saying that he had "plunder[ed] the oil wealth of [his] country".

President of Russia Vladimir Putin and prime minister Dmitry Medvedev expressed their "sincere condolences". Russia would send a delegation consisting of Rosneft president Igor Sechin, Trade and Industry minister Denis Manturov, Rostec CEO Sergey Chemezov, Federation Council speaker Valentina Matviyenko and foreign minister Sergei Lavrov. Serbian president Tomislav Nikolić and prime minister Ivica Dačić sent condolences and lamented the loss of "a friend". The Serbian cabinet also announced that Chávez would be posthumously honoured with the Order of the Republic of Serbia. Belarus declared three days of mourning.

In the Vatican, a condolence letter was read during a meeting of Cardinals prior to the papal conclave, during the sede vacante.

In the European Union, European Council President Herman Van Rompuy and European Commission President José Manuel Barroso said that they had received the news of Chávez's death with "sadness."

==== Oceania ====
Australian Foreign Minister Bob Carr and New Zealand Prime Minister John Key expressed condolences "to the Chávez family and the people of Venezuela". However, Key, who was on a diplomatic trip to Mexico, Colombia, Chile and Brazil, did not attend the funeral although meetings had been postponed due to Latin American leaders attending, and was criticized by ex-Greens MP Keith Locke, Toby Manhire and others.

== Funeral ==
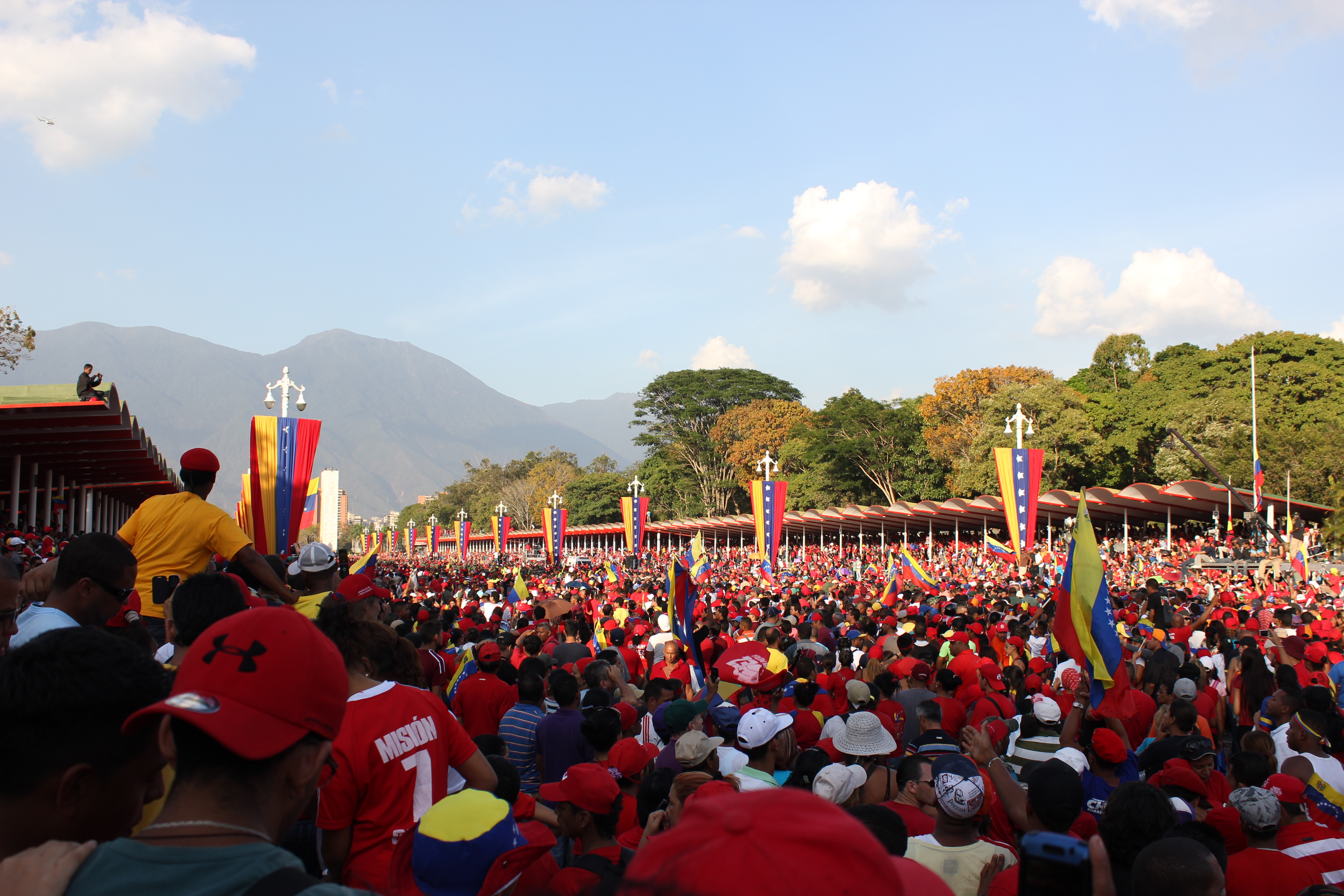
Chávez's funeral procession

Foreign minister Elías Jaua decreed seven days of mourning for Chávez. Chávez's body was taken to the Military Academy in Caracas on 6 March 2013, accompanied by large numbers of supporters who joined the procession at the military parade grounds (the Heroes Avenue) and was left lying in state for the public to visit for three days. The state funeral was held in Caracas on 8 March 2013. Acting President Nicolás Maduro originally stated that Chávez's body would be embalmed and permanently displayed after the state funeral in a transparent sarcophagus at a military museum in the former site of the Military Academy in La Planicie Barracks at the 23 de Enero district west of the city proper. However, due to difficulties in finding an expert and the uncertainties of plastination in which the weather plays a substantial part, Maduro announced that the body would not be embalmed in time. Maduro extended national mourning from 4 to 11 days to coincide with the transportation of the body to the military museum (now Museum of the Revolution) at La Planicie Barracks, which was renamed Mountain Barracks as it was, not by accident, the place which Chávez captured and used as a command centre in the brief coup of 1992, and where he uttered his famous words "Por ahora" (For now) to the press.

For the final arrangements a funeral service was arranged, with the casket leaving the Military Academy grounds in Fort Tiuna on 17 March 2013 under full military honours including references to Ltn. Cnl. Chávez's home battalion (the Apure Braves 414th Armored Battalion) with the marching song "Patria Querida" (Fatherland Beloved) played in slow time, a 21-gun salute, and a Military Aviation (formerly Venezuelan Air Force) flyover by Sukhoi Su-30 fighters in a missing man formation. Government party militias in their light motorcycles followed the motorcade (itself surrounded by Army mounted guards) with a large following of (mostly poor) citizens, with final arrival honors paid upon arrival at the Mountain Barracks. Bolivian President Evo Morales, Maduro and Chávez's brother Adan and daughter Maria Gabiela each gave speeches before the flag folding and dedication ceremony. The national flag covering the casket was handed to Chávez's mother, Elena Frías de Chávez, on behalf of the armed forces and the nation.

=== Foreign dignitary attendees ===
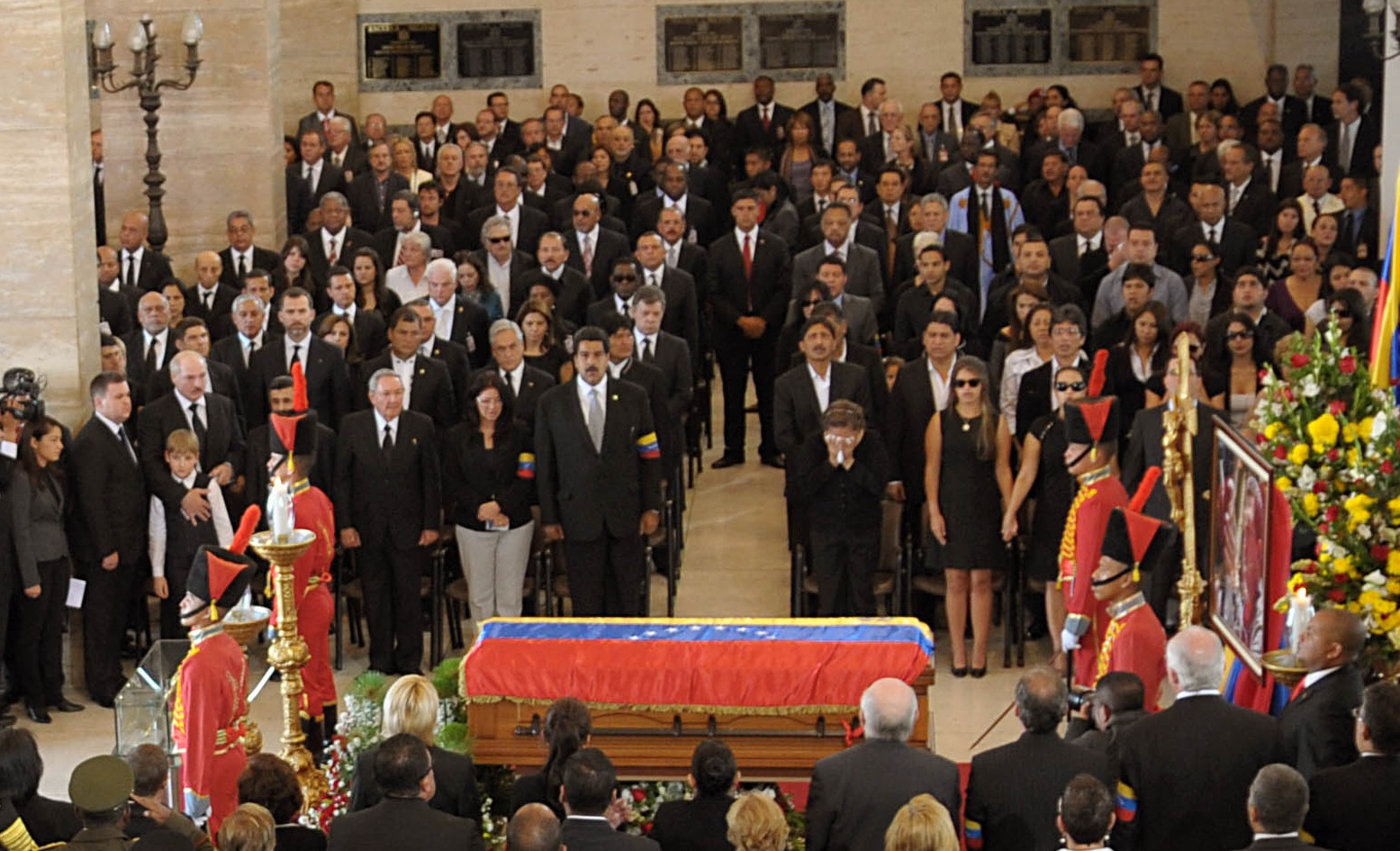
Foreign dignitaries, Chávez's family and Venezuelan officials gathered around Chávez's casket

The funeral was attended by 72 representatives of 50 countries.

Heads of state and government
Antigua and Barbuda	Prime Minister	Baldwin Spencer
Argentina	President	Cristina Fernández de Kirchner
Aruba	Prime Minister	Mike Eman
Belarus	President	Alexander Lukashenko
Bolivia	President	Evo Morales
Brazil	President	Dilma Rousseff
Chile	President	Sebastián Piñera
Colombia	President	Juan Manuel Santos
Costa Rica	President	Laura Chinchilla
Cuba	President	Raúl Castro
Curaçao	Prime Minister	Daniel Hodge
Dominica	Prime Minister	Roosevelt Skerrit
Dominican Republic	President	Danilo Medina
Ecuador	President	Rafael Correa
El Salvador	President	Mauricio Funes
Equatorial Guinea	President	Teodoro Obiang
Guatemala	President	Otto Pérez Molina
Guyana	President	Donald Ramotar
Haiti	President; Prime Minister	Michel Martelly; Laurent Lamothe
Honduras	President	Porfirio Lobo Sosa
Iran	President	Mahmoud Ahmadinejad
Jamaica	Prime Minister	Portia Simpson-Miller
Mexico	President	Enrique Peña Nieto
Nicaragua	President	Daniel Ortega
Panama	President	Ricardo Martinelli
Peru	President	Ollanta Humala
Saint Kitts and Nevis	Prime Minister	Denzil Douglas
Saint Lucia	Prime Minister	Kenny Anthony
Saint Vincent and the Grenadines	Prime Minister	Ralph Gonsalves
Suriname	President	Dési Bouterse
Trinidad and Tobago	Prime Minister	Kamla Persad-Bissessar
Uruguay	President	José Mujica
Government representatives
China	President's Special Envoy, Vice Chairman of the Standing Committee of the National People's Congress	Zhang Ping
Colombia	Foreign Minister; Mayor of Bogotá	María Ángela Holguín; Gustavo Petro
Equatorial Guinea	First Lady	Constancia Mangue
France	Minister of Overseas France; Guadeloupe R.C. president	Victorin Lurel; Josette Borel-Lincertin
Grenada	Minister of Foreign Affairs	Nicholas Steele
Holy See	Bishop of San Cristóbal	Mario Moronta
India	Minister of Corporate Affairs	Sachin Pilot
Netherlands	Minister of State	Hans van den Broek
Nicaragua	First Lady	Rosario Murillo
Portugal	Minister of State and Foreign Minister	Paulo Portas
Russia	Minister of Foreign Affairs; Federation Council Speaker; Minister of Trade and Industry	Sergey Lavrov; Valentina Matviyenko; Denis Manturov
Sahrawi Republic	President's Special Envoy, Minister Delegate for Latin America	Hach Ahmed Baricalla
Spain	Prince of Asturias	Felipe
Syria	Minister of Presidential Affairs	Mansour Fadlallah Azzam
Turkey	Deputy Prime Minister	Beşir Atalay
United Kingdom	Ambassador	Catherine Nettleton
United States	Chargé d'affaires Congressman	James M. Derham; Gregory Meeks
Vietnam	Deputy Prime Minister	Hoàng Trung Hải
Heads of multilateral organizations
European Union	Head of Delegation	Antonio Cardoso Mota
Organization of American States	Secretary General	José Miguel Insulza
Union of South American Nations	Secretary General	Ali Rodriguez Araque
United Nations	Executive Secretary of ECLAC	Alicia Bárcena Ibarra
Inter-American Development Bank	President	Luis Alberto Moreno

Argentinian president Cristina Fernández de Kirchner was amongst the first heads of state to arrive in Venezuela on Tuesday 5 March. She visited the chapel at the military hospital to pay her final respects on Thursday before returning home, citing health reasons. Brazilian president Dilma Rousseff attended a wake on Thursday at the military academy before returning to Brazil on Friday morning. Former President Lula da Silva accompanied President Rousseff and departed before the funeral service.

Former Canadian prime minister Jean Chrétien and his wife Aline attended the funeral, along with former Colombian senator Piedad Córdoba, former Honduran president Manuel Zelaya, and former Paraguayan president Fernando Lugo.

Other attendees included Former US congressman William Delahunt, President of the Russian Rosneft oil company Igor Sechin and CEO of Rostec Sergei Chemezov; Nikolay Lukashenko, son of the Belarusian president; Alexis Tsipras, the leader of SYRIZA in Greece (later Prime Minister of Greece); from Spain were Cayo Lara and Willy Meyer Pleite (MEP). Formula One driver Pastor Maldonado, American civil rights activist Jesse Jackson and actor Sean Penn also attended.

Honour guards were provided by the cadets of the component service academies of the Venezuelan Bolivarian Military University and by personnel of the Presidential Honor Guard Brigade, among others. The Simón Bolívar Symphony Orchestra led by Gustavo Dudamel provided musical accompaniment during the state funeral services.

== Tomb ==
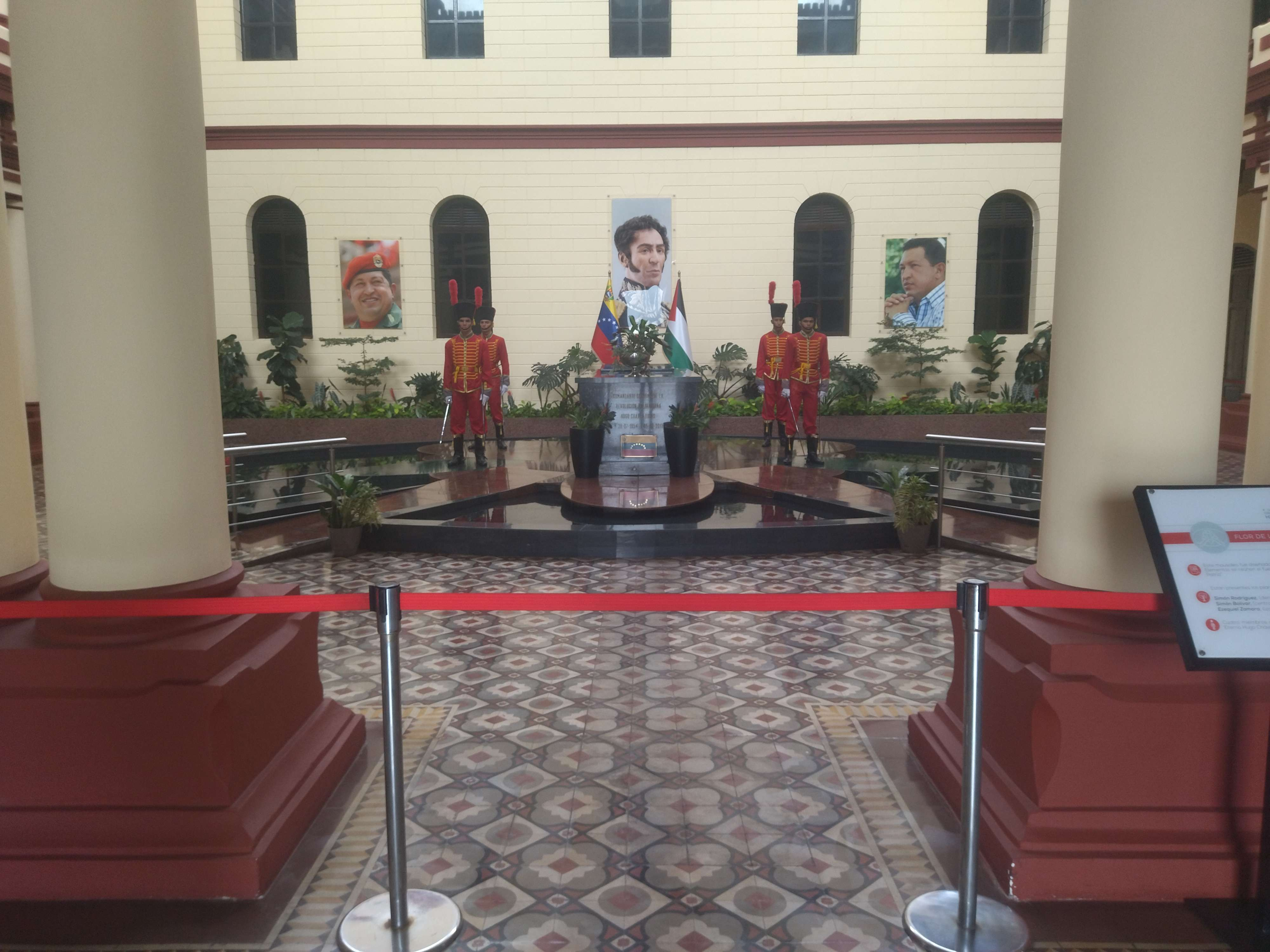
Four soldiers in front of the tomb of Hugo Chávez Frías.

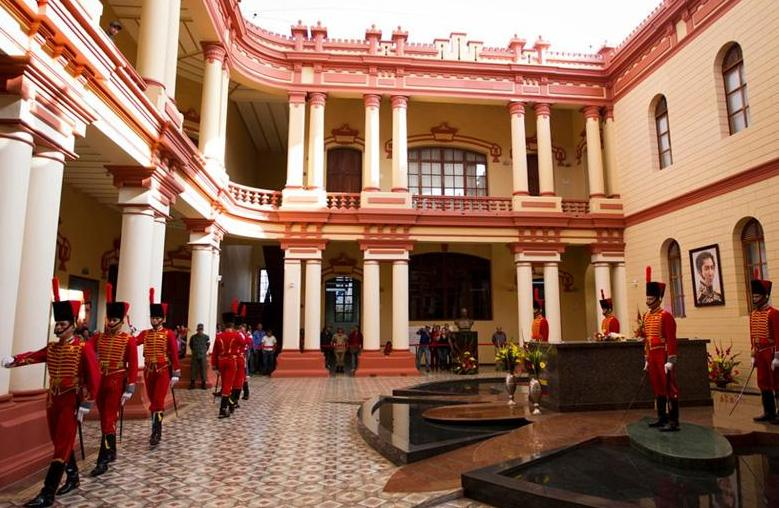
Mausoleum of Hugo Chávez

Echoing strong national sentiment the Government elevated a proposal to the National Assembly (Parliament) for a statute amendment that would allow placing the late president's body near that of Simón Bolívar (the Liberator and father of the country) in the National Pantheon of Venezuela, a secular building housing the remains and/or cenotaphs to independence war heroes and former presidents. The statute (still unamended) requires that a number of years pass before any such moves. Chávez's remains were placed instead at a mausoleum (built in 99 days) at the now Revolution Museum (formerly Army Museum) at the Mountain Barracks (former site of the Military Academy in La Planicie Barracks). The mausoleum to Hugo Chávez consists of a granite sarcophagus atop a flat architectural composition of four leaves entitled Flower of the Four Elements by modernist architect 'Fruto' (Jose Fructoso) Vivas, a national Architecture Price and designer of the Venezuelan Pavilion at Hanover in 2000) and has a permanent ceremonial four-man honor guard provided by the Presidential Honor Guard Brigade, which is changed every hour. A 19th century cannon is fired every afternoon from the Fort marking the time of his death by a National Militia gun crew. Both ceremonies are open to the public. After the US operation to capture Nicolás Maduro on 3 January 2026, Colombian president Gustavo Petro claimed the mausoleum had been bombed, but the Hugo Chávez Foundation denied this on Instagram, while later reports confirmed the mausoleum was destroyed.

== Foreign media commentary ==
The BBC quoted analysts as saying Chávez' death could alter the balance against the so-called "pink tide" in favour of centrist governments. It also suggested a possible economic impact to Venezuelan oil sales due to them being below market prices relative to some neighbouring countries, especially in the Caribbean. Americas Quarterly editor Christopher Sabatini suggested that the "Chávez myth" would outlive his achievements. Prior to his death, Venezuela's recognition of Abkhazia and South Ossetia were also highlighted as dependent on Chávez.
