= 2013 Venezuelan presidential election =

- 14 April 2013
- Registered: 18,904,364
- Turnout: 79.65% (▼0.55pp)
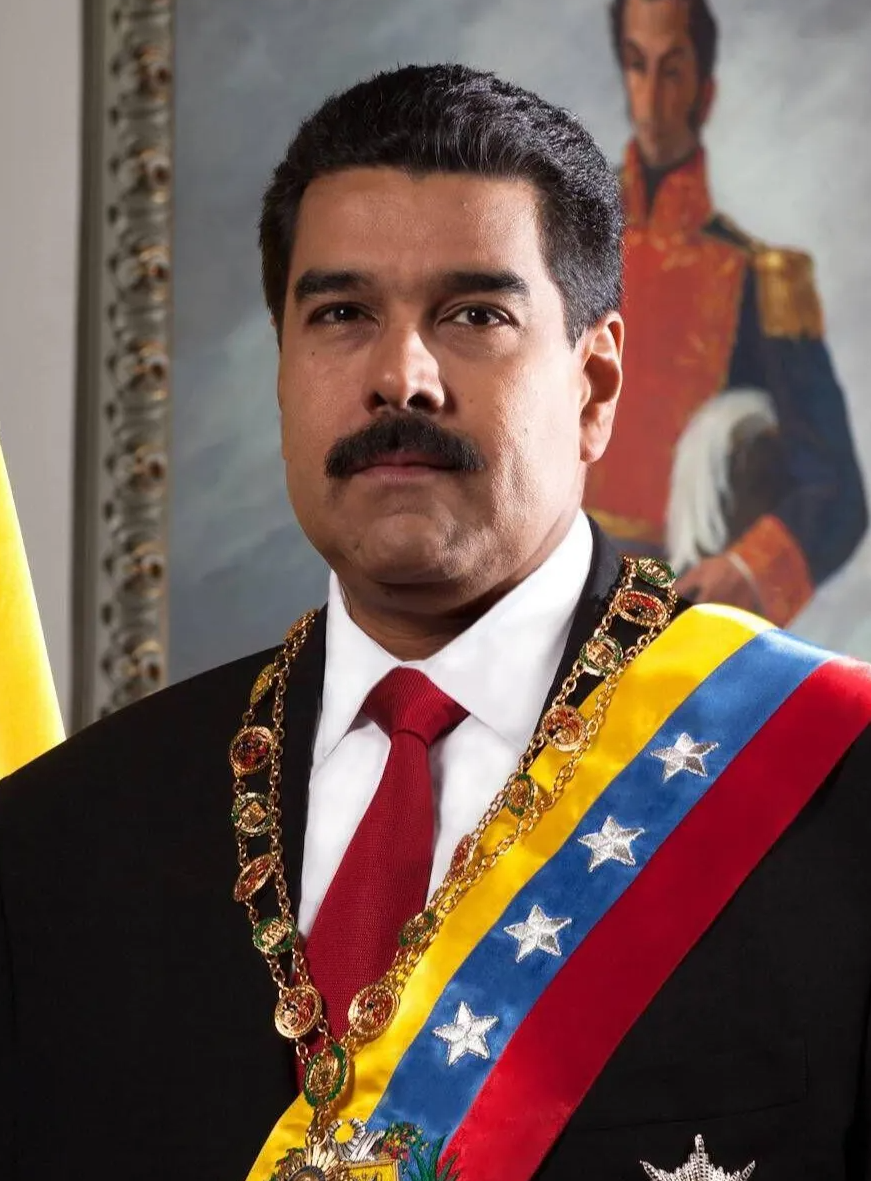

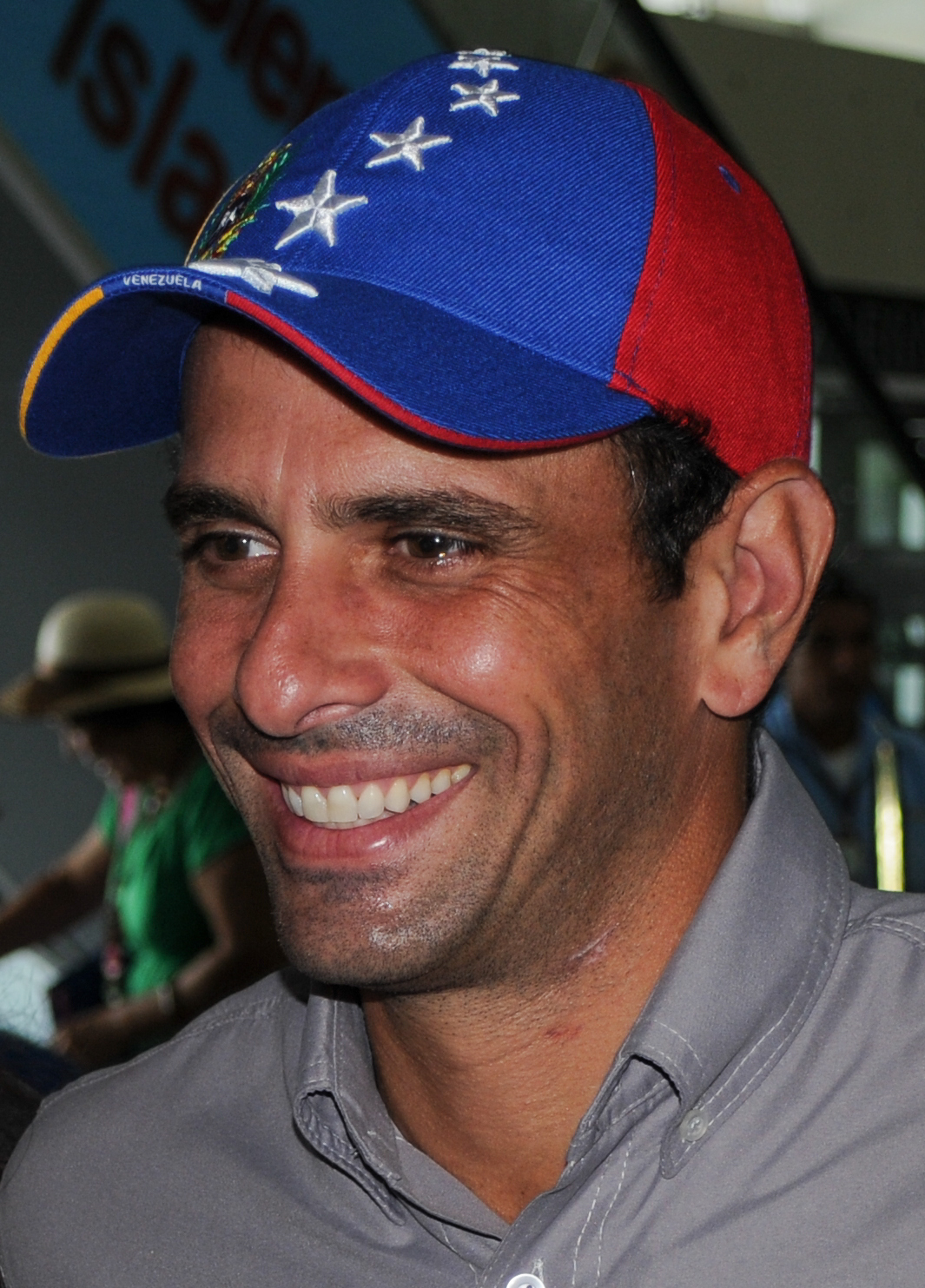
Candidate	Nicolás Maduro	Henrique Capriles
Party	PSUV	PJ
Alliance	GPPSB	MUD
Popular vote	7,587,579	7,363,980
Percentage	50.62%	49.12%
- Results per state

Results by municipality
Nicolás Maduro
40–49%
50–59%
60-69%
70-79%
80-89%
90-99%
Henrique Capriles
40–49%
50–59%
60-69%
70-79%
80-89%
President before election
Nicolás Maduro (acting)
PSUV
Elected President
Nicolás Maduro
PSUV

Presidential elections were held in Venezuela on 14 April 2013 following the death of President Hugo Chávez on 5 March 2013. Nicolás Maduro—who had assumed the role of acting president since Chávez's death—was declared winner with a narrow victory over his opponent Henrique Capriles, the Governor of Miranda. Capriles had run in the previous election less than a year before, losing to Chávez by an 11-point margin. This time the margin of victory was much smaller (being 1.49%), and thus became the closest presidential election of the country since the 1968 election. This was also the last Venezuelan presidential election considered free.

Capriles did not accept the results of the elections, claiming election irregularities. Capriles initially called for an audit of the remaining 46% of votes, asserting that this would show that he had won the election. The election council agreed to carry out an audit, and planned to do so in May. Capriles later asked a full audit of the electoral registry, with validation of all fingerprints and signatures in the records. On 12 June 2013 National Electoral Council (CNE) announced that the audit had found no discrepancy with the initial results and confirmed Maduro's electoral victory.

Maduro was sworn in as the new head of state on 19 April. The Supreme Court of Justice denied Capriles' appeal on 7 August 2013.

== Background ==
Following Chávez's victory in the 2012 presidential election, he went to Cuba for cancer treatment, returning to Venezuela to stay at an army hospital for continued treatment. On and after 10 January, opponents of Chávez unsuccessfully called for presidential elections to be held after he was unable to be sworn into office due to his illness. Unofficial campaigning had already begun before Chávez's death.

== Electoral process ==
Since 1998, elections in Venezuela have been highly automated, and administered by the National Electoral Council, with poll workers drafted via a lottery of registered voters. Polling places are equipped with multiple high-tech touch-screen DRE voting machines, one to a "mesa electoral", or voting "table". After the vote is cast, each machine prints out a paper ballot, or VVPAT, which is inspected by the voter and deposited in a ballot box belonging to the machine's table. The voting machines perform in a stand-alone fashion, disconnected from any network until the polls close. Voting session closure at each of the voting stations in a given polling center is determined either by the lack of further voters after the lines have emptied, or by the hour, at the discretion of the president of the voting table.

As part of the election administration the National Electoral Council planned a post-election audit of 54% of polling places, comparing the electronic records with the paper trail.

== Candidates ==
=== United Socialist Party ===
Venezuela's foreign minister announced Nicolás Maduro as interim president. Hugo Chávez had chosen Maduro as his successor, and Maduro became the presidential candidate for the United Socialist Party of Venezuela.

=== Democratic Unity Roundtable ===
The opposition agreed on 2012 candidate Henrique Capriles as the candidate to run against Maduro. Capriles announced that he accepted the nomination and would compete against Maduro.

=== Other candidates ===
- Reina Sequera, union leader and former presidential candidate of the Workers' Power party.
- María Bolívar, lawyer and owner of the bakery "Mayami" in Zulia state and candidate for the United Democratic Party for Peace and Freedom (PDUPL).
- Eusebio Méndez, Christian pastor and candidate of New Vision for My Country (NUVIPA).
- Julio Mora, nominee of the Democratic Unity Party (UDEMO).

== Campaign ==
The most pressing issues were the high murder rate, particularly in the capital, the state of the economy, and land rights. The opposition accused Maduro of trying to use Chávez's memory and image to win votes.

The campaign was characterised by insults from both sides. Examples include Maduro calling Capriles "Prince of the Bourgeoisie" and "capricious". In the campaign, Maduro sang a rap song in which he described his opponent as "the little bourgeois shit who shits himself of fear when the people raise their voice". He also implied that Capriles was gay, referring to him being unmarried. Capriles then said he loves so many women he can not decide. He also declared that Maduro's wife was ugly and asked who wants to be with her.

Diosdado Cabello, leader of the PSUV, expressed doubts about the credibility of the election, while Maduro said he was ready to accept the result. The last day of campaigning was 11 April.

On 12 April, Vice President Jorge Arreaza announced on national television that two Colombians had been arrested who had been posing as Venezuelan military officials and sought to disrupt the election. He also announced the finding of an arms cache said to be linked to Salvadoran mercenaries the government had previously accused of plotting to kill Maduro.

Over the weekend before the election Maduro made comments in private suggesting a potential "détente" in United States–Venezuela relations. Former Governor of New Mexico Bill Richardson, who was in Venezuela during the election as an Organization of American States (OAS) representative, recounted how Maduro personally told him he "want[ed] to improve the relationship with the U.S. [and] regularize the relationship."

== Opinion polls ==
Pollster	Date	Maduro	Capriles	Lead
Hinterlaces	February 2013	50	36	14
Datanálisis	March 2013	49.2	34.8	14.4
Hinterlaces	March 2013	53	35	18
IVAD	March 2013	53.8	31.6	22.2
Dataincorp	March 2013	61	26	35
Hinterlaces	March 2013	55	35	20
IVAD	March 2013	53.8	30.8	23.0
GIS XXI	March 2013	55.3	44.7	10.6
IVAD	March 2013	53.3	34.7	18.6
Datamática	April 2013	34.9	39.7	4.8
DatinCorp	April 2013	44	43	1
Hinterlaces	April 2013	54	37	17
Datamática	April 2013	30.6	42.1	11.5
Datanálisis	April 2013	54.8	45.1	9.7
Results	14 April 2013	50.6	49.1	1.5

== Conduct ==
According to the National Electoral Council (CNE), 170 foreign observers were invited to witness the election. Maduro—like his predecessor Chávez—was able to use government resources which included funds, establishments and workers to promote himself during his electoral campaigning.

Following the death of Chávez, the Maduro campaign used Hugo Chávez's cult of personality and Bolivarian propaganda to bolster electoral support. Throughout the campaign, Maduro had continued using similar anti-US rhetoric ad motifs as Chávez had in the past.

== Results ==
The results came as a surprise, as Maduro was leading by double digit figures in most opinion polls conducted two weeks before the election. Furthering the unexpected closeness of the race was that Chávez had defeated Capriles comfortably in October 2012 by a margin of more than 10%.

The voter turnout of 80% was less than one percentage point lower than in the October election.

Candidate	Party	Votes	%
Nicolás Maduro	Great Patriotic Pole	7,587,579	50.62
Henrique Capriles	Democratic Unity Roundtable	7,363,980	49.12
Eusebio Mendez	New Vision for my Country	19,498	0.13
María Bolívar	United Democratic Party for Peace and Freedom	13,309	0.09
Reina Sequera	Worker's Party	4,241	0.03
Julio Mora	Democratic Unity Party	1,936	0.01
Total		14,990,543	100.00
Valid votes		14,990,543	99.56
Invalid/blank votes		66,937	0.44
Total votes		15,057,480	100.00
Registered voters/turnout		18,904,364	79.65
Source: CNE

=== By state ===
States/districts won by Nicolás Maduro
States/districts won by Henrique Capriles

	Nicolás Maduro GPP		Henrique Capriles MUD		Others Various		Margin		State total
State	#	%	#	%	#	%	#	%	#
Capital District	651,062	51.32	611,359	48.19	6,202	0.49	39,703	3.13	1,268,623
Amazonas	38,271	52.45	34,591	47.41	93	0.14	3,680	5.04	72,955
Anzoátegui	383,125	47.32	424,685	52.45	1,775	0.23	−41,560	−5.13	809,585
Apure	142,023	61.76	87,610	38.09	326	0.15	54,413	23.67	229,959
Aragua	512,379	54.05	432,265	45.60	3,249	0.35	80,114	8.45	947,893
Barinas	214,671	52.18	196,138	47.68	531	0.14	18,533	4.50	411,340
Bolívar	351,988	47.87	381,075	51.83	2,084	0.29	−29,087	−3.96	735,147
Carabobo	610,625	50.51	595,241	49.24	2,969	0.25	15,384	1.27	1,208,635
Cojedes	108,018	61.16	68,264	38.65	318	0.19	39,754	22.51	176,600
Delta Amacuro	51,207	61.63	31,700	38.15	180	0.22	19,507	23.48	83,087
Falcón	266,239	53.03	234,747	46.76	1,033	0.22	31,492	6.27	502,019
Guárico	230,632	59.28	157,766	40.55	598	0.17	72,866	18.73	388,996
Lara	470,203	47.71	512,604	52.02	2,541	0.27	−42,401	−4.31	985,348
Mérida	202,866	42.88	269,383	56.94	791	0.18	−66,517	−14.06	473,040
Miranda	737,126	47.29	815,128	52.30	6,252	0.41	−78,002	−5.01	1,558,506
Monagas	262,547	55.46	209,833	44.33	947	0.21	52,714	11.13	473,327
Nueva Esparta	125,143	46.90	141,236	52.94	395	0.16	−16,093	−6.04	266,774
Portuguesa	303,982	65.45	159,085	34.25	1355	0.30	144,897	31.20	464,422
Sucre	269,494	57.48	198,706	42.38	619	0.14	70,788	15.10	468,619
Táchira	235,303	36.97	400,121	62.87	906	0.19	−164,818	−25.90	636,330
Trujillo	233,892	59.78	156,449	39.99	852	0.23	77,443	20.45	391,193
Vargas	118,752	57.08	88,392	42.49	882	0.43	30,360	14.59	208,026
Yaracuy	184,337	56.53	140,997	43.23	753	0.24	43,240	13.30	326,087
Zulia	878,483	47.68	960,383	52.13	3,278	0.19	−81,900	−4.45	1,842,144
Foreign	4,509	7.43	56,090	92.47	53	0.09	−51,581	−87.04	60,652
Inhospitable	702	83.97	132	15.78	2	0.23	574	68.19	836
Totals:	7,587,579	50.61	7,363,980	49.12	38,984	0.27	223,599	1.49	14,990,543

Source: National Electoral Council

=== Close states ===
Red font color denotes states won by President Maduro; blue denotes those won by Governor Capriles.

States/districts where the margin of victory was under 5%:

1. Carabobo 1.27%
2. Capital District 3.13%
3. Bolívar 3.96%
4. Lara 4.31%
5. Zulia 4.45%
6. Barinas 4.50%

States where margin of victory was more than 5% but less than 10%:

1. Miranda 5.01%
2. Amazonas 5.04%
3. Anzoátegui 5.13%
4. Nueva Esparta 6.04%
5. Falcón 6.27%
6. Aragua 8.45%

== Aftermath ==
Maduro's narrow defeat of Capriles created uncertainty behind the chavista movement on whether the Bolivarian revolution could continue without Chávez. According to critics, due to the PSUV's loss of popularity, the Bolivarian government increased political polarization and began drafting laws to make mechanisms of legal repression against the opposition to maintain power. The Maduro government, the same critics argue, then prepared the National Bolivarian Armed Forces of Venezuela and colectivos to participate in intimidation tactics to prevent dissent.

=== Demonstrations ===
After the election results were announced, car horns blared and fireworks were lit by chavistas as celebrations took place in downtown Caracas.

In contrast, opposition supporters protested by banging pots and pans in the streets. After Capriles' call for the electoral commission not to officially proclaim Maduro the winner, National Guard troops and students clashed in Altamira Square. The troops used tear gas and plastic bullets to disperse the students who were protesting the official results, while the students hurled chunks of concrete and stones back at the troops on a highway in Caracas.

Venezuelan authorities greatly repressed demonstrations throughout the country, with President Maduro justifying the use of force by stating that he was facing a coup. At least seven deaths, 61 injuries and hundreds of arrests were reported following the protests. Attorney-General Luisa Ortega Diaz said that the violence included the burning of several medical clinics, offices of the national telephone company, grocery stores and other businesses. Following the crackdown by the Bolivarian National Guard, the government then congratulated guardsmen for its actions against demonstrators.

=== National Assembly brawls ===
Opposition legislators refused to recognize Nicolás Maduro as the elected president. On 15 April 2013, President of the National Assembly Diosdado Cabello announced that he would not allow opposition legislators to speak on the floor of the National Assembly until they recognize Nicolas Maduro as president. A fight broke out within the Assembly and two opposition lawmakers were injured, including William Davila, who had head injuries which resulted in sixteen stitches. Elvis Amoroso of the pro-Maduro PSUV applauded the injuries of opposition deputies stating "well done what they gave him".

Another brawl occurred on 30 April 2013. In response, opposition legislators lifted a Golpe al Parlamento (Coup in the Parliament) banner because they were still prohibited from speaking. Violence later broke out, and opposition lawmakers were injured. Government cameras pointed at the ceiling during the brawl. Ten opposition deputies were injured including María Corina Machado, who sustained several fractures to the nose and Julio Borges, who suffered head injuries. PSUV deputy and Minister of Prisons Iris Varela stated about the opposition that "se merecían los coñazos" ("they deserved those (violent) strikes").

The Human Rights Foundation, condemned the assault, with HRF president Thor Halvorssen Mendoza claiming that "the PSUV approved of the attacks against opposition deputies at the National Assembly".

=== Audit demands ===
The electoral commission declared that the results of the election were "irreversible", after the planned post-election audit of a random selection of 54% of votes turned up no problems when comparing the electronic vote with the paper ballot totals. Capriles refused to concede defeat and raised accusations of fraud, demanding an audit of the remaining 46% of the votes. Reuters on 18 April said that "[Capriles] has so far publicly presented little in the way of smoking-gun evidence to show the vote was stolen, though his campaign alleges more than 3,000 irregularities from armed thugs in polling stations to mismatches on tally sheets." Following a telephone conversation between Capriles and Maduro, the latter publicly promised he would permit an additional audit to be conducted on the 46% of votes not already audited. Maduro also claimed that Capriles proposed a "pact," which he rejected.

On 19 April, the CNE agreed to audit the remaining 46% of votes which had not already been audited. This was initially accepted by Capriles, who said he believed this second audit would vindicate his fraud claims. Capriles later rejected the audit, after his demands that the audit include the electoral registry as well as the voting records themselves – with detailed examination of voters' signature and fingerprint records – was rejected by the CNE as "impossible". Capriles said that without an audit of the electoral registry, an audit of the votes was "a joke". The CNE's audit of the remaining 46% of votes is to be completed between 6 May and 4 June.

Capriles appealed to the Supreme Court on 2 May 2013; they denied the appeal on 7 August 2013.

== See also ==
- National Assembly of Venezuela fight
