= Richard Mardo =

Venezuelan politician (born 1970)

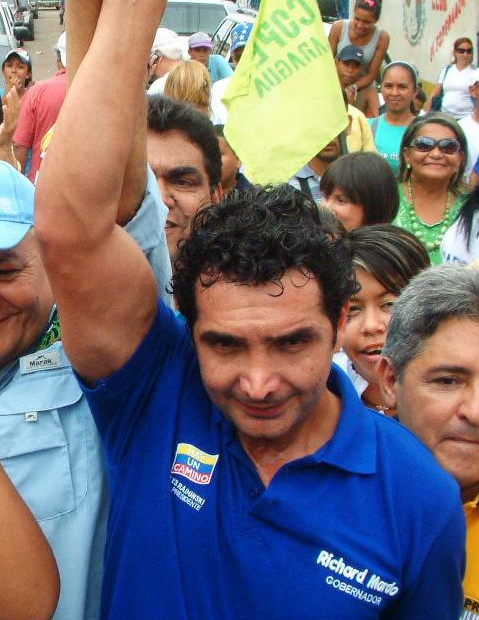
- Mardo in 2012.

Federal Deputy for Aragua
- In office 5 January 2011 – 5 January 2016

Personal details
- Born: 11 July 1970 (age 56) Maracay, Venezuela
- Party: Justice First
- Education: University of Carabobo

Richard Miguel Mardo Mardo (born 11 July 1970, Maracay) is a Venezuelan politician. He is the leader of the Justice First party in Aragua, as well as one of its deputy leaders, along with Carlos Ocariz. He was a member of the National Assembly of Venezuela from 2011 to 2016.

== Biography ==
He did his primary studies at the Republic of Mexico College, located in the center of Maracay. His studies were also at Juan Vicente Bolívar high school and Valentín Espinal high school. Finally, he graduated from high school at Agustín Codazzi high school. He entered the University of Carabobo, La Morita, where he obtained a bachelor's degree in Commercial Administration in 2000. He began his working life at a very young age as a peddler on Pérez Almarza boulevard and then dedicated himself to the textile area.

=== Political career ===
In 2000, he joined Justice First. He is one of the founding members of the party in Aragua. Within the party, he held the position of secretary of Regional Civil Justice, then became secretary of Regional Organization. Subsequently, in 2005, he was appointed general coordinator of the state of Aragua, a position for which he was re-elected in February 2007, with ample support from party bases. He is also the National Assistant Secretary General of the National Board of Justice First.

==== Candidacy for Mayor of Girardot ====
In the regional elections of 2008, Mardo was the candidate to the mayoralty of Girardot in Aragua, in which he lost in a very close vote by 151 votes against the PSUV candidate Pedro Bastidas.

==== Deputy to the National Assembly ====
In 2010 a campaign called "Es Tiempo de Cambiar" was launched, which ended with the launching of his candidacy by Primero Justicia in the city of Maracay on 30 January 2010, and months later it was supported by the rest of the political parties that formed the Democratic Unity Roundtable. He was elected deputy of circuit one of Aragua with 152,722 votes (27.73%). On 5 February 2013, Diosdado Cabello, president of the National Assembly of Venezuela, accused Mardo of corruption.

Within the National Assembly, he was a part of the Permanent Commission of Culture and Recreation in 2011.

==== Candidacy to the governorship of Aragua ====
===== Primary elections, 2012 =====
Mardo was a candidate in Aragua to contend for the opposition candidacy to the state's governorship, earning 163,959 votes, which represented 88% of the votes cast on 12 February 2012.

===== Regional elections, 2012 =====
In the 2012 Venezuelan regional elections, Mardo lost the gubernatorial election of Aragua against the PSUV candidate, Tareck El Aissami, by 11.39%.
