= Pedro Bastidas =

Venezuelan politician (1976–2021)

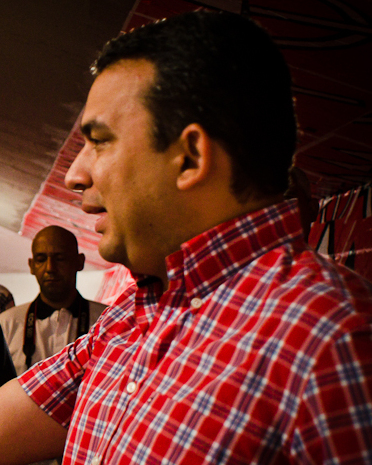

Mayor of Girardot Municipality
- In office 1 December 2008 – 19 April 2021
- Preceded by: Humberto Prieto

Member of the Consejo Legislativo del estado Aragua
- In office 2004–2008

Personal details
- Born: 17 January 1976; Maracay, Republic of Venezuela
- Died: 19 April 2021 (aged 45)
- Political party: PSUV

Pedro Bastidas (17 January 1976 – 19 April 2021) was a Venezuelan politician. A member of the United Socialist Party of Venezuela, he served as Mayor of the Girardot Municipality from 2008 to 2021 and was on the Consejo Legislativo del estado Aragua from 2004 to 2008. He also worked as an agricultural technician and held a degree in market research. He died of COVID-19 on 19 April 2021, at the age of 45.

== Career ==
In the 2008 Venezuelan regional elections, he was elected Mayor of the Girardot Municipality over Justice First candidate Richard Mardo by just 151 votes. He took office on 1 December 2008. In 2009, he created the state-owned enterprise "Fábrica de Sueños", which provided toys for poor children in the region. In 2010, he provided universal Wi-Fi to the municipality at eight different locations across Maracay. That same year, he founded Radio Girardot 96.1 FM, on which he hosted his personal radio show, Conversando y Construyendo con Pedro Bastidas. He also created a recording studio to feature local and national talent in Venezuela.

In 2011, Bastidas' office helped form the union Plástico-Productiva Socialista, which produced water tanks, traffic cones, garbage cans, and several other plastic products. As part of his policy for renewal and urban planning, he approved the construction of markets for informal traders in Maracay. He also helped ease traffic in areas of high congestion with squares, walkways, and courtyards. An asphalt plant was also created in Girardot, built to ease the difficulty of obtaining asphalt through the private sector. The Girardot Municipality's Mayoral Office has overseen the plant since December 2013.

In the 2013 elections, Bastidas was re-elected as Mayor of Girardot Municipality with 51.53% of the votes, aided by support from the Great Patriotic Pole. He was sworn in on 13 December 2013. In his second term, he was heavily focused on urban development and planning.
