= Republican Bicentennial Vanguard =

Political party in Venezuela

Republican Bicentennial Vanguard Vanguardia Bicentenaria Republicana
- Founded: October 27, 2007; 19 years ago
- Ideology: Anti-imperialism; Bolivarianism; Chavismo; Democratic socialism
- Political position: Left-wing
- National affiliation: Great Patriotic Pole
- Seats in the National Assembly: 0 / 277
- Seats in the Latin American Parliament: 0 / 12
- Governors: 0 / 23
- Mayors: 4 / 335

The Republican Bicentennial Vanguard (Spanish: Vanguardia Bicentenaria Republicana) is a Venezuelan socialist political party that supports the governing coalition Great Patriotic Pole. Two of the party's candidates were elected to the National Assembly in the 2015.

== Electoral performance ==
National Assembly Elections
Election year	Result	+/-
2015	2 / 167	▲

Elected representatives in the National Assembly
Elected representative	Representing state
Sandra Matilde D'Amelia Garrido	Falcon
Ana Salas	Lara
