= Ecological Movement of Venezuela =

Political party in Venezuela

Ecological Movement of Venezuela Movimiento Ecológico de Venezuela
- Leader: Alejandro Aguilera
- Founded: 2005
- Headquarters: Valencia, Venezuela
- Ideology: Green politics
- Political position: Centre
- National affiliation: Agreement for Change
- International affiliation: Global Greens, Federation of the Green Parties of the Americas
- Colours: Green
- Seats in the National Assembly: 0 / 277

Website
- Official site

Ecological Movement of Venezuela (Spanish: Movimiento Ecológico de Venezuela, MOVEV) is a green political party in Venezuela.

== History ==
The Ecological Movement of Venezuela is the first Venezuelan political green party and the first officially affiliated to the Global Greens network. The party first started as a social activist movement on the year 2005, where it grew to become a recognized political entity by the National Electoral Council, in February 2010.

They define as an organization of environmentalist citizens who compromise themselves to the protection of the environment and "...which political actions orient themselves to the promotion of a sustainable development that allows the Venezuelans to live in a just society, free and in harmony with nature". Among their activities are presentations, forums and workshops related to proper garbage management and disposal and prevention of the environment's decay. The party itself has a set of values they support including, among other, those of ecology, democracy, social justice, pacifism and knowledge.

On August 1, 2008, during a presentation on the CNE the party announced their official birth as a national political party and affiliation to the Federation of the Green Parties of the Americas.

On August 10, 2008, the party presented a public case on the CNE where they announced their support to various candidates for the 2008 Venezuelan regional elections. Pedro Bastidas, a former MVR militant, joined MOVEV becoming the first and so far only deputy of the party to be elected for the National Assembly, on the 2006–2011 term.

== See also ==
- List of political parties in Venezuela
- Interventions of political parties in Venezuela
