= Henry Rangel Silva =

Venezuelan politician and general

Minister of Defense
- In office January 2012 – October 2012
- President: Hugo Chavez
- Preceded by: Carlos José Mata Figueroa
- Succeeded by: Diego Alfredo Molero Bellavia

Governor of Trujillo
- In office 2012–2021
- Preceded by: Hugo Cabezas
- Succeeded by: Gerardo Márquez

Personal details
- Born: 1961 (age 64–65) Trujillo, Venezuela
- Party: United Socialist Party of Venezuela (PSUV)

Henry de Jesús Rangel Silva (born 1961) was the governor of Trujillo, Venezuela in 2012-2021. A military general and former Minister of Defense, Rangel Silva was previously the head of Operational Strategic Command of the Venezuelan Armed Forces, head of the DISIP (from 2005) and Director of CANTV (from 2009). Rangel Silva took part in the coup attempt of February 1992 together with Hugo Chávez.

== Career ==
In 2008, the U.S. Office of Foreign Assets Control (OFAC) sanctioned three current or former Venezuelan government officials, saying there was evidence they had materially helped the Revolutionary Armed Forces of Colombia (FARC) in the illegal drug trade. The order "freezes any assets the designated entities and individuals may have under U.S. jurisdiction and prohibits U.S. persons from conducting financial or commercial transactions involving those assets". Rangel, Hugo Carvajal, former director of Venezuela's military intelligence (DGIM); and Ramón Rodríguez Chacín, former Minister of the Interior, were sanctioned.

In November 2010, Rangel declared that the military forces are "married to the political, socialist project" led by Hugo Chávez in Venezuela. Then he added that the arrival of a government different from Chávez would be unacceptable:

"The hypothesis (of an opposition government) is difficult, it would mean to sell of the country, people won't accept that, the Armed Forces won't and the people less."

Shortly after, Rangel was promoted to General-in-Chief, the highest rank obtainable in the Venezuelan military.

In October 2012, Rangel Silva was chosen as the PSUV's candidate in Trujillo state after the then-current governor, Hugo Cabezas, announced he would not seek re-election. In December, he was elected governor of Trujillo state by 82.30% of the vote, in Venezuela's regional elections of 2012. He was re-elected in the 2017 regional elections by 59.75% of the vote. He lost PSUV primaries for 2021 regional elections.
