= Authentic Renewal Organization =

Political party in Venezuela

Authentic Renewal Organization Organización Renovadora Auténtica
- Founded: 1988
- Headquarters: Caracas
- Ideology: Christian democracy
- National affiliation: Great Patriotic Pole

Website
- oraporvenezuela.org

The Authentic Renewal Organization (ORA) is an Evangelical and Pentecostal political party in Venezuela, originally founded in 1988 by Godofredo Marín and Carlos Mendez.

The ORA does not align itself with any specific political ideology, but believes itself to be a form of government under the "sacred and noble Christian principles of love, peace, faith, and hope".

== History ==
In its first electoral participation, the party nominated one of its founders, Godofredo Ramón Marín, as a candidate for the general elections of 1988. The electoral promise of the party was based on "governing Venezuela for five years according to the Evangelical Bible," but with only 0.87% of the votes, the party and the candidate did not obtain the results they had expected. Despite their poor performance in the elections, the organization obtained two seats in the Chamber of Deputies of the Congress of the Republic. The deputies elected at that time were Mr. Gabriel Niño Laguado, representative of the Zulia State, and Dr. Modesto Rivero, for the Federal District (Capital District). In 1993, ORA obtained a position in the Federal District in the Chamber of Deputies.

In 1997, the party was thrown into conflict when one sector decided to support the candidacy of Claudio Fermín for the presidency of the Republic. The other group, led by the party's president Godofredo Marín, resolved to support the candidate of the Democratic Action party Luis Alfaro Ucero. The ORA withdrew its support for Luis Alfaro Ucero. This resulted in him obtaining only 0.38% of the votes, of which ORA contributed 0.11%. That fact caused a fracture in the party, making its options difficult for the general elections of 2000. The party did not run a presidential candidate nor obtain seats in the then newly installed National Assembly.

ORA last participation in Venezuelan national politics in 1998. After this, the political party was removed by the National Electoral Council for not having nominated new candidates. This removal led to the extinction of the ORA as a political party.

== Revival of ORA ==
In 2010, political leader Luis Reyes Castillo, the former general secretary of the YOUNG political party, established ORA not as a political party, but as a "Christian, social and political movement". Within two years, the ORA fulfilled the requirements of the National Electoral Council, and was registered as a political organization. In 2012, Luis Reyes Castillo launched his candidacy for the presidency of the Republic. Through this party he received 8,212 votes, which represented 0.05% of registered voters. Former political leader Juan Gonzalez, one of the founders of the original party in 1987, accused Rayes Castillo of kidnapping the political organization and its acronyms. According to González, Reyes Castillo discovered that ORA lacked leadership and resigned the general secretariat of his then-party, the YOUNG political movement, to reorganize the ORA party, without consulting its founders. In the elections of April 14, 2013, after the death of President Hugo Chávez, the party supported the candidate and active president Nicolás Maduro. This support is still maintained today, although the organization has submitted its candidates for the municipal elections in Venezuela, which were held on December 8, 2013.

== See also ==
- Political parties in Venezuela
- Evangelical political parties in Latin America
