= Great Patriotic Pole =

Left-wing Chavista political alliance in Venezuela

Simón Bolívar Great Patriotic Pole Gran Polo Patriótico Simón Bolívar
- Abbreviation: GPPSB; GPP
- Leader: Delcy Rodríguez
- Founder: Hugo Chávez
- Founded: 7 October 2011
- Ideology: Bolivarianism; Chavismo; Left-wing nationalism Left-wing populism Socialism of the 21st century Anti-imperialism; Anti-capitalism; Anti-Americanism; Communism; Marxism-Leninism
- Political position: Left-wing to far-left
- Colors: Orange, blue, red, yellow
- Seats in the National Assembly: 253 / 285
- Governors of States: 19 / 23
- Mercosur: 18 / 23
- Mayors: 306 / 337

Website
- granpolopatriotico.org.ve (archived)

The Simón Bolívar Great Patriotic Pole (Spanish: Gran Polo Patriótico Simón Bolívar, GPPSB), simply known as the Great Patriotic Pole (Spanish: Gran Polo Patriótico, GPP), is a left-wing, socialist, and Chavista electoral alliance and popular front of Venezuelan political parties created in 2012 to support the re-election of Hugo Chávez in the 2012 Venezuelan presidential election.

== Members ==
The GPP is composed of the following political parties:

Party	Spanish name	Leader	Ideology	National Assembly	Government
United Socialist Party of Venezuela	Partido Socialista Unido de Venezuela	Nicolás Maduro as President; Diosdado Cabello as Parliamentary Leader	Chavismo; Bolivarianism; Socialism of the 21st century	219 / 277	Majority
Fatherland for All (section)	Patria Para Todos	—N/a	Democratic socialism Libertarian Marxism	8 / 277	Majority
Tupamaro (section)	Tendencias Unificadas Para Alcanzar el Movimiento de Acción Revolucionaria Organizada	—N/a	Communism; Marxism–Leninism; Guevarism; Foco theory Revolutionary socialism	7 / 277	Majority
For Social Democracy	Por la Democracia Social	Didalco Bolívar	Social democracy	4 / 277	Majority
Republican Bicentennial Vanguard	Vanguardia Bicentenaria Republicana	—N/a	Bolivarianism	0 / 277	Majority
Venezuelan Popular Unity	Unidad Popular Venezolana	—N/a	Anti-imperialism	2 / 277	Majority
Alliance for Change	Alianza para el Cambio	Carlos Vargas	Social democracy	3 / 277	Majority
People's Electoral Movement	Movimiento Electoral del Pueblo	—N/a	Left-wing populism	3 / 277	Majority
Organized Socialist Party in Venezuela	Partido Socialista Organizado en Venezuela	Fernando Lisboa	Democratic socialism	0 / 277	Majority
Movement We Are Venezuela	Movimiento Somos Venezuela	Delcy Rodríguez	Left-wing nationalism	5 / 277	Majority
Networks Party	Partido Redes	Juan Barreto	Chavismo	0 / 277	Majority
Authentic Renewal Organization	Organización Renovadora –Auténtica	—N/a	Christian socialism	2 / 277	Majority
Venezuelan Revolutionary Currents	Corrientes Revolucionarias Venezolanas	Ramsés Colmenares (es)	Communism	0 / 277	Majority
Not members, but politically support the GPP
Revolutionary Middle Class	Clase Media Revolucionaria	Reinaldo Quijada	Chavismo	0 / 277	Not in government
Marxist–Leninist Communist Party of Venezuela	Partido Comunista Marxista-Leninista de Venezuela	—N/a	Communism; Marxism–Leninism; Hoxhaism; Anti-Revisionism	0 / 277	Not in government
Worker's Party	Partido de los Trabajadores	—N/a	—N/a	0 / 277	Not in government

== Election results ==
=== Parliamentary ===
National Assembly
Election year	No. of overall votes	% of overall vote	No. of overall seats won	+/–	Leader
2015	5,625,248 (2nd)	40.9	55 / 167	▲55	Diosdado Cabello
2020	4,317,819 (1st)	69.3	253 / 277	▲198	Diosdado Cabello
2025	5,024,475 (1st)	83.4	253 / 285	▲0	Jorge Rodríguez

=== Presidential ===
Election year	Name	Results	
Election year	Name	# of overall votes	% of overall vote
2012	Hugo Chávez	8,191,132	55.1 (1st)
2012	Member of "United Socialist Party of Venezuela" party in coalition. Winner		
2013	Nicolás Maduro	7,587,579	50.6 (1st)
2013	Member of "United Socialist Party of Venezuela" party in coalition. Winner		
2018 (disputed)	Nicolás Maduro	6,205,875	67.8 (1st)
2018 (disputed)	Member of "United Socialist Party of Venezuela" party in coalition. Winner		
2024 (disputed)	Nicolás Maduro	6,408,844	51.95 (1st)
2024 (disputed)	Member of "United Socialist Party of Venezuela" party in coalition. Winner		

=== Regional ===
Election year	No. of overall votes	% of overall vote	Governors
2012	4,853,494 (1st)	56.2	20 / 23
2017	5,814,903 (1st)	55.1	18 / 23
2021	3,595,490 (1st)	40.2	19 / 23

=== Municipal ===
Election year	No. of overall votes	% of overall vote
2013	5,216,522 (1st)	48.7
2017	6,517,506 (1st)	71.3
2018	~5,519,890 (1st)	97.3

== See also ==
- Democratic Unity Roundtable – the opposing electoral alliance
- Popular Revolutionary Alternative – a breakaway electoral alliance
- United Alliance Nicaragua Triumphs – the ruling alliance in Nicaragua

== Notes ==
^{a} Also includes some centre-left parties and one right-wing party, but is dominated by the left-wing other than on social policies such as abortion and LGBT rights.
