= List of political parties in Venezuela =

Historically, Venezuela had a two-party system, involving two major parties along with numerous other minor parties. That system imploded at the 1998 Venezuelan presidential election into a multi-party system. In the 2005 Venezuelan parliamentary election, the Fifth Republic Movement emerged as a dominant party. Its position was continued by the United Socialist Party of Venezuela (into which it merged on 20 October 2007), although it was not certain if this party system was going to remain stable through the following elections, due to the 2026 situation, some Chavistas have seen the new acting president, Delcy Rodriguez as too conciliatory to the United States' demands while others remain loyal to her administration, destabilizing the previously largely unified PSUV.

== List ==
=== Alliances ===
Alliance	Abbr.	Parties	Ideology	Deputies
Great Patriotic Pole; Gran Polo Patriótico	GPPSB	List of parties: United Socialist Party of Venezuela; Fatherland for All (factions); Tupamaro (factions); Movement We Are Venezuela; For Social Democracy; Alliance for Change; People's Electoral Movement; Authentic Renewal Organization; Venezuelan Popular Unity	Anti-imperialism; Bolivarianism; Chavismo	253 / 277
Popular Revolutionary Alternative; Alternativa Popular Revolucionaria	APR	List of parties: Communist Party of Venezuela; Fatherland for All (factions); Tupamaro (factions); Lucha de Clases; United Left; MBR-200; Revolutionary Party of Labour (PRT); Somos Lina Movement (SL); Compromiso País (COMPA); Red Autónoma de Comuneros (RAC)	Anti-imperialism; Bolivarianism; Chavismo	1 / 277
Unitary Platform; Plataforma Unitaria	UP	List of parties: Democratic Action (Note: Faction of the party, led by Henry Ramos Allup); Justice First; A New Era; Popular Will; Radical Cause; Movement for Venezuela; National Convergence; Citizen Encounter; Radical Cause; People's Electoral Movement (Note: Party faction. The party is controlled and intervened by an ad-hoc board, in line with the policies of Nicolas Maduro and the ideology of the Great Patriotic Pole); Red Flag (Note: Faction of the party, led by Gabriel Puerta Aponte); Ecological Movement of Venezuela (Note: Faction of the party, led by Gelyna Mercado Carabaño); Republican Movement; Democratic Republican Union; New Vision for my Country (Note: Party faction. The party is controlled by a board of directors that is not recognized by the party, but is recognized by the National Electoral Council); Gente Emergente; Project Venezuela; Clear Accounts	Anti-Chavism; Liberal democracy	12 / 277

=== Major parties ===
Party	Abbr.	Ideology	Deputies
United Socialist Party of Venezuela; Partido Socialista Unido de Venezuela	PSUV	Anti-imperialism; Anti-capitalism; Bolivarianism	222 / 277
Democratic Action; Acción Democrática	AD	Social democracy; Left-wing nationalism; Progressivism	8 / 277
Fatherland for All; Patria para Todos	PPT	Democratic socialism; Libertarian Marxism	8 / 277
Revolutionary Movement Tupamaro; Movimiento Revolucionario Tupamaro	MRT	Communism; Marxism–Leninism	7 / 277
Movement We Are Venezuela; Movimiento Somos Venezuela	MSV	Chavismo; Socialism	5 / 277
For Social Democracy; Por la Democracia Social	PODEMOS	Social democracy; Democratic socialism	5 / 277
Hope for Change; Esperanza por el Cambio	El Cambio	Christian democracy	4 / 277
Alliance for Change; Alianza para el Cambio	APC	Democratic socialism; Social democracy	3 / 277
People's Electoral Movement; Movimiento Electoral del Pueblo	MEP	Socialism; Left-wing nationalism	3 / 277
Copei	Copei	Christian democracy; Catholic social teaching	3 / 277
Venezuelan Popular Unity; Unidad Popular Venezolana	UPV	Bolivarianism; Communism	2 / 277
Progressive Advance; Avanzada Progresista	AP	Social democracy; Progressivism	2 / 277
Venezuela First; Primero Venezuela	PV	Humanism; Liberal democracy	2 / 277
Authentic Renewal Organization; Organización Renovadora Auténtica	ORA	Christian democracy; Social conservatism	1 / 277
Let's Change – Citizen's Movement; Cambiemos Movimiento Ciudadano	CMC	Pluralism; Progressivism; Feminism	1 / 277
Communist Party of Venezuela; Partido Comunista de Venezuela	PCV	Communism; Marxism–Leninism	1 / 277
Justice First; Primero Justicia	PJ	Radical centrism	0 / 277
A New Era; Un Nuevo Tiempo	UNT	Keynesianism	0 / 277
Popular Will; Voluntad Popular	VP	Big tent	0 / 277
The Radical Cause; La Causa Radical	LCR	Radicalism	0 / 277
Movement for Venezuela (es); Movimiento por Venezuela	MPV	Democratic socialism	0 / 277
Project Venezuela; Proyecto Venezuela	ProVen	Christian democracy	0 / 277
Clear Accounts (es); Cuentas Claras	CC	Progressivism	0 / 277
Fearless People's Alliance; Alianza Bravo Pueblo	ABP	Social democracy	0 / 277
Come Venezuela; Vente Venezuela	VV	Classical liberalism	0 / 277
Emergent People; Gente Emergente	GE	Christian humanism	0 / 277
Republican Bicentennial Vanguard; Vanguardia Bicentenaria Republicana	VBR	Bolivarianism	0 / 277
Green Party of Venezuela; Partido Verde de Venezuela	PVV	Environmentalism	0 / 277

=== Other parties ===
Parties with no representation in the National Assembly but recent electoral activity:

- Esperanza por El Cambio (EL CAMBIO)
- National Force (Fuerza Nacional)
- Authentic Renewing Organization (Organización Renovadora Autentica)
- Democratic Republican Union (Union Republicana Democrática)
- Democratic Unity (Unión Democrática)
- Ecological Movement of Venezuela (Movimiento Ecológico de Venezuela)
- Force of the People (Fuerza de la Gente)
- For Social Democracy (Por la Democracia Social)
- Free Electors (Electores Libres)
- Going Forward (Vamos Adelante)
- Independents for the National Community (Independientes por la Comunidad Nacional)
- Independent Electoral Political Organization Committee (Comité de Organización Política Electoral Independiente)
- Labour Power (Poder Laboral)
- Lapy
- Liberal Force (Fuerza Liberal)
- Movement for Socialism (Movimiento al Socialismo)
- Movement of the Conscience of the Country (Movimiento de Conciencia de País)
- National Convergence (Convergencia Nacional)
- National Integrity Unity Movement (Movimiento de Integridad Nacional)
- National Thought (Pensamiento Nacional)
- Networks of Responses of Community Changes (Redes de Respuestas de Cambios Comunitarios)
- New Revolutionary Way (Nuevo Camino Revolucionario)
- New Social Order (Nuevo Orden Social)
- Organized Youth of Venezuela (Juventud Organizada de Venezuela)
- Patriotic Community Unity (Unidad Patriótica Comunitaria)
- People's Electoral Movement (Movimiento Electoral del Pueblo)
- Popular Force (Fuerza Popular)
- Popular Vanguard (Vanguardia Popular)
- Red Flag Party (Partido Bandera Roja)
- Renovative Democracy Unity (Unidad Democracia Renovadora)
- Revolutionary Middle Class (Clase Media Revolucionaria)
- Revolutionary Party of Work (Partido Revolucionario del Trabajo)
- Socialism and Liberty Party (Partido Socialismo y Libertad)
- Solidarity (Solidaridad)
- Solution (Solución)
- The Force Of Change (La Fuerza del Cambio)
- Revolutionary Movement Tupamaro (Tendencias Unificadas para Alcanzar el Movimiento de Acción Revolución)
- United for Peace and Democracy Democratic Party (Partido Demócrata Unidos por la Paz y la Democracia)
- United for Venezuela (Unidos para Venezuela)
- United People Liberal Movement (Movimiento Liberal Pueblo Unido)
- Venezuela First-class (Venezuela de Primera)
- Venezuela Vision Unity (Unidad Visión Venezuela)
- Venezuelan Popular Unity (Unidad Popular Venezolana)
- Venezuelan Revolutionary Currents (Corrientes Revolucionarias Venezolanas)
- Republican Movement (Movimiento Republicano)
- We Organized Choose Unity (Unidad Nosotros Organizados Elegimos)
- Pencil Alliance (Alianza del Lápiz)

=== Regional parties ===
Major regional parties:

- Alternative Response Independent Movement (Movimiento Independiente Respuesta Alternativa)
- Amazonas's New Route (Nuevo Rumbo de Amazonas)
- Autonomous Indigenous Movement of Zulia (Movimiento Indígena Autónomo del Zulia)
- Carabobo Proyect (Proyecto Carabobo)
- Efficient Revolution (Revolución Eficiente)
- FIOOP
- Independent Social Alliance of Sucre (Alianza Social Independiente de Sucre)
- Independent Regional Emergent Movement (Movimiento Emergente Regional Independiente)
- National Council of Venezuelan Indians (Consejo Nacional Indio de Venezuela)
- Vargas's First (Vargas de Primera)
- Regional Advance Movement - MRA (Movimiento Regional de Avanzada)
- Republican Vanguard Force (Fuerza de Vanguardia Republicana)
- Revolutionary Social Alliance Party (Partido de Alianza Social Revolucionaria)
- United Multiethnic Peoples of the Amazonas (Pueblos Unidos Multiétnicos de Amazonas)
- United Movement of Indigenous People (Movimiento Unido de Pueblos Indígenas)
- What's Been Achieved by Yaracuy (Lo Alcanzado por Yaracuy)
- Cojedes Go Go (Vamos Vamos Cojedes)

=== Defunct parties ===
Parties with no legal status and parties with no recent electoral activity:

- Advanced Answer Independent Electoral Party (Partido Indepeniente Electoral De Repuesta Avanzada)
- Araguaney Electoral Movement (Araguaney Movimiento Electoral)
- Builders of a Country (Constructores de un Pais)
- Civil Resistance (Resistencia Civil)
- Community Change Answer (Respuesta de Cambio Comunitario)
- Democratic Active National Organization (Organizacion Nacional Democratica Activa)
- Democratic Image (Imagen Democratica)
- Farming Action (Accion Agropecuaria)
- For Love of the City (Por Querer a la Ciudad)
- For the Love of Venezuela (Por Querer a Venezuela)
- IFP
- Independent National Organization (Organización Nacional Independiente)
- Independents for Venezuela (Independientes Por Venezuela)
- Independents With Vision Of The Future (Independiente Con Vision De Futuro)
- Internationalism (Internacionalismo)
- Movement for a Responsible, Sustainable and Entrepreneurial Venezuela (Movimiento por una Venezuela Responsable, Sostenible y Emprendedora)
- Lets Break Chains (Rompamos Cadenas)
- National Encounter (Encuentro Nacional)
- National Feeling Movement (Movimiento Sentir Nacional)
- National Independent Movement (Movimiento Nacional Independiente)
- New Order (Nuevo Orden)
- National Socialist Liberation Group Pro Venezuela (Grupo Nacional Socialista de Liberacion Pro-Venezuela)
- New People Concentration Movement (Movimiento de Concentracion Gente Nueva)
- Opening (Apertura)
- Party of the Venezuelan Revolution (Partido de la Revolución Venezolana)
- Pirate Party of Venezuela (Partido Pirata de Venezuela)
- Popular Alliance (Alianza Popular)
- Popular Independent Party (Partido Popular Independiente)
- Rebirth (Renace)
- Sons of the Homeland (Hijos de la Patria)
- Venezuela's Flame (La Llama de Venezuela)
- VTM
- We Are All Venezuela (Venezuela Somos Todos)

=== Historical parties ===
- Great Liberal Party of Venezuela (Gran Partido Liberal de Venezuela) (1840-1899)
- Venezuelan Democratic Party (Partido Democrático Venezolano) (1943-1945)
- National Democratic Party (Partido Democrático Nacional)
- Progressive Republican Party (Partido Republicano Progresista) (1936)
- Venezuelan Revolutionary Party (Partido Revolucionario Venezolano) (1926-1931)
- Revolutionary Left Movement (Movimiento de Izquierda Revolucionaria) (1960-1988)
- Merged into United Socialist Party of Venezuela:
  - Fifth Republic Movement (Movimiento V República) (1997-2007)
  - Venezuelan People's Union (Unión Popular Venezolana)
  - Socialist League (Liga Socialista) (1973-2007)
  - Movement for Direct Democracy (Movimiento por la Democracia Directa)
  - Union Party (Partido Unión)
  - Militant Civic Movement (Movimiento Civico Militante)
  - Action Force of Base Coordination (Fuerzas de Acciones de Coordinación de Base)
- Merged into Fearless People's Alliance:
  - Emergent Vision (Vision Emergente)
- Merged into Alternative Popular Directory:
  - Laborist Movement (Movimiento Laborista)
  - Independent Solidarity (Solidaridad Independiente)
- Merged into A New Era:
  - Only One People (Un Solo Pueblo)
  - Democratic Left (Izquierda Democratica)
  - Democratic Pole (Polo Democratico)

== See also ==
- Politics of Venezuela
- List of political parties by country
- Liberalism in Venezuela
- Interventions of political parties in Venezuela
