= 2010 Venezuelan parliamentary election =

- 26 September 2010
- All 165 seats in the National Assembly; 83 seats needed for a majority
- Turnout: 66.42% (▲41.16pp)
Party	Leader	Vote %	Seats	+/–
PSUV	Diosdado Cabello	48.13	98	−66
MUD	Ramón Guillermo Aveledo	47.22	65	New
PPT	José Albornoz	3.14	2	+1
This lists parties that won seats. See the complete results below.
Results by constituency and party-list vote by state.
President of the NA before	President of the NA
Cilia Flores; PSUV	Fernando Soto Rojas; PSUV

The 2010 parliamentary election in Venezuela took place on 26 September 2010 to elect the 165 deputies to the National Assembly. Venezuelan opposition parties, which had boycotted the previous election thus allowing the governing Fifth Republic Movement (MVR) to gain a two-thirds super majority, participated in the election through the Coalition for Democratic Unity (MUD). In 2007 the Fifth Republic Movement dissolved and the United Socialist Party of Venezuela was formed as the leading government party. Nationally, the popular vote was split equally between PSUV and MUD, but PSUV won a majority of the first-past-the-post seats and consequently retained a substantial majority in the Assembly, although falling short of both two-thirds and three-fifths super majority marks.

Of the 165 deputies, 110 were constituency representatives elected on a first-past-the-post, the system in 87 electoral districts, 52 elected on a party list system (two or three deputies per state of Venezuela, depending on population), and 3 seats were reserved for indigenous peoples, with separate rules.

Additionally, 12 representatives were chosen for the Latin American Parliament.

There was initially a dispute between alliances that participated in the election as to which alliance received a plurality of votes. Each coalition was allowed to invite 30 foreign officials to observe the elections.

== Background ==
=== Electoral changes ===
Elections for the National Assembly of Venezuela in the 2000 and the 2005 were conducted under a weak mixed member proportional system, with 60% elected in first-past-the-post electoral districts and the remainder by closed party list proportional representation. This was an adaptation of the system previously used for the Venezuelan Chamber of Deputies, which had been introduced in 1993, with a 50-50 balance between voting districts and party lists, and deputies per state proportional to population, but with a minimum of three deputies per state.

For the 2010 election, the Ley Orgánica de Procesos Electorales (LOPE) (Basic law of electoral process) among other changes reduced the party list proportion to 30%. In addition, the law completely separated the district vote and the party list votes, creating a more parallel system. Previously, parties winning nominal district seats had had these subtracted from the total won under the proportional party list. Under the new law, in 2009, electoral districts were redefined in a way that has been accused of favouring the PSUV, particularly in giving more weight to votes in the countryside over those in the city.

=== Electoral process ===
As usual in Venezuela, the voting took place on a non-work day, and the sale of alcohol was banned starting the day prior to elections.

Four domestic NGOs registered 624 observers each. Unlike the election in 2005, major independent election observing organisations such as the Organization of American States, the European Union and the Carter Center were not invited to observe this election in a technical capacity. Guests from those bodies allowed to observe the final days of the election were not given the technical observation role they had been given in the past. Instead, each alliance participating in the election was permitted to bring "up to 30 witnesses from abroad." The European Union noted that "the Venezuelan National Electoral Council accredited more than 200 international guests to accompany the day of the election. No long-term international electoral observation missions participated." Foreign observers were warned in a full-page newspaper advertisement "not to interfere with the nation's internal affairs." An opposition spokesman said that "If observers were allowed to watch the campaign, they would have seen the abuse of power and of public resources and public media." The government's Roy Chaderton said that foreign observers were present and that comments like this from the opposition were "part of the media terrorism they like to practice".

The CNE monitors political advertisements during campaigns, and reported that for a 3-day period at the end of August, opposition ads made up 60.3% of the airtime given to such ads, across the five main channels Venevisión, Televen, Globovisión, Tves and Venezolana de Televisión. Over half the total opposition ad time of around 80 minutes was on Globovisión. Media controlled by the government gave "blanket coverage to the PSUV's campaign and token, hostile interviews to opposition candidates".

In early September, one member of the five-person CNE, the pro-opposition councillor Vicente Díaz, publicly accused Chavez of breaking campaign laws by using state-run television to "berate rivals and praise friends" during the election campaign. Chavez denied breaking the law, and said that Diaz could be prosecuted for making false accusations. Díaz requested the CNE open administrative proceedings, but after extensive internal discussion the CNE declined. The opposition electoral coalition, Coalition for Democratic Unity (MUD) rejected the CNE decision, and said it illustrated CNE's lack of independence and willingness to justify violation of electoral rules.

== Campaign ==
Around 17.5 million of the country's 28.5 million population were eligible to vote.

=== PSUV ===
In order to revise the party's statutes, programme, and primary voting methods, the ruling United Socialist Party of Venezuela planned a congress of 772 members representing the country's 759 municipalities. These members were elected by the members of the party in an election held on 15 November 2009. At this congress, beginning on 21 November 2009 and ending in March 2010, members were to debate each weekend over the new standards of the party, in which are included voting and selection method for the upcoming parliamentary elections.

=== Opposition ===
The main Venezuelan opposition parties had boycotted the 2005 parliamentary election, unexpectedly withdrawing just before election day, despite a dispute over the voting process apparently having been resolved with the support of the Organization of American States (OAS). Eleven deputies subsequently defected to the opposition or declared themselves independent.

In June 2009, it was reported that the opposition parties were planning to create the Mesa de la Unidad Democrática (Coalition for Democratic Unity, MUD) a coalition that would include all of the opposition parties which might select unique candidates for the upcoming elections. A previous opposition umbrella group, the Coordinadora Democrática, had collapsed after the failure of the 2004 recall referendum.

By April 2010, the MUD included around 50 political parties, of which 16 were national in scope and the rest regional, and received support from some other social organisations and opinion groups. The main parties included in MUD are the traditional Democratic Action and COPEI (which held power from 1958 to 1998); the left groups Movement for Socialism, Radical Cause and Red Flag Party; and more recently established parties A New Era, Justice First and For Social Democracy ("PODEMOS"). In April the MUD held primaries in 15 electoral districts, with 361,000 voters participating, and selecting 22 candidates (the remaining 143 candidates were chosen "by consensus"). The candidates chosen included Maria Corina Machado (of Sumate) and Manuel Rosales, the opposition's candidate in the 2006 presidential election and now in exile in Peru (due to corruption charges, which he denies). In addition, a number of the nine police officials imprisoned for participating in the 2002 Venezuelan coup d'état attempt, regarded by the MUD as political prisoners, were also nominated, in districts with a real chance of opposition success; winning would require their release due to parliamentary immunity.

The MUD is supported by the Movimiento 2D opposition movement led by El Nacional editor and proprietor Miguel Henrique Otero.

=== Events ===
In mid-August 2010 El Nacional sparked an international outcry when its frontpage publication of a graphic archival photo of bodies in a morgue, to illustrate a story about rising crime rates, led the government to temporarily ban such publications. El Nacional editor and proprietor Miguel Henrique Otero, leader of the opposition movement Movimiento 2D, said that "The editorial reasoning behind the photo was to create a shock so that people could in some way react to a situation that the government has done absolutely nothing about." The incident brought further international attention to the issue of Venezuela's crime rates (having already received widespread attention as a leading issue of public concern), and was followed by an article in The New York Times, reporting Venezuela's murder rate was higher than that of Iraq, although the comparison used Iraq Body Count's numbers derived from media reports rather than the World Health Organization's survey-based estimates, which are three times higher. A September 2010 poll conducted by Alfredo Keller & Associates confirmed that crime was the top concern for Venezuelans heading into the September 26 parliamentary elections, as it had been for some time.

At the end of August the death of Franklin Brito due to a hunger strike led to widespread domestic and international media coverage. He had, since 2004, launched a series of unsuccessful legal challenges and dramatic public protests (including a series of hunger strikes) against an alleged government confiscation of part of his farm. The government maintained that his protests were related to land legally owned by his neighbours, and that his final hunger strike came after the disputed land titles had been withdrawn from his neighbours. The government accused the Venezuelan opposition of acting like "vultures" and desiring Brito's death for their own political ends in the context of the coming election.

== Opinion polls ==
Poll results are listed in the tables below in chronological order and using the date the results of the survey were published. The highest percentage figure in each polling survey is displayed in bold, and the background shaded in the leading party's colour.

Poll company	Source	Publication date	PSUV	MUD	Undecided
GIS XXI	Radio Nacional de Venezuela	March 2010	32%	22%	**36%**
GIS XXI	Radio Nacional de Venezuela	May 2010	**36%**	23%	33%
GIS XXI	Radio Nacional de Venezuela	June 2010	**44%**	20%	–
Hinterlaces	Hinterlaces El Universal	July 2010	27%	**28%**	23%
GIS XXI	Correo del Orinoco	August 2010	**50%**	44%	–
IVAD	El Universal	August 2010	**45%**	43%	–
Keller & Asociados	El Universal	August 2010	32%	**46%**	–
Keller & Asociados	El Universal	2 September 2010	43%	**57%**	–
Datanálisis	ABC.es	September 2010	**52%**	48%	–
Hinterlaces	Unión Radio Descifrado	September 2010	**41%**	37%	–
IVAD	Unión Radio Descifrado	September 2010	**54%**	46%	–

Opinion polls vary widely, but the government-aligned GIS XXI (directed by former Chavez interior minister Jesse Chacón) consistently gives poll predictions more favourable to PSUV than other pollsters. GIS XXI's predictions for the February 2009 constitutional referendum just before polling day tallied closely with those of the independent Instituto Venezolano de Análisis de Datos (IVAD), and both closely matched the outcome (a nearly 10 percent margin of victory for approval); opposition-linked companies were predicting heavy defeat as late as December 2008.

In August 2010, the newspaper Últimas Noticias published what it said was the result of an unpublished opinion poll by Datanálisis, which showed the PSUV was likely to win 124 of the National Assembly's 165 seats, which would give it a two-thirds majority. Datanálisis later clarified that the results were a February 2010 extrapolation of the results of the last national election, the 2009 constitutional referendum.

== Results ==
=== National Assembly ===
Complete results were available on 28 September, showing a turnout of 66.45%. Out of 165 seats, the PSUV won 96, the MUD 64, the PPT 2, and three others were reserved for indigenous parties.

The election saw the PSUV retain 58.18% of the Assembly seats. It thus lost its two-thirds majority in the assembly, and therefore would not be able to pass organic legislation on its own, without the support of at least some members of the MUD opposition. The PSUV also did not attain a three-fifths majority, which means it would not be able to pass enabling legislation without the aid of 3 non-PSUV members of the National Assembly.

The three seats reserved for indigenous peoples were elected from the Foundation for Integration and Dignification, the Autonomous Movement of Zulia and from CONIVE.

Party	Party-list			Constituency			Total seats
Party	Votes	%	Seats	Votes	%	Seats	Total seats
United Socialist Party of Venezuela	5,113,121	45.21	25	7,521,277	45.77	71	96
A New Era	998,606	8.83	2	1,143,317	6.96	10	12
Justice First	974,358	8.62	5	1,562,962	9.51	10	15
Democratic Action	924,339	8.17	14	1,321,830	8.04	8	22
Copei	580,458	5.13	1	723,579	4.40	5	6
Fatherland for All	340,566	3.01	1	677,472	4.12	1	2
Project Venezuela	339,853	3.01	2	572,753	3.49	1	3
For Social Democracy	298,311	2.64	0	477,747	2.91	2	2
National Integrity Movement–Unity	204,163	1.81	0	314,564	1.91	0	0
Communist Party of Venezuela	162,919	1.44	0	193,804	1.18	0	0
Tupamaro	152,829	1.35	0	148,479	0.90	0	0
Radical Cause	103,367	0.91	1	203,740	1.24	1	2
Fearless People's Alliance	91,408	0.81	0	132,223	0.80	0	0
Clear Accounts	75,723	0.67	0	100,261	0.61	1	1
Red Flag Party	67,563	0.60	0	82,790	0.50	0	0
Republican Movement	62,152	0.55	0	68,002	0.41	0	0
Movement for Socialism	51,461	0.46	0	67,357	0.41	0	0
Convergence	47,132	0.42	1	46,762	0.28	0	1
Project Carabobo	44,126	0.39	0	66,917	0.41	0	0
United for Venezuela	41,741	0.37	0	62,645	0.38	0	0
National Opinion	34,779	0.31	0	42,633	0.26	0	0
Democratic Unity	33,537	0.30	0	54,876	0.33	0	0
Emerging People	33,222	0.29	0	60,749	0.37	0	0
Independent Solidarity	31,385	0.28	0	44,282	0.27	0	0
People's Electoral Movement	30,826	0.27	0	40,039	0.24	0	0
Democratic Republican Union	24,669	0.22	0	37,079	0.23	0	0
Venezuelan Popular Unity	20,916	0.18	0	24,900	0.15	0	0
People's Vanguard	20,374	0.18	0	28,624	0.17	0	0
Ecological Movement of Venezuela	17,399	0.15	0	23,776	0.14	0	0
Liberal Force	14,547	0.13	0	27,535	0.17	0	0
Allied Democrats of Free Expression	14,065	0.12	0	14,912	0.09	0	0
Only One People	13,914	0.12	0	16,063	0.10	0	0
Democracia Renovadora	12,395	0.11	0	18,626	0.11	0	0
Electores Libres	11,088	0.10	0	14,298	0.09	0	0
Gerencia Organización y Operatividad de Visión Avanzada	11,049	0.10	0	11,352	0.07	0	0
Frente Unido al Trabajo Social	10,862	0.10	0	21,923	0.13	0	0
Partido Auténtico Nacional	10,328	0.09	0	14,556	0.09	0	0
Confederación Democrática	10,030	0.09	0	14,212	0.09	0	0
Poder Laboral	9,065	0.08	0	12,036	0.07	0	0
Networks Party	9,048	0.08	0	12,713	0.08	0	0
Labour Movement	8,913	0.08	0	14,043	0.09	0	0
Unión Nacional Independiente de Organizaciones Sociales	8,723	0.08	0	8,425	0.05	0	0
Por un Mejor Vivir	8,536	0.08	0	15,098	0.09	0	0
Independents for National Community	8,079	0.07	0	7,508	0.05	0	0
Organized Socialist Party in Venezuela	7,895	0.07	0	12,065	0.07	0	0
Think Democracy	7,677	0.07	0	10,421	0.06	0	0
United Youth in National Action with Bimba	7,665	0.07	0	10,737	0.07	0	0
Nosotros Organizados Elegimos	7,541	0.07	0	12,107	0.07	0	0
Organisation Force in Motion	7,523	0.07	0	17,959	0.11	0	0
Venezuela de Primera	7,346	0.06	0	11,976	0.07	0	0
Voluntarios por la Democracia	7,213	0.06	0	14,176	0.09	0	0
Movimiento Bastión Revolucionario Doscientos Cuatro Fases	7,019	0.06	0	17,927	0.11	0	0
Movimiento Conciencia de País	6,472	0.06	0	10,674	0.06	0	0
Por Mi Pueblo	6,248	0.06	0	6,894	0.04	0	0
Alianza Social Independiente Sucre	6,127	0.05	0	7,984	0.05	0	0
Movimiento Alternativo Buscando Soluciones	5,886	0.05	0	15,623	0.10	0	0
Vision Venezuela	5,842	0.05	0	6,826	0.04	0	0
Voters of Bolivar	5,800	0.05	0	16,297	0.10	0	0
Fuerza Ciudadana	5,738	0.05	0	5,417	0.03	0	0
Justicia, Rectitud, Lealtad	5,733	0.05	0	6,524	0.04	0	0
Solidaridad	5,610	0.05	0	7,668	0.05	0	0
Plataforma de Encuentro Social	4,963	0.04	0	6,102	0.04	0	0
Actividad Vecinal	4,893	0.04	0	6,099	0.04	0	0
United for Human Rights	4,756	0.04	0	7,677	0.05	0	0
Nuevo Pacto	4,749	0.04	0	3,865	0.02	0	0
Unidos por Monagas	4,701	0.04	0	15,085	0.09	0	0
Nuevo Orden Social	4,528	0.04	0	5,631	0.03	0	0
Renovación Organizada Grupo Emergente	4,161	0.04	0	4,228	0.03	0	0
Movimiento Nacional la Base Decide	3,612	0.03	0	6,115	0.04	0	0
Dignidad Patriótica	3,029	0.03	0	5,128	0.03	0	0
Fuerza de la Gente	2,613	0.02	0	3,035	0.02	0	0
Dignidad Social Monaguense	2,540	0.02	0	3,965	0.02	0	0
Organizados para Gobernar Gente Nueva	2,492	0.02	0	2,845	0.02	0	0
Advanced Regional Movement	2,189	0.02	0	2,187	0.01	0	0
Consenso en la Zona	2,168	0.02	0	2,597	0.02	0	0
Revolutionary Socialist Party of Venezuela	2,067	0.02	0	3,430	0.02	0	0
Movimiento Vecinal Comunitario	1,816	0.02	0	4,291	0.03	0	0
Movimiento pro Defensa de la Comunidad	1,651	0.01	0	1,862	0.01	0	0
Pueblo en la Calle	1,583	0.01	0	1,186	0.01	0	0
Luz de Anzoategui	1,568	0.01	0	2,190	0.01	0	0
Movimiento Comunitario Voluntad Vecinal	1,507	0.01	0	2,271	0.01	0	0
Progreso Unidad para Anzoátegui	1,497	0.01	0	1,823	0.01	0	0
Movement 100	1,472	0.01	0	3,511	0.02	0	0
Movimiento de Inclusion sin Exclusion en Lara	1,418	0.01	0	3,387	0.02	0	0
Movimiento Popular	1,397	0.01	0	1,158	0.01	0	0
Voluntariado por Lara	1,357	0.01	0	3,301	0.02	0	0
Urgencia Solidaria de Transformacion Estadal Democratica	1,267	0.01	0	2,465	0.02	0	0
Caroni Decide	1,231	0.01	0	3,275	0.02	0	0
Carabobo Militancia Nacional	1,189	0.01	0	2,108	0.01	0	0
Movimiento Independiente por Maracaibo	1,163	0.01	0	1,132	0.01	0	0
Por Amor a los Pueblos	1,137	0.01	0	1,418	0.01	0	0
Comite de Bases Organizadas Independientes de Silva	1,102	0.01	0	1,316	0.01	0	0
Tiempo Social Nacionalista	1,076	0.01	0	1,315	0.01	0	0
Juventud Activa	1,075	0.01	0	129	0.00	0	0
Partido Democracia Nacional	1,037	0.01	0	850	0.01	0	0
Movimiento Independiente por El Zulia	1,034	0.01	0	1,041	0.01	0	0
Intercultural Pluriethnic Movement of Venezuela	1,002	0.01	0	852	0.01	0	0
Progreso en Marcha	999	0.01	0	1,171	0.01	0	0
Puro Limon	939	0.01	0	1,654	0.01	0	0
Alpha Project	926	0.01	0	1,501	0.01	0	0
Seguimos Hacia Carabobo	903	0.01	0	1,708	0.01	0	0
Somos Miranda	857	0.01	0	1,321	0.01	0	0
Pueblo Luchador	846	0.01	0	1,065	0.01	0	0
Dialogo	837	0.01	0	1,052	0.01	0	0
Movimiento Emergente Regional Independiente	834	0.01	0	742	0.00	0	0
Movimiento Ciudadano Unidos por la Democracia	832	0.01	0	2,107	0.01	0	0
Puerto Cabello Primero	823	0.01	0	929	0.01	0	0
Venezuela con Otra Vision	823	0.01	0	1,179	0.01	0	0
Movimiento Unido Electoral Varguense Tu Esperanza	809	0.01	0	1,640	0.01	0	0
Movimiento Popular Camino Nuevo	799	0.01	0	1,467	0.01	0	0
Venezuelan Independent Will Voters	796	0.01	0	912	0.01	0	0
Rumbo Seguro	761	0.01	0	637	0.00	0	0
Abriendo Brecha por Anzoategui	752	0.01	0	1,119	0.01	0	0
Worlers' Party	731	0.01	0	1,020	0.01	0	0
Organised Independent Party	702	0.01	0	478	0.00	0	0
Una Venezuela Activa Libre	695	0.01	0	1,259	0.01	0	0
Cambio Histórico Ético de Opinión	656	0.01	0	966	0.01	0	0
Nuestra Esperanza en Lara	656	0.01	0	1,706	0.01	0	0
Renovación en Democracia Nacimiento Alternativo	652	0.01	0	1,232	0.01	0	0
La Hora del Pueblo	647	0.01	0	296	0.00	0	0
Partido Popular por una Caracas de Primera	643	0.01	0	853	0.01	0	0
Consenso Histórico Electoral Independiente Que Educa	627	0.01	0	839	0.01	0	0
Movimiento Independiente Alcantarense	626	0.01	0	638	0.00	0	0
Alianza de Unidad Regional	615	0.01	0	1,485	0.01	0	0
Social Cause	606	0.01	0	849	0.01	0	0
Sociality Unity of the Left	580	0.01	0	729	0.00	0	0
Grupo Electoral Regional Amazonense Dispuestos a Vencer Unidos	566	0.01	0	747	0.00	0	0
Claridad Ciudadana	543	0.00	0	1,166	0.01	0	0
Revolucionario Independiente Organizado Social	532	0.00	0	596	0.00	0	0
Movement for Direct Democracy	524	0.00	0	391	0.00	0	0
Ciudadanos a la Reconstrucción Vamos	479	0.00	0	458	0.00	0	0
Venezuela Alternativa	464	0.00	0	740	0.00	0	0
Amigos por Venezuela	456	0.00	0	457	0.00	0	0
Alternativa Revolucionaria para Avanzar al Socialismo	429	0.00	0	778	0.00	0	0
Constructores de Guayana	407	0.00	0	993	0.01	0	0
Unión Patriótica Guariqueña	379	0.00	0	340	0.00	0	0
Movimiento Independiente Renovador-200	374	0.00	0	432	0.00	0	0
Movimiento Comunidades Organizadas	360	0.00	0	874	0.01	0	0
La Red del Pueblo	349	0.00	0	312	0.00	0	0
Fuerza Demócrata de Venezuela	332	0.00	0	346	0.00	0	0
Nueva Generación Insular	321	0.00	0	298	0.00	0	0
Movimiento Revolucionario Barineses por Venezuela	315	0.00	0	556	0.00	0	0
Por un Mariño Mejor	306	0.00	0	271	0.00	0	0
Sobre Ruedas por Cojedes	304	0.00	0	371	0.00	0	0
Everyone United for Amazonas	298	0.00	0	201	0.00	0	0
Alianza Eficaz	273	0.00	0	417	0.00	0	0
Unidad Patriotica Comunitaria	267	0.00	0	280	0.00	0	0
Sixth Republic	234	0.00	0	214	0.00	0	0
Socialismo en Marcha	216	0.00	0	373	0.00	0	0
Vamos Adelante	206	0.00	0	196	0.00	0	0
Movimiento Politico de Participacion Ciudadana	182	0.00	0	153	0.00	0	0
Guardianes de la Patria	170	0.00	0	189	0.00	0	0
Movimiento Progresista	153	0.00	0	210	0.00	0	0
Fuerza Brava	152	0.00	0	277	0.00	0	0
Nueva Revolucion	140	0.00	0	109	0.00	0	0
Por Vargas de Verdad	126	0.00	0	203	0.00	0	0
Nuevo Dia	119	0.00	0	115	0.00	0	0
Movimiento de Avanzada Regional Organizada en Amazonas	111	0.00	0	84	0.00	0	0
Amigos de Alianza Libertadora Independiente	107	0.00	0	77	0.00	0	0
Yacimiento Indigenista Venezolano Independiente	104	0.00	0	1,102	0.01	0	0
People of Vargas	100	0.00	0	175	0.00	0	0
Accion Regional Social Voluntaria	95	0.00	0	100	0.00	0	0
Vargas Solidaria	93	0.00	0	195	0.00	0	0
Movimiento de Concentracion Gente Nueva	71	0.00	0	58	0.00	0	0
Patria y Democracia	68	0.00	0	61	0.00	0	0
Grupo de Accion Radical Unidos por la Amistad	67	0.00	0	71	0.00	0	0
Rompamos Cadenas	61	0.00	0	124	0.00	0	0
Siempre Contigo Carabobo				2,039	0.01	0	0
Varias Tarjetas Válidas				1,521	0.01	0	0
Fuerza con Caticaracas				1,102	0.01	0	0
Dignidad Independiente en Accion				22	0.00	0	0
Independents				428	0.00	0	0
Indigenous representatives							3
Total	11,309,145	100.00	52	16,431,660	100.00	110	165
Valid votes	11,309,145	97.52		11,049,076	95.27		
Invalid/blank votes	287,094	2.48		548,916	4.73		
Total votes	11,596,239	100.00		11,597,992	100.00		
Registered voters/turnout	17,458,473	66.42		17,404,710	66.64		
Source: IFES, Jose Huerta, CNE

==== By state ====
State	Party list seats							Nominal seats									
State	Votes				Seats			PSUV	MUD								PPT
State	PSUV	MUD	PPT	Others	PSUV	MUD	PPT	PSUV	PODEMOS	MPJ	AD	Causa Я	CC	COPEI	UNT	PV	PPT
Amazonas	23,934	8,071	23,699	1,244	1		1										1
Anzoátegui	278,717	323,701	5,326	12,172	1	1			2	3	1						
Apure	97,966	59,197	2,623	2,069	1	1		3									
Aragua	354,638	328,165	5,990	16,567	1	1		4		2							
Barinas	172,643	129,244	2,743	1,736	1	1		4									
Bolivar	257,546	243,998	4,766	5,414	1	1		5				1					
Carabobo	390,834	484,390	6,724	23,096	1	2		5					1			1	
Cojedes	80,837	41,207	1,086	3,381	1	1		2									
Delta Amacuro	51,013	16,264	584	3,436	2			2									
Distrito Capital	484,103	484,844	11,313	33,862	1	2		6		1							
Falcón	189,769	167,674	3,562	1,976	1	1		3						1			
Guárico	164,281	82,372	32,407	2,852	1	1		3									
Lara	297,275	219,348	207,181	4,980	1	1		5			2						
Mérida	178,638	183,563	2,851	1,734	1	1		3			1						
Miranda	501,468	691,118	7,026	10,245	1	2		5		4							
Monagas	194,118	116,909	1,975	17,546	1	1		4									
Nueva Esparta	78,656	111,735	1,345	968	1	1					2						
Portuguesa	205,739	104,887	7,102	8,274	1	1		4									
Sucre	170,541	157,239	2,506	1,502	1	1		2			2						
Táchira	216,393	290,217	1,672	5,771	1	1		1						4			
Trujillo	175,116	98,538	2,809	2,861	1	1		3									
Vargas	84,241	66,553	1,291	1,574	1	1		2									
Yaracuy	131,982	97,725	11,129	1,063	1	1		3									
Zulia	670,974	827,350	6,967	4,414	1	2		2							10		
TOTAL	5,451,422; 48.20%	5,334,309; 47.17%	354,677; 3.14%	168,737; 1.49%	25	26	1	71	2	10	8	1	1	5	10	1	1
Three additional seats are reserved for indigenous peoples: these were won by the Fundación para la Capacitación e Integración y Dignificación, the Movimiento Indígena Autónomo del estado Zulia and the Consejo Nacional Indio de Venezuela (CONIVE).
Source: National Electoral Council

==== Elected representatives ====
Representative	Party	State	Votes
Bloque oficialista
César Sanguinetti	PSUV	Amazonas	List
Earle Herrera	PSUV	Anzoátegui	List
Cristóbal Jiménez	PSUV	Apure	List
Orlando Zambrano	PSUV	Apure-1	33 034
Juan García	PSUV	Apure-2	33 208
Jhonny Salguero	PSUV	Apure-3	30 473
María León	PSUV	Aragua	List
Rosa León	PSUV	Aragua-2	95 260
José Hernández	PSUV	Aragua-2	94 209
Carlos Escarrá†	PSUV	Aragua-3	66 555
Elvis Amoroso	PSUV	Aragua-4	75 540
Giovanny Peña	PSUV	Barinas	List
Jesús Graterol	PSUV	Barinas-1	115 632
Eduardo Lima	PSUV	Barinas-1	115 025
Zulay Martínez	PSUV	Barinas-2	59 544
Maigualida Santana	PSUV	Barinas-2	59 260
Victoria Mata	PSUV	Bolívar	List
Gil Barrios	PSUV	Bolívar-1	78 721
Tito Oviedo	PSUV	Bolívar-1	78 270
Richard Sosa	PSUV	Bolívar-2	134 057
Nancy Asencio	PSUV	Bolívar-2	133 916
Sol Velásquez	PSUV	Bolívar-2	133 434
Francisco Ameliach	PSUV	Carabobo	List
Miriam Pérez	PSUV	Carabobo-1	78 841
Héctor Argüero	PSUV	Carabobo-4	58 791
José Ávila	PSUV	Carabobo-5	149 977
Saúl Ortega	PSUV	Carabobo-5	149 812
Asdrúbal Colina	PSUV	Carabobo-5	149 753
Érika Farías	PSUV	Cojedes	List
Loidy Herrera	PSUV	Cojedes-1	36 763
Alejandro Villanueva	PSUV	Cojedes-2	41 455
Yelitza Santaella	PSUV	Delta Amacuro	List
Henry Hernández	PSUV	Delta Amacuro	List
Alfredo Rojas	PSUV	Delta Amacuro-1	26 535
Loa Tamaronis	PSUV	Delta Amacuro-2	20 804
Cilia Flores	PSUV	Distrito Capital	List
Aristóbulo Istúriz	PSUV	Distrito Capital-1	134 919
Freddy Bernal	PSUV	Distrito Capital-1	133 115
Robert Serra†	PSUV	Distrito Capital-2	71 339
Jesús Farías	PSUV	Distrito Capital-4	80 359
Darío Vivas	PSUV	Distrito Capital-5	138 531
Juan Carlos Alemán	PSUV	Distrito Capital-5	138 436
Fernando Soto	PSUV	Falcón	List
Andrés Eloy Méndez	PSUV	Falcón-1	39 417
Jesús Montilla	PSUV	Falcón-2	58 308
Henry Ventura	PSUV	Falcón-4	41 396
Jesús Cepeda	PSUV	Guárico-1	78 820
Roger Cordero	PSUV	Guárico-2	45 714
Alfredo Ureña	PSUV	Guárico-3	39 026
Luis Reyes Reyes	PSUV	Lara	List
Alexander Torrealba	PSUV	Lara-1	130 197
Francisco Martínez	PSUV	Lara-1	130 115
Isabel Lameda	PSUV	Lara-1	129 499
Alexander Dudamel	PSUV	Lara-2	115 658
Julio Chávez	PSUV	Lara-2	114 630
Diógenes Andrade	PSUV	Mérida	List
Alexis Ramírez	PSUV	Mérida-1	46 161
Ramón Lobo	PSUV	Mérida-2	43 177
Guido Ochoa	PSUV	Mérida-3	45 659
Héctor Navarro	PSUV	Miranda	List
Juan Soto	PSUV	Miranda-4	106 839
Marleny Contreras	PSUV	Miranda-4	106 737
Modesto Ruiz	PSUV	Miranda-5	52 592
Claudio Farías	PSUV	Miranda-6	95 629
Elio Serrano	PSUV	Miranda-7	54 980
Diosdado Cabello	PSUV	Monagas	List
María Aranguren	PSUV	Monagas-1	120 708
Orangel López	PSUV	Monagas-1	120 306
Nelson Rodríguez Parra	PSUV	Monagas-1	120 250
Jesús Domínguez	PSUV	Monagas-2	70 101
William Fariñas	PSUV	Nueva Esparta	List
Blanca Eekhout	PSUV	Portuguesa	List
Silvio Mora	PSUV	Portuguesa-1	65 241
Enzo Caballo Russo	PSUV	Portuguesa-2	43 371
Nelson Escobar	PSUV	Portuguesa-3	54 068
César González	PSUV	Portuguesa-4	42 714
Luis Acuña Cedeño	PSUV	Sucre	List
Erick Mago	PSUV	Sucre-1	54 432
Algencio Monasterio	PSUV	Sucre-2	38 088
Iris Varela	PSUV	Táchira	List
Ricardo Sanguino	PSUV	Táchira-3	40 854
Manuel Briceño	PSUV	Trujillo	List
Christian Zerpa	PSUV	Trujillo-1	61 582
José Morales	PSUV	Trujillo-2	66 633
Hugbel Roa	PSUV	Trujillo-3	47 119
Oswaldo Vera	PSUV	Vargas	List
Odalis Monzón	PSUV	Vargas-1	84 456
Gladys Requena	PSUV	Vargas-1	84 083
Braulio Álvarez	PSUV	Yaracuy	List
Néstor León Heredia	PSUV	Yaracuy-1	46 985
Yorman Aular	PSUV	Yaracuy-2	39 147
Carlos Gamarra	PSUV	Yaracuy-3	45 933
Francisco Arias Cárdenas	PSUV	Zulia	List
Jhony Bracho	PSUV	Zulia-2	38 021
Sergio Fuenmayor	PSUV	Zulia-3	65 588
Óscar Figueras	PCV	Guárico	List
José Luis González	CONIVE	Indígena-Oriente	852 689
Argelio Pérez	FUNDACIDI	Indígena-Sur	119 270
Bloque Mesa de la Unidad Democrática
Hiram Gaviria	UNT	Aragua-1	151 418
Stalin González	UNT	Distrito Capital	List
Carlos Ramos Rivas	UNT	Mérida-3	75 685
William Ojeda	UNT	Miranda	List
Alfonso Marquina	UNT	Miranda-1	112 595
Orlando Ávila	UNT	Nueva Esparta-1	46 700
Enrique Catalán	UNT	Trujillo	List
Omar Barboza	UNT	Zulia	List
Alfredo Osorio	UNT	Zulia	List
Juan Romero	UNT	Zulia-1	45 112
William Barrientos	UNT	Zulia-4	49 368
José Sánchez	UNT	Zulia-5	92 123
Enrique Márquez	UNT	Zulia-6	93 985
Elías Matta	UNT	Zulia-8	71 305
Julio Montoya	UNT	Zulia-9	88 797
Freddy Paz	UNT	Zulia-12	46 599
Antonio Barreto Sira	AD	Anzoátegui	List
Rodolfo Rodríguez	AD	Anzoátegui-1	90 441
Carlos Michelangeli	AD	Anzoátegui-3	94 565
Miriam de Montilla	AD	Apure	List
Dennis Fernández	AD	Cojedes	List
Elieser Sirit	AD	Falcón	List
Edgar Zambrano	AD	Lara-3	85 808
Williams Dávila	AD	Mérida	List
Juan Pablo García	AD	Monagas	List
Tobías Bolívar Parra	AD	Nueva Esparta	List
César Rincones	AD	Sucre	List
Leomagno Flores	AD	Táchira-1	54 321
Bernardo Guerra	AD	Vargas	List
Hernán Alemán	AD	Zulia-10	100 802
Jacinto Romero Luna	COPEI	Anzoátegui-2	55 335
José Gregorio Graterol	COPEI	Falcón-3	54 235
Eduardo Gómez Sigala	COPEI	Lara-3	88 706
Enrique Mendoza	COPEI	Miranda-2	234 272
Morel Rodríguez Rojas	COPEI	Nueva Esparta-2	64 049
Iván Colmenares	COPEI	Portuguesa	List
Homero Ruiz	COPEI	Táchira	List
Gabino Paz	COPEI	Táchira-2	44 056
Abelardo Díaz	COPEI	Táchira-4	44 056
Mervin Méndez	COPEI	Zulia-11	87 514
Richard Arteaga	PJ	Anzoátegui-3	93 117
Richard Mardo	PJ	Aragua-1	152 722
Dinhora Figuera	PJ	Distrito Capital	List
Julio Borges	PJ	Miranda	List
Juan Carlos Caldera	PJ	Miranda-3	122 847
Tomás Guanipa	PJ	Zulia-7	73 099
Jesús Paraqueima	PODEMOS	Anzoátegui-1	91 195
Ismael García	PODEMOS	Aragua	List
Hermes García	PODEMOS	Sucre-3	92 292
Carlos Berrizbeitia	PROVE	Carabobo	List
Deyaitza Aray	PROVE	Carabobo	List
Vestalia Sampedro	PROVE	Carabobo-2	64 671
Andrés Velásquez	LCR	Bolívar	List
Américo de Grazia	LCR	Bolívar-3	48 439
Alfredo Ramos	LCR	Lara	List
Richar Blanco	ABP	Distrito Capital-3	124 957
Biaggio Pirieli	Convergencia	Yaracuy	List
Marcos Figueroa	DALE	Anzoátegui-4	80 810
Julio César Reyes	GE	Barinas	List
Miguel Cocchiola	CC	Carabobo-3	164 494
Hernán Núñez	MVP	Sucre-3	94 457
José Manuel González	Indep	Guárico	List
María Corina Machado	Indep	Miranda-2	235 259
Miguel Ángel Rodríguez	Indep	Táchira-5	97 458
Arcadio Montiel	MIAZULIA	Indígena-Occidente	1 063 904
Partido Patria Para Todos
Nirma Guarulla	PPT	Amazonas	List
Julio Ygarza^{R}	PPT	Amazonas-1	23 453

=== Latin American Parliament ===
Party	Votes	%	Seats
PSUV–PCV–UPV	5,268,939	46.72	6
Democratic Unity Roundtable	5,077,043	45.02	5
Fatherland for All	317,888	2.82	0
National Opinion	288,899	2.56	0
Organized Socialist Party in Venezuela	101,889	0.90	0
MOVEV–Liberal Force–Solidaridad–Poder Laboral	85,836	0.76	0
People's Electoral Movement	45,118	0.40	0
Democratic Unity	22,387	0.20	0
UNIDOS–United Youth in National Action with Bimba	19,705	0.17	0
Actividad Vecinal	8,496	0.08	0
Movimiento Conciencia de País	6,124	0.05	0
Networks Party	5,552	0.05	0
Organized to Govern	5,037	0.04	0
Independents for National Community	4,806	0.04	0
Dignidad Patriotica	4,776	0.04	0
Think Democracy	4,660	0.04	0
Nuevo Orden Social	4,057	0.04	0
MOBARE 200-4F	3,749	0.03	0
Intercultural Pluriethnic Movement of Venezuela	2,802	0.02	0
Indigenous representative			1
Total	11,277,763	100.00	12
Valid votes	11,277,763	97.09	
Invalid/blank votes	337,827	2.91	
Total votes	11,615,590	100.00	
Registered voters/turnout	17,490,878	66.41	
Source: CNE

== Reaction ==
Chavez called the results a "solid victory."

The price on Venezuelan bonds increased on news of the election results, described by Bloomberg as "Chavez's worst setback at the ballot box since taking office in 1999".

=== Analysis ===
According to Reuters, "The new parliamentarians do not take their seats until January, so Chavez has a compliant Assembly for three months more to push through legislation."

After the election, the Spanish newspaper El País suggested that the PSUV and the MUD would have finished with 80 seats each had the elections been run under the previous system.
