= Alejandra Otero =

Venezuelan comedian

- Born: Alejandra Otero Ramia; 18 May 1983 (age 43)
- Education: Universidad Monteávila
- Occupation: Comedian
- Parent(s): Miguel Henrique Otero; Carmen Ramia
- Family: Paulina Parra (sister); Bernardo Parra (brother)

Alejandra Otero Ramia (born 18 May 1983) is a Venezuelan comedian and journalist. After working as a journalist in media such as Globovisión and El Nacional, Alejandra retired to dedicate herself to comedy, joining several comedy groups and performing stand-up comedy routines.

== Career ==
Alejandra graduated with a degree in social communication from Universidad Monteávila in Caracas, worked as a journalist for Globovisión and El Nacional, and studied a master's degree in international relations at The New School, New York City. Afterwards, Otero worked as an announcer for the program Echando carro, broadcast by the Caracas Athenaeum radio station, and in 2005 she joined Globovisión's talk show Aló ciudadano.

After being in the program for two years, Alejandra decided to retire to focus on comedy, joining several comedy groups, including Improvisto, and performing stand-up comedy routines. She has also been coordinator and teacher of the stand-up comedy diploma course, offered by the Escuela de Humor (School of Humor) and carried out in collaboration with the International Professional Updating Center (CIAP) of the Andrés Bello Catholic University.

Otero was preparing to start a tour with the stand-up routine ¿Cómo te explico? with her husband, Jorge Parra, when the COVID-19 pandemic started and she arrived in Venezuela. During the pandemic, she was part of the cast of Radio Cuarentena (Radio Quarantine), an initiative of Reuben Morales that has brought together Venezuelan comedians such as Emilio Lovera, Laureano Márquez, Claudio Nazoa, Napoleón Rivero. She also published a song with comedian Ricardo del Bufalo, Los enchufados contagiados. Otero premiered her stand-up Mejor que la original in 2021.

== Personal life ==
Alejandra is married to Jorge Parra, better known as Domingo Mondongo, an Argentine founder of Doctor Yaso and Improvisto. Together they started a podcast called Vamos pelo a pelo about life as a couple. They have had two children together: Paulina and Bernardo. She is the daughter of the also journalist and director of El Nacional, Miguel Henrique Otero. Her mother Carmen Ramia was the CEO of the Caracas International Theater Festival and the Miami World Theater Festival.
