= UPV =

UPV may refer to:

== Politics ==
- Unión Popular Venezolana, a Venezuelan political party.
- Republic of Upper Volta, former name of the African country currently known as Burkina Faso (obsolete UNDP country code)
- Ulster Protestant Volunteers

== Educational Institutions ==
- University of the Philippines Visayas (UPV or UP Visayas)
- The Polytechnic University of Valencia (UPV)
- The University of the Basque Country (UPV/EHU).
