= Movimiento 2D =

The Movimiento 2D (2D Movement, M2D or simply 2D) is a Venezuelan opposition movement led by El Nacional editor and proprietor Miguel Henrique Otero.

== History ==
2D, founded by Otero in late 2007 in the run-up to the 2007 Venezuelan constitutional referendum, includes a number of prominent Venezuelans besides Otero, including former foreign minister Simón Alberto Consalvi, who served under both Jaime Lusinchi and Carlos Andrés Pérez. The name of the movement refers to 2 December, being the date of the 2012 Venezuelan presidential election. In February 2010 M2D announced it would support the opposition electoral coalition Mesa de la Unidad Democrática in the September 2010 parliamentary election.

In a 2D press conference opposing the 2009 Venezuelan constitutional referendum, President Hugo Chávez was compared to Juan Vicente Gómez, the Venezuelan dictator of the 1920s and 1930s, and 2D's Pablo Medina said Venezuela would become a dictatorship if it was approved. The referendum to remove term limits from all public offices was approved.

In June 2010 2D criticised the government takeover of Banco Federal. In mid-August 2010, in the run-up to the parliamentary election, after El Nacional published in its frontpage publication an archival photo of bodies with gunshot wounds in a morgue, to illustrate a story about rising crime rates, the government banned the publications, sparking international outcry. Otero said that "The editorial reasoning behind the photo was to create a shock so that people could in some way react to a situation that the government has done absolutely nothing about."
