= Franklin Brito =

Venezuelan biologist and political activist (1960 - 2010)

Franklin José Brito Rodríguez (5 September 1960 – 30 August 2010) was a Venezuelan agricultural producer and biologist who gained national and international prominence over a land ownership dispute with the Venezuelan government's National Lands Institute INTI, which encouraged and allowed a neighboring farm owned by government supporters to invade and seize a large part of his land. He carried out a series of legal challenges and public protests from 2004, often coinciding with other protests such as the 2007 Venezuelan demonstrations. Brito's protests culminated in his death due to a hunger strike. Brito's death, which came in the highly charged pre-election atmosphere of the 2010 Venezuelan parliamentary election, led to widespread domestic and international media coverage.

== Initial claims ==
In 1999 the Instituto Agrario Nacional gave Brito a tax-free title to a 717-acre (290 ha) property he owned in La Tigrera, in Sucre, Bolivar State.

In 2002 Brito submitted a project to the Corporación Venezolana de Guayana (CVG) to combat a disease that was affecting the yam plantations in Sucre Municipality, Bolívar State. However, his proposal entered in conflict with another one adopted by Sucre's Mayor, Juan Carlos Figarella, a member of the political party, Fifth Republic Movement. Brito also alerted the CVG about the supposed existence of a risk of the misappropriation of the funds in case that Figarella's proposal was accepted. Finally, Sucre's Mayor project was rejected, but Brito lost his post in Sucre Mayoralty's Agricultural Institute shortly after. He was also fired from his job as a secondary school teacher, and his wife from her job as a teacher at another public school. In both cases, the Britos denounced that their longevity and severance benefits were not paid.

Since March 2003, Brito claimed that some land titles issued to neighbours overlapped with parts of his farm.

According to Brito, his dispute began when a 59-acre (240,000 m^{2}) part of his 716-acre (2.90 km^{2}) farm in Bolívar State was taken over by neighbours and that he later found out that the neighbours had been authorised by the INTI, a land reform agency of the Venezuelan government. Brito said that the takeover was orchestrated due to a grudge by Juan Carlos Figarella, whom he believed corrupt.

The Supreme Tribunal of Venezuela turned down Brito´s claim on formal grounds, in March 2007. However, it expressly ordered INTI to reestablish access to Brito´s land by rendering null and void those titles given by INTI to Brito's neighbours.

== Legal challenges and public protests ==
After Brito lost part of his farm, he carried out a range of public protests in order to raise public support for his cause, including a total of six hunger strikes. His first hunger strike took place on 24 November 2004. In 2005 Brito amputated his finger in front of television cameras after the court decided against him. In 2006 an appeal to a higher court was ruled inadmissible. A second hunger strike followed. In 2007 the Supreme Tribunal of Justice turned down his case. The government had a habit of reneging on its promises after he ended his hunger strikes. At one point Brito turned down almost all of a government settlement of $230,000 on the grounds that he believed it could be seen as illegal and potentially lead to his incarceration for corruption.

In July 2009 he began another protest in front of the Organisation of American States building in Venezuela, which lasted until December 2009, when INTI revoked the disputed land titles for humanitarian reasons due to Brito's continuing hunger strikes. However, Brito rejected this as not firmly legal, and began another protest in front of the OAS building, leading the OAS to offer mediation. In January 2010 the Venezuelan Attorney General applied to a court to have Brito moved to a hospital. Brito had been held in the hospital "against his will, virtually incommunicado." The government claimed that the hospitalisation was for his own protection.

== Death ==
Brito died, age 49, in the hospital on the evening of 30 August. His family said that Brito had become a "symbol and standard bearer for all those who have been stepped on by power and government arrogance." His death came in the highly charged pre-election atmosphere of the 2010 parliamentary election, and led to widespread domestic and international media coverage. United States Assistant Secretary of State for Public Affairs Philip J. Crowley said that the United States was saddened by Brito's death. Venezuelan Vice President Elías Jaua expressed "regret", reiterating the government's position that Brito's land "had never been expropriated". The government stated that opposition politicians and media were trying to exploit his protest for political gain. On the receipt of a private petition after his death, the Attorney General announced an investigation into whether Brito had been induced to commit suicide by continuing the hunger strike.

== See also ==
- Agriculture in Venezuela
