= Movement for a Responsible, Sustainable and Entrepreneurial Venezuela =

Political party in Venezuela

Movement for a Responsible, Sustainable and Entrepreneurial Venezuela Movimiento por una Venezuela Responsable, Sostenible y Emprendedora
- Leader: Alexis Romero
- Founded: February 2012
- Headquarters: Caracas, Venezuela
- Ideology: Green politics
- Political position: Centre-left
- National affiliation: Democratic Unity Roundtable
- Colours: Green

Website
- Official site

Movement for a Responsible, Sustainable and Entrepreneurial Venezuela (Spanish: Movimiento por una Venezuela Responsable, Sostenible y Emprendedora, MOVERSE) is a green political party in Venezuela.

== History ==
The Ecological Movement of Venezuela is historically, the second Venezuelan political green party. The party grew to become a recognized political entity by the National Electoral Council in February 2012. They define themselves a center-left environmentalist political movement aiming to promote a new National Political Project holding democracy, sustainable economy and inclusive communities as the foundations of the new free, innovative, responsible and progressive new plural citizenship.

== See also ==
- List of political parties in Venezuela
