= Emergent People =

Emergent People Gente Emergente
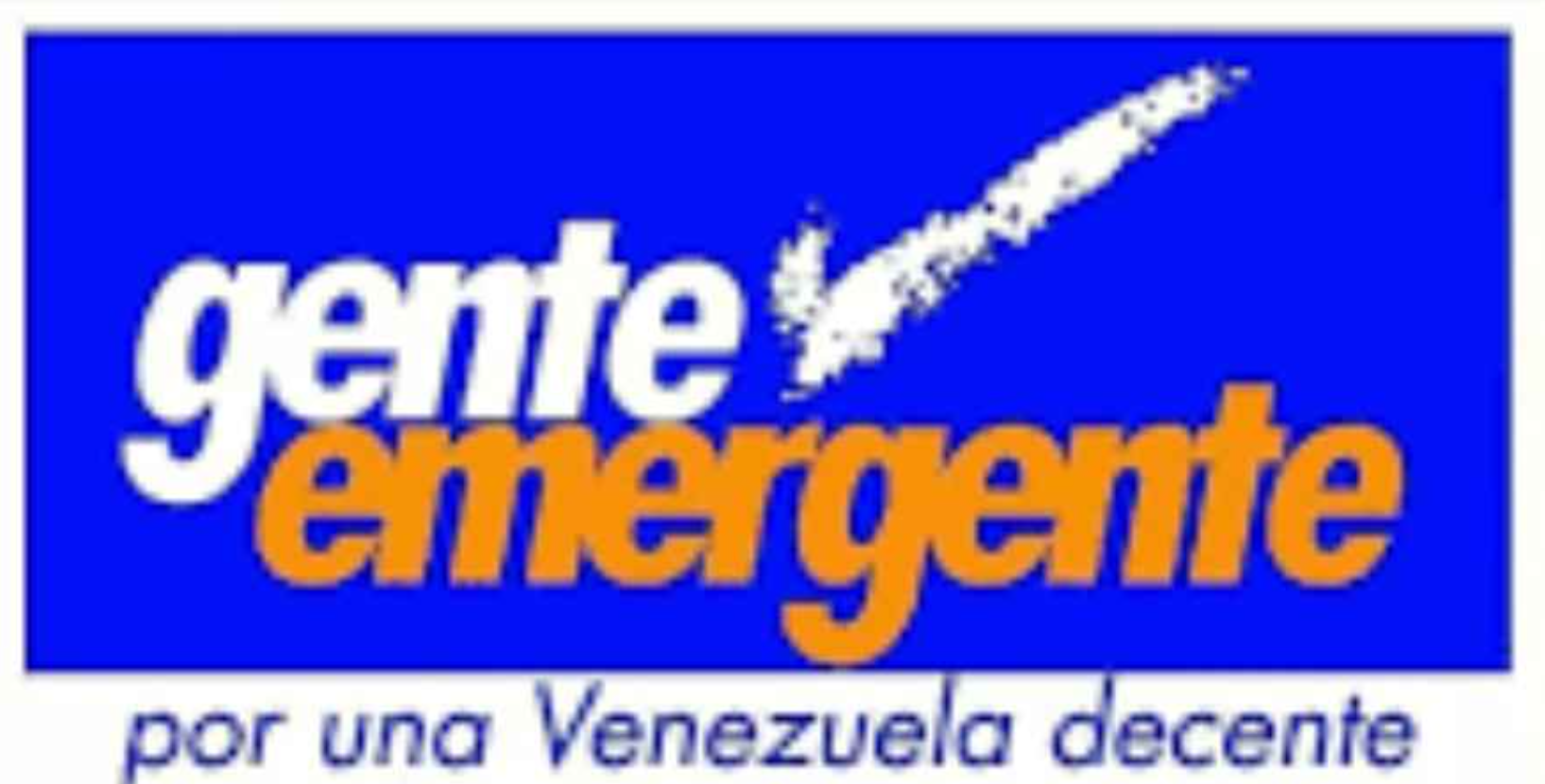
- Leader: Fernando Alvarez
- Secretary-General: Francisco Marquez
- Founded: June 22, 1991
- Headquarters: Caracas, Venezuela
- Ideology: Christian democracy Christian humanism
- Political position: Centre
- National affiliation: Unitary Platform
- Colors: Blue, white, and yellow

Emergent People (Spanish: Gente Emergente, GE) is a Venezuelan centrist political party, founded on June 22, 1991, by Fernando Alvarez.

Since its founding the party's leadership was divided between immediate merging with the United Socialist Party of Venezuela (PSUV) or a discussion that included all the factors that supported the former president Hugo Chávez. After a long discussion, the merger into PSUV did not occur and GE remained as an independent party. Currently GE is not eligible to participate in elections.

== Ideology ==
GE identifies itself as “a political community that aspires to be a useful organizational channel for the transformation of Venezuelan society from an ethical perspective, based on humanist heritage, on a historical liberating Christian and ancestral analysis of our people” according to its official blog.

== Electoral history ==
In the 1993 general election, GE supported the candidate Oswaldo Álvarez Paz of the Copei party, at that election GE obtained just over 5,000 votes, 0.09% of popular vote. In the 1998 presidential elections and 2000 presidential elections they supported Hugo Chávez, achieving the party's expansion throughout Venezuela, reaching its historical maximum with 56,500 votes, (0.86%). In the 2004 regional elections and 2005 parliamentary elections GE has received 49,200 votes, (0.79%) and remained among the top 25 largest political parties in Venezuela. In the 2006 presidential election it obtained 29,690 votes (0.26%) votes for its candidate Hugo Chávez.

In the 2008 regional elections, PSUV candidates were ordered to reject the support of GE. The national leadership of the PSUV expelled GE from its alliance because it registered Julio César Reyes as a candidate for the governorship of Barinas and Lenny Manuitt for the governorship of Guárico, instead of Adán Chávez and Willian Lara. This led to GE indefinitely breaking with the government of Hugo Chávez. In the 2008 regional elections, GE obtained its highest electoral percentage, obtaining 133,593 votes (1.34%) throughout the country.

In 2011, they announced their participation in the 2012 Democratic Unity Roundtable presidential primary, supporting the candidacy of Pablo Pérez Álvarez, the governor of the state of Zulia to be the sole candidate for the opposition bloc to face Hugo Chávez on October 7 in the 2012 presidential elections.

Following the defeat of Pablo Pérez Álvarez in the MUD primaries, they announced their support, along with the other parties of the Democratic Unity Roundtable for the candidacy of Henrique Capriles Radonski against the re-election of Hugo Chávez in the 2012 presidential elections.

They participated in the MUD primaries for the 2015 parliamentary elections, only presenting two candidates, among them, was the Jesús Gómez, nominated to be a governor of the state of Anzoátegui.

In 2018, 10 deputies resigned from GE and joined unnamed political movement led by Leocenis García.

On November 23, 2021, GE held a meeting of national, regional and municipal leaders, with the purpose of "taking stock of the national political situation", after the death of the founding leader of GE, Fernando Álvarez Paz.

On March 17, 2023, GE backed the candidacy of opposition leaders Maria Corina Machado and Juan Guaidó in the 2023 presidential primaries organized by the Unitary Platform, making it the fourth political organization to support them in less than three weeks.
