= Universidad Monteávila =

University in Caracas, Venezuela

Coordinates: 10.477877°N 66.841314°W

- Universidad Monteávila
- Type: Private University
- Established: 1998
- Founders: Dr. Enrique Pérez Olivares, Dr. Fernando Cervigón Marcos, Pbro. Dr. Rafael de Balbín Berham, Arq. Alicia Álamo Bartolomé, Dr. Joaquín Rodríguez Alonso.
- Religious affiliation: Catholic, Opus Dei
- Rector: Guillermo Fariñas Contreras
- Location: Caracas, Venezuela
- Mascot: Casimiro
- Website: https://www.uma.edu.ve/

Universidad Monteávila (UMA) is a private, Roman Catholic - Opus Dei - University in Caracas, Venezuela. It was founded in 1998 by members of Opus Dei. Its education is humanities-based, offering majors in Law, Education, Business Administration and Social Communication.

== Notable alumni ==
- Alejandra Otero, comedian
- Daniela di Giacomo, beauty pageant and television presenter
