= Liberal Force =

Venezuelan political party

Liberal Force (Spanish: Fuerza Liberal, FL) is a centre-right political party in Venezuela. It was founded in 2003 by Haydée Deutsch.

== History ==
The party's first electoral test was the 2004 regional elections, in which it received only obtained 2,854 votes (0.04%). In the 2005 parliamentary elections the party received only 644 votes for the National Assembly elections, but received 8,902 votes (0.30%) in the vote for the Andean Parliament.

It was part of the National Unity coalition that supported runners-up Manuel Rosales in the 2006 presidential elections. In 2007 the party joined the People's Alternative Directory alliance alongside Independent Solidarity, the Republican Movement and Emerging Vision.

In the 2010 parliamentary elections the party received 14,547 votes (0.13%) in the party list vote and 27,535 votes (0.17%) in the constituency vote, but again failed to win a seat. It was part of the Democratic Unity Roundtable alliance that supported runners-up Henrique Capriles in the 2012 presidential elections.
