= Leopoldo Castillo =

Venezuelan lawyer

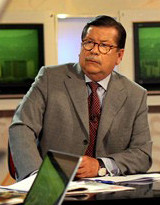
Leopoldo Castillo on the show

Helimenes Leopoldo Castillo Atencio (born 30 September 1946 in Maracaibo, Venezuela) also known as The Citizen is a Venezuelan lawyer, talk show host and political commentator.

== Diplomat ==
Castillo was the Venezuelan ambassador to El Salvador from 12 November 1981 to 26 January 1983, when he was replaced by Pedro Emilio Coll.

== TV host and manager ==
Castillo hosted the television program Aló Ciudadano on Globovisión, which gave citizens the right to speak both to defend themselves and to reply to any news that was on the air. The program was created in response to the Aló Presidente program of president Hugo Chávez.

Aló Ciudadano was on the air for twelve years and stopped broadcast on 16 August 2013 in a last broadcast where multiple journalists were being fired or resigned.

On 14 January 2020, Leopold was appointed by the National Assembly of Venezuela as president of multistate news television network Telesur.

== Miami ==
As of 2021, Castillo lives in Miami and runs a television program on MiraTV entitled Ciudadano.
