= National Council of Venezuelan Indians =

Political party in Venezuela

National Council of Venezuelan Indians Consejo Nacional Indio de Venezuela
- Abbreviation: CONIVE
- Leader: Noelí Pocaterra
- President: Nicia Maldonado
- Founded: 1989
- Headquarters: Caracas, Venezuela
- Ideology: Indigenismo; Bolivarianism
- Political position: Left-Wing

Website
- http://www.conive.org/
- Politics of Venezuela; Political parties; Elections; The party only fields candidates in states with indigenous representation (Amazonas, Anzoátegui, Bolívar, Delta Amacuro, Sucre and Zulia)

The National Council of Venezuelan Indians (Spanish: Consejo Nacional Indio de Venezuela, CONIVE) is a political party in Venezuela.

The party was established in 1989 and is composed of over 60 organizations and representatives from 34 indigenous ethnic groups including the Warao, Yucpa, Wayuu, Timotes, Panare, Yanomami and Yecuana, among others. At the 2000 Venezuelan parliamentary election, the party won 3 out of 165 seats in the National Assembly of Venezuela. At the 2010 Venezuelan parliamentary election it won 1 seat. The party is supportive of the Bolivarian Revolution and the party's fundamental ideas about indigenous representation and empowerment adopted by the Bolivarian Constitution of Venezuela.
