= Regional Advance Movement =

Venezuelan political party

- Leader: Morel Rodriguez
- Founded: 2001
- National affiliation: Democratic Alliance (Venezuela)

Regional Advance Movement (MRA) (Spanish: Movimiento Regional de Avanzada) is a Venezuelan political party of a regional nature that only has a presence in the State of Nueva Esparta, it was founded in April 2001. It is a party opposed to the administration of the Bolivarian Revolution.

In the 2021 Venezuelan regional elections, Morel Rodriguez was elected governor of Nueva Esparta from 2021 to 2025.

== History ==
In 2001, a sector of AD from the state of Nueva Esparta also separated from the party and created the Regional Advance Movement (MRA).

In the 2004 regional elections they supported Morel Rodríguez, from the Democratic Action party, as a candidate for the governorship of the Nueva Esparta State, and he was elected, with the support of other political parties such as Copei, Primero Justicia, among other political movements.

In the 2017 municipal elections, they nominated their leader, Morel Rodríguez Salcedo as a candidate for mayor of the Maneiro municipality, being elected with 58.39% of the votes, however Rodríguez had the support of Copei, Nuvipa, MAS and IPP.

== See also ==
- Democratic Unity Roundtable
- Democratic Alliance (Venezuela)
