= Resistencia Civil =

Libertarian political movement in Venezuela

Resistencia Civil (Civil Resistance) is a libertarian political movement in Venezuela which advocates classical liberal principles, i.e., limited government and free market. The movement is led by Domingo Alberto Rangel, who holds the rank of executive secretary of the Resistencia Civil. Guillermo Rodríguez is the chief economist of the movement.
