= Organized Socialist Party in Venezuela =

Political party in Venezuela

Organized Socialist Party in Venezuela Partido Socialista Organizado en Venezuela
- Abbreviation: PSOEV
- President: Fernando Lisboa
- Secretary-General: Jaime Gonzalez
- Founded: 2006
- Headquarters: Caracas
- Ideology: Bolivarianism; Humanism; Socialism; Feminism; Democratic socialism
- Political position: Left-wing
- National affiliation: Great Patriotic Pole
- Colors: Yellow; Black; Red
- National Assembly: 0 / 277
- Governors: 0 / 23
- Mayors: 1 / 335
- Latin American Parliament: 0 / 12

Website
- www.psoev.org.ve

The Organized Socialist Party in Venezuela (PSOEV) is a Venezuelan democratic socialist political party. It was founded and legalized in 2006 and formally registered before the National Electoral Council (CNE) on July 11 of the same year by its directors Alejandro Moncada, Edgar Gómez, Faride Hobacay, Carlos Córdoba and Raúl León.

It was inspired by the Spanish Socialist Workers' Party (PSOE), although there is no direct political links between the two parties. It is a critical and vanguard party that seeks to deepen and contribute to the construction of socialism in Venezuela.
