= Aló Ciudadano =

Venezuelan talk show hosted by Leopoldo Castillo

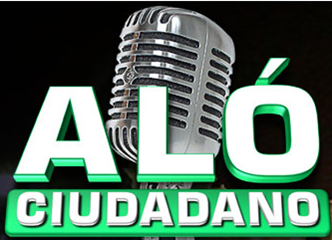
- Created by: Leopoldo Castillo
- Starring: Leopoldo Castillo; Carlos Acosta; Marjorie Martínez; José Francisco Rivera; María Isabel Párraga; Isabel González Capriles; Alejandra Otero; Sheina Chang Montero; Mariana Reyes
- Country of origin: Venezuela

Production
- Running time: 3 hours

Original release
- Network: Globovisión (2002-2013), Circuito Nacional Belfort (2002-2008), RCR (2009-2013).
- Release: September 27, 2002 – August 16, 2013.

Aló Ciudadano (lit. 'Hello Citizen') is a Venezuelan talk show hosted by Leopoldo Castillo as the opposition counterpart of Aló Presidente launched by Hugo Chávez government in 1999. It was aired both on the Globovisión 24-hour television news network and Radio Caracas Radio (RCR) network until 2013.

== Format ==
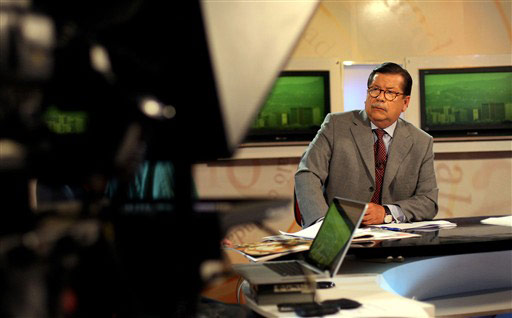
Host Leopoldo Castillo at Aló Ciudadano studios.

Aló Ciudadano was hosted by Leopoldo Castillo and co-hosted by journalist Sheila Chang Montero, Maria Alejandra Trujillo and Pedro Pablo Peñaloza.

The show was interactive; people were able to call the show and give their opinions and/or complaints or they could send text messages, which appeared on the news ticker. Leopoldo Castillo conducted interviews and he usually discussed politics.

Leopoldo Castillo began his show saying "Ciudadanos de la República Bolivariana de Venezuela" ("citizens of the Bolivarian Republic of Venezuela"). During the show, Sheina Chang read news headlines from the main news websites of Venezuela and Latin America, and conducted interviews along with Castillo.

Although Aló Ciudadano opposed Chávez's government, they invited numerous pro-Chávez people on his show, such as the former mayor of the Libertador municipality, Freddy Bernal.

== History ==
The show began airing in late 2002, and was originally hosted by Leopoldo Castillo and co-hosted by Carlos Acosta and Marjorie Martínez. It was the most popular opinion program for the Venezuelan political opposition to Hugo Chávez and Nicolas Maduro governments. While in Venezuela many newspapers, radio stations, television broadcasting companies, and websites which are in majority opposed to the government are closing down, Aló Ciudadano was one of the few broadcasts (mainly in Globovision) that were not owed by or affiliated to the Venezuelan government. The show revived in 2016 as "El Ciudadano" on MiraTV. The show followed the same format, however it ran 1 hour Monday-Friday instead of 3 hours like its predecessor. The show debuted in July 2016 and ended in December 2016 and was viewable on television and YouTube. It is believed that the show has been quietly cancelled for unknown reasons, yet Leopoldo Castillo hasn't made an official announcement for the show's 2017 scheduling.

== Hosts ==
Actuales
Country	Name	Períod	Cast
Venezuela	Leopoldo Castillo	2002 — 2013	Conductor Principal
Venezuela	Sheina Chang	2005 — 2013	Conductora Principal
Venezuela	Pedro Pablo Peñaloza	2010 — 2013	Conductor Secundario
Venezuela	Maria Alejandra Trujillo	2011 — 2013	Conductora Secundaria
Suplents
Country	Name	Períod	
Venezuela	Nitu Pérez Osuna	2002-2013	
Venezuela	María Elena Lavaud	2002-2013	
Formers
Country	Name	Períod	
Venezuela	Andreína Fuenmayor	2010 — 2012	
Venezuela	Mariana Reyes	2008 — 2011	
Venezuela	María Isabel Párraga	2004 — 2008	
Venezuela	Alejandra Otero	2005 — 2007	
Venezuela	José Francisco Rivera	2004 — 2005	
Venezuela	Isabel González Capriles	2004 — 2005	
Venezuela	Marjorie Martínez	2002 — 2004	
Venezuela	Carlos Acosta	2002 — 2004	

== See also ==
- Globovisión
