= Miguel Henrique Otero =

Venezuelan journalist (born 1947)

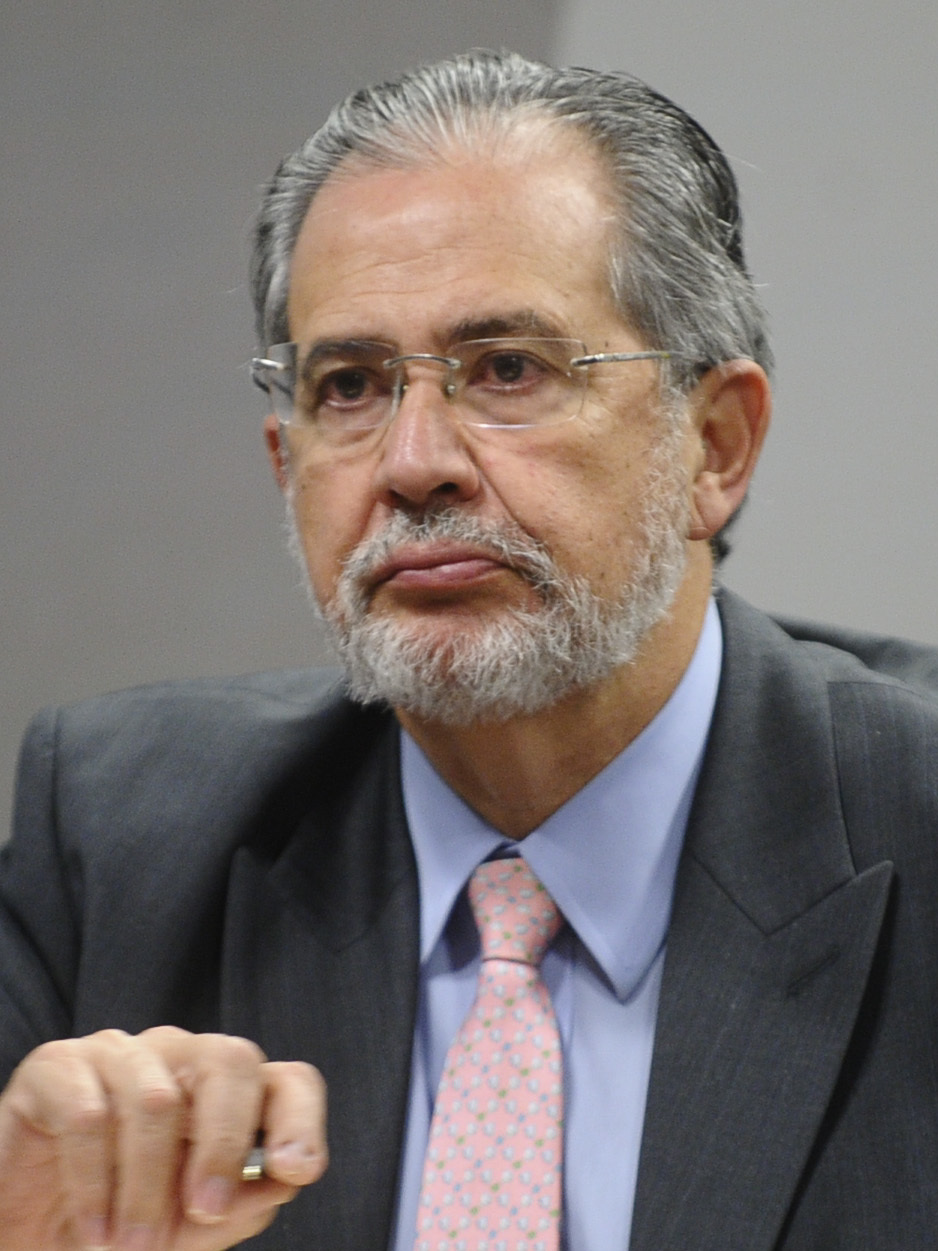
Miguel Henrique Otero in 2015

Miguel Henrique Otero (born 1947) is a Venezuelan journalist, and he is the president and CEO of El Nacional newspaper. He was Vice President of Bloque de Prensa, the main press association in his home country. Otero is recognized as a pioneer in the use of new technologies, in journalism and media companies management. He is also the former president of Grupo de Diarios America, board member of the Inter American Press Association and of the World Association of Newspapers and News Publishers, WAN-IFRA.

== Education ==
Otero holds a bachelor's degree in mathematics from the Central University of Venezuela. After his postgraduate studies in Business Administration, he traveled to Europe where he studied economics at Churchill College, Cambridge University and Sociology at Sorbonne University. After returning to Venezuela he began an extensive cultural, politics and business activity which continues today.

== Public activity ==
In 1977 he was appointed as General Secretary of the Caracas Athenaeum the country's leading non-governmental cultural institution centered on the arts. He launched the Caracas Athenaeum Editorial where 600 titles were published. In 1983 he was elected independent deputy at the National Congress representing Anzoátegui's State appointed by Democracia Cristiana. In 1988 he is reelected and in 1993 he repeats once again he repeats but on uninominal basis. In late 2007 Otero founded an opposition movement called Movimiento 2D, which supported the electoral coalition of Venezuelan political parties, Mesa de la Unidad Democrática (MUD) in the 2010 Venezuelan parliamentary election. In April 2015, judge María Eugenia Núñez ordered a prohibition to leave Venezuela to 22 directors of El Nacional, La Patilla and Tal Cual, including Miguel Henrique Otero, they were accused of aggravated defamation to the president of the National Assembly, Diosdado Cabello. As a result of the threats and the legal measures, he left Venezuela and have been forced to run his newspaper from Madrid. The Venezuelan government targeted him for several lawsuits of political nature and has publicly threatened him with imprisonment if he returns to his country. Otero has expressed his support for Juan Guiado, President of the National Assembly of Venezuela, who in January 2019 was declared acting president of Venezuela.

== Awards ==
On November 23, 2010, he received the award Premio Internacional de Periodismo prize presented by the Spanish newspaper El Mundo. On 2015, he received the Premio Luca De Tena which is granted by the newspaper ABC from Spain. Miguel Henrique Otero's nomination was proposed by the former Spanish president José María Aznar and the former Colombian president Andrés Pastrana. Otero on July 13, 2017, got the Libertad award given by the Club Liberal from Spain. On February 12, 2020, The World Law Foundation awarded him with a medal for his defense of democracy.
