= Venezuelan People's Union =

The Venezuelan Popular Union (Unión Popular Venezolana, UPV) was a political party in Venezuela. The UPV was built along 'Browderist' pattern. UPV had its roots in the Municipal Union (UM), which had been legalized in 1941 and had functioned as a legal cover for the underground Communist Party of Venezuela. The party was founded on March 13, 1944, through the merger of the Municipal Union of the Federal District, the Zulian Unification League and eleven state-level 'People's Unions'. The decision to form UPV as a political party was taken at the Fourth National Conference of the Communist Party of Venezuela.

The UPV was legalized on March 16, 1944. Rodolfo Quintero was the chairman of UPV.

UPV formed an alliance with the followers of Isaías Medina Angarita ahead of the 1944 Caracas municipal elections. The alliance won the election.

UPV was disbanded as the Communist Party was legalized on October 9, 1945.

== See also ==
List of political parties in Venezuela
