= Venezuelan Popular Unity =

Political party in Venezuela

Venezuelan Popular Unity Unidad Popular Venezolana
- Founder: Lina Ron
- Founded: 6 February 2004
- Ideology: Bolivarianism; Communism; Socialism; Anti-imperialism; Marxism
- Political position: Left-wing
- National affiliation: Great Patriotic Pole

Website
- upvsucre.es

Venezuelan Popular Unity (Unidad Popular Venezolana) is a left-wing political party in Venezuela. It supported president Hugo Chávez and currently supports his successor Nicolás Maduro. It won one seat in the National Assembly in the 2005 Venezuelan parliamentary election. It merged into the United Socialist Party of Venezuela in 2007 but then was reinstated as a party in 2008.
