= 2005 Venezuelan parliamentary election =

- 4 December 2005
- All 167 seats in the National Assembly; 84 seats needed for a majority
- Turnout: 25.26% (▼30.77pp)
Party	Leader	Vote %	Seats
MVR and allies	Hugo Chávez	85.49	164
MUPI		0.31	1
UPPI		0.27	1
AMANSA		–	1
This lists parties that won seats. See the complete results below.
Results by constituency and party-list vote by state
President of the NA before	President of the NA
Nicolás Maduro; PSUV	Cilia Flores; PSUV

Parliamentary elections were held in Venezuela on 4 December 2005 to elect the 167 deputies to the National Assembly of Venezuela, twelve deputies to the Latin American Parliament and five deputies to the Andean Parliament. Several days prior to the elections, five opposition parties unexpectedly withdrew, shortly after a dispute over the voting process had apparently been resolved with the support of the Organization of American States (OAS). The opposition had been expected to get around a third of the Assembly seats, or even less; the withdrawal meant the opposition were scarcely represented in the parliament at all, as the opposition parties which did not withdraw failed to win any seats. 114 seats went to the President's Fifth Republic Movement (MVR) – up from 86, with the remaining 53 going to "smaller pro-Chávez parties as well as to independents and representatives of some social groups that support the government".

Both the Organization of American States (OAS) and the European Union sent delegations to observe the elections. In the runup to the election, there were concerns about the use of digital fingerprint scanners as part of the voting process. On 28 November the National Electoral Council (CNE), in a decision brokered by the OAS, announced that it would not use the controversial machines. Several days later five opposition parties withdrew from the elections.

Both the EU and the OAS noted a widespread distrust of the National Electoral Council. "The OAS delegation noted that there remains a distrust of the CNE on the part of a significant segment of the population in terms of the origin and composition of the CNE and the perception that its actions lack transparency and impartiality." The OAS recommended democratic discussion of various aspects of the electoral process to improve trust in the system.

The election proceeded largely without incident, although three small bombs were exploded in Caracas, injuring one police officer.

== Campaign ==
=== Pre-election polls ===
"In the lead-up to the December 2005 election, observers predicted that the opposition would struggle to win one-third of the seats in the Assembly and that the pro-Chávez parties would win a two-thirds majority control of the legislature."

=== Electoral process audit ===
Since its announcement, the process was highly criticized by Henry Ramos Allup (secretary general of Democratic Action), Teodoro Petkoff (Movement for Socialism) and Manuel Rosales (A New Era). An audit was made in presence of the National Electoral Council (CNE), OAS international observers and several political parties. During the audit, the opposition argued that the electoral machines recorded the sequence of the votes, while fingerprint scanners recorded the information of each voter. According to Ramos Allup, the fingerprint scanners allowed the electoral agencies to know which was the choice made by the voter, as demonstrated by computer technicians in the last few days before the CNE and international observers. He also denounced that the access to the software that registers the votes and the electoral roll was restricted to opponents and observers. The fingerprint scanners were altogether not connected to and in different places than the voting machines, and the lines of voters at each of the machine groups were unrelated. The opposition put forward the case that it was possible to unscramble the information, stating that cross-matching the data between the two machines could potentially show the voting details of those who voted. The reconstruction of the data is possible due to the requirement of access to the voting machines and knowledge of the password. The CNE agreed to format the data held on the voting machines as soon as these finished transmitting their precinct totals to the CNE. As long as every voting machine also printed its precinct totals, it was easy for all involved parties to check the validity of the data as reported in both instances, the printed precinct totals and the partial results reported in the CNE tallying center.

Both the Organization of American States (OAS) and the European Union sent delegations to observe the elections. On 28 November the National Electoral Council (CNE), in a decision brokered by the OAS, announced that it would not use the controversial machines. The CNE stood by its claim that the fingerprint scanners were not usable to identify the votes. The same devices had been used on the 2004 recall referendum, and the state governors' elections that same year.

=== Political parties' withdrawal ===
Democratic Action (Acción Democrática) withdrew from the election on 28 November, six days before the electoral process, showing its distrust of the National Electoral Council. On 30 November, COPEI (the Social Christian Party of Venezuela), Project Venezuela (Proyecto Venezuela), Justice First (Primero Justicia), A New Era (Un Nuevo Tiempo) and Movement for Socialism (Movimiento al Socialismo) all withdrew from the elections too. The political parties represented the majority of the opposition forces in the country.

The deadline for candidate withdrawal was Saturday, 3 December, at 4:00 pm. The CNE announced that not all of the boycotting political parties formally withdrew, meaning that only 10.08% of the candidates were officially out of the elections. The withdrawals left most opposition parties outside the election. Red Flag Party (Partido Bandera Roja) and Democratic Left (Izquierda Democrática) participated in the election but won no seats.

== Results ==
=== National Assembly ===
The CNE announced preliminary results that showed that the pro-Chávez party Fifth Republic Movement won 114 out of 167 seats in the National Assembly, and all other seats were won by allied parties. The Fifth Republic Movement list also received 89% of the vote for the Latin American Parliament and the Andean Parliament. The turnout in the election was about 25% compared to 50 to 60% in previous parliamentary elections (1998 and 2000).

The results were a very important issue in Venezuela, since a two-thirds majority in parliament was needed to change the constitution and the elections gave the Fifth Republic Movement a sufficient majority to change the constitution with or without the support of other political parties.

Party	Party-list			Constituency			Total seats
Party	Votes	%	Seats	Votes	%	Seats	Total seats
Fifth Republic Movement	1,871,860	55.08	54	724,389	16.79	11	65
For Social Democracy	277,482	8.16	0				0
Fatherland for All	197,459	5.81	0				0
Unit of Election Winners	169,433	4.99	8	2,810,359	65.12	86	94
Communist Party of Venezuela	94,606	2.78	0				0
Optimistic People	61,789	1.82	0				0
Venezuelan Popular Unity	46,232	1.36	0	15,056	0.35	0	0
Tupamaro	42,893	1.26	0	47,576	1.10	0	0
People's Electoral Movement	38,690	1.14	0				0
Independents for National Community	31,144	0.92	0	41,402	0.96	0	0
MIGATO	25,710	0.76	0				0
Revolutional Bastion Movement of 204 Phases	22,995	0.68	0	31,739	0.74	0	0
Militant Civic Movement	21,012	0.62	0	36,086	0.84	0	0
Movement of Integration for the People	20,482	0.60	2				2
Radical Cause	18,960	0.56	0	12,675	0.29	0	0
Republican Movement	18,601	0.55	0	27,929	0.65	0	0
United for Human Rights	18,208	0.54	0	40,081	0.93	0	0
Only One People	15,981	0.47	0	19,755	0.46	0	0
Justice First	15,939	0.47	0	26	0.00	0	0
National Salvation Movement	14,139	0.42	0	23,763	0.55	0	0
Emerging Popele	12,924	0.38	0	13,590	0.31	0	0
Socialist League	11,930	0.35	0	1,579	0.04	0	0
PVL	11,342	0.33	0	14,392	0.33	0	0
Social Independent Alliance of Sucre	10,515	0.31	0				0
United Movement of Indigenous Peoples	10,493	0.31	1				1
Network of People	9,840	0.29	0				0
Patriotic Union	9,128	0.27	0				0
Movement for Socialism	9,118	0.27	0	49	0.00	0	0
Organised Independent Front for Portuguesa	9,042	0.27	0	10,075	0.23	0	0
Labour Power	8,272	0.24	0	6,899	0.16	0	0
Democratic Action	8,000	0.24	0	11	0.00	0	0
Active Nationalist Democracy Organisation	7,868	0.23	0	25,448	0.59	0	0
Agricultural Action	7,843	0.23	0	551	0.01	0	0
Popular Front	6,885	0.20	0	11,324	0.26	0	0
Copei	6,730	0.20	0				0
Independent Movement for Maracaibo	6,213	0.18	0				0
Independent Movement for Zulia	6,058	0.18	0				0
Alternative Revolutionary Independent Movement of Guarico	5,808	0.17	0	5,530	0.13	0	0
Project Venezuela	5,645	0.17	0	4	0.00	0	0
RZ-2021	5,158	0.15	0				0
Patriotic Union of Carabobo	4,899	0.14	0				0
Open the Gap	4,599	0.14	0				0
Movement for Direct Democracy	4,553	0.13	0	19,413	0.45	0	0
Dialogue	4,365	0.13	0				0
For the Love of the City	3,667	0.11	0	3,789	0.09	0	0
Free Voters	3,604	0.11	0	4,907	0.11	0	0
Renewing Democracy	3,490	0.10	0	8,664	0.20	0	0
Solution	3,391	0.10	0	7,818	0.18	0	0
United Youth in National Action with Bimba	3,357	0.10	0	4,450	0.10	0	0
Independent Organisation for Reunification and Stability	3,220	0.09	0	9,541	0.22	0	0
Frutos Regional Party	3,209	0.09	0				0
Let Us Break Chains	3,194	0.09	0	5,665	0.13	0	0
United Multi-Ethnic Peoples of Amazonas	3,180	0.09	0				0
Independent Ethnic Rescue with Alternative Ideals	3,102	0.09	0	1,416	0.03	0	0
Consensus	2,928	0.09	0	6,177	0.14	0	0
RENACE	2,911	0.09	0	2,028	0.05	0	0
New Dawn	2,836	0.08	0				0
Democratic Republican Union	2,776	0.08	0	2,497	0.06	0	0
National Opinion	2,774	0.08	0	5,397	0.13	0	0
Red Flag Party	2,691	0.08	0	1,061	0.02	0	0
New Day	2,680	0.08	0	3,822	0.09	0	0
Movement of New People	2,635	0.08	0	4,663	0.11	0	0
Portuguesa is First	2,582	0.08	0	2,399	0.06	0	0
Independent Solidarity	2,484	0.07	0	2,797	0.06	0	0
Revolution in the Region	2,333	0.07	0				0
National Integration Front	2,321	0.07	0	5,748	0.13	0	0
Movement of Participation and Protagonism of the People	2,296	0.07	0	2,808	0.07	0	0
Centre	2,282	0.07	0	5,354	0.12	0	0
HALCOM	2,188	0.06	0	1,253	0.03	0	0
Democrat Party	2,173	0.06	0	3,107	0.07	0	0
MISOLA Party	2,163	0.06	0	6,053	0.14	0	0
Indigenous Parliament of Venezuela	2,138	0.06	0				0
FRD	2,084	0.06	0	1,919	0.04	0	0
Venezuela First	1,961	0.06	0	2,712	0.06	0	0
Cojedes Regional Force of Integration	1,908	0.06	0				0
Solidarity	1,883	0.06	0	528	0.01	0	0
Movimiento Conciencia de País	1,788	0.05	0	1,391	0.03	0	0
Zamoranos de Venezuela Patria y Vida	1,750	0.05	0	2,506	0.06	0	0
Popular Organization for Work and Revolutionary Action	1,672	0.05	0	1,832	0.04	0	0
Left	1,646	0.05	0	131	0.00	0	0
Labour Movement	1,578	0.05	0	3,780	0.09	0	0
LGP	1,567	0.05	0				0
LG	1,522	0.04	0	876	0.02	0	0
PRR	1,522	0.04	0				0
Electoral Generation of Monagüense Integrity	1,489	0.04	0				0
FAI	1,442	0.04	0	1,574	0.04	0	0
MPSDCP	1,430	0.04	0	2,425	0.06	0	0
Alternative Revolutionary Independent Movement	1,280	0.04	0	735	0.02	0	0
Venezuelan Revolutionary Currents	1,225	0.04	0				0
AZ	1,191	0.04	0	1,142	0.03	0	0
Volunteers for Democracy	1,190	0.04	0				0
MAPV	1,163	0.03	0	3,086	0.07	0	0
Constructors of a Country	1,159	0.03	0				0
PDI	1,149	0.03	0				0
PODER 7	1,120	0.03	0	1,255	0.03	0	0
Third Millennium Venezuela	1,081	0.03	0	3,142	0.07	0	0
OFI	1,050	0.03	0				0
CD	1,036	0.03	0				0
Organised Youth of Venezuela	1,007	0.03	0	1,389	0.03	0	0
MT	989	0.03	0	794	0.02	0	0
National Party	952	0.03	0				0
Independent Community Organized Movement	923	0.03	0	2,403	0.06	0	0
21st Century Movement	923	0.03	0	1,978	0.05	0	0
NED	895	0.03	0				0
Networks Party	885	0.03	0	1,092	0.03	0	0
NE	883	0.03	0	1,064	0.02	0	0
MPRCOL	845	0.02	0	430	0.01	0	0
FUVE	831	0.02	0				0
PROSOYAR	814	0.02	0	1,518	0.04	0	0
Militant Compromise	810	0.02	0	1,058	0.02	0	0
Neighbourhood Community Movement	794	0.02	0	1,400	0.03	0	0
Independent Organized Generation of Electoral Tactics	774	0.02	0				0
MRGD	767	0.02	0	4,300	0.10	0	0
ESO	753	0.02	0				0
Urgencia Solidaria de Transformación Estadal Democrática	749	0.02	0				0
The Spark	720	0.02	0	1,544	0.04	0	0
UPR	706	0.02	0	1,551	0.04	0	0
Deltana Justice	703	0.02	0				0
UNIF	703	0.02	0	2,186	0.05	0	0
National Democracy Party	701	0.02	0	690	0.02	0	0
Testimonio Optimista Neoespartano Generador de Oportunidades	665	0.02	0				0
PA	662	0.02	0	1,774	0.04	0	0
FLACSI	661	0.02	0	2,579	0.06	0	0
Neighbourhood Activity Political Party	655	0.02	0	961	0.02	0	0
Liberal Force	644	0.02	0	372	0.01	0	0
FVI	626	0.02	0	654	0.02	0	0
Vision Venezuela	615	0.02	0	909	0.02	0	0
Authentic Renewal Organization	606	0.02	0				0
Together for Trujillo Movement	601	0.02	0				0
New Pact	599	0.02	0	1,316	0.03	0	0
United for the State of Monagas	589	0.02	0				0
MIODUDO	587	0.02	0				0
MH	580	0.02	0	791	0.02	0	0
Communal Alliance of Miranda	574	0.02	0	703	0.02	0	0
Growing Vision	560	0.02	0	294	0.01	0	0
Movement of National Action	559	0.02	0				0
Independente Popular Alliance	553	0.02	0				0
United Front Movement	545	0.02	0	1,012	0.02	0	0
Experiencia Social Tenacidad Adelante Nosotros Ganamos	541	0.02	0	1,075	0.02	0	0
COAS	518	0.02	0	634	0.01	0	0
ARDE	511	0.02	0	456	0.01	0	0
Socialist Left Party	507	0.01	0	1,313	0.03	0	0
National Independent Union of Social Organizations	505	0.01	0				0
MOE	491	0.01	0				0
OI	486	0.01	0	681	0.02	0	0
We Are Vargas Independent Movement	483	0.01	0	923	0.02	0	0
MOMASO	474	0.01	0				0
PCH	469	0.01	0				0
Amazonian Citizen Action	468	0.01	0				0
MOMUDEMI	468	0.01	0	1,774	0.04	0	0
PTC	468	0.01	0	407	0.01	0	0
Patriotic Union of Guarico	451	0.01	0	383	0.01	0	0
FURPAR	448	0.01	0				0
FELO	443	0.01	0	858	0.02	0	0
REACA	436	0.01	0	454	0.01	0	0
GETION	425	0.01	0	1,772	0.04	0	0
MIVO	425	0.01	0				0
National Independent Organization	425	0.01	0	861	0.02	0	0
TUV	418	0.01	0	867	0.02	0	0
Civil Society 95	417	0.01	0	1,993	0.05	0	0
LAP	414	0.01	0				0
TIO	408	0.01	0	1,149	0.03	0	0
Nationalist Civic Crusade	406	0.01	0	1,136	0.03	0	0
Project Carabobo	406	0.01	0				0
The People Advance	403	0.01	0				0
Republican Vanguard Force	399	0.01	0	2,061	0.05	0	0
FURE 2003	390	0.01	0	460	0.01	0	0
LPBUENA	388	0.01	0	746	0.02	0	0
Renovación Organizada Grupo Emergente	388	0.01	0				0
EB	379	0.01	0				0
Amigos de Alianza Libertadora Independente	378	0.01	0				0
RIN	375	0.01	0	903	0.02	0	0
PANV	369	0.01	0	747	0.02	0	0
MRG2000	365	0.01	0				0
Liberal United People's Movement	363	0.01	0	82	0.00	0	0
National Authentic Party	362	0.01	0				0
PRE‐VE	357	0.01	0	741	0.02	0	0
MARADE	355	0.01	0				0
Caroni Decides	352	0.01	0				0
Popular Youth Rising	348	0.01	0				0
URM 2021	342	0.01	0	1,564	0.04	0	0
ORECOM	341	0.01	0	369	0.01	0	0
Independent Revolutionary Union	340	0.01	0	611	0.01	0	0
Independents for Venezuela	752	0.02	0	1,451	0.03	0	0
Federal Republican Party	326	0.01	0	635	0.01	0	0
ED	323	0.01	0	641	0.01	0	0
VINE	320	0.01	0	230	0.01	0	0
Organised Independent Party	317	0.01	0				0
TC	315	0.01	0	771	0.02	0	0
The Alliance	310	0.01	0				0
Popular Christian Movement	308	0.01	0	730	0.02	0	0
PORD	308	0.01	0	309	0.01	0	0
Luces	299	0.01	0	144	0.00	0	0
Independents to 2000	296	0.01	0	516	0.01	0	0
MORAL	295	0.01	0				0
MIL	289	0.01	0	424	0.01	0	0
REALCI	284	0.01	0				0
Avanagua Party	276	0.01	0				0
UBARI	274	0.01	0				0
IPGENERO	267	0.01	0	144	0.00	0	0
MOVELA	265	0.01	0				0
RDP	265	0.01	0	809	0.02	0	0
National Rescue	265	0.01	0	249	0.01	0	0
Independent Amazonian Indigenous Movement	262	0.01	0	335	0.01	0	0
RESISTE	260	0.01	0	383	0.01	0	0
GEP	258	0.01	0	676	0.02	0	0
UREVAR	257	0.01	0	508	0.01	0	0
Sandinista Renewal Movement	253	0.01	0	565	0.01	0	0
Rumbo Seguro	252	0.01	0				0
Caduaico Party	250	0.01	0	911	0.02	0	0
My People of Aragua Movement	250	0.01	0				0
Centro Histórico Ético De Opinión	249	0.01	0				0
RASA	249	0.01	0	288	0.01	0	0
CER	248	0.01	0				0
Strength with Cati	248	0.01	0				0
Municipal Action	247	0.01	0	545	0.01	0	0
ARI	247	0.01	0				0
PUNTO	243	0.01	0	178	0.00	0	0
PILA	241	0.01	0				0
Moral Reserve	238	0.01	0				0
Social Cause	231	0.01	0				0
DMAA	225	0.01	0	137	0.00	0	0
OPC 98	225	0.01	0				0
HP	222	0.01	0				0
The Neighborhood	219	0.01	0	58	0.00	0	0
MJV	218	0.01	0	257	0.01	0	0
MIPREA	217	0.01	0				0
Propuesta Independiente Local Organizado Naciente	213	0.01	0				0
Epales	208	0.01	0	121	0.00	0	0
UNEI	207	0.01	0	195	0.00	0	0
VE	207	0.01	0	138	0.00	0	0
MLI	205	0.01	0				0
CA	203	0.01	0				0
FIMP	202	0.01	0	67	0.00	0	0
FUCI	202	0.01	0				0
POP	202	0.01	0				0
BIEM	200	0.01	0				0
MIVE	200	0.01	0				0
FUERTE	193	0.01	0				0
Mirandan People	193	0.01	0				0
PEI	191	0.01	0	579	0.01	0	0
CF	190	0.01	0	682	0.02	0	0
Independent Movement	190	0.01	0				0
LAC	189	0.01	0				0
Popular Base	188	0.01	0	8,541	0.20	0	0
COIN	183	0.01	0				0
MIO	183	0.01	0	282	0.01	0	0
Advanced Regional Movement	176	0.01	0				0
Ideal	174	0.01	0				0
EPSA	168	0.00	0	94	0.00	0	0
Arcomun	162	0.00	0	766	0.02	0	0
PFP	160	0.00	0				0
Civic Democratic Front	158	0.00	0	363	0.01	0	0
Guaraira Party	154	0.00	0	657	0.02	0	0
ASERNE	152	0.00	0	95	0.00	0	0
Yaracuy Movimos	148	0.00	0				0
AV-98	146	0.00	0				0
The Third Way	142	0.00	0	657	0.02	0	0
Popular Tribune	139	0.00	0				0
DS	138	0.00	0	175	0.00	0	0
RRP	138	0.00	0	182	0.00	0	0
MEA	136	0.00	0	176	0.00	0	0
PG	135	0.00	0				0
Justicia, Rectitud, Lealtad	125	0.00	0				0
Ritmo	122	0.00	0	393	0.01	0	0
Bolivarian Military Civic Front	119	0.00	0	595	0.01	0	0
Nosotros Organizados Elegimos	119	0.00	0				0
Communal Alliance of Guárico	112	0.00	0	157	0.00	0	0
Citizens United for Democracy	109	0.00	0				0
LD	109	0.00	0	281	0.01	0	0
UFS	109	0.00	0				0
People of Vargas	108	0.00	0	384	0.01	0	0
TANETANE	101	0.00	0	136	0.00	0	0
UCP	100	0.00	0	396	0.01	0	0
G-2000	95	0.00	0				0
New Direction of Amazonas	93	0.00	0	86	0.00	0	0
IS	87	0.00	0				0
UNEA	85	0.00	0	73	0.00	0	0
Citizen Force	84	0.00	0				0
Popular Democratic Force	82	0.00	0				0
AB‐2000	80	0.00	0				0
UNA POBA	76	0.00	0	54	0.00	0	0
PRID	68	0.00	0				0
MISOL	67	0.00	0				0
Oriente	63	0.00	0				0
PAR	60	0.00	0				0
New Party	59	0.00	0				0
FAMA	58	0.00	0	38	0.00	0	0
ANDI	57	0.00	0	620	0.01	0	0
MIIO	57	0.00	0				0
BS-21 Party	49	0.00	0				0
PCYVSNE	48	0.00	0				0
PNL	42	0.00	0				0
MIADELA	23	0.00	0	35	0.00	0	0
POPA	8	0.00	0	15	0.00	0	0
PISF	6	0.00	0	9	0.00	0	0
AMANSA				17,716	0.41	1	1
United for an Independent Portuguesa				12,746	0.30	1	1
National Integration Movement				11,994	0.28	0	0
New Insular Generation				8,823	0.20	0	0
CRM We are Guayana				8,041	0.19	0	0
Guayana				7,532	0.17	0	0
LUPINDA				6,497	0.15	0	0
United Communities of Portuguesa				4,468	0.10	0	0
Patriotic Socialist Youth				4,422	0.10	0	0
National Compromise				4,312	0.10	0	0
MAR				4,017	0.09	0	0
URA				1,901	0.04	0	0
MERI				1,680	0.04	0	0
Miranda Common Force				1,246	0.03	0	0
JUSTAM				1,091	0.03	0	0
II				878	0.02	0	0
Miranda State				809	0.02	0	0
MIYARA				781	0.02	0	0
VC				697	0.02	0	0
FP 2021				552	0.01	0	0
IN				477	0.01	0	0
GS				470	0.01	0	0
MPDP				405	0.01	0	0
MODESU				366	0.01	0	0
National Registry of Indigenous Communities				313	0.01	0	0
PGI				275	0.01	0	0
TM				217	0.01	0	0
ACN				188	0.00	0	0
PATRIA				154	0.00	0	0
Patriotic Revolutionary Alliance				144	0.00	0	0
TUY 21st Century				130	0.00	0	0
OLIVERA				64	0.00	0	0
SOSFED				48	0.00	0	0
FLD				47	0.00	0	0
MUNI				42	0.00	0	0
Others				124	0.00	0	0
Independent	2,202	0.06	0	52,875	1.23	0	0
Indigenous seats							3
Total	3,398,567	100.00	65	4,315,409	100.00	99	167
Valid votes	3,398,567	94.28		2,726,772	76.26		
Invalid/blank votes	206,174	5.72		848,821	23.74		
Total votes	3,604,741	100.00		3,575,593	100.00		
Registered voters/turnout	14,272,964	25.26		14,191,906	25.19		
Source: Election Passport, CNE, Asamblea Nacional

=== Andean Parliament ===
Party	Votes	%	Seats
Fifth Republic Movement	2,893,843	89.71	5
Republican Movement	70,538	2.19	0
Tupamaro	48,172	1.49	0
Justice First	48,027	1.49	0
Only One People	23,978	0.74	0
National Integration Front	20,931	0.65	0
Movement for Socialism	16,545	0.51	0
Democratic Action	15,181	0.47	0
MOBARE 200-4F	13,687	0.42	0
PVL	11,552	0.36	0
National Integration Movement	9,686	0.30	0
National Salvation Movement	9,201	0.29	0
Democrat Party	8,982	0.28	0
Solidarity	7,944	0.25	0
Project Venezuela	7,369	0.23	0
National Opinion	5,114	0.16	0
Movement of New People	4,734	0.15	0
United Youth in National Action with Bimba	3,360	0.10	0
Left	2,692	0.08	0
Labour Power	2,368	0.07	0
Let Us Break Chains	1,975	0.06	0
Total	3,225,879	100.00	5
Valid votes	3,225,879	91.85	
Invalid/blank votes	286,107	8.15	
Total votes	3,511,986	100.00	
Registered voters/turnout	13,928,900	25.21	
Source: CNE

=== Latin American Parliament ===
Party	Votes	%	Seats
Fifth Republic Movement	2,929,358	89.26	12
Justice First	97,409	2.97	0
Tupamaro	42,831	1.31	0
Republican Movement	39,829	1.21	0
Independents for National Community	32,205	0.98	0
Only One People	24,918	0.76	0
National Integration Movement	23,958	0.73	0
National Integration Front	21,095	0.64	0
Radical Cause	20,854	0.64	0
MOBARE 200-4F	12,957	0.39	0
PVL	11,356	0.35	0
Democrat Party	8,205	0.25	0
Movement of New People	4,365	0.13	0
Labour Power	3,917	0.12	0
United Youth in National Action with Bimba	2,999	0.09	0
RENACE	2,880	0.09	0
AA	2,834	0.09	0
Total	3,281,970	100.00	12
Valid votes	3,281,970	93.42	
Invalid/blank votes	231,167	6.58	
Total votes	3,513,137	100.00	
Registered voters/turnout	13,933,494	25.21	
Source: CNE

== Elected ==
Elected	Party	State	Constituency
Montenegro Nuñez, Juan Antonio	UVE	Amazonas	1st
Palau Patiño, Diogenes Edgildo	UVE	Amazonas	2nd
Ygarza, Julio Haron	MUPI	Amazonas	Party-list
Tachinamo García, Henry José	UVE	Anzoátegui	1st
Arónica Carreyó, Eduardo	UVE	Anzoátegui	2nd
Rodríguez Rauseo, Carmen Antonia	UVE	Anzoátegui	3rd
Sánchez Chacón, Luis Eduardo	UVE	Anzoátegui	3rd
Márquez Rodríguez, Hugo Rafael	UVE	Anzoátegui	4th
Rodríguez Gamboa, Ángel Luis	MVR	Anzoátegui	Party-list
Herrera Silva, Earle José	MVR	Anzoátegui	Party-list
Rodriguez Longart, Vicente José	MVR	Anzoátegui	Party-list
El Gatrif Mizher, Fahd	UVE	Apure	1st
Espinoza León, Carlos Roque	UVE	Apure	2nd
González Venero, Wilfredo	UVE	Apure	3rd
Jiménez, Cristóbal Leobardo	MVR	Apure	Party-list
Delgado Camejo, Rafael Antonio	MVR	Apure	Party-list
Gómez Abreu, Eddy Emilio	UVE	Aragua	1st
Querales Rodríguez, William Antonio	UVE	Aragua	1st
Nieves Colmenares, Eleazar	UVE	Aragua	2nd
Figuera González, Oscar Ramón	UVE	Aragua	3rd
Hidrobo Amoroso, Elvis Eduardo	UVE	Aragua	4th
Escarrá Malavé, Carlos	MVR	Aragua	Party-list
García, Ismael Concepción	MVR	Aragua	Party-list
Bastidas Martínez, Pedro Antonio	MVR	Aragua	Party-list
Isea Romero, Rafael Eduardo	MVR	Aragua	Party-list
Gualdrón, Gonzalo José	UVE	Barinas	1st
Azuaje Cordero, Wilmer José	UVE	Barinas	1st
Graterol Camacho, Jesús Ernesto	UVE	Barinas	2nd
Peña González, Geovanni José	MVR	Barinas	Party-list
Carreño Escobar, Pedro Miguel	MVR	Barinas	Party-list
Molina Bermúdez, Juan José	UVE	Bolívar	1st
Gil Barrios, Rafael Darío	UVE	Bolívar	1st
Rivero González, José Ramón	UVE	Bolívar	2nd
Medina Carrasco, Pastora Coromoto	UVE	Bolívar	2nd
Mata García, Victoria Mercedes	UVE	Bolívar	2nd
Cabello de Rojas, Diluvina de Jesús	UVE	Bolívar	3rd
El Zabayar Samara, Adel	MVR	Bolívar	Party-list
Solís de Sorrentino, Berkis Claret	MVR	Bolívar	Party-list
Ríos Bolívar, Rafael Ángel	MVR	Bolívar	Party-list
Lacava Evangelista, Rafael Alejandro	UVE	Carabobo	1st
Sotillo Infante, Isrrael Antonio	UVE	Carabobo	2nd
Ortega Campos, Saúl Antonio	UVE	Carabobo	3rd
García Prado, Orlando Fedor	UVE	Carabobo	4th
Gómez Denis, Osmar Enrique	UVE	Carabobo	4th
Álvarez Bracamonte, Raúl Jesús	UVE	Carabobo	5th
Vásquez Guzmán, Fernando Antonio	MVR	Carabobo	Party-list
Ameliach Orta, Francisco José	MVR	Carabobo	Party-list
Valls Brizuela, Laura María	MVR	Carabobo	Party-list
Pérez Sierra, Nancy Evarista	MVR	Carabobo	Party-list
Pirela Sánchez, Hayden Ovando	UVE	Cojedes	1st
Pérez, Juan Bautista	UVE	Cojedes	2nd
Salazar, Asdrúbal Coromoto	MVR	Cojedes	Party-list
Milano Rodríguez, Jhonny Owee	MVR	Cojedes	Party-list
Marcano Rodríguez, Omar	UVE	Delta Amacuro	1st
González, Enrique José	UVE	Delta Amacuro	2nd
Hernández Rodríguez, Henry José	MIGENTE	Delta Amacuro	Party-list
Loa del Valle, Tamaronis	MIGENTE	Delta Amacuro	Party-list
Santos Amaral, Desirée	UVE	Distrito Capital	1st
García Bravo, Reinaldo Alfredo	UVE	Distrito Capital	2nd
Medina Rojas, Carlos Alfredo	UVE	Distrito Capital	3rd
Dugarte Padrón, Juan Carlos	UVE	Distrito Capital	4th
Khan Fernández, José Salamat	UVE	Distrito Capital	5th
Vivas Velazco, Ramón Darío	UVE	Distrito Capital	6th
Flores, Cilia Adela	MVR	Distrito Capital	Party-list
Ríos, Flor María	MVR	Distrito Capital	Party-list
Maduro Moros, Nicolás	MVR	Distrito Capital	Party-list
Lander Moreno, Pedro Tomás	MVR	Distrito Capital	Party-list
Méndez González, Andrés Eloy	UVE	Falcón	1st
Manaure Costas, Aleydys Argelia	UVE	Falcón	2nd
Daal, Ulises Ramón	UVE	Falcón	3rd
Baldayo López, Henry Rafael	UVE	Falcón	4th
Castellar Padilla, Alberto Efraín	MVR	Falcón	Party-list
Eizaga Rujano, Maris Nohemí	MVR	Falcón	Party-list
Contreras Díaz, Eustoquio	UVE	Guárico	1st
Marín Laya, Juan José	UVE	Guárico	2nd
Rojas Rojas, Miguel Rafael	UVE	Guárico	3rd
Landaeta Domínguez, Ángel Eugenio	MVR	Guárico	Party-list
Albornoz Urbano, José Venancio	MVR	Guárico	Party-list
Lugo Rodríguez, Iván José	UVE	Lara	1st
Escalona Colina, José Rafael	UVE	Lara	1st
González, Pastor Paucides	UVE	Lara	1st
Peraza Rojas, Dennis Alberto	UVE	Lara	2nd
Contreras Hernández, Luis Antonio	UVE	Lara	2nd
Sáez de Sánquiz, Amalia Rosa	MVR	Lara	Party-list
Urdaneta Pereira, Briccio José	MVR	Lara	Party-list
Ferrer, Germán Darío	MVR	Lara	Party-list
Mora, José David	MVR	Lara	Party-list
El Aissami Maddah, Tareck Zaidan	UVE	Mérida	1st
Briceño Méndez, Manuel José	UVE	Mérida	2nd
Camacho Araujo, Obdulio José	UVE	Mérida	3rd
Ávila Ávila, María Alejandra	UVE	Mérida	4th
Ramírez Rosales, José Oscar	MVR	Mérida	Party-list
Pimentel Montaña, Juan Carlos	MVR	Mérida	Party-list
Velásquez Caraballo, David Nieves	UVE	Miranda	1st
Leonett Canales, Félix	UVE	Miranda	2nd
Rodríguez Miérez, Erick Josué	UVE	Miranda	3rd
Morejón Carrillo, Pedro Fritz	UVE	Miranda	3rd
Ramírez Pérez, Gabriela del Mar	UVE	Miranda	4th
Jiménez Rodríguez, Tulio Amado	UVE	Miranda	5th
Ramírez, Jesús Eduardo	UVE	Miranda	6th
Morales Gómez, Aurora Josefina	UVE	Miranda	7th
Álvarez Alfonzo, Carmen Trinidad	MVR	Miranda	Party-list
Machín Ferrer, Haydée Josefina	MVR	Miranda	Party-list
Bravo Quevedo, Iroshima Jennifer	MVR	Miranda	Party-list
Gamargo Lagonell, Luis Alfredo	MVR	Miranda	Party-list
Sanz, Rodolfo Eduardo	MVR	Miranda	Party-list
Cabello Palma, José Girardot	UVE	Monagas	1st
Villalba Sánchez, Manuel Enrique	UVE	Monagas	1st
Figueroa Chacín, Santana	UVE	Monagas	1st
Domínguez Valderrama, Jesús Enrique	UVE	Monagas	2nd
Díaz Salazar, Luis Ángel	MVR	Monagas	Party-list
Pérez Marcano, Marelis Josefina	MVR	Monagas	Party-list
Millán Marín, Juan José	MVR	Nueva Esparta	1st
García Ernández, Juan Salvador	MVR	Nueva Esparta	2nd
Pacheco Osorio, María del Rosario	UVE	Nueva Esparta	Party-list
Hernández Cedeño, Régulo Felipe	UVE	Nueva Esparta	Party-list
Hernández Parra, Porfirio de Jesús	UVE	Portuguesa	1st
Murga Rivas, Alfredo	UVE	Portuguesa	2nd
Rodríguez García, José Ernesto	UVE	Portuguesa	3rd
Lara Barrios, Zark Alfredo	UPPI	Portuguesa	4th
Torrealba Ojeda, Francisco Alejandro	MVR	Portuguesa	Party-list
Gutiérrez Briceño, Ricardo Antonio	MVR	Portuguesa	Party-list
Jiménez Álvarez, Bernardo José	UVE	Sucre	1st
García Font, Hermes Gregorio	UVE	Sucre	2nd
Rodríguez, José del Carmen	UVE	Sucre	3rd
Vallenilla Mendoza, Yaritza Margarita	UVE	Sucre	3rd
Marcano González, Erasmo Aristalco	MVR	Sucre	Party-list
Acuña Cedeño, Luis Augusto	MVR	Sucre	Party-list
García Jarpa, Julio Fernando	UVE	Táchira	1st
Mogollón de Guerrero, Santa Xiomara	UVE	Táchira	2nd
Tascón Gutiérrez, Luis	UVE	Táchira	3rd
Sanguino Cárdenas, José Ricardo	UVE	Táchira	4th
Lucena González, Édgar de Jesús	MVR	Táchira	Party-list
Pacheco Alviárez, Hernán	MVR	Táchira	Party-list
Varela Rangel, María Iris	MVR	Táchira	Party-list
Moreno Viloria, Julio Bernardo	UVE	Trujillo	1st
Pérez Cristancho, Oscar Francisco	UVE	Trujillo	2nd
Mendoza Jover, Juan José	UVE	Trujillo	3rd
Leal Briceño, Orestes Jesús	MVR	Trujillo	Party-list
Gil Rodríguez, Malaquías	MVR	Trujillo	Party-list
Vera Rojas, Oswaldo Emilio	UVE	Vargas	1st
Escalona Prado, Simón Enrique	UVE	Vargas	1st
De Freitas Rodríguez, José Guido	MVR	Vargas	Party-list
D´Amelio Cardiet, Tania	MVR	Vargas	Party-list
Gamarra Manzabel, Carlos Alberto	UVE	Yaracuy	1st
Sánchez López, Tomás Rafael	UVE	Yaracuy	2nd
Capella Mateo, Ricardo	AMANSA	Yaracuy	3rd
Álvarez, Braulio José	MVR	Yaracuy	Party-list
Hernández Wohnsiedler, Roberto Manuel	MVR	Yaracuy	Party-list
Ortega Ríos, Calixto Antonio	MVR	Zulia	1st
Ríos Becerra, Edis Alfonso	MVR	Zulia	1st
Cedeño Márquez, Jenny Elina	MVR	Zulia	1st
Briceño de Queipo, María de la Paz	MVR	Zulia	1st
Isea Bohórquez, Mario Ricardo	MVR	Zulia	2nd
Cabello, Lisandro José	MVR	Zulia	3rd
Saab Saab, Imad	MVR	Zulia	4th
Montiel, Arcadio José	MVR	Zulia	5th
Osorio López, Omar de Jesús	MVR	Zulia	6th
Peña Pineda, Eliseo Ramón	UVE	Zulia	Party-list
Palomares Verde, Énder de Jesús	UVE	Zulia	Party-list
López Almao, Francisco	UVE	Zulia	Party-list
Souki Rincón, Rafic	UVE	Zulia	Party-list
Quintero Valencia, Roberto Antonio	UVE	Zulia	Party-list
Cabeza Morales, Rodrigo Eduardo	UVE	Zulia	Party-list
Pocaterra de Oberto, Noelí	CONIVE	Indigenous	Western
Poyo Cascante, José Amado	CONIVE	Indigenous	Eastern
Maldonado Maldonado, Nicia Marina	FUNDACIDI	Indigenous	South

== Reactions ==
The opposition and international observers said that the abstention rate of about 75% demonstrated a deep distrust in the electoral process and the Chávez government.

After the elections, divisions emerged over the last minute withdrawal from the elections. Primero Justicia followers in particular regretted missing the opportunity to be seen as the major opposition after the withdrawal of Democratic Action and COPEI.

"The move surprised election officials, and some reports indicate that international observers were unhappy that the opposition had reneged on a commitment to participate in the elections if the digital fingerprint machines were not used." "In particular, the EU stated the CNE's decision to eliminate the digital fingerprint devices from the voting process was timely, effective, and constructive, and noted with surprise the opposition's withdrawal just four days before the election." The OAS criticized the withdrawal, saying that democracy requires an opposition committed to the electoral process.

The New York Times said that "The opposition decision appeared to be aimed at appealing to international support and discrediting Venezuela's government, which has strong approval ratings." José Miguel Vivanco, the Americas director of Human Rights Watch, was quoted as saying "It's really hard to understand what exactly the political opposition leadership has in mind. But certainly it is not going to help them to present themselves as victims that deserve solidarity from the international community. With these kinds of tactics I don't think they'll gain any ground."
