= Networks Party =

Venezuelan political party

Networks Party Partido Redes
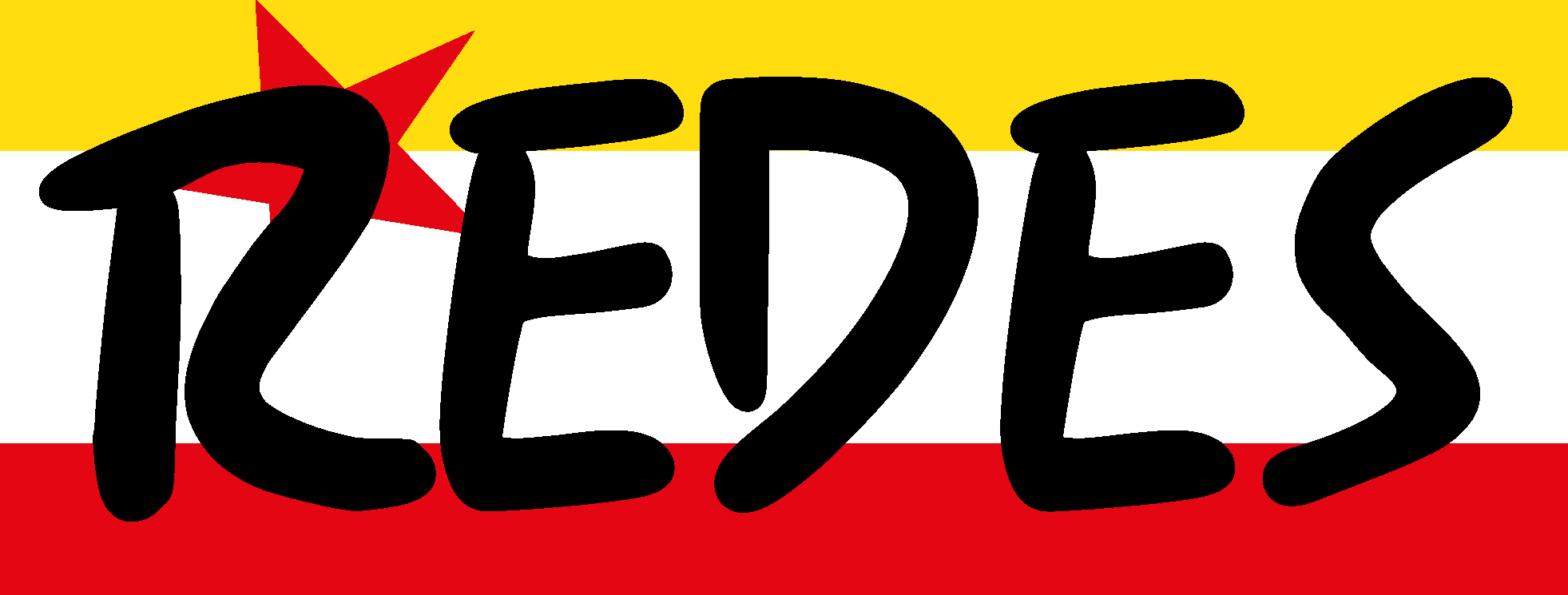
- Abbreviation: RP
- President: Juan Barreto
- Founded: 2012
- Headquarters: Caracas
- Ideology: Socialism; Chavismo
- Political position: Left-wing to far-left
- National affiliation: Democratic Alliance
- Colors: Yellow, Black, Red, White
- National Assembly: 0 / 277
- Governors: 0 / 23
- Mayors: 0 / 335
- Latin American Parliament: 0 / 12

Networks Party, officially REDES Party, is a Venezuelan political party, re-founded on August 20, 2012, by member of the United Socialist Party of Venezuela, Juan Barreto and Chavez leaders, collectives and workers. It was originally created in 2008 by Edita Pérez as an opposition party. On July 10, 2020, the party announced it would participate in the 2020 Venezuelan parliamentary election in alliance with Soluciones para Venezuela Party.
