= El Nacional (Venezuela) =

Venezuelan newspaper

- Type: Daily newspaper
- Format: Broadsheet
- Owner: Miguel Henrique Otero
- Publisher: C.A. Editorial El Nacional
- Founded: 3 August 1943
- Ceased publication: 14 December 2018 (print edition)
- Headquarters: Caracas, Venezuela
- Circulation: 20,000 (daily)
- Website: www.elnacional.com

El Nacional is a Venezuelan publishing company under the name C.A. Editorial El Nacional, most widely known for its El Nacional newspaper and website. It, along with Últimas Noticias and El Universal, are the most widely read and circulated daily national newspapers in the country. In 2010, it had an average of 83,000 papers distributed daily and 170,000 copies on weekends. It has been called Venezuela's newspaper of record.

Since the increase of censorship in Venezuela during the presidencies of Hugo Chávez and Nicolás Maduro, El Nacional has been described as one of the last independent newspapers in Venezuela. El Nacional published its final print edition on 14 December 2018 (after having been cut to five print editions per week back in August), joining in the dozens of anti-government newspapers in the nation that have stopped printing due to paper and toner shortages. It became an exclusively online newspaper after the date, and has been blocked by internet providers since early 2022.

== History ==
The first edition of El Nacional circulated on 3 August 1943, founded by Miguel Otero Silva in Caracas, with innovations such as the replacement of the editorial by the mancheta, the use of notorious headlines with large graphics and the classification of the entire newspaper by thematic areas. During the first year it circulated with a circulation of 10,000 copies per day and each edition consisted of two eight-page spreads, in standard format and seven columns.

The first headquarters of El Nacional was located between the corners of Marcos Parra and Pedrera, in downtown Caracas, from 1943 to 1951. It then moved its headquarters to Puerto Escondido from 1951 to 2007, for 56 years.

In 1961, an advertising boycott in opposition to the paper's leftist views (its then editor, Miguel Otero Silva, had been a member of the Communist Party of Venezuela) nearly forced the paper into bankruptcy.

The publication of the web site began in August 1995, being considered the first Venezuelan newspaper with a web site. The digital edition of El Nacional was inaugurated in 1996, characterized by including information different from that presented in the printed format of the newspaper. It was also the first Venezuelan newspaper to incorporate the figure of the pressombudsmannen or reader's ombudsman in 1998.

The publishing company C.A. El Nacional launched on the market a sensationalist-yellowish newspaper on 14 October 1996 with the intention to reach the popular strata, without obtaining good results. Due to its economic losses and after several changes, it printed its last issue on 8 April 2005. In 2007 it changed its headquarters, where it had been for 56 years, to the Main Avenue of Los Cortijos de Lourdes, along with new technological innovations.

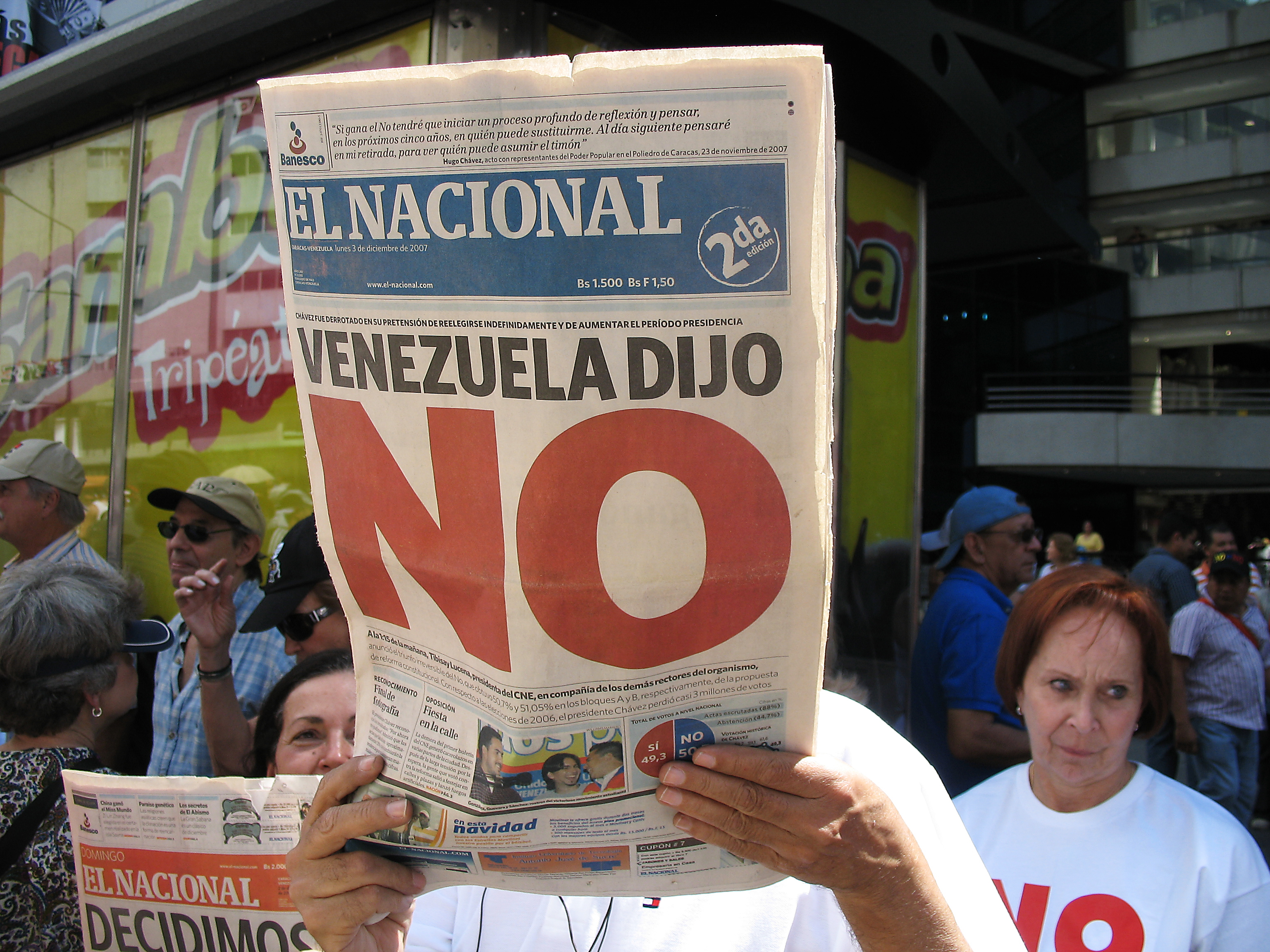
Front page of the newspaper the day after the success of the "No" vote in the 2007 Venezuelan constitutional referendum.

On 13 August 2010, El Nacional printed a photograph of corpses lying on stretchers and on the floor of the Caracas morgue to denounce the situation of crime in the country. As a result, police officers searched the newspaper headquarters and a court forbid El Nacional, along with Tal Cual, to publish any violent images or information. The court's decision was widely criticized by journalistic unions and opposition representatives as an attack on freedom of expression. In turn, El Nacional would go on to report the news with the word "censorship" in the spaces where news about crimes were usually published.

After this first attempt to launch a popular newspaper called El Propio, which had its first edition in 2012 as a newspaper for the CDE segment, its last publication took place in September 2015 due to the lack of paper that the printed media in Venezuela is going through, although the website of this newspaper would be visible until November 2016.

The newspaper, despite having various problems with the sale and supply of paper, manages to continue in rotation with a low number of pages and four pages. It has about 600 workers who are direct employees of the newspaper, while another 300 work as collaborators. It has also owned the magazines ¡HOLA! Venezuela and Todo en domingo (the latter of which is delivered together with the Sunday edition of the newspaper), a book publishing press and has two websites: Eme de mujer and ovaciondeportes.com.

In February 2022, the main Internet providers in Venezuela blocked access to the newspaper's website, days after the Supreme Tribunal of Justice ordered the newspaper headquarters to be handed over to Diosdado Cabello.

The newspaper is part of Grupo de Diarios América, to which other Latin American newspapers belong, such as El Tiempo (Colombia), El Mercurio (Chile) and La Nación (Argentina). El Nacional has been awarded the National Journalism Prize as a print media in 1959, 1977, 1981 and 2000.

The newspaper's first director was poet Antonio Arráiz (1903–1962). In the newspaper have contributed many of the most recognized Venezuelan writers. Arturo Úslar Pietri, one of the most important intellectuals of the country, wrote for more than fifty years in an opinion column in the newspaper. Former editors include José Ramón Medina and Miguel Otero Silva. The newspaper is directed by Chief Editorial Officer Miguel Henrique Otero, grandson of the founder, and by chief executive officer Manuel Sucre.

== Political stance and editorial opinion ==
El Nacional became quite critical of the second Carlos Andrés Pérez administration, joining opponents such as Attorney General Ramón Escovar Salom and journalist José Vicente Rangel, culminating in his impeachment in 1993. The newspaper would likewise be critical of Hugo Chávez government. In its 10 April 2002 editorial (the day before a failed right-wing coup d'état against President Chávez), it described Chávez as "a contumacious liar" and called upon the citizens that "today we have to go out to the streets today to show this knave who is in power that we Venezuelans are decent and dignified people". On the following day editorial, the newspaper reacted positively to the political crisis leading up to the coup saying that "this battle is coming to an end".

== Conflicts ==
On 14 April 2018, government-sponsored colectivos attacked the headquarters of El Nacional, kidnapping security workers and a janitor. Weeks after the Venezuelan presidential election in 2018, the newspaper had their Hypertext Transfer Protocol momentarily censored by the state-run CANTV from 7 June to 11 June 2018.

=== Censorship and seizure ===
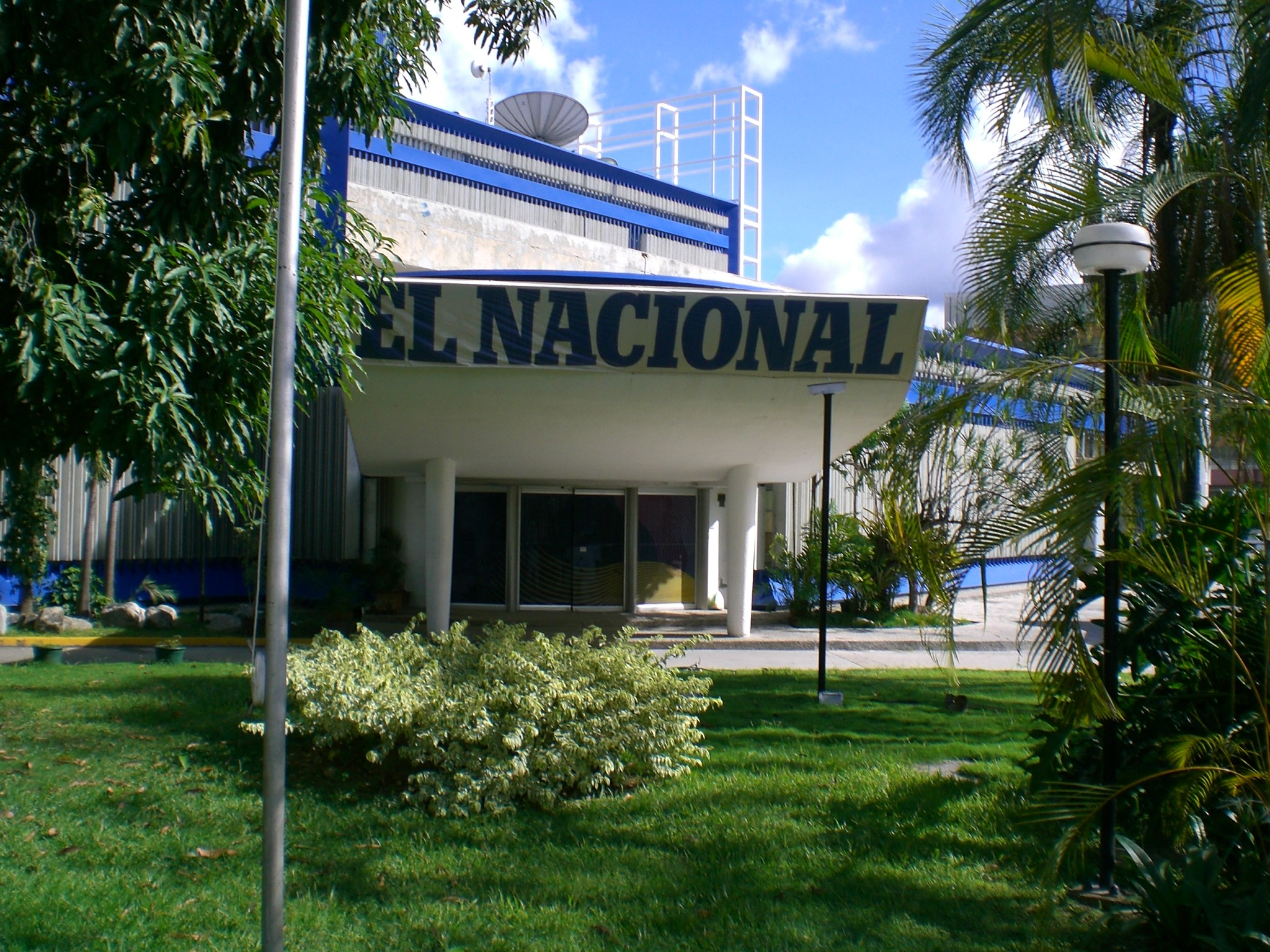
The former El Nacional building, which was seized to compensate Diosdado Cabello following a ruling by the Supreme Tribunal of Justice

The newspaper has had its website continuously censored in Venezuela, being described as one of the last independent media organizations in Venezuela. The newspaper faced legal issues after it republished reporting from Spanish newspaper ABC about Bolivarian government official Diosdado Cabello being investigated for alleged drug trafficking. After the government pressed charges against El Nacional, proposing the payment of a fine of 1 billion bolívares, Cabello replied to the newspaper's publishing of Venezuela's hyperinflation figures stating "if it was a billion bolívares, let's ... put five zeros next to it". Cabello targeted the newspaper even further, stating in late-September 2018 that he sought to acquire the newspaper's headquarters and convert it into a university.

In May 2021, the Supreme Tribunal of Justice ruled that El Nacional must pay 237,000 petros, or about $13,369,170 at the time of the decision, to Cabello and that the newspaper's headquarters would be seized to compensate him. In early 2022, the ownership of the former headquarter's was transferred to Cabello. Days after the transfer, the website's domain would be blocked by major internet providers in Venezuela.
