= Panic buying =

Unusual pattern of purchase

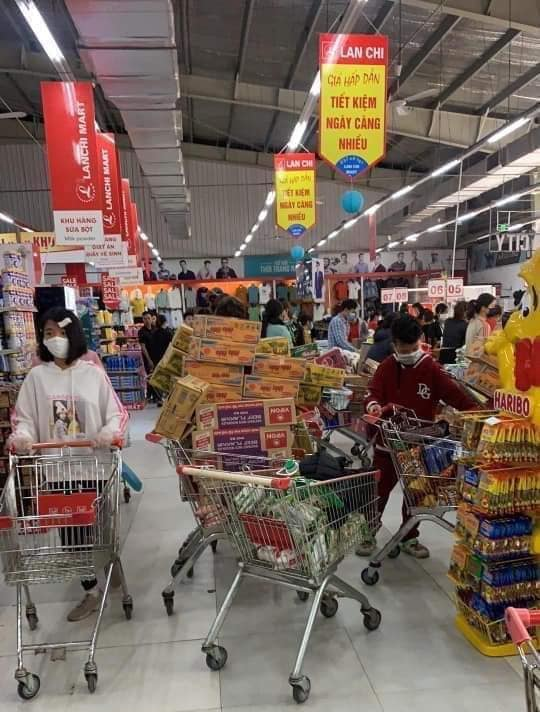
Customers bulk-buying goods during the COVID-19 pandemic in Vietnam

Panic buying (alternatively hyphenated as panic-buying; also known as panic purchasing) occurs when consumers buy unusually large amounts of a product in anticipation of, or after, a disaster or perceived disaster, or in anticipation of a large price increase or shortage.

Panic buying during various health crises is influenced by "(1) individuals' perception of the threat of a health crisis and scarcity of products; (2) fear of the unknown, which is caused by emotional pressure and uncertainty; (3) coping behaviour, which views panic buying as a venue to relieve anxiety and regain control over the crisis; and (4) social psychological factors, which account for the influence of the social network of an individual".

Panic buying is a type of herd behavior. It is of interest in consumer behavior theory, the broad field of economic study dealing with explanations for "collective action such as fads and fashions, stock market movements, runs on nondurable goods, buying sprees, hoarding, and banking panics".

Panic buying can lead to genuine shortages regardless of whether the risk of a shortage is real or perceived without merit; the latter scenario is an example of self-fulfilling prophecy.

== Examples ==
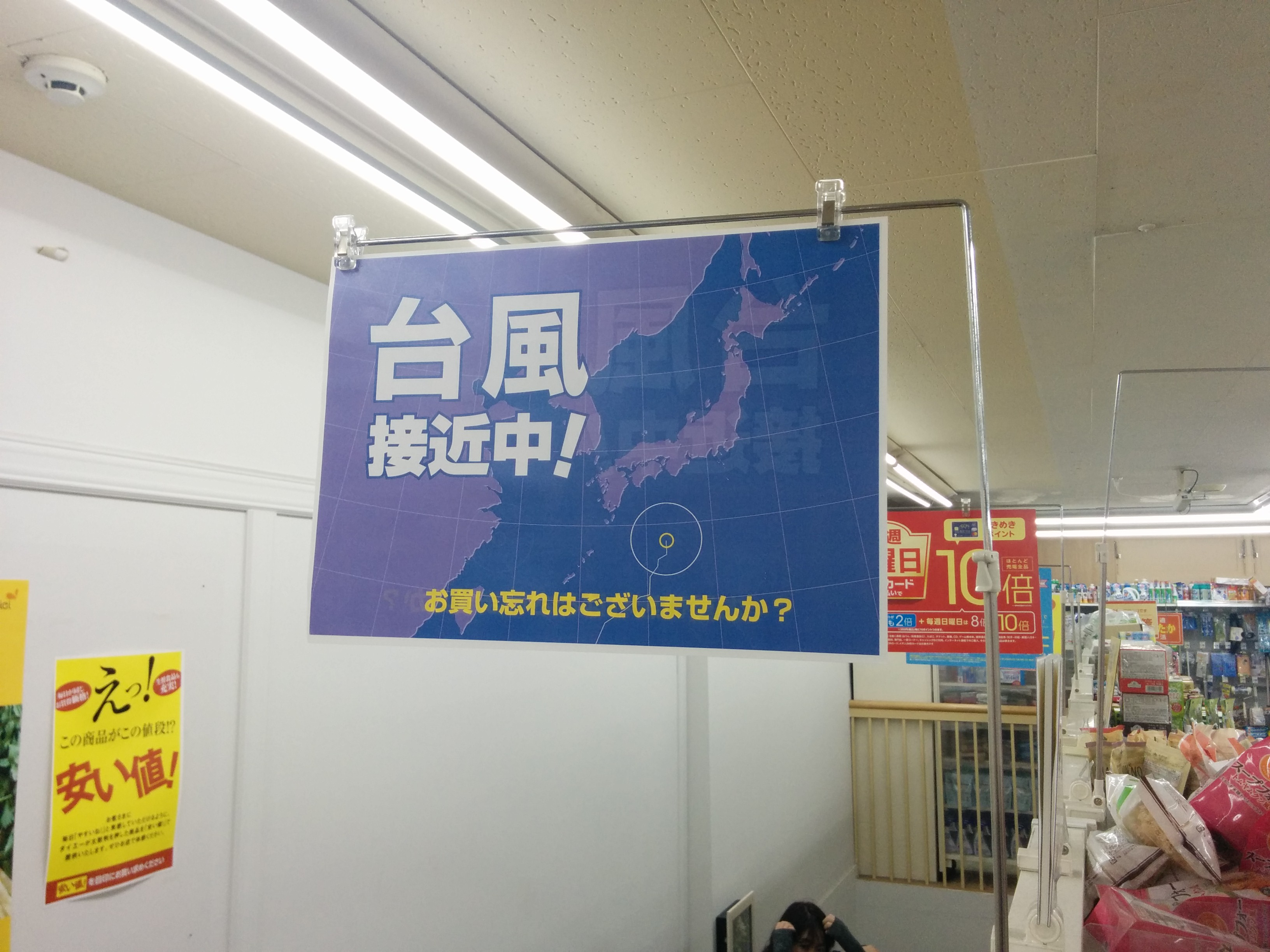
Advertisement using panic as a selling argument. The ad warns about an upcoming typhoon and asks customers whether they have bought everything.

Panic buying occurred before, during, or following:

- The First (1914–1918) and Second World Wars (1939–1945).
- The 1918–1919 global influenza pandemic ("Spanish flu") led to the panic buying of quinine and other remedies for influenza and its symptoms from pharmacists and doctors' surgeries. Sales of Vicks VapoRub increased from $900,000 to $2.9 million in a year.
- In the First Austrian Republic in 1922, hyperinflation and the rapid depreciation of the Austrian krone led to panic buying and food hoarding, which continued until a rescue backed by the League of Nations prevented an economic collapse.
- Bengal famine of 1943.
- 1962 Cuban Missile Crisis led to panic buying of canned foods in the United States.
- The 1973 toilet paper panic in the United States.
- The 1979 oil crisis led to panic buying of oil, led by Japan.
- The 1985 arrival of New Coke led many consumers to panic buy the original Coke.
- Year 2000 problem – food.
- 2001 – panic buying of metals, gold and oil on international commodity markets following the September 11 attacks.
- Between January and February 2003, during the SARS outbreak, several rounds of panic buying of various products (including salt, rice, vinegar, vegetable oil, antibiotics, face masks, and traditional Chinese medicine) took place in the Chinese province of Guangdong and in neighboring areas such as Hainan and Hong Kong.
- 2000 and 2005 UK fuel protests.
- 2005 Jilin chemical plant explosions – water, food.
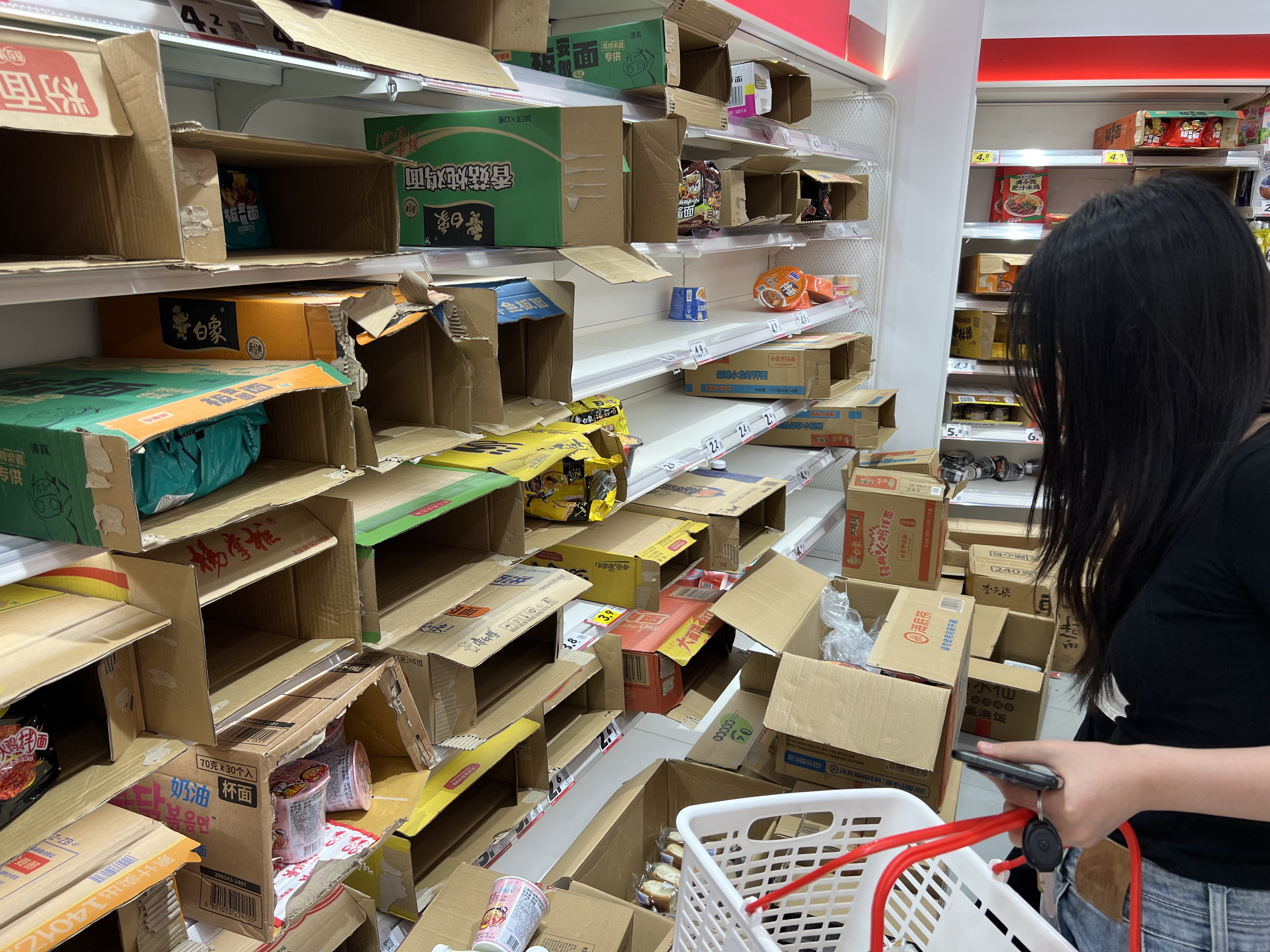
- Panic buying at a snack shop in Hangzhou due to Typhoon Bavi
  2008–2016 United States ammunition shortage – panic buying by gun owners who feared tougher gun control laws under President Barack Obama was one cause of ammunition shortages.
- In September 2013 during the Venezuelan economic crisis, the Venezuelan government temporarily took over the Aragua-based Paper Manufacturing Company toilet paper plant to manage the "production, marketing and distribution" of toilet paper following months of depleted stocks of basic goods—including toilet paper—and foodstuffs, such as rice and cooking oil. Blame for the shortages was placed on "ill-conceived government policies such as price controls on basic goods and tight restrictions on foreign currency" and hoarding.
- Dakazo – Amid decreased support before the 2013 Venezuelan municipal elections, Venezuelan president Nicolás Maduro announced the military occupation of stores on 8 November 2013, proclaiming "Leave nothing on the shelves!" The announcement of lowered prices sparked looting in multiple cities across Venezuela. By the end of the Dakazo, many Venezuelan stores were left empty of their goods. A year later in November 2014, some stores still remained empty following the Dakazo.
- In February 2018, in the background of pulp prices rising, the Taiwanese hypermarket chain RT-Mart released a press release that the hypermarket is going to raise prices of toilet paper by 10% ~ 30%, causing a panic buying of toilet paper. The Fair Trade Commission later confirmed that the press release was a "improper marketing" (不當行銷) that misled the public and fined RT-Mart with 3.5 million TWD.
- In May 2021, panic buying exacerbated fuel shortages during the Colonial Pipeline ransomware attack in the Southeastern United States.
- In September 2021, panic buying of petrol led to empty fuel filling stations across the United Kingdom. A lack of tanker drivers was blamed, with Brexit being the primary cause according to most Road Haulage Association respondents.
- In November 2021, panic buying of groceries took place in the British Columbia Interior and Fraser Valley owing to the impacts of the 2021 Pacific Northwest floods.
- On March 3, 2022, panic buying of IKEA kit furniture and home appliances occurred in Russia due to the company's decision to close its 17 Russian stores in light of the 2022 Russian invasion of Ukraine. Extensive queues were reported in IKEA's Moscow and Saint Petersburg stores, and customers attempted to enter from the exit doors when entrance doors were closed.
- In May 2023, the Malaysian states of Penang and Kedah experienced panic buying of bottled water due to an interruption in tap water supply lasting less than 24 hours.
- In August 2023, after the discharge of radioactive water of the Fukushima Daiichi Nuclear Power Plant, people in China began panic buying salt and radiation detectors because of the public anxiety towards the radioactive water released. Consumers in South Korea also began hoarding salt and seafood.
- In August 2024, Japanese consumers began panic buying rice due to supply shortages, megaquake warnings, and typhoons.
- In October 2024, American consumers purchased large quantities of toilet paper and paper towels during the 2024 United States port strike, despite these products not being among those affected by labor action. At the end of the same month, due to the Spanish floods, bottled water and other products ran out in the supermarkets Mercadona and Consum, in Valencia.
- In December 2024, after Yoon Suk Yeol, the president of South Korea, declared martial law, South Korean consumers began panic buying food, water, and other essential goods.
- On 28 April 2025, Spaniards began panic buying radio receivers, bottled water, non-perishable food, etc. due to 2025 Iberian Peninsula power outage. Some supermarkets closed to the public.

=== COVID-19 pandemic ===
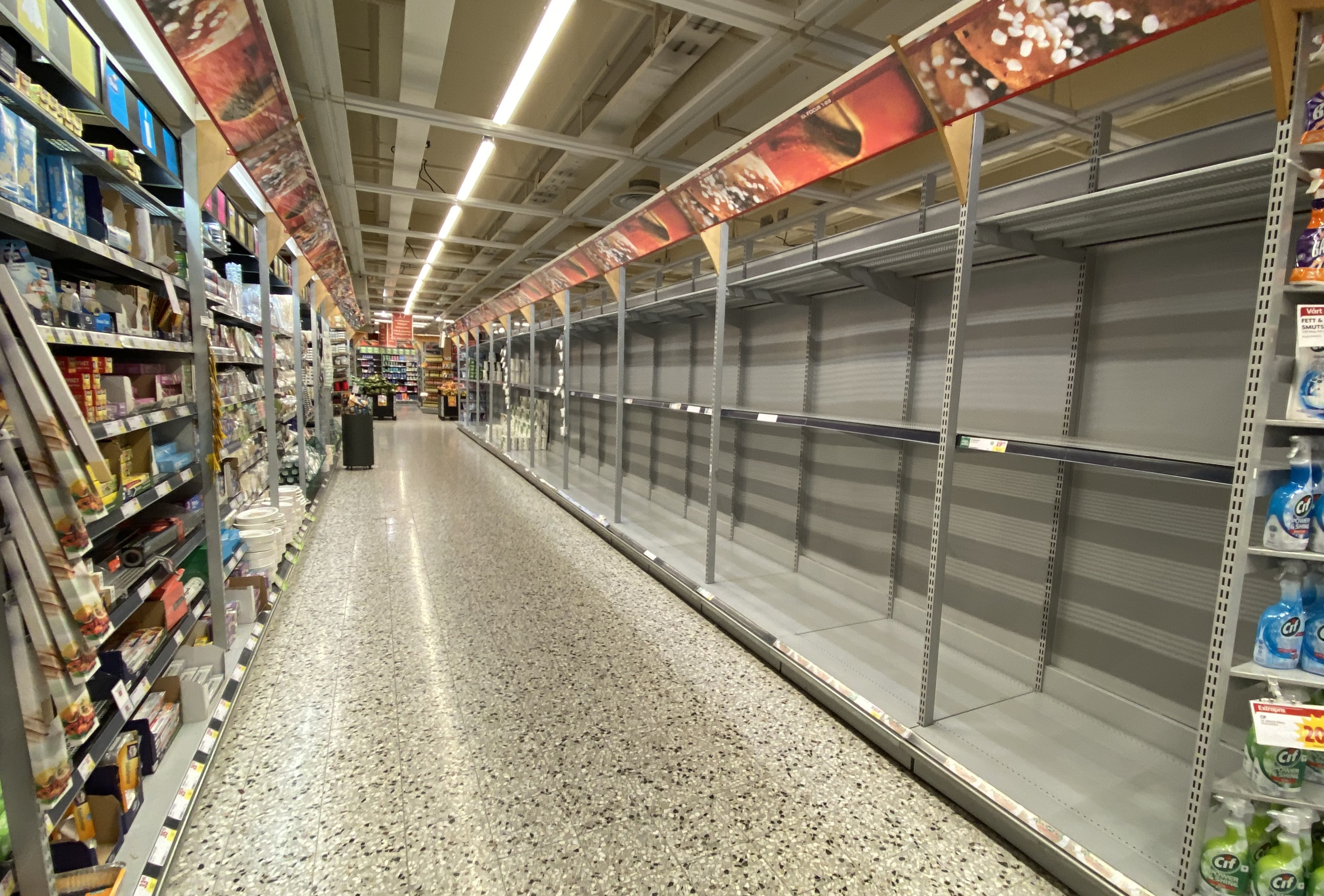
Aftermath of selective panic buying of toilet paper during the COVID-19 pandemic

Panic buying became a major international phenomenon between February and March 2020 during the early onset of the COVID-19 pandemic, and continued in smaller, more localized waves throughout during sporadic lockdowns across the world. Stores around the world were depleted of items such as face masks, food, bottled water, milk, toilet paper, hand sanitizer, rubbing alcohol, antibacterial wipes and painkillers. As a result, many retailers rationed the sale of these items.

Online retailers such as eBay and Amazon began to pull certain items listed for sale by third parties such as toilet paper, face masks, pasta, canned vegetables, hand sanitizer and antibacterial wipes over price gouging concerns. As a result, Amazon restricted the sale of these items and others (such as thermometers and ventilators) to healthcare professionals and government agencies. Additionally, panic renting of self-storage units took place during the onset of the pandemic.

The massive buyouts of toilet paper caused bewilderment and confusion from the public. Images of empty shelves of toilet paper were shared on social media in many countries around the world, e.g. Australia, United States, the United Kingdom, Canada, Singapore, Hong Kong and Japan. In Australia, two women were charged over a physical altercation over toilet paper at a supermarket. The severity of the panic buying drew criticism; particularly from Prime Minister of Australia Scott Morrison, calling for Australians to "stop it".

Research on this specific social phenomenon of toilet paper hoarding suggested that social media had played a crucial role in stimulating mass-anxiety and panic. Social media research found that many people posting about toilet paper panic buying were negative, either expressing anger or frustration over the frantic situation. This high amount of negative viral posts could act as an emotional trigger of anxiety and panic, spontaneously spreading fear and fueling psychological reactions in midst of the crisis. It may have triggered a snowball effect in the public, encouraged by the images and videos of empty shelves and people fighting over toilet rolls.

== Gallery ==
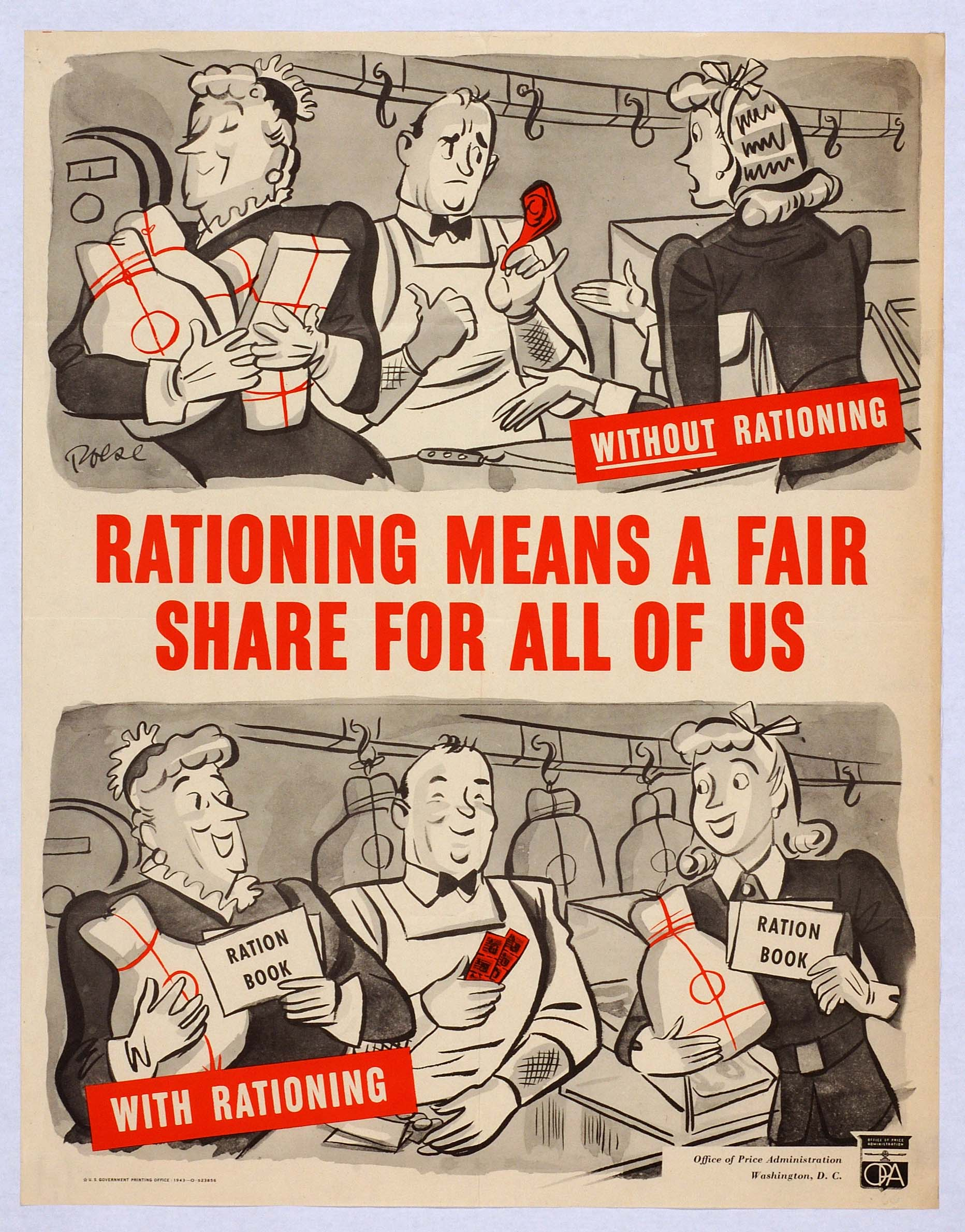
A United States propaganda poster in World War II showing the effects of panic buying goods

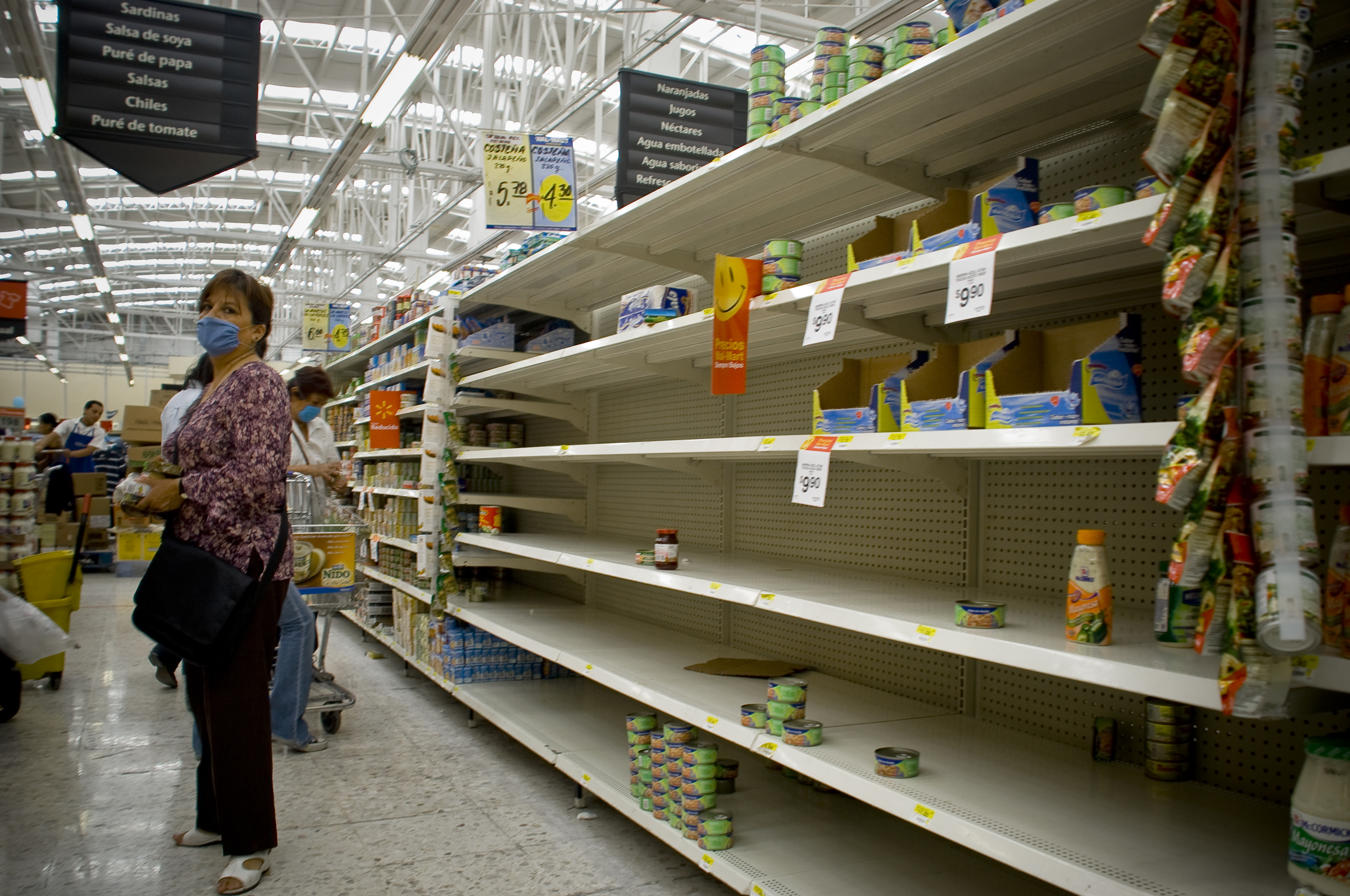
Shoppers at a Walmart in Mexico City panic buying canned food during the 2009 flu pandemic

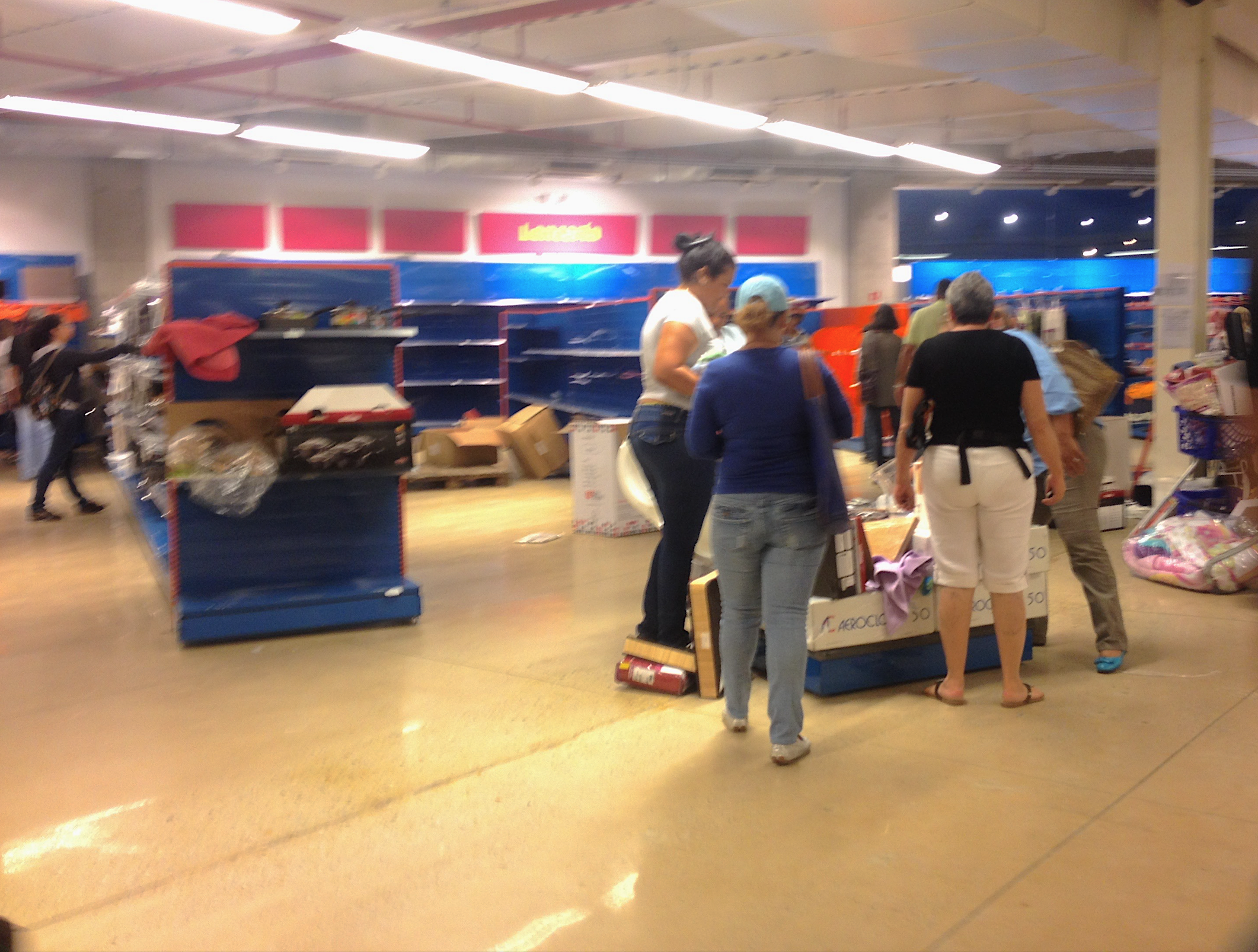
Venezuelans grabbing for items during the Dakazo, an event of the crisis in Venezuela

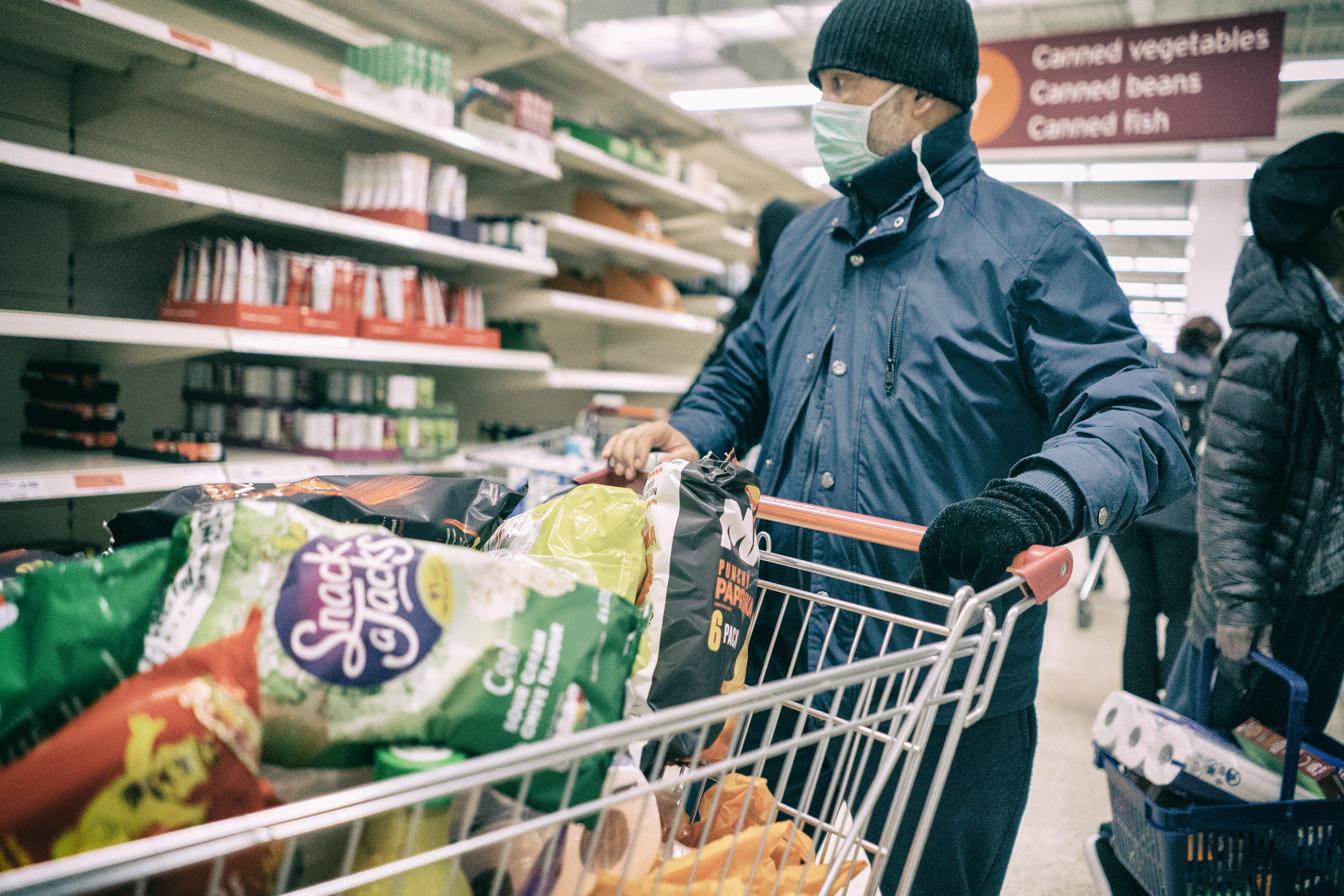
Shoppers in London panic buying canned food and toilet paper during the COVID-19 pandemic

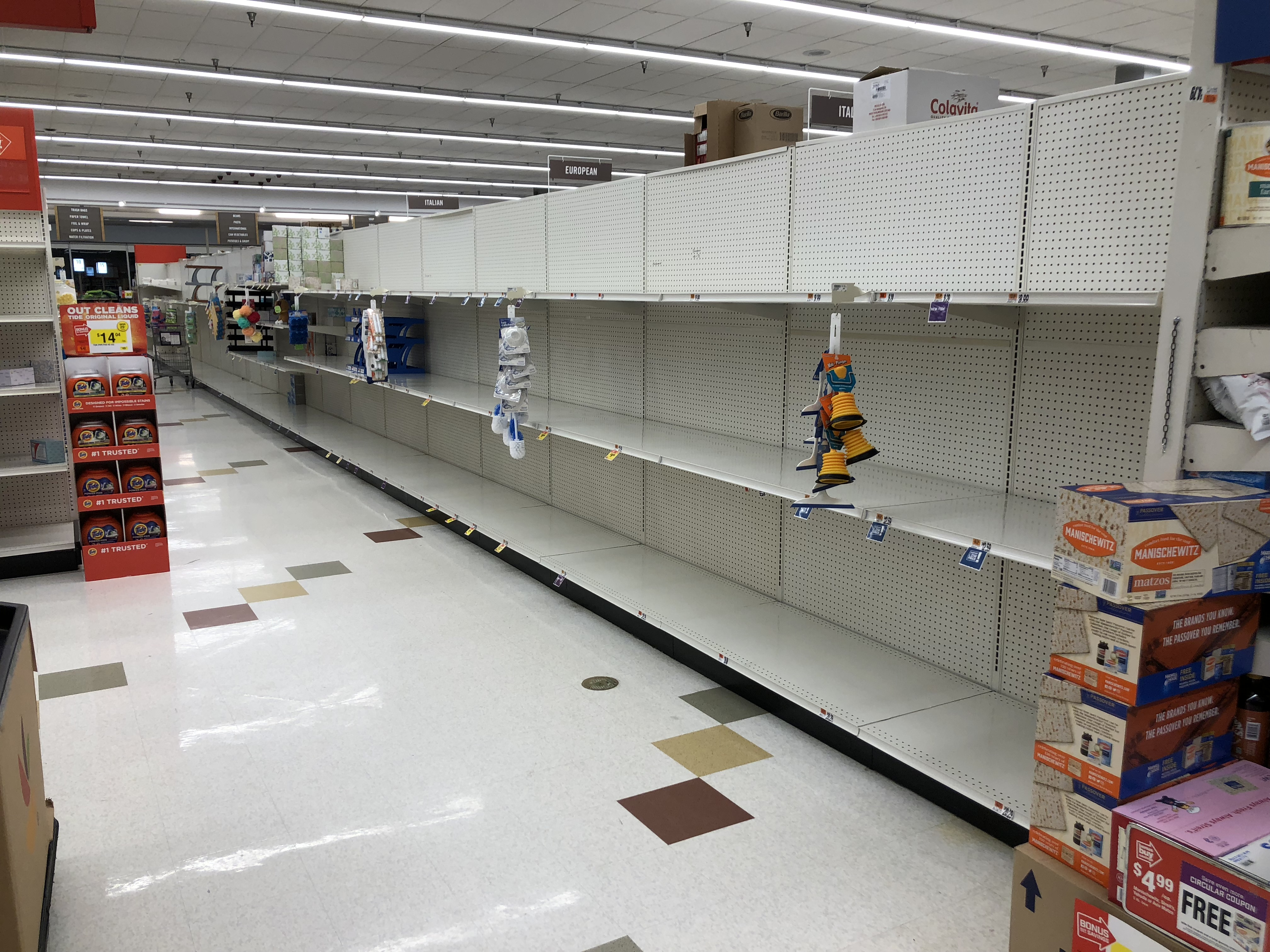
Panic buying at the Giant supermarket in Franklin Farm, Virginia, during the COVID-19 pandemic in March 2020

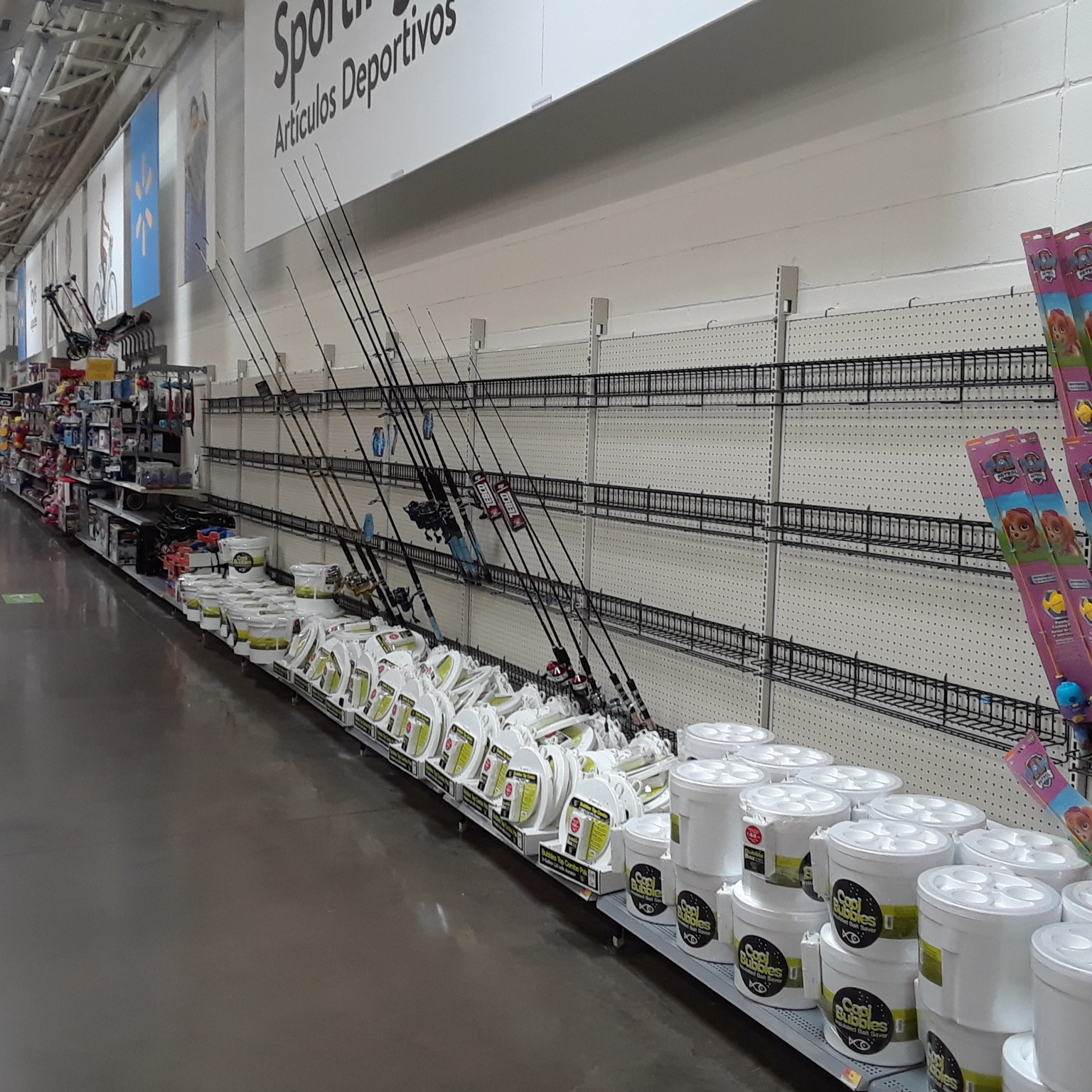
Fishing-rod panic buying in Corpus Christi, Texas, during the COVID-19 pandemic

== See also ==
- Panic selling
- Revenge buying
- Stock market crash
- Economic bubble
- Mass hysteria
- Hoarding
- Panic room
