= Dakazo =

Venezuelan government actions to force lowered retail prices

- Part of Crisis in Venezuela
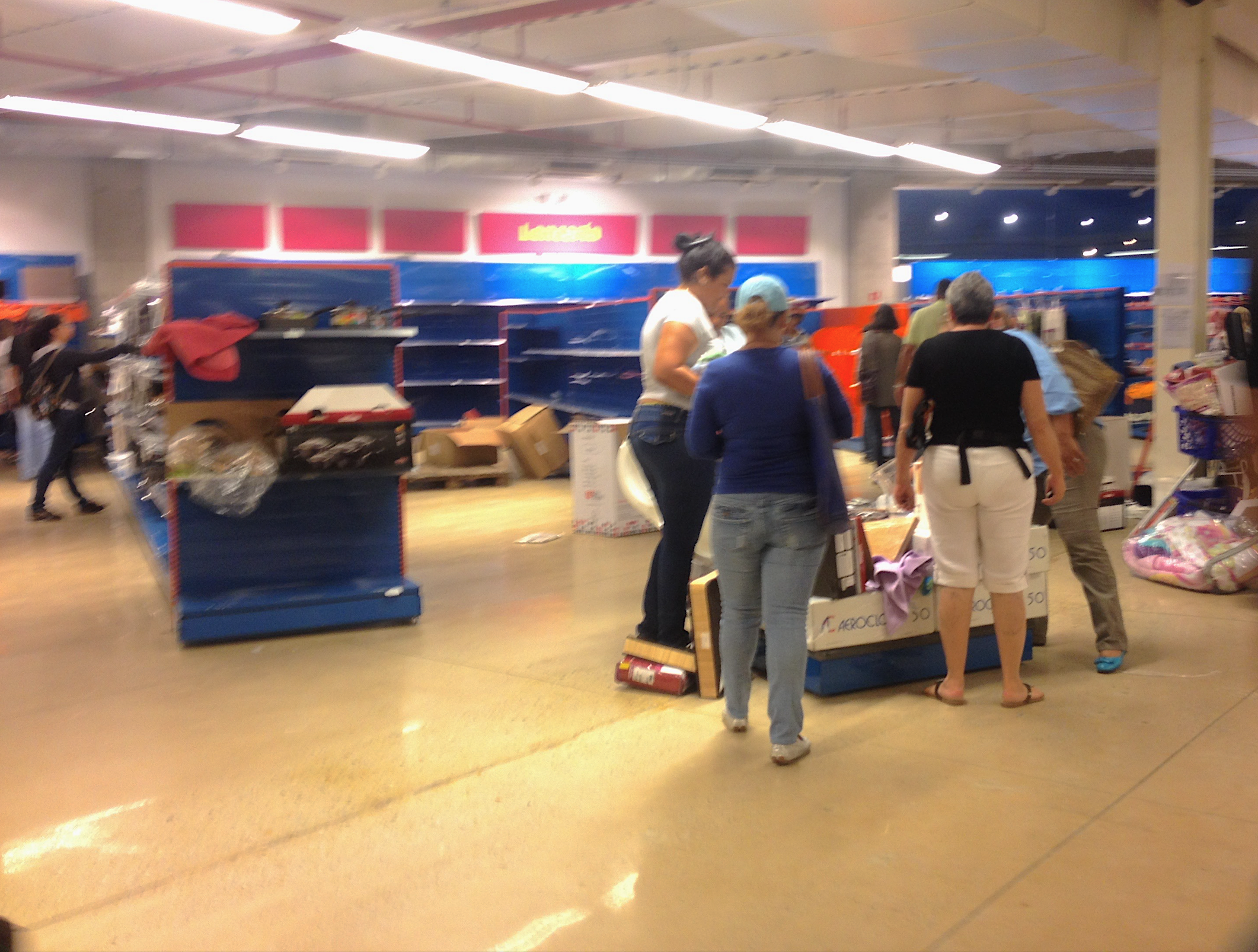
- People grabbing for items in a Venezuelan store
- Date: November 2013 – December 2013
- Location: Venezuela
- Outcome: Looting of stores; Shortages of products in appliance stores

Dakazo refers to a set of actions taken by the Venezuelan government forcing consumer electronic retail stores, with Daka being the most prominent, to sell products at much lower prices on 8 November 2013, weeks before municipal elections. The forced Daka price changes helped Venezuela's ruling party, PSUV, win in some of the municipal elections, though the massive sale of goods caused further shortages in the months following the initiative.

== Etymology ==
The word Dakazo is the name of the retail store, Daka, plus the -azo suffix, which denotes a violent knock. Its translation could therefore be "the Daka smash". (see Spanish nouns: Other suffixes.)

Following the initial event in 2013, similar occurrences of forced price cuts upon Venezuelan retail stores by the Venezuelan government were referred to as Dakazos due to the similarity of the situations.

== Background ==
In 2013, Venezuela was facing multiple economic difficulties including shortages, high inflation and a depreciating currency. Currency controls implemented by the Venezuelan government made it difficult for importers forcing them to adopt a black market currency exchange rate with higher prices and created corruption among sellers and government officials.

== Government occupation of Daka ==
I have immediately ordered the occupation of the network (Daka) and bring products to sell people a fair price. Leave nothing on the shelves!

— President Nicolás Maduro

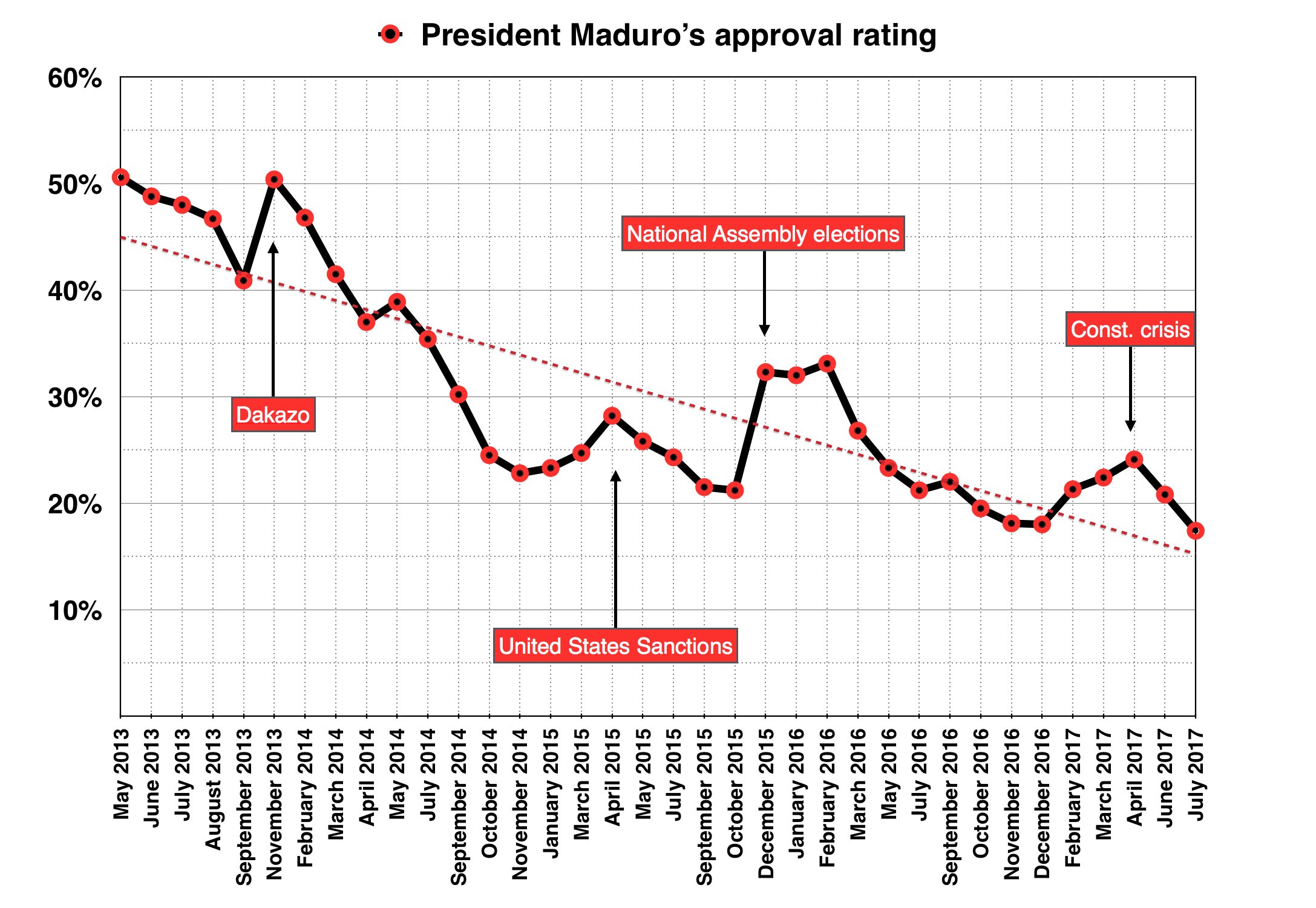
Approval rating of President Nicolás Maduro increased nearly 10 percentage points from September to November 2013. Sources: Datanálisis

Weeks before municipal elections and a month before Christmas, President Nicolás Maduro, who faced a possible presidential referendum if his party did not win in the elections and had lost popularity among Venezuelans in the preceding months, forced Daka to sell its products at severely lowered prices on 8 November 2013. In a speech, President Maduro criticized capitalism and claimed that Daka had raised prices on goods over 1000%. Troops were ordered to take control of the five Daka retail stores in Venezuela and enforce lowered prices, though at some stores, pro-government groups called colectivos arrived before authorities and forced Daka employees to sell goods at lower prices as well.

At the main store in Caracas, troops filed hundreds of people in lines where they waited for hours to purchase items one person at a time. Head of the Superior Organ for the Defense of the Economy, Hebert García Plaza, later promised that "all the Venezuelan people will have the capacity to obtain a plasma television and a refrigerator of the latest generation". The announcement of lowered prices sparked looting in multiple cities across Venezuela. Of the multiple cities where looting occurred, dozens of people were seen running from a Daka store in Valencia with flat-screen TVs and boxes. In the Carabobo municipality of Caracas, doors were ripped off of the Daka store and its windows were broken. Looters were also seen breaking into warehouses of various stores to steal goods.

Days later on 10 November 2013, multiple managers of Daka, JVG and Krash were arrested by SEBIN and were prosecuted on charges of unjustified price increases after importing products with dollars obtained at the official exchange rate of 6.3 bolivars. García Plaza then "led a wave of inspections ... on other stores in the industry, also to retailers of clothes, shoes and toys. ... merchants were forced to dramatically reduce the price of their products, which generated massive purchases that significantly reduced store stock". Two weeks later, President Maduro reported that of 400 companies inspected, only 5 were offering "fair prices". Venezuelans began to line up outside of stores throughout the day and night, with some people selling their places in line to others. Banks began to raise their credit card limits and soon cities throughout Venezuela reported other acts of looting. By the end of the Dakazo, many Venezuelan stores were left empty of their goods.

== Outcome ==
Days after the beginning of the Dakazo, President Maduro stated that the action taken by the government would result in a -15% inflation rate for the month of November and a 50% inflation rate in December, though critics disagreed candidly with President Maduro's statements. One month later in late December 2013, the Venezuelan government released data showing that inflation had in fact increased 4.8% in November and the inflation rate for December was 56.2%, proving according to Reuters that President Maduro's plan did not work. However, the measures taken by President Maduro helped his party, PSUV, win the majority of votes in the 2013 Venezuelan municipal elections.

=== Effect on business and shortages ===
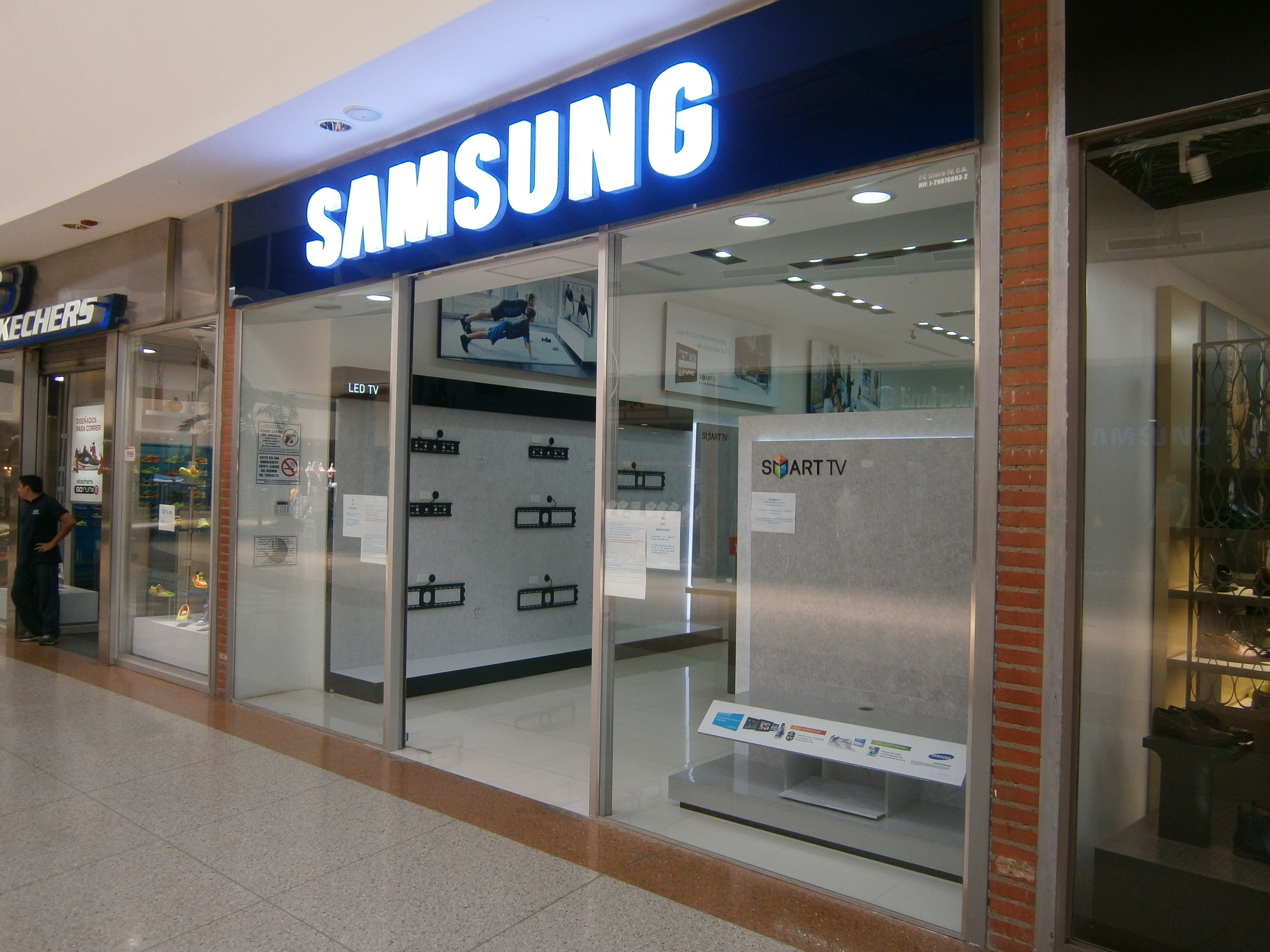
An empty Samsung store in Venezuela with multiple notices on its windows months after the Dakazo.

Multiple economists warned that the actions taken by the government during the Dakazo would end up "cannibalizing" the economy, causing even more shortages since importing additional goods into Venezuela following the massive sale of products would be difficult for vendors due to currency controls and the black market exchange rate. By December 2013, shelves were empty in Daka stores, though Hebert García Plaza, then High Authority for the Defence of Economy, stated that the stock of goods would return to normalcy soon. However, one year later in November 2014, some Daka stores still remained empty following the Dakazo. At a Daka store in the Bello Monte municipality of Caracas, only plates, a small oven, a pot, a blender and toaster remained one year after the Dakazo, with the manager stating that Daka would receive its first restock on 15 November 2014, over a year after the forced sale of goods. Multiple business leaders denounced the actions of the Venezuelan government, demanding respect for private property and to work with business instead of taking actions against them.

=== Other Dakazos ===
Years after the Dakazo, merchants in Venezuela still feared that the Bolivarian government would still attempt to force lower prices upon them near the Christmas season. Due to the similarities to the original event, subsequent events of forced price cuts by the Bolivarian government were also referred to as Dakazos.

In late October 2016, analysts believed that a second Dakazo was going to occur since products that had not been in Venezuela for a long period were suddenly imported into the country. A little over a month later in early December 2016 during the Christmas season, the Bolivarian government began to force merchants to lower their prices again, with Superintendent William Contreras ordering "Do not review anything, lower prices".

== See also ==
- Economic policy of the Nicolás Maduro government
- Economy of Venezuela
