= Protocol for the reconstruction of Hungary =

1924 multilateral agreement

The Protocol for the Reconstruction of Hungary was an agreement concluded on 14 March 1924 between the government of Hungary and the governments of Great Britain, France, Italy, Romania, Yugoslavia and Czechoslovakia, providing for a gradual reconstruction of the Hungarian economy under League of Nations supervision.

== Terms ==
The Protocol consisted of two declarations, both issued on the same day. In declaration No. 1, the signatory parties undertook not to violate Hungarian territorial or economic independence, and the Hungarian government undertook not to violate the military clauses of the Treaty of Trianon. Declaration No. 2 specified the steps to be taken to reconstruct the Hungarian economy, which included adjustment of expenditure in a way that would balance the budget by June 30, 1926.

== See also ==
- Protocol for the reconstruction of Austria

== Sources ==
- Text of declaration No. 1 of the protocol
- Text of declaration No. 2 of the protocol
