= Revenge buying =

Indulgent shopping after restrictions

Revenge buying (also known as revenge shopping or revenge spending) refers to a sudden surge in the purchase of consumer goods after people are denied the opportunity to shop for extended periods of time. The revenge buying mechanism is thought to have evolved as a reaction to the frustration and psychological discomfort caused by restrictions in the freedom of movement and commerce. Unlike panic buying, revenge buying appears to involve the purchase of superfluous goods, such as bags and clothing, as well as decorative objects such as gems and jewellery. The industries revolving around the production of these objects, a major source of revenue for the retail sector, saw huge losses during the lockdowns induced by the COVID-19 pandemic.

Revenge buying began in China initially, and the trends were seen across the globe when economies reopened. The United States and Europe followed the same kind of enthusiasm in consumers, and luxury brands posted remarkable growth compared to during COVID lockdowns.

== Examples ==
In China, the Cultural Revolution during the 1960s and COVID-19 crisis nearly sixty years later are examples of collective traumas that resulted in revenge buying. The phenomenon was first observed in the 1980s, where it was termed baofuxing xiaofei (Chinese: 报复性消费). Following China's 1978 reform and opening up, this term describes the sudden demand for foreign-brand goods. It reoccurred in China in April 2020, when the lockdown was mostly lifted and markets reopened. At that time, the French luxury brand Hermès made US$2.7 million in sales in a single day.

=== COVID-19 pandemic ===
The economic impact of the COVID-19 pandemic was devastating to many global retail businesses. Many stores and shopping centers were forced to close for months because stay-at-home restrictions meant that consumers could not travel freely. According to a March 2020 article in Business Insider, retail sales dropped 20.5 percent after the pandemic hit China—a percentage not seen since the 2008 financial crisis.

The apparel industry suffered greatly during the pandemic; several notable retailers, including J. Crew, Neiman Marcus, J.C. Penney, Brooks Brothers, Ascena Retail Group, Debenhams, Arcadia Group, GNC, and Lord & Taylor, filed for bankruptcy.

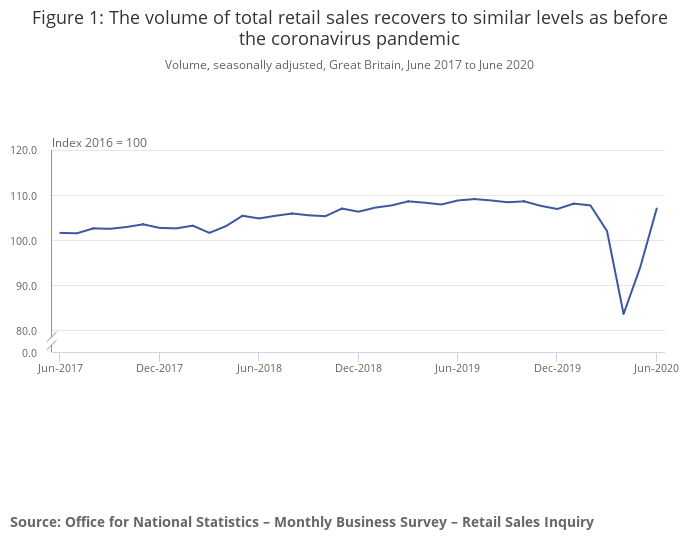
According to the UK Office for National Statistics, the volume of total retail sales recovered to similar levels as before the COVID-19 pandemic.

China was the first country hit by the COVID-19 pandemic; by the summer 2020, it had successfully contained community transmission and thereafter lifted significant restrictions. The term revenge buying entered popular consciousness with the immediate economic recovery of the French fashion company Hermès, which recorded $2.7 million in sales at its flagship store in Guangzhou, China, on the day it reopened in April 2020, setting a record for most single-day shopping at any luxury outlet in China. In addition to Hermès, lines piled up outside Apple, Gucci, and Lancôme stores. A similar instance of revenge buying occurred in India following the relaxation of Omicron-related restrictions in March 2022. A similar level of consumer enthusiasm was observed by the press in the United States and Europe after their economies mostly reopened in April 2021.

== Explanation ==
According to sociologists, compulsive and impulsive buying behaviors, such as panic buying and revenge buying, are coping mechanisms that relieve negative feelings.

While revenge buying was first observed in China, it has since been observed in other countries. When physical stores reopened after the initial COVID lockdown, sales increased, particularly in luxury product stores. According to researchers for the International Journal of Social Psychiatry, the purchase of luxury goods acts as a means for consumers to repress unpleasant emotions. Reactance theory is another analytical method sociologists use to gain a deeper understanding of revenge-buying behavior; this theory posits that when a threat or hindrance to a person's behavioral freedom makes them upset, the person will try to regain the threatened autonomy.

== See also ==
- Economic bubble
- Panic selling
- Consumer behaviour
- 2021 global inflation surge
