= Spanish nouns =

Grammatical feature of Spanish

The Spanish language has nouns that express concrete objects, groups and classes of objects, qualities, feelings and other abstractions. All nouns have a conventional grammatical gender. Countable nouns inflect for number (singular and plural). However, the division between uncountable and countable nouns is more ambiguous than in English.

== Gender ==
Spanish nouns belong to either the masculine or the feminine grammatical gender. Gender, in this case, refers to a grammatical system and is not necessarily connected with biological sex or gender. For example, la mesa 'table' is feminine despite there being nothing inherently feminine about tables. Adjectives and determiners agree in gender with their associated nouns. In a clause like las mesas grandes son más bonitas 'large tables are nicer', for instance, all adjectives and determiners associated with the head noun (mesas) must agree with it in gender. Mesas is feminine, so the article must be feminine too; thus, las is used instead of los. The two adjectives, whether next to the noun or after the verb, have to agree with the noun as well. Grande 'large' is invariable for gender, so it just takes a plural marker (grandes). Bonito 'nice' can be marked for both gender and number, so bonitas is used with mesas.

The question of whether -o, -a, and similar morphemes are inflectional gender morphemes is a matter of disagreement in grammars of Spanish. For terms like el hijo 'son' and la hija 'daughter', the terms seem to consist of a root like hij- and a suffix -o or-a that determines the noun's gender. But for terms like el escritor 'the (male) writer' and la escritora 'the (female) writer', only the feminine form seems to have an inflectional gender morpheme. Some grammars assume a null gender morpheme for the masculine forms of such terms (e.g., escritor-Ø/escritora) while others argue that such assumptions rely only on theoretical arguments and lack empirical grounds.

The masculine gender is inclusive and is used for plural forms of groups of both genders. For example, los niños, grammatically masculine, may mean 'the children' or 'the boys'. The feminine gender is exclusive in the plural: las niñas 'the girls' refers only to girls, not children of both biological sexes or genders. However, some proponents of nonsexist language reform promote alternative forms with desdoblamiento, such as los niños y las niñas or las niñas y los niños.

The manner in which gender is assigned to nouns in Spanish works differently depending on which of two classes the noun belongs to. One class includes certain nouns referring to humans and animals, and the other class consists of nouns not in the first class.

=== Gender of certain nouns referring to humans and animals ===
Though the gender of most Spanish nouns is assigned arbitrarily, the gender of certain nouns referring to humans and animals are determined by biological sex and gender. For this class of nouns, the masculine and feminine often take different forms. By convention, the masculine form is treated as the lemma (that is, the form listed in dictionaries) and the feminine form as the marked form. For nouns of this class with the masculine form ending in -o, the feminine form typically replaces the -o with -a. For example, el abuelo 'grandfather' becomes la abuela 'grandmother'. Exceptionally, some nouns of this class with the masculine form ending in -o lack a distinct feminine form. In these cases, the gender of the noun is marked only by the determiners or adjectives that agree with it. For instance, the feminine form of el soldado 'the (male) soldier' is la soldado 'the (female) soldier', with only the gender of the article (el/la) distinguishing them in this case. For nouns of this class with the masculine form ending in -or, -ón, -ín, -és, and -án, the feminine form adds an -a. For example, el doctor 'the (male) doctor' becomes la doctora 'the (female) doctor'. A few nouns ending in -e also take -a in the feminine such as el jefe and la jefa 'boss' and el presidente and la presidenta 'president'.

The remaining nouns in this class do not typically have distinct feminine forms, but the gender of the determiners or adjectives that agree with them still correspond to biological sex or gender. For instance, el artista refers to an artist who is male while la artista refers to an artist who is female. These nouns are called common gender nouns. Other examples include el/la periodista 'journalist', el/la testigo 'witness', and el/la estudiante 'student'.

For some nouns in this class called heteronyms (heterónimos), the masculine and feminine forms are distinct lemmas. Much as English has the distinct lemmas bull and cow, for example, Spanish has the distinct forms el toro 'bull' and la vaca 'cow'. For these nouns, the masculine plural form is typically used for groups containing both male and female members. A group containing both actors (los actores) and actresses (las actrices), for instance, is referred to as los actores 'actors'. Exceptionally, an animal species may be represented by the feminine lemma rather than the masculine (much as the English goose can refer either to the species as a whole or specifically females of the species when contrasted with gander). For example, la vaca can refer to the species 'cattle' or the female of the species 'cow', but el toro refers only to the male of the species 'bull'.

Notably, not all nouns that refer to humans and animals belong to this class of noun; thus, not all nouns that refer to humans and animals take different forms for the masculine and feminine. For example, la persona 'person' does not belong to this class and is always feminine, regardless of the sex or gender of the person. Similarly, la araña 'spider' does not belong to this class and is always feminine, regardless of the sex of the spider.

=== Gender of other nouns ===
In Spanish, nouns not belonging to the class described above form another class of noun. The gender of nouns in this other class are arbitrarily assigned. However, some general patterns help to predict the gender of nouns. Notably, the endings of nouns give clues to their genders. For instance, nouns ending in -o are usually masculine. The exceptions are la dínamo 'dynamo' (also el dínamo in Latin America), la disco 'disco', la foto 'photo', la líbido 'libido', la magneto 'magneto' (also el magneto), la mano 'hand', la moto 'motorcycle', and la radio 'radio' (also el radio in Latin America). Words ending in -aje, -or, -án, -ambre or a stressed vowel are also typically masculine. The exceptions are la flor 'flower', el hambre 'hunger', la labor 'labor', and la pelambre 'patch of hair' (also el pelambre). Nouns ending in -men or -gen are also often masculine, but there are exceptions, such as la imagen 'image'. Finally, nouns that both end in -ma or -eta and are derived from Greek are typically masculine.

Many grammars of Spanish suggest that nouns ending in -a are feminine, but there is no requirement that Spanish nouns ending in -a be feminine. Thus, grammars that pose such a requirement also typically include a long list of exceptions, such as el alerta 'alert', el bocata 'sandwich', el caza 'fighter plane', and many others. More reliable markers of feminine nouns are -ez, -eza, -ción, -ía, -sión, -dad, -tad, -tud, -umbre, -ie, -nza, -cia, -sis, and -itis. The exceptions for -ez are el ajedrez 'chess' and el pez 'fish', and the exceptions for -sis are el análisis 'analysis', el éxtasis 'ecstasy', el apocalipsis 'apocalypse', el paréntesis 'parenthesis', and el énfasis 'emphasis'.

Though the gender of nouns in this class does not correspond to biological sex, it can mark other kinds of differences. For example, gender marks the difference between a tree (typically masculine) and its fruit (typically feminine). Thus, el almendro and el cerezo refer to 'almond tree' and 'cherry tree', respectively, while la almendra and la cereza refer to 'almond' and 'cherry', respectively. In many cases, these patterns with specific nouns can be traced to a common hypernym. For example, el almendro and el cerezo are masculine because the hypernym el árbol 'tree' is masculine. The following table lists some of these patterns.

| Class | Gender | Example | Hyponym | Reference |
|---|---|---|---|---|
| automobiles | masculine | un Mercedes | el automóvil | |
| cardinal directions | masculine | el Sur | el punto cardinal | |
| centuries | masculine | el XV | el siglo | |
| colors | masculine | el azul | el color | |
| companies | feminine | la Mercedes | la empresa | |
| days | masculine | el lunes | el día | |
| fruits | feminine | la cereza | la fruta | |
| highways | feminine | la Nacional IV | la carretera | |
| hours | feminine | las cuatro | las horas | |
| islands | feminine | las Canarias | la isla | |
| lakes | masculine | el Titicaca | el lago | |
| languages | masculine | el ruso | el idioma | |
| letters | feminine | la eme | la letra | |
| months | masculine | el agosto | el mes | |
| motorcycles | feminine | una Vespa | la motocicleta | |
| mountains | masculine | los Alpes | el monte | |
| numbers | masculine | el cuatro | el número | |
| oceans | masculine | el Pacífico | el océano | |
| rivers | masculine | el Amazonas | el río | |
| seas | masculine | el Cantábrico | el mar/la mar | |
| sports teams | masculine | el Peñarol | el equipo | |
| trees | masculine | el cerezo | el árbol | |
| years | masculine | el 1999 | el año | |

The gender of nouns in this class may also mark distinctions related to size and shape, such as the distinction between el cántaro 'pitcher' and la cántara 'large pitcher'. Further, some polysemic nouns can be distinguished by their gender. For example, el margen (masculine) means 'margin' while la margen means 'river bank'. Similarly, el cura (masculine) means 'priest' while la cura means 'cure'.

Like all nouns in Spanish, borrowed nouns must also be masculine or feminine, even when the nouns are borrowed from languages that lack grammatical gender. In these cases, nouns referring to certain humans and animals behave as expected (taking their gender from the biological sex or gender of the referent), but there are no formal rules that determine the gender of borrowed nouns of the other class. Generally, a borrowed noun in this class will be feminine if it resembles a more established feminine noun in form or meaning or, less reliably, if it is grammatically feminine in its language of origin. For example, la boutique 'boutique' is a borrowing from French, in which it is also feminine. Further, its meaning is similar to more established Spanish noun la tienda 'shop', which is also feminine. La app 'app (in computing)' is a borrowing from English, which lacks a robust system of grammatical gender. It is generally treated as feminine in Spanish because it is similar in form and meaning to la aplicación 'application', which is also feminine. Borrowed nouns of this class that do not meet these criteria are typically treated as masculine. For example, el aftershave 'aftershave' cannot inherit a gender from its language of origin (English) and is not sufficiently similar to a more established Spanish noun, so it defaults to masculine.

=== Variation ===
The gender of some nouns in Spanish are subject to variation. It is rare that the same speakers use these nouns in both genders without difference in meaning; that is, speakers do not just pick a form at random, but rather, something about the speaker or the intended meaning leads one gender or the other to be preferred in a particular context. For example, mar 'sea' is typically masculine but may be feminine for those who work on or near the sea, especially in the context of that work. Similarly, radio 'radio' is feminine for many speakers in Spain but masculine for speakers in many parts of Latin America. Internet causes speakers to hesitate between making it masculine like other loanwords from English, or making it feminine to agree with red, 'net'. Meanwhile, azúcar 'sugar' can be masculine with el, feminine with la, or feminine with el (perhaps as a carry-over from Old Spanish, in which the singular definite article was invariably el before nouns beginning with a-, regardless of gender and regardless of stress). Arte 'art' is masculine in the singular and feminine in the plural, though it can be feminine in the singular when it means 'art-form' and masculine in the plural in the expression los artes de pesca 'fishing gear'.

=== Vestiges of the neuter ===
Spanish has vestiges of a neuter gender; this is seen in pronouns like esto, eso, aquello, and ello, some instances of pronoun lo, and the article lo. Bello also notes that words such as nada, poco, algo, and mucho can be used as neuters in some contexts. However, all this doesn't affect nouns, which never have a neutral gender.

=== Gender of proper nouns (names) ===
People's names agree with the sex of the person, even when the name ending might seem the opposite: Chema es guapo, Amparo es guapa. The same rule applies to those animals which have a name.

==== Names of settlements ====
The gender of geographical names has no fixed rules, there are just tendencies:

- Names ending in -a are typically feminine, otherwise they tend to be masculine:
  - la Barcelona de Gaudí
  - el Londres de Dickens
- Sometimes the gender agrees with the underlying noun el pueblo or la ciudad:
  - la gran Nueva York (city)
  - la antigua Cartago (city)
  - Fraga es pequeño (village/small town)

In Nueva York (New York), the feminine nueva is a fixed part of the name, however it's still possible to deal with the name as masculine, though feminine would be more common. New Mexico is translated as Nuevo México and considered masculine, since México is a masculine noun.

== Number ==
Spanish has two grammatical numbers: singular and plural. The singular form is the lemma, and the plural is the marked form. Whether a noun is singular or plural generally depends on the referent of the noun, with singular nouns typically referring to one being and plural nouns to multiple. In this way, nouns differ from other Spanish words that show number contrast (i.e., adjectives, determiners, and verbs), which vary in number to agree with nouns. In the clause aquellos intentos buenos resultaron vanos 'those good attempts were in vain', for example, the head of the noun phrase subject (intentos) gives its plural number to the other elements in the noun phrase (the determiner aquellos and the adjective buenos). The plural number is also reflected in the form of the verb (the third-person plural resultaron) and the predicative complement (the plural adjective vanos).

Two or more nouns coordinated via the coordinator y 'and' are typically treated as plural for agreement purposes. In the noun phrase el lápiz y el bolígrafo rojos 'the red pencil and pen', for example, the adjective rojos is plural because the two singular nouns (el lápiz and el bolígrafo) are coordinated via y. In cases in which an adjective precedes the coordinated nouns, however, that adjective is usually in the singular form. For example, the adjective and both nouns are singular in the noun phrase enorme cuidado y precisión 'enormous care and precision'.

Some words are always grammatically plural. Much as the English noun eyeglasses, for instance, is always plural, the Spanish noun las gafas 'eyeglasses' is always plural. Some of these nouns do not share their always plural status with their English counterparts. For example, las vacaciones is rare in the singular form, corresponding to both 'vacation' and 'vacations' in English. Many of the always plural nouns fall into specific semantic classes. For example, many are related to foods (e.g., comestibles 'groceries', espaguetis 'spaghetti'), amounts of money (e.g., emolumentos 'emoluments', finanzas 'finances'), and places (e.g., estribaciones 'foothills', exteriores 'exteriors'). Other Spanish nouns are always singular. Such nouns are often noncountable nouns, such as el caos 'chaos' and la grima 'disgust'.

=== Plural formation ===
A noun that ends in an unstressed vowel adds -s to form the plural. A noun that ends in a consonant (including y) adds -es to form the plural. For nouns that end in -z, the -z changes to -c- when the -es plural morpheme is added. The noun la luz 'light', for example, has the plural form las luces 'lights'. A noun that ends in a stressed vowel will add -s or -es to form the plural. Generally, nouns ending in -á, -é, and -ó add -s to form the plural, while nouns ending in -í and -ú can admit both variants (-s and -es) to form the plural. For example, el café 'café' has the plural form los cafés while the noun el tabú 'taboo' has the plural forms los tabús and los tabúes. Polysyllabic nouns that end in an -s following an unstressed vowel do not add an overt plural morpheme while other nouns ending in -s behave as expected for a noun ending in a consonant, adding -es to form the plural. For instance, the noun el jueves 'Thursday' has the plural form los jueves 'Thursdays'.

==== Loanwords ====
The formation of plurals for foreign words borrowed into Spanish does not always follow the same rules as more established Spanish nouns. As a general rule, borrowed words ending in a vowel (stressed or unstressed) will add an -s to the singular to form the plural. For example, the plural form of the English borrowing el interviú 'interview' is los interviús 'interviews'. English loanwords often keep their English plural forms in Spanish. For instance, el córner 'corner kick' has the plural form los córners 'corner kicks'. Many Latin nouns do not change in the plural at all (e.g., el confíteor 'confession' and los confíteor 'confessions') Some Latin nouns ending in -m may simply add -s to form the plural (e.g., el referéndum 'referendum' and los referéndums 'referendums'). Other Latin nouns ending in -m allow either an invariant plural form or a plural form ending in -s. For example, el quórum 'quorum' allows the plural forms los quórum and los quórums. Due to the influence of English, some plurals of Latin words in Spanish occasionally occur with their original Latin plural forms ending in -a, as in los córpora 'corpora' and los data 'data', but such plural forms are dispreferred by some prescriptivists who favor either invariant plurals (e.g., los corpus) or Hispanicized forms (e.g., los datos). Some loanwords enter Spanish in their plural forms but are reanalyzed as singular nouns (e.g., the Italian plurals el confeti 'confetti', el espagueti 'spaghetti', and el ravioli 'ravioli'). These words then follow the typical morphological rules of Spanish, essentially double marking the plural (e.g., los confetis, los espaguetis, and los raviolis).

=== Variation ===
In some varieties of Antillean Spanish, an additional -e or -es is added to the more traditional forms of certain plurals. For example, las cásase can be found in place of las casas 'houses'. Similarly, los güisquises can be found in place of los güisquis 'whiskies'.

In certain registers, nouns with plural referents can occur in the singular form when the plural is implied elsewhere, such as through the determiners mucho 'many' or tanto 'so many'. For example, a speaker might say mucha foto 'many photos' or tanto soldado 'so many soldiers' while a more formal register would require muchas fotos and tantos soldados, respectively.

While nouns ending in -í often allow either -s or -es to form the plural, more formal registers typically prefer the -es ending, especially in demonyms and the names of ethnic groups. For example, bengalí 'Bengali' can take the plural form bengalíes or bengalís, but bengalíes is typically preferred in more formal registers.

== Affective suffixes ==
Suffixes expressing a wide range of affective meanings can be added to Spanish nouns. These affective meanings include size, affection, disapproval, irony, and the like. However, the meanings of nouns derived from these suffixes is not always predictable. For example, a diminutive form of el coche 'car' is el cochecito 'baby carriage' while the diminutive form of el carro 'car' formed from the same suffix is el carrito 'shopping cart'. Some Spanish nouns can take a large number of affective suffixes, creating words with subtle differences in meaning or connotation. For instance, chico 'boy' has the derived forms chicarrón, chicazo, chicoco, chicote, chicuelo, chiquete, chiquilín, chiquillo, chiquitico, chiquito, chiquitín and chiquituco, each with a subtle distinction in meaning.

Affective suffixes are derivational rather than inflectional, but they share certain properties with inflectional suffixes. Like inflectional suffixes, affective suffixes are so widespread that words created from them tend not to be included in traditional dictionaries except when the resulting words have drastically different meanings. Also like inflectional suffixes, affective suffixes do not typically change the grammatical category of the base word; that is, a noun that takes an affective suffix will remain a noun after doing so, much as a noun that takes a plural inflectional suffix will remain a noun after doing so. But unlike inflectional suffixes, affective suffixes tend to add lexical, rather than grammatical, information to the base.

Certain kinds of nouns tend to disallow affective suffixes. Nouns that denote characteristics, qualities, and physical or mental states belong to this category. For example, altura 'height', bondad 'kindness', equilibrio 'equilibrium', and alegría 'joy' generally do not take affective suffixes. Some exceptions exist. For instance, the diminutives dudita and pasioncilla (from duda 'doubt' and pasión 'passion', respectively) are attested. Similarly, noncount nouns are less likely than count nouns to take affective suffixes. In the clause me fue de poca ayuda 'he was of little help to me', for example, the noun ayuda 'help' is modified by the adjective poca 'little' instead of taking a diminutive suffix because the clause uses a noncount sense of the noun. In the clause le pidió una ayudita 'he asked for a little help', on the other hand, the diminutive form ayudita is possible because the clause uses a count sense of the noun.

Various sociolinguistic factors affect the use of affective suffixes. For instance, they are generally used more often by speakers of Mexican Spanish than by speakers of European Spanish or Rioplatense Spanish and more often by women than by men. Additionally, affective suffixes are more common in registers directed toward children but less common in highly formal registers, such as in academic, legal, and administrative writing.

Three classes of affective suffixes are traditionally distinguished: diminutives, augmentatives, and pejoratives (though the class of pejorative suffixes occasionally intersects with the other two).

=== Diminutive suffixes ===
Diminutive suffixes generally convey small size. They most often indicate size when applied to nouns referring to material entities. Applying the diminutive suffix -ita to casa 'house', for example, produces casita, which refers to a small house.

When diminutive suffixes are applied to nouns of other semantic classes, the suffix may convey additional or alternate meanings. Applying a diminutive suffix to nouns that refer to professions, for instance, often signals contempt, as in un maestrillo mediocre 'a mediocre teacher'. For nouns that denote actions and events, diminutive suffixes generally indicate short duration, as in paseíto 'short walk'.

==== The suffix -ito and its variants ====
The most common diminutive suffix is -ito and its variants -cito and -ecito (as well as their respective feminine forms -ita, -cita, -ecita). The form of -ito used in the diminutive depends on both the gender and the pronunciation of the noun, and different varieties of Spanish occasionally follow different patterns.

In general, the -ito variant is used with nouns ending in unstressed -a or -o. For instance, casa 'house' forms the diminutive casita, and libro 'book' forms the diminutive librito. Exceptionally, in European Spanish, nouns ending in unstressed -a or -o generally takes the -ecito variant when the noun consists of two syllables and the stressed syllable contains the diphthong ⟨ie⟩ or ⟨ue⟩, as in hierbecita (from hierba 'grass') and jueguecito (from juego 'game'). This exception tends not to be observed in the Spanishes of America, where diminutive forms in -ito, such as hierbita, are more common.

For nouns ending in unstressed -e, the variant used depends on the number of syllables in the base. When the base has three or more syllables, the -ito variant is used to form the diminutive. For example, aceite 'oil' forms the diminutive aceitito. When the noun ending in -e has fewer than three syllables, the diminutive is usually formed with the -ecito variant. For instance, aire 'air' forms the diminutive airecito.

Nouns ending in stressed vowels (specifically, -á and -é) typically form the diminutive with -cito. For example, té 'tea' forms the diminutive tecito. Nouns ending in stressed -í, -ó, and ú do not typically allow diminutives. For instance, tabú 'taboo' does not have a diminutive form *tabucito. Exceptionally, some dialects of Spanish do allow diminutive forms of these nouns for certain words, as in ajicito from ají 'chili' in Caribbean and Andean Spanish.

Monosyllabic nouns ending in consonants use different variants of -ito depending on the dialect. In Latin American Spanish, the -cito form is typically used while, in European Spanish, the -ecito form is generally used. But even in Latin American Spanish, monosyllabic nouns ending in -s and -z tend to use the -ecito form.

Polysyllabic nouns ending in -n and -r generally form diminutives with -cito, as in empujoncito from empujón 'push' and amorcito from amor 'love'. Diminutive suffixes are not typically added to polysyllabic nouns ending in -d. For instance, el césped 'lawn' does not have a diminutive form *el céspedito. Polysyllabic nouns ending in consonants other than -n, -r, and -d typically use -ito to form the diminutive, as in arrocito from arroz 'rice'.

The table below summarizes these typical patterns.

| Type of noun | Form of -ito |
|---|---|
| Noun ending in unstressed -a or -o | -ito |
| Two-syllable noun ending in unstressed -a or -o and containing diphthong ⟨ie⟩ or ⟨ue⟩ | -ecito (Europe) -ito (America) |
| Noun of three or more syllables ending in unstressed -e | -ito |
| Noun of fewer than three syllables ending in unstressed -e. | -ecito |
| Noun ending in stressed vowel | -cito |
| Monosyllabic noun ending in -s or -z | -ecito |
| Monosyllabic noun ending in consonant other than -s or -z | -cito (America) -ecito (Europe) |
| Polysyllabic noun ending in -n or -r | -cito |
| Polysyllabic noun ending in consonant other than -n or -r | -ito |

Generally, the diminutive suffix -ito is added to a noun more often than a noun is modified by chico 'small' or pequeño 'little'. Thus, una casita 'a small house' is generally encountered more often than una casa chica 'a small house'.

==== Regional diminutive suffixes ====
The choice of diminutive is often a mark of regional varieties and influence of coexistent Romance languages. The diminutive suffixes -ico/-ica, -iño/-iña and -ín/-ina, for example, are especially common in Asturias specifically and northwestern Spain more generally. They are also found in Argentina and Uruguay. The suffix -uco/-uca is often used in Cantabria. The suffix -illo/-illa is especially common as a diminutive in Andalusia and southern Spain more generally. In the Spanishes spoken in the Americas, however, -illo often also carries a pejorative connotations. The noun hombrecillo, for example, can be glossed as 'insignificant little man'. The suffix -ete is often used in Aragon, Valencia, and Catalonia. Other regional diminutive suffixes include -eto/-eta (used in Aragon) and -uelo/-uela.

=== Augmentative suffixes ===
Augmentative suffixes, such as the most frequently used -ón/-ona, generally convey large size. Compare, for instance, la silla 'chair' and the augmented el sillón 'armchair'. Because largeness sometimes carries negative overtones, augmentative suffixes sometimes carry negative associations, such as awkwardness, clumsiness, excess, and unpleasantness. For example, an augmented form of la soltera 'bachelorette' is the derogatory la solterona 'spinster'.

The augmentative suffix -azo is similar to -ón in that it is also often pejorative in addition to augmentative. An augmented form of las manos 'hands', for example, is las manazas 'clumsy hands'. However, -azo can also imply admiration or greatness. For instance, an augmented form of el éxito 'success' is el exitazo 'great success'.

The suffixes -ón and -azo have uses in addition to their uses as augmentative suffixes. These uses are not traditionally grouped with affective suffixes in grammars of Spanish and include deriving nouns and adjectives from verbs (such as abusón 'bully' and mirón 'voyeur') and forming nouns that denote a blow or sudden movement (such as flechazo 'arrow shot' and hachazo 'axe blow').

In Mexico and Central America, -ote is generally preferred over -azo. For example, the augmentative form of mano 'hand' is typically manota in Mexico and Central America but manaza elsewhere. Like with the diminutive suffix -ito, -ote takes variant forms in certain environments. For example, the variant -zote is used in the same contexts in which -ito would become -cito, such as when a polysyllabic noun ends in -n (as in camionzote from camión 'truck').

The suffix -aco is also augmentative.

=== Pejorative suffixes ===
Though diminutive and augmentative suffixes occasionally add pejorative meanings in addition to other affective meanings, certain suffixes add meaning that is primarily pejorative. These suffixes include the following:

- -aco/-aca, as in pajarraco from pájaro 'bird'.
- -acho/-acha, as in amigacha and picacho.
- -ajo/-aja, as in cintajo from cinta 'ribbon' and sombrajo from sombra 'shadow'.
- -astro/-astra, as in camastro from cama 'bed' and poetastro from poeta 'poet'.
- -ato/-ata, as in niñato 'immature child' and novato 'newbie'.
- -orrio/-orra, as in bodorrio from boda 'wedding' and villorrio from villa 'town'.
- -orro/-orra, as in abejerro from abeja 'bee' and vidorra from vida 'life'.
- -ucho/-ucha, as in animalucho from animal 'animal' and cuartucho from cuarto 'bedroom'.
- -ute, as in franchute (a derogatory term for a person from France).
