= Protocol for the reconstruction of Austria =

1922 multilateral agreement on Austria

The protocol for the reconstruction of Austria was an agreement concluded on 4 October 1922 between the government of Austria and the governments of the United Kingdom, France, Italy and Czechoslovakia, which provided for a gradual reconstruction of the Austrian economy under League of Nations supervision. It was registered in the League of Nations Treaty Series on the same day. The Spanish government acceded to the protocol on 3 November 1922.

== Terms ==
The protocol consisted of three declarations, all issued on the same date.

In Declaration No. 1, the signatory parties undertook not to violate Austrian territorial or economic independence.

Declaration No. 2 regulated the foreign loans to be granted to the Austrian government and established a Committee of Control, consisting of the other signatory parties, to overlook the allocations of funds during reconstruction.

Declaration No. 3 granted the Austrian government the time required to arrange internal legislation to conform to Declaration No. 2, as well as the right to appeal certain decisions made by the Committee of Control.

== Aftermath ==
The 1922 protocol was supplemented by the "Austrian Protocol" signed on 15 July 1932, under which the governments of Belgium, Britain, France, Italy and the Netherlands undertook to lend the Austrian government 300,000,000 Austrian schillings for a period of 20 years.

== See also ==
- Protocol for the reconstruction of Hungary
- Economy of Austria
- Aftermath of World War I

== Sources ==
- Text of the Protocol
- An article about the protocol
- Another explanation
- New York Times report about the conclusion of the Protocol
