= Economic policy of the Nicolás Maduro administration =

Economics in Venezuela starting in 2013

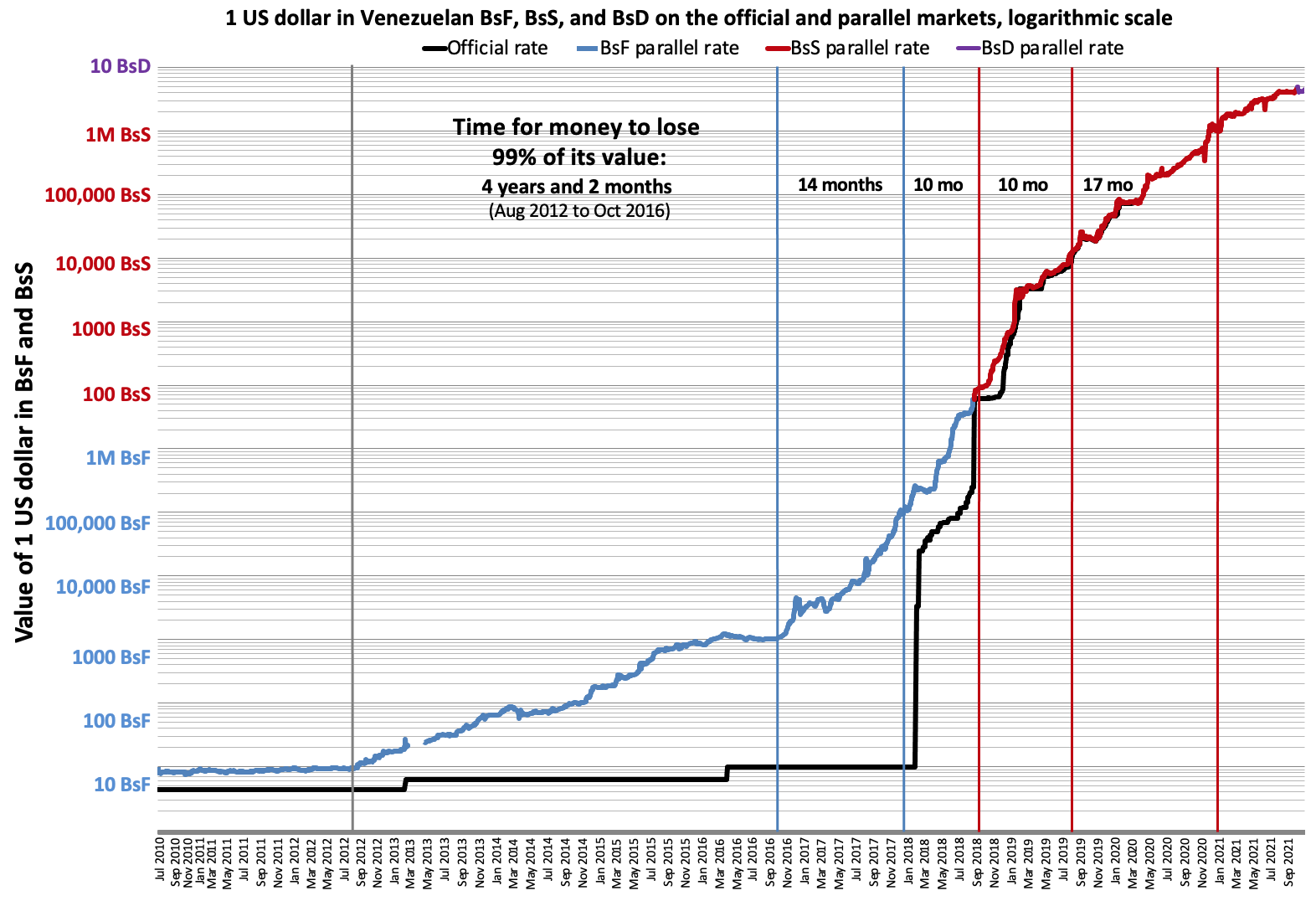
The value of one US dollar in Venezuelan Bolivares fuertes on the black market through time according to DolarToday.com. Blue vertical lines represent every time the currency has lost 90% of its value. This has happened four times since 2012, meaning that the currency is worth as of December 2017 almost 10,000 times less than in August 2012 since it has lost more than 99.99% of its value. The rate at which the value is lost (inflation) is accelerating. The first time the money took 2 years and 2 months to lose 90% of its value, the second time 1 year and 10 months, the third time 10 months and the fourth time only 4 months.

From his election in 2013 until he was captured in early 2026, Nicolás Maduro continued the majority of existing economic policies of his predecessor Hugo Chávez. When entering the presidency, President Maduro's Venezuela faced a high inflation rate and large shortages of goods that was left over from the previous policies of President Chávez. These economic difficulties continue to be a contributing factor to protests in Venezuela. President Maduro has blamed capitalism for speculation that is driving high rates of inflation and creating widespread shortages of staples, and often said he was fighting an "economic war", calling newly enacted economic measures "economic offensives" against political opponents he and loyalists state are behind an international economic conspiracy. However, President Maduro has been criticized for only concentrating on public opinion instead of tending to the practical issues economists have warned the Venezuelan government about or creating any ideas to improve the economic situation in Venezuela such as the "economic war".

In 2014, Venezuela's economy entered a recession with its economy contracting by 4.8%, 4.9% and 2.3% in the first three quarters. That year, Venezuela topped the Global Misery Index, which is based on inflation, unemployment, and other economic factors. In December 2014, it was stated that Venezuela had a 93% chance of being in default, while it has also been noted that the government has never failed to meet the country's foreign-debt obligations.

In 2015, Venezuela again topped the Global Misery Index and was expected to have its economy contract 7% according to the World Bank. The inflation rate also reached its highest rate in Venezuelan history.

In 2019, Maduro started allowing transactions in U.S. dollars, a much more stable currency which is also used for international money transfers. People in Venezuela receive about $3.5 to $4 billion per year in remittances from family members; this change allowed Venezuelans to spend that money and started an economic recovery.

== Government policies ==
=== Petroleum and natural resources ===
==== Petroleum industry ====
In 2014, oil production was estimated to be near 2.7 million barrels per day, 13% lower than when Hugo Chávez took office in 1999. There were shortages and rationing of gas in some areas of Venezuela, which according to the Venezuelan government, is to combat smuggling of cheaper fuel to Colombia. PDVSA stated that the gasoline supply was running normally and that the long lines stated at gas stations were "destabilizing rumors factions opposing the Bolivarian government".

In August 2014, after several attempts to raise gas prices, Oil Minister and president of PDVSA Rafael Ramirez announced that Venezuela would raise domestic gas prices, though they would still not be comparable to international averages. Government figures estimated that PDVSA had annual losses of $12.5 billion with the subsidized gas prices, with PDVSA paying 28 times more to produce gasoline and 50 times more for diesel than what consumers pay at gas stations. However, Rafael Ramirez was removed from being head of PDVSA and the oil ministry the next month.

In October 2014, Venezuela's oil prices dropped to a four-year low and President Maduro called for an emergency meeting with OPEC. With Venezuela's oil prices down to $77.65 per barrel, down $15 from the previous month, President Maduro later stated that in Venezuela's 2015 budget, prices of oil would be placed around $60 per barrel contrasting the previous averages of nearly $100 per barrel. However, by January 2016, Venezuelan oil was selling near $24 a barrel, bringing a profit near the cost of producing a single barrel which was slightly below $20 per barrel.

Shortly after being granted special economic powers in February 2016, President Maduro increased the price of gas by 6,200%, though this increase only translated to new gas prices costing of a few American cents with Venezuela still enjoying the cheapest gasoline prices in the world. This was the first rise of gas prices since the Caracazo in 1989 when protests were held over the increased prices, with this event leading to the rise of Maduro's predecessor, Hugo Chávez.

==== Other resources ====
During Venezuela's economic crisis, the rate of gold excavated fell 64.1% between February 2013 and February 2014 and iron production dropped 49.8%. The production of steel and aluminium of multiple Venezuelan steelmakers dropped in 2014, with the state-owned steelmaker Sidor having a drop in production of 33.5%, the lowest levels since the 1980s.

=== Social spending and public works ===
In May 2016, the National Assembly passed a law compelling the executive branch and Nicolás Maduro to accept foreign aid for healthcare and medical supplies, including medicines that have experienced supply shortages. The intent of this law is to offset decline in services and supply shortages. Every citizen and resident in Venezuela is entitled to healthcare as both a human and constitutional right and guaranteed by law.

==== Health care ====
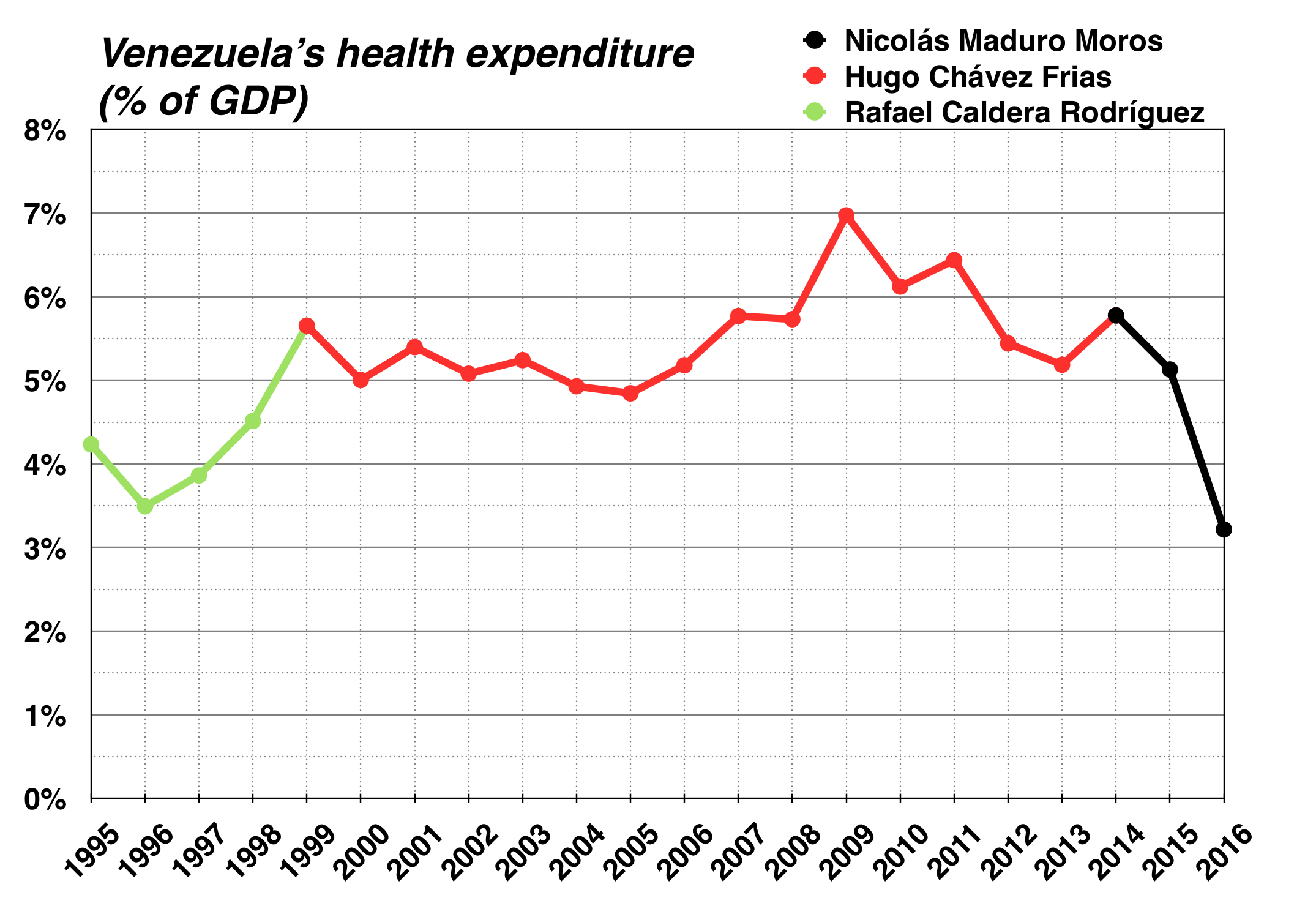
Healthcare spending by percentage of Venezuela's GDP Source: [http://data.worldbank.org/indicator/SH.XPD.TOTL.ZS?page=3 World Bank

In February 2014, doctors at University of Caracas Medical Hospital stopped performing surgeries due to the lack of supplies. The government's currency policy has made it difficult to import drugs and other medical supplies into Venezuela. The executive director of the Venezuelan Association of Hospitals and Clinics explained how in less than a month, shortages of 53 medical products rose to 109 products and explained how the CADIVI system was to blame since 86% of medical supplies are imported.

An Associated Press report dated February 2014 noted that "legions of the sick across the country" were being "neglected by a health care system doctors say is collapsing after years of deterioration." Doctors at one hospital "sent home 300 cancer patients ... when supply shortages and overtaxed equipment made it impossible for them to perform non-emergency surgeries." The government, which controlled "the dollars needed to buy medical supplies," had "simply not made enough" dollars available for those supplies, the AP reported. As a result, "many patients began dying from easily treatable illnesses when Venezuela's downward economic slide accelerated after Chavez's death." Doctors called it impossible "to know how many have died, and the government doesn't keep such numbers, just as it hasn't published health statistics since 2010." Among the items "in critically short supply" were "needles, syringes and paraffin used in biopsies to diagnose cancer; drugs to treat it; operating room equipment; X-ray film and imaging paper; blood and the reagents needed so it can be used for transfusions." The previous month, the government had "suspended organ donations and transplants." Also, over "70 percent of radiotherapy machines" were "now inoperable." Dr. Douglas Natera, president of the Venezuelan Medical Federation, said, "Two months ago we asked the government to declare an emergency," but they received no response. Health Minister Isabel Iturria refused to give the AP an interview, while a deputy health minister, Nimeny Gutierrez, "denied on state TV that the system is in crisis." The Venezuelan Pharmaceutical Federation reported shortages of 70% of medicines at pharmacies throughout Venezuela in 2015.

==== Infrastructure ====
In September 2013, a power outage left 70% of the country without electricity for about three hours in the middle of the day. Another widespread outage occurred on December 2, 2013, days before Venezuela's nationwide municipal elections, just after 8 p.m. local time; power began to return within an hour or two, "though remoter parts of the nation of 29 million people were still in the dark late into the evening." Critics stated that a lack of maintenance had caused the outage, while President Maduro accused the opposition of sabotaging the national grid with the aim to discredit him ahead of the nationwide municipal elections. By February 2016, the Venezuelan government began rationing electricity in the capital city of Caracas, blaming El Nino for low energy production from the country's hydroelectric plants.

According to a Runrunes report showing confidential water reports from the state-run water organization HidroCentro, tests showed that tap water contained bacteria, human waste, oils, detergents and radioactive materials appeared in Carabobo and other states in Venezuela.

==== Housing ====
In 2011, the Venezuelan government promised to build an additional 3 million housing units in a country where many "live in precariously built shacks in the hilly capital, Caracas" according to The Washington Post. At the end of April 2017, Maduro marked the completion of 1.6 million houses under government programs established under the Chávez government.

==== Transportation ====
In late 2013, a major railway project in Venezuela was delayed because Venezuela could not pay US$7.5 billion and owed China Railway nearly US$500 million.

In May 2014, the Central Bank of Venezuela announced that the shortage rate of automobiles was at 100%. Automobiles manufacturers in Venezuela, such as Ford, General Motors and Toyota decreased or in some cases ceased production entirely. In January 2015, Maduro revived the use of transportation tolls in the country for more revenue despite the removal by Chavez, who stated the tolls did not help pay to maintain roads and were part of a capitalist system.

==== Food ====
On April 3, 2016, Maduro created the Comité Local de Abastecimiento y Producción (CLAP), which are local committees for supplying and distributing food house by house.

=== Criticism ===
In March 2019, The Wall Street Journal said that "Mr. Maduro has long used food and other government handouts to pressure impoverished Venezuelans to attend pro-government rallies and to support him during elections as the country's economic meltdown has intensified."

=== International policies ===
==== Foreign debt ====
According to a February 2014 article in The Economist, the Venezuelan government was, as of that date, running out of hard currency to pay bills. Many airlines, including Air Canada, Air Europa, American Airlines, Copa Airlines, TAME, TAP Airlines, and United Airlines, suspended international flights operating in Venezuela because the government restricted access to the U.S. dollar. There were talks among airlines of canceling even more international flights out of the country since Venezuela still owed foreign airlines nearly US$4.0 billion. A September 2014 Economist article, said that $7 billion of debt (nearly 33% of Venezuela's $21 billion foreign reserves) was due the next month. In 2017 Goldman Sachs was reported to have paid $865 million for Venezuelan government bonds which it bought for 32 cents in the dollar and were to be repaid in 2022. Sources said that Sachs were buying the bonds on the assumption that the government would fall and the value of the bonds would rise. In November 2017 Standard & Poor's, declared Venezuela to be in "selective default" and the Fitch ratings agency declared the state owned PDVSA oil company in "restrictive default" after failing to pay interest on its obligations. These ratings were one level above full default (a full default would mean PDVSA's assets could be seized by creditors – such as oil shipments and the Citgo refinery in Texas). Venezuela's foreign debt was estimated at US$105 billion and reserves at US$10 billion. Nevertheless, commentators believed Venezuela might still be able to get loans from China and Russia in exchange for mineral and oil rights.

==== Foreign trade ====
In 2013, foreign trade from Venezuela was ranked 179 out of 185 countries due to many reasons. One was the large number of documents that are needed in order to export and import. The amount of time to export goods from Venezuela is more than five times longer than the average country with the time importing is eight times longer than average. Prices for trade are also three times higher than the average country.

The United States supplies more than one-third of Venezuela's food imports. Recent government import policies have led to the shortage of goods throughout the country. During the crisis in Bolivarian Venezuela, Maduro decided to purchase hundreds of military vehicles to be used against large waves of protests instead of purchasing goods to import for Venezuelans, allocating only 15% of the necessary amount of funds to buy goods for supermarkets.

==== International assistance ====
In January 2015, Maduro toured countries in Asia seeking support following the steep decline in oil prices since June 2014, asking for financial agreements and the cut of production by OPEC. Despite statements by Maduro saying that multibillion-dollar agreements were made, few details were given, oil prices fell another 8% and his tour was described as a failure.

=== Nationalization of industries ===
==== Food distribution ====
In July 2015, Maduro's "government ordered major food companies, including units of PepsiCo and Nestlé Inc., to evacuate warehouses in an area where the state plans to expropriate land to build low-cost housing." In February 2015, the government previously nationalized the Dia a Dia chain of 35 supermarkets in Venezuela because, in its view, the chain was engaged in hoarding during a food shortage.

== Economic indicators ==
=== Business environment ===
The business environment in Venezuela during the beginning of Maduro's tenure was poor according to multiple organizations. In his first year as president, 77,839 business closed with according to the government's National Statistics Institute (INE). The loss of 173,000 Venezuelan jobs was allegedly due to the implementation of Maduro's Organic Law of Fair Prices according to the president of the Business and Trade Union Services Zulia (UCEZ), Gilberto Gudino Millan, because it supposedly prevents the free development of the private sector. In 2014, President Maduro also created "a freeze on commercial rents at rates more than 50 percent lower than they had been at some malls" which resulted with Venezuela's malls and retail industry losing 75% of their incomes.

==== 2013 ====
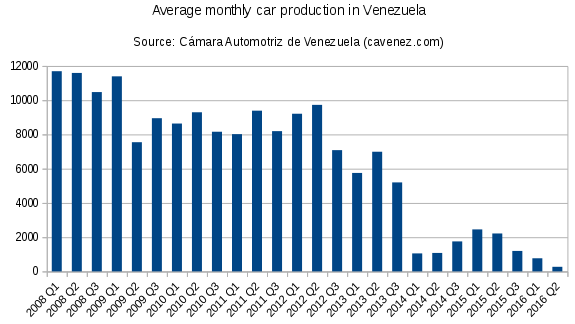
Average monthly car production between 2008 and 2016

The International Finance Corporation ranked Venezuela one of the lowest countries for doing business ranking it 180 of 185 countries for its Doing Business 2013 report with protecting investors and taxes being its worst rankings. In the 2013 Legatum Prosperity Index, Venezuela ranked 78 of 142 countries property rankings with governance as the worst category.

==== 2014 ====
In 2014, The Economist said Venezuela was "[p]robably the world's worst-managed economy". Citibank believed " that the economy has little prospect of improvement" and that the state of the Venezuelan economy was a "disaster". For the Doing Business 2014 report by the International Finance Corporation and The World Bank, Venezuela continued to be ranked low and dropped down one rank to 182 of 189. According to Foreign Policy, Venezuela was ranked last in the world on its Base Yield Index due to low returns that investors receive when investing in Venezuela. In a 2014 report titled Scariest Places on the Business Frontiers by Zurich Financial Services and reported by Bloomberg, Venezuela was ranked as the riskiest emerging market in the world. According to the 2014 Legatum Prosperity Index, Venezuela dropped positions in multiple categories with an overall ranking of 100 of 142 countries, dropping 22 positions in from the previous year.

==== 2015 ====
It is impossible to understand why the government is not reacting to this reality, why it has not taken measures to alleviate the economic distortions that are destroying the real income of Venezuelans.

— Barclays, September 2015

For the Doing Business 2015 report by the International Finance Corporation and The World Bank, Venezuela once again ranked low and fell four ranks to 186 of 189, with only African nations such as South Sudan, Libya and Eritrea performing worse. According to Bank of America's Transforming World Atlas, Venezuela had the world's highest credit default risk. Barclays stated that Venezuela was in its worst economic crisis in its history. Barclays also predicted that Venezuela's economy would shrink 9.1% in 2015 and that between 2014 and 2016, the economy would decline 16.5% and accumulated inflation would be over 1,000%. Capital Economics expected Venezuela's economy to fall 10% in 2015 and stated the economy was suffering its worst recession in over 70 years.

==== 2016 ====
In the Doing Business 2016 report, Venezuela remained ranked 186 of 189, with starting a business, international trading and taxes being the worst categories. In February 2016, The Washington Post stated: "The political drama in Venezuela, where a populist, authoritarian government is attempting to cling to power despite losing a legislative election by a landslide, tends to obscure a deeper crisis. Though it is awash in oil, the country of 30 million people is facing an economic collapse and a humanitarian disaster".

=== Consumer prices and inflation ===
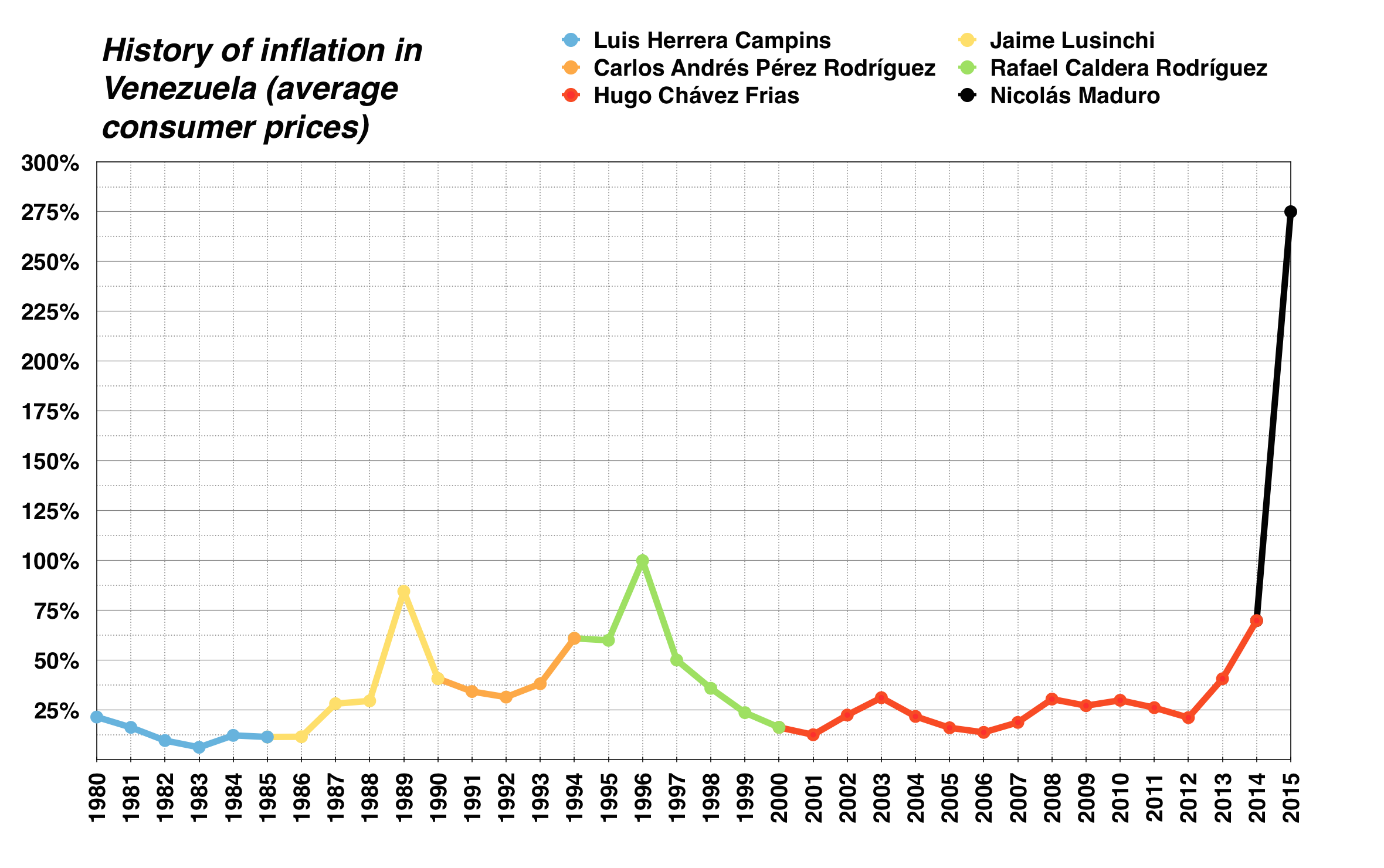
Inflation raised to its highest levels in Venezuelan history under Maduro Sources: International Monetary Fund: Data & Statistics (1980–2008, 2015) and CIA: The World Factbook (2009–2014)

During the first year of President Maduro's presidency, Venezuela's economy began to experience hyperinflation according to experts. Reasons for the high inflation rate include both heavy money-printing and deficit spending. In April 2013, the month he took office, Venezuela's annual inflation rate was 29.4%, only 0.1% less than when Hugo Chávez took office in 1999 and the annual inflation rate was at 29.5%. By April 2014, Venezuela's annual inflation rate was 61.5%. In early 2014, the Central Bank of Venezuela did not release statistics for the first time in its history with Forbes reporting that it was a possible way to manipulate the image of economy. In April 2014, the International Monetary Fund stated that economic activity in Venezuela is uncertain but may continue to slow saying that "loose macroeconomic policies have generated high inflation and a drain on official foreign exchange reserves". The IMF suggested that "more significant policy changes are needed to stave off a disorderly adjustment". Data provided by economist Steve H. Hanke of the Cato Institute shows that Venezuela's current economy, as of March 2014, had an inflation rate hovering above 300%, an official inflation rate around 60% and a product scarcity index rising above 25% of goods. Inflation data for September and October 2014 was not reported by the Venezuelan government.

In April 2014, President Maduro raised the minimum wage by 30%, hoping to improve citizens' purchasing power. According to El Nuevo Herald, most economists said that the measure will only help temporarily due to the official inflation rate being over 59% and that the wage increase will only make situations on companies more difficult since they already face a shortage of currency. In January 2015, the Venezuelan government announced that the minimum wage would be raised 15%. On 1 May 2015, President Maduro announced that the minimum wage would increase 30%; 20% in May and 10% in July, with the newly announced minimum wage for Venezuelans being about $30 per month at the black market rate.

==== Change of inflation calculations ====
In September 2014, the Venezuelan government's Central Bank of Venezuela (BCV) reportedly changed its calculation methods for inflation from the more common Laspeyres price index to the Fisher price index, which changed the Venezuelan government's June inflation data from 5.7% to 4.4%, July's 5.5% rate to 4.1% and August's 4.3% to 3.9%. It was also stated in the BCV's August report that it was an "economic war that hindered the normal course of production activities and distribution of essential goods demanded by the Venezuelan people".

=== Credit ratings ===
In the beginning of President Maduro's presidency, Venezuela's credit ratings were downgraded to "junk territory" or below investment grade with negative outlooks according to most rating agencies. In a little more than one year, Standard and Poor's downgraded Venezuela's credit rating three times; from B+ to B in June 2013, B to B− in December 2013 and from B− to CCC+ in September 2014. Fitch Ratings also lowered each of Venezuela's credit ratings in March 2014 from B+ to B and even lower from B to CCC in December 2014. In December 2013, Moody's Investors Service also downgraded both Venezuela's local (B1) and foreign currency (B2) ratings to Caa1. The noted reasons of credit rating changes were the greatly increased likelihood of economic and financial collapse due to the Venezuelan government's policies and an "out of control" inflation rate.

In July 2017, Standard & Poor's lowered both the domestic and foreign credit ratings of Venezuela to CCC− due to the increasing risk of default. Fitch Ratings followed suit in August 2017, lowering local and foreign credit ratings to CC. In November 2017 Standard & Poor's rated Venezuela in technical default and Fitch ratings rated Venezuela's oil company PDVSA in restrictive default – one rank above full default.

=== Currency ===
Parallel dollar rates
Date first reached	Bs.F. per 1 USD
26 September 2014	100
25 February 2015	200
14 May 2015	300
21 May 2015	400
3 July 2015	500
9 July 2015	600
2 September 2015	700
29 September 2015	800
1 December 2015	900
3 February 2016	1,000
31 October 2016	1,500
21 November 2016	2,000
29 November 2016	3,000
30 November 2016	4,000
3 May 2017	5,000
26 May 2017	6,000
9 June 2017	7,000
15 June 2017	8,000
26 July 2017	9,000
28 July 2017	10,000
7 September 2017	20,000
13 October 2017	30,000
23 October 2017	40,000
10 November 2017	50,000
15 November 2017	60,000
17 November 2017	70,000
20 November 2017	80,000
29 November 2017	90,000
1 December 2017	100,000
9 January 2018	150,000
18 January 2018	200,000
9 April 2018	300,000

The growth in the BCV's money supply accelerated during the beginning of President Maduro's presidency, which caused more price inflation in the country. The money supply of the Bolivar in Venezuela increased 64% in 2014, three times faster than any other economy observed by Bloomberg at the time. Due to the rapidly decreasing value of the Bolivar Fuerte, Venezuelans jokingly called the currency "bolívar muerto" or "dead bolivar".

In September 2014, the unofficial exchange rate for the Bolivar Fuerte in Cúcuta reached 100 Bs.F. per US$1. In May 2015, the Bolivar Fuerte lost 25% of its value in a week, with the unofficial exchange rate being at 300 Bs.F. per US$1 on 14 May and reaching 400 Bs.F. per US$1 on 21 May. The Bolivar Fuerte dropped sharply again in July 2015, passing 500 Bs.F. per US$1 on 3 July and 600 Bs.F. per US$1 on 9 July. By February 2016, the unofficial rate reached 1,000 Bs.F. per USD.

In November 2016, the Bolivar Fuerte saw its largest monthly loss of value ever. The Bolivar Fuerte to United States dollar conversion rate passed the 2,000 Bs.F. per US$1 on 21 November 2016, reaching near 3,000 Bs.F. per US$1 only days after it passed the 2,000 mark. On 29 November 2016, the conversion rate increased to over 3,000 Bs.F. per US$1. In the month preceding 28 November 2016, the Bolivar Fuerte lost over 60% of its value.

==== Devaluation ====
In February 2016, President Maduro used his newly granted economic powers to devalue the strongest official exchange rate by 37%, that is, from 6.3 Bs.F per USD to 10 Bs.F per USD.

==== National cryptocurrency ====
In December 2017, Nicolas Maduro announced that Venezuela would issue an oil-backed state cryptocurrency called the 'Petro' in an attempt to shore up its struggling economy. The Petro was subsequently launched in February 2018. On 15 January 2024, the token was shut down, and all the remaining holdings were liquidated.

==== Currency redenomination ====
On 22 March 2018, President Nicolás Maduro announced a new monetary reform, in which the bolívar would once again be revalued at a ratio of 1 to 1,000, making the new bolívar equal to one million pre-2008 bolívares. The currency was renamed as the bolívar soberano ("sovereign bolívar"). New coins in denominations of 50 céntimos and 1 bolívar soberano, and new banknotes in denominations of 2, 5, 10, 20, 50, 100, 200 and 500 bolívares soberanos were introduced. The change will be made effective from June 4, 2018.

From 1 May 2018 until the original changeover date in the currency, prices should have been expressed in both bolívares (Bs.) and bolívares soberanos (Bs.S) at the original rate of 1000 to one. The President delayed the change, citing from Aristides Maza, "the period established to carry out the conversion is not enough"; the revaluation is now scheduled for August 20, 2018.

Maduro has announced that after the currency redenomination has carried out on 20 August 2018, these old denominations with a face value of 1000 bolívares fuertes or higher will circulate in parallel with the new series of bolívar soberano notes and will continue to be used for a limited time. Banknotes with a face value below 1000 bolívares will be withdrawn from circulation and cease to be legal tender on 20 August 2018.

=== Economic growth and production ===
In April 2014, President Maduro said that he had new plans for an "economic offensive," focusing on three objectives: to find new ways to spur economic production at all levels of the country, as growth had slipped in 2013 to 1.6% after record growth of 5.6% in 2012; to dismantle obstacles hindering goods from reaching ordinary citizens, including increased inspections and sanctions on companies found to be smuggling or hoarding goods; and to continue enforcing a "law of fair prices," which in part caps profits for businesses at 30%. Analyst Heckel Garcia, director of Econometric, said that the plans "will not be enough" to get Venezuela out of the crisis it is facing.

In the International Monetary Fund's World Economic Outlook report of April 2014, the IMF predicted that Venezuela would be the only country in the world whose GDP would contract that year. They and the United Nations Economic Commission for Latin America and the Caribbean predicted Venezuela's GDP contracted by about 0.5%. In 2014, UNECLAC's Economic Development Division estimated that Venezuela's economy contracted by 3% that year. In 2015, the IMF predicted that the Venezuelan economy contracted by 10% and in 2016 the IMF estimated the GDP contracted by 10%.

=== Employment ===
When President Maduro took office in early 2013, the unemployment rate in Venezuela was near 7.6% according to INE. In February 2014, the unemployment rate dropped to 7.2%. In January 2015, the unemployment rate then rose to 7.9%. In May 2016, the unemployment rate rose to 17%. By July 2017 the unemployment rate was estimated to have risen to over 25%, according to IMF's estimates.

=== Food and products ===
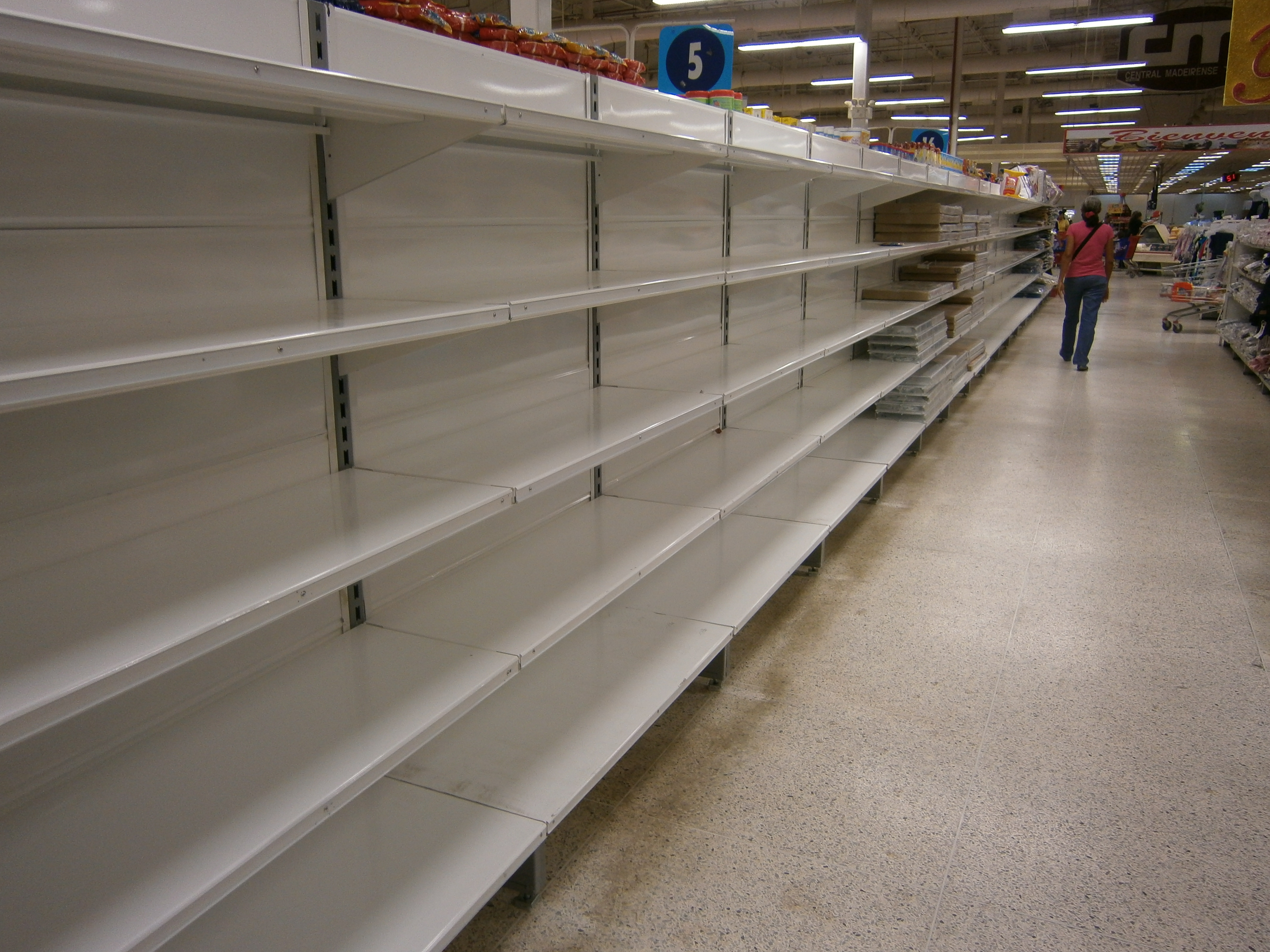
Empty shelves in a store due to shortages

Policies created by former President Hugo Chávez led to shortages that the country experienced when President Maduro entered into office. These policies were continued by President Maduro which led to greater shortages of due to the Venezuelan government's policy of withholding United States dollars from importers with price controls. Economist Asdrubal Oliveros of the Venezuelan consulting firm Ecoanalítica and economist Francisco Rodriguez of the Bank of America Corporation, among other economists, believe that the chronic shortages in Venezuela resulted from multiple elements, like over-reliance on imports, lack of production, price controls, and other government policies. President Maduro instead blames the CIA for Venezuela's shortages. Venezuelan producers also state that the lack of US dollars and strict price controls make it difficult to import the simple goods that are relied upon in Venezuela. Items became so scarce in late 2013 that nearly one quarter of products were not in stock. The chronic shortages included many necessities including foods; such as toilet paper, milk, and flour, as well as medical goods and automotive parts. Food shortages have led to looting and public vandalism on several occasions during Maduro's tenure.

Fears grew high due to a toilet paper shortage that resulted in the Venezuelan government occupying a MANPA toilet paper factory to check operations for the alleged "possible diversion of distribution" and "illegal management". El Tiempo reported that some goods in Venezuelan stores had a 114% to 425% premium due to "under the table" negotiations between the Venezuelan government and traders. Some Venezuelans combatted shortages by receiving food and hygiene products from relatives in the United States according to several shipping services. According to the Central Bank of Venezuela, food prices increased 76.2% between May 2013 and May 2014 with Solomon Centeno, an economist and university professor estimating for The Central Bank's statistics that the annual inflation for food would be above 100%. The Central Bank also recorded a 26.9% shortage of goods in March 2014.

In mid-2014, Venezuela faced shortages of water. Caracas suffered the most shortages and rationing of water due to what critics said was bad planning by the Venezuelan government. In some instances, trucks of water that were being delivered to residents in the municipality of Petare were robbed at gunpoint. President Nicolas Maduro stated that the water shortages the country was facing were due to global warming and El Niño. In an October 2014 article by Reuters, photographs of goods affected by price hikes and converted to USD prices included; a kilogram of carrots at $19.05, a 36 pack coloured pencils at $115, a pair of blue jeans at $793, a pair of running shoes at $1,198, among other goods.

==== Hunger ====
Venezuelans eating from garbage in late 2015

In 2013, President of the Venezuelan government's Instituto Nacional de Estadística (INE) Elias Eljuri suggested that all shortages in the country were due to Venezuelan's eating, saying that "95% of people eat three or more meals a day" while referencing a national survey. However, data provided by INE showed that in 2013, food consumption by Venezuelans actually decreased.

According to a survey titled Encuesta Condiciones de Vida Venezuela 2014 that was conducted by the Central University of Venezuela, Simón Bolívar University and Andrés Bello Catholic University, 11.3% of Venezuelans ate two or less meals daily and 80.1% of Venezuelans could not afford food. Of those who consumed less than three meals per day, 39.1% were among the poorest groups of society. According to those who worked for the survey, they stated that most Venezuelans say they have difficulties with obtaining food, with 11% saying they "felt sad, anxious or depressed all the time" about food while 31% said "experienced sadness".

In June 2015, a poll by Venebarometro found that 81.9% of Venezuelans could not afford food in the previous month before the survey.

In data provided by the Venezuelan Federation of Teachers' Center for Social Analysis (Cendas-FVM) in December 2017, the average Family Food Basket price in Venezuela, or the average price to provide enough food for one's needs, was 16,501,362.78 bolívares. With a minimum wage of 177,507.43 bolívares, it was still insufficient to pay for the Family Food Basket which would have required at least 93 months of minimum wage payments.

==== Dakazo and Merry Christmas Plan ====
I have immediately ordered the occupation of the network (Daka) and bring products to sell people a fair price. Leave nothing on the shelves!

— President Nicolas Maduro

The Dakazo refers to a set of actions taken by the Venezuelan government forcing consumer electronic retail stores, with Daka being the most prominent store, to sell products at much lower prices on 8 November 2013, weeks before municipal elections and a month before Christmas. The Venezuelan government claimed that Daka had raised its prices for products over 1000%, with such price raises common in Venezuela due to government currency controls, a currency black market adopted by Venezuelan importers and corruption among sellers and government officials. The announcement of lowered prices sparked looting of stores and warehouses in multiple cities across Venezuela. The forced Daka price changes helped Venezuela's ruling party, PSUV, win in some of the municipal elections, though the massive sale of goods caused further shortages in the months following the initiative.

During the Christmas shopping season of 2014, the Venezuelan government also launched an initiative called the "Merry Christmas Plan", a plan that involved audits on sellers and the forced reduction of prices that the government found unsuitable. Multiple analysts warned that this may cause a repeat of the outcomes from the Dakazo, where Daka stores in Venezuela are still recovering from shortages caused by the sales. Soon after the initiation of the plan, customers complained that popular children's toys had already been sold out in stores. With President Maduro experiencing record low approval ratings, Reuters noted that the Merry Christmas Plan seemed similar to the strategy of the Dakazo, where President Maduro briefly increased his approval ratings during the Christmas season of 2013. Days later, Reuters called the plan a "reissued 'Dakazo'" after thousands of Venezuelans similarly gathered at Daka stores receiving price reductions of up to 50%, only weeks after some Daka stores reported their first restock since the Dakazo.

==== Rationing and anti-shortage measures ====
In an interview with President Maduro by The Guardian, it was noted that a "significant proportion" of the subsidized basic goods in short supply were being smuggled into Colombia and sold for far higher prices. The Venezuelan government claims that as much as 40% of the basic commodities it subsidizes for the domestic market are being smuggled out of the country, into neighboring countries, like Colombia, where they are sold at much higher prices. However, economists disagree with the Venezuelan government's claim stating that only 10% of subsidized products are smuggled out of the country. In 2014, the Venezuelan government began to limit the quantities of certain items that individuals could purchase per month. Economists say that such measures were due to multiple issues, including an unproductive domestic industry that has been negatively affected by nationalizations and government intervention, and confusing currency controls that made it unable to provide the dollars importers that need to pay for the majority of basic products that enter Venezuela. Gasoline is also rationed in Venezuela allegedly due to smuggling of the subsidized Venezuelan gasoline to Colombia where it is sold for a higher price.

In February 2014, the government stated that it had confiscated more than 3,500 tons of contraband on the border with Colombia—food and fuel which, it said, was intended for "smuggling" or "speculation." The president of the National Assembly, Diosdado Cabello, said that the confiscated food should be given to the Venezuelan people, and should not be "in the hands of these gangsters." In March 2014, President Maduro introduced a new "biometric card" that requires the users fingerprint called Tarjeta de Abastecimiento Seguro for purchases in state-run supermarkets or participating businesses that is allegedly meant to combat smuggling and price speculation. It has been described as being both like loyalty programs and a rationing card. In May 2014, months after the card was introduced, it was reported that 503,000 Venezuelans had registered for the card. In August 2014, it was reported that the Tarjeta de Abastecimiento Seguro failed to go past the trial phase and that another "biometric card" was going to be developed according to President Maduro.

Soon thereafter, in August 2014, President Maduro announced the creation of a new voluntary fingerprint scanning system that was allegedly aimed at combating food shortages and smuggling. The Venezuelan government announced that 17,000 troops would be deployed along its border with Colombia, where they will assist in closing down traffic each night to strengthen anti-smuggling efforts. The effect of the nightly closings will be assessed after 30 days.

Venezuelan consumers mainly had negative feelings toward the fingerprint rationing system, stating that it created longer lines; especially when fingerprint machines malfunctioned, and that the system does nothing to relieve shortages because it only overlooks the large economic changes that the country needed to make. Following the announcement of the fingerprint system, protests broke out in multiple cities in Venezuela denouncing the proposed move. The MUD opposition coalition called on Venezuelans to reject the new fingerprinting system and called on supporters to hold a nationwide cacerolazo that were primarily heard in traditionally government opposing areas. Students in Zulia state also demonstrated against the proposed system. Lorenzo Mendoza, the president of Empresas Polar, Venezuela's largest food producer, expressed his disagreement with the proposed system, saying it would penalize 28 million Venezuelans for the smuggling carried out by just a few. Days after the announcement, the Venezuelan government scaled back its plans on implementing the new system, saying the system is now voluntary and is only for 23 basic goods.

Despite the displeasure of the system, in an October 2014 Wall Street Journal article, it was reported that the fingerprint rationing system expanded to more state owned markets.

=== Government spending ===
El Nuevo Herald reported that SEBIN has cut down its work due to the lack of money limiting their work to the monitoring of "potential external threats" and asked for Cuban intelligence agents to return to Venezuela.

However, according to El Nacional, funding for "official propaganda" increased with 65% of Venezuela's Ministry of Popular Power for Communication and Information (MINCI) funds being used for propaganda in 2014. Allocation of funds to MINCI were over 0.5 billion Venezuelan bolívares. For the 2015 Venezuelan government budget, the Venezuelan government designated 1.8 billion bolívares for the promotion of the supposed achievements made by the government of Nicolas Maduro, which was more than the 1.3 billion bolívares designated by the Ministry of Popular Power for Interior, Justice and Peace for public safety of the most populous Venezuelan municipality, Libertador Bolivarian Municipality. Funding for domestic propaganda increased 139.3% in the 2015 budget with 73.7% of the Ministry of Communication and Information's budget compromising for official propaganda.

=== Income and poverty ===
==== Income ====
Real minimum wage in Venezuela has dropped significantly during Maduro's presidency with the minimum wage sinking from approximately $360 per month in 2012 to $31 in March 2015 (applying the weakest legal exchange rate) . At Venezuelan currency black market's values, the minimum wage was just $20 per month.

==== Poverty ====
The Romanian writer Emil Cioran once wrote, 'Only those are happy who never think.' I think Venezuelans are trying to not think too much about how poor they have become. They're too busy queuing and trying to make ends meet.

— Asdrúbal Oliveros, economist

According to the Instituto Nacional de Estadística, President Maduro entered his term as president with a poverty rate around 30%. The state-owned oil company, PDVSA, reduced its funding on social projects by 21% in 2013 due to the financial crisis that Venezuela was facing.

Estimates of poverty by the United Nations Economic Commission for Latin America and the Caribbean (ECLAC) and Luis Pedro España, a sociologist at the Universidad Católica Andrés Bello, show an increase of poverty in Venezuela. ECLAC showed a 2013 poverty rate of 32% while Pedro España calculated a 2015 rate of 48% with a poverty rate of 70% possible by the end of 2015. According to Venezuelan NGO PROVEA, by the end of 2015, there would be the same number of Venezuelans living in poverty as there was in 2000, reversing the advancements against poverty by Hugo Chávez. By November 2015, a multi university study found that about 73% of households and 76% of Venezuelans were living in poverty.

== See also ==
- 2014 Venezuelan protests
- Economy of Venezuela
- Crisis in Venezuela
