= 2013 Venezuelan municipal elections =

- 8 December 2013

337 mayors 2,523 councillors
- Registered: 19,066,431
- Turnout: 58.36% (▼7.09pp)
Alliance	GPPSB	MUD
Popular vote	5,216,522	4,373,910
Percentage	48.69%	39.34%
Swing	▼3.41pp	▼2.48pp
Mayors	256	81
Mayors +/–	▼16	▲27
- Red denotes states won by the Great Patriotic Pole. Blue denotes those won by the Coalition for Democratic Unity.

Municipal elections were held in Venezuela to elect 337 mayors and 2,455 local councillors for their respective 2013-2017 terms. Originally planned for 14 April 2013, due to the death of President Hugo Chávez and the announcement of a new presidential election to be held on that date, the municipal elections were rescheduled for 8 December 2013. That date, 8 December 2013, was later announced by the president of the National Electoral Council, Tibisay Lucena.

== Conduct ==
President Nicolás Maduro, Chávez's successor and head of the GPP, utilized public resources to support GPP candidates. Public resources included workers, facilities and government funding.

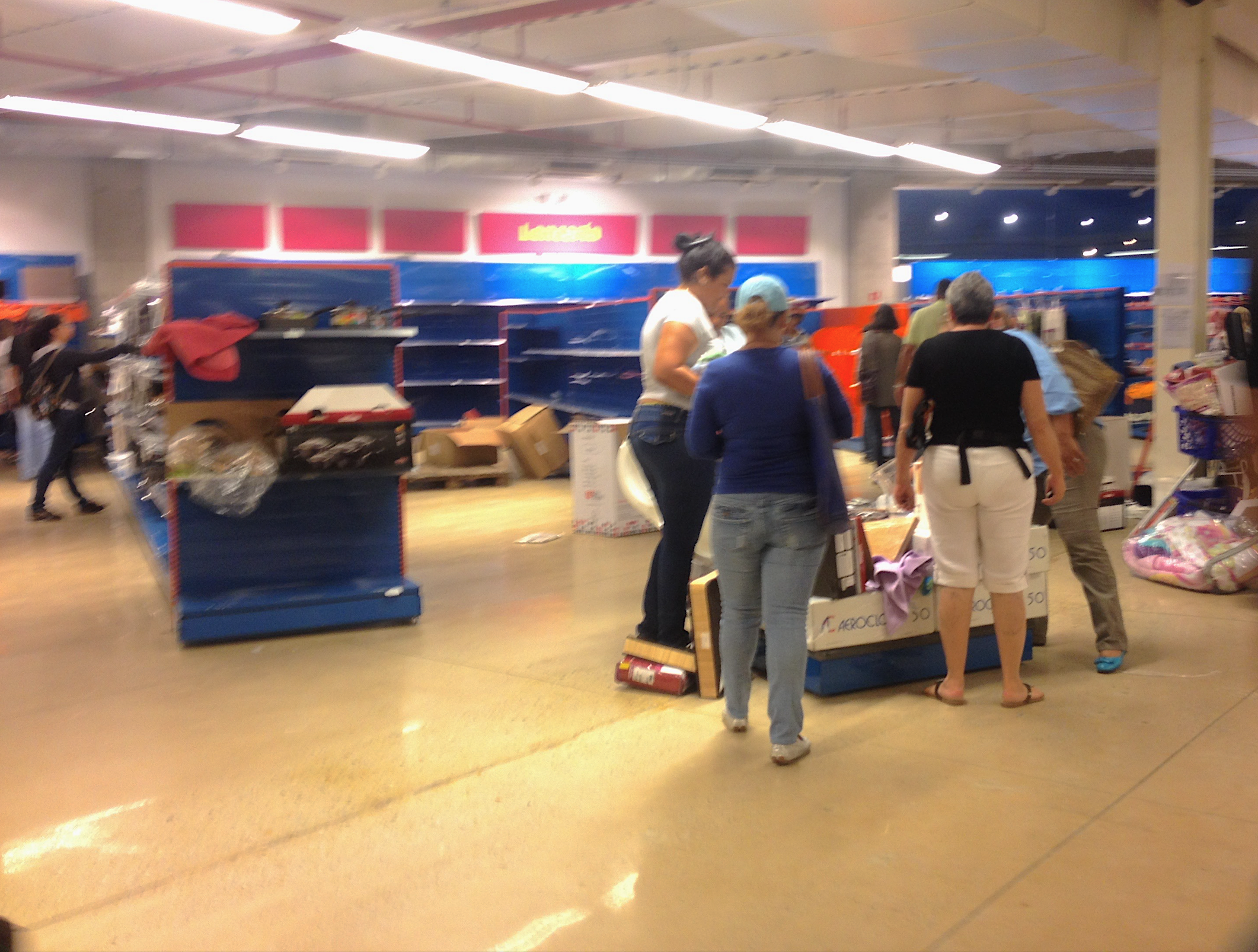
Individuals grabbing items during El Dakazo

To build support for GPP candidates, President Maduro declared on 8 November 2013 the military occupation of Daka consumer stores which later evolved into similar operations involving other stores. The government forced price cuts upon private businesses and as a result, GPP saw increased approval. Head of the Superior Organ for the Defense of the Economy, Hebert García Plaza, later promised that "all the Venezuelan people will have the capacity to obtain a plasma television and a refrigerator of the latest generation". The announcement of lowered prices sparked looting in multiple cities across Venezuela.

As a result of El Dakazo, shortages in Venezuela intensified because businesses could not afford to import more products that were sold for artificially low prices. In November 2014 one year later, some Daka stores still remained empty following the events.

== Results ==
It was announced on 20 August 2013 by the National Electoral Council that there are 19,167,416 voters, of which there are 18,952,292 Venezuelan nationals and 215,124 foreign residents with at least 10 years residency; however, only 19,066,431 voters will be entitled to vote, as 100,985 are Venezuelans residing abroad who have no voting rights for local elections.
