= Súper Bigote y su mano de hierro =

Venezuelan animated series

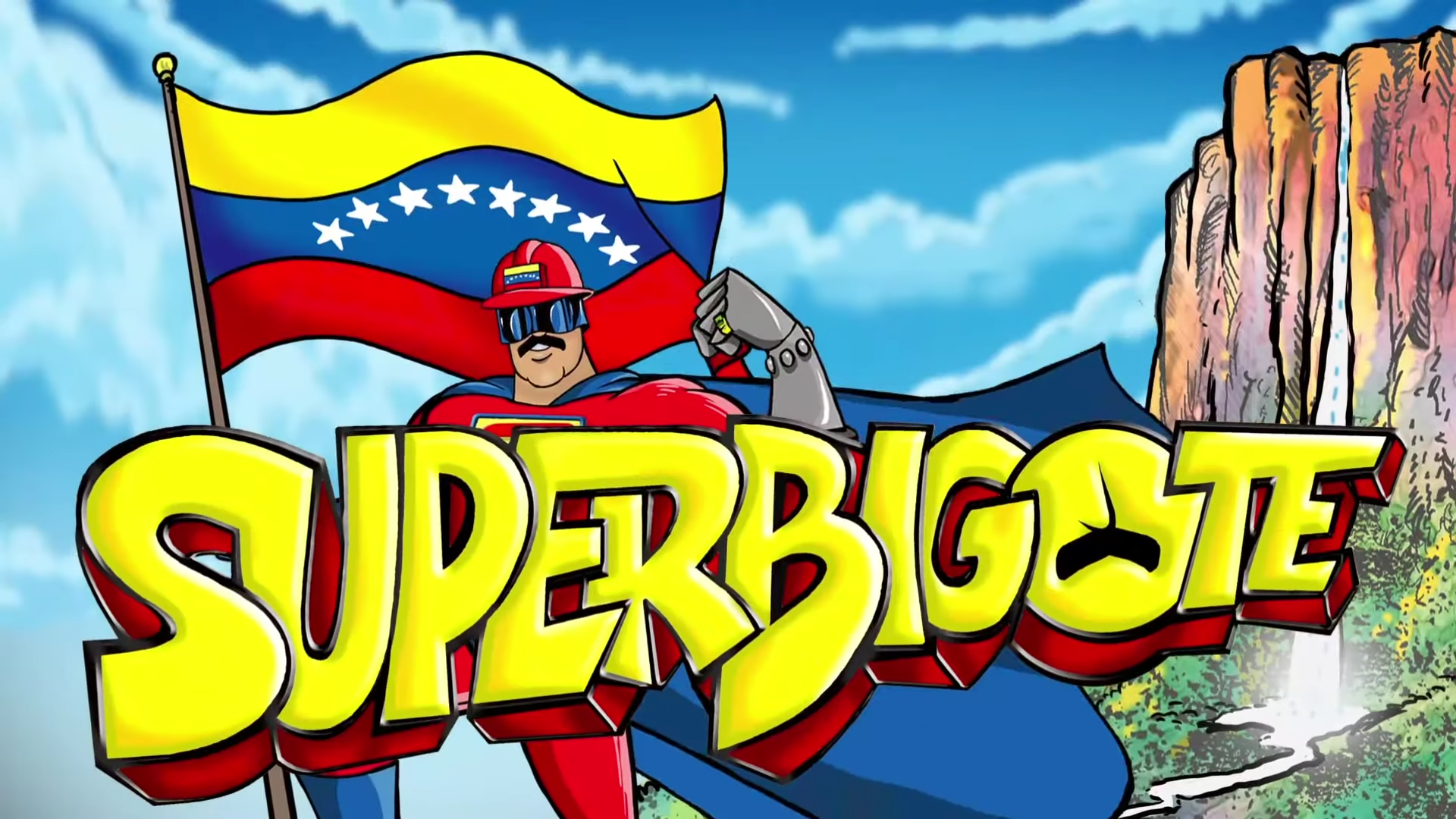
- Also known as: Súper Bigote
- Genre: Animated series
- Country of origin: Venezuela
- Original language: Spanish
- No. of seasons: 2
- No. of episodes: 73

Original release
- Network: Venezolana de Televisión
- Release: December 1, 2021 – February 1, 2026

Súper Bigote y su mano de hierro (lit. 'Super Mustache and his iron hand'), also known simply as Súper Bigote, is a Venezuelan animated television series premiered on the state-run channel Venezolana de Televisión (VTV) on December 1, 2021. It follows the president of Venezuela Nicolás Maduro depicted as Súper Bigote, a superhero that fights against American imperialism and the opposition to his government. The origin of the character dates back to 2019 when Maduro mentioned "not being Superman," following accusations against him by the then president of Ecuador, Lenín Moreno, of being the cause of the protests in Ecuador that year.

The series and its derived products are often regarded as propaganda. After the events of the capture of Nicolás Maduro and Cilia Flores in the early hours of January 3, 2026, and the rise of Delcy Rodríguez as interim president of Venezuela, the series stopped airing in February 2026.

== Description ==
The episodes usually last between one or two minutes on average. By February 2022, the series consisted of six episodes. The series has alluded to events in Venezuela's recent history, such as the 2019 blackouts and problems the country is facing, such as shortages of medical supplies and vaccines. Súper Bigote is also shown facing monsters, such as one who opposes the delivery of vaccines, aliens, or a Frankenstein sent by the CIA. He also associates to characters in the likeness of the country's well-known political opponents. In addition, he has the power to invoke the spirit of Simón Bolívar, whose initials he adopts.

== Characters ==
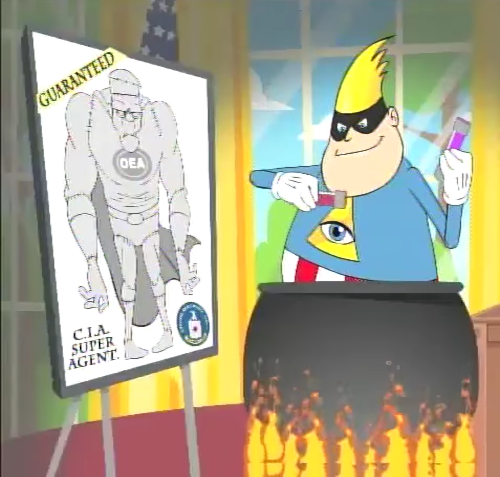
Mr. Odio attempting to create a Frankenstein, which represents the OAS

In the series, the voice actors who play the characters are not credited. For the second season, the number of actors and actresses was reduced, mainly the female characters and the children, who were voiced by the same actor.

- Súper Bigote: He is a representation of Nicolás Maduro as a muscular man with an iron hand. He has a red suit with the initials "SB" on the chest, and a blue cape.
- Súper Cilita: She is a representation of Nicolás Maduro's wife, Cilia Flores. She has glasses, blonde hair, and a suit mostly in shades of red.
- Mr. Odio (Spanglish for Mr. Hate): He is a representation of the American president Donald Trump, who serves as a villain in the series. He has blond hair, a black mask, and a blue suit with the Eye of Providence on the chest. In the second season, another character with a similar role appears, although with an appearance more like that of Uncle Sam.
- Several leaders of the Venezuelan opposition are represented in a satirical way: Henry Ramos Allup and Julio Borges as chicken men, Juan Guaidó and Leopoldo López as puppets, Antonio Ledezma as a vampire, and Henrique Capriles as a mouse dressed as Robin. In one episode, magnate Elon Musk is also parodied as a satanic villain with a desire to take over Venezuela's natural resources.

== Production ==
One week after the 2021 regional elections, the series was released in December. The authorship of the series and its producers have not been made public. It has also not been declared whether its execution has been done with Venezuelan public funds.

=== Background ===
Nicolás Maduro was portrayed as an animated character for the first time in the second season of the series Isla Presidencial, in 2013. Maduro stated in this regard: "Have you already seen Isla Presidencial? Very badly made, that is not my face, nor my mustache, nor my voice. Also, they make me very dumb, I am not that dumb. And very fat." After the Ecuadorian president Lenin Moreno accused Maduro of being behind the protests in Ecuador in 2019, Maduro denied the accusations; "Moreno says that it is my fault, that I move mustaches and topple governments (…) I am not Superman, I am Súper Bigote."

=== Promotion ===
Maduro has promoted the character on social media such as Twitter. For the 2022 carnival, communal councils made Súper Bigote costumes for children, according to a VTV report. On July 5, 2022, during the Armed Forces parade for Venezuela's Independence Day, an inflatable replica of Súper Bigote was part of the event.

=== Soundtrack ===
One of the most recurrent musical pieces of the series is a rendition of "Indestructible", a salsa classic by American musician Ray Barretto.

== Derived products ==
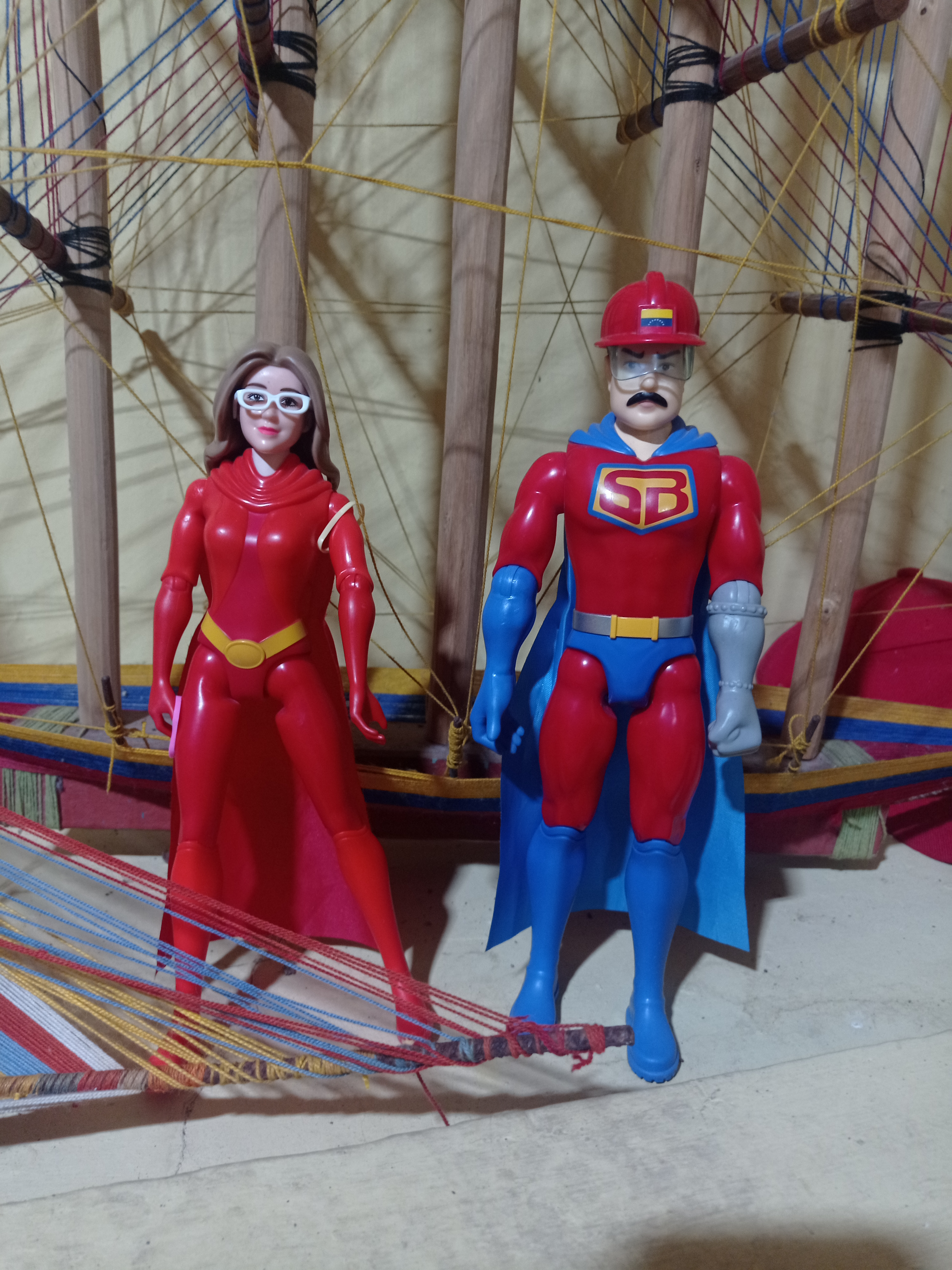
Action figures of Súper Bigote and Súper Cilita

Due to the amplification of the Government of Venezuela's use of the character, various types of products have been created with the image of Nicolás Maduro as Súper Bigote, mainly for the use of Venezuelan children or for political propaganda, among which are:

- Comics: The release of a Súper Bigote comic was spread on social media, mainly contrasting the character fighting against a group of Spanish streamers (such as Jordi Wild) as enemies of Venezuela and calling them fascists.
- Action figures: During Christmas 2022, Maduro's government gave Súper Bigote and Súper Cilita toys as gifts for children in the CLAP boxes. According to vice president Delcy Rodríguez, the total number of distributed toys was 13 million. The companies Emvepro and Industrias Venetech are responsible for their production. The newspaper El Mundo described this as a "child indoctrination campaign," part of the "cult of personality" around Maduro.
- Sporting events: The Ministerio del Poder Popular para el Deporte (Ministry of People's Power for Sports) announced on July 14, 2024, the creation of the Caracas 2024 Súper Bigote League for men and women between the ages of 18 and 30, from the Venezuelan capital.
- Social missions: In September 2022, the governor of Carabobo State, Rafael Lacava, announced the implementation of a social health mission called "0800 Súper Bigote," which was launched in May 2023 with the aim of guaranteeing equitable and direct access to medicines for all Venezuelans. In July 2024, at a campaign event before the presidential elections, Nicolás Maduro announced the nationwide implementation of this social mission through the platform of the Homeland card.
- Costumes: During the 2022 carnivals, officials and entities of the Government of Venezuela delivered Súper Bigote costumes to Venezuelan children, causing the initiative to be accused of using Venezuelan children as part of their Bolivarian propaganda. Although this initiative with the character Súper Bigote was carried out for the first time in 2022, it has been mentioned that since the establishment of the Bolivarian Revolution as a state political ideology, similar costumes have been made previously, for example, costumes of the then president Hugo Chávez.
- School materials: During the ExpoFeria Plan Escolar 2022-2023, which took place at the Caracas Military Circle in September 2022, a series of school notebooks featuring images of Súper Bigote and Dracula (a representative character of the governor of Carabobo State, Rafael Lacava) were presented, which would be given to children and adolescents in the country for school use.

== Reception ==
=== Positive reception ===
Supporters of Madurismo consider that the animated series and other products related to the character are "not a cult of personality, this is love for the Homeland" and that "he is a leader, fighting alongside us and we support him." Rosa Rodríguez, a member of a communal council, considered that the giving of Súper Bigote toys "was not a campaign, but a humanitarian gesture toward the children," and that in this way, they would learn about the Bolivarian Revolution.

=== Critical reception ===
The series generated debate on social media and has been parodied through memes. During Holy Week of 2024, effigies of Súper Bigote were burned in the Lara State, alluding to the burning of Judas.

Historian Elías Pino Iturrieta described the series as "A magnet, something that grabs attention, that distracts, that says you are not living in hell," adding: "It is a circus trick, genius as marketing, but deplorable as a show of contempt for the people." Sociologist Anaís López analyzed: "It is about positioning the Chavista narrative that everything that happens is the product of a conspiracy between a very specific group of opposition leaders and the White House, in a less heavy-handed format than their speeches."

The series has been characterized by analysts as a propaganda tool of the Maduro government, with the show adapting its content to reflect tensions with the United States under Maduro's Presidency, including episodes in which the titular character exchanges his superhero costume for a military uniform.

== Broadcast ==
In addition to being broadcast on the public channel Venezolana de Televisión (VTV), the series was previously available on demand on VTV IP and Miraflores TV.

== See also ==
- Hugo Chávez's cult of personality
- Chávez eyes
