= Madurismo =

Venezuelan political movement since 2013

Madurismo, also called Chavo-Madurismo, is a political movement and a faction of Chavismo that emerged in Venezuela, based on the political ideas and thinking of Nicolás Maduro who served as the president of Venezuela from 2013 until the 2026 United States intervention in Venezuela, and represented the Bolivarian Revolution. It was initially based on the defense and continuation of Chavismo, of which Hugo Chávez was the architect and principal exponent until his death, and which was itself based on Bolivarianism and Marxism. However, over time it has begun to focus less on the figure of Chávez and more on the figure of Maduro.

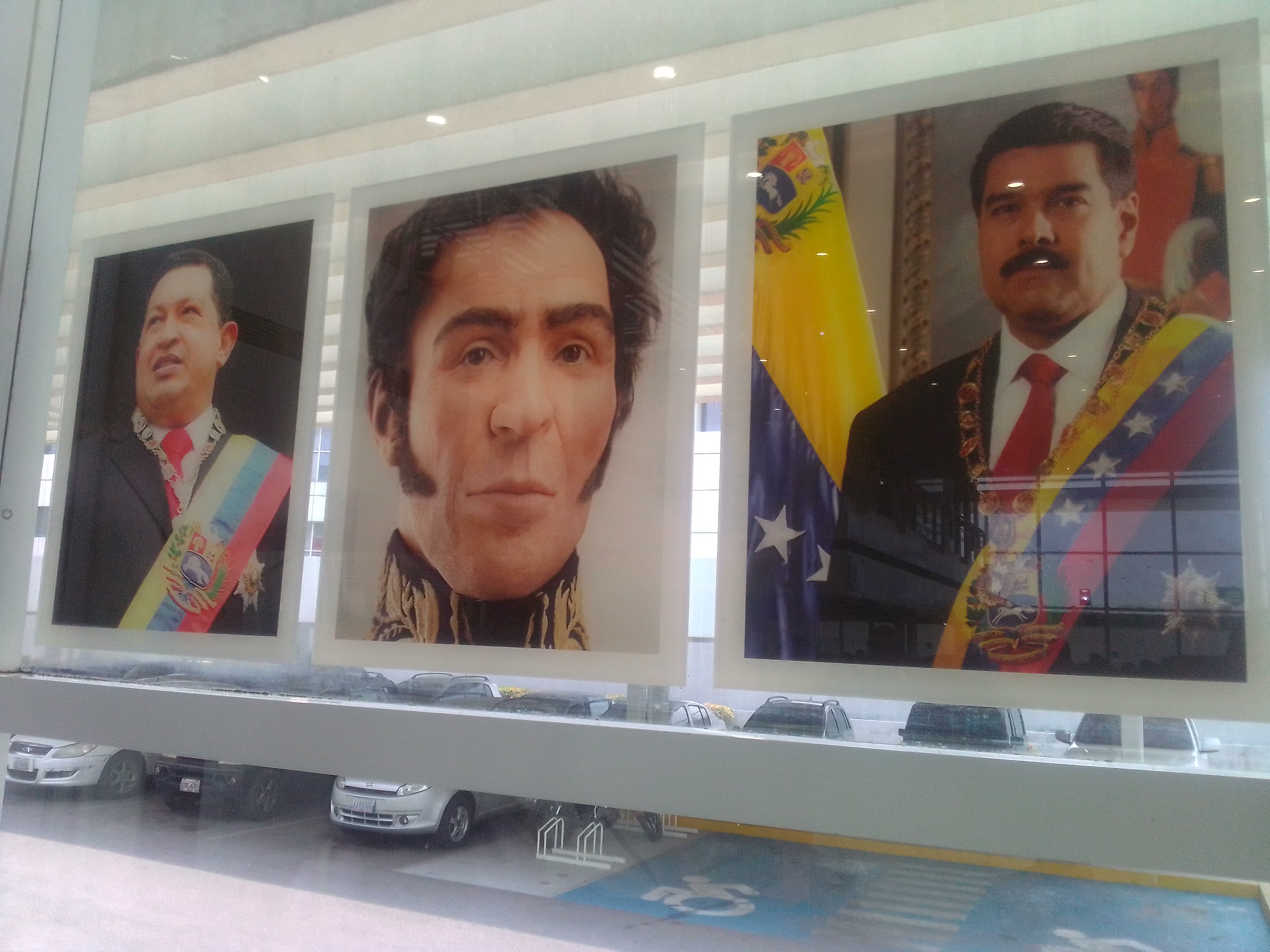
Portrait of Hugo Chávez, Simón Bolívar, and Nicolás Maduro

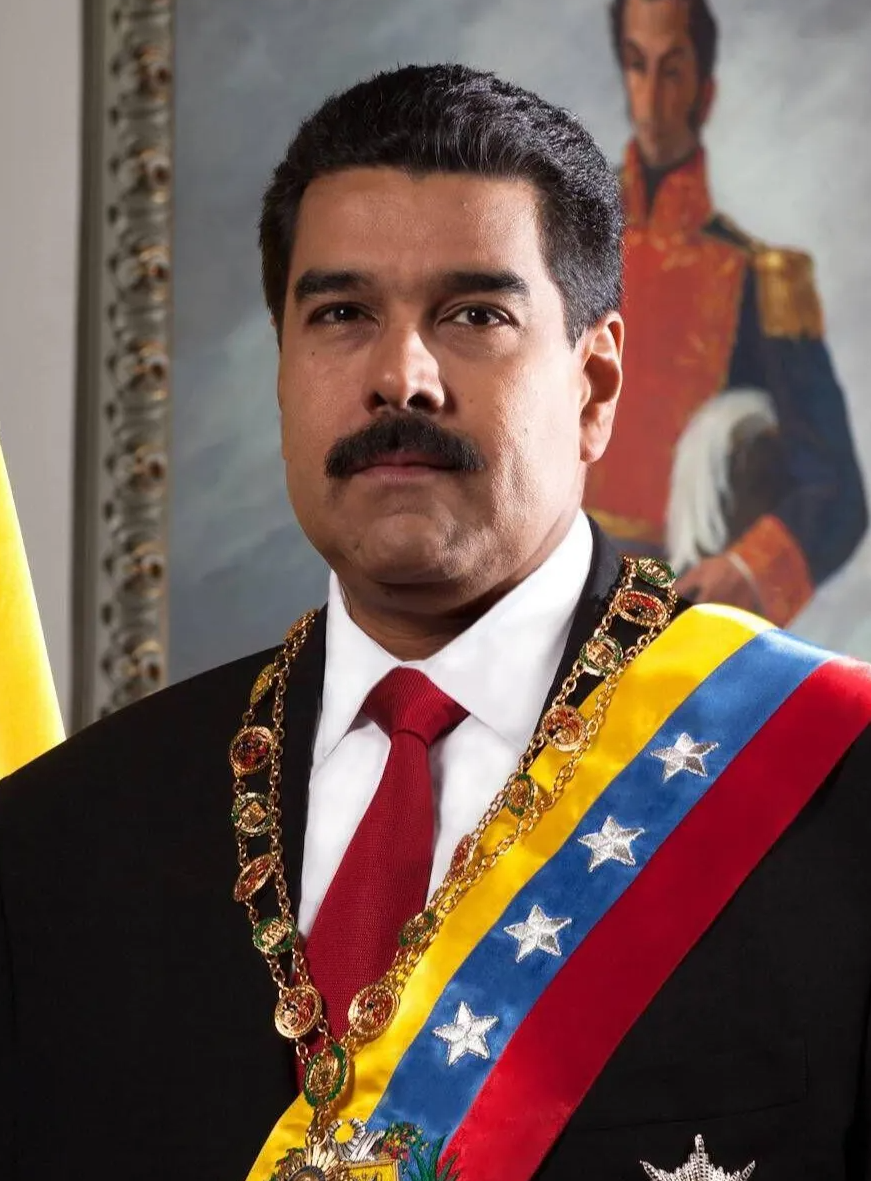
Nicolás Maduro in 2013

Although in 2013 Nicolás Maduro denied the existence of 'Madurismo,' and although he adopted elements of the earlier Chavismo in terms of ideology and some political leaders that make them similar, it is an independent term used by ministers under both Chávez and Maduro to refer to their members, style of government, and the policies they have implemented.

== Etymology ==
The term "Madurismo" (Madurism) was coined by the Venezuelan and international media following Nicolás Maduro's assumption of the presidency in 2013 to describe his specific faction, governance style, and ideological adaptation of Chavismo.

The term "Madurismo" is mostly used by opponents of Maduro, including dissident Chavismo, since Madurismo itself is considered the same as Chavismo, so it is unusual for someone to identify as a Madurista.

== Characteristics ==
=== Criticism from Opposition Chavismo ===
The Chavista opposition to Maduro has become particularly notable since 2017. Prominent Chavista figures who oppose Maduro, such as Rafael Ramírez, Juan Barreto, Walter Martínez, Andrés Izarra, Jorge Giordani, Mary Pili Hernández, Eva Golinger, and María Alejandra Díaz, among others, have argued that Madurismo and Chavismo are antagonistic and opposing currents, pointing to ideological contradictions, differences in the way Chávez and Maduro governed (primarily criticizing Madurista authoritarianism), the latter's shift toward right-wing policies, and his antagonism toward Chavistas critical of his administration. In particular, Andrés Izarra stated in 2023: "Madurismo uses corruption to control the ambitions of the groups that make it up. It cannot punish it, because Madurismo is corruption. It is a government structured around corruption."

Óscar Figuera, the current leader of the Communist Party of Venezuela, stated that Nicolás Maduro's government "is not Chavista for us; it is a neoliberal government. Chávez came to reverse the neoliberal package. A neoliberal government cannot be Chavista." He also said: "[Yes,] we observe an increasingly authoritarian drift in Nicolás Maduro's government that corresponds to the implementation of neoliberal policy packages, because those who control power have to use repressive force to maintain control over the people."

=== Militarism ===
According to Rafael Ramírez, a former minister under both Chávez and Maduro, Madurismo is sustained by a "military elite". During the first Maduro administration, one-third of the country's ministries were headed by active-duty or retired military officers.

=== Tenets ===
Madurismo represents an ideological evolution of Chavismo, adapting classical 21st-century socialist rhetoric to ensure political survival amid severe economic and diplomatic isolation. While retaining the foundational symbols of its predecessor, the movement is defined by several core tenets:

- Pragmatic Economic Liberalization: Unlike the strict state-controlled model of Hugo Chávez, Madurismo permits de facto dollarization, eases price and currency controls, and actively courts private capital to bypass international sanctions.
- Institutional Consolidation: The ideology prioritizes regime survival through the systematic neutralization of political opposition, electoral manipulation, and the centralization of state power via parallel legislative bodies.
- Military-Civilian Alliance: The administration relies heavily on the armed forces, granting military elites extensive control over strategic sectors of the economy, including oil distribution, mining, and food imports.
- Anti-Imperialist Rhetoric: Domestically, the political narrative attributes Venezuela's hyperinflation and humanitarian crisis entirely to Western sanctions, using external pressure to justify the restriction of civil liberties.

=== Cult of personality ===
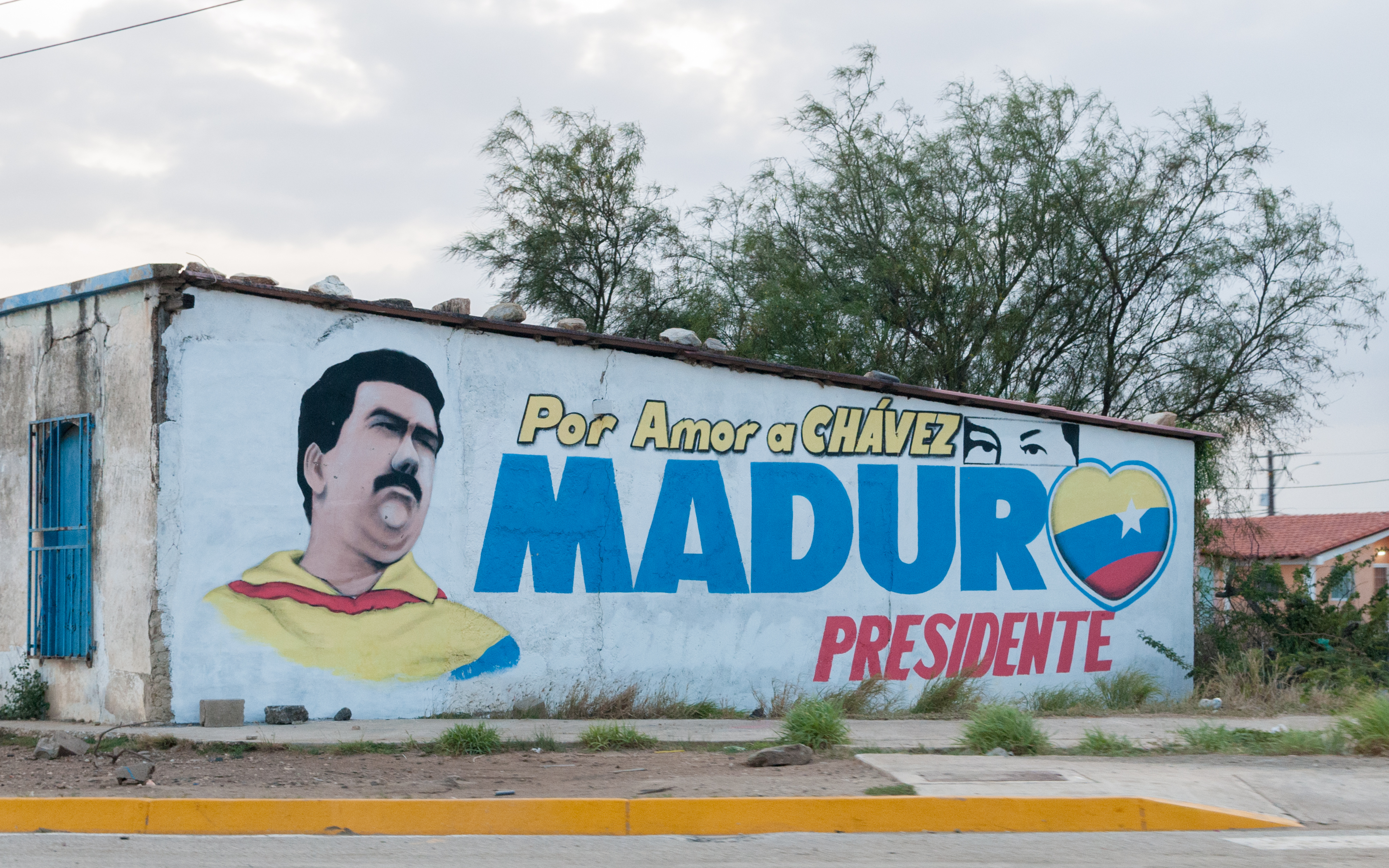
A mural of Nicolás Maduro, saying "For the love of Chávez. Maduro (for) President." with the popular "Chávez eyes" visible.

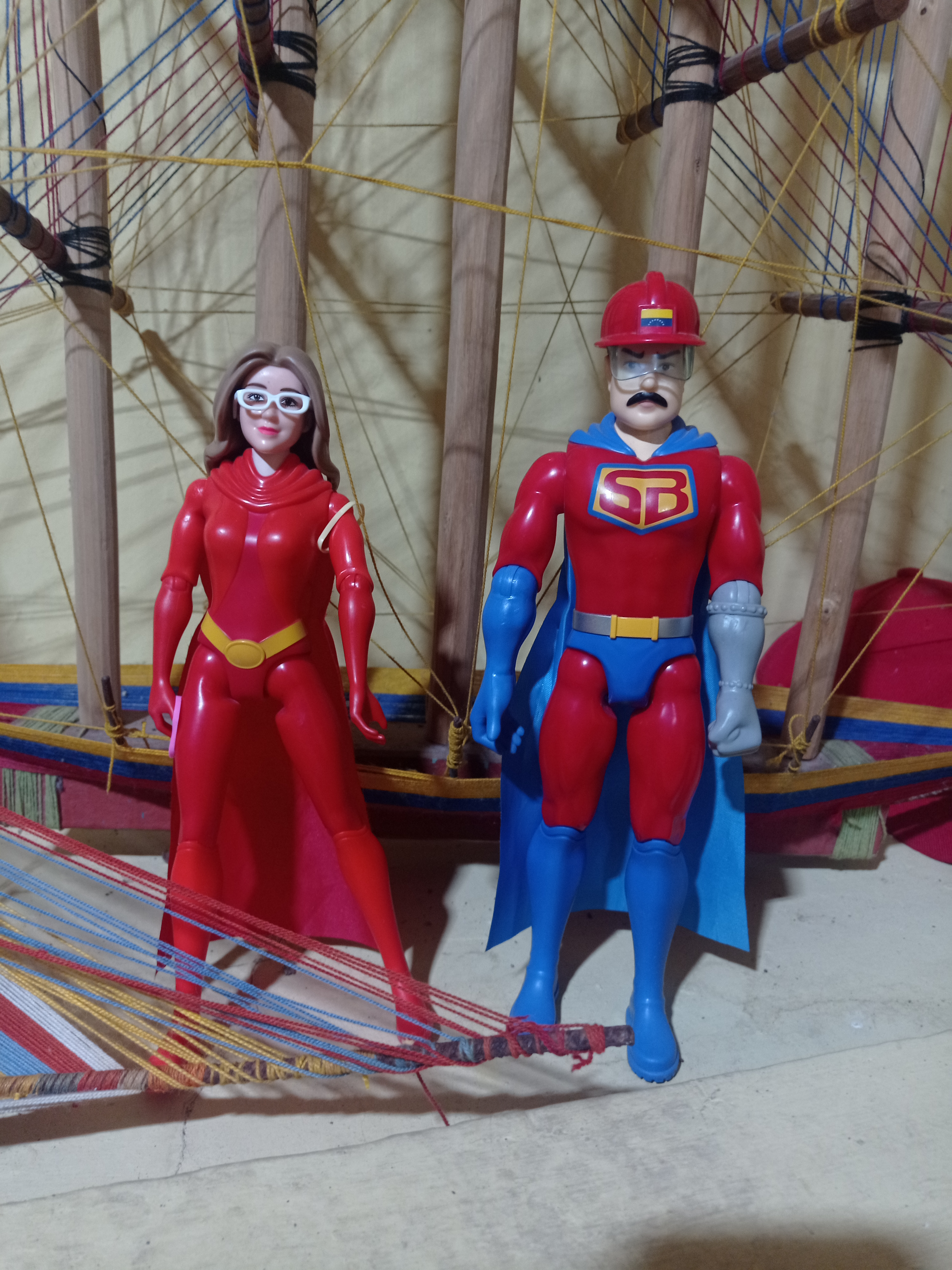
Action figures of Súper Bigote (based on Maduro) and Súper Cilita (based on Cilia Flores)

Just like his predecessor, Maduro maintained a cult of personality, framing himself as the "Son of Chávez," dominating public media with heroic iconography, such as the Súper Bigote y su mano de hierro cartoon, and flooding urban landscapes with official murals and billboards. Following Maduro's ousting during the 2026 U.S. intervention, Maduro's cult of personality was systematically erased by authorities.

== Relationship with other ideologies ==
Nicolás Maduro declared in 2013, "This project is Chavista," and stated that the movements on which it was based were "Chavismo and Bolivarianism."

=== Chavismo ===
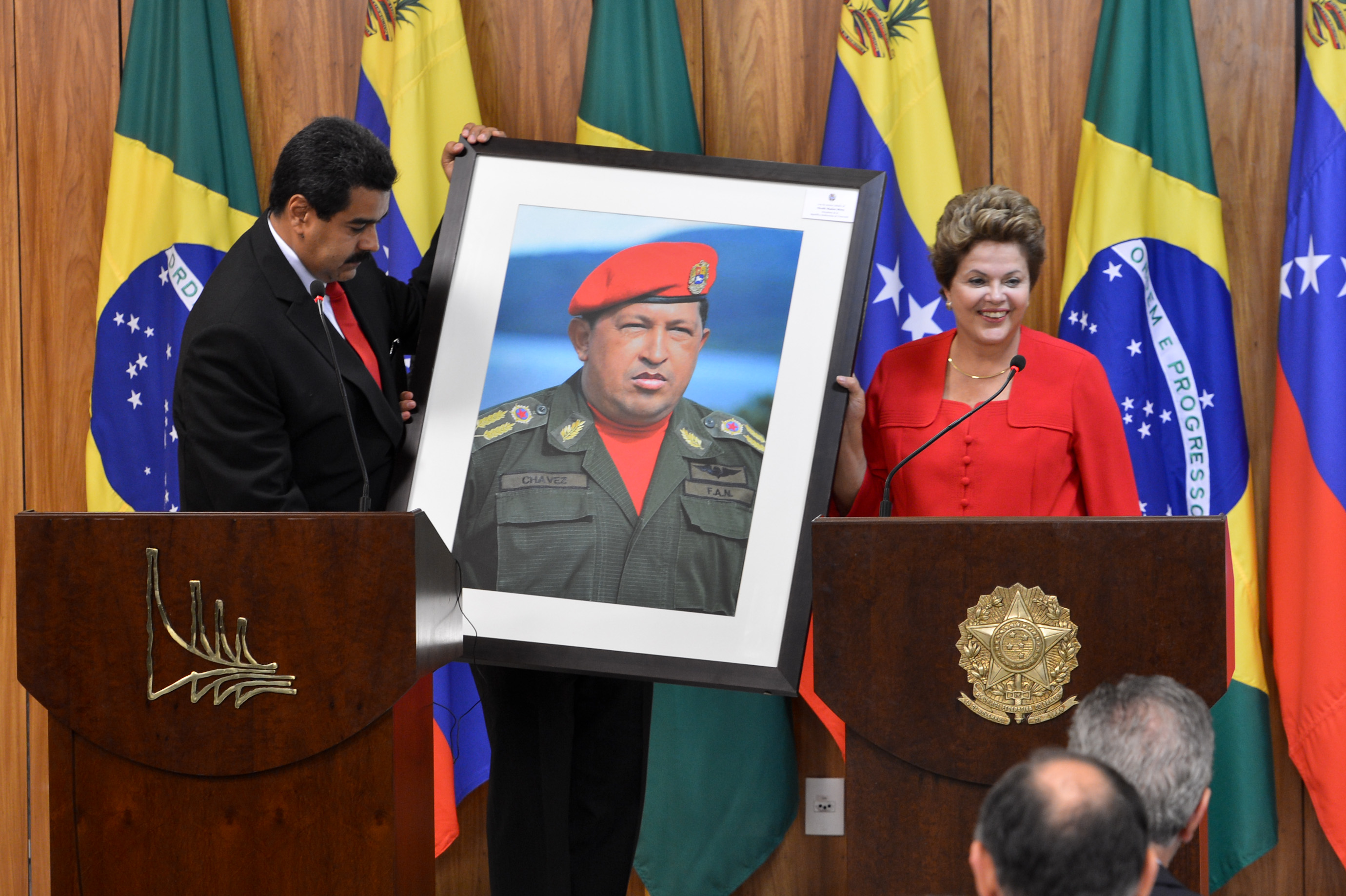
Maduro presents Dilma Rousseff with a portrait of Chávez.

Hugo Chávez was the leader of the Bolivarian Revolution until his death in 2013, and he designated his vice president, Nicolás Maduro, as his successor. In 2013, Maduro denied that there was or would be a "Madurismo," however, former Chavista president Diosdado Cabello said in 2015 that "Maduro has tried to create the figure of Madurismo." On that occasion, Maduro declared that "we are, have been, and must be revolutionaries, Bolivarians, patriots, and Chavistas," and stated that his government's project was based on Chávez's plan for Venezuela and the Constitution of Venezuela of 1999.

Despite these statements, Maduro later publicly sought to change the Constitution proposed by the constituent assembly aligned with Chávez in 1999. To this end, he decreed the 2017 elections, through which a National Constituent Assembly was established.

Nicolás Maduro has continued Chávez's rhetorical discourse about an economic war, describing foreign policies as being aimed at hindering the national economy.

Rafael Ramírez Carreño, a former minister under both Chávez and Maduro, described "Madurismo" in 2019 as distinct from "Chavismo."

Former Chávez and Maduro minister Andrés Izarra wrote on Twitter in 2022: "To refound Chavismo, Madurismo must first be defeated."

In a 2023 interview, Izarra stated: "The political subject of Madurismo is its mafia-like elite, while the political subject of Chavismo is the people and its legal foundations; Chavismo's political project is embodied in the national Constitution and the Plan de la Patria. It has nothing to do with what Madurismo stands for, which is remaining in power indefinitely and profiting from it."

=== Fascism ===
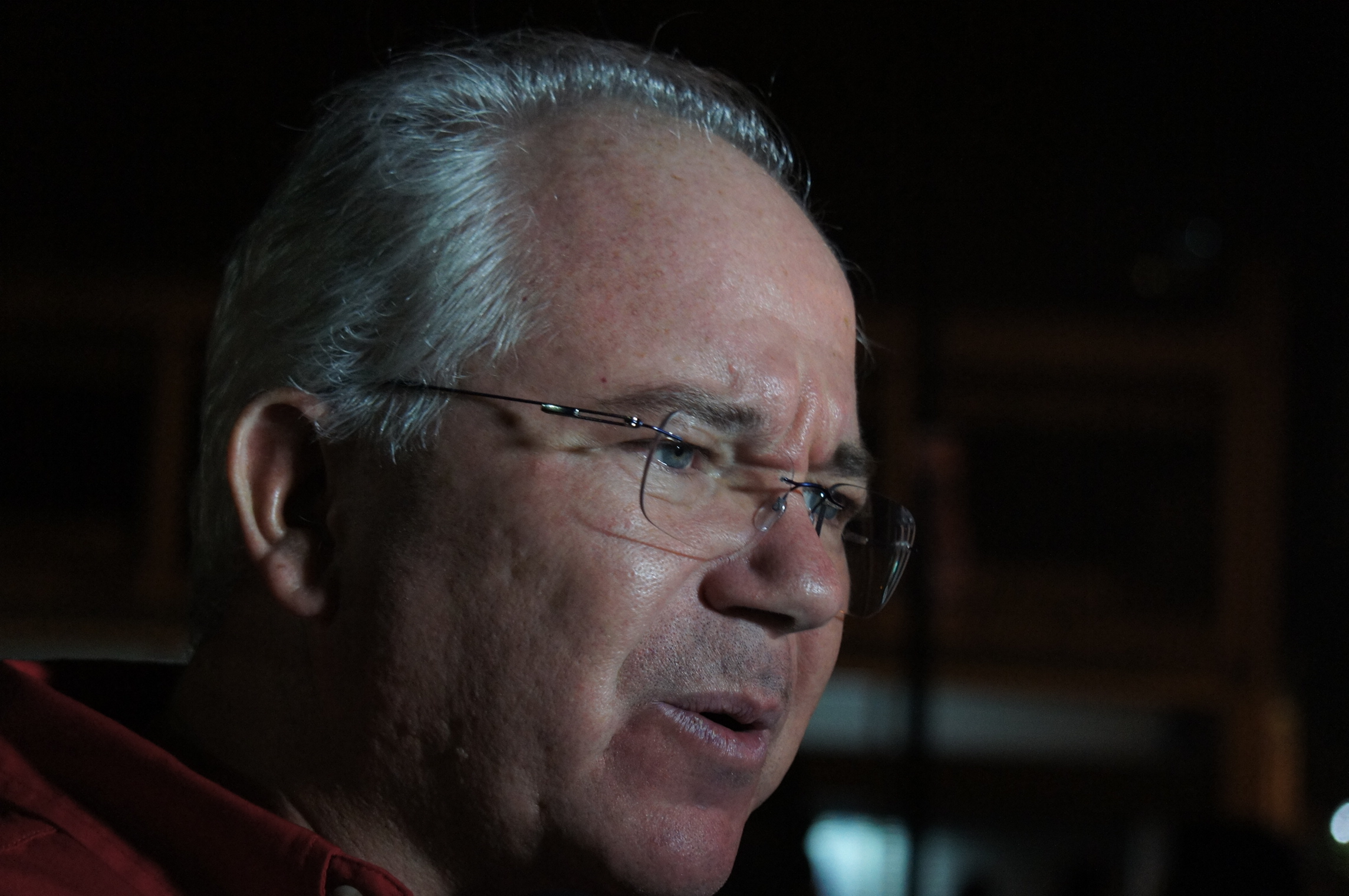
Former Chávez and Maduro minister Rafael Ramírez urged Nicolás Maduro in 2022 to distance himself from fascism.

Maduro's government describes itself as anti-fascist. However, politicians ranging from the left and Venezuelan social democracy to the Spanish right, together with the OAS, have associated Maduro and his government's policies with fascism.

Argentine economist Alberto Benegas Lynch, a figure on the political right, declared in 2017: "The extreme fascism of dictator Nicolás Maduro has just been confirmed by his proposal for the monstrosity of a so-called Constituent Assembly, in the style of Benito Mussolini with his well-known corporations replacing the republican Parliament."

Former minister Rafael Ramírez described as "fascism" Diosdado Cabello's intention to request the list of signatories for the 2022 recall referendum against Maduro; former senator and former governor Antonio Ledezma declared in 2024, in the context of the approval of the Law Against Fascism (which authorizes disqualification from public office for anyone considered a fascist): "Maduro thinks, speaks, and acts like a fascist; therefore, there is no doubt that he is a thoroughgoing fascist"; Isabel Díaz Ayuso, member of the regional legislature and president of the Community of Madrid, declared that same year that "causing the exodus of 8 million people" is "similar to fascism."

The Organization of American States (OAS) stated in 2024 that the Organic Law for the Defense of Guayana Esequiba promoted by Nicolás Maduro (under which Venezuela declares Guayana Esequiba to be another state of the country and labels as traitors those who support Guyana, making them ineligible for public office) was "fascist," as it was based on claims of external threats and because it "fulfills its objectives of internal repression."

=== Neoliberalism ===
Although Maduro's government enacted a law prohibiting neoliberal thought, the Communist Party of Venezuela and the newspaper La Izquierda Diario have asserted that Maduro holds a neoliberal political ideology.

According to Antulio Rosales, professor of Political Science at York University (Canada), speaking to BBC: "It is a system in which private capital is allowed to enrich itself while, at the same time, the social, economic, and political rights of citizens are undermined in order to favor the governing elites' continued hold on power."

== Fall of Madurismo ==
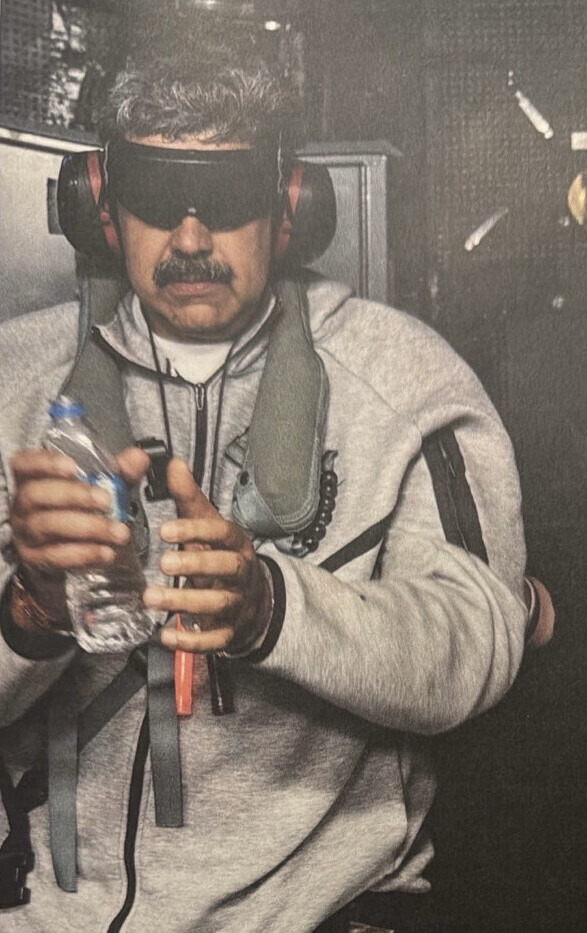
Nicolás Maduro aboard the USS Iwo Jima

Following the overthrow of Maduro during Operation Absolute Resolve, vice president Delcy Rodríguez assumed the presidency, and took steps to remove Madurismo.

Over a period of a few months, Rodríguez reshuffled roughly 40% of her cabinet, replacing 17 ministers and updating military leadership to install her own loyalists. Powerful Maduro loyalists, such as long-serving Defense Minister Vladimir Padrino López and Attorney General Tarek William Saab, were stripped of their posts. Lucrative government contracts granted to Maduro's son, Nicolás Maduro Guerra were canceled, and members of his extended family were sidelined to limit their influence.

This consolidation was further highlighted when Venezuela’s Minister of Industry and National Production, Alex Saab, was also captured in February 2026 in a joint operation by American and Venezuelan intelligence agencies. In May 2026, he was deported to the US. Maduro's cult of personality was also systematically erased by authorities, with murals and billboards of the former Venezuelan president being painted over, and the Súper Bigote y su mano de hierro show being cancelled.
