= Chavismo =

Left-wing political ideology in Venezuela

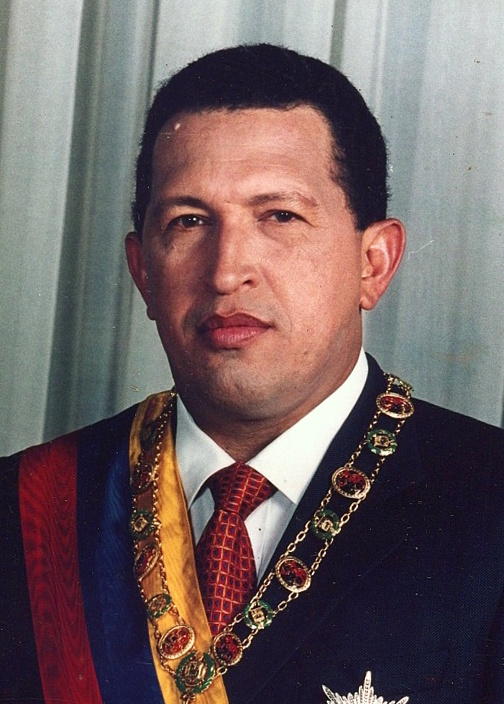
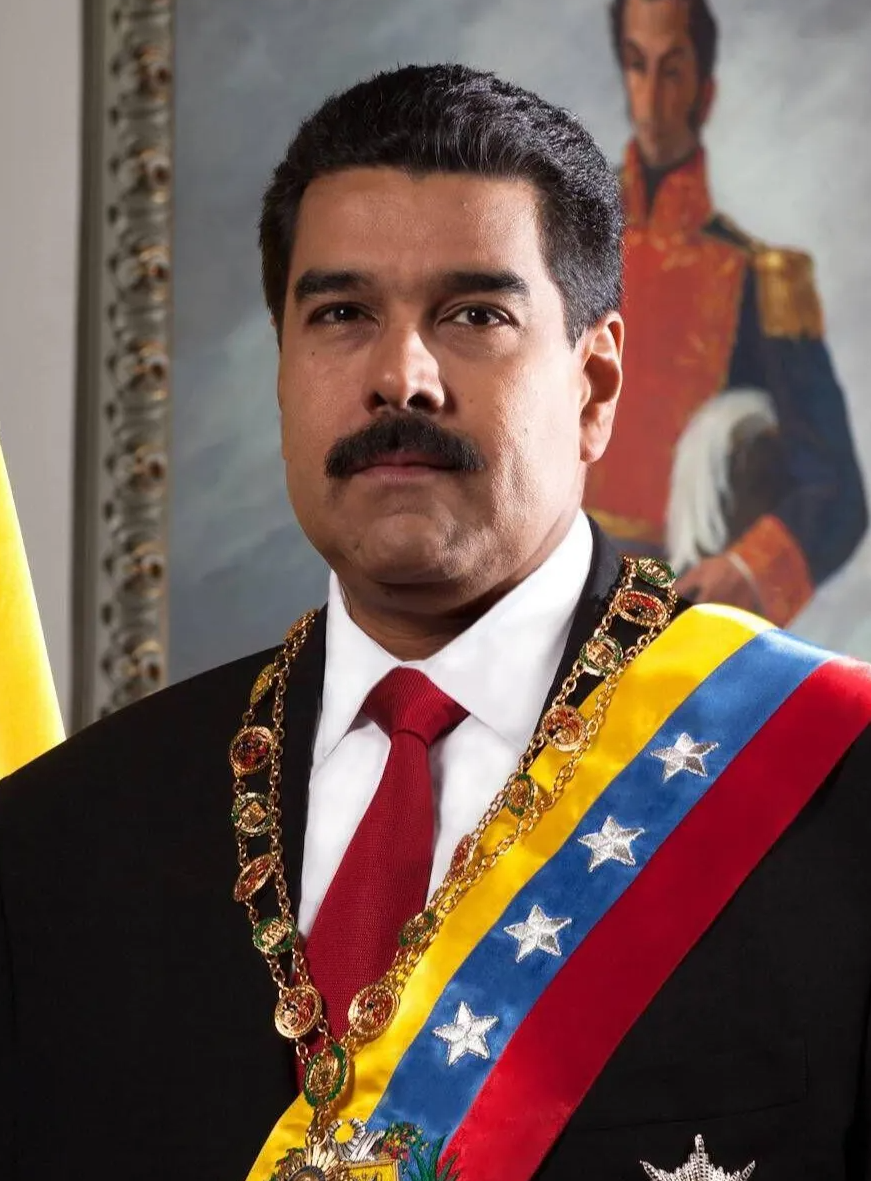
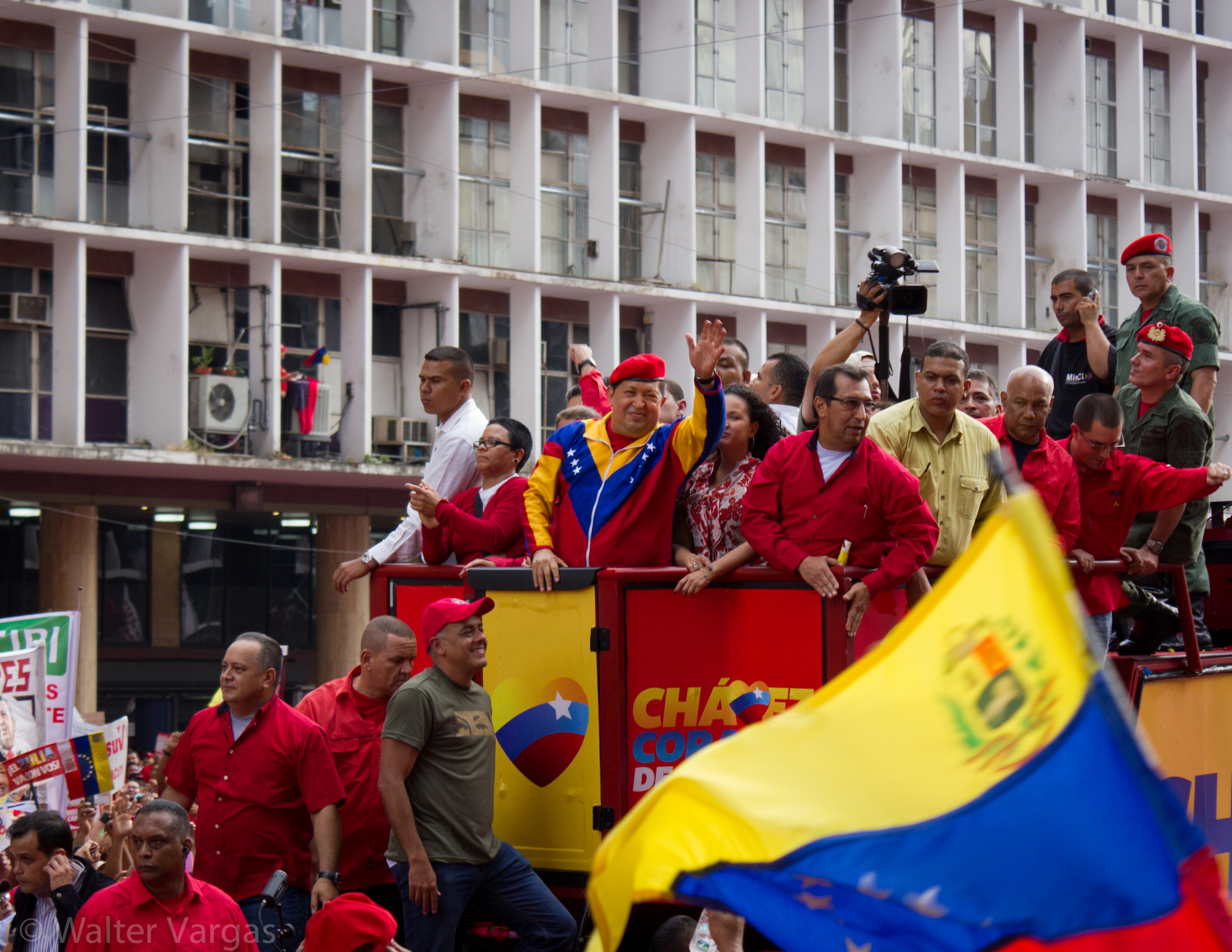
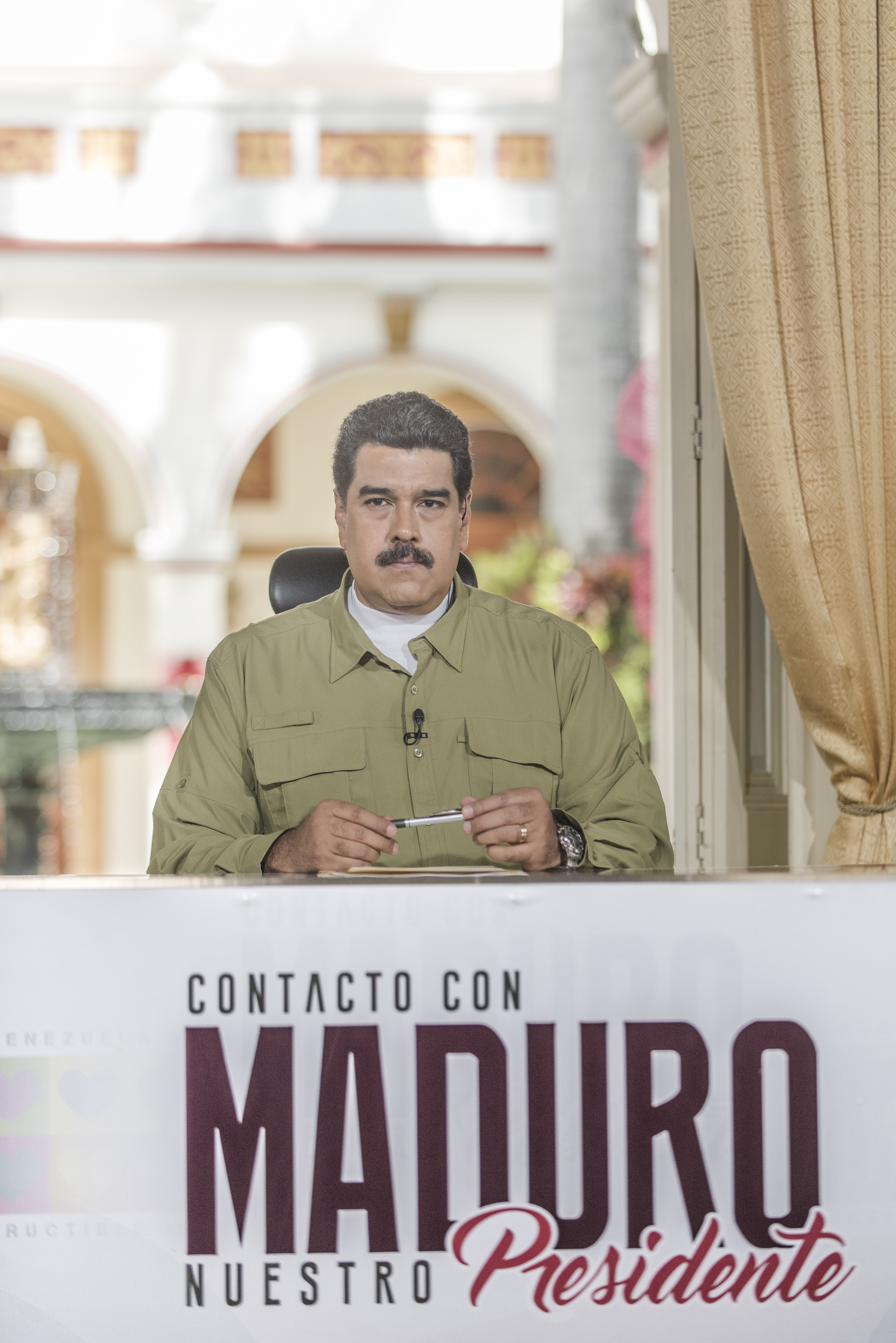
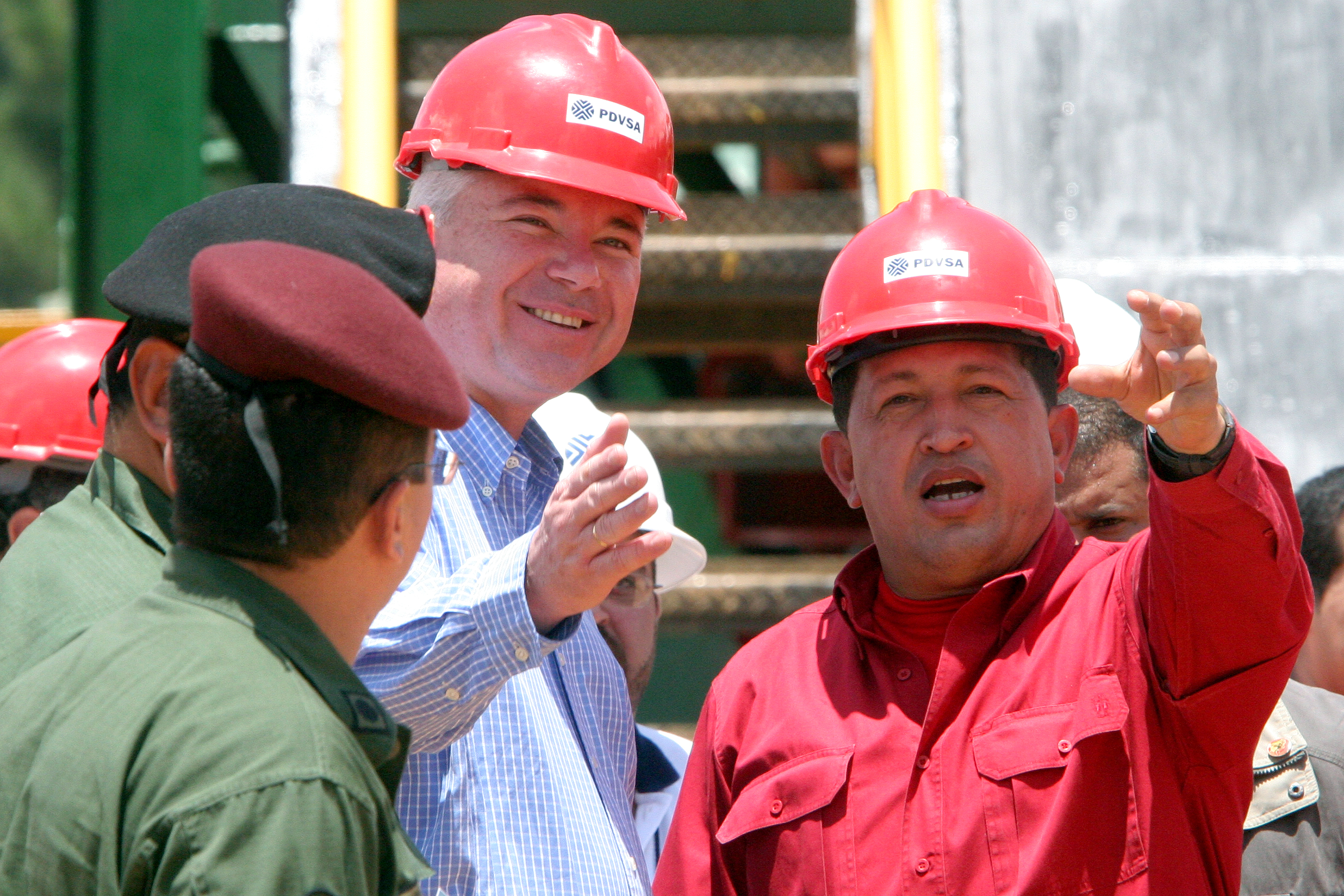
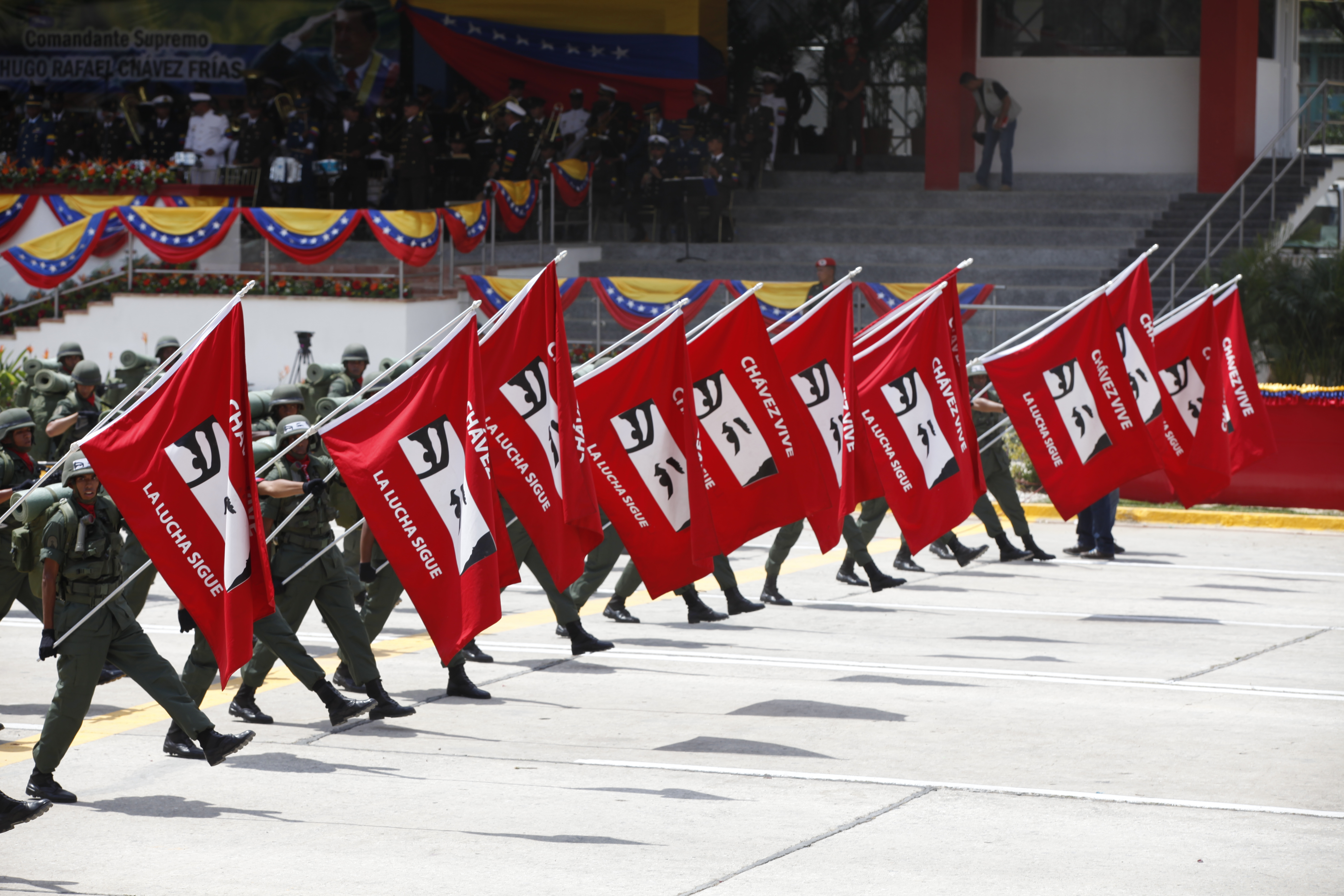
From left to right, top to bottom:
- Official portrait of president Hugo Chavez
- Official portrait of president Nicolas Maduro
- President Chavez at a rally in 2012
- President Maduro in 2016
- President Chavez with Rafael Ramírez Carreño, president of Petroleos de Venezuela (PDVSA)
- The Foreign Minister of Ecuador, Ricardo Patiño, participating in the events commemorating the death of Commander Hugo Chávez

Chavismo (Spanish pronunciation: [tʃaˈβizmo]), also known in English as Chavism or Chavezism, is a left-wing populist political ideology based on the ideas, programs, and government style associated with Hugo Chávez and Nicolás Maduro. It combines elements of socialist patriotism, state nationalism, Bolivarianism, and Latin American integration. People who supported Hugo Chávez and Chavismo are known as Chavistas. The movement split into the Madurismo and anti-Madurismo factions in the 2010s.

== Policies ==
Several political parties in Venezuela support Chavismo. The main party, founded by Chávez, is the United Socialist Party of Venezuela (Spanish: Partido Socialista Unido de Venezuela), usually referred to by the four letters PSUV). Other parties and movements supporting Chavismo include Fatherland for All (Spanish: Patria Para Todos or PPT) and Tupamaros.

Broadly, Chavismo policies include nationalization, social welfare programs and opposition to neoliberalism (particularly the policies of the International Monetary Fund and the World Bank). According to Chávez, Venezuelan socialism accepts private property, but seeks to promote social ownership as well. Ideologically, Chavismo stands in explicit opposition to right-wing politics and frequently labels its political opponents (including centre-left figures) as "fascists" or representatives of right-wing oligarchy.

== Support ==
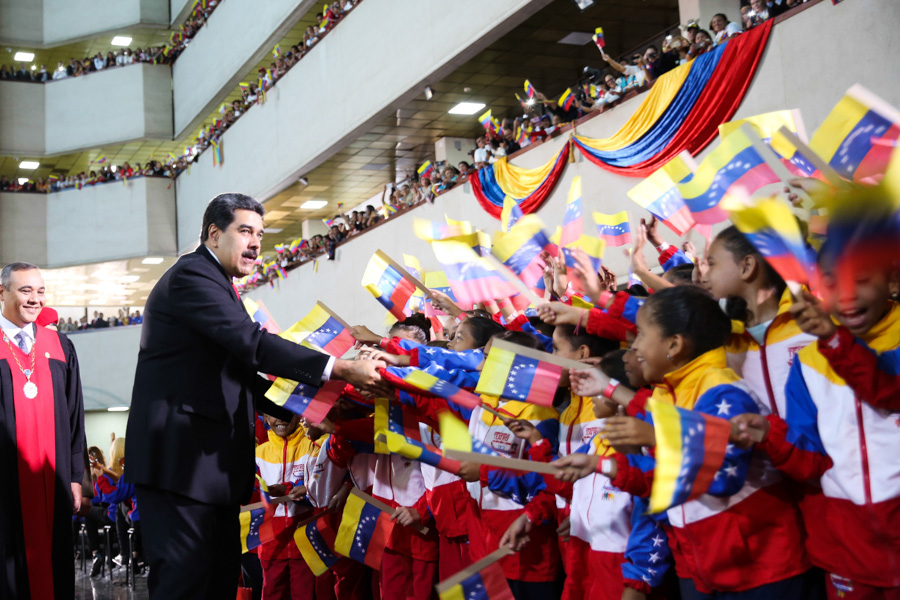
Nicolás Maduro with supporters at Maduro's second inauguration on 10 January 2019

According to political scientist John Magdaleno, the proportion of Venezuelans who define themselves as Chavistas declined from 44% to around 22% between October 2012 and December 2014, after the death of Hugo Chávez and the deterioration of the economy during Nicolás Maduro's tenure. In February 2014, a poll conducted by International Consulting Services, an organization created by Juan Vicente Scorza, a sociologist and anthropologist for the National Experimental University of the Armed Forces, found that 62% of Venezuelans consider themselves supporters or followers of the ideals of Chávez.

By 2016, many Chavistas became disenchanted with the Bolivarian government under Maduro and sought to emigrate from Venezuela to a more stable country.

== Criticism ==
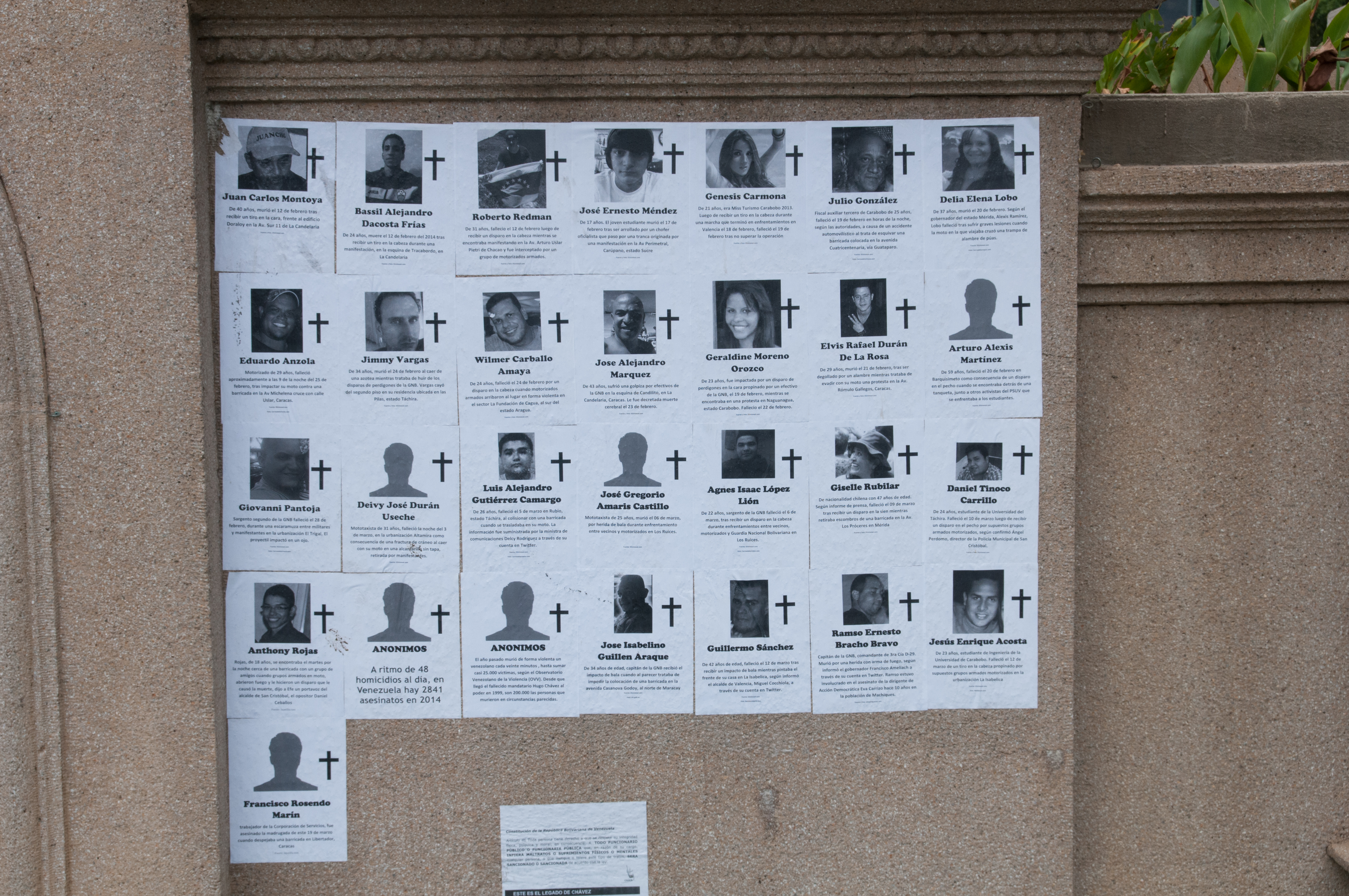
Banner at demonstrations and protests against Chavismo and the Nicolás Maduro government.

Chavismo has been frequently described as being state capitalist by critics. In a 2017 interview, after being asked if he would take Venezuela's failing economy as an admission that socialism "wrecked people's lives", philosopher Noam Chomsky said: "I never described Chavez's state capitalist government as 'socialist' or even hinted at such an absurdity. It was quite remote from socialism. Private capitalism remained ... Capitalists were free to undermine the economy in all sorts of ways, like massive export of capital." Critics also frequently point towards Venezuela's large private sector. In 2009, roughly 70% of Venezuela's gross domestic product was created by the private sector.

Venezuela's dependence on oil revenues has been cited as a major factor in the country's economic instability. Reliance on oil revenues left Venezuela especially vulnerable to the volatility of global oil markets. While high oil prices in the early 2000s allowed for substantial social spending, the state-run oil company Petróleos de Venezuela, S.A. (PDVSA) became increasingly politicized, with appointments and agendas often based on loyalty rather than expertise. By 2013, inefficiency and mismanagement by the government had contributed to declining production oil levels. The dependence on oil revenue, coupled with insufficient investment in other sectors, prevented the creation of a stable economy. In 2022 under Maduro, oil made up about 25% of Venezuela's GDP compared to in 2002 under Chávez the GDP dropped 24% due to an oil strike. Therefore, when oil prices fell in the 2010s, the resulting economic crisis led to widespread shortages of essential goods and an inability to maintain basic services.

Critics further argue that the government's "winner-takes-all" approach to political power enabled systemic cronyism and repression, stifling opposition through media censorship, judicial control, and the persecution of dissenters. Chávez established himself as a charismatic and populist leader, gaining a devoted following and reshaping the country's political landscape. He justified many of his policies as part of a "Bolivarian Revolution" aimed at empowering the Venezuelan people, especially the poor, who make up the grand majority of the population. However, critics contend that Chávez concentrated power within his administration, undermining democratic institutions. In 1999, shortly after being elected, Chávez pushed for a new constitution that expanded presidential powers through judiciary and governmental control, lengthened the presidential term indefinitely, and abolished the senate. The Supreme Court came under heavy influence from Chávez, and the judicial system effectively became a tool for repressing opposition and dissent. By 2009, the judiciary was described as effectively subservient to Chávez, with judges who opposed the administration being dismissed, imprisoned, or harassed. Media outlets that criticized the government or made efforts to cover both Maduro's party and the opposition were also targeted, with numerous independent outlets being closed or censored. A 2024 Committee to Protect Journalists report described Venezuela as a "news desert," stating how the regime has closed 200 radio stations over the past two years.

This concentration of power and suppression of dissent intensified under Chávez's handpicked successor, Nicolás Maduro, who has been described as taking Chavismo in an increasingly authoritarian direction. Upon Chávez's death in 2013, Maduro took office as a self-proclaimed "son of Chávez" and continued the populist rhetoric of the Bolivarian Revolution. However, Maduro's government faced significant opposition from right political parties, with public dissatisfaction fueled by widespread economic hardship. In response, Maduro cracked down on opposition groups, media, and protests, creating a political environment described as one-party rule. During the mass protests in 2014 and again in 2017, government forces responded with significant violence, resulting in hundreds of deaths and thousands of arrests. Critics argue that Maduro's administration has systematically repressed political opposition, using intimidation, imprisonment, and torture against opponents.

In addition to political repression, critics argue that Chavismo's economic policies and the resulting crises have precipitated one of the worst humanitarian emergencies in Latin American history. As of recent years, severe food and medicine shortages, hyperinflation, and skyrocketing poverty have become the reality for millions of Venezuelans. A mass migration crisis has seen over six million people leave the country, just over a fourth of the total population, seeking stability and opportunity elsewhere such as Colombia or the United States. It has been argued that this crisis is rooted in the economic mismanagement and corruption of both Chávez and Maduro's administrations, which neglected to develop industries outside of oil and failed to create a resilient economy. While Chavismo's rhetoric emphasized social equality, the movement prioritized short-term welfare programs over sustainable economic development, leaving the population vulnerable to economic downturns. Additionally, corruption within the government and PDVSA, along with a lack of transparency, have exacerbated the suffering of the public, who now bear the brunt of these missteps.

Chavez has been criticized for creating an economic and political system that ultimately failed to achieve its stated goals of social equality and democratic empowerment. Instead, critics argue that Chavez's economic model was more state capitalist than socialist, heavily reliant on oil revenues and marked by corruption and mismanagement. Politically, Chavismo is accused of eroding democratic institutions and fostering a culture of authoritarianism, with the judiciary, media, and military aligned with the ruling party. The repression of opposition and establishment of civilian militias to monitor and suppress dissent have also fueled criticism of Chavismo as an authoritarian regime.

=== Normalization ===
According to El Pitazo "normalization of Chavismo" is a political and sociological concept used by analysts, journalists, and the Venezuelan opposition to describe the processes and actors that contribute to the acceptance and legitimization of the Bolivarian Revolution, led by the United Socialist Party of Venezuela (PSUV) and Nicolás Maduro, despite criticisms regarding its authoritarian nature and democratic backsliding in the country. Analysts say this involves the progressive adaptation of various internal and external sectors to the stabilization of Chavista political control. This process, they argue, occurs through the reduction of political confrontation, transforming what much of the international community has classified as a political and humanitarian crisis into a situation described by some as "authoritarian peace".

According to Infobae, the use of the term intensified beginning in 2019, following the failure of the "maximum pressure" and international isolation strategy promoted and led by Juan Guaidó and his international allies (primarily the United States). Faced with the impossibility of an immediate democratic breakthrough or regime change, parts of the Venezuelan opposition and global actors began to incline toward negotiation and coexistence. This led, among other things, to the return of the Unitary Platform to the electoral arena in the 2021 regional elections, and to the end of the "interim government" in late 2022 by the so-called "G4", composed at the time of Primero Justicia, Acción Democrática, Un Nuevo Tiempo, and Voluntad Popular, which were the majority opposition parties holding the absolute majority in the National Assembly elected in 2015.

The concept regained relevance after the 2024 presidential election, a process widely questioned by observers and parts of the opposition due to alleged irregularities and the disqualification of the unitary candidate, María Corina Machado. The National Electoral Council did not publish detailed voting results, while the opposition published over 80% of voting records verified by independent organizations, which declared the victory of Edmundo González Urrutia.

While the majority opposition bloc, represented by Machado and González, has promoted actions to disregard the official result by seeking international support and the designation of the Cartel of the Suns as an international terrorist organization, with the ultimate goal of achieving a peaceful transition to democracy, the sectors referred to as "normalizers" have advocated for the tacit acceptance of the official 2024 result (which declared Nicolás Maduro as the winner) and the continuation of electoral participation under CNE-imposed conditions. This faction argues that the institutional path must be followed and that it is necessary to "preserve spaces" rather than promote abstention, which they claim has failed in past attempts. Examples include the participation of Un Nuevo Tiempo and Unión y Cambio (a party created by former members of Primero Justicia) in the parliamentary and regional elections of 2025. This stance is criticized by the Unitary Platform, whose members believe that these actions consolidate the Chavista regime's power while using these actors as a "façade of political pluralism".

== Academic views on Chavismo ==
Academic research produced about Chavismo shows a considerable consensus when acknowledging its early shift to the left and its strong populist component. However, besides these two points there is significant disagreement in the literature. According to Kirk A. Hawkins, scholars are generally divided into two camps: a liberal democratic one that sees Chavismo as an instance of democratic backsliding and a radical democratic one that upholds Chavismo as the fulfillment of its aspirations for democracy. Hawkins argues that the most important division between these two groups is neither methodological nor theoretical, but ideological. It is a division over basic normative views of democracy: liberalism versus radicalism.

=== Liberal democracy approach ===
Scholars in this camp adhered to a classical liberal ideology that valued procedural democracy (competitive elections, widespread participation defined primarily in terms of voting and civil liberties) as the political means best suited to achieving human welfare. Many of these scholars had a liberal vision of economics, although some were moderate social democrats who were critical of neoliberalism. Together, they saw Chavismo in a mostly negative light as a case of democratic backsliding or even competitive authoritarianism or electoral authoritarian regime. The most relevant aspects of the liberal critique of Chavismo are the following:

1. Failure to ensure free and fair elections due to fraud or frequent changes of electoral rules. The government also violates principles of electoral freedom, especially during and after the 2004 presidential recall election. Many of these violations would be possible due to bias within the National Electoral Council.
2. Violation of civil liberties. A number of civil liberties saw significant reverses under the Chávez government, including the right of association and freedom of expression. Some of the most significant setbacks are in media freedom, where Chavism has used several means to constrain the operation of commercial media.
3. Infringement of separation of powers. Liberal scholars argue that Chavismo eliminates the separation of powers between the branches of government by manipulating to produce a super majority to the supreme court. Besides, by 2006, the government had fired hundreds of judges in lower courts as well and threatened to remove and prosecute any judge who dared to rule against the government.
4. Political discrimination and exclusion of opposition parties. Under Chavista governments, state resources are used to favor the incumbent, the opposition parties lack access to media, and legal institutions are captured by the incumbent. Besides, many sources cited by liberal scholars suggest that the government's participatory initiatives are used as campaign infrastructure.
5. Undermining the rule of law. Liberal critics present three majors examples to sustain that: (i) the politicization of the judiciary and the bureaucracy violated due process and facilitated the growth of corruption; (ii) the state's willingness to intervene in and expropriate private industry, often through dubious legal means, served to weaken property rights; (iii) and levels of violent crime skyrocketed.

=== Radical democracy approach ===
Scholars in this camp generally adhered to a classical socialist ideology that mistrusted market institutions in either the state or the economy. They saw procedural democracy as insufficient to ensure political inclusion (although they still accepted the importance of liberal democratic institutions) and emphasized participatory forms of democracy and collective worker ownership in the economy. They tended toward descriptions of the movement that celebrated its participatory features or analyzed its potential weaknesses for accomplishing its revolutionary goals. Most of these scholars supported Chavismo and helped constitute the civilian wing of the movement. Radical scholars argue that democracy can only become effective if it is deepened—and they feel that Chavismo is doing this deepening, which requires not only the greater inclusion of poor and excluded sectors in decision making but their remaking into a new "popular" identity that facilitates their autonomy and dignity. For some of these scholars, deepening also means the adoption of a socialist economy and some argue it requires taking power through charismatic leadership, which would have enough political support to conduct structural reforms (pages 313–319).

=== Relationship with Trotskyism ===
In 2007, Hugo Chávez proclaimed support for the ideas of Marxist Leon Trotsky, saying "When I called him (former Minister of Labour, José Ramón Rivero)" Chávez explained, "he said to me: 'President I want to tell you something before someone else tells you ... I am a Trotskyist', and I said, 'well, what is the problem? I am also a Trotskyist! I follow Trotsky's line, that of permanent revolution', and then cited Marx and Lenin".

== Chavismo and the media ==
In The Weekly Standard in 2005, Thor Halvorssen Mendoza described the core of Chavismo as a "far-reaching foreign policy that aims to establish a loosely aligned federation of revolutionary republics as a resistance bloc in the Americas".

In 2006, Noam Chomsky expressed a certain degree of support for Chávez and his policies, saying that he was "quite interested" by his policies and that he regarded "many of them" as "quite constructive", noting that most importantly Chávez seemed to enjoy overwhelming support from his people after "six closely supervised elections".

According to an article in The New York Sun, Chavismo was rejected in elections around 2006 in Peru, Colombia and Mexico. El Universal reported that Brazilian President Luiz Inácio Lula da Silva kept distance from Chavismo, saying that Brazil is not Venezuela and has traditional institutions. Still, Lula supported Chávez in the Venezuelan presidential election of 2012.

The Nation noted on its editorial pages the following:

Chavismo is not an adequate description of the social movement that makes up Chávez's political base, since many organizations predate his rise to political power, and their leaders and cadre have a sophisticated understanding of their relationship with Chávez. Over the last couple of years, a number of social scientists have done field work in urban barrios, and their findings confirm that this synergy between the central government and participatory local organizations has expanded, not restricted, debate and that democracy is thriving in Venezuela.

Chavismo has ripped open the straitjacket of post–Cold War Latin American discourse, particularly the taboo against government regulation of the economy and economic redistribution. Public policy, including economic policy, is now open to discussion and, importantly, popular influence. This is in sharp contrast to Costa Rica, where a few months ago its Supreme Court, with the support of its executive branch, prohibited public universities from not just opposing but even debating the Central American Free Trade Agreement, which soon won a national referendum by a razor-thin margin.

In February 2014, about a year following Hugo Chávez's death, The Atlantic stated the following:

Hugo Chávez based his popularity on his extraordinary charisma, much discretionary money, and a key and well-tested political message: denouncing the past and promising a better future for all. The country's widespread student protests now symbolize the demise of this message. Venezuelans younger than 30 years of age (the majority of the population) have not known any government other than that of Chávez or Maduro. For them, "Chavismo" is the past. As for the promises of a better future: The results are in. The catastrophic consequences of Chávez's 21st-century socialism are impossible to mask any longer and the government has run out of excuses. Blaming the CIA, the "fascist opposition", or "dark international forces", as Maduro and his allies customarily do, has become fodder for parodies flooding YouTube. The concrete effects of 15 years of Chavismo are all too visible in empty shelves and overflowing morgues.

In 2015, when The Economist was commenting about corruption in Latin America, it said the following:

The viceroys of the colonial era set the pattern. They centralised power and bought the loyalty of local interest groups. [...] Caudillos, dictators and elected presidents continued the tradition of personalising power. Venezuela's Chavismo and the Kirchnerismo of Ms Fernández are among today's manifestations.

== Factions ==
The Chavismo movement has experienced multiple internal factions, particularly under Maduro's presidency.

=== Madurismo ===
The hardline faction led by former President Nicolás Maduro was a dominant faction of the movement from late 2012, and has governed Venezuela since Chávez's death in 2013 until the capture of Maduro in January 2026. The group was the most involved in the erosion of democracy in Venezuela, authoritarian rule, and influence of intelligence groups (like SEBIN) repressing the opposition. This faction also presented a strong anti-American anti anti-imperialist rhetoric, using external pressure to justify the restriction of civil liberties. In practice, unlike the strict state-controlled model of Hugo Chávez, Madurismo permits de facto dollarization, eases price and currency controls, and actively courts private capital to bypass international sanctions. Although Maduro's government enacted a law prohibiting neoliberal thought, the Communist Party of Venezuela and the newspaper La Izquierda Diario have asserted that Maduro holds a neoliberal political ideology.Other members of this faction included generals Diosdado Cabello and Vladimir Padrino López.

=== Delcismo ===
The pragmatic faction led by acting President Delcy Rodríguez and President of the National Assembly of Venezuela Jorge Rodríguez. Initially members of the Maduro administration, they were involved into a more submissive behavior towards the United States following the 2026 intervention in Venezuela. This faction was responsible for reprivatization of assets seized during the Chávez and Maduro governments, passing an amnesty law leading to a mass prisoner release, and engaging in transition talks with the opposition in August 2026.

== See also ==
- Bolivarianism
- Cartel of the Suns
- Colectivo (Venezuela)
- Great Patriotic Pole
- Hugo Chávez's cult of personality
- List of political parties in Venezuela
- Socialism of the 21st century
- Solidarity economy
- Welfare capitalism

=== Similar ideologies ===
- Madurismo
- Allendism
- Dutertismo
- Kirchnerism
- Lulism
- Marhaenism
- Nasserism
- Peronism
- Sankarism

== Bibliography ==
- Andrews-Lee, Caitlin. The Emergence and Revival of Charismatic Movements: Argentine Peronism And Venezuelan Chavismo (Cambridge University Press, 2021)
- Hawkins, Kirk A. Venezuela's Chavismo and Populism in Comparative Perspective' (Cambridge UP, 2010)
- Ramirez, C.V. (2005). "Venezuela's Bolivarian Revolution: Who Are the Chavistas?". Latin American Perspectives. 32 (3): 79–97. doi:10.1177/0094582x05275532. S2CID 145020614.
- Porras, Simon Rodriguez, and Miguel Sorans, eds. Why did Chavismo fail? A balance sheet from the left opposition (Centro de Estudios Humanos y Sociales CEHuS, 2018)
- Smilde, David , et al. eds. The Paradox of Violence in Venezuela: Revolution, Crime, and Policing During Chavismo (University of Pittsburgh Press, 2023)
