= Economic war =

Economic war may refer to

- Economic warfare economic policies and measures of which the primary effect is to weaken the economy of the enemy.
- War economy, the economy of a country during wartime.
- The Anglo-Irish Trade War of 1932 to 1938
- A set of policies in Uganda under Idi Amin, including the expropriation of properties owned by Asians and Europeans.
- The 2019–2020 Japan–South Korea trade dispute, also known as "Economic war" by many media in South Korea and Japan.
