= Hugo Chávez's cult of personality =

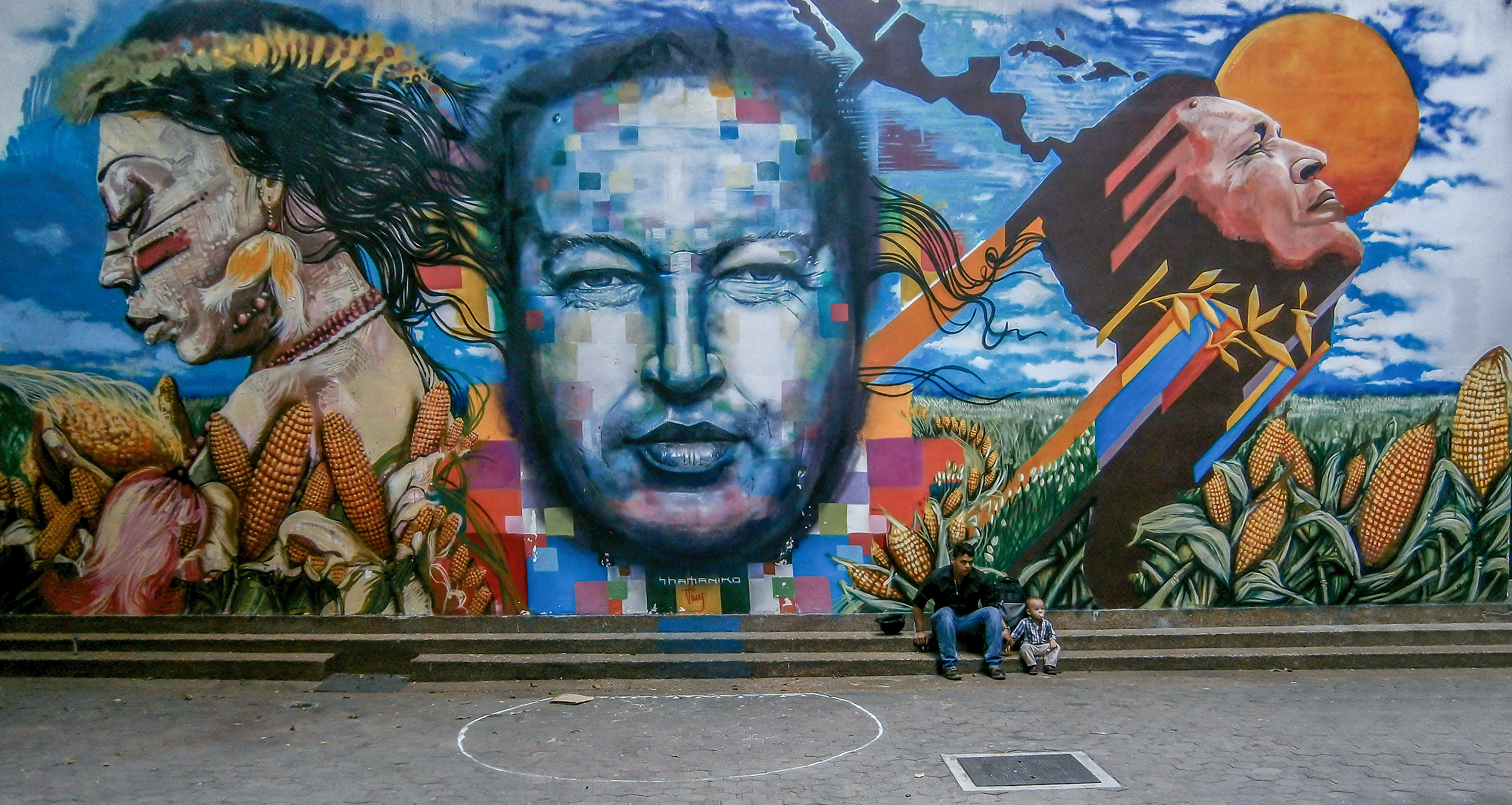
Mural of Hugo Chávez and his ascension into heaven

In Venezuela, a cult of personality has been created around the late President Hugo Chávez, where his supporters venerate him. Chávez largely received his support through his charisma and by spending Venezuela's oil funds on the poor.

Since his death, followers known as "Chavistas" refer to his death as a "transition to immortality", commonly calling Chávez the "eternal commander". Among his followers, Chávez has been compared to holy figures, especially by his successor Nicolás Maduro.

== Background ==
Personalist governments had existed in Venezuela in the past[.] [...] But no one else had as much money as this government. Chávez's capacity to penetrate mass media has also been without precedent.

— Tomas Straka, historian

According to Tomas Straka of Andres Bello University, Chávez's cult of personality began following the 1992 Venezuelan coup d'état attempts which Chávez led, with Straka explaining that some Venezuelans "saw no solution to their most fundamental problems and they saw in Chávez a savior, or an avenger of those groups that had no hope". Since the beginning of Chávez's tenure in 1999, the Venezuelan government manipulated the Venezuelan public with social programs depicting him as a great leader for the people. The struggles that Chávez endured throughout his presidency, such as the 2002 Venezuelan coup d'état attempt, also drew compassion from his followers which boosted his support.

By the time of Chávez's death, speculation about potential Chavista reactions to his death were compared to the sorrow felt by those in North Korea who mourned the death of Kim Jong Il, with one scholar of Latin America from the University of California Santa Barbara, Juan Pablo Lupi, stating that the creation of Chávez's cult of personality was "very well-staged, all this process of myth-making and appealing to the feelings and religious sentiment of the people. This is something that is quasi-religious". Lupi's explanation of Chávez's cult of personality was similar to those of Juan Carlos Bertorelli, a marketing company creative director in Caracas and Larry Birns, the director of the Council on Hemispheric Affairs. Carlos Bertorelli stated that the Bolivarian government created a cult of personality surrounding Chávez in order to "maintain a presence that legitimizes them" while Birns stated that "For many in the movement, Chavez, or the movement of the Chavistas towards a religious stance, is less a matter of faith than it is a matter of strategy".

== Religious image ==
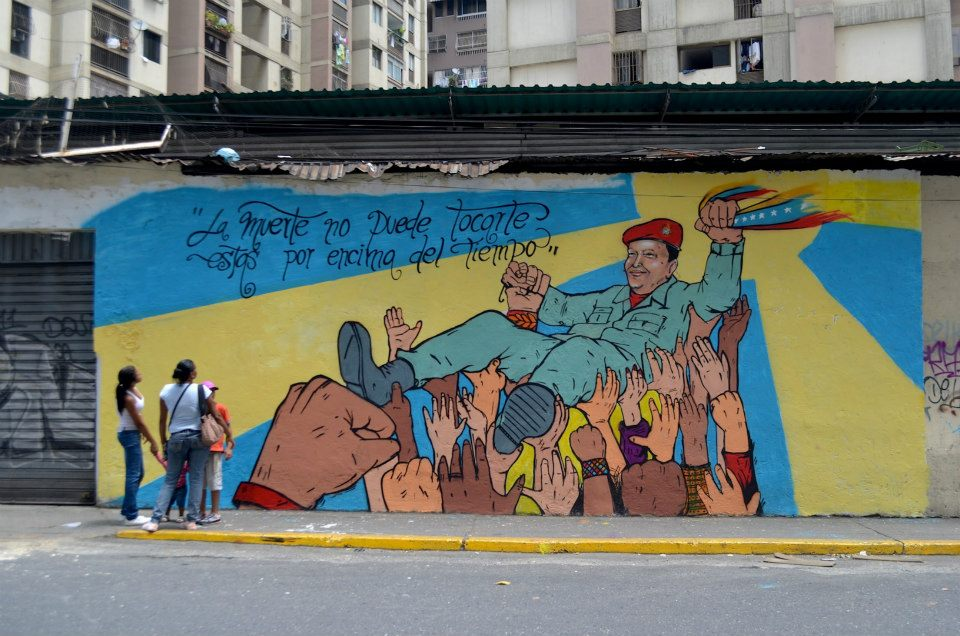
A mural of Chávez saying "Death can not touch you, you are above time"

According to the Associated Press, "Chavez's legacy has taken on a religious glow in Venezuela" and that "[r]osaries adorned with Chavez's face, shrines and images depicting him with a Christian cross have become commonplace". In 2014, those involved in education and the government's opposition accused Venezuela's new educational curriculum of making Chávez appear "messianic", as the "liberator of Venezuela", and like "the new God". While saying the opposition celebrated the drought Venezuela was experiencing in early 2014, President Maduro said that the rainy season came because of "Chavez and God" saying that Chavez blew the clouds with God.

=== "Our Chávez" prayer controversy ===
At a Workshop on Socialist System Design Training gathering held by the PSUV on 1 September 2014, participants recited a modified version of the Lord's Prayer.

The modified version, recited by Maria Uribe, a delegate of the Committee on Communication and Propaganda of PSUV-Táchira, read:

Our Chavez, who art in heaven, on earth, in the sea and in us the representatives, hallowed be thy name, Thy legacy come, So we can bring it to towns here and there, Give us this day your light so it guides us every day, Lead us not into the tempation of capitalism, but deliver us from the evil of the oligarchy, and the crime of smuggling, Because the mother land is ours, and so is peace and life. Forever and ever amen. Long live Chavez!

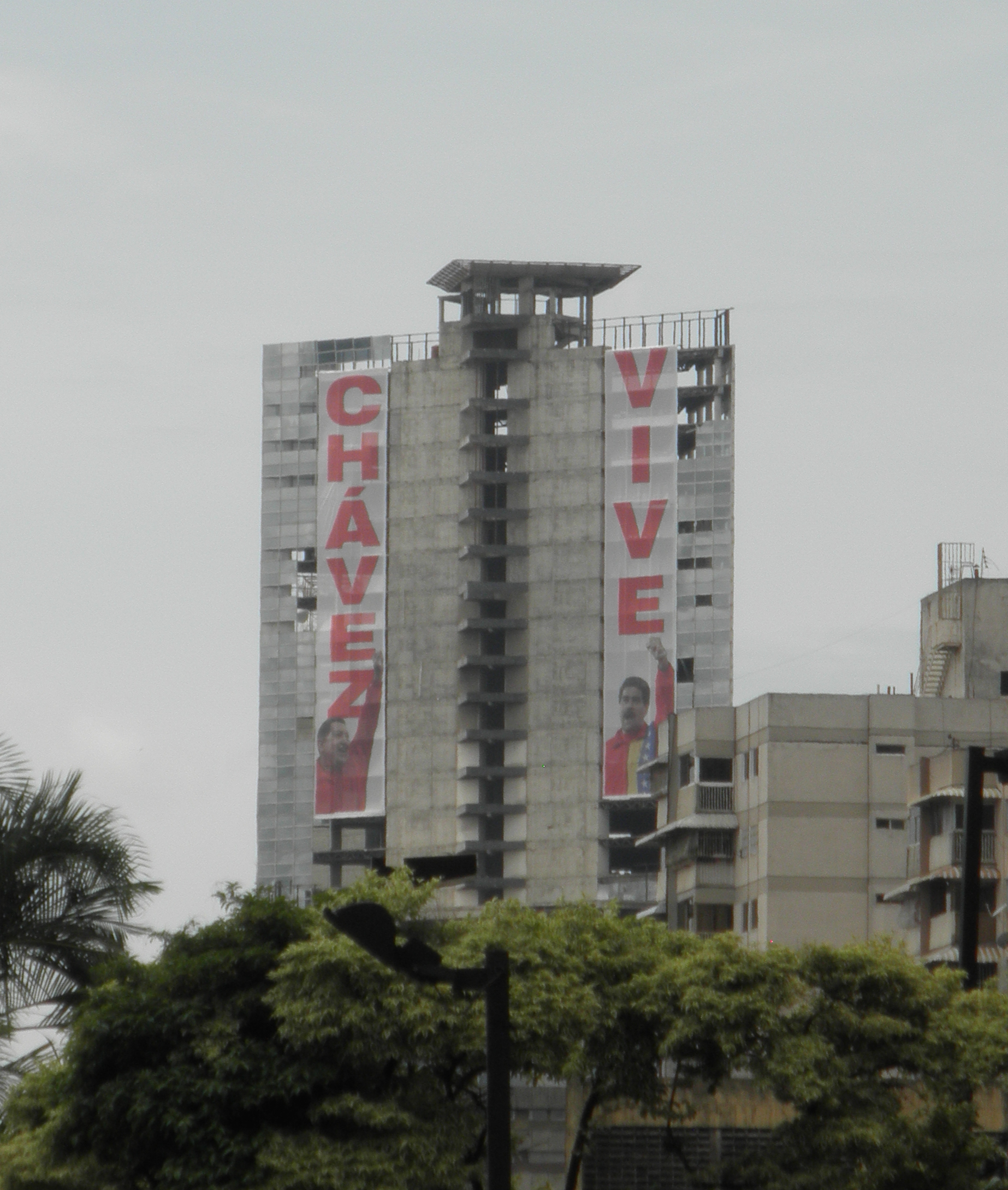
Centro Financiero Confinanzas, the third tallest building in Venezuela and seventh tallest in South America, draped with banners saying "Chávez Lives"

CNN reported that Christians in Venezuela were offended, saying that "the words of a prayer found in the books of Matthew and Luke in the Bible should not be changed for political propaganda or any other purposes". Another domestic reaction came from the Venezuelan newspaper La Verdad, who compared the act to something "from the mind of Joseph Goebbels, the Nazi propaganda father". The Catholic Church of Venezuela criticized the modified version in a statement signed by head figures of the organization, saying that The Lord's Prayer is "untouchable", that whoever recited the modified version would be committing the sin of idolatry. Monsignor Baltazar Porras, bishop of Mérida, said that this type of action "is nothing new" in the years following the Bolivarian Revolution and that the Venezuelan government wanted to "screw in the principles and values which the revolution wants to impose, a kind of secular religion".

Maria Uribe, the Committee on Communication and Propaganda of PSUV-Táchira member who recited the "prayer" responded to the criticism saying that the "prayer of the delegates" was to reflect on "what it meant to be like Chávez" who she called "an example of solidarity, love, commitment, humanity and honesty". President Maduro rejected the Catholic Church's response saying that they were trying to implement a "new Inquisition". President of the National Assembly, Diosdado Cabello, also criticized the Catholic Church saying they should worry about more important matters.

Head of the Department of Latin America for Deutsche Welle, Uta Thofern, responded to the action saying that the "Bolivarian movement seems to stop being a political movement for the sake of becoming a cult fanaticism" and saying that since she was a German, she feared that the Bolivarian leaders "consciously used religious symbols and instruments, abusing the spiritual needs of people" in ways that were seen under "German dictatorships". Ennio Cardozo, a political scientist at the Central University of Venezuela, states that acts like "Our Chávez" is the Venezuelan government's "effort to sustain its legitimacy".

== Analysis ==
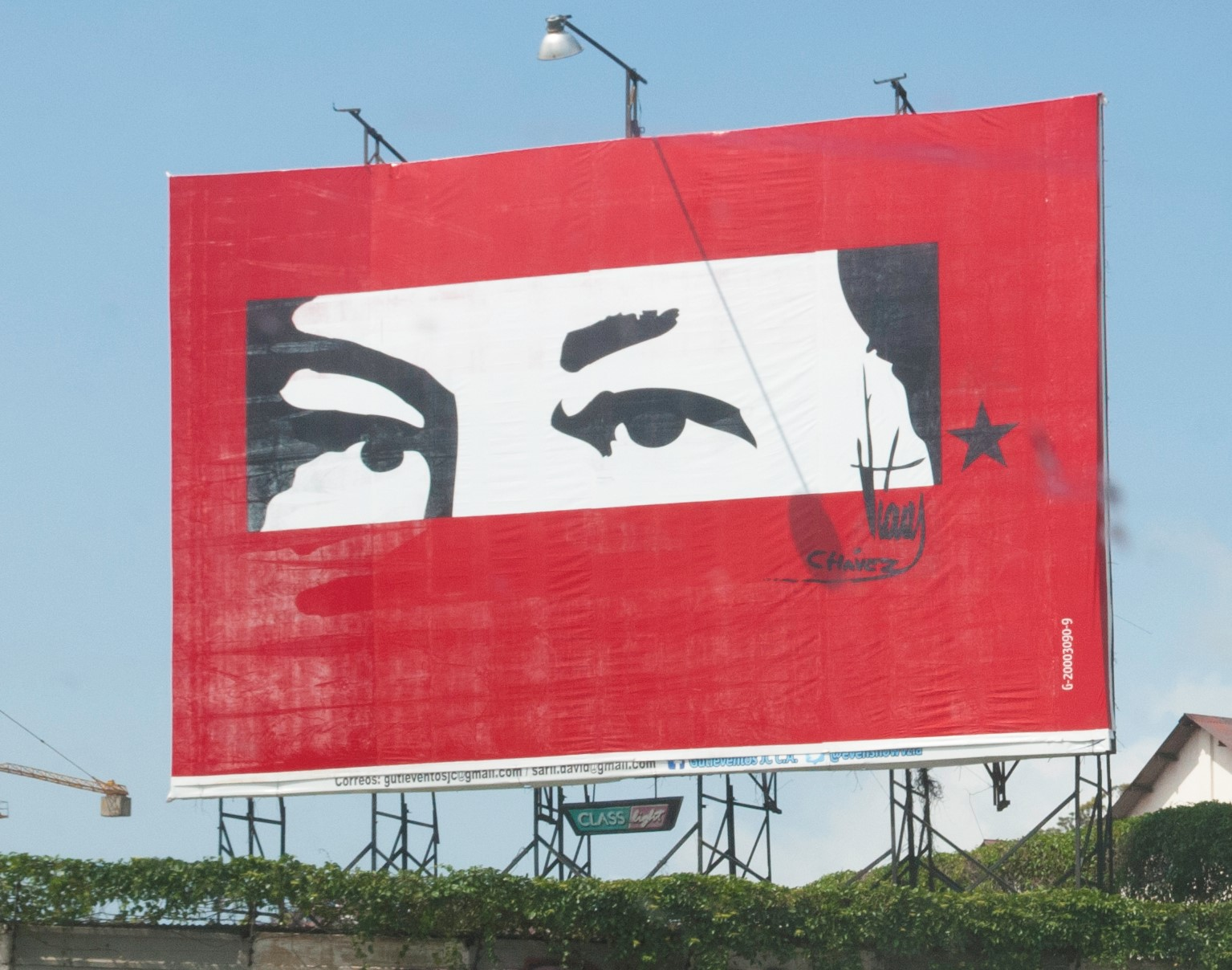
A billboard of Chávez eyes and signature in Guarenas, Miranda

Latin American literary scholar at UCSB, Juan Lupi, sees parallels between the veneration of Chavez to that of Evita Perón in Argentina. In a report about Chavez's funeral Spiegel Online wrote, "His last procession is also a TV marathon, presented in the tone of a sermon, during which Chávez, the freedom fighter Simón Bolívar and Jesus Christ merge into one person."

According to a 2014 report titled Faces and Traces of a Leader. Hugo Chavez: Memory of a People by the Venezuelan government's National Center for History, one work of propaganda, the Chávez eyes, are supposed to represent a "watchful and protective gaze" and present a feeling of transparency or trust related to the phrase "Look into my eyes when I'm talking". It was also noted that since Chávez was not physically present in Venezuela anymore, the Chávez eyes to Bolivarian government supporters represented an "omnipresent" Chávez, reminding voters of their "ideological commitment". Some who experienced the work say that it instills a presence of Chávez, a sense that he is "always watching you" that has been compared to the Orwellian figure, Big Brother.

== See also ==
- Bolivarian propaganda
- List of cults of personality
