= Chávez eyes =

Political symbol in Venezuela

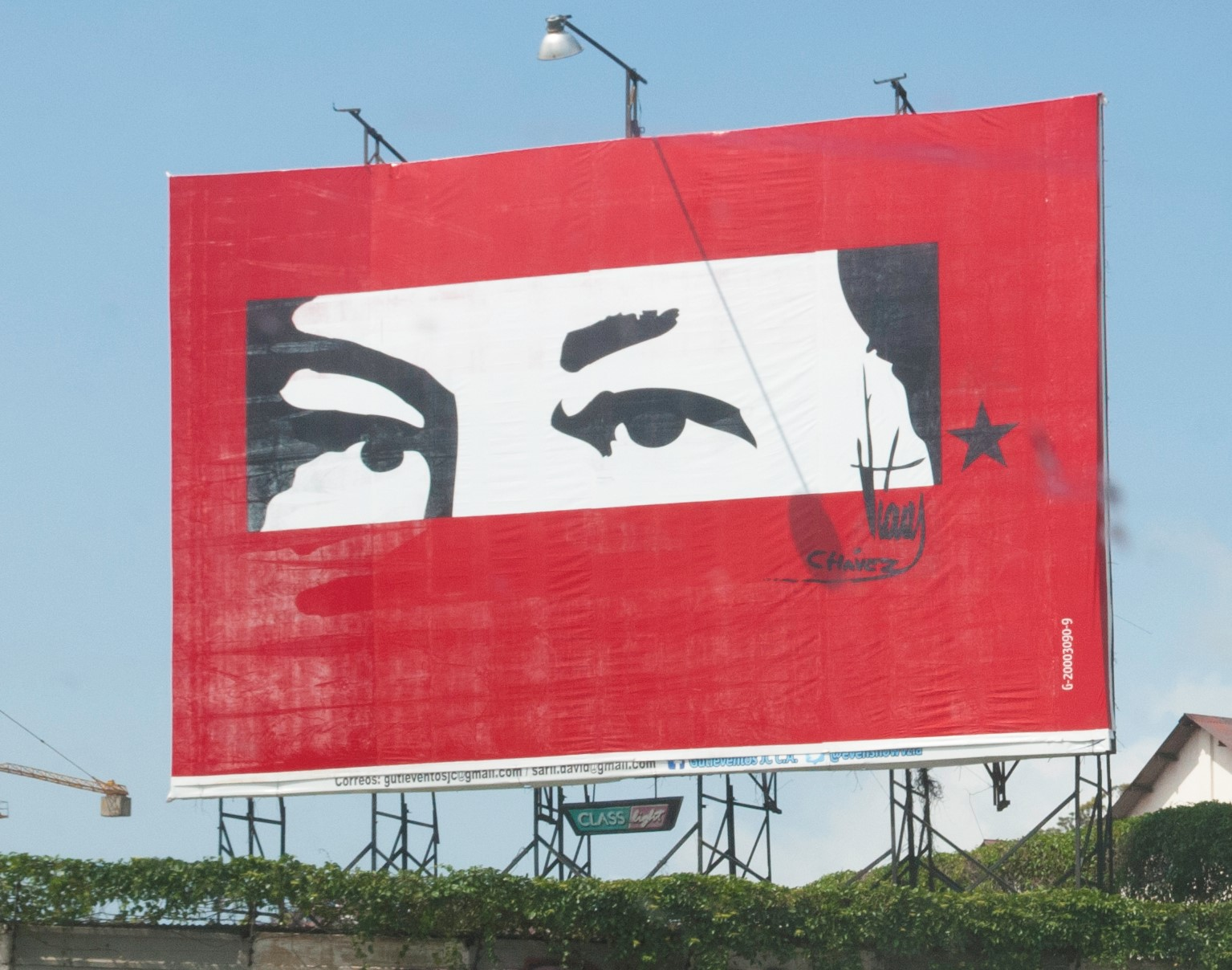
A billboard of Hugo Chávez's eyes and signature in Guarenas, Venezuela.

"Chávez eyes" (Spanish: ojos de Chávez) is a design of stylized eyes of former president of Venezuela Hugo Chávez that has become pervasive throughout Venezuela among the supporters of Chávez, the Venezuelan government and PSUV. The design has appeared on "billboards, T-shirts and buildings around the nation" and has been used as propaganda in support of the Bolivarian government. Many of the buildings where the Chavez eyes appear, are government-owned.

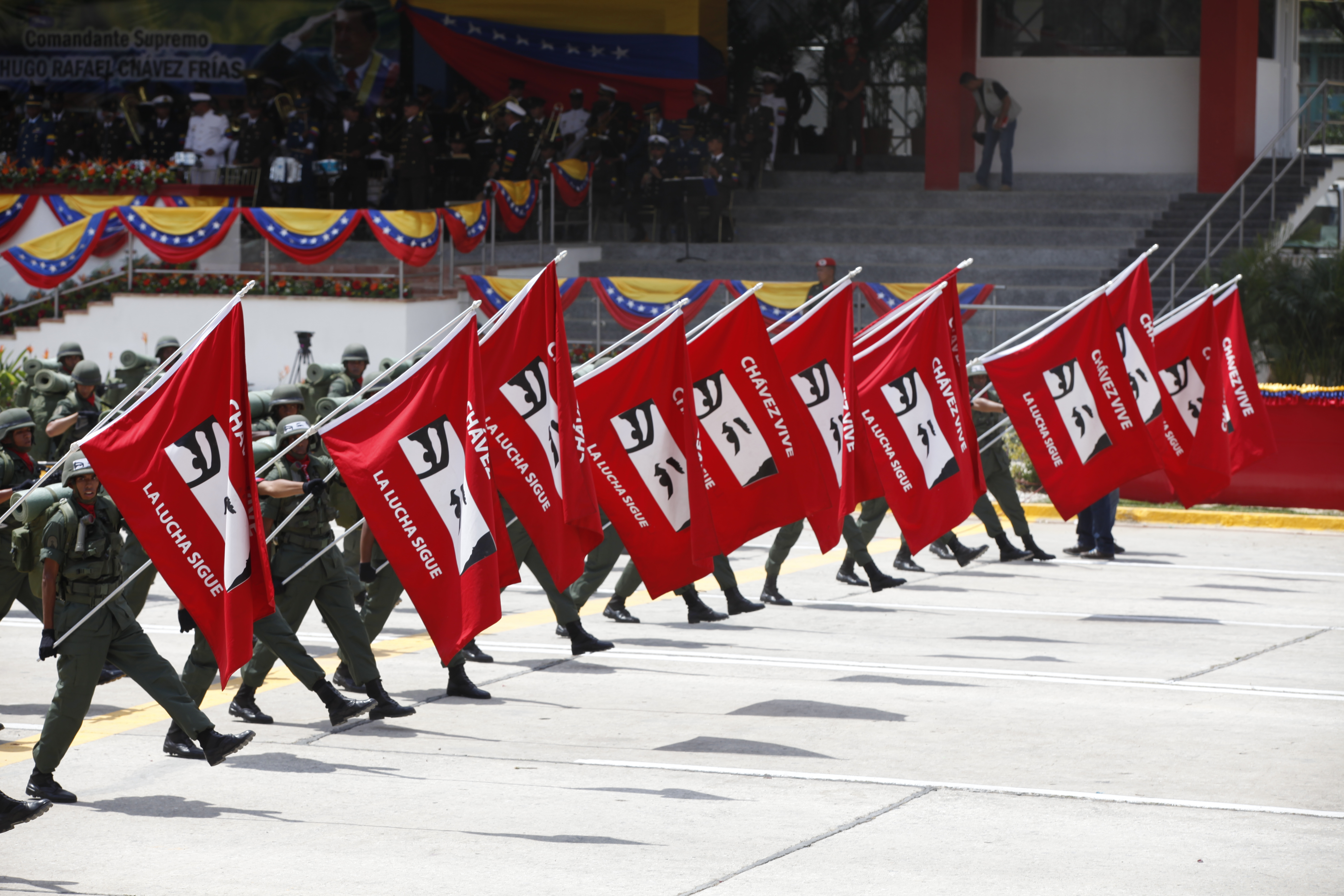
Members of the Venezuelan armed forces carrying "Chávez eyes" flags saying, "Chavez lives, the struggle continues".

"Chávez eyes" originated during Hugo Chávez's final presidential campaign in 2012, with the idea originating from José Miguel España, a member of Chávez's campaign. During an election gathering, thousands of Chávez supporters wore red shirts printed with his eyes in black.

The design was then widely used by Chávez supporters. Following Chávez's death, Venezuelan president Nicolás Maduro adopted the emblem after coming to power, placing the eyes on "billboards, walls, and even the facades of public buildings". By 2015, Reuters described the "Chávez eyes" as "[t]he most ubiquitous image in Venezuela of recent years".

== Uses ==
=== Elections ===
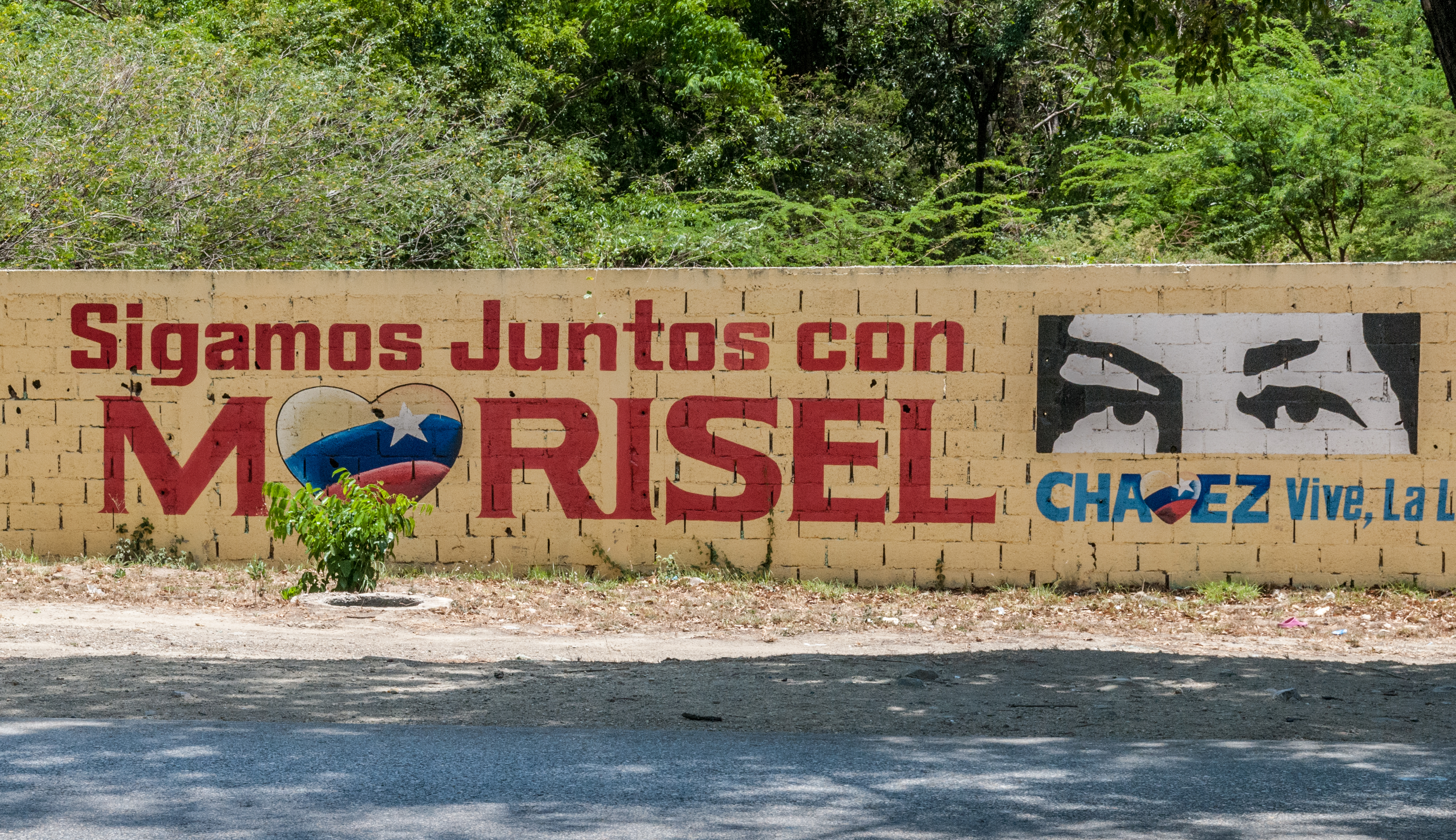
Mural supporting the Mayor of San Juan

During the 2013 Venezuelan presidential elections, Maduro used the "Chávez eyes" design for his campaign. Chávez's image was used more than Maduro's own image, with "Chávez eyes" seen on buildings, T-shirts and posters.

=== State-owned facilities ===
Between 2011 and 2017 the Venezuelan government built 1.3 million new homes as part of its Great Mission Housing Venezuela project. The eyes design is visible from many of these new housing complexes.

Following the 2015 Venezuelan parliamentary election, which installed an opposition majority in the National Assembly, the parliamentary body decided to have the Chávez eyes removed from the Federal Legislative Palace. Following the National Assembly's move, the Venezuelan government asked for muralists "to paint against censorship", with murals beginning to flood throughout Caracas.

=== Use by popular figures ===
At a Chávez tribute in November 2014, Pablo Iglesias Turrión, leader of the Spanish political party Podemos, was seen wearing a red shirt with the "eyes of Chávez" printed on it.

== Analysis ==
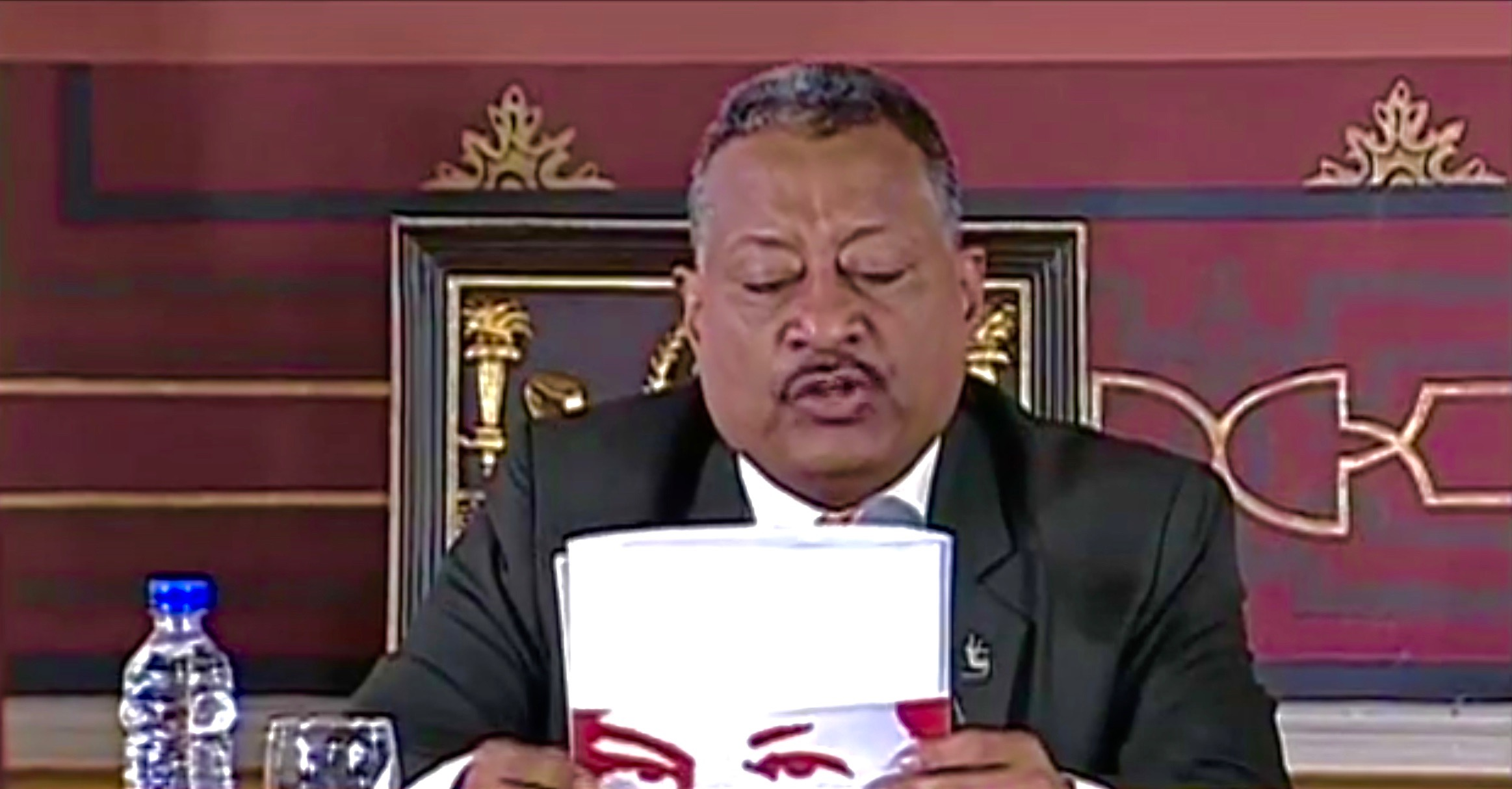
Fidel Vasquez reading from a folder bearing "Chávez eyes" during a 2017 Constituent Assembly of Venezuela session.

According to a 2014 report titled Faces and Traces of a Leader. Hugo Chavez: Memory of a People by the Venezuelan government's National Center for History, the Chávez eyes represent a "watchful and protective gaze" and present a feeling of transparency or trust related to the phrase "Look into my eyes when I'm talking". It was also said that since Chávez was not physically present in Venezuela anymore, the Chávez eyes to Bolivarian government supporters represented an "omnipresent" Chávez, reminding voters of their "ideological commitment".

Some who experienced the work say that it instils a presence of Chávez, a sense that he is "always watching you" that has been compared to the Orwellian figure, Big Brother.

== Removal from National Assembly in 2016 ==
After the 2015 Venezuelan parliamentary election, in 2016 when the Anti-Chavista National Assembly was installed in the Jose Maria Vargas building, the eyes were removed from the building, along with other symbols of chavismo, and were replaced by the seal of the National Assembly.

== See also ==
- Big Brother
- Bolivarian propaganda
- Cult of personality
