= La Izquierda Diario =

Online newspaper from Argentina

- Website type: Online newspaper
- Available in: Spanish; Portuguese; German; French; English; Catalan; Italian
- Founder: Socialist Workers' Party
- Editor: Fernando Rosso
- Website: www.laizquierdadiario.com
- Current status: Active

La Izquierda Diario is an online newspaper network that publishes news and opinion pieces. The newspaper was created by Socialist Workers' Party, a Trotskyist political party in Argentina. La Izquierda Diario has been credited for gaining a non-Trotskyist reader base among the left.

By 2014 the Socialist Workers' Party declared to have an international network of Trotskyist rapporteurs in 15 countries. The network declares to publish 15 local editions written in one of seven languages; Spanish, French, English, German, Catalan, Italian and Portuguese.
