= 2016 in Venezuela =

- Centuries: 19th; 20th; 21st
- Decades: 1990s; 2000s; 2010s; 2020s
- See also: Other events of 2016; Years in Venezuela; Timeline of Venezuelan history

Events in the year 2016 in Venezuela.

== Incumbents ==
- President: Nicolás Maduro
- Vice President: Jorge Arreaza (until January 6), Aristóbulo Istúriz (starting January 6)

=== Governors ===
- Amazonas: Liborio Guarulla
- Anzoátegui: Aristóbulo Istúriz then Nelson Moreno
- Apure: Ramón Carrizales
- Aragua: Tareck El Aissami
- Barinas: Adán Chávez
- Bolívar: Francisco Rangel Gómez
- Carabobo: Francisco Ameliach then Gustavo Pulido Cardier
- Cojedes: Erika Farías then Margaud Godoy
- Delta Amacuro: Lizeta Hernández
- Falcón: Stella Lugo
- Guárico: Ramón Rodríguez Chacín
- Lara: Henri Falcón
- Mérida: Alexis Ramirez then Ramón Guevara
- Miranda: Henrique Capriles Radonski
- Monagas: Yelitza Santaella
- Nueva Esparta: Carlos Mata Figueroa
- Portuguesa: Wilmar Castro then Reinaldo Castañeda
- Sucre: Luis Acuña then Edwin Rojas
- Táchira: José Vielma Mora
- Trujillo: Henry Rangel Silva
- Vargas: Jorge García Carneiro
- Yaracuy: Julio León Heredia
- Zulia: Francisco Arias Cárdenas

== Events ==
- 13 May – a state of emergency was declared by the president

=== Sport ===
- 5-21 August – Venezuela at the 2016 Summer Olympics: 87 competitors in 20 sports

== Deaths ==
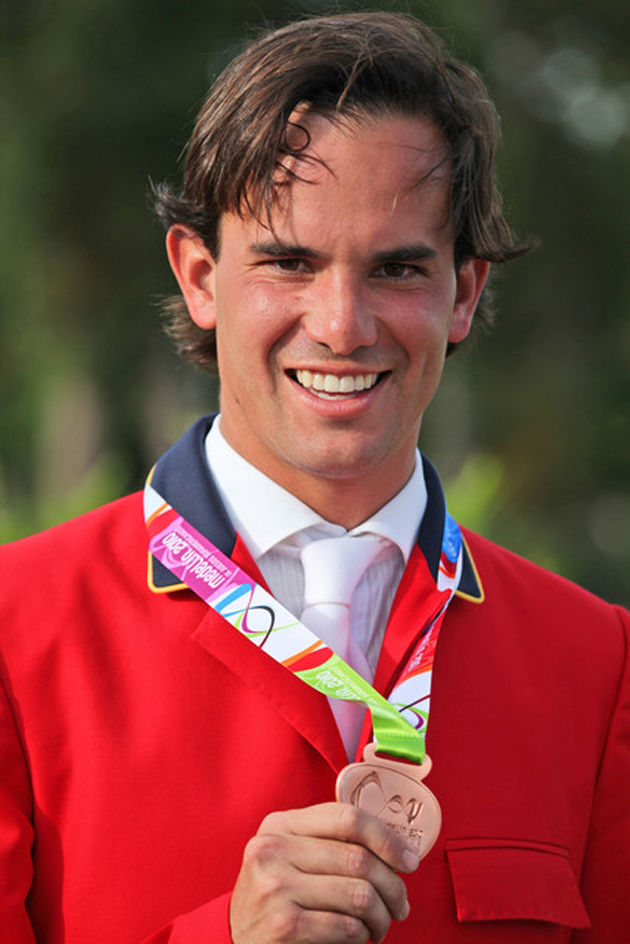
Andres Rodriguez

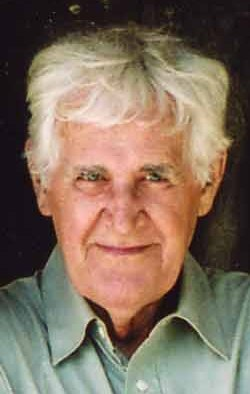
Cornelis Zitman

- 4 January – Andres Rodriguez, equestrian and businessperson (b. 1984).
- 10 January – Hernán Gamboa, musician (b. 1946).
- 10 January – Cornelis Zitman, sculptor (b. 1926).
- 18 January – Pablo Manavello, composer, guitarist, singer and songwriter (b. 1950)
- 24 January – Teófilo Rodríguez, criminal (b. 1971).
- 14 February – Peter Bottome, businessperson (b. 1937)
- 14 February – Anselmo López, bandola player (b. 1934)
- 23 February – Luis Alberto Machado, lawyer and writer (b. 1932)
- 4 March – Ramón Palomares, poet (b. 1935)
- 22 May – Alexis Navarro, politician and diplomat (b. 1946)
- 7 June – Rubén Quevedo, baseball player (b. 1979)
- 18 June – Susana Duijm, actress, television host, beauty queen, Miss World 1955 winner (b. 1936)
- 29 June – Inocente Carreño, composer (b. 1919)
- 2 July – Carlos Morocho Hernández, professional boxer, world champion (b. 1940)
- 5 July – Alirio Díaz, classical guitarist and composer (b. 1923)
- 17 July – Aníbal José Chávez Frías, politician (b. 1957)
- 1 August – Oscar Celli Gerbasi, politician (b. 1946)
- 7 August – Rodolfo Camacho, cyclist (b. 1975)
- 23 August – Mercedes Pulido, politician and diplomat (b. 1938)
- 6 September – Alfredo Peña, journalist and politician (b. 1944)
- 18 November – Kervin Piñerua, volleyball player (b. 1991)
- 24 November – Luis Miquilena, politician (b. 1919)
- 25 November – Bernardo Álvarez Herrera, diplomat (b. 1956)
