= 2021 in Venezuela =

- Centuries: 19th; 20th; 21st
- Decades: 2000s; 2010s; 2020s
- See also: Other events of 2021; Years in Venezuela; Timeline of Venezuelan history

The following lists events in the year 2021 in Venezuela.

== Incumbents ==
- President: Nicolás Maduro, Juan Guaidó (presidential crisis)
- Vice President: Delcy Rodríguez

=== Governors ===
- Amazonas: Miguel Rodríguez
- Anzoátegui: Antonio Barreto Sira then Luis José Marcano Salazar
- Apure: Ramón Carrizales then Eduardo Piñate
- Aragua: Rodolfo Clemente Marco Torres and Daniela González
- Barinas: Argenis Chávez then Sergio Garrido
- Bolívar: Justo Noguera Pietri then Ángel Bautista Marcano
- Carabobo: Rafael Lacava
- Cojedes: Margaud Godoy then José Alberto Galíndez
- Delta Amacuro: Lizeta Hernández
- Falcón: Víctor Clark
- Guárico: José Manuel Vásquez
- Lara: Adolfo Pereira Antique
- Mérida: Ramón Guevara
- Miranda: Héctor Rodríguez
- Monagas: Yelitza Santaella and Cosme Arzolay
- Nueva Esparta: Alfredo Díaz then Morel Rodríguez Ávila
- Portuguesa: Rafael Calles then Primitivo Cedeño
- Sucre: Edwin Rojas then Gilberto Pinto Blanco
- Táchira: Laidy Gómez then Freddy Bernal
- Trujillo: Henry Rangel Silva
- Vargas: José Manuel Suárez then José Alejandro Terán
- Yaracuy: Julio León Heredia
- Zulia: Omar Prieto then Manuel Rosales

== Events ==
=== January and February ===
- January 6
  - The European Union (EU) no longer recognizes Juan Guaidó as head of government. They also do not recognize the legitimacy of Nicolas Maduro. The United States and the United Kingdom still recognize Guaidó.
  - The Venezuelan government said it "expresses its concern with the acts of violence that are taking [place] in the city of Washington, United States."
- January 7 – An Iranian ship arrives at the port of La Guaira in defiance of a boycott by the United States.
- January 8 – La Vega raid
- January 17 – COVID-19 pandemic: Six trucks carrying 136,000 liters of oxygen (14,000 individual canisters) set off for Manaus, Amazonas, Brazil.
- January 19
  - U.S. President Donald Trump protects Venezuelan citizens living in the U.S. from deportation for 18 months.
  - Antony Blinken, President-elect Joe Biden's United States Secretary of State, says that the U.S. will continue to recognize Juan Guaidó as legitimate president of Venezuela.
- January 21 – The European Parliament votes 391 votes in favor, 114 against, and 177 abstentions on a non-binding resolution calling on EU governments to recognize Juan Guaidó as Venezuela's interim president.
- January 29 – Some banks issue debit cards in U.S. dollars as a remedy for hyperinflation.
- February 11 – The United States Department of Justice (DOJ) reveals that in 2020 it sold 1.2 million barrels of Iranian oil destined for Venezuela to compensate victims of state-sponsored terrorism.
- February 13 – Twelve Pemon men arrested in 2020 in relation to an attack on a military base in Kumarakapay, Bolívar state, are released.
- February 19 – Maduro offers to sell natural gas to Mexico following a shortage related to the February 13–17, 2021 North American winter storm.
- February 21 – Two paramilitary groups, Autodefensas Gaitanistas del Cartel del Golfo and Los Rastrojos join forces against the Venezuelan Army (ELN) in Táchira.
- February 22 – The EU adds 19 officials to its list of 55 who have been sanctioned for undermining democracy or rights violations.
- February 24 – Venezuela expels Isabel Brilhante Pedrosa, EU ambassador to Venezuela.

=== March and April ===
- March 6
  - The government issues three new bills, worth 200,000, 500,000, and 1,000,000 bolivars. The last is worth US$0.52.
  - President Maduro and First Lady Cilia Flores receive their first doses of Russia's Sputnik V COVID-19 vaccine. The country has received 200,000 doses of the Sputnik V vaccine since February 13 and 500,000 doses of China's Sinopharm BIBP vaccine, which arrived this week. The country reports 141,356 cases of COVID-19 and 1,371 deaths, although critics say the actual numbers are much higher.
- March 8
  - The Biden administration grants temporary protected status to 320,000 Venezuelans living in the U.S. This is more encompassing than the deferred deportation temporarily offered to 145,000 Venezuelans by Trump.
  - Ana Rosario Contreras, human rights activist and nurse, is awarded the International Women of Courage Award.
- March 21 – 2021 Apure clashes: Fighting between FARC and Venezuelan security forces.
- March 27 – Facebook freezes President Maduro's account for thirty days after spreading false information about a COVID-19 miracle cure.
- March 28 – Juan Guaidó confirms he has tested positive for COVID-19.
- April 20 – With over 32.3% of Venezuelans food insecure, the United Nations World Food Programme (WFP) gains permission from the Government of Venezuela to feed over 185,000 students by the end of 2021 and 1.5 million students by end of the 2022–2023 school year through nutritious school meals.

== Deaths ==
=== January and February ===
- 3 January – Salvador Franco, Indigenous rights leader; died in prison, tuberculosis.
- 8 January – Cástor Oswaldo Azuaje Pérez, 69, Roman Catholic prelate, Bishop of Roman Catholic Diocese of Trujillo (since 2012); COVID-19.
- 16 January – Pedro Trebbau, 91, German-born Venezuelan zoologist.
- 18 January – Henrique Salas Albornoz, 68, urologist; COVID-19.
- 31 January – Douglas Bravo, 88, guerrilla fighter (FALN), COVID-19.
- 2 February – Pastor Heydra, journalist and politician; complications from COVID-19.
- 9 February – José Luis Zambrano Padauy, 49, journalist; COVID-19.
- 15 February – Luis Hidalgo, mayor of Boconó (PSUV), Trujillo; COVID-19.

=== March and April ===
- 13 March – Daniela Figueredo, 19, detainee, gunshot.
- 20 March – Rito Jiménez, 70, politician, deputy (since 2020); COVID-19.
- 25 March – Gladys Castillo, 98, pediatrician, First Lady of Venezuela (1984–1988).
- 31 March – Gloria Lizárraga de Capriles, 76, politician, first mayor of the Baruta.
- 5 April – Henry Stephen, 79, singer; complications from COVID-19.
- 9 April
  - Daniel Benítez, 33, footballer (Deportivo Táchira, Deportivo La Guaira); cancer.
  - Helímenas de Jesús Rojo Paredes, 94, Roman Catholic prelate, bishop (1980–1995) and archbishop (1995–2001) of Calabozo.
  - Tulio Manuel Chirivella Varela, 88, Roman Catholic prelate, bishop of Margarita (1974–1982) and archbishop of Barquisimeto (1982–2007); COVID-19.

=== May and June ===
- 18 May – Yolanda Tortolero, politician, deputy; complications from COVID-19

=== July and August ===
- 1 August – Rossana Ordóñez, 70, journalist, pancreatic cancer.

== Media ==
- La última pieza, directed by Ricardo Muñoz Senior.

== See also ==
- COVID-19 pandemic in Venezuela
- Hyperinflation in Venezuela
- 2021 in politics and government
- 2020s
- 2020s in political history
