= 2020 in Venezuela =

- Centuries: 19th; 20th; 21st
- Decades: 2000s; 2010s; 2020s
- See also: Other events of 2020; Years in Venezuela; Timeline of Venezuelan history

The following lists events in the year 2020 in Venezuela.

== Incumbents ==
- President: Nicolás Maduro, Juan Guaidó (presidential crisis)
- Vice President: Delcy Rodríguez

=== Governors ===
- Amazonas: Miguel Rodríguez
- Anzoátegui: Antonio Barreto Sira
- Apure: Ramón Carrizales
- Aragua: Rodolfo Clemente Marco Torres
- Barinas: Argenis Chávez
- Bolívar: Justo Noguera Pietri
- Carabobo: Rafael Lacava
- Cojedes: Margaud Godoy
- Delta Amacuro: Lizeta Hernández
- Falcón: Víctor Clark
- Guárico: José Manuel Vásquez
- Lara: Carmen Meléndez and Adolfo Pereira Antique
- Mérida: Ramón Guevara
- Miranda: Héctor Rodríguez
- Monagas: Yelitza Santaella
- Nueva Esparta: Alfredo Díaz
- Portuguesa: Rafael Calles
- Sucre: Edwin Rojas
- Táchira: Laidy Gómez
- Trujillo: Henry Rangel Silva
- Vargas: José Manuel Suárez
- Yaracuy: Julio León Heredia
- Zulia: Omar Prieto

== Events ==
=== January to March ===
- 5 January – The 2020 Venezuelan National Assembly Delegated Committee election. Government forces prevent access by opposition leader Juan Guaidó.
- 21 January - The USS Detroit conducts freedom of navigation and intelligence-gathering operations off the coast of Caracas.
- 23 January – A fire occurs in Cagua, with eleven people confirmed dead.
- 17 March – The International Monetary Fund (IMF) turns down Venezuela's request for a US$5 billion (VEF 49.9 billion) loan to fight the COVID-19 pandemic in Venezuela.
- 26 March – The United States accused President Nicolás Maduro of narco-terrorism and offered a $15 million reward for information leading to his arrest. In response, Maduro called US President Donald Trump a “racist cowboy”.
- 28 March – The Russian oil company Rosneft sells its stock in Venezuela to the Russian government.
- 30 March – Attorney General Tarek William Saab summons opposition leader Juan Guaidó for questioning for an alleged "attempted coup d'etat" (Spanish: golpe de estado) and attempted assassination. A weapons cache was recently found in Colombia.
- 31 March – United States Secretary of State Mike Pompeo said that sanctions did not apply to humanitarian aid during the health emergency and that the United States would lift all sanctions if Maduro agreed to organize elections that did not include Maduro in a period of six to twelve months. Pompeo reiterated U.S. support for Juan Guaidó.

=== April ===
- 1 April – U.S. President Donald Trump announces that he is stepping up pressure on President Maduro. Trump sends Navy ships and AWACS planes to the region near Venezuela in the largest military build-up in the region since the 1989 invasion of Panama to remove General Manuel Noriega from power.
- 2 April – The government releases journalist Darvinson Rojas, arrested 21 March.
- 3 April
  - The European Union announces its support of the US-led plan for a transitional government in Venezuela.
  - Hundreds of Venezuelan migrants return from Colombia.
  - The National Bolivarian Armed Forces of Venezuela prepare artillery for a possible attack by the United States.
  - The Venezuelan patrol boat Naiguata rams the Portuguese-flagged RCGS Resolute, which was accused of piracy. The Naiguata sinks.
- 16 April – The 30-ton ″Kueka stone″ is returned to the Pemon people, 34 years after it was taken to Berlin, Germany. The stone represents the story of star-cross lovers, each turned to stone by a deity as punishment for marrying a member of another tribe.
- 17 April
  - Venezuela suffers its worst crisis since Maduro took office. The U.S. has a price on Madur′os head, a fleet of warships patrols the waters around the country, the coronavirus pandemic rages, gasoline shortages threaten food supplies, and a lack of liquidity makes it nearly impossible to resolve the crisis. Venezuela is caught in the middle of an international power play by the United States, Russia, and China.
  - The National Assembly, which is controlled by Juan Guaidó, authorizes the transfer of US$342 million at an account in Citibank to an account at the Federal Reserve Bank of New York. Guaidó had earlier seized control of Venezuelan government assets held in the United States, including Citgo, the US-based subsidiary of the state oil company Petróleos de Venezuela, S.A. (PDVSA).
- 22 April – An Iranian Airbus A340-642 lands in Paraguaná Peninsula. There is speculation that the flight may be related to drug trafficking.
- 23 April
  - Elliott Abrams, the United States special representative for Venezuela, says that "many people" both inside and outside the Maduro government support the proposed U.S. transition to a government that would involve neither Maduro nor Guaidó.
  - Two flights of Iranian technicians have arrived to help run the Paraguaná Refinery Complex. 14 more flights of technicians are expected soon.
  - Opposition lawmakers approved a payment of US$5,000 per month for themselves as part of a plan to help health professionals during the coronavirus pandemic. Doctors and nurses will get a one-time US$100 each.
- 27 April – Maduro appoints Tareck El Aissami oil minister and Asdrúbal Chávez to head PDVSA. The government of the United States has offered a $10 million bounty for the arrest of El Aissami, who is on the Immigration and Customs Enforcement (ICE) ten-most-wanted list.
- April 29 – 500 Venezuela migrants living in Colombia block a highway in protest of the lockdown due to the COVID-19 pandemic in Colombia. They say the makes it impossible for them to work. There are 1.8 million Venezuelan migrants living in Colombia.
- 30 April – Maduro refuses to bow to pressure from Brazil to remove its diplomatic personal by May 2.

=== May ===
- 1 May – Guanare prison riot: A riot and attempted escape attempt leaves 47 dead and 75 injured in the Centro Penitenciario de los Llanos in Guanare, Portuguesa State.
- 4 May – Eight dissidents were killed and seventeen were captured after a failed beach landing in Macuto, Vargas state, including the two Americans, organized by the private security company Silvercorp USA and headed by Jordan Goudreau in the codenamed Operation Gideon.
- 12 May – Passenger flights are banned for thirty days.
- 13 May – Criminal charges are filed against the prison warden and five guards following the riot in Guanare that left 47 inmates dead and dozens more injured.
- 14 May – Defense Minister Vladimir Padrino tells state television that its troops captured 39 army deserters on the Colombian border.
- 19 May – The government sends the military to put down protests in Barquisimeto, Iribarren Municipality. Five arrested.
- 20 May – The Maduro government sues the Bank of England, accusing it of stealing 31 tons of gold. Maduro said, "It is the colonial war against Venezuela!"
- 25 May – Dozens of people from Sucre Municipality, Miranda protest because they have not had water for 57 days.

=== June ===
- 13 June – Authorities in Cape Verde arrest Alex Saab, a businessman accused by the U.S. of corrupt dealings with President Nicolás Maduro's government, while en route to Iran.
- 15 June – The conservative Spanish newspaper ′′ABC′′ reported on June 15 that then-Foreign Minister of Venezuela Nicolás Maduro paid Gianroberto Casaleggio €3.5 million in 2010 to finance an ″anticapitalist, leftist movement in the Italian Republic,″ which makes up the Italian political party Five Star Movement today. Casaleggio's son, Davide Casaleggio said this was fake news that had already surfaced in 2016.

=== July ===
- July 13 – Former New Mexico governor Bill Richardson plans to travel this week to Venezuela to urge President Nicolás Maduro to free two American mercenaries and six jailed oil executives as a goodwill gesture aimed at easing tensions with the U.S.
- July 15
  - COVID-19 pandemic: Miranda (state) and Caracas join Zulia in quarantine.
  - Federico Villegas, Argentine ambassador, expresses his concerns about human rights in Venezuela and demands free elections.

=== August ===
- August 13 – The National Assembly demands information about an oi spill near Falcón state.
- August 14 – Satellite TV returns for 2,000,000 subscribers of DirecTV.
- August 19
  - Amnesty International Latin America condemns the Maduro government for mistreatment of health care workers who criticize the government's response to the COVID-19 pandemic.
  - COVID-19 pandemic in Venezuela: Venezuela again reports over 1,000 new infections in 24-hours. There are a total of 36,878 confirmed cases, 11,149 of whom are active and 561 have died.
- August 21 – Juan Guaidó calls for the cancellation of the December 6 parliamentary elections, citing fraud.
- August 25 – The Attorney General of Cape Verde opens an investigation into two men who posed as representatives of President Maduro in favor of Colombian Alex Saab.

=== September ===
- 5 September – Amnesty International condemns the June 2019 torture and killing of Navy Captain Rafael Acosta Arévalo.
- 6 September – The NGO Programa Venezolano de Educación-Acción (Venezuelan Program for Education-Action, Provea) reports 1,500 extrajudicial killings by pro-Madero forces in 2020.
- 12 September – Maduro claims a U.S. man, a former CIA agent in Iraq, is caught spying on the refineries in Falcón.
- 14 September – In-person classes are suspended until January. Estado Vive TV will become a "superchannel" and will play a fundamental role in education.
- 16 September – The United Nations Commission on Human Rights accuses Maduro, Defense Minister Vladimir Padrino López, and Interior Minister Néstor Reverol of serious crimes amid human rights violations.

=== December ===
- 6 December – 2020 Venezuelan parliamentary election: Turnout is 31% as Maduro's government is reelected with 67.6%, the traditional opposition won 17.95%, and dissidents on the left won 3% of the vote. Eighteen countries in America (including the United States and Canada but excluding Argentina, Bolivia, and Mexico) call the election fraudulent and illegal.
- 7-12 December – Opposition leaders claim that 2.4 million people 845,000 Venezuelans abroad voted online and 3 million voted in person on "popular consultation" to repudiate President Nicolas Maduro's government.
- 29 December – COVID-19 pandemic: Venezuela signs a contract to acquire enough doses of Russia's Sputnik V vaccine for 10 million people. There have been 112,636 confirmed cases and 1,018 deaths in the country.
- 30 December – The U.S. sanctions Judge Lorena Carolina Cornielles Ruiz and prosecutor Ramon Antonio Torres Espinoza following the conviction of six American oil executives.
- 31 December
  - Halliburton removes all its staff in Venezuela.
  - The Supreme Court rules that a move by the opposition-controlled National Assembly to extend its term an additional year is invalid.

== Deaths ==
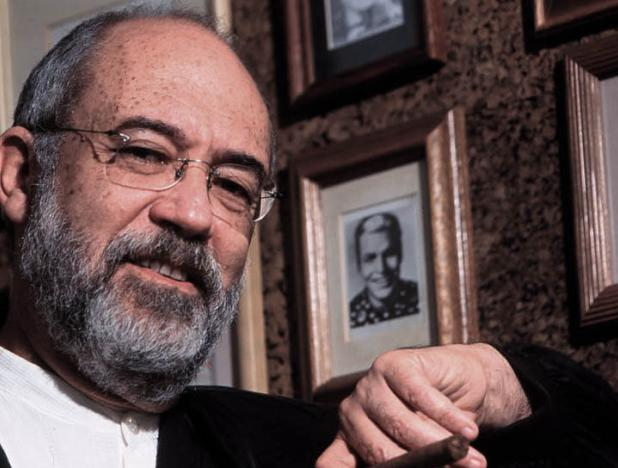
Alberto Naranjo

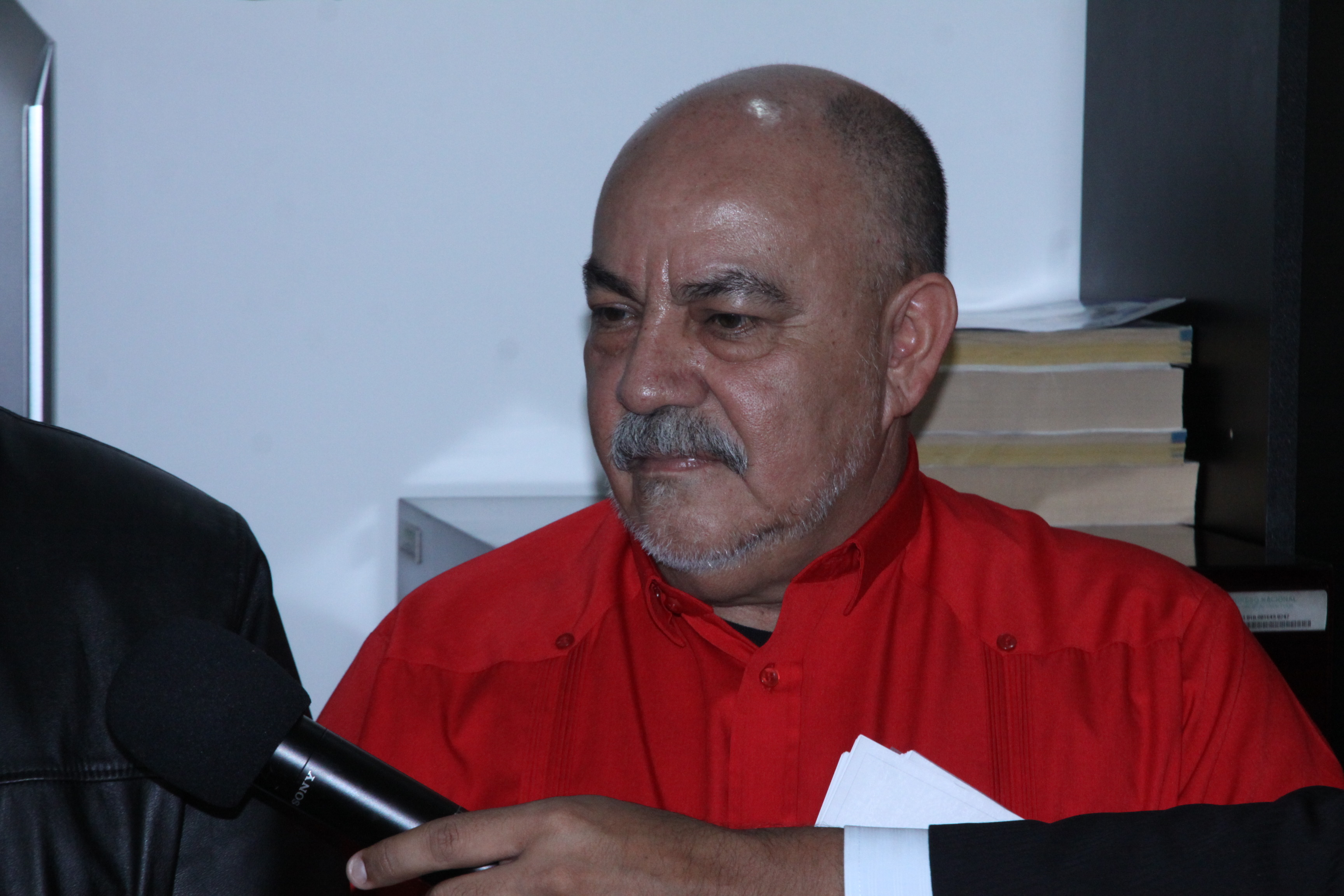
Darío Vivas

=== January to April ===
- 22 January – Addy Valero, politician (b. 1969).
- 27 January – Alberto Naranjo, musician (b. 1941).
- 16 April – Carlos Donoso, 72, comedian, singer and screenwriter, lung cancer.

=== May to August ===
- 24 May – Jorge Spiteri, 69, rock musician; cancer
- 12 June – Ocean Bay, prize-winning racehorse; butchered
- 7 July – Hernán Alemán, 65, politician, Deputy (since 2011) and mayor of Cabimas (1989–1996, 2000–2008); COVID-19.
- 8 July – Daniel Alvarado, 70, actor (La revancha, Pecado de amor, My Sweet Fat Valentina); fall.
- 14 July – Hernán Alemán, 65, opposition politician; COVID-19.
- 25 July – Flor Isava Fonseca, 99, journalist and sports executive.
- 5 August
  - Jesús Berardinelli, 61, sporting executive, president of the Venezuelan Football Federation (since 2020); respiratory failure.
  - Blanca Rodríguez, 94, socialite, First Lady of Venezuela (1974–1979, 1989–1993); respiratory failure.
- 13 August
  - Luchita Hurtado, 99, Venezuelan-born American painter.
  - Darío Vivas, governor of Venezuela's Capital District; COVID-19.
- 21 August – Remy Hermoso, 72, baseball player (Montreal Expos, Cleveland Indians, Atlanta Braves).
- 23 August – Zuray Marcano, 66, Paralympic powerlifter.
- 29 August
  - José Gregorio Guevara, 52, politician, Mayor of Achaguas Municipality (since 2013); COVID-19.
  - Domingo Rivas, 87, Olympic racing cyclist (1956).

=== September to December ===
- 17 September - Carlos Villamizar, 85, actor
- 6 November – Johnny Paredes, 58, baseball player (Montreal Expos, Detroit Tigers), cancer.
- 3 October – Anthony Galindo, 41, singer (Menudo, MDO); suicide.
- 10 December – Rafael Ramón Conde Alfonzo, 77, Roman Catholic prelate, Bishop of Roman Catholic Diocese of Maracay (2008–2009) and Roman Catholic Diocese of Margarita (1999–2008); pancreatic cancer.
- 17 December – Bolivia Suárez, 63, politician, Deputy (since 2016); COVID-19.
- 18 December – José Vicente Rangel, 91, politician, Vice President (2002–2007) and Minister of Foreign Affairs (1999–2001); cardiac arrest.
- 26 December – Víctor Cuica, 71, saxophonist and actor.

== See also ==
- COVID-19 pandemic in Venezuela
- Hyperinflation in Venezuela
- 2020 in the Caribbean
- 2020 in Brazil
- 2020 in Colombia
- 2020 in Ecuador
- 2020 in Peru
- 2020 Venezuelan Primera División season
- Operación Alacrán
- 2020 in politics and government
- 2020s
- 2020s in political history
