= 2017 in Venezuela =

- Centuries: 19th; 20th; 21st
- Decades: 1990s; 2000s; 2010s; 2020s
- See also: Other events of 2017; Years in Venezuela; Timeline of Venezuelan history

The following lists events in the year 2017 in Venezuela.

== Incumbents ==
- President: Nicolás Maduro
- Vice President: Aristóbulo Istúriz (until January 4), Tareck El Aissami (starting January 4)

=== Governors ===
- Amazonas: Liborio Guarulla then Miguel Rodríguez
- Anzoátegui: Nelson Moreno then Antonio Barreto Sira
- Apure: Ramón Carrizales
- Aragua: Caryl Bertho then Rodolfo Clemente Marco Torres
- Barinas: Zenaida Gallardo then Argenis Chávez
- Bolívar: Francisco Rangel Gómez then Justo Noguera Pietri
- Carabobo: Gustavo Pulido Cardier then Rafael Lacava
- Cojedes: Margaud Godoy
- Delta Amacuro: Lizeta Hernández
- Falcón: Stella Lugo then Víctor Clark
- Guárico: Ramón Rodríguez Chacín then José Manuel Vásquez
- Lara: Henri Falcón (until October 16); Carmen Meléndez (starting October 16)
- Mérida: Alexis Ramirez then Ramón Guevara
- Miranda: Henrique Capriles Radonski then Héctor Rodríguez
- Monagas: Yelitza Santaella
- Nueva Esparta: Carlos Mata Figueroa then Alfredo Díaz
- Portuguesa: Reinaldo Castañeda then Rafael Calles
- Sucre: Edwin Rojas
- Táchira: José Vielma Mora then Laidy Gómez
- Trujillo: Henry Rangel Silva
- Vargas: Jorge García Carneiro
- Yaracuy: Julio León Heredia
- Zulia: Francisco Arias Cárdenas then Juan Pablo Guanipa then Magdely Valbuena then Omar Prieto

== Events ==
For events regarding the protests, see Timeline of the 2017 Venezuelan protests.

=== February ===
- 14 February - The United States sanctions Vice President El Aissami over allegations of playing a role in drug trafficking, freezing his assets in the US and barring him from entering the country.
- 15 February - Venezuela bans CNN from the country after allegations of spreading propaganda.

=== July ===
- 4 July - A Gulfstream III operated by SATA (Servicio Coordinado de Transporte de Aéreo del Ejecutivo Nacional) and used by the Venezuelan Vice President crashed into the sea on the outskirts of Margarita Island. Two bodies were recovered from the wreckage while the other seven were declared missing.
- 15 October - The Bolivarian government Great Patriotic Pole won 18 of the 23 governorships while the opposition only 5 during the 2017 Venezuelan regional elections

=== December ===
- 3 December - President Nicolás Maduro announces the creation of a new cryptocurrency the petro.
- 10 December - The Bolivarian government Great Patriotic Pole won 306 of the 337 Mayorships during the 2017 Venezuelan municipal elections.

== Deaths ==
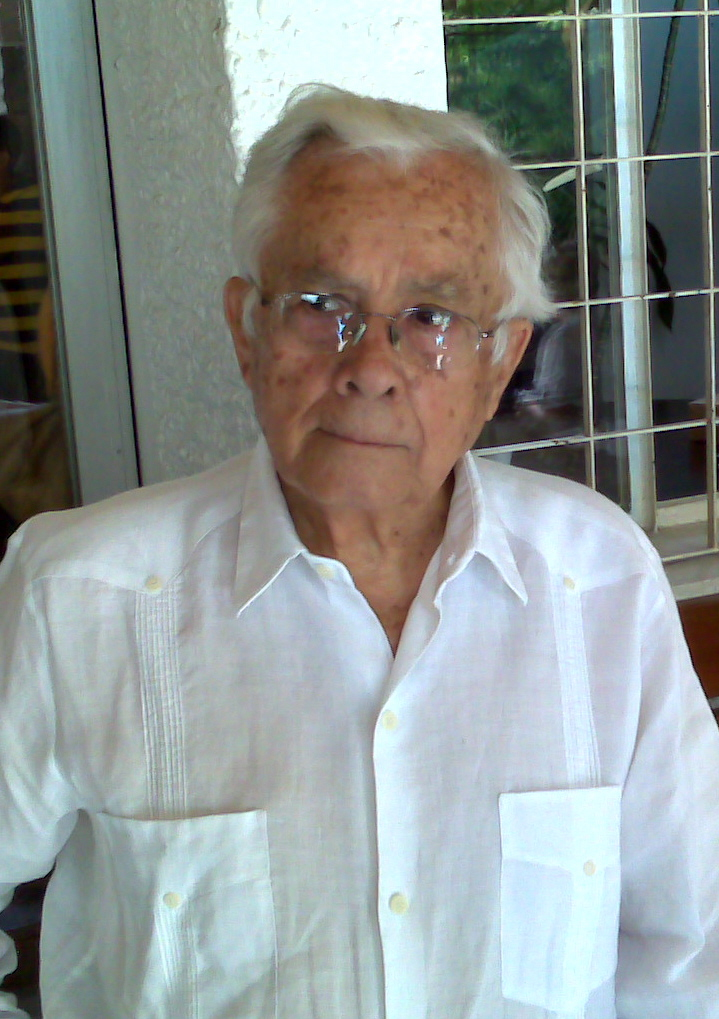
Octavio Lepage

- 1 January – Memo Morales, singer (b. 1937).
- 6 January – Octavio Lepage, politician (b. 1923).
- 30 January – Yescia Bloom, model (b. c. 1990)
- 26 June – Isaías Pimentel, tennis player (b. 1933)
