= 2022 in Venezuela =

- Centuries: 19th; 20th; 21st
- Decades: 2000s; 2010s; 2020s
- See also: Other events of 2022; Years in Venezuela; Timeline of Venezuelan history

The following lists events in the year 2022 in Venezuela.

== Incumbents ==
- President: Nicolás Maduro, Juan Guaidó (presidential crisis)
- Vice President: Delcy Rodríguez

=== Governors ===
- Amazonas: Miguel Rodríguez
- Anzoátegui: Luis José Marcano Salazar
- Apure: Eduardo Piñate
- Aragua: Rodolfo Clemente Marco Torres and Daniela González
- Barinas: Sergio Garrido
- Bolívar: Ángel Bautista Marcano
- Carabobo: Rafael Lacava
- Cojedes: José Alberto Galíndez
- Delta Amacuro: Lizeta Hernández
- Falcón: Víctor Clark
- Guárico: José Manuel Vásquez
- Lara: Adolfo Pereira Antique
- Mérida: Jehyson Guzmán
- Miranda: Héctor Rodríguez
- Monagas: Yelitza Santaella and Cosme Arzolay
- Nueva Esparta: Morel Rodríguez Ávila
- Portuguesa: Rafael Calles
- Sucre: Gilberto Pinto Blanco
- Táchira: Freddy Bernal
- Trujillo: Gerardo Marquez
- Vargas: José Alejandro Terán
- Yaracuy: Julio León Heredia
- Zulia: Manuel Rosales

== Events ==
- 25 January – Brazil and Venezuela will reopen their border after a two year closure due to the COVID-19 pandemic.
- 6 March – The United States start talks with Venezuela about supplies of its oil, currently under sanctions, in an attempt to substitute the Russian crude. So far the talks yielded few results.
- 8 March – U.S. President Joe Biden announces that Venezuela has freed two Americans, Gustavo Cardenas and Jorge Fernandez, after being detained in the country.
- 14 May – Venezuela announces that it will sell 5–10% shares in state-owned companies to private investors in order to help fund state enterprises.
- 17 May – The United States lifts some economic sanctions on Venezuela, including allowing the Chevron Corporation to negotiate its license with the Venezuelan PDVSA state-owned oil company and removing the names of some Venezuelan officials from a United States government list of sanctioned individuals.
- 25 May – Colombian and Venezuelan intelligence officials confirm the death of Miguel Botache Santillana, alias Gentil Duarte, the top leader of the FARC dissidents.
- 11 June – Top oil and petrochemicals producers Iran and Venezuela sign a 20-year economic cooperation agreement.
- 12 June – Authorities in Argentina seize an Iranian Boeing 747 which was transferred to Venezuela last year. It is unclear if the impound is related to sanctions that have been imposed on both countries.
- 28 August – Colombia and Venezuela restore diplomatic relations after three years.
- 9 October – A landslide caused by days of torrential rain kills at least 22 people in Santos Michelena.

== Deaths ==
- 8 January – José Curiel, 84, politician, governor of Falcón (1996–2000)
- 18 January – Elio Pietrini, 83, Argentine-Venezuelan actor (Abigail, Amores de fin de siglo, Destino de Mujer)
- 23 January – Narciso Debourg, 96, sculptor
- 25 January – Ramón Martínez, 73, politician, senator (1998–2000) and governor of Sucre (1992–1998, 2000–2008)
- 26 January – Esther Alzaibar, 91, ceramic artist
- 8 February – Arnaldo Arocha, 85, politician, deputy (1969–1974, 1984–1989) and twice governor of Miranda
- 12 February – Gladys Guarisma, 83, linguist
- 16 February –
  - Américo Martín, 84, politician, deputy (1979–1984)
  - José Enrique Sarabia, 81, musician and songwriter
- 23 February – Ramón José Viloria Pinzón, 62, Roman Catholic prelate, bishop of Puerto Cabello (2004–2010)
- 14 May – América Alonso, 85, actress
- 8 August – Luis Enrique Oberto, 93, politician, member (1979–1999) and president (1990–1994) of the Chamber of Deputies, minister of finance (1972–1974)
- 6 September – Tina Ramirez, 92, Venezuelan-born American dancer and choreographer

== See also ==
- COVID-19 pandemic in Venezuela
- Hyperinflation in Venezuela
- 2022 in politics and government
- 2020s
- 2020s in political history
