= 2015 in Venezuela =

- Centuries: 19th; 20th; 21st
- Decades: 1990s; 2000s; 2010s; 2020s
- See also: Other events of 2015; Years in Venezuela; Timeline of Venezuelan history

The following lists events that happened during 2015 in Venezuela.

== Incumbents ==
- President: Nicolás Maduro
- Vice President: Jorge Arreaza

=== Governors ===
- Amazonas: Liborio Guarulla
- Anzoátegui: Aristóbulo Istúriz
- Apure: Ramón Carrizales
- Aragua: Tareck El Aissami
- Barinas: Adán Chávez
- Bolívar: Francisco Rangel Gómez
- Carabobo: Francisco Ameliach
- Cojedes: Erika Farías
- Delta Amacuro: Lizeta Hernández
- Falcón: Stella Lugo
- Guárico: Ramón Rodríguez Chacín
- Lara: Henri Falcón
- Mérida: Alexis Ramirez
- Miranda: Henrique Capriles Radonski
- Monagas: Yelitza Santaella
- Nueva Esparta: Carlos Mata Figueroa
- Portuguesa: Wilmar Castro
- Sucre: Luis Acuña
- Táchira: José Vielma Mora
- Trujillo: Henry Rangel Silva
- Vargas: Jorge García Carneiro
- Yaracuy: Julio León Heredia
- Zulia: Francisco Arias Cárdenas

== Events ==
=== February ===
- 19 February — Venezuelan police arrest the Opposition Mayor of Caracas Antonio Ledezma without a warrant on the anniversary of the arrest of another opposition leader Leopoldo Lopez. The President of Venezuela Nicolas Maduro accused him of organizing a coup d'état with the support of the United States but the US has denied this.
- 24 February — in San Cristóbal, Táchira, Kluivert Roa is killed by an officer of the Policía Nacional Bolivariana in a protest against President Nicolás Maduro.

=== March ===
- 9 March — U.S. President Barack Obama signs an executive order declaring Venezuela a national security threat to the U.S.
- 15 March — The National Assembly passed the Anti-Imperialist Enabling Law to President Nicolás Maduro, that allows him to legislate from 15 March to 31 December.

== Media ==
- El desertor, directed by Raúl Chamorro.
