= 2019 in Venezuela =

- Centuries: 19th; 20th; 21st
- Decades: 1990s; 2000s; 2010s; 2020s
- See also: Other events of 2019; Years in Venezuela; Timeline of Venezuelan history

Events of 2019 in Venezuela.

== Incumbents ==
- President: Nicolás Maduro, Juan Guaidó (presidential crisis)
- Vice President: Delcy Rodríguez

=== Governors ===
- Amazonas: Miguel Rodríguez
- Anzoátegui: Antonio Barreto Sira
- Apure: Ramón Carrizales
- Aragua: Rodolfo Clemente Marco Torres
- Barinas: Argenis Chávez
- Bolívar: Justo Noguera Pietri
- Carabobo: Rafael Lacava
- Cojedes: Margaud Godoy
- Delta Amacuro: Lizeta Hernández
- Falcón: Víctor Clark
- Guárico: José Manuel Vásquez
- Lara: Carmen Meléndez and Adolfo Pereira Antique
- Mérida: Ramón Guevara
- Miranda: Héctor Rodríguez
- Monagas: Yelitza Santaella
- Nueva Esparta: Alfredo Díaz
- Portuguesa: Rafael Calles
- Sucre: Edwin Rojas
- Táchira: Laidy Gómez
- Trujillo: Henry Rangel Silva
- Vargas: Jorge García Carneiro
- Yaracuy: Julio León Heredia
- Zulia: Omar Prieto

== Events ==
=== January ===
- 10 January – Nicolás Maduro is sworn in for a new term following a widely condemned 2018 presidential election.
- 23 January –
  - A 4.5 magnitude earthquake hits in Sucre.
  - Juan Guaidó swears himself in as President, recognized by the US, Canada, and multiple Latin American nations. Nicolás Maduro refuses to step down, breaks off diplomatic relations with the US, and orders American diplomats to leave within 72 hours.
  - Massive anti-government protests happen in Venezuela; security forces use force, resulting in at least 26 deaths and 364 detentions.
- FAES officers in Caracas kill Juan Diego Rodríguez and Kelvin Otero Paz during separate home raids; Alan Molina, detained with Otero Paz, is held in custody with drugs planted on him.

=== March ===
- 7 March – Venezuela suffers its largest blackout in history, affecting all states and leaving Caracas without power for three days and much of the country for a week.
- 21 March – Roberto Marrero, Juan Guaidó’s chief of staff, is arrested by Sebin agents; the authorities cite insurrection and weapons, while the move sparks international condemnation.

=== April ===
- 30 April –
  - Leopoldo López appears alongside Juan Guaidó near La Carlota air base in Caracas after being freed from house arrest, sparking major protests; he later takes refuge at the Spanish embassy.
  - Juan Guaidó calls on the military to oust Maduro; Maduro stays in power backed by the military, amid international reactions.
- Opposition leader Leopoldo López, under house arrest, participates in an attempted military uprising; Venezuelan authorities respond by detaining military personnel and cracking down on supporters.

=== May ===
- 16 May – U.S. authorities raid the Venezuelan Embassy in Washington, D.C., arresting protesters and handing control to representatives of Juan Guaidó.
- National Assembly vice president Edgar Zambrano is detained for alleged involvement in the April uprising; many opposition legislators flee the country or seek refuge in embassies.

=== June ===
- 7 June – The UNHCR and IOM report that Venezuelan refugees and migrants surpass 4 million, making it one of the largest displacement crises globally.

=== July ===
- 22 July – A major blackout hits over half of Venezuela’s states, including Caracas; the government blames it on an “electromagnetic attack.”

=== August ===
- 20 August – Venezuela introduces the bolívar soberano, removing five zeros from the currency, and increasing the minimum wage thirty-fold in an attempt to stabilize prices.
- The Supreme Court suspends leadership at the Central University of Venezuela, mandating new elections at nine public universities, as César Trómpiz is appointed to lead new university education policies.
- The Bolivarian Militia is integrated into the National Guard; the government begins distributing over 321,000 rifles for Christmas security patrols.

=== December ===
- Two opposition deputies, Janet Fernández and Fernando Orozco, are arrested for an alleged conspiracy against Maduro.

== Deaths ==
=== March ===
- March 6 – Alí Domínguez, journalist (b. 1992)

=== May ===
- May 2 – Juan Vicente Torrealba, harpist and composer (b. 1917)

=== July ===
- July 27 – Carmen Victoria Pérez, television hostess and broadcaster (b. 1941)
