= List of Venezuela state legislatures =

This is a list of the state-level legislative councils of Venezuela. Legislative Authority is exercised in each State by a Legislative Council, consisting of no more than fifteen and at least seven members, who proportionally represent the population of the State and the Municipalities. The Legislative Council has the following powers:

(1) To legislate matters within state competence.

(2) Pass the state's Budget Law.

(3) Any others vested in it by this Constitution or by the law.

State legislators are elected for a four-year term, eligible for reelection for only two terms.

== List ==
State	Flag	State council	Members	Map	State executive
Amazonas		Legislative Council of Amazonas	7		Governor of Amazonas
Anzoategui		Legislative Council of Anzoátegui	15		Governor of Anzoátegui
Apure		Legislative Council of Apure	7		Governor of Apure
Aragua		Legislative Council of Aragua	15		Governor of Aragua
Barinas		Legislative Council of Barinas	11		Governor of Barinas
Bolivar		Legislative Council of Bolívar	15		Governor of Bolívar
Carabobo		Legislative Council of Carabobo	15		Governor of Carabobo
Cojedes		Legislative Council of Cojedes	9		Governor of Cojedes
Delta Amacuro		Legislative Council of Delta Amacuro	7		Governor of Delta Amacuro
Falcon		Legislative Council of Falcón	11		Governor of Falcón
Guarico		Legislative Council of Guárico	7		Governor of Guárico
Lara		Legislative Council of Lara	15		Governor of Lara
Merida		Legislative Council of Mérida	9		Governor of Mérida
Miranda		Legislative Council of Miranda	15		Governor of Miranda
Monagas		Legislative Council of Monagas	11		Governor of Monagas
Nueva Esparta		Legislative Council of Nueva Esparta	7		Governor of Nueva Esparta
Portuguesa		Legislative Council of Portuguesa	11		Governor of Portuguesa
Sucre		Legislative Council of Sucre	11		Governor of Sucre
Tachira		Legislative Council of Táchira	13		Governor of Táchira
Trujillo		Legislative Council of Trujillo	9		Governor of Trujillo
Vargas		Legislative Council of Vargas	7		Governor of Vargas
Yaracuy		Legislative Council of Yaracuy	9		Governor of Yaracuy
Zulia		Legislative Council of Zulia	15		Governor of Zulia
