= 2018 in Venezuela =

- Centuries: 19th; 20th; 21st
- Decades: 1990s; 2000s; 2010s; 2020s
- See also: Other events of 2018; Years in Venezuela; Timeline of Venezuelan history

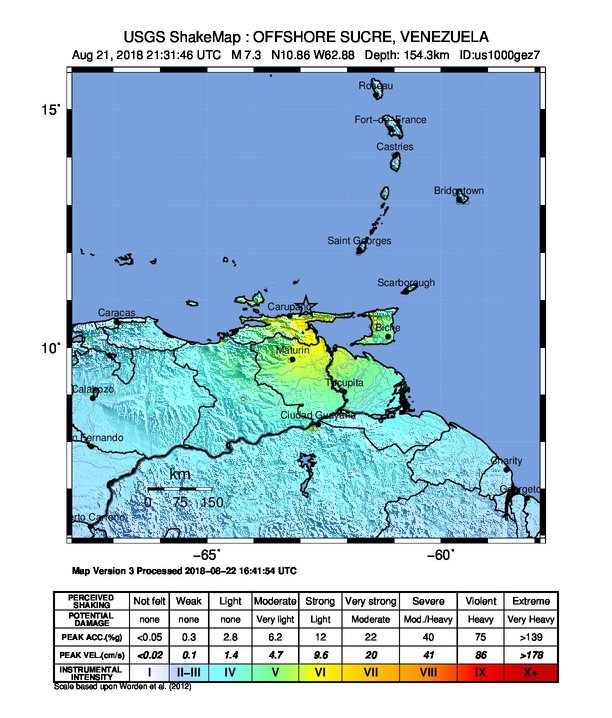
Shakemap for the August 2018 Venezuela earthquake

The following lists events that happened during 2018 in Venezuela.

== Incumbents ==
- President: Nicolás Maduro
- Vice President: Tareck El Aissami and Delcy Rodríguez

=== Governors ===
- Amazonas: Miguel Rodríguez
- Anzoátegui: Antonio Barreto Sira
- Apure: Ramón Carrizales
- Aragua: Rodolfo Clemente Marco Torres
- Barinas: Argenis Chávez
- Bolívar: Justo Noguera Pietri
- Carabobo: Rafael Lacava
- Cojedes: Margaud Godoy
- Delta Amacuro: Lizeta Hernández
- Falcón: Víctor Clark
- Guárico: José Manuel Vásquez
- Lara: Carmen Meléndez
- Mérida: Ramón Guevara
- Miranda: Héctor Rodríguez
- Monagas: Yelitza Santaella
- Nueva Esparta: Alfredo Díaz
- Portuguesa: Rafael Calles
- Sucre: Edwin Rojas
- Táchira: Laidy Gómez
- Trujillo: Henry Rangel Silva
- Vargas: Jorge García Carneiro
- Yaracuy: Julio León Heredia
- Zulia: Omar Prieto

== Events ==
=== January ===
- January 5
  - Looting was recorded in different Venezuelan cities, such as the ports of Altagracia, Caicara del Orinoco, Maturín, and Terrazas del Avila, among others.
  - Omar Barboza was sworn in as the new President of the National Assembly.
  - Maduro ordered the closure of the borders with the islands of Aruba, Curaçao and Bonaire.
- January 6 - The government demands shops lower prices leading to hundreds of people to take advantage of this and line up.
- January 8
  - Claudio Fermin announced his candidacy for presidential elections.
  - According to the National Assembly, Venezuela's inflation is set at 2616% for 2017.
- January 12 - Motorcycle gunmen kill pro-government legislator in Venezuela.
- January 18
  - Countries of the European Union impose sanctions on Venezuelan officials, such as Néstor Reverol, Minister of Interior, Justice and peace; Maikel Moreno, president of the Supreme Court of Justice; and Diosdado Cabello, member of the United Socialist Party of Venezuela.
  - Relatives demanded in the morgue of Bello Monte the delivery of the bodies of the massacre of El Junquito, among which are Óscar Alberto Pérez.
  - Ramos Allup announced his candidacy for presidential primary.
- January 20 - They were buried without death certificates, two members of the slaughter of Junquito, where Oscar Perez was murdered.
- January 21
  - The body of Oscar Perez is buried at dawn, in the Cementerio del Este (East Cemetery).
  - In a terrorist attack in a hotel in Kabul, two Venezuelans died.

=== April ===
- April 10 - President Nicolás Maduro announced that will not attend Summit of Américas in Lima, Peru.

=== May ===
- May 20 - The 2018 Venezuelan presidential election was held with incumbent President Nicolás Maduro reelected with 67.8% of the vote.

=== August ===
- August 4 - At least two drones armed with explosives detonated in the area where president Nicolás Maduro was delivering an address to military officers in Venezuela.
- August 21 - A magnitude 7.3 earthquake struck just off the northern coast of Venezuela, near Cariaco, Sucre.

=== October ===
- October 2 - Per a report from the International Monetary Fund (IMF), as reported by Bloomberg, Venezuela’s annual inflation rate was predicted to surge to 1.37 million percent by the end of the year. The prediction is up from as estimate of 1 million percent in July, and more than 100 times greater than the IMF's January estimate of 13,000 percent. The report went on to estimate that gross domestic product would shrink 18% in 2018.

== Deaths ==
- Diego Rísquez (b. 1949), film director
