= 2013 in Venezuela =

- Centuries: 19th; 20th; 21st
- Decades: 1990s; 2000s; 2010s; 2020s
- See also: Other events of 2013; Years in Venezuela; Timeline of Venezuelan history

The following lists events that happened during 2013 in Venezuela.

== Incumbents ==
- President:
  - until March 5: Hugo Chavez
  - March 5-April 19: Nicolás Maduro (interim)
  - starting April 19: Nicolás Maduro
- Vice President:
  - until March 5: Nicolás Maduro
  - March 5-April 19: vacant
  - starting April 19: Jorge Arreaza

=== Governors ===
- Amazonas: Liborio Guarulla
- Anzoátegui: Aristóbulo Istúriz
- Apure: Ramón Carrizales
- Aragua: Tareck El Aissami
- Barinas: Adán Chávez
- Bolívar: Francisco Rangel Gómez
- Carabobo: Francisco Ameliach
- Cojedes: Erika Farías
- Delta Amacuro: Lizeta Hernández
- Falcón: Stella Lugo
- Guárico: Ramón Rodríguez Chacín
- Lara: Henri Falcón
- Mérida: Alexis Ramirez
- Miranda: Henrique Capriles Radonski
- Monagas: Yelitza Santaella
- Nueva Esparta: Carlos Mata Figueroa
- Portuguesa: Wilmar Castro
- Sucre: Luis Acuña
- Táchira: José Vielma Mora
- Trujillo: Henry Rangel Silva
- Vargas: Jorge García Carneiro
- Yaracuy: Julio León Heredia
- Zulia: Francisco Arias Cárdenas

== Events ==
=== February ===
- February 7 - Increase the value of the Tax Unit 107 bolivars.

=== March ===
- March 5 — Venezuelan President Hugo Chávez dies aged 58, in the Military Hospital.

=== April ===
- April 14 – interim president Nicolás Maduro wins presidential election.

== Deaths ==
- May 23 - Luis Zuloaga, 90, baseball player
