= 2012 in Venezuela =

- Centuries: 19th; 20th; 21st
- Decades: 1990s; 2000s; 2010s; 2020s
- See also: Other events of 2012; Years in Venezuela; Timeline of Venezuelan history

The following lists events that happened during 2012 in Venezuela.

== Incumbents ==
- President: Hugo Chavez
- Vice President:
  - until October 13: Elias Jaua
  - starting October 13: Nicolás Maduro

=== Governors ===
- Amazonas: Liborio Guarulla
- Anzoátegui: Tarek William Saab then Aristóbulo Istúriz
- Apure: Rafael Isea then Ramón Carrizales
- Aragua: Tareck El Aissami
- Barinas: Hugo de los Reyes Chávez then Adán Chávez
- Bolívar: Francisco Rangel Gómez
- Carabobo: Henrique Salas Feo then Francisco Ameliach
- Cojedes: Erika Farías
- Delta Amacuro: Lizeta Hernández
- Falcón: Stella Lugo
- Guárico: Luis Gallardo then Ramón Rodríguez Chacín
- Lara: Luis Reyes Reyes then Henri Falcón
- Mérida: Marcos Díaz Orellana then Alexis Ramirez
- Miranda: Henrique Capriles Radonski
- Monagas: José Gregorio Briceño then Yelitza Santaella
- Nueva Esparta: Carlos Mata Figueroa
- Portuguesa: Wilmar Castro
- Sucre: Luis Acuña
- Táchira: César Pérez Vivas then José Vielma Mora
- Trujillo: Hugo Cabezas then Henry Rangel Silva
- Vargas: Jorge García Carneiro
- Yaracuy: Julio León Heredia
- Zulia: Pablo Pérez Álvarez then Francisco Arias Cárdenas

== Deaths ==
- 28 March: Feliciano Carvallo (b. 1920) — painter.
- 2 April: Jesús Aguilarte (b. 1959) — politician.
- 13 April: Verónica Gómez Carabali (b. 1985) - volleyball player.
- 2 May: Lourdes Valera (b. 1963) — actress.
- 17 June: Herman "Chiquitín" Ettedgui (b. 1917) — sportsman, journalist and sports promoter.
- 22 June: María Teresa Castillo (b. 1908) — activist, journalist, congresswoman and cultural promoter.
- 10 August: Ramón Vásquez Brito (b. 1927) — painter.
- 3 September: Virgilio Trómpiz (b. 1927) — painter.
- 29 September:
  - Antonio Valero — Justice First leader killed at a campaign rally in Barinitas.
  - Omar Fernández — Democratic Action leader killed in the same event.
- 21 October: Rodolfo Santana (b. 1944) — playwright and theater director.
- 25 December: Augusto Bracca (b. 1918) — musician, composer and popular culturist.

== See also ==
- History of Venezuela
