= 2014 in Venezuela =

- Centuries: 19th; 20th; 21st
- Decades: 1990s; 2000s; 2010s; 2020s
- See also: Other events of 2014; Years in Venezuela; Timeline of Venezuelan history

The following lists events that happened during 2014 in Venezuela.

== Incumbents ==
- President: Nicolás Maduro
- Vice President: Jorge Arreaza

=== Governors ===
- Amazonas: Liborio Guarulla
- Anzoátegui: Aristóbulo Istúriz
- Apure: Ramón Carrizales
- Aragua: Tareck El Aissami
- Barinas: Adán Chávez
- Bolívar: Francisco Rangel Gómez
- Carabobo: Francisco Ameliach
- Cojedes: Erika Farías
- Delta Amacuro: Lizeta Hernández
- Falcón: Stella Lugo
- Guárico: Ramón Rodríguez Chacín
- Lara: Henri Falcón
- Mérida: Alexis Ramirez
- Miranda: Henrique Capriles Radonski
- Monagas: Yelitza Santaella
- Nueva Esparta: Carlos Mata Figueroa
- Portuguesa: Wilmar Castro
- Sucre: Luis Acuña
- Táchira: José Vielma Mora
- Trujillo: Henry Rangel Silva
- Vargas: Jorge García Carneiro
- Yaracuy: Julio León Heredia
- Zulia: Francisco Arias Cárdenas

== Events ==
=== January ===
- January 6 - Venezuelan beauty queen Mónica Spear and her British ex-husband are murdered through a carjacking in Caracas.
- January 9 - Seven suspects are arrested in the deaths of Venezuelan actress and beauty star, Mónica Spear, and her ex-husband, whose 5-year-old daughter witnessed the roadside shooting and was also wounded.

=== February ===
- February 12 - Protesters march against the government in various cities across Venezuela with at least 2 people killed in the demonstrations.
- February 13 - Venezuelan President Nicolás Maduro arrests opposition activists in reaction to an "attempted coup" against his government.
- February 17 - Venezuela orders the expulsion of three United States consular officials amid rising tensions over anti-government protests after accusing the US of working with the opposition to undermine President Nicolás Maduro's government.
- February 21 - 22-year-old Venezuelan beauty queen Génesis Carmona is shot in the head and killed while participating in a student protest against Nicolás Maduro's socialist government.
- February 21 - Venezuelan President Nicolás Maduro threatens to expel CNN from the country, alleging that they are helping the opposition.
- February 22 - Tens of thousands of people gather in Caracas to protest against the government of Nicolás Maduro.

=== March ===
- March 1 - Clashes continue between anti-government protesters and security forces after 41 people are arrested.
- March 6 - The government of Venezuela cuts diplomatic ties with Panama calling it a "lackey of the United States".

=== April ===
- April 29 - Venezuelan officials announce that a former chief of the Bolivarian Intelligence Service, Eliecer Otaiza, was shot and killed on Saturday.

=== September ===
- September 24 - Venezuela's opposition parties named Jesus Torrealba, a 56-year-old journalist and teacher, to head their coalition ahead of 2015 parliamentary elections where they hope to weaken President Maduro's socialist government.

=== October ===
- October 1 — Pro-government legislator Robert Serra was murdered.
