= List of governors in Venezuela =

Map of Venezuela where red denotes states governed by the United Socialist Party of Venezuela. Blue denotes those won by the Coalition for Democratic Unity after 2017 election.

Governors in Venezuela are in charge of the government and administration of each state. A governor must be a Venezuelan over the age of 25 who is not a member of the clergy. The governor can be elected for a term of four years by a majority vote. The governor can be re-elected to an additional term only immediately and only once.

Governors give a yearly public accounting to the State Comptroller for their office, and submit a report on the same to the Legislative Council and the Public Policy Planning and Coordination Council.

In each state exists a Public Policy Planning and Coordination Council, chaired by the governor with members from the mayors, the state directors of the various ministries and representatives of the legislators elected by the State to the National Assembly, as well as representatives from the Legislative Council, the municipal councils and organized communities, including native communities where they exist.

== List by state ==
State	Executive	Office holder	Party	Last election	Next election	Map
Amazonas	Governor of Amazonas	Miguel Leonardo Rodríguez	United Socialist Party of Venezuela	2021	2025	
Anzoategui	Governor of Anzoátegui	Luis José Marcano	United Socialist Party of Venezuela	2021	2025	
Apure	Governor of Apure	Eduardo Piñate	United Socialist Party of Venezuela	2021	2025	
Aragua	Governor of Aragua	Karina Carpio Bejarano	United Socialist Party of Venezuela	2021	2025	
Barinas	Governor of Barinas	Sergio Garrido	Democratic Action	2021	2025	
Bolivar	Governor of Bolívar	Ángel Bautista Marcano	United Socialist Party of Venezuela	2021	2025	
Carabobo	Governor of Carabobo	Rafael Lacava	United Socialist Party of Venezuela	2021	2025	
Cojedes	Governor of Cojedes	José Alberto Galindez	Justice First	2021	2025	
Delta Amacuro	Governor of Delta Amacuro	Lizeta Hernández Abchi	United Socialist Party of Venezuela	2021	2025	
Falcon	Governor of Falcón	Víctor José Clark	United Socialist Party of Venezuela	2021	2025	
Guarico	Governor of Guárico	José Manuel Vásquez	United Socialist Party of Venezuela	2021	2025	
Lara	Governor of Lara	Adolfo Pereira Antique	United Socialist Party of Venezuela	2021	2025	
Mérida	Governor of Mérida	Yeisón Guzmán	United Socialist Party of Venezuela	2021	2025	
Miranda	Governor of Miranda	Héctor Rodríguez	United Socialist Party of Venezuela	2021	2025	
Monagas	Governor of Monagas	Ernesto Luna	United Socialist Party of Venezuela	2021	2025	
Nueva Esparta	Governor of Nueva Esparta	Morel Rodríguez	Neighborhood Force	2021	2025	
Portuguesa	Governor of Portuguesa	Antonio Cedeño	United Socialist Party of Venezuela	2021	2025	
Sucre	Governor of Sucre	Gilberto Pinto	United Socialist Party of Venezuela	2021	2025	
Tachira	Governor of Táchira	Freddy Bernal	United Socialist Party of Venezuela	2021	2025	
Trujillo	Governor of Trujillo	Gerardo Márquez	United Socialist Party of Venezuela	2021	2025	
Vargas	Governor of Vargas	José Alejandro Terán	United Socialist Party of Venezuela	2021	2025	
Yaracuy	Governor of Yaracuy	Leonardo Intoci	United Socialist Party of Venezuela	2021	2025	
Zulia	Governor of Zulia	Luis Caldera	United Socialist Party of Venezuela	2025	2029	
Distrito Capital	Head of the Government	Nahum Fernández	United Socialist Party of Venezuela	By appointment		
Territorio Insular Miranda	Head of the Government	Eladio Jimémez Rattia	United Socialist Party of Venezuela	By appointment		

== Other authorities ==
=== Mayors of Metropolitan District of Caracas ===
The Metropolitan District was created in 1999 and abolished in 2017. See also List of governors of Federal District of Venezuela.

Took office	Left office	Mayor	Vote
2000	2004	Alfredo Peña, MVR	64.80
2004	2008	Juan Barreto, MVR	60.33
2008	2015	Antonio Ledezma, ABP	52.42
2015	2017	Helen Fernández, ABP	Replacement after Ledezma was arrested.
2017	2017	Alí Mansour Landaeta, PJ	Last mayor

=== Heads of Government of the Distrito Capital ===
The head of government of the Capital District was created in 2009. The head is appointed by the president of Venezuela.

Took office	Left office	Head
14 April 2009	13 October 2014	Jacqueline Faría, PSUV
13 October 2014	26 May 2015	Ernesto Villegas, PSUV
26 May 2015	6 January 2016	Juan Carlos Dugarte, PSUV
6 January 2016	29 January 2017	Daniel Aponte, PSUV
29 January 2017	21 June 2017	Carolina Cestari, PSUV
21 June 2017	5 January 2018	Antonio Benavides Torres, PSUV
5 January 2018	29 January 2020	Carolina Cestari, PSUV
29 January 2020	13 August 2020	Darío Vivas, PSUV
