= 2011 in Venezuela =

- Centuries: 19th; 20th; 21st
- Decades: 1990s; 2000s; 2010s; 2020s
- See also: Other events of 2011; Years in Venezuela; Timeline of Venezuelan history

The following lists events that happened during 2011 in Venezuela.

== Deaths ==
- 13 April: Francisco Vera Izquierdo (n. 1919) — university professor, cultural promoter.
- 22 April: Sofía Silva Inserri (n. 1929) — first Miss Venezuela in 1952.
- 17 May: Wilfred Iván Ojeda (n. 1955) — baseball player.
- 16 June: José Bracho (n. 1928) — baseball player.
- 17 June: Héctor Benítez (n. 1918) — baseball player.
- 19 June: Sebastián Viale Rigo (n. 1933) — academic, professor, researcher, and veterinarian.
- 3 August: Argenis Tortolero (n. 1941) — soccer player.
- 18 December: José Agustín Catalá (n. 1915) — journalist and writer.
- Óscar Sambrano Urdaneta, writer.

== See also ==
- History of Venezuela
