= Asdrúbal Chávez =

Venezuelan chemical engineer and politician (born 1954)

President of Citgo
- In office 22 November 2017 – 12 February 2019
- Preceded by: José Pereira
- Succeeded by: Carlos E. Jordá

Deputy to the National Assembly of Venezuela
- In office 5 January 2016 – 1 June 2017

Minister of the Popular Power of Oil and Mining
- In office 3 September 2014 – 5 January 2016
- Preceded by: Rafael Ramírez
- Succeeded by: Eulogio Del Pino

Personal details
- Born: May 18, 1954 (age 72) Santa Rita, Maracay, Venezuela
- Party: United Socialist Party of Venezuela
- Education: University of the Andes

Asdrúbal José Chávez (born May 18, 1954) is a Venezuelan politician.

== Career ==
He served as president of Citgo, a subsidiary of Venezuela's state oil company PDVSA.

He also served as deputy to the National Assembly of Venezuela and Minister of Petroleum and Mining. He is the cousin of the late president of Venezuela, Hugo Chávez.

In April 2020, he was appointed by Nicolás Maduro to run oil company Petróleos de Venezuela, S.A. (PDVSA).
