= Legislative Council of Zulia =

- Consejo Legislativo del Zulia
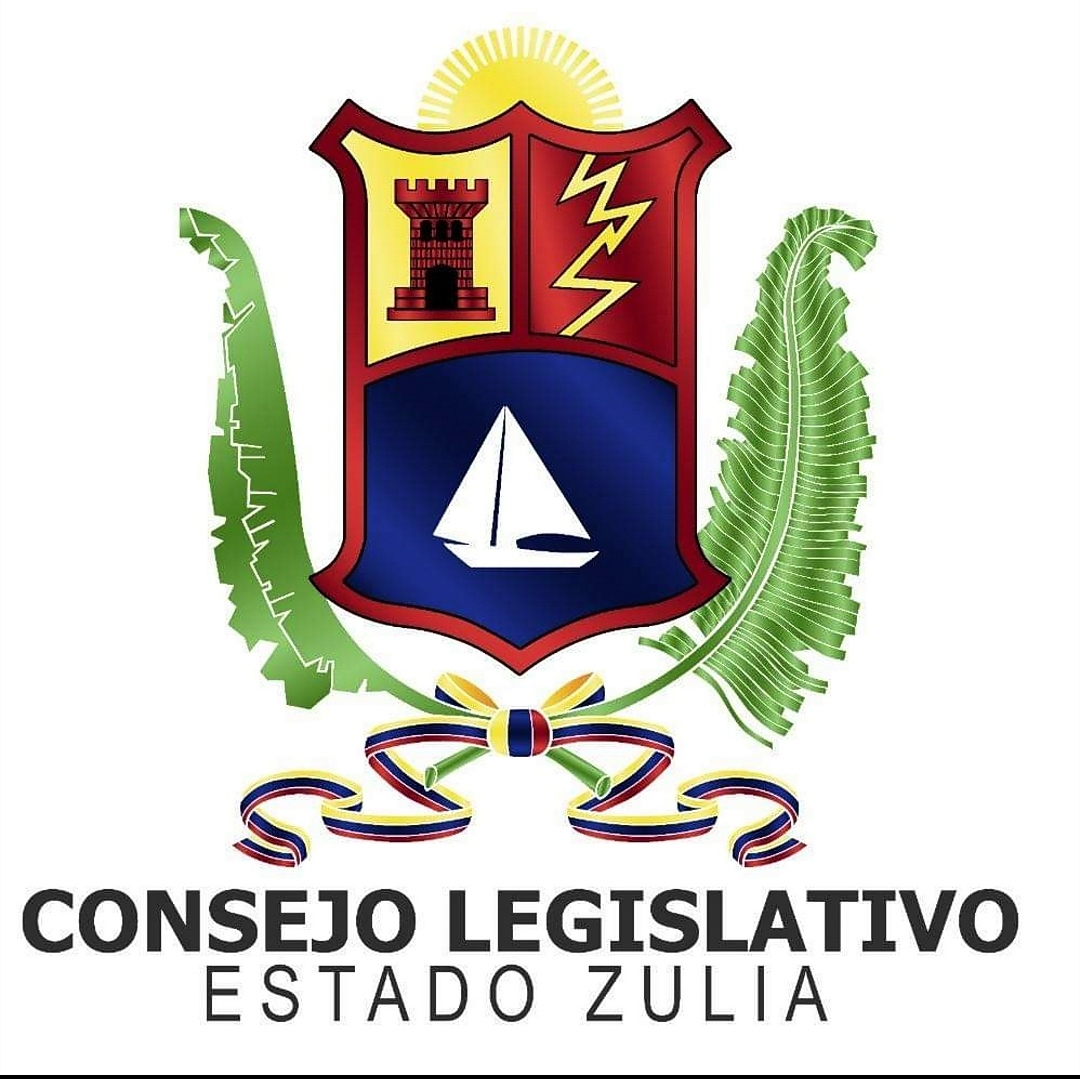

Type
- Type: Unicameral

Leadership
- President: Magdely Valbuena
- Vice President: Glenis Semprún

Structure
- Seats: 15
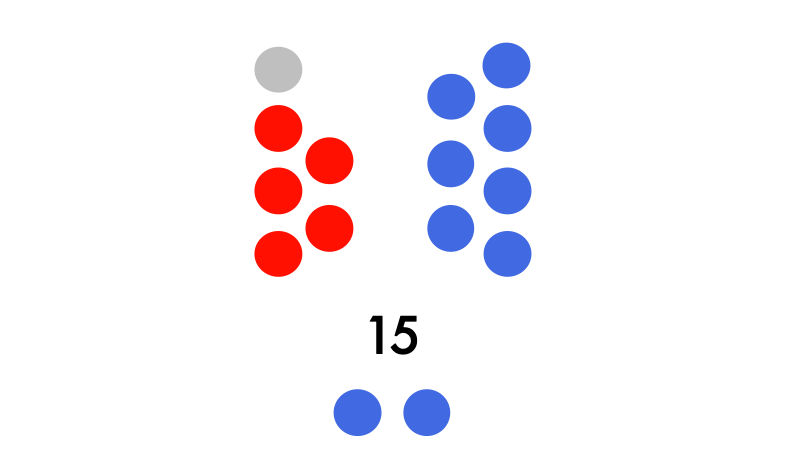
- Political groups: Governing parties: A New Era (9); Opposition parties: PSUV (5); Indigenous Representation (1)
- Length of term: 4 years
- Authority: Article 4, Constitution of Zulia

Elections
- Last election: 25 May 2025

Meeting place
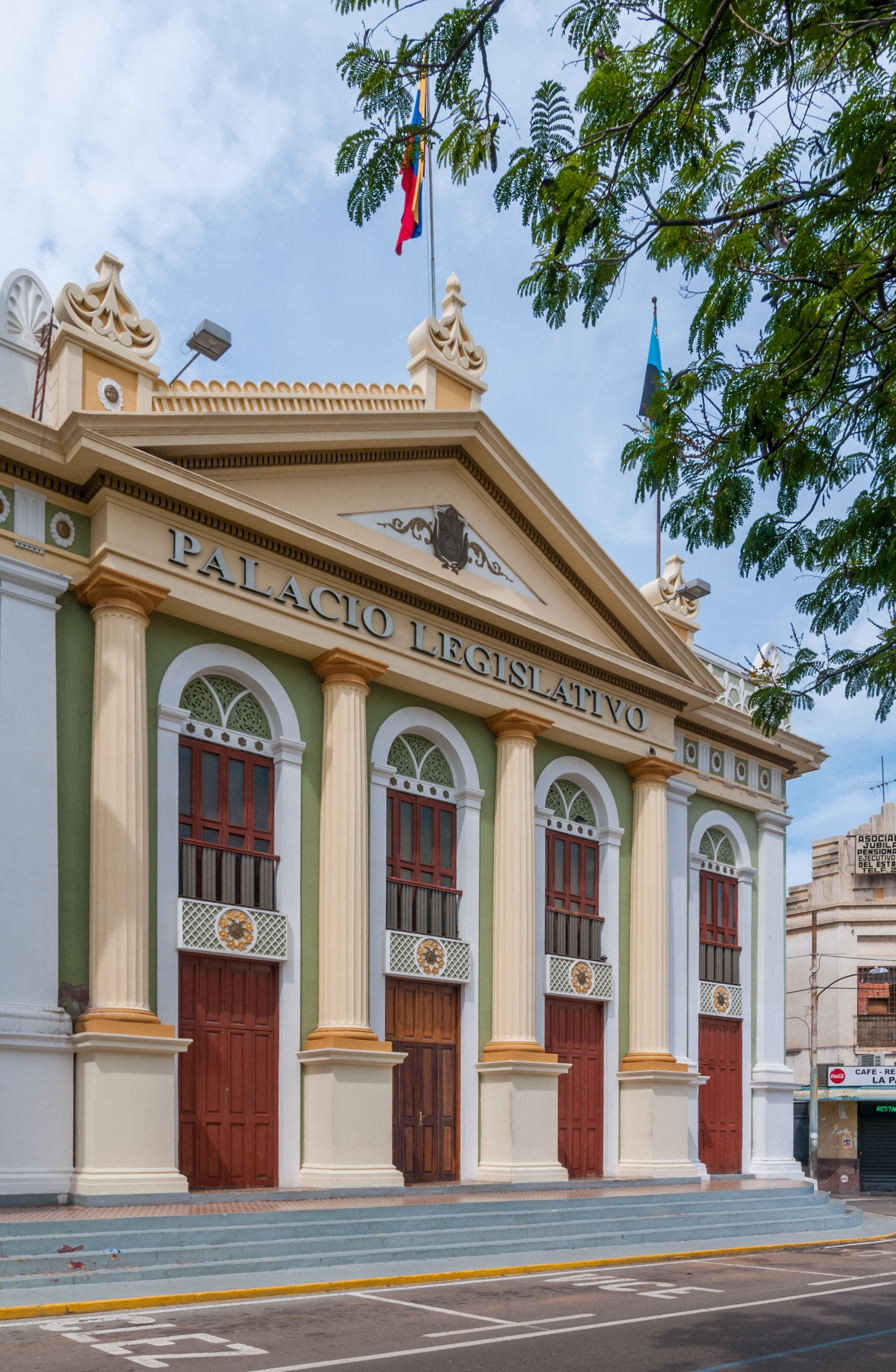
- Palacio Legislativo; Maracaibo, Zulia

Website
- Consejo Legislativo del Zulia

The Legislative Council of Zulia (Spanish: Consejo Legislativo del Estado Zulia, CLEZ), according to article 162 of the Constitution of Venezuela and article 38 of the Constitution of Zulia, is the state legislature of Zulia, a state of Venezuela. It consists of 15 deputies who are popularly elected from state legislatorial districts.

== 5th Legislature (2018-2021) ==
- Ángel Sánchez (A New Era)
- Javier Muñóz (A New Era)
- Manuel Peña (A New Era)
- Marlene Antúnez (A New Era)
- Ángel Monagas (A New Era)
- Eliseo Fermín (A New Era)
- William Sandrea A New Era
- Orlando Simancas (A New Era)
- Juan Carlos Velazco (Democratic Action)
- Adaulfo Carrasquero (Radical Cause)
- Egdar Oberto (For Social Democracy)
- Arnoldo Olivares (PSUV)
- Betty de Zuleta (PSUV)
- José Luis Acosta (PSUV)
- Javier Armato (Movimiento Indígena)
