= Rito Jiménez =

Venezuelan politician (1951–2021)

Rito Jiménez (1951 – 20 March 2021) was a Venezuelan politician.

He contested the 2020 Venezuelan parliamentary election on behalf of the United Socialist Party of Venezuela, and was elected to the National Assembly as a legislator representing Lara. He died in office on 20 March 2021, aged 70, of COVID-19.
