= State protector =

The state protectors, also known as regional protectors, are an extrajudicial figure created during the Bolivarian Revolution. They consist of parallel positions to Venezuela's state governors appointed by the governing party (the United Socialist Party of Venezuela, PSUV) in regions with opposition political party leaders. The figure does not appear in the Venezuelan Constitution or in any other legal regulation of the country, and the protectors usurp the function of receiving and directly administering the resources of the regional governments.

== Definition ==
State protectors are ad hoc figures that assume the functions of elected governors in the regions. The figure does not exist in the Venezuelan Constitution or in any other of the legal norms that regulate the political-territorial structure of the country, such as the Organic Law of Public Administration or the Organic Law of Decentralization, Delimitation and Transfer of Powers of the Public Power. The protectors usurp the function of receiving and directly administering the resources of the regional governments for the execution of public works through ministries and state entities destined for the social attention of the regions.

== Background ==
On 3 July 2009, the Mayor of the Metropolitan District of Caracas, Antonio Ledezma, went to the offices of the Organization of American States (OAS) in Caracas and declared the beginning of a hunger strike in rejection of the Hugo Chávez government's disavowal of him as Mayor of Caracas. According to Ledezma, the strike was a success since the government and the OAS gave in to his demands. The day before, in the evening hours, the Sole Authority of the Capital District, a new entity created by decree of President Hugo Chávez, which assumed powers taken away from Ledezma in the context of a reform, announced the transfer to the mayor's office of a "financial aid" of 52,000 bolivars (approximately US$24,186) so that the Metropolitan Mayor's Office, whose headquarters in Caracas also passed from Ledezma's hands to the newly created government of the Capital District, "may proceed to cancel, strictly" the payrolls for June and July, said a statement. On the other hand, it was also announced that the Secretary General of the OAS, José Miguel Insulza, has promised to receive a commission of governors and parliamentarians in Washington, D.C., and that he would meet with a group of governors and parliamentarians from the OAS.

== History ==
In 2012, the then opposition governor of Miranda state, Henrique Capriles, denounced this type of appointments when Nicolás Maduro created CorpoMiranda, an entity with regional public administration functions in which Elías Jaua, then foreign affairs minister and defeated when he was candidate for governor of Miranda in the regional elections of that year, had been appointed as director.

After the 2017 regional elections, Maduro appointed "protectors" for several states where the opposition had won, assuring that he was appointing them "so as not to leave the people in the lurch". Maduro promised to eliminate the position of protectors after the 2021 regional elections.

== Appointments ==
Some of the designated state protectors have been as follows:

Protector	State	Appointment	Ref
Aristóbulo Istúriz	Anzoátegui	2020	
Luis José Marcano	Anzoátegui	2021	
Jehyson Guzmán	Mérida	2017	
Dante Rivas	Nueva Esparta	2018	
Freddy Bernal	Táchira	2018	

== See also ==
- Deep state
