= Bolivia Suárez =

Venezuelan politician (1957–2020)

Bolivia Suárez (3 June 1957 – 17 December 2020) was a Venezuelan politician who was a member of A New Era.

== Biography ==
She served as Deputy for Lara in the National Assembly of Venezuela from 2016 until her death in office in 2020.

Suárez died on 17 December 2020, at age 63, from COVID-19 during the COVID-19 pandemic in Venezuela.
