= Esther Alzaibar =

Puerto Rican artist (1930–2022)

Esther Alzaibar (28 August 1930 – 26 January 2022) was a Puerto Rican and Venezuelan ceramic artist. She was a ceramics professor in Caracas-Venezuela at the Institute Neumann from 1972 to 1976 and also taught at the School of Cristobal Rojas from 1974 to 1976. She is seen as a pioneer for the art of ceramics, by being one of the founders of the Venezuelan Association of the Arts of Fire (Fuego) and for the significant pieces that are a part of the heritage of the Museum of Contemporary Art of Caracas.

Alzaibar founded an institution for teaching ceramics: the Ceramic School Workshop in 1973 and worked for 37 years. Alzaibar first began doing ceramics when she divorced her husband with four children. One of Alzaibar's friends recommended ceramics as a therapeutic method to alleviate her devastation from the divorce.

She died on 26 January 2022, at the age of 91.

== Notable exhibitions ==
In 1974, she participated in the exhibition "Ceramistas de Venezuela."

In 1975, "Handcrafted and industrial women" (Palacio de las Industrias, Caracas) featured a selection of her work. In 1977, she participated in the collective "Ceramic Workshop" at the MACC. In 1985, she exhibited with Renate Pozo and participated in the VI and VII National Hall of Fire Arts (Valencia, Edo. Carabobo, 1978 and 1979) and in the XII and XIII Fire Arts Exhibition in the Sala Mendoza (1979 and 1980).

== Works ==
Alzaibar initially worked on closed forms of oval and cylindrical shape ceramics, which often turned into bowls and vessels. However, as she got deeper into her career, she began to create murals with carved clay.
