= El desertor =

2015 Venezuelan film

- Film poster
- Directed by: Raúl Chamorro
- Written by: Raúl Chamorro
- Produced by: 9 y 1/2 Comunicaciones
- Starring: Magdiel González; Eliane Chipia; Leónidas Urbina; Glenda Mendoza; Mercedes López; Salvador Villegas
- Cinematography: Gerard Uzcátegui
- Music by: Álvaro Cordero
- Release date: March 27, 2015 (Venezuela)
- Running time: 93 minutes
- Country: Venezuela
- Language: Spanish

El desertor (lit. 'The deserter') is a 2015 Venezuelan romantic drama film directed by Raúl Chamorro. The film focuses on a conscript that decides to desert from the army.

== Plot ==
Set in the Andes region of Venezuela in the 1960s and 1970s, a young peasant, Julian, is forcibly recruited into the army, where he suffers mistreatment and abuse and takes the decision to desert.

== Production ==
Before the filming started, the script represented Venezuela in 2012 in a screenwriting workshop that was part of the Havana Film Festival.

The filming took place in the town of Jajó, Trujillo state, in the Urdaneta municipality. Over 300 residents were selected to participate as extras in the movie, and the residents provided most of the props used in the production. The cast was entirely made up of actors from the Andes.

== Release ==
At its release, the film was screened in at least forty cinemas across different cities in Venezuela. It participated in the Venezuelan Film Festival in Mérida state in 2016, as well as the International Festival of Culture in Boyacá, Colombia, in 2019.
