= 2025 Venezuelan regional elections =

Local elections in Venezuela

- 25 May 2025

24 governorships 260 state legislators
- Registered: 21,507,162
- Turnout: 42.63% (▲0.37pp) CNE; 12.56% (▼29.70pp) ConVzla
Alliance	GPPSB	AD
Popular vote	4,553,484	449,494
Percentage	82.60%	6.25%
Swing	▲42.38pp	▼8.16pp
Governors	23	1
Governors +/–	▲4	Steady
- Results by state.

Regional elections were held in Venezuela on 25 May 2025 to elect the governors of the country's 24 claimed states (Note: Also included is the governor of the disputed state of Guayana Esequiba.) and members of their respective state legislative councils. The elections were held concurrently with the parliamentary election, in which members of the National Assembly for the 2026–2031 term were chosen.

The elections took place against a backdrop of political crisis, following the disputed 2024 presidential election—an event that sparked protests against the results announced by the National Electoral Council (CNE). Tensions continued into early January 2025, with demonstrations opposing the inauguration of Nicolás Maduro and protesting the CNE’s lack of transparency in releasing the full election results—a concern echoed by international observers—alongside the initiation of UN investigations into electoral fraud.

In the days leading up to the elections, the Venezuelan government carried out a wave of arrests, detaining more than 70 individuals—including politicians, activists, journalists, and lawyers—on accusations of involvement in conspiracies. The electoral process was marked by low nationwide turnout and a heavy presence of state security forces. While the CNE claimed a turnout of 42.63%, the opposition’s Comando con Venezuela stated that turnout was only 12.56%.

Furthermore, irregularities arose during the announcement of the results, as the reported turnout percentage did not align with the number of voters indicated in the initial electoral bulletin.

== Background ==
On 28 July 2024, presidential elections were held, in which the National Electoral Council proclaimed Nicolás Maduro president-elect with 51.95% of the vote. The elections were deemed neither free nor fair, as they took place in a context where the government controlled all branches of the State while repressing the political opposition.

For its part, the opposition rejected these figures, asserting that Edmundo González had won with 67.05% of the vote, based on the electoral records (tally sheets) in their possession. Candidates Enrique Márquez, Claudio Fermín, and Antonio Ecarri also demanded the publication of the official vote tally sheets. Several countries expressed their rejection of the results, pointed to irregularities, and called for the publication of the vote tally sheets.

=== Call for Elections ===
On November 9, 2024, President Nicolás Maduro raised the possibility of holding regional elections in separate stages—first for mayors, then for governors, and subsequently for the Parliament. "It would seem that the best approach would be to hold separate elections: first mayors, then governors, and then the Parliament—though that is just my opinion; it is one perspective among many in the debate," he stated.

On January 15, 2025, the National Assembly began organizing a working group involving various sectors, including a minority opposition aligned with the ruling party (consisting largely of political parties that have been subject to judicial intervention). Notably absent from these consultative meetings were the major opposition factions, which are organized under the Unitary Platform. Despite this absence, the ruling party continued discussions to develop proposals and potential dates, which were to be submitted to the CNE to establish an electoral calendar for the upcoming regional and parliamentary elections.

=== Electoral Abstention ===
On January 19, 2025, María Corina Machado, the opposition leader from the Unitary Platform, issued a message via social media calling for a boycott of the elections. She stated: "The elections took place on July 28 (2024). That day, the people made their choice... The result must be—and will be—respected. Until that result takes effect, participating in any kind of election is inappropriate. Going to vote time and again without the results being respected is not defending the vote; it is undermining the popular will."

The Communist Party of Venezuela, in a press release summarizing the conclusions of its Central Committee’s 15th Plenary Session, declared that it would not participate in the parliamentary or regional elections, citing a lack of electoral guarantees.

Popular Will announced that any party members who chose to participate in the elections would be expelled, and reiterated that the party itself would not take part.

On February 25, Justice First announced that it would not participate in the legislative and regional elections scheduled for May 25. The party committee—with 108 out of 126 members in favor—voted to reaffirm its commitment to defending the results of the July 28 election. This decision faced criticism from certain leaders and regional spokespersons who argued in favor of participating in the vote, while also advocating for "freedom of conscience" among the party’s rank and file. This has triggered an internal crisis within the party ahead of the elections.

=== Fragmentation within the Unitary Platform ===
The Unitary Platform, the main opposition coalition, has faced internal crises and divisions since the announcement of the controversial regional and parliamentary elections. Notably, Omar Barboza, of the Un Nuevo Tiempo party, resigned from his position as executive secretary in early March; among the reasons he cited for his departure were a lack of "unity" and "leaks" that undermine honest discussion.

Other leaders, such as Andrés Velázquez of Radical Cause, argued that "organizations that adopted a policy contrary to the majority's decision cannot remain part of the coalition," suggesting that political groups like Un Nuevo Tiempo and Movimiento por Venezuela (Movement for Venezuela) should be excluded from the Unitary Platform.

==== Internal divisions ====
Following a call for abstention issued under the opposition’s unified strategy, the Justice Firstparty became embroiled in an internal political conflict. Several regional presidents, spokespersons, and party members rejected the call, asserting that the decision "was neither debated nor agreed upon through the appropriate channels."

These events triggered a wave of internal accusations among various leaders, ultimately leading to the expulsion of six party members: Henrique Capriles, Tomás Guanipa, Amelia Belisario, Ángel Medina, Pablo Pérez, and Juan Requesens.

=== PSUV Primaries ===
On March 15, grassroots assemblies were held to nominate candidates for state governorships and legislative councils, as well as for legislative seats in the elections scheduled for May 25. In a press conference, PSUV Secretary-General Diosdado Cabello asserted that these elections are democratic and legitimate.

On March 16, during a press conference, PSUV Secretary-General Diosdado Cabello provided an overview of the proceedings, noting that the grassroots assemblies yielded a total of 163,015 nominations, involving 131,902 individual nominees. "We had 163,015 nominations for 131,902 nominees—that is, unique individuals. Why the difference? Because 31,113 people were nominated for more than one position," he explained.

There were 21,648 nominations for the positions of state governor, approximately 66,731 for the National Assembly, and about 74,636 for state legislative councils. He further announced the commencement of a selection process for candidates who meet the requirements for registration with the National Electoral Council.

== Conduct ==
The president of the National Electoral Council, Elvis Amoroso, announced that legislative and regional elections would be held on Sunday, April 27, and indicated that the electoral schedule would be released in the coming hours. Subsequently, on February 19, Amoroso announced that the election date had been moved to May 25, stating that this change was in response to a request from "various political actors" who intended to participate in the elections.

These elections were been marked by irregularities, most notably frequent changes to the electoral schedule. Furthermore, the official call for elections lacked legal standing, as the electoral body failed to publish a detailed schedule in the Official Gazette. The official website—a critical component for the operation of the Automated Candidate Nomination System—has remained inactive. Other issues, such as the definition of electoral districts (particularly regarding the Guayana Esequiba region), have created an environment of opacity and secrecy surrounding the entire process.

On April 3, in an interview with the television network Globovisión, CNE rector Conrado Pérez Briceño claimed that the alleged "hacking" of the electoral body's website had been resolved. He stated, "It is practically resolved, and political organizations will receive a link to nominate candidates for governorships, legislative councils, and the National Assembly." However, two weeks later, the website remains inactive.

The elections were characterized by low turnout nationwide, marked by a striking contrast as, while state security forces were present, polling stations remained empty, and poll watchers from the various political parties were notably absent. With deserted streets and empty polling stations, this was not a case of electoral apathy; rather, it was the Venezuelan people responding to a call for abstention issued a week earlier by their leader, María Corina Machado—a call to refrain from voting until the results of the presidential election held on July 28 are officially recognized. The National Electoral Council claimed a turnout of 42.63%, whereas the opposition’s Comando con Venezuela stated that turnout was only 12.56%. In an exit poll, the polling firm Meganálisis estimated that only 13.59% of the electorate participated—meaning that out of 21.4 million eligible voters, approximately 2,919,000 cast a ballot.

== See also ==
- State protector
