= Anselmo López (musician) =

Venezuelan musician (1934–2016)

- Born: April 21, 1934; Chaparrito, Barinas, Venezuela
- Died: February 14, 2016 (aged 81); Barinas, Barinas, Venezuela

Anselmo López (April 21, 1934 – February 14, 2016) was one of the most important bandola llanera players in Venezuela. He is the creator of the Jalao (Spanish for "pull") technique, which applies a technique derived from the classical guitar to the bandola llanera. In the jalao, the thumb and index fingers hold the plectrum to pick the melody, while the nail of the index or middle finger, or sometimes the plectrum itself, is used to pluck harmonic notes in the chord of the melody on the adjacent strings. With this technique, Anselmo López popularized the bandola nationally and internationally. He recorded several albums.

Anselmo López, who also goes by the name of “el Rey de la Bandola” (The King of the Bandolas), breathed new life into the Bandola with his playing style. He was the inventor of the “segundeo” technique, a special technique only applied only to the Bandola Llanera.

La Escuela Anselmera (the Anselmo School) is now considered as a typical traditional style of Bandola playing.

== Discography ==
- 1968 Viajando al Llano
- 1970 Raudales de mi Región
- 1972 Bandola Quitapesares
- 1973 Bandola Internacional
- 1974 Arpa y Bandola
- 1975 Cimarrón
- 1976 Esta es mi Bandola
- 1976 Bandola del Llano Adentro
- 1977 Lluvia en el Llano
- 1980 Folklore Puro
- 1981 Bandola de Chaparrito
- 1982 El Rebusco con Bandola
- 1982 Anselmo López Vol. 1
- 1982 Anselmo López Vol. 2
- 1982 La Cruz de Mayo
- 1982 Instrumentales Criollos
- 1983 Recio
- 1997 Clásicos de Oro
- 1999 16 Grandes e Inolvidables de Anselmo López Vol. 2
- 1999 La Mejor Bandola
- 2007 El Rey de la Bandola

== See also ==
- Venezuelan music
