= Gladys Guarisma =

Venezuelan linguist (1938–2022)

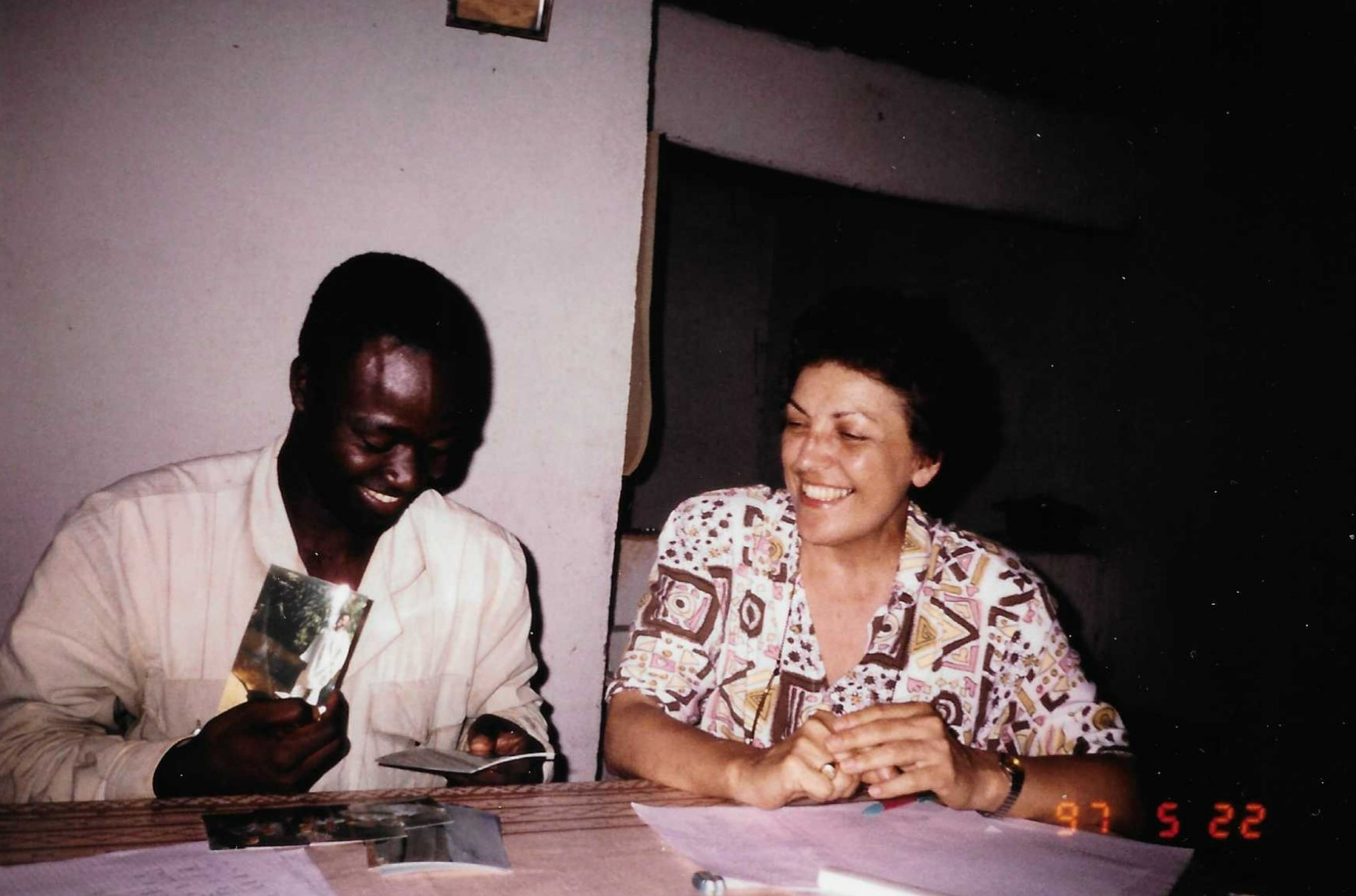
- Guarisma (right) in 1997
- Born: 30 August 1938; Ciudad Bolívar, Venezuela
- Died: 12 February 2022 (aged 83)
- Occupation: Linguist

Gladys Guarisma (30 August 1938 – 12 February 2022) was a Venezuelan linguist. She worked at the French National Centre for Scientific Research (CNRS) and was one of the pioneers of African linguistics.

== Biography ==
Guarisma joined the CNRS and was recruited by Jacqueline M.C. Thomas to join her research team, which later became known as LACITO. She was known as a specialist of Bantu languages in Cameroon, such as the Bafia language, of which she published a phonology in 1967. In 1992, she published a thesis titled Le bafia (rì-kpāɂ). She also studied the Vute language, on which she published a study in 1978. After her retirement, she continued her scientific activities for many years.

Guarisma died on 12 February 2022, at the age of 83.

== Publications ==
- Dialectométrie lexicale de quelques parlers bantous de la zone A, in: La méthode dialectométrique appliquée aux langues africaines (1986)
- La Méthode dialectométrique appliquée aux langues africaines (1986)
- Le Bafia (r-kpâɂ) (1992)
- Complexité morphologique, simplicité syntaxique : le cas du bafia, langue bantoue (A 50) du Cameroun (2000)
