= Pastor Heydra =

Venezuelan journalist (1948–2021)

Pastor Antonio Heydra Rojas (4 July 1948 – 2 February 2021) was a Venezuelan journalist, columnist and politician. He served as the Minister of Information during the administration of former Venezuelan President Carlos Andrés Pérez. Heydra was also a member of both the now-defunct Venezuelan Chamber of Deputies and its successor, the National Assembly. Professionally, was a longtime columnist and journalist for the Costa de Sol FM 93.1 radio station.

== Life and career ==
Heydra was born on 4 July 1948, in La Guaira, Vargas state, Venezuela. He was the oldest of four brothers. His father, Pastor Heydra de Barlovento, was originally from Miranda state, while his mother, Iris Rojas, an academic, was from the city of Juan Griego on Margarita Island. The family moved to Margarita Island a few days after his birth. Heydra was raised by his maternal grandmother while his mother completed her university degrees in Caracas.

Heydra earned his bachelor's degree in engineering from Central University of Venezuela.

In 1968, Heydra and Rosmary Morales had one daughter, Katiuska Heydra Morales, his first child. In 1978, he had a second child, Carlos Julio Heydra Castillo, with Aura Martha Castillo Sagarzazu. In 1999, Heydra married Adriana María Ramos, with whom he had one son, Pastor Antonio Heydra Ramos.

Following a COVID-19 diagnosis amid the COVID-19 pandemic in Venezuela, Heydra was hospitalized for several days in January and February 2021. He died of a stroke from COVID-19 complications at a hospital on Margarita Island, Nueva Esparta state, at 5:00 a.m. on 2 February 2021, aged 78. He was survived by his wife of 20 years, Adriana María Ramos, three children, and four grandchildren.
