= Rossana Ordóñez =

Venezuelan journalist (1951–2021)

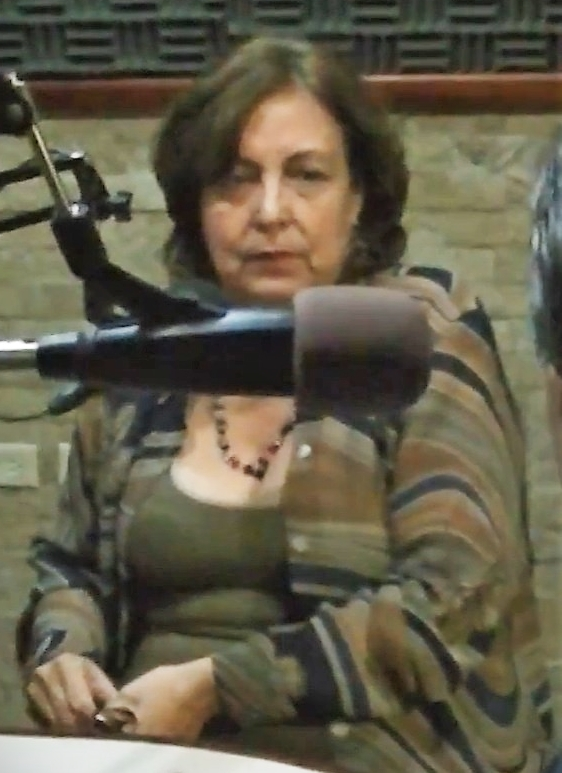
- Ordóñez in 2018
- Born: 12 February 1951; Lima, Peru
- Died: 1 August 2021 (aged 70); Caracas, Venezuela
- Spouse: Apolinar Martínez

Rossana Ordóñez (12 February 1951 – 1 August 2021) was a Venezuelan journalist. She worked at El Nacional and Radio Caracas Televisión (RCTV), Among other media outlets, and served both as secretary general of the National College of Journalists, Caracas branch, and of the Institute of Social Security for Journalists (IPSP in Spanish).

== Career ==
Ordoñez studied a Ph.D. in political science. She was a reporter for El Nacional; in the 1980s she worked on the television program "Lo de Hoy es Noticia" on Radio Caracas Televisión (RCTV), was a broadcaster for GRD New York, worked as an international editor and was a professor at Universidad Santa María, in Caracas. She edited the magazines Bohemia and Momento afterwards. She also served as secretary general of the National College of Journalists, Caracas chapter, and of the Institute of Social Security for Journalists (IPSP).

In 2021, the media and Rossana's colleagues began a campaign to raise funds to pay a treatment for pancreatic, renal and liver problems she was suffering. On 1 August 2021, the secretary of the National College of Journalists, Delvalle Canelón, confirmed Ordóñez's death.

She died of pancreatic cancer. She was seventy years old at the time of her death.
