= Legislative Council of Cojedes =

- Consejo Legislativo del Estado Bolivariano de Cojedes

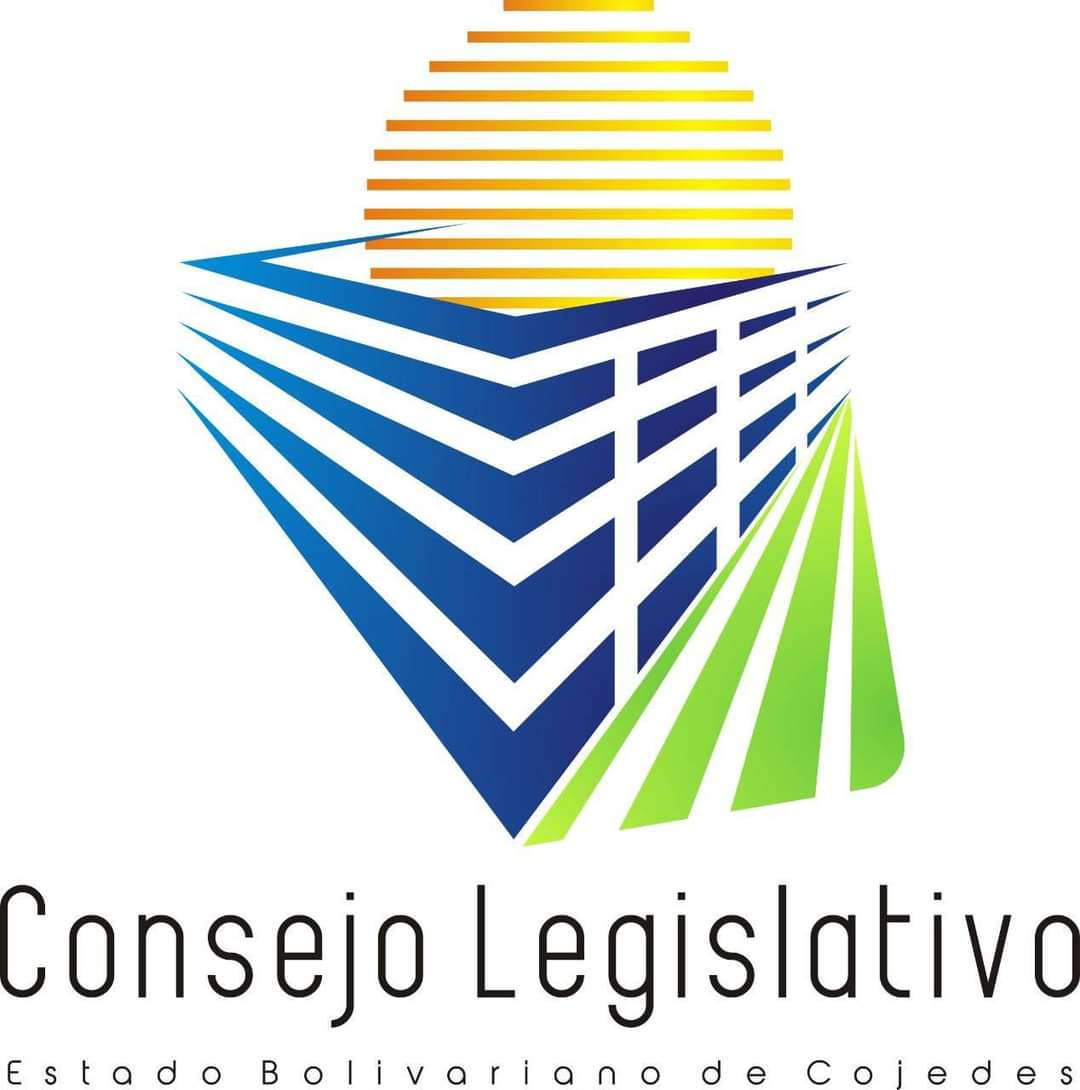

Type
- Type: Unicameral

Leadership
- President: Rafael Adonay, MUD since 5 January 2024
- Vice President: Luis Villanueva (UNT/MUD) since 5 January 2024

Structure
- Length of term: 4 years
- Authority: Article 4, Constitution of Cojedes

Meeting place
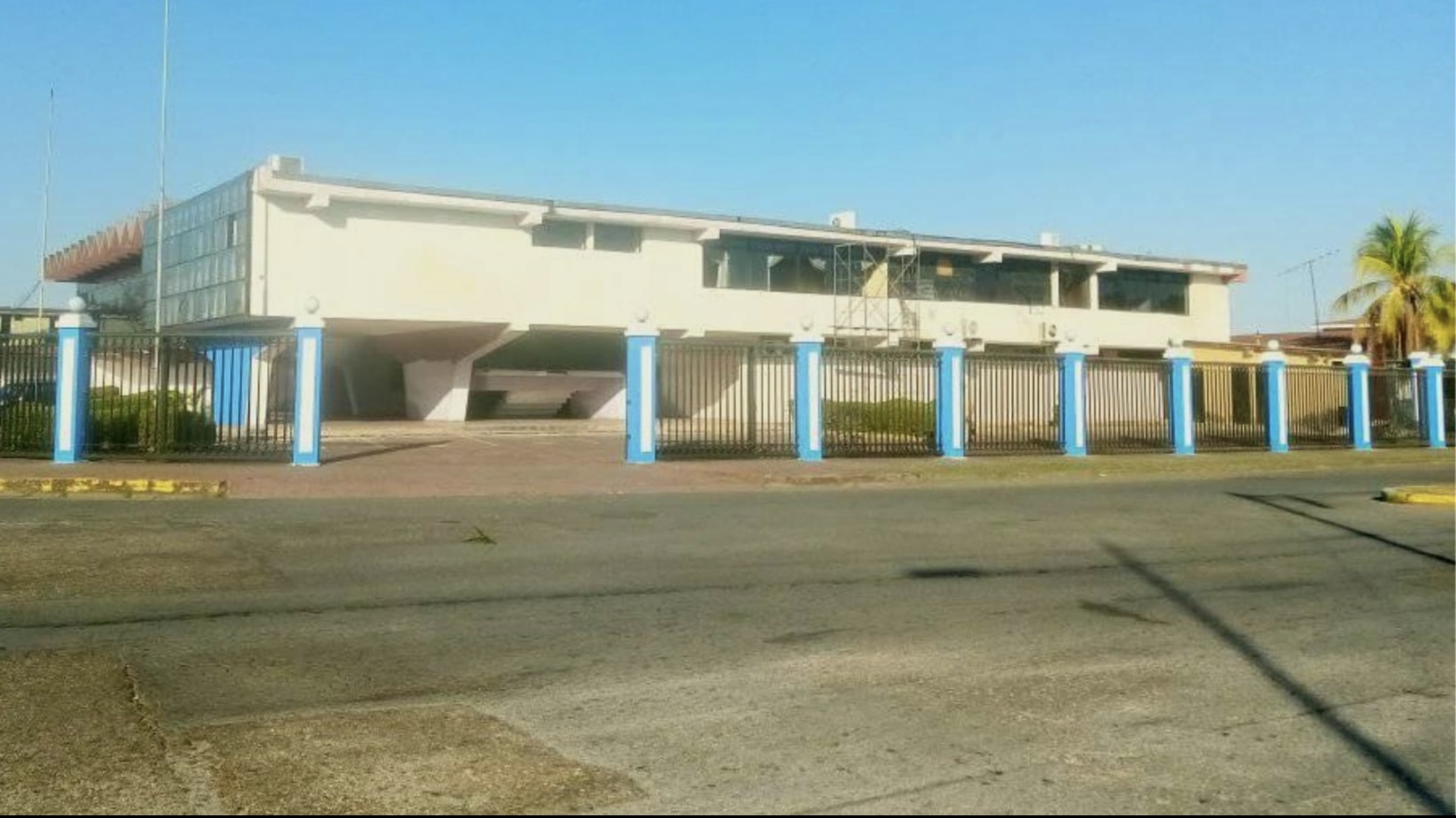

The Legislative Council of the Bolivarian State of Cojedes (CLEBC) represents the legislative power of that state in the western central part of Venezuela. It is a unicameral regional parliament. Its election is held every four years, and it can be re-elected. With the possibility of revoking his mandate halfway through the constitutional period.

The council is unicameral and is made up of seven regional deputies or legislators who are elected every four years, under a mixed system of representation. On the one hand, a group of deputies are elected by list under the D'Hont method at the state level. and on the other hand, nominal candidates are elected by direct vote by defined constituency, and may be re-elected for new consecutive periods, and with the possibility of being revoked halfway through their constitutional period.

== Function ==
The chamber elects from within itself, a board of directors made up of a president and a vice president, in addition, a secretary is elected from outside its midst. As in the National Assembly, the regional Parliament forms permanent work committees that are responsible for analyzing the different issues that the communities raise, monitoring the administration of the State with the help of the comptroller general of the state, as well as the discussion and approval of the budgets of the chamber and the executive branch.

The functions of the regional legislative councils of Venezuela are detailed in the Organic Law of the Legislative Councils of the States published in the Official Gazette of the Bolivarian Republic of Venezuela of September 13, 2001.

== Composition of the VI Legislature (2021-2025) ==
In the 2021 regional elections of Venezuela, after 21 years governed by Chavismo, the Democratic Unity Roundtable (opposition to Chavismo) reaches the State Governorship and the qualified majority of the legislative chamber with 5 deputies of the 7 seats available.

5 deputies (MUD)

- Rafael Adonay
- Luis Villanueva
- Jackson Páez
- Francisco Vera
- Yesy Martínez

2 deputies (PSUV)

- Patricia Mendoza
- Rafael Ordóñez

== V Legislature 2025-2029 ==
In the 2025 regional election boycotting by a opposition, opposition regionaly maintained 5 deputies.

== See also ==
- Cojedes (state)
