= 2021 Venezuelan regional elections =

Local elections in Venezuela

- 21 November 2021

23 governorships 335 mayors 253 state legislators 2,471 councillors
- Registered: 21,159,846
- Turnout: 42.26% (▼18.79pp)
Alliance	GPPSB	PUD	AD
Popular vote	3,595,490	2,255,740	1,288,279
Percentage	40.22%	25.23%	14.41%
Swing	▼12.47pp	▼19.92pp	New
Governors	19	3	1
Governors +/–	▲1	▼2	New
Mayors	212	61	39
- Red denotes states won by the Great Patriotic Pole. Blue denotes those won by the Unitary Platform and the Democratic Alliance.

Regional and municipal elections were held in Venezuela on 21 November 2021. In the elections, all executive and legislative positions of the 23 federal entities, as well as that of the 335 municipalities of the country, were renewed.

The pro-government majority National Assembly repealed the Law of Regularization of State and Municipal Powers which prevented regional and municipal elections taking place simultaneously, allowing to convene joint elections of governors and mayors the same year. Afterwards, new rectors of the National Electoral Council (CNE) were appointed, the majority of members being pro-government.

The census issued by the National Institute of Statistics and approved by the National Assembly, which influences the redesign of electoral districts, did not take into account the movements of millions of migrants leaving the country in recent years. The CNE ratified that the indigenous vote for the elections would be of second degree, meaning that, as in the 2020 parliamentary elections, the members of the indigenous communities will not be able to directly elect the candidate of their choice, but must choose a delegate through "popular assemblies", which would be the ones to cast the vote.

On 8 August, the United Socialist Party of Venezuela (PSUV) held primary elections to choose its candidates for the elections, during whose campaign important divisions and internal differences were evident in the ruling party, and politicians such as Elías Jaua and Francisco Arias Cárdenas were excluded from the process. During the primaries, irregularities and acts of violence took place in states such as Barinas and Zulia. The PSUV vicepresident, Diosdado Cabello, declared that the fact that a candidate won the party's primaries did not mean that they would be the candidate for the elections.

Despite initially opposing participation, on 31 August the opposition, under the Unitary Platform coalition, announced its intention to run in the elections and nominated candidates under the Democratic Unity Roundtable (MUD) card, after three years without having done so, although considering that the elections "they will not be fair or conventional".

On election day, violence was reported in the Zulia state, including a polling center where colectivos fired upon. In total two people were killed and others were injured. The Office of the United Nations High Commissioner for Human Rights expressed its concern about the reports. The results announced that the ruling PSUV won governorships in at least 18 of the 23 states. The announced turnout was 42.2%.

After politician Adolfo Superlano filed an appeal before the Supreme Tribunal of Justice (TSJ), the high court suspended the totalization of votes and the proclamation of the governor in the state of Barinas, when the CNE projections favored opposition candidate Freddy Superlano. The TSJ disqualified Superlano and ordered the elections to be repeated. A rerun was held in Barinas on 9 January which resulted as a win for the opposition candidate, Sergio Garrido, with 55.4% of the votes, while PSUV candidate Jorge Arreaza received 41.3%. The victory of the opposition brought an end to 22 years of PSUV rule and was considered as a symbolic victory.

The European Union Observation Mission concluded that the elections were marked by lack of judicial independence and rule of law, arbitrary electoral disqualifications and the use of state resources for campaigning, despite having a more balanced electoral arbiter and improvements compared to previous elections. The Carter Center, which also observed the elections, concluded that the elections did not meet electoral international standards.

== Background ==
Article 2 of the Law of Regularization of the Constitutional and Legal Periods of the State and Municipal Public Powers, approved in 2010, establishes that the National Electoral Council jointly organize and execute both the elections of governors and legislators of the state, districts and metropolitan, such as elections for mayors and municipal councilors. On 25 February, the official National Assembly elected in December approved in the first discussion the "Repeal Law of the Law of Regularization of the Constitutional and Legal Periods of the State and Municipal Public Powers", which would allow the CNE to organize elections of governors, mayors, state legislative councils and municipal councils jointly. The pro-government deputy Ricardo Sánchez assured that the repealing law was the result of "long conversations" and negotiations between political forces.

On 6 September, during a campaign rally, PSUV candidate for the Trujillo state, Gerardo Márquez, threatened opposition followers, saying "You have to help me (...) where the is a escuálido [oppositionist] we have to we have to beat them out of the institutions". His PSUV followers and supporters applauded him. Lawyer Joel García referred to the event on social networks and called the attention of the Public Ministry, citing the Law Against Hate approved by the 2017 Constituent National Assembly.

=== European Union observation ===
In July, a delegation of officials from the European External Action Service visited Venezuela to assess the feasibility of deploying electoral observers and wrote an internal report, concluding that the minimum conditions for electoral observation had not been met by that time, citing numerous human rights violations and restrictions on freedoms, although they add that the Venezuelan authorities had hinted that this could change through political negotiation. The report warned that the deployment of a European Union (EU) mission was likely to have an adverse impact on the reputation and credibility of the EU, that it could indirectly legitimize the electoral process in the country and that the decision could be contrary to the political line of the European Union. Josep Borrell, the High Representative of the European Union for Foreign Affairs, announced in September the decision to send observers for the election, ignoring the advice of the Foreign Service staff.

On 29 September 2021, Josep Borrell, announced that an agreement was reached with the National Electoral Council (CNE) to send an EU electoral observer mission for the regional elections in Venezuela. Borrell stressed that "an unprecedented electoral process will take place, with the concurrence of the majority of political forces for the first time in recent years". This would be the first time that the European Union has sent an observer mission to Venezuela since the 2006 presidential elections. The MEP of the Socialist Party of Portugal, Isabel Santos, was at the head of the mission. US senators Marco Rubio and Jim Risch expressed their concern over the decision, stating that the observation mission would give Nicolás Maduro international credibility.

=== Aggressions and arrests ===
On 3 September, Justice First candidate for the mayorship of Arismendi, Barinas state, was death threatened and attacked by guerrillas members of the Bolivarian Forces of Liberation, asking him to withdraw his candidacy in favor of the PSUV candidate, Misael Moreno.

On 25 September, Carlos Chancellor, the Ecological Movement's candidate for mayor of Caroní, Bolívar state, was arrested while conducting a campaign rally in San Félix. The arrest was in response to a 2006 arrest warrant that had not been removed from the Police Investigation and Information System; in 2005 Chancellor had been sentenced to five years in prison for opposing the government of Hugo Chávez, and by the date of his arrest in 2021 there was a ruling from a Puerto Ordaz court to nullify the arrest warrants against him. Chancellor was released after being detained for four hours.

On October 3, a radio announcer was attacked by Ernesto Paraqueima, Venezuela First candidate for mayor of the Simón Rodríguez municipality for the party, and his two brothers, in the vicinity of a car wash in El Tigre city. The announcer had complained to Paraqueima about an opinion article in which he was badmouthed.

=== Disqualifications ===
On 20 November, a total of 23 candidates had been disqualified. 15 of the 23 candidates disqualified candidates for the elections belonged were dissident Chavistas.

== Candidacies ==
=== United Socialist Party of Venezuela ===
During the PSUV primary elections, important internal divisions and differences were evident in the ruling party. In the state of Zulia, former governor Francisco Arias Cárdenas challenged the incumbent governor Omar Prieto, despite having been excluded from the process. On 9 July, in the complex of the Misión Vivienda Ciudad Tavacare in Barinas state, violent clashes were recorded between factions of the ruling party that dispute the party's regional candidacy. Followers of the candidate Hugo Chávez Terán, Argenis's nephew and former President Hugo Chávez, denounced that groups led by Alexis Mendoza, allegedly linked to Argenis Chávez, then governor and candidate for reelection, were attacked. Videos were posted on social media of supporters facing punches and even shots at the front of Detachment 331 of the Bolivarian National Guard.

On 11 July, during a campaign event with supporters, the candidate for governor of Carabobo state, José Vielma Mora, demanded that Rafael Lacava, current governor, change the "Chávez eyes" for a bat, the image with which Lacava had identified his management during the last four years and has been painted on walls, tunnels, buses, police patrols, and in general, it's present throughout Carabobo as a symbol of Lacava. In August, the vice president of the PSUV, Diosdado Cabello, assured that the fact that someone won the party's primaries does not mean that they'll be the candidate for the elections, saying: "We must remember that winning the primaries does not mean that they are the candidate. We are preparing to win on November 21, the most important thing is the revolution rather than a candidate".

On 8 August 2021, the PSUV held open primaries for the first time to elect candidates for mayors and governors in the 2021 regional elections. The ruling party primaries were plagued with various irregularities, and even situations of violence, in addition to deep discontent among the voters base of the party. Days after the internal elections, the leadership of the PSUV disrespected the electoral results, and declared winners of the nomination to five candidates who either had not won, or had not participated at all in the election.

=== Unitary Platform ===
Henry Ramos Allup, Secretary General of Democratic Action, representing the so-called G4, the group of most important opposition parties also composed of Primero Justicia, Voluntad Popular and Un Nuevo Tiempo, announced on 31 August 2021 the participation of the Unitary Platform in the regional elections with the electoral card of the Democratic Unity Roundtable, after three years without having done so, in which the majority opposition did not participate in elections due to the lack of democratic conditions and because their card was disabled MUD in January 2018, making it impossible to participate in the 2018 presidential elections. The decision of the main opposition parties to participate in the election was consummated as a result of the negotiations in Mexico between the government of Nicolás Maduro and the opposition led by Juan Guaidó. Within the coalition, La Causa Radical, Encuentro Ciudadano, and Proyecto Venezuela decided not to participate in the elections.

With the start of negotiations between the government and the opposition in August, other opposition leaders also returned from exile, including Enzo Scarano, Juan Miguel Matheus, José Manuel Olivares, and Tomás Guanipa. David Smolansky, commissioner of the Organization of American States for the Venezuelan refugee and migrant crisis and opposition politician, questioned the decision, stating that "Not voting in dictatorship is also a right".

== Conduct ==
On November 19, the vice-president of the National Electoral Council (CNE), Enrique Márquez, declared that international observers cannot conclude on whether there are violations in the electoral process nor make them public.

During election day, eight people were arrested in Lara state for tearing up ballots. In one instance, a woman arrested at the Expedito Cortés polling station in Carora denounced that after choosing to vote for the Democratic Unity Roundtable (MUD), the voting machine registered the vote on the ballot for the United Socialist Party of Venezuela (PSUV).

In the San Francisco municipality, Zulia state, a young man was killed and two others were injured after armed people on board white vans, identified as colectivos, fired at the voting center "Colegio Eduardo Emiro Ferrer". The bodyguard of the ruling party mayor was detained because of the event afterwards. The deputy to the legislative council of Zulia, Eduardo Labrador, denounced been attacked by armed colectivos that broke into the MUD campaign headquarters in the municipality. At the voting center "Madre Laura" Archdiocesan Educational Unit, armed motorized riders fired into the air. After the closing of polling stations in Zulia, a pickup truck rammed into a group of opposition supporters celebrating in front of the house of the MUD candidate, resulting in eleven injured and one dead girl. According to journalist Jhorman Cruz, the suspects were two inebriated men and the police report said that the motives were not political. Violence was also reported in Lara state, where two activists were attacked by colectivos.

== Results ==
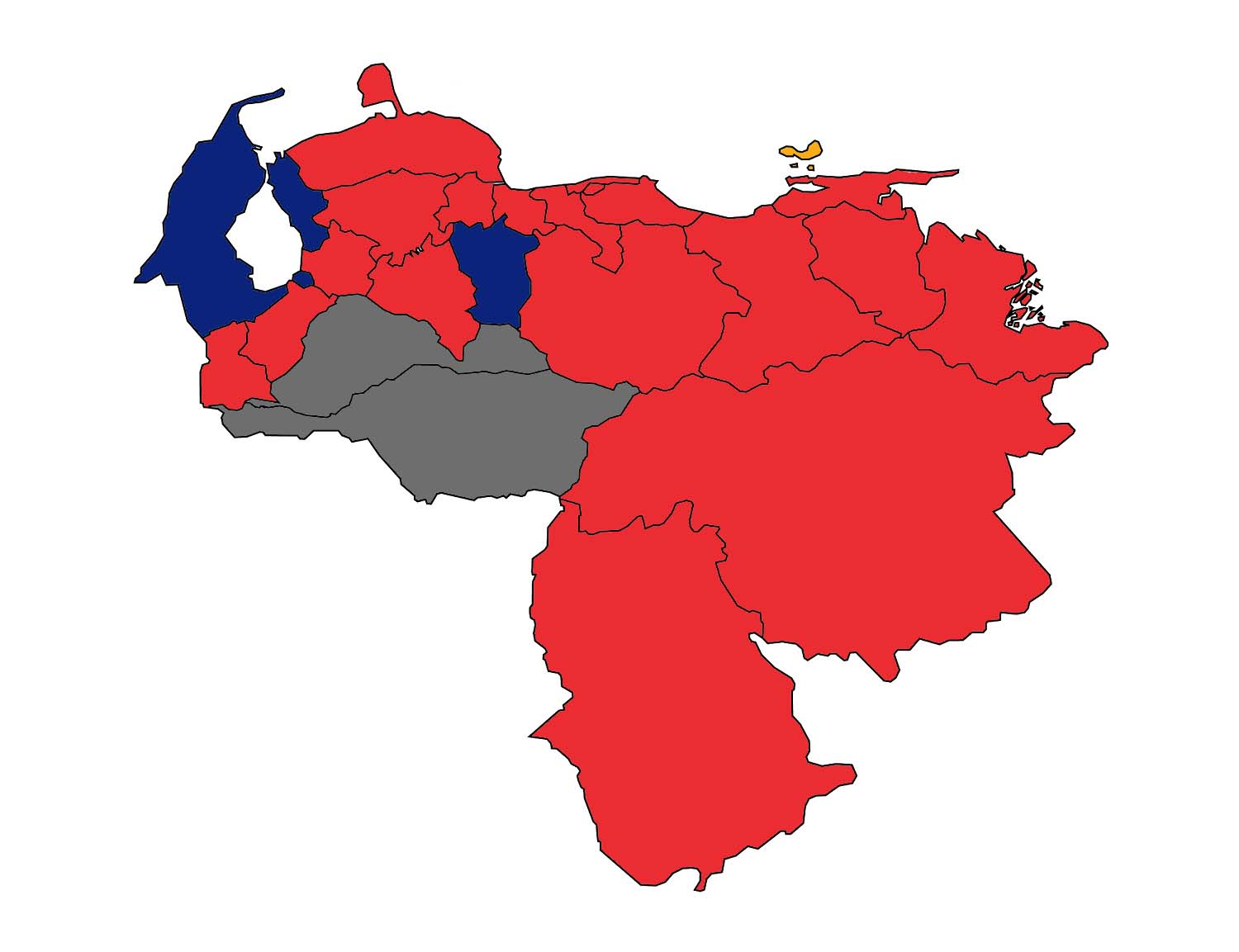
Results of the first CNE announced bulletin

The CNE projected that the CNE the ruling United Socialist Party of Venezuela won 18 of the 23 governorships, while the Democratic Unity Roundtable won two, and the Neighborhood Force party won one. By 22 November two states remained disputed. The PSUV-led Great Patriotic Pole alliance won 205 of 322 mayoral races, with the Democratic Unity Roundtable and Democratic Alliance respectively winning 59 and 37, respectively.

The announced turnout was 42.2%. The opposition was also weakened by vote splitting between the Democratic Unity Roundtable, which had been disqualified from running in elections for several years, and the Democratic Alliance.

The European Union Observation Mission concluded that the elections were marked by lack of judicial independence and rule of law, arbitrary electoral disqualifications and the use of state resources for campaigning, despite having a more balanced electoral arbiter and improvements compared to previous elections. The Carter Center, which also observed the elections, concluded that the elections did not meet electoral international standards.

== See also ==
- State protector
