= Teófilo Rodríguez =

- Born: Teófilo Alfredo Rodríguez Cazorla; August 16, 1971; Porlamar, Venezuela
- Status: Dead
- Died: January 24, 2016 (aged 44); Porlamar, Venezuela
- Criminal charges: Drug trafficking, murder, theft
- Penalty: 11 years in prison

Details
- Imprisoned at: San Antonio Prison (2003–2014)

Teófilo Rodríguez Cazorla nicknamed "El Conejo" (Rabbit) (Porlamar, Isla de Margarita, August 16, 1971 – January 24, 2016) was a Venezuelan criminal, known for being the leader of the cartel called "Tren del Pacífico" (Train Pacific) and San Antonio Prison in Venezuela.

== Biography ==
El Conejo was born in Porlamar, Venezuela. As a child, he worked as a messenger for family, while his mother worked as a maid. Teófilo kept his messenger job to adulthood. It was during his time as a messenger when he began performing his early work as a drug trafficker.

== The boss of the prison ==
At the time he was there and after position as the head of the prison, made a number of changes and constructions that drew international attention; pool, animals, church, boxing ring, restaurants, disco, rooms, among other facilities, over 150 firearms and large quantities of drugs within the prison compound.

== Death ==
On January 24, 2016, Teófilo was at a nightclub in Porlamar. On leaving the site, Teófilo and his companions were attacked with firearms when they were in a Toyota Corolla car. "El Conejo" was taken to a hospital, but died hours later as a result of gunshot wounds.
