= Yescia Bloom =

Venezuelan model

- Born: c. 1990
- Died: 30 January 2017; Miami, United States
- Citizenship: Venezuelan
- Occupation: Model

Yescia Bloom (c. 1990 – 30 January 2017) was a Venezuelan model who participated in and won several LGBT beauty pageants in Venezuela and internationally.

== Biography ==
Yescia grew up in the Los Mangos neighborhood of Maracaibo, in Zulia state, in a humble family. At the age of fifteen, she began working on the 5 de Julio Avenue. Years later, she emigrated from Venezuela and settled abroad, underwent several cosmetic surgeries, and traveled to several countries around the world. Bloom participated in LGBT beauty pageants in Venezuela and abroad, winning several.

One of her last surgeries took place in 2016, a facial feminization procedure for her cheekbones, forehead, and cheeks. Afterwards, a cosmetic biopolymer injection administered years earlier spread throughout her body and affected her vital organs. In January 2017, she was hospitalized in Miami, United States, due to a lung infection, and on 30 January, she died of respiratory failure at the age of 26.

The LGBT community in Venezuela and Miss Venezuela pageant queens mourned her death. As of February 2017, her mother had been unable to obtain special permission from the US embassy to retrieve her daughter's body from the United States. Her friend and roommate was handling the legal paperwork for her repatriation to Maracaibo.

== Personal life ==
Yescia Bloom was the eldest of three siblings. She had a romantic relationship that lasted around two years.
