= Mercedes Pulido =

Venezuelan politician and diplomat (1938–2016)

President of UNICEF
- In office 1997–1997
- Preceded by: Ion Goriță
- Succeeded by: Michael Powles

Mercedes Pulido de Briceño (22 March 1938 – 23 August 2016) was a Venezuelan politician, diplomat and social psychologist. She served as Minister of State for Women's Participation in Development from 1994 to 1996. She was President of the UNICEF Executive Board at the international level in 1997.
