= Cornelis Zitman =

Dutch sculptor (1926–2016)

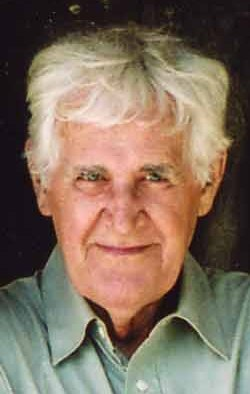
- Zitman in 2006.
- Born: 9 November 1926; Leiden, Netherlands
- Died: 10 January 2016 (aged 89); Caracas, Venezuela
- Known for: Sculpture

Cornelis Zitman (9 November 1926 – 10 January 2016) was a Dutch sculptor and draftsman.

== Biography ==
Zitman was born to a family of construction workers in Leiden, the Netherlands in 1926. He enrolled in the Royal Academy of Art, The Hague at the age of fifteen. On completing his studies in 1947, he refused compulsory military participation, as he disagreed with the Netherlands' political actions in Indonesia, and fled the country aboard a Swedish oil tanker that would take him to Venezuela.

Zitman settled in the city of Coro, where he found work as a technical draftsman for a construction company. In his free time, he painted and made his first incursions into the field of sculpture. Two years later he moved to Caracas, where he worked as a furniture designer at a factory of which he later became manager. In 1951, he received the National Sculpture Prize. He began teaching classes in design at Central University of Venezuela and continued drawing and painting. In 1958, he exhibited a collection of drawings and paintings at the Museum of Contemporary Art of Caracas. He then decided to abandon a life of business and moved to the island of Grenada, where he dedicated himself completely to painting and began to assert his style in sculpting.

In 1961, Zitman traveled to Boston to participate in an exhibition of paintings and design. That same year he returned to the Netherlands with a desire to study smelting techniques. In 1964, he worked as a smelting apprentice to the sculptor Pieter Starreveld before returning definitively to Caracas, contracted by Central University of Venezuela as a professor of design. The following year, he began working more intensively in small format sculpture modeled directly in wax. In 1971, he exhibited for the first time at the Galerie Dina Vierny in Paris. From then on, he dedicated himself exclusively to sculpture. In the following years, he carried out various independent showings in Venezuela, France, Switzerland, the Netherlands, the United States, Japan and other countries, earning various national and international awards. His works can be found in collections and museums of various countries, such as the National Art Gallery and the Museum of Contemporary Art of Caracas in Venezuela, as well as in the Musée Maillol in Paris.

Zitman died on 10 January 2016 at the age of 89.

== Style ==
In his sculptures, Zitman strove to reproduce and exaggerate the morphology of the indigenous peoples of Venezuela, particularly the female figure.

== Awards and exhibitions ==
Through the years, Zitman participated in various international exhibitions, such as the International Sculpture-Drawing Biennial of Budapest, the São Paulo Art Biennial and the International Contemporary Art Fairs of Paris (FIAC) and Madrid (ARCO). His most prominent individual exhibitions can be found at the Dina Vierny Gallery in Paris, the Museum of Contemporary Art of Caracas, the Tokoro Gallery in Tokyo, the Museum of Modern Art in Bogotá (MAMBO) and the Sculptures by the Sea Museum in Scheveningen, Netherlands.

Zitman also earned several awards, among them the National Sculpture Prize at the Hall of Plastic Arts in Caracas (1951), First Prize at the Sculpture Biennial of Budapest (1971), the Acquisition Prize of the Contemporary Art Museum of Caracas at the Biennial of Visual Arts (1981) and Special Prize in the 3rd Kotaro Takamura Grand Prize Exhibition at the Hakone Open-Air Museum outside of Tokyo (1982). In 2005, he was decorated with the Knight of the Order of the Netherlands Lion.
