= States of emergency in Venezuela =

States of emergency of Venezuela are sometimes declared. They were declared once in 2015 due to the 2015 Colombia–Venezuela migrant crisis, and again in May 2016 by the president Nicolás Maduro who suggested that there had been a plot to overthrow the Venezuelan government.

== 2015 ==
A state of emergency was declared in 2015 due to issues near the Colombian border, resulting in the suspension of constitutional guarantees and the Venezuela–Colombia migrant crisis.

== 2016 ==
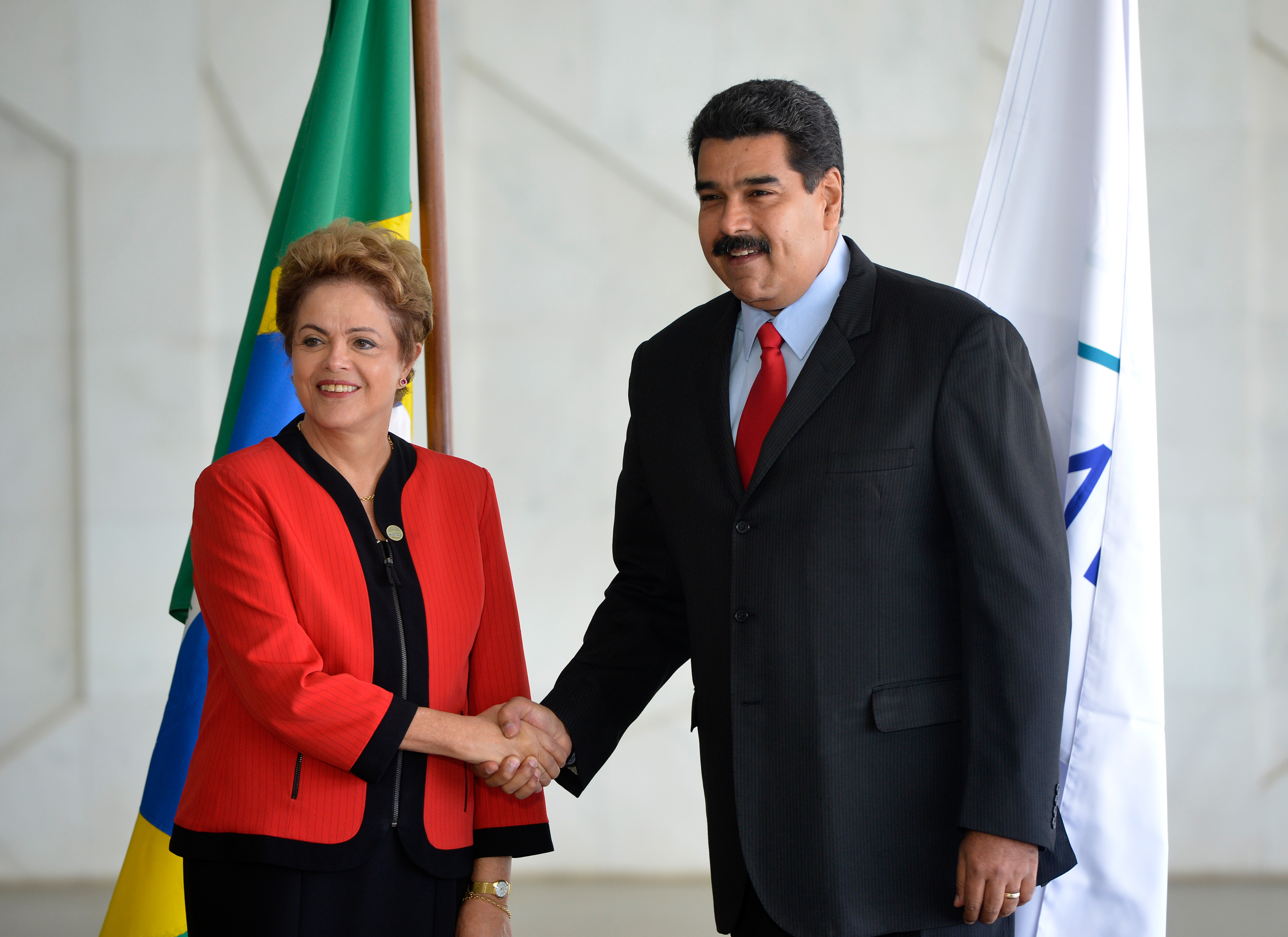
Dilma Rousseff and Nicolás Maduro

On 13 May 2016 a state of emergency was declared in Venezuela by President Nicolás Maduro. The details of this emergency condition were not explained by Maduro but he mentioned conspiracy within the country and from an OPEC country and the United States to overthrow the Caracas government.

=== Rationale ===
Maduro accused the United States of fomenting a hidden coup against his government. On 13 May, Friday night, state television broadcast statements by Maduro saying: "Washington is activating measures at the request of Venezuela’s fascist right, who are emboldened by the coup in Brazil." According to Maduro's opinion, the impeachment process against Brazilian president Dilma Rousseff is a sign that shows he was the next one. In a meeting with the Council of Ministers Maduro stated that the state of emergency decree is directed against "oligarchical parasites and speculators".

=== Responses ===
The opposition-dominated National Assembly started a process to recall Maduro as president, citing as motives bad conditions such as food and medicine shortages, power cuts, looting and increasing of inflation rate, along with complaints of corruption, drug trafficking and human rights violations. Tomás Guanipa, opposition lawmaker, said: "Today Maduro has again violated the constitution. Why? Because he is scared of being recalled."

In the lead up to the declaration, United States intelligence officials told reporters that they were worried about an economic and political crisis in Venezuela, predicting that Maduro would not complete his presidency. They added: "You can hear the ice cracking. You know there's a crisis coming."

== 2026 ==
=== United States strikes ===
Venezuela declared a nationwide state of emergency after explosions were reported across Caracas and sitting President Nicolás Maduro accused the United States of attacking civilian and military installations.

SItting president Nicolás Maduro was captured by the United States, as a prisoner of war.

=== Earthquakes ===
On 24 June 2026, two earthquakes measured at magnitudes 7.1 and 7.5 struck north-central Venezuela. The earthquakes mainly affected La Guaira and Caracas. Multiple landslides have been triggered across northern Venezuela.

The United States government has committed nearly $400 million to earthquake response efforts. Total of 310 American firefighters, engineers, doctors and other specialists sent by the U.S. government returned to the United States after 12 days. They had rescued five survivors. At least 6,100 people have been killed.

== See also ==
- 2014–16 Venezuelan protests
- Crisis in Venezuela
- Timeline of the 2016 Venezuelan protests
- 2026 United States strikes in Venezuela
