= Hernán Alemán =

Venezuelan politician (1955–2020)

Mayor of Cabimas
- In office 1989–1996

Mayor of Cabimas
- In office 2000–2008

Deputy to the Asamblea Nacional for the 10th circuit, state of Zulia
- In office 2011–2020

Personal details
- Born: Hernán Claret Alemán Pérez; May 21, 1955
- Died: July 7, 2020 (aged 65)
- Cause of death: COVID-19 complications
- Party: Acción Democrática (AD)

Hernán Claret Alemán Pérez (21 May 1955 – 7 July 2020) was a Venezuelan politician who served on the National Assembly representing the state of Zulia. He was a member of the Acción Democrática (AD) political party.

== Early life ==
Hernán Alemán was born on 21 May 1955.

== Political career ==
Hernán Alemán served as the mayor of the Cabimas municipality from 1989 to 1996, and again from 2000 to 2008. He was elected as a deputy to represent the 10th circuit of the state of Zulia for the 2011 to 2015 period, and reelected for the period spanning 2016 to 2021 by the opposition Democratic Unity Roundtable he was a politician in exile who lived in Colombia.

== Operation Gideon ==
In May 2020, Alemán gave several interviews in which he stated that he was involved in the planning of what became Operation Gideon on 3 to 4 May 2020. He stated that he visited the training camps in the Colombian Guajira, and indicated he had a great relationship with Jordan Goudreau, the founder of the private military company Silvercorp, involved in the 4 May event. Alemán described Goudreau as "an extraordinary man, a friend, with extraordinary skills".

== Death ==
Alemán died in Colombia on 7 July 2020, at 65 years old from COVID-19 complications during the COVID-19 pandemic in Colombia.
