= La última pieza =

2021 Venezuelan short film

- Film poster
- Directed by: Ricardo Muñoz Senior
- Written by: Ricardo Muñoz Senior
- Produced by: Euwabey Films
- Starring: Ricardo Muñoz Senior; Samantha Castillo; Victor Oliveira
- Release date: September 9, 2021 (United States)
- Running time: 14 minutes
- Language: Spanish

La última pieza (lit. 'The Last Piece', Puzzle) is a 2021 short film directed by Venezuelan filmmaker Ricardo Muñoz Senior. The film is a dystopian fiction that is inspired and satirizes Latin American socialist governments.

== Plot ==
A working-class man must face a hostile and indifferent bureaucracy in order to finish a puzzle game.

== Cast ==
- Ricardo Muñoz Senior as Albertini
- Samantha Castillo as the Madam Commissioner
- Victor Oliveira as the General
- Franco Tintori as the Cashier
- Gabriel Atala Garay as the Soldier
- Laura de Freitas as the Public Official 2

== Reception ==
The film was the only Venezuelan and Latin American short in the official selection of the 39th Torino Film Festival in 2021. It was also awarded as the Best Foreign Film at the 2021 Victory International Film Festival 2021, as well as Best Short Film Screenplay and Special Jury Mention at the 13th Seattle Latino Film Festival. The film was set to be premiered from 28 to 31 January 2022 at the 16th National and International "Manuel Trujillo Durán" Short Film Festival in Venezuela, held in the Zulia state.

== See also ==
- Pink tide
