= Justo Noguera Pietri =

Venezuelan politician

Governor of Bolívar
- In office 15 October 2017 – November 2021

Personal details
- Born: Justo José Noguera Pietri; 15 March 1961 (age 65) Portuguesa
- Party: PSUV

Justo Noguera Pietri (born 15 March 1961) is a Venezuelan politician who served as the governor of Bolívar. He was proclaimed as state governor by the National Electoral Council following the 2017 Venezuelan regional elections and served from October 2017 to November 2021.

== Early life and education ==
Justo José Noguera Pietri was born on 15 March 1961, in Portuguesa. He graduated from the Officer Training School of the National Guard in 1984.
