= Francisco Rangel Gómez =

Venezuelan politician

Francisco Gómez

Governor of Bolívar
- In office 2004–2017
- Preceded by: Antonio Rojas Suárez
- Succeeded by: Justo Noguera Pietri

Personal details
- Party: PSUV

Francisco Gómez is a Venezuelan politician. He was governor of Bolívar state. In the 2008 Venezuelan regional elections he won 67% of the vote, against Andrés Velásquez' 30%. He was previously president of the Corporacion Venezolana de Guayana (CVG).

== Career ==
While on the negotiation commission to resolve the 15-month-long dispute at SIDOR, Rangel ordered the National Guard to fire on protesting SIDORworkers." In April 2008, President Hugo Chávez ordered SIDORto be nationalised.

== Sanctions ==
Rangel has been sanctioned by several countries.

In November 2017, the Government of Canada sanctioned Rangel Gómez as being someone who participated in "significant acts of corruption or who have been involved in serious violations of human rights".

On January 6, 2018 the US Department of State issued sanctions against Francisco Rangel Gómez and 3 other officials of the Venezuelan government for their alleged links with corruption networks.

In March 2018, Panama sanctioned 55 public officials, including Rangel Gómez.

Preceded by Antonio Rojas Suárez	Governor of Bolívar; 2004–2017	Succeeded by Justo Noguera Pietri
