= List of governors of Portuguesa =

- State coat of arms

- Flag of the State
- Incumbent; Primitivo Cedeño
- Style: Governor
- Status: Head of State
- Term length: Four years

This is a list of governors of the Venezuelan Portuguesa State:

Until 1989, they were appointed by the president of Venezuela. Starting from that year they are elected in universal, direct and secret elections.

== Elected governors ==
Took office	Left office	Governor	Vote
1989	1992	Elias D'Onghia Colaprico, Democratic Action	38.40
1992	1995	Elias D'Onghia Colaprico, Democratic Action	36.81
1995	1998	Iván Colmenares, MAS	52.74
1998	2000	Iván Colmenares, MAS	48.72
2000	2004	Antonia Muñoz, MVR	50.08
2004	2008	Antonia Muñoz, MVR	59.99
2008	2012	Wilmar Castro, PSUV	57.00
2012	2016	Wilmar Castro, PSUV	53.76
2016	2017	Reinaldo Castañeda, PSUV	Replacement after Castro resigned
2017	2021	Rafael Calles, PSUV	64,71%
2021	2025	Primitivo Cedeño, PSUV	45,76%
2025	2029	Primitivo Cedeño, GPPSB	93.61 %

== See also ==
- List of Venezuela governors
- Politics of Venezuela
- History of Venezuela
