= List of governors of Cojedes =

- State coat of arms

- Flag of the State
- Incumbent; José Alberto Galindez
- Style: Governor
- Status: Head of State
- Term length: Four years

This is a list of governors of the Venezuelan Cojedes State:

Until 1989, they were appointed by the president of Venezuela. Starting from that year they are elected in universal, direct and secret elections.

== Elected governors ==
Took office	Left office	Governor	Vote
1989	1992	José Gerardo Lozada, Acción Democrática	47.56
1992	1995	José Felipe Machado, COPEI	44.32
1995	1998	José Alberto Galíndez, Acción Democrática	45.39
1998	2000	José Alberto Galíndez, Acción Democrática	54.14
2000	2004	Jhonny Yánez Rangel, MVR	49.36
2004	2008	Jhonny Yánez Rangel, MVR	56.13
2008	2012	Teodoro Bolívar, PSUV	52.44
2012	2016	Erika Farías, PSUV	63.43
2016	2017	Margaud Godoy, PSUV	Replacement after Farías resigned
2017	2021	Margaud Godoy, PSUV	55,68
2021	2025	José Alberto Galíndez, MUD	48,52
2025	2029	José Alberto Galíndez, MUD	55,22

== See also ==
- List of Venezuela governors
- Politics of Venezuela
- History of Venezuela
