= List of governors of Delta Amacuro =

- State coat of arms

- Flag of the State
- Incumbent; Loa Tamaronis
- Style: Governor
- Status: Head of State
- Term length: Four years

This is a list of governors of the Venezuelan Delta Amacuro State:

Until 1989, they were appointed by the president of Venezuela. Starting from that year they are elected in universal, direct and secret elections.

== Elected governors ==
Delta Amacuro's bid for statehood was approved in 1991.

Took office	Left office	Governor	Vote
1992	1994	Emeri Mata Millán, COPEI	38.40
1994	1995	Armando Salazar, MAS	56.36
1995	1998	Emeri Mata Millán, Democratic Action	52.17
1998	2000	Emeri Mata Millán, COPEI	56.20
2000	2004	Yelitza Santaella, MAS	63.15
2004	2008	Yelitza Santaella, PSUV	61.30
2008	2012	Lizeta Hernández, PSUV	55.54
2012	2017	Lizeta Hernández, PSUV	82.08
2017	2025	Lizeta Hernández, PSUV	60,24
2025	2029	Loa Tamaronis, PSUV	94,13

== See also ==
- List of Venezuela governors
- Politics of Venezuela
- History of Venezuela
