= List of governors of Mérida =

This is a list of governors of the Venezuelan Mérida State:

Until 1989, they were appointed by the president of Venezuela. Starting from that year they are elected in universal, direct and secret elections.

== Designated ==
Date	Name	Party
1942–1944	Tulio Chiossone Villamizar	Independiente
1947–1948	Antonio Parra León	Acción Democrática
1948 – 1953?	José Barrios Mora	Copei
1953–1958	Vicente Tálamo Pacheco	Dictadura militar
1959–1960	Carlos Febres Poveda	Copei
1960–1962	Pedro Espinosa Viloria	Acción Democrática
1962–1964	Luciano Noguera Mora	Copei
1964–1965	José Nucete Sardi	Acción Democrática
1965–1967	Edilberto Moreno Peña	Acción Democrática
1967	Ramón Augusto Obando	Acción Democrática
1967–1968	Gustavo López	Acción Democrática
1968	Jesús Moreno Rangel	Acción Democrática
1969–1973	Germán Briceño Ferrigni	Copei
1973–1974	Bernardo Celis Parra	Copei
1974–1979	Rigoberto Henríquez Vera	Acción Democrática
1979–1980	Reinaldo Chalbaud Zerpa	Copei
1981–1982	Edecio La Riva Araujo	Copei
1983–1984	Germán Monzón Salas	Copei
1984–1986	William Dávila	Acción Democrática
1986–1987	Carlos Consalvi Bottaro	Acción Democrática
1987	Ramón Vicente Casanova	Acción Democrática
1988–1989	Orlando Gutiérrez	Acción Democrática
1989	Alexis Paparoni	Acción Democrática

== Elected governors ==
Took office	Left office	Governor	Vote
1989	1992	Jesús Rondón Nucete, COPEI	48.00
1992	1995	Jesús Rondón Nucete, COPEI	48.46
1995	1998	William Dávila Barrios, Democratic Action	45.12
1998	2000	William Dávila Barrios, Democratic Action	41.59
2000	2004	Florencio Porras, MVR	48.47
2004	2008	Florencio Porras, MVR	60.75
2008	2012	Marcos Díaz Orellana, PSUV	52.08
2012	2017	Alexis Ramírez, PSUV	50.23
2017	2021	Ramón Guevara, Democratic Action	50.82
2021	2025	Jehyson Guzmán, PSUV	40.77
2025	2025	Richar Lobo Sivoli, PSUV	
2025	2029	Arnaldo Sánchez, GPPSB	80.98

== See also ==
- List of Venezuela governors
- Politics of Venezuela
- History of Venezuela
