= 2024 Venezuelan political crisis =

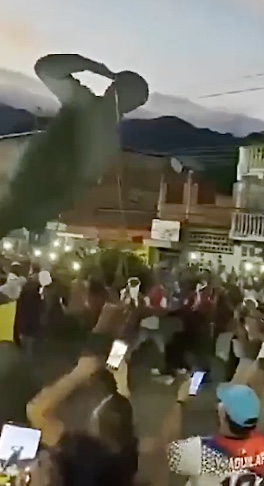
Statue of Hugo Chávez being pulled down during the 2024 Venezuelan protests

The 2024 Venezuelan political crisis was a period of crisis in Venezuela, aggravated after the 2024 Venezuelan presidential election results were announced. The 2024 election was held to choose a president for a six-year term beginning on 10 January 2025. Incumbent Nicolás Maduro ran for a third consecutive term, while former diplomat Edmundo González Urrutia represented the Unitary Platform (Spanish: Plataforma Unitaria Democrática, PUD), the main opposition political alliance, after the Venezuelan government barred leading candidate María Corina Machado from participating.

International monitors called the election neither free nor fair, citing the Maduro administration having controlled most institutions and repressed the political opposition before and during the election. Academics, news outlets and the opposition provided strong evidence showing that González won the election by a wide margin. The National Electoral Council (CNE) announced results claiming a narrow Maduro victory. The results were rejected by American charity the Carter Center, the Organization of American States (OAS), and the United Nations. Political scientist Steven Levitsky called the official results "one of the most egregious electoral frauds in modern Latin American history".

A 6 August article in The New York Times stated that the CNE declaration that Maduro won "plunged Venezuela into a political crisis that has claimed at least 22 lives in violent demonstrations, led to the jailing of more than 2,000 people and provoked global denunciation." In the aftermath of the government's announcement of the results, protests occurred across the country, as the Maduro administration initiated Operation Tun Tun, a crackdown on dissent, and detained opposition political figures. Criminalization of protest was condemned by human rights organizations such as Amnesty International. Maduro did not acknowledge the claims that he lost the election, and instead asked the Supreme Tribunal of Justice (TSJ), largely composed of justices loyal to Maduro, on 1 August to audit the results. On 22 August the TSJ described the CNE's statement of Maduro winning the election as "validated". On 2 September, an arrest warrant was issued for González, and he left Venezuela for asylum in Spain on 7 September.

== Initial reactions to election results ==
=== Fraud allegations ===
Anne Applebaum wrote in The Atlantic that it "was absolutely clear by [31 July] that ... the election had been stolen". Independent observers have described the election results as arbitrary, even by Venezuelan standards, according to The Guardian.

Political scientist Steven Levitsky called the vote "one of the most egregious electoral frauds in modern Latin American history."

Attorney Juan Carlos Delpino, one of the five CNE rectors, went into hiding after the election. Delpino stated in an interview with The New York Times that he had seen no evidence of a Maduro victory, expressing personal shame that the CNE had "failed the country". Delpino noted irregularities in the election including the absence of published vote tallies from the CNE, and a lack of CNE pre-election meetings that allowed CNE head Amoroso to make "unilateral" decisions.

=== Domestic ===
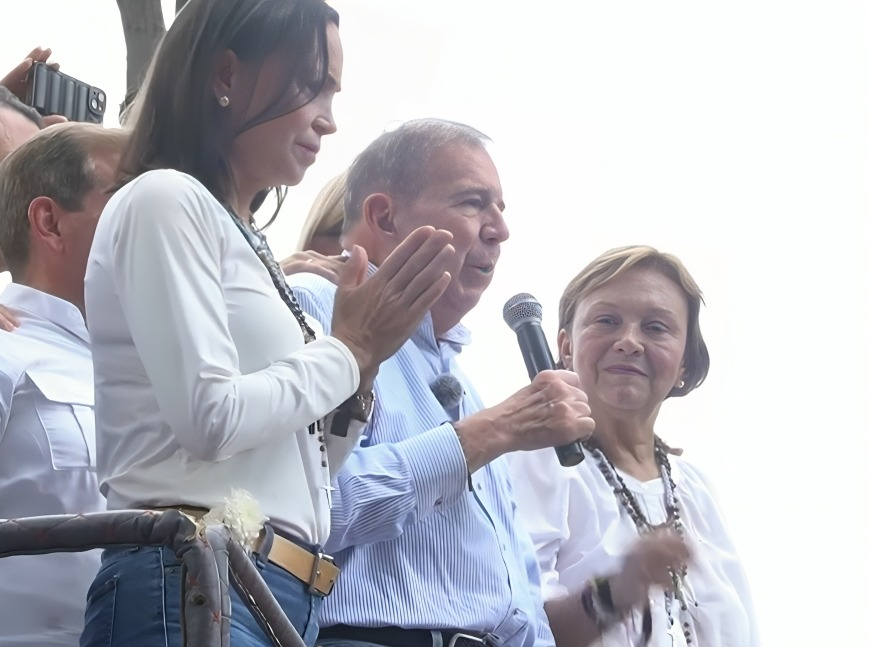
Machado and González along with his wife, addressing the nation in front of the United Nations Development Programme office in Caracas, 2024

María Corina Machado and Edmundo González rejected the results from the CNE and claimed victory.

Maduro described the result as "a triumph of peace and stability", while alleging that the US was fomenting civil war in Venezuela and blaming the turmoil on "international Zionism".

A Meganálisis poll of 1,007 people in Venezuela from 8 to 11 August found that 93% of respondents believe Maduro lost the election. Venezuelans who responded that they were happy were 2.8%, and the poll found that 40% hoped to leave the country before the end of 2024.

==== Alleged cyberattack on electoral system ====
On 29 July, CNE head Elvis Amoroso stated that during the election, CNE had been the victim of a cyberattack originating in North Macedonia, and accused the opposition of orchestrating it. Stefan Andonovski, Minister of Digital Transformation for North Macedonia, stated that "this is a socialist regime that for years has often leaked information not supported by evidence and accuses interested parties and states that have no responsibility in such cases." Jennie Lincoln from the Carter Center said there was no evidence of a cyberattack, including from "companies that monitor and know when there is a denial of service". As of June 2026, the official CNE website is still offline.

=== International ===
The election results released by the government-controlled National Electoral Council (CNE) were followed by a mixture of scepticism and criticism from the leaders of most Latin American countries. Some Latin American countries—including Cuba, Honduras, and Nicaragua—recognized and congratulated Maduro as the election winner. Some world leaders expressed skepticism of the claimed results and did not recognize the CNE claims; however, The Washington Post reported that "Russia, China, Iran and Cuba were among those to congratulate Maduro".

Map showing the countries that declared Edmundo González as the winner of the presidential election as of January 2025. Italy also recognized González as president-elect.

President Gabriel Boric of Chile was the first foreign leader to question the CNE result, stating that the "results are difficult to believe". President Daniel Noboa of Ecuador warned that "that is the danger of dictatorship, and today we are witnessing how one more of them tries to take hope away from millions of Venezuelans." Condemnation from some countries, including Costa Rica, El Salvador, Peru and Uruguay described the CNE result in terms of fraud or corruption. Harsh criticism came from President Javier Milei of Argentina, who called Maduro a dictator. Argentina recognized González as president-elect on 7 August.

The three leftist presidents of Brazil, Colombia and Mexico were quick in demanding that all votes be counted, along with full transparency of all ballot records from each precinct. Mexico and Colombia rejected the results and called for transparency and verification. The Colombian government called for the "total vote count, its verification and independent audit to be carried out as soon as possible". President Luiz Inácio Lula da Silva of Brazil called the controversy a "normal" process, but asked for the release of the total vote tally. President Andrés Manuel López Obrador of Mexico said on 30 July that the vote tallies should be publicized, but he saw no evidence of fraud. On 1 August, the three presidents released a joint statement of concern over post-election violence, and asking for "impartial verification of results" quickly, at the disaggregated level. Officials from the three nations—whose governments are allied with Maduro according to the Associated Press (AP)—have worked with the government and the opposition, "seeking a solution to the country's political crisis". The AP writes that the opposition has reason to be wary of recommendations from this group to "follow Venezuelan laws and appear before the appropriate institutions", since the "ruling party controls every aspect of government, including the justice system, and uses it to defeat and repress real and perceived opponents".

United States Secretary of State Antony Blinken initially expressed doubts about the veracity of the results from the CNE, and on 1 August, said there was "overwhelming evidence" that González won. He called for talks and a peaceful transition, but the US has not referred to González as president-elect. (Note: The Washington Post,The Wall Street Journal, and Reuters say that Blinken did not recognize González as president-elect; The Guardian says that he did.) The Miami Herald wrote on 7 August that Mark Wells, a State Department official, suggested in a phone call with reporters that the US was deferring to ongoing negotiations between Maduro and the Brazil, Colombia and Mexico, while spokesperson Matthew Miller said they weren't yet endorsing a president-elect.

On 29 July, Canada's deputy prime minister Chrystia Freeland expressed that Canada had "serious concerns" about the proclaimed election results. Freeland emphasized Canada's long-standing support for Venezuela's democratic opposition and condemned the increasingly authoritarian nature of the regime. In January 2025, Canada formally recognized González as president-elect. The minister of Foreign Affairs Mélanie Joly declared: "Maduro's shameless actions demonstrate that democracy and the rule of law cannot be taken for granted. We will not tolerate the erosion of the democratic process or the repression of citizens seeking to express their rights."

The day after the election, nine Latin American countries (Argentina, Costa Rica, the Dominican Republic, Ecuador, Guatemala, Panama, Paraguay, Peru, and Uruguay) called for an emergency meeting of the OAS, for 31 July. The member states did not reach consensus on a resolution. OAS Secretary General Luis Almagro—referencing the ongoing investigation in the International Criminal Court (ICC) of Venezuela for crimes against humanity—said he would petition the ICC for the arrest of Maduro. Prior to the election, Maduro had stated that if he did not win, there would be a "bloodbath, a civil war"; Almagro said Maduro was fulfilling that promise and it was time for justice.

The deputy prime minister of Italy Antonio Tajani stated that the Italian government was "perplexed" by the reported election results, expressing apprehension about Maduro's claim to victory reflecting "the will of the people." In November, Italy's prime minister Giorgia Meloni recognized Edmundo González as the president-elect of Venezuela.

=== Diplomatic and commercial relations ===
The BBC and The Guardian reported that Peru was the first country to recognize González as Venezuela's president-elect, on 30 July—a statement from the former Peruvian foreign minister that was corrected on 5 September by Peru's Council of Ministers after a new foreign minister was named. Peru had recalled its ambassador from Venezuela on 29 July, and expelled the Venezuelan diplomats from Peru the next day. In response, Venezuela severed diplomatic relations with Peru.

Panama suspended diplomatic relations with Venezuela. Venezuela also expelled diplomats from Argentina, Chile, Costa Rica, the Dominican Republic, Panama and Uruguay; as of 1 August, Brazil took over running the Caracas embassies of Argentina and Peru. Venezuela suspended flights between Venezuela and both Panama and the Dominican Republic after those countries requested a review of the election results. It also ordered the temporary suspension of flights to Peru.

Maduro ordered Argentina to abandon its embassy in Caracas within 72 hours, by 1 August, and cut power to the embassy residence, which was surrounded by security forces. The Argentine Embassy has given asylum to six of Machado's campaign workers since December 2023, when the Maduro administration sought their arrest while she was still a presidential candidate. The Argentine government said the asylum seekers must be given safe passage to leave with embassy personnel, but the Maduro administration did not agree to that condition; Brazil assumed mediation of the situation with the asylum seekers in the embassy residence after Argentine diplomats were expelled. Costa Rica has offered asylum to the six; international law affords protection of diplomatic personnel and political asylum seekers.

== Aftermath ==
=== Protests ===
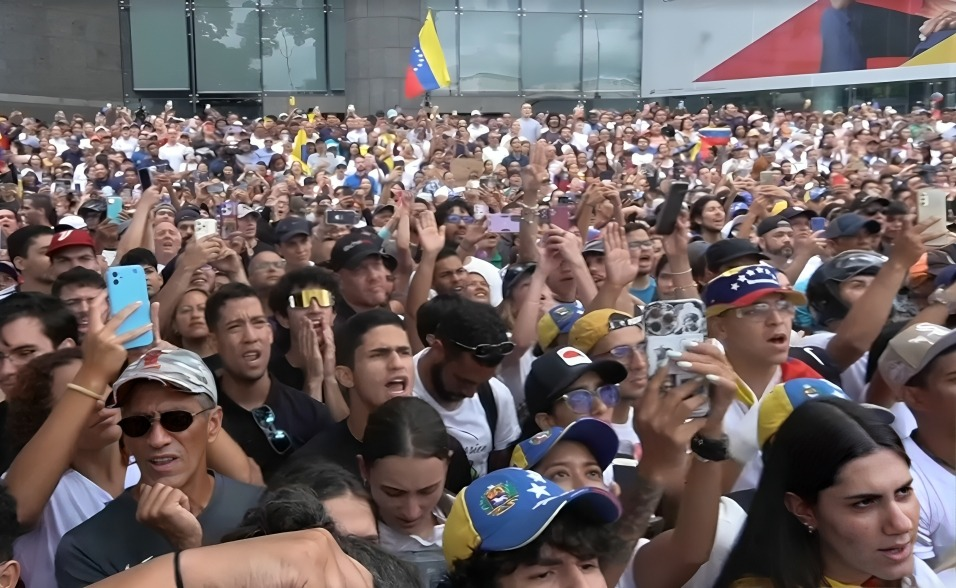
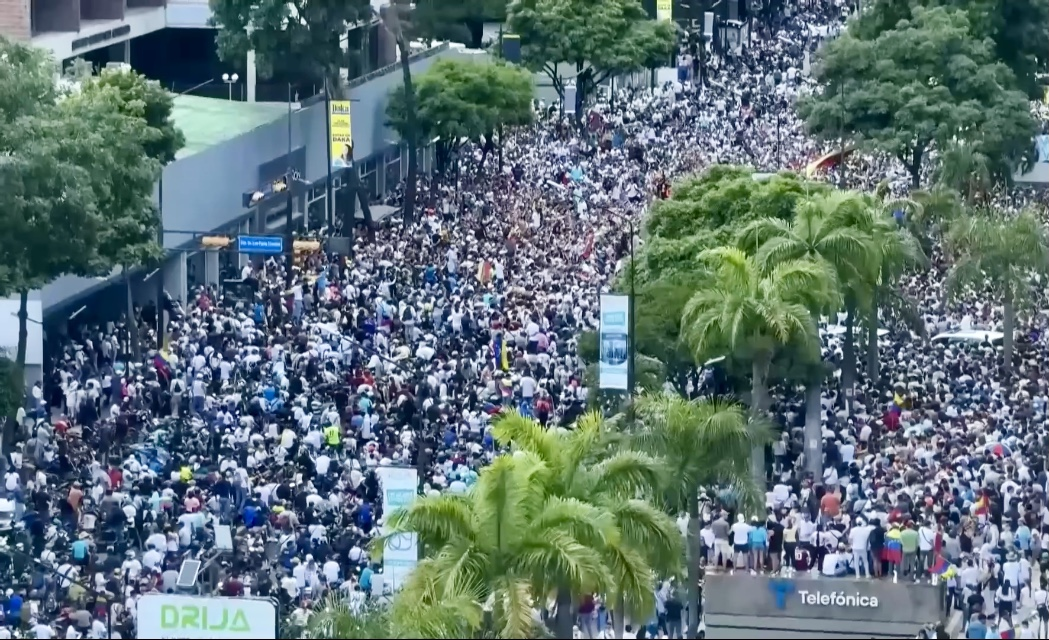
Demonstrators took to the streets of Caracas to protest the CNE results

Venezuelan citizens who considered the results to be fraudulent took to the streets to protest. During the month of July, the Venezuelan Observatory of Social Conflict (OVCS: Observatorio Venezolano de Conflictividad Social) documented 1,311 protests throughout Venezuela; 70% were on 29 or 30 July. OVCS said most of the protests occurred in poor areas, and involved "harassment, arbitrary arrests, threats and political retaliation against leaders and sympathizers of opposition political parties".

As of 15 August, 25 people had been killed during protests nationwide. According to Victims Monitor, those included a 15-year-old; all were shot, and "eight were linked to the military, three to police and seven to the pro-Maduro motorcycle gangs known as 'colectivos'."

On 28 July—the date chosen for the election as it would have been the 70th birthday of Maduro's predecessor Hugo Chávez—nine statues of him were brought down by protesters.

According to Infobae a "forceful statement following the electoral fraud in Venezuela and the criminalization of protests" was published on 1 August by Amnesty International in a joint statement with ten other human rights organizations that "condemned the repressive actions of the Nicolás Maduro regime in Venezuela and demanded that it guarantee the right to protest and full respect for the rights to life, personal integrity and freedom".

=== Crackdown ===
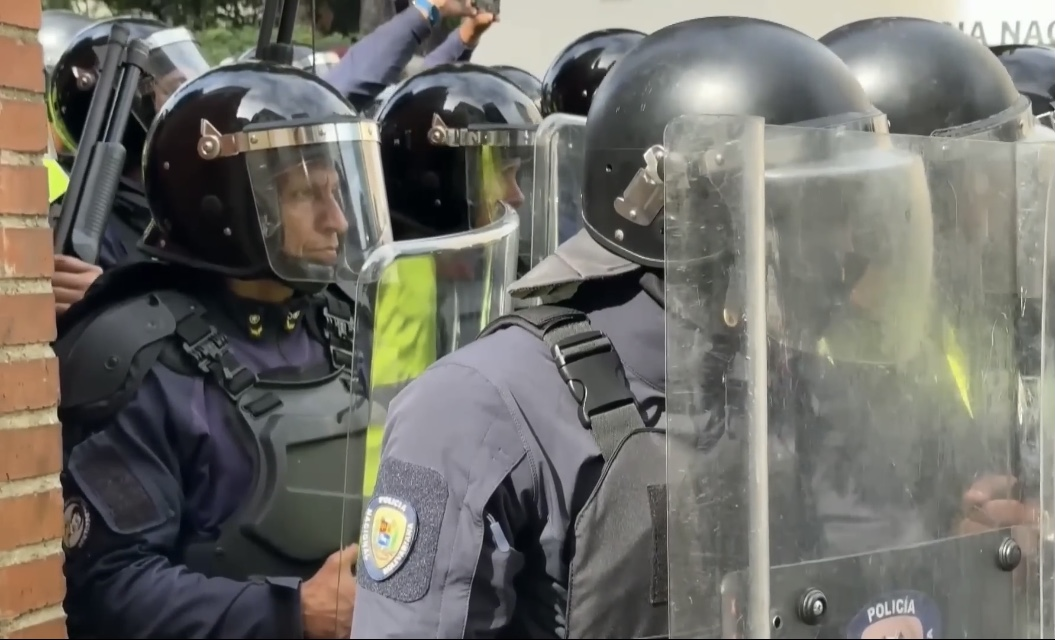
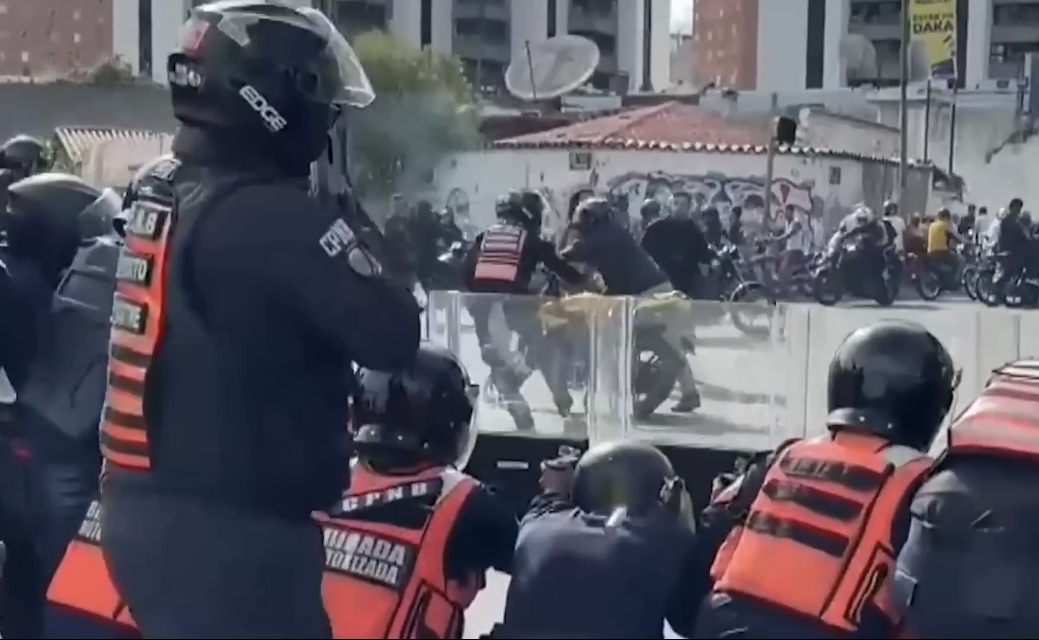
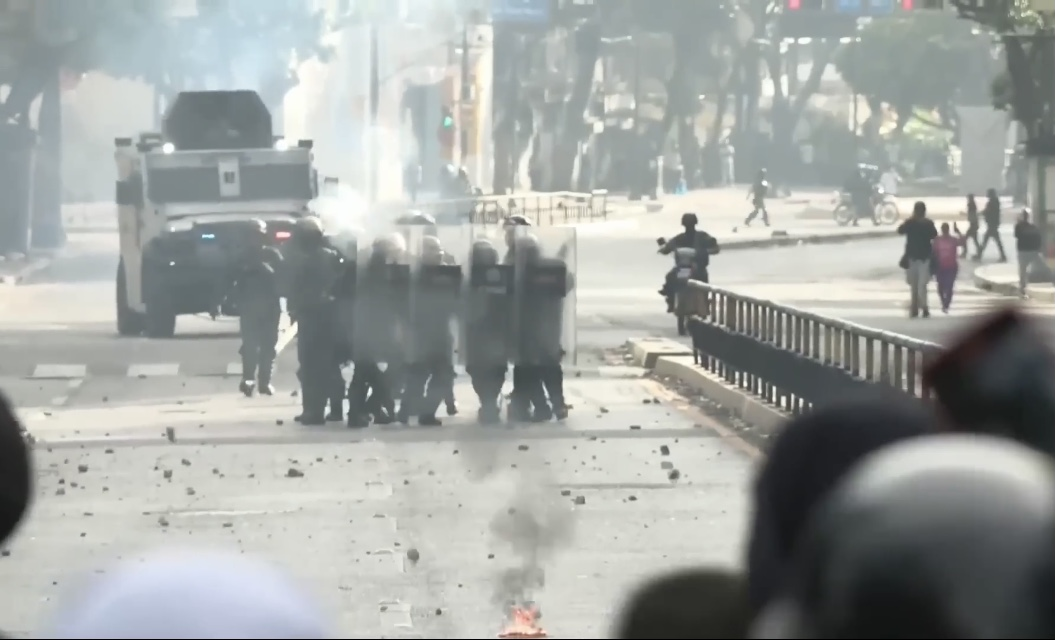
Protests following 2024 Venezuelan presidential election

Maduro accuses the opposition of promoting a coup. In a crackdown by security forces following the elections, he mentioned using Operation Tun Tun; BBC News stated that "rights groups say it consists of the authorities going door-to-door to detain those with links to the protests or the opposition". Rafael Uzcategui of Laboratorio de Paz "suggested the operation was intended to terrify Venezuelans into submission", adding that "what we are seeing is simply an effort to sew [sic] a climate of terror", according to The Guardian.

Maduro personally encouraged individuals to report those protesting the CNE election result through an internet application, VenApp. Another internet page created by the government allows users to post media of protesters where they can be identified by other users. Venezuelans are reportedly leaving their homes without carrying their phones, out of fear that authorities will stop them on the street to search their phones for dissident content.

Opposition leaders said that citizens who witnessed the vote tally sheets in the electoral process (poll watchers) were persecuted and detained. The CNE had their contact data; Maduro accused them of being guerillas, according to NTN24. Many poll watchers reportedly have "fled their homes in fear".

=== Arrests ===
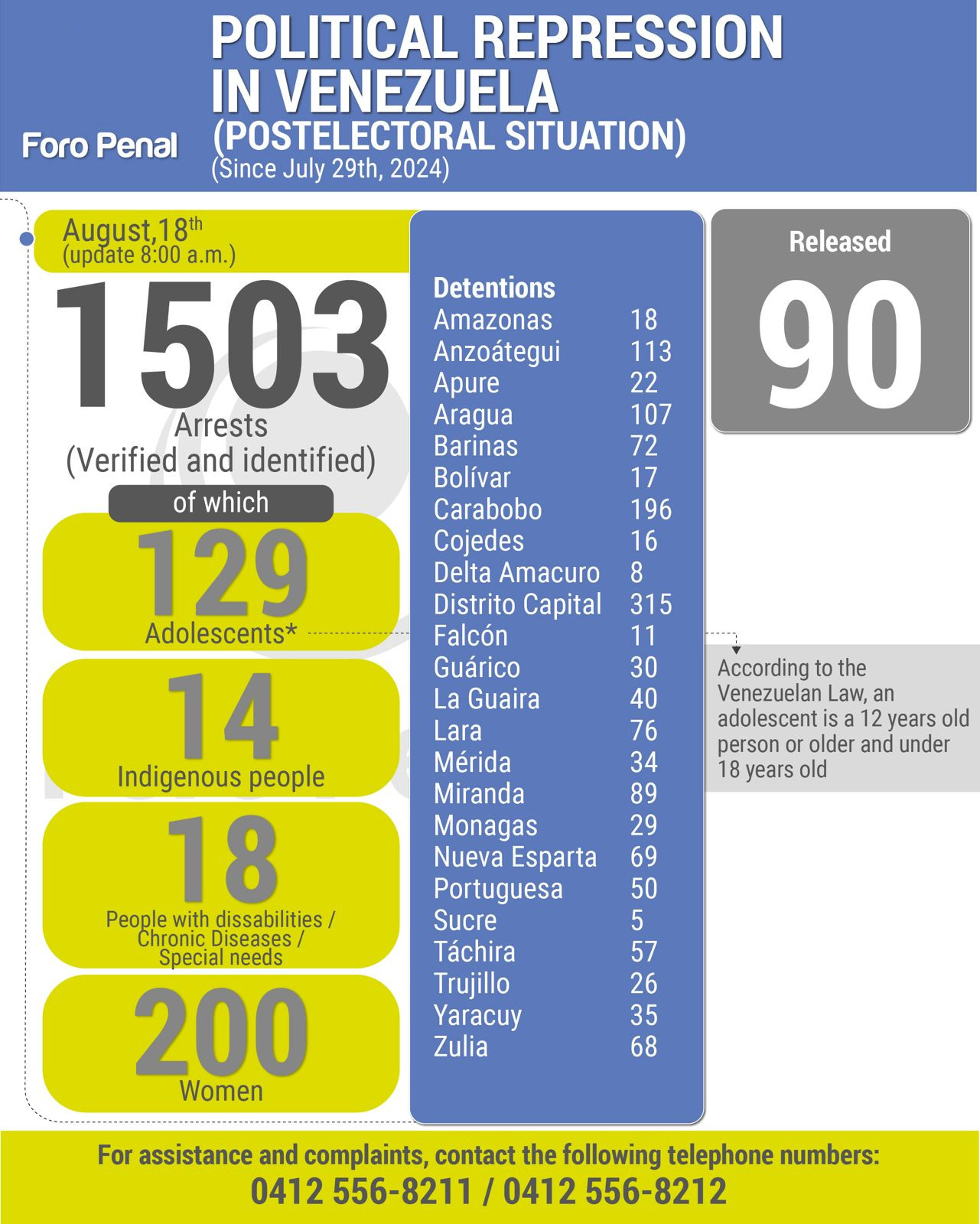
Poster from NGO Foro Penal of incidents they had verified as of 18 August

The Maduro administration reported that at least 2,400 people had been arrested as of 16 August. Maduro ordered two prisons to be rehabilitated to contain the detained.

Venezuelan human rights organization Foro Penal reported on 18 August they had been able to verify 1,503 arrests, including 129 adolescents, during the post-electoral period beginning the day after the elections. By 26 August, it reported that—including political detainees from the pre-electoral period—Venezuela had reached the highest number of political prisoners during the 21st century, at 1,674. On 2 September, they reported that Venezuela had 1,793 political prisoners, of which 1,659, including children, were detained after the election; most have not been sentenced, but are charged with terrorism.

==== Opposition and journalists targeted ====
On 2 August, Vente Venezuela said its offices in Caracas were attacked by six armed individuals who ransacked the premises.

Freddy Superlano, a former candidate, was detained by masked men two days after the election. Shortly before, Cabello had announced that the arrest of ten opposition leaders was planned. A week later, attorney Joel García confirmed that Superlano and journalist Roland Carreño (who also worked for the Popular Will party) were held in El Helicoide on unknown charges. Representatives of Superlano's party said they were told by chavista informants that Superlano would be tortured to "make him confess to the false plan set up by regime spokesmen such as Tarek William Saab".

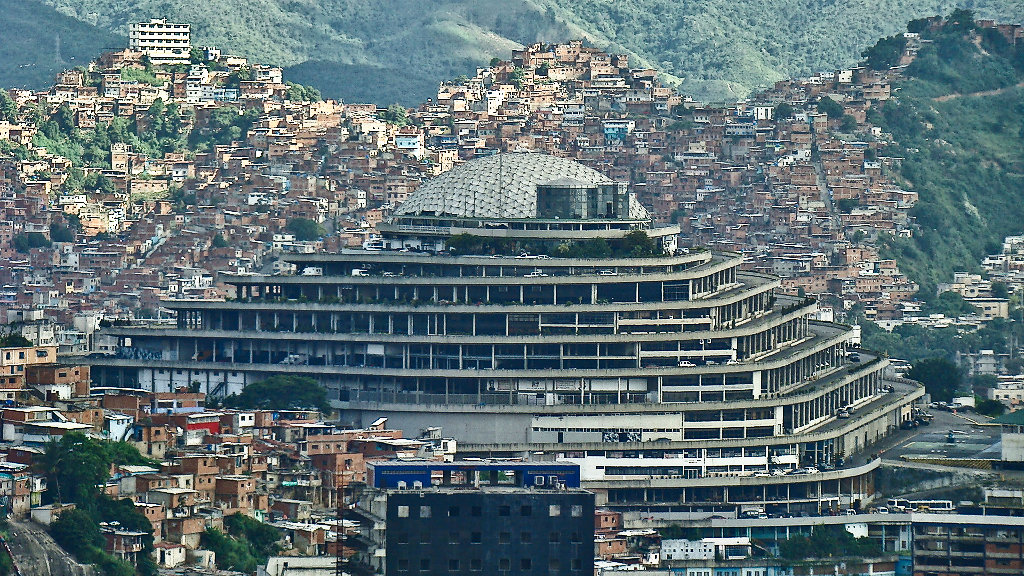
El Helicoide, a building in Caracas owned by the Venezuelan government and used as a facility and prison for both regular and political prisoners of the Bolivarian National Intelligence Service (SEBIN)

The same day that Superlano was detained, Ricardo Estévez, an advisor with Vente Venezuela, was taken from his residence by armed men in unmarked cars. Rafael Sivira, the youth coordinator for opposition party Radical Cause, and another unidentified person were also detained.

Vente Venezuela politician María Oropeza livestreamed as security forces broke into her residence without a search warrant and arrested her two hours after she described the ongoing detentions as a "witch hunt". The Venezuelan SNTP (Syndicate of National Press Workers) denounced that reporter Yousner Alvarado and cameraman Paúl León were arrested shortly after the election, and photographer Deysi Penna was detained on 2 August. That same day, Chilean National Television said its journalist Iván Núñez and his cameraman José Luis Tapia were arrested.

Foro Penal's Romero reported that arrests as of 26 August included 10 persons from the media sector—two arrested before the election, and eight after.

==== Machado's attorney detained ====
Perkins Rocha, Machado's attorney and the legal coordinator of her party Vente Venezuela, was detained, presumably by the Bolivarian National Intelligence Service (SEBIN) on 27 August, according to Villca Fernández, human rights activist. He was taken by force by masked individuals, his whereabouts unknown.

=== Transparency in vote reporting and Supreme Court ruling ===
Opposition leaders, world leaders and observers urged Maduro to make the vote tallies at the polling station level public. Although Maduro stated that he had the tallies, he had not released them as of 21 August. Refusing to cede power, Maduro instead, according to the BBC, "took the unusual step" on 1 August of asking the Supreme Tribunal of Justice to audit and approve the results.

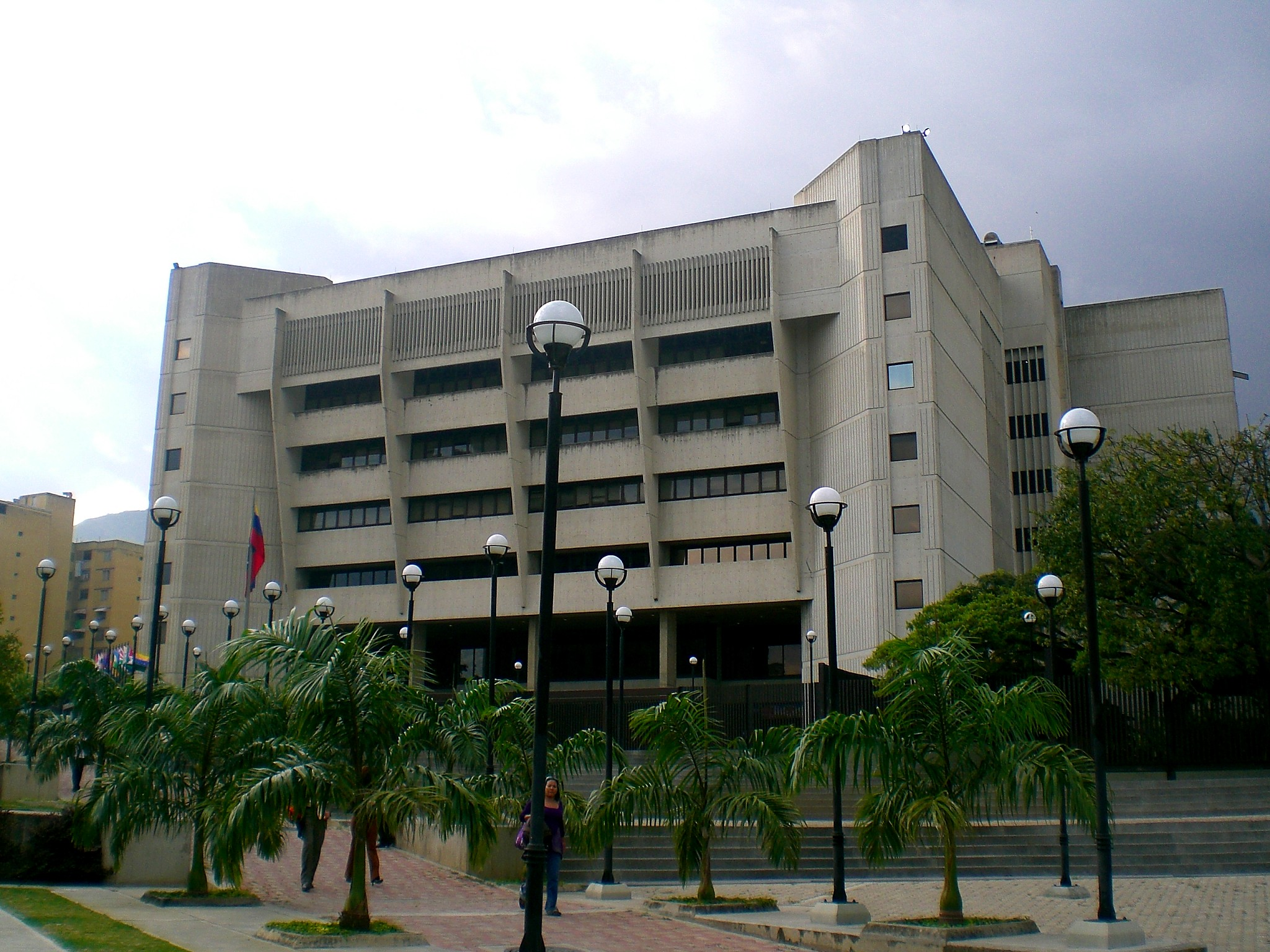
Supreme Tribunal of Justice building in Caracas

BBC journalist Vanessa Buschschlüter called the members of the court "overwhelmingly government loyalists", while El País described it as under PSUV (the ruling party, of which Maduro is president) control. The BBC stated that this process is "likely to be conducted behind closed doors" where only the TSJ members will see the tallies. The Carter Center, anticipating this move, stated that "the TSJ is another government institution, appointed by the government ... not an independent assessment". This move was seen as a means to delay the process while giving the appearance of compliance. A former member of opposition figure Juan Guaidó's cabinet told O Globo that this was done in an attempt to stall the opposition and give the results a veneer of legitimacy.

González said he would not respond to a court summons issued by the TSJ as part of its audit procedures, citing procedural irregularities and concerns for his safety and saying the summons violated due process. He has also stated that the TSJ was not authorized to perform the functions of the CNE, as that would violate constitutional separation of powers. Spain's El País wrote on 22 August that the TSJ "is controlled by the ruling party", and that the CNE president Amoroso is "a close friend of Maduro".

In accepting the TSJ case, Caryslia Rodríguez, president of the court, said that there would be a "detailed examination" of the tally sheets, according to El País. Rodríguez had been requested by another presidential candidate, Enrique Márquez to recuse herself because of "her political ties with the ruling party".

According to Efecto Cocuyo, members of Consejo de Expertos Electorales de Latinoamérica (CEELA) were guessed to be among the observers of the TSJ's verifications. Efecto Cocuyo was sceptical about the independence of CEELA, citing CEELA's description of the 2017 election for a Venezuelan constituent assembly as valid despite Smartmatic, the producer of the computerized voting system, stating its certainty that the results were manipulated and estimating a discrepancy of a million voters in the participation count.

As anticipated, after reviewing materials submitted, the Supreme Justice Tribunal (TSJ), composed of justices loyal to Maduro, on 22 August validated the CNE's statements of a win by Maduro; the opposition and other observers have characterized their ruling as invalid, stating that the high court has no constitutional authority over elections. The court stated that the opposition vote tallies were falsified; the Associated Press wrote that the Maduro administration "has claimed—without evidence—that a foreign cyberattack staged by hackers from North Macedonia delayed the vote counting on election night and publication of the disaggregated results." Jorge Rodríguez, National Assembly president, claimed that the opposition vote tallies had been forged.

NTN24 reported that on 26 August, the CNE webpage was briefly accessible, and many people were able to view the actas and verify that they coincided with what the opposition had reported on resultadosporvenezuela.com, negating the claim that the actas had been forged or falsified by the opposition, according to a photographer who videotaped the webpage while it was open.

In announcing the TSJ decision, Rodríguez said that a criminal investigation would be conducted regarding "presumably false" results that were published.

=== Allegations against Machado and González ===
Diosdado Cabello, vice-president of PSUV, and National Assembly president Rodríguez suggested two days after the election that Machado and González go to prison. Agreeing with Rodriguez and Cabello, Maduro asked authorities to apply "maximum justice" to Machado and González, accusing them of being leaders of violent groups. Costa Rica offered political asylum to opposition politicians, including González, Machado, and those hosted by the Argentine Embassy in Caracas; Machado responded that she would "continue the struggle".

On 1 August, Machado published a letter in The Wall Street Journal, stating that she had gone in to hiding "fearing for my life, my freedom, and that of my fellow countrymen from the dictatorship of Nicolás Maduro"; in the letter, she laid out the evidence she said she had from the vote tallies supporting PUD's win, and stated that Maduro had expelled witnesses from the polls, while the witnesses "protected the voter receipts with their lives throughout the night" of the elections. Machado came out of hiding to appear at the demonstration in Las Mercedes, Caracas on 3 August; she appeared again in Caracas on 17 August for the Great World Protest for the Truth. González had been in hiding for weeks as of 19 August, last seen publicly on July 30.

The Miami Herald reported that in a 19 August interview with Últimas Noticias, when Tarek Saab, Venezuela's attorney general, was asked if Machado would be charged with homicide, he responded: "At any moment, any of them could be charged and held responsible as the intellectual authors of all these events". Saab, who is under sanctions for multiple alleged offenses, is charged by human rights organizations as "being one of the key people in the regime's efforts to use the Venezuelan justice system as an instrument of political persecution". Saab held Machado and González responsible for what he said were a series of events directed from the United States. A few days before Saab's statement, the Colombian Peace & Reconciliation Foundation (Pares) had released its third report on election violence in Venezuela, stating that most of the victims during the election were "members of the main opposition parties", and that over 91% of the violent acts were committed by Venezuelan security forces.

=== González summons, arrest warrant and exile ===
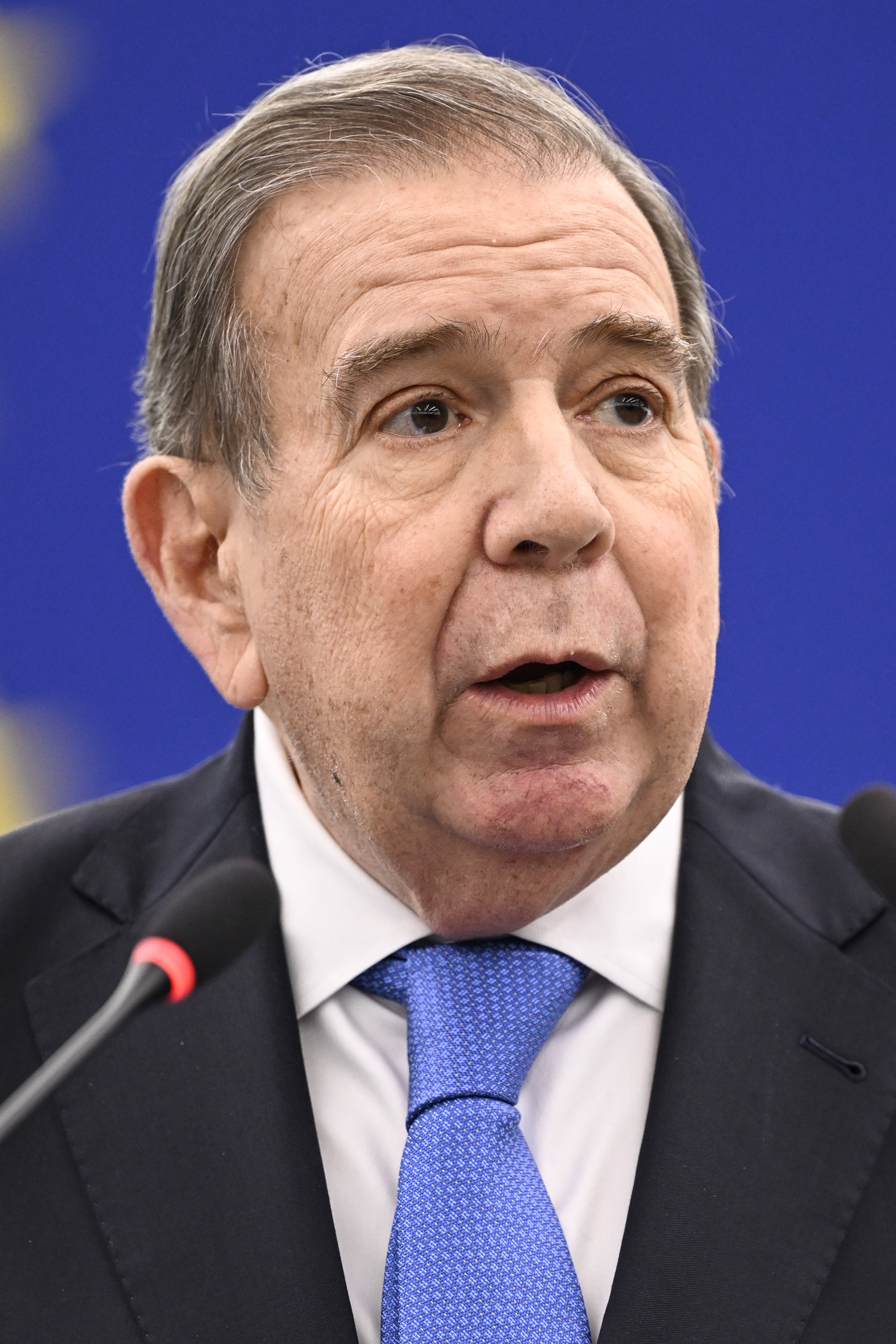
Edmundo González, then 74, in 2024

Following the TSJ ruling on 22 August, attorney general Saab told journalists that González would be called to testify in a criminal investigation of alleged electoral fraud. González was summoned to appear on 26 August on the charge of usurping the function of the CNE by uploading election records to www.resultsconvzla.com. He was also accused of forgery, instigating disobedience, conspiracy and association to commit a crime, and computer crimes. Attorney Joel García said the summons was unclear on whether González was accused or called as a witness or an expert. A second summons for the following day was issued when González, as anticipated, did not appear; if an individual fails to comply with a summons three times, an arrest warrant can be issued. He also ignored the second summons.

After ignoring a third summons, an arrest warrant was issued on 2 September for González for crimes including criminal association and conspiracy after prosecutor Luis Ernesto Dueñez Reyes "requested Gonzalez be arrested for usurpation of functions, falsification of public documents, instigation to disobey the law, conspiracy and association", according to Reuters. José Vicente Haro, González's attorney, said that the attorney general's office would not receive affidavits needed for González's defense and "explaining why González ignored three summons".

After the election, González sought refuge secretly in the Dutch Embassy through 5 September, after which he spent several days in the Spanish embassy in Caracas, and was granted asylum, leaving on a Spanish Armed Forces flight on 7 September 2024. His wife accompanied him on the flight to Madrid, where they would join a daughter who lives there.

==== Reactions to González arrest warrant ====
Machado stated that Maduro's administration had "lost all sense of reality”, and that the threat of arrest would further unite the opposition. PUD (the main opposition platform) strongly condemned the escalating political persecution aimed at González, stating that a "regime" that was unable to publish "a single acta that supported the fraudulent [election] result announced by the CNE" was able to quickly issue an arrest warrant for the winner of those elections. Haro, González's attorney, said that González is not planning to seek asylum.

On his weekly program, Maduro did not directly address the arrest warrant, but dedicated a portion of the show to González, calling him a "coward", saying that "no one is above the law", claiming González and Machado were responsible for the 2024 Venezuelan blackouts, and announcing a decree for an early Christmas with: "It already smells like Christmas and that is why this year, in homage to the combative people, I am going to decree Christmas for October 1st."

The governments of Argentina, Chile, Costa Rica, Dominican Republic, Guatemala, Paraguay, Perú, and Uruguay strongly condemned the arrest warrant. Chile called for respect for fundamental freedoms and human rights, condemning repression aimed at political opponents, joining the other seven countries that rejected the warrant as "another attempt to silence Mr. González, to ignore the will of the Venezuelan people, and constitutes political persecution", characterizing the action as a "dictatorial practice" in a country with no "separation of powers or minimum judicial guarantees and where arbitrary arrests abound".

Brazil's foreign policy advisor, Celso Amorim, stated that there was an "authoritarian escalation" in Venezuela that was "very concerning", and said an actual arrest of González would be a "political arrest". Following a phone conversation between Colombian President Petro and Brazilian President Lula, their Foreign Ministers released a statement expressing "profound concern about the arrest warrant"; Colombian Senator María Fernanda Cabal criticized Petro for not speaking more forcefully himself, asking if he "feared the dictatorship of Maduro".

Brian A. Nichols, a United States Assistant Secretary of State, denounced the warrant as "unjustified" writing that Maduro had "ordered the arrest of the democratic leader who overwhelmingly defeated him at the polls". John Kirby, White House National Security Communications Advisor, said the warrant was "just another example of Mr. Maduro's efforts to maintain power by force".

The European Union's Josep Borrell "categorically rejected[ed] the arrest warrant', writing: "Enough repression and harassment of the opposition and civil society." Italy's Foreign Ministry issued a statement strongly condemning the arrest warrant, and calling again for vote results to be published and political prisoners to be released.

The Secretary General of the OAS Luis Almagro called for the International Criminal Court to intervene, stating that the political persecution of González was "one more crime in the permanent and continuous legal logic of systematic violation of human rights in the country". The United Nations Human Rights Office denounced a "climate of fear" and persecution of people expressing "their right to political participation".

=== Reactions to TSJ ruling ===
Maduro cabinet members Saab, Yván Gil and Freddy Ñáñez were laudatory of the 22 August TSJ ruling; Saab called it historic, Gil said it "closes a chapter in Venezuela's 28 July electoral process", and Ñáñez said it was a historic "happy ending". Andrés Izarra, active during the Hugo Chávez administration and a former member of Maduro's cabinet, criticized the decision as a "coup".

Brazil, Colombia and Mexico released a joint statement on 8 August that distanced themselves from the TSJ audit, writing that "CNE has the legal mandate to transparently publish electoral results", while calling again for the release of the vote tallies. Following the 22 August TSJ ruling, Mexican president Lopez Obrador said he would comment on who had won the election after vote tallies were published. Brazilian president Lula and Colombian president Petro, Maduro allies, had no immediate response on the TSJ ruling, but on 24 August warned Venezuelans to "avoid resorting to acts of violence and repression" and called again for vote tallies to be published.

Chile's left-wing president Gabriel Boric did not recognize the TSJ ruling, and accused the court of "consolidating the fraud", in an election stolen by a "dictatorship that ... represses those who think differently and is indifferent to the largest exile in the world". Guatemala's president Bernardo Arévalo, characterized as center-left by The Guardian, joined Boric in the criticism from the left, calling the results a fraud in an "indisputable" Venezuelan crisis. Luis Lacalle Pou, president of Uruguay, called the decision a confirmation of fraud from "a dictatorship that closes all doors to an institutional and democratic life for its people". Santiago Peña, Paraguayan president, called the TSJ decision "unacceptable" by ratifying "results that do not reflect the will of the Venezuelan people". Jorge Quiroga, former Bolivian president, stated: "Democracy is being buried in Venezuela" in a "blow against popular sovereignty". Former Colombian presidents rejected the TSJ ruling: Juan Manuel Santos called it a "hoax" and Iván Duque called it a "blow" to the "millions of citizens who yearn for change and to the brave electoral witnesses who demonstrated through the minutes that Edmundo González won by 30 points". Guillermo Lasso, former president of Ecuador, said he was not surprised by the TSJ ruling, that was "lacking impartiality, independence and credibility" intending to "consolidate the electoral fraud".

Bolivian president Luis Arce and former president Evo Morales supported the TSJ decision and congratulated Maduro: Arce criticized interference with "democratic institutions of the Bolivarian Republic of Venezuela" and Morales emphasized the "clear, definitive and unappealable" TSJ ruling.

Other Latin American leaders rejected the TSJ ruling, along with the US; in a joint statement, Argentina, Costa Rica, Chile, the Dominican Republic, Ecuador, Guatemala, Panama, Paraguay, and Peru joined the US in calling for an independent vote audit.

The European Union High Representative for Foreign Affairs Josep Borrell reiterated that the EU would not recognize Maduro without electoral records. The Council of the European Union issued a 25 August statement of concern that evidence was lacking from the CNE—"the body legally and constitutionally responsible for the transparent and detailed publication of the official electoral results"—reiterating the previous UN position. The Council statement called for those responsible for human rights violations to be investigated and prosecuted.

United Nations Secretary General António Guterres noted that the TSJ ruling is contested. Before the TSJ ruling, the UN Fact Finding Mission on Venezuela had stated that both the TSJ and the CNE were "lack[ing] impartiality and independence" and had participated in the "repressive machinery of the State"; members of the mission noted the involvement of both Justice Caryslia Rodríguez and the CNE president Amoroso with the ruling party, PSUV.

== Effects ==
=== Ongoing censorship ===
A few hours after publication of Machado's 1 August letter in The Wall Street Journal, according to VE Sin Filtro, that newspaper was blocked by some providers in Venezuela.

On 8 August, Maduro ordered that X (formerly Twitter) be blocked for ten days in Venezuela; at 3 pm Venezuelan time, VE Sin Filtro announced the block was effective.

=== Legislative changes ===
The legislature passed a new law "to more tightly regulate non-governmental organizations" (NGOs) and their funding.

Known as the Law on the supervision, regulation, action and financing of non-governmental and related organizations (Spanish: Ley de fiscalización, regularización, actuación y financiamiento de las organizaciones no gubernamentales y afines) it was passed in the context of the post-election climate of arbitrary arrests. The law was first proposed in 2023 by Diosdado Cabello; it distinguishes foreign from Venezuelan donors but does not explain the consequences to NGOs that receive donations from foreign sources. The Maduro administration has held the position that NGOs are a "facade for the financing of terrorist actions".

Ali Daniels, an advocate for legal rights, told Reuters: "In the end what they want is to repress NGOs with this bill, which forms part of the repressive wave following July 28 and seeks to definitively clamp down on civic space." Volker Türk, the United Nations High Commissioner for Human Rights, characterized it as among "laws that undermine civic and democratic space in the country".

=== Emigration crisis ===
Following on the repression and crackdown on dissent by the Maduro administration, a Meganálisis poll of 1,007 people from 8 August to 11 August indicated that over 40% of Venezuelans intended to leave the country soon. According to the poll, 600,000 Venezuelans intended to emigrate by mid-September, and another 930,000 hoped to emigrate by December, joining the already 7.7 million in the Venezuelan diaspora.

Concerns about another Venezuelan refugee crisis emerged since the election; millions of people who had expected the election to lead to a peaceful transition of power were likely to flee to countries that had already received large numbers of Venezuelan immigrants. Such a large migration was expected to exacerbate the border crisis in the US and to significantly affect other countries in Latin America.

=== Public-sector employees dismissed ===
Mass layoffs of employees for political reasons were reported by union leaders at state-owned or controlled companies including Venezolana de Televisión (television station), PDVSA (oil company), Corpoelec (power company conglomerate) and others; El País wrote that individuals were fired "as the top management became aware of the political positions of many workers who believe the allegations of electoral fraud".

The Venezuelan SNTP (Syndicate of National Press Workers) reported that complaints had been filed from dozens of employees who said that they had been fired for liking Machado's WhatsApp posts. Le Monde wrote that Carmela Longo, a journalist at the "pro-government" newspaper Últimas Noticias said she was fired shortly before she was arrested; she was charged with terrorism, and released on 26 August.

Union representatives and others told Reuters that after employees had been forced to attend pro-Maduro rallies, there were more than 100 forced resignations because of political views at PDVSA among those holding administrative positions, and more in the oil ministry and among workers in the production sector.

=== Passports voided ===
Passports of some members of the opposition, activists, journalists, and others were revoked.

Andrés Villavicencio, an attorney who served as a poll watcher, told The Wall Street Journal that masked men came to his home after the election, his passport was voided although its expiry date was 2031, and fearing arrest, he crossed into Colombia without documents and went into exile in Spain.

Friends of professor and human rights worker Edni López stated that she disappeared from the airport after being told her passport was expired. López' supporters believed that her passport was valid. Yendri Velásquez, an LGBT activist, was told at the airport his passport was not valid, and was detained for six hours, after which he was released. According to the BBC and Associated Press, these passport refusals were common.

=== Financial ===
Bloomberg reported that Maduro's costly campaign spending on advertising and events caused the Central Bank of Venezuela to sell stockpiled US dollars, leading the parallel market for the Venezuelan bolívar to trade weaker than the official market and threatening to reignite an inflationary cycle. Bloomberg stated: "In the run-up to the vote, Maduro covered the capital in ads, billboards and murals, and staged almost daily campaign events across the country that often included musical acts and elaborate production", such that the demand for US dollars was greater than supply, "reviving a parallel market used to skirt supply shortages and controls".

== Transition proposals ==
Negotiated peaceful transition of power proposals include an exit deal and power-sharing; repeating the election was also proposed.

=== How Maduro maintains power ===
Describing the fear since Operation Tun Tun was initiated after the election, a 26 August article in The Guardian stated: "Many experts believe that ... Maduro will manage to ride out the latest threat to his 11-year rule" and "some compare [the rights violations] to those committed under the Chilean dictator Augusto Pinochet".

To stop opposition within the military and his own government, Maduro divided his security personnel into fragmented units. This tactic, known as "coup proofing", makes consolidating power within ranks more challenging. In addition to the branches of the armed forces, which may spy on each other, the colectivos—armed groups of civilians supported by the Maduro administration—and several different intelligence services help maintain Maduro's power. Jack Nicas, writes for The New York Times that the government has also "purchased loyalty by giving senior military officers high-paying jobs or control of state industries". Harold Trinkunas, who specializes in Venezuelan politics and military at Stanford University, told The Guardian it was likely Maduro would maintain power because of his "grip over the armed forces"—a position echoed by Antonio Maria Delgado writing in the Miami Herald that Defense Minister Vladimir Padrino "holds the Venezuelan regime together" with assistance from Cuba. Nicas agreed that security forces are a determining factor in whether Maduro steps down, as does Tim Padgett, a journalist covering Latin America for more than 30 years, who states that "allies like Cuba and Russia are lending their ruthless intelligence services to help Maduro detect any signs of betrayal" in the armed forces.

Joshua Goodman wrote for the Associated Press that "so long as Maduro has the support of the armed forces and powerful allies like Russia and China", it is "unrealistic" to think other countries can play a significant role. Laureano Perez Izquierdo wrote in Infobae on 25 August that the support of Russia's Vladimir Putin, similar to his support of the Al-Assad family in Syria, helps maintain Maduro in power, stating: "Like Al-Assad, Maduro has the unwavering support of Russia and China", along with "Cuba, which penetrated all the structures of [Venezuelan] government and defense". Perez Izquierdo concludes that votes for González will not alter Putin's stance.

Speculation that Maduro may seek exile in Cuba or Turkey has advanced, but there has been no indication Maduro intends to step down. In the context of exit negotiations, Nora Gamez Torres writing for the Miami Herald also notes that, with the support of Russia, China and Cuba, Maduro "remains defiant".

Writing for Foreign Policy, Geoff Ramsey and Jason Marczak stated that Maduro "looks weaker than at any point" recently, adding that his repressive moves "do not appear to be the actions of a strongman who feels safe and secure in his position". Speaking the day before the rally scheduled for the one-month anniversary of the election, Machado told Reuters that the opposition had a strategy, and indicated that with peaceful protest, international pressure, and "coordination between internal and external forces", Maduro's removal from power was possible notwithstanding support from a "very reduced group of high-ranking soldiers" and the "control of magistrates".

==== Maduro cabinet shuffle ====
Roman Lejtman wrote in Infobae on 18 August that, while the US had been negotiating with National Assembly President Jorge Rodríguez, Maduro may have replaced him with Padrino and Diosdado Cabello.

On 27 August, Maduro announced he would make cabinet changes, saying "we are putting together a new team which will help us transition everything for this era, open new paths ..."

Maduro named Cabello the new Minister of Popular Power of the Interior, Justice and Peace, among other changes. In relation to the events of the 2024 election, this puts Cabello in position to pursue the "consequent persecution of all types of dissidence in Venezuela", according to Infobae, and put him in charge of Identification, Migration and Immigration along with all security forces and law enforcement.

With respect to the election, and Maduro's call for Machado and González to be imprisoned, Cabello has stated: "Whoever attacks the institutions, whoever attacks our people must assume their responsibility. Enough is enough."

Vladimir Padrino remained in the Defense Ministry, while Delcy Rodriguez, Vice President, also assumed the Petroleum Ministry.

According to Agence France-Press, "what happens next may depend on whether the international community can exert sufficient pressure on Maduro".

=== Opposition proposal: peaceful, negotiated transition ===
González had expressed willingness to negotiate a transfer of power with Maduro, which included not persecuting his party and giving it a place in the National Assembly.

Machado said the opposition was willing to negotiate for Maduro to recognize González's win, according to Nora Gámez Torres writing in the Miami Herald on 8 August. Machado presented four negotiating points:

1. Recognize the 28 July results, in
2. an "orderly and stable democratic transition" with
3. "guarantees, safeguards, and incentives" for a rapid outcome that
4. "has to be a negotiation in which the people of Venezuela, the leaders that the people of Venezuela trust and the sectors of civil society are represented".

Gámez Torres wrote that "there is no evidence that the Maduro regime is willing to negotiate with the opposition", adding that he "has threatened to jail" them. Former Colombian vice-president Francisco Santos Calderón opined that, with respect to the TSJ audit, "Maduro would use the legal maneuver to validate fake results presented by the electoral council, discredit the data presented by the opposition and eventually arrest Gonzalez and Machado".

Machado welcomed the efforts by Brazil and Colombia, but said the electoral victory was non-negotiable and the opposition would not agree to power-sharing.

=== Brazil, Colombia proposal: repeat election ===
Brazilian president Lula and Colombian president Petro, leftist allies of Maduro who had been pressing him to release the vote tallies, proposed instead on 15 August that the election should be repeated—Venezuelan law provides for that possibility if an election is annulled. At the same time, Lula made his strongest criticism of Maduro since the election, stating that the Venezuela administration has an "authoritarian slant" and is "a very unpleasant regime", while again calling for Maduro to release the vote tallies.

The opposition and the Maduro government each rejected the idea—both stating they had already won.

US President Biden seemed to have endorsed the proposal, but White House spokespersons later seemed to suggest he was referring to something else.

Mexican President López stated on 15 August that he did not consider the proposal by Brazil and Colombia to be "prudent", that he had not spoken with the presidents of those countries since 1 August, and that he had no plans to continue dialogue with them until the TSJ issues a ruling; he did not endorse Maduro as the winner of the election, but criticized those countries and organizations that have declared that González won, adding that Mexico is "not in favor of one or the other".

=== US positions: amnesty or sanctions ===
On 19 July 2024, Elliott Abrams, diplomat and former special representative of the Trump administration for Venezuela, suggested that the United States should offer amnesty to Maduro.

The US denied an 11 August report in The Wall Street Journal that it had offered Maduro amnesty in exchange for him conceding the election; a senior US official told the Miami Herald that the US "has not offered Nicolás Maduro and his aides any form of amnesty to leave power in Venezuela, but is open to all possibilities", and White House Press Secretary Karine Jean-Pierre confirmed the denial.

A 10 August article in The Washington Post stated that the Biden administration was deferring to the lead of the three presidents in Brazil, Colombia and Mexico; unnamed administration sources said there was time for other strategies before the January 2025 inauguration, but the near-term focus was on providing an exit strategy rather than more forceful options like sanctions. Florida Senator Marco Rubio and other critics said this strategy was empowering Maduro and allowing him to continue repression.

On 18 August, an unnamed member of the Biden administration stated that negotiations with Maduro were not progressing because Maduro won't accept mention of defeat, and "does not want to negotiate twice" (once now and once after the US presidential elections), according to Infobae in an article that also stated Maduro intends to "delay the entire political process until after the elections in the United States". White House sources told Infobae that sanctions aimed at individuals in the military and security forces were being studied. Ramsey and Maczak wrote on 27 August that the Biden Administration was "keeping its cards close", seeking to avoid seeing Maduro draw closer to Russia and China; they wrote that after having provided exemptions from existing sanctions that allowed oil to keep flowing from Venezuela, the US was taking it slow on imposing more sanctions.

On 12 September, the United States Department of the Treasury sanctioned 16 individuals who are linked to the election fraud. Among the individuals who are sanctioned by the Department of the Treasury are senior figures in the TSJ, CNE, and the military including the prominent names such as Caryslia Rodríguez, Domingo Antonio Hernández Larez, and others.

=== Power-sharing proposals ===
Venezuelan economist and former advisor to the National Assembly Francisco Rodríguez argued in favor of a peaceful transition of power to be initiated via a power-sharing agreement similar to that of the 1989 Polish Round Table Agreement and Contract Sejm in Poland. Using the March 2020 US proposal "Democratic Transition Framework for Venezuela" as a starting point, he suggested that Maduro would symbolically retain the presidency, Maduro's supporters would retain the security and police ministries, and the opposition would have a prime minister and the rest of the cabinet.

On 15 August, Brazilian president Lula and Colombian president Petro proposed power-sharing. Maduro and the opposition rejected the proposal.
