= Nogal =

Nogal may refer to:

== Places ==
- Nogal, New Mexico
- Nugal, Somalia

== People ==
- Nogal (surname), a family name
