= 2024 Venezuelan presidential election protests =

- Part of the protests against Nicolás Maduro, 2024 Venezuelan political crisis, Gen Z protests, and the aftermath of the 2024 Venezuelan presidential election
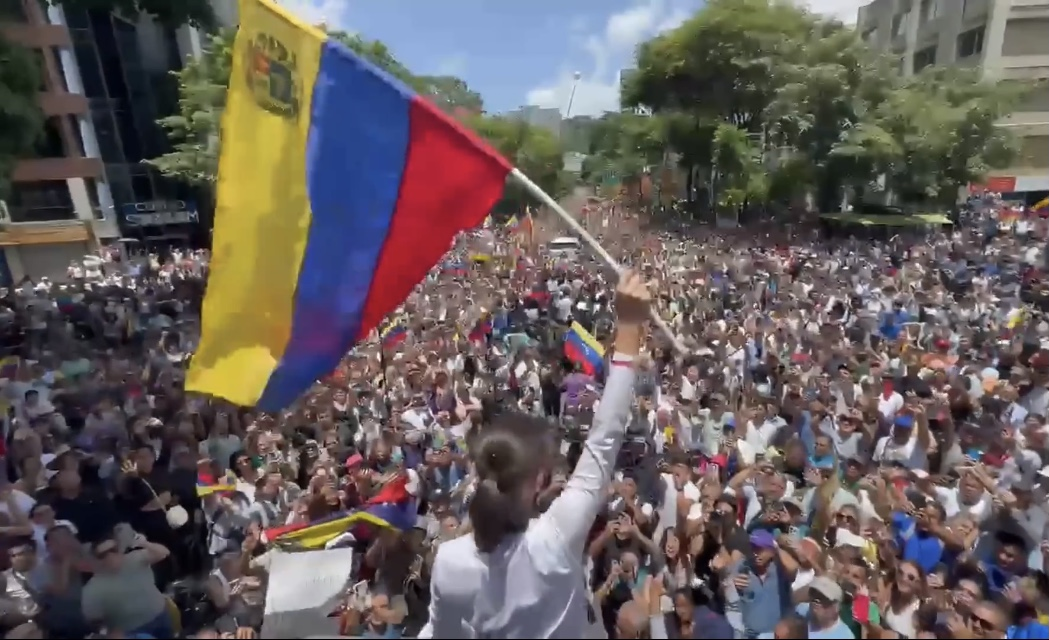
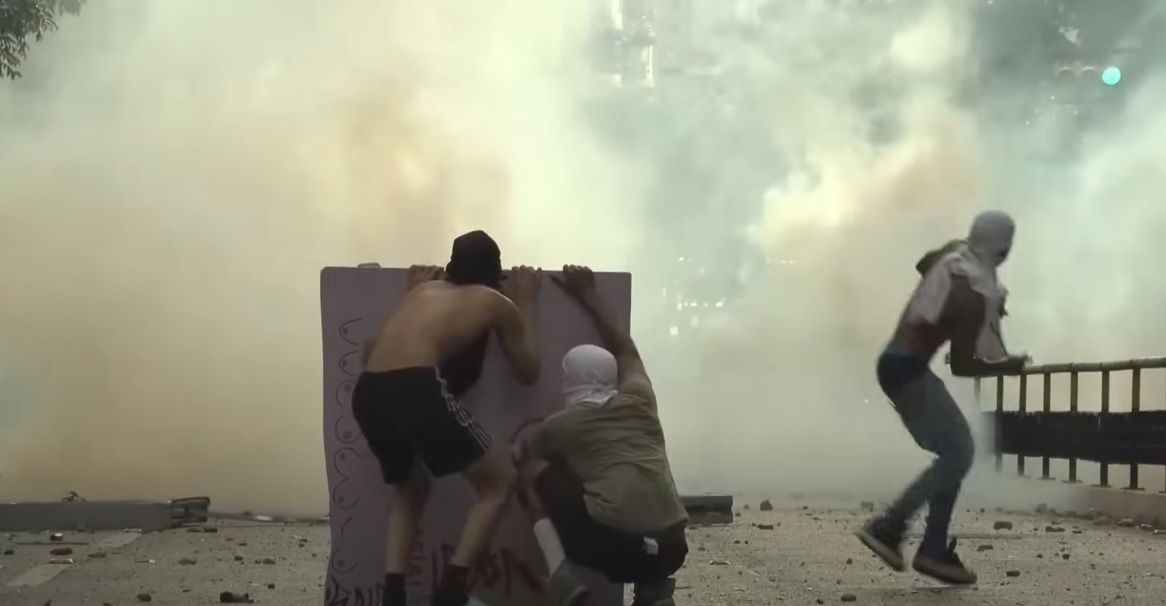
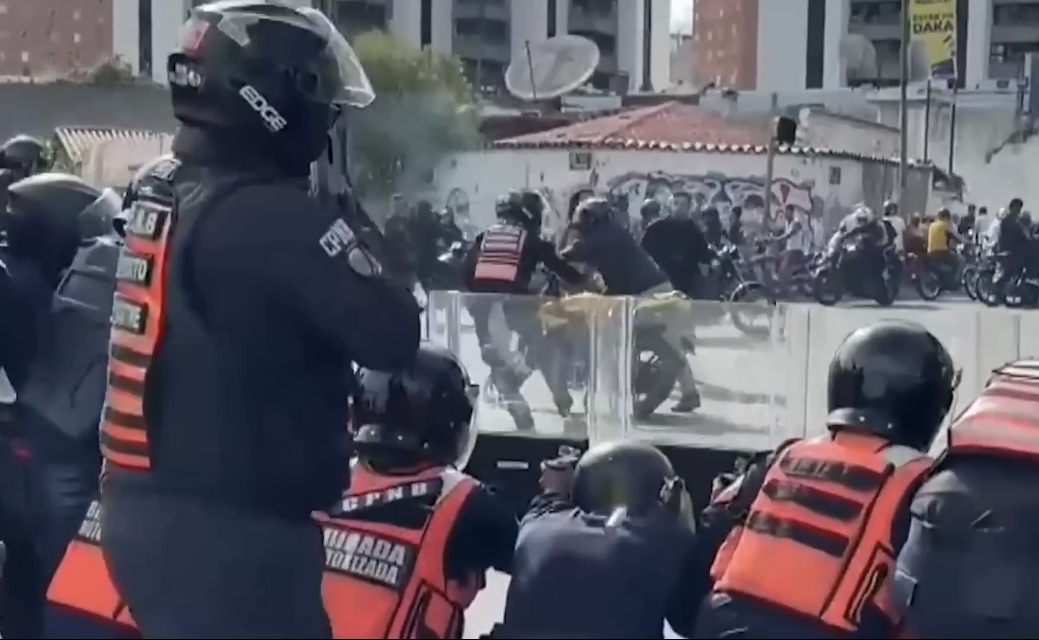
- Protests following 2024 presidential election
- Date: 28 July 2024 – 10 January 2025 (5 months, 1 week and 6 days)
- Location: Venezuela
- Caused by: Election fraud in the 2024 Venezuelan presidential election; Ongoing political and social crisis in Venezuela; Corruption and authoritarianism
- Goals: Recognition of Nicolás Maduro's loss in the 2024 Venezuelan presidential election, release of complete and transparent vote tallies, and transfer of power to President-elect Edmundo González Urrutia by the outgoing administration; Dissolution of the PSUV administration; Economic and political reforms; Resolution of the crisis in Venezuela
- Result: Protests quelled

Parties
(Venezuela) Venezuelan opposition	Venezuelan government; Bolivarian National Armed Forces of Venezuela; Bolivarian National Police

Lead figures
María Corina Machado (Leader of Opposition); Edmundo González (President-elect of Venezuela claimed by opposition)	Nicolás Maduro (President of Venezuela claimed by government)

Casualties
- Deaths: 23

Protests followed the 2024 Venezuelan presidential election on 28 July, in response to voter fraud and other irregularities during the election cycle, as part of the 2024 Venezuelan political crisis. The election and unrest occurred in the context of the ongoing crisis in Venezuela.

Statistical analyses by multiple organizations indicated that the election was won convincingly by Edmundo Gonzalez but those results have not been recognized by incumbent Nicolás Maduro; the Democratic Unitary Platform (PUD), an alliance of opposition parties, released vote tallies at the precinct level indicating that González won by a wide margin, while the government-controlled National Electoral Council (CNE) announced an unsubstantiated result, without any precinct-level tallies, stating Maduro won. Both candidates claimed victory, while many countries recognized González as the winner.

Demonstrations to uphold the results of the election, along with vigils for political prisoners, occurred worldwide after the July election. Spontaneous protests broke out immediately after the election, while later rallies were organized by the Venezuelan opposition; Maduro claimed the opposition was encouraging a coup and has charged demonstraters with terrorism, while initiating an unprecedented crackdown. Maduro's security forces have gone door-to-door seeking to arrest protesters, poll workers and members of the opposition in what Maduro has referred to as Operation Tun Tun, and armed bands of Maduro supporters known as colectivos have joined security forces in repressing dissent. As of 14 August 2024, at least 2,200 persons are reported to have been arrested, and 25 killed; Maduro has announced plans to continue to seek the arrest of dissenters, and to rehabilitate two prisons to house those detained.

The repression has been widely condemned by international groups; Amnesty International penned an open letter requesting urgent action from the International Criminal Court (ICC), on the basis of an ongoing ICC investigation of possible crimes against humanity under Maduro's regime.

== Background ==
The election and protests occurred amid the Venezuelan crisis – ongoing since 2010 – which resulted in the largest peacetime exodus in history culminating in 7.7 million refugees in the Venezuelan diaspora from the Venezuelan refugee crisis according to the United Nations High Commissioner for Refugees.

Following Elvis Amoroso's statements from the CNE claiming Maduro's victory in the early hours of 29 July, the majority opposition—organized around María Corina Machado and the Democratic Unitary Platform candidate, Edmundo González—and many countries denounced electoral fraud and have either recognized Gonzalez as president-elect or at a minimum called for audits.

Machado stated that the PUD had obtained voter tally sheets that showed González winning in a landslide. After forensic examination of substantive evidence given by the Venezuelan opposition, according to a CNN report, a Maduro victory was considered a "statistical improbability" by statisticians and political scientists. The U.S. and several Latin American governments recognized Edmundo González as the winner.

== Chronology ==
During the month of July, the Venezuelan Observatory of Social Conflict (OVCS: Observatorio Venezolano de Conflictividad Social) documented 1,311 protests throughout Venezuela; 70% were on 29 or 30 July. OVCS said most of the protests occurred in poor areas, and involved "harassment, arbitrary arrests, threats and political retaliation against leaders and sympathizers of opposition political parties".

=== 2024 ===
==== 28 July: Election day ====
On 28 July 2024, the day of the election, Venezuelans in the Brazilian cities, Pacaraima, Boa Vista, and São Paulo, demonstrated against Maduro. In São Paulo, hundreds of Venezuelan migrants participated in a demonstration in defense of democracy and calling for freedom. On the same day, Julio Valerio García, a citizen of Táchira, was shot dead by a group of motorcyclists. There were also four injured that day.

Neither Machado nor González called for protests, but instead asked people to be present at the voting centers until they had records of the votes cast.

On 28 July, which would have been the 70th birthday of Hugo Chávez, nine statues of him were brought down by protesters.

==== 29 July: After government announcement of results ====
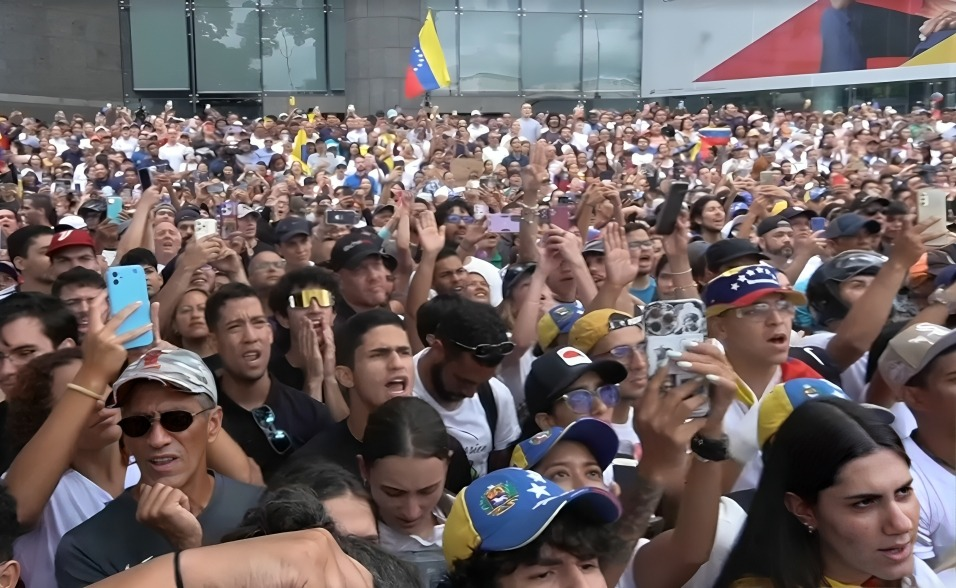
Protesters took to the street of Caracas one day after the unilateral announcement from CNE

On 29 July, there were cacerolazos (pot banging as a form of protest) throughout Caracas. The protests began around noon; in Caracas, demonstrations were reported in Isaías Medina Angarita in Catia, Ruperto Lugo and Ruiz Pineda, as well as on the Caracas-La Guaira highway; in Aragua, they were reported in Cagua; in a sector of the state of Falcón, people also took to the streets.

Protests were reported in various popular areas of the capital, especially in several sectors of Petare such as the San Blas or La Dolorita neighborhoods. A strong police presence was also reported in the capital.

Public demonstrations against Venezuela's government were registered in several foreign cities that have a strong presence of Venezuelan refugees.

In Margarita Island, hundreds of civilians occupied 4 de Mayo Avenue in Porlamar, tearing down Maduro's political banners. The Bolivarian National Police and the National Guard approached the site to repress the protesters. Protests continued on La Auyama Avenue as protesters tried to tear down a statue of Hugo Chávez before being intercepted again by national officials, who fired pellets and tear gas. The protesters responded with stones, sticks and Molotov cocktails.

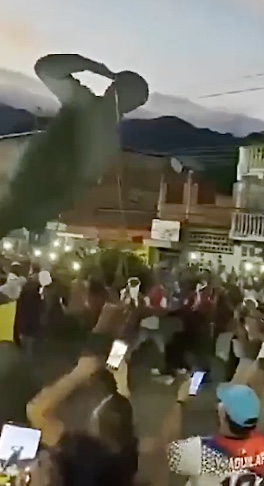
Statue of Hugo Chávez being pulled down in Mariara, Carabobo

Maduro campaign posters were torn down throughout the country. In Coro, some protesters tore down a statue which depicted the late president Hugo Chávez. The toppling of statues of Chávez trended nationwide, as numerous Bolivarian propaganda posters and murals were torn down in other cities and towns and numerous other statues were torn down across the country. The Caracas–La Guaira highway was blocked by protesters from the El Limón sector.

Europa Press reported protests in Petare, Altamira, Chacaíto, Bellas Artes, La Vega, El Valle, Catia, and La Candelaria, as well as concentrations on the Petare–Guarenas highway, specifically in the parish of Caucagüita in the Sucre Municipality, Miranda state.

Maduro blamed the comanditos (civilian opposition groups) for the protests of 29 July, threatening to jail them, and accused the United States of organizing the protests, with no evidence to support his claim. He called for all Chavistas to go out to the streets on the morning of 30 July, in all states and cities of the country, to "defend peace".

According to the Venezuelan Observatory of Social Conflict (OVCS), 183 protests were recorded in 20 of the 23 states, and in some of them 5 statues of Hugo Chávez were torn down or destroyed.

During the 29 July protests, 2 people were killed (including a 15-year-old boy), 7 protesters were injured, and there were 3 unconfirmed gunshot-related deaths. The Penal Forum issued a report where it counted 6 dead (among them a minor of 15 years of age), 132 wounded, 50 detained in different sectors of the country and three unconfirmed deaths by gunshots.

==== 30 July: Mobilization to the United Nations offices ====
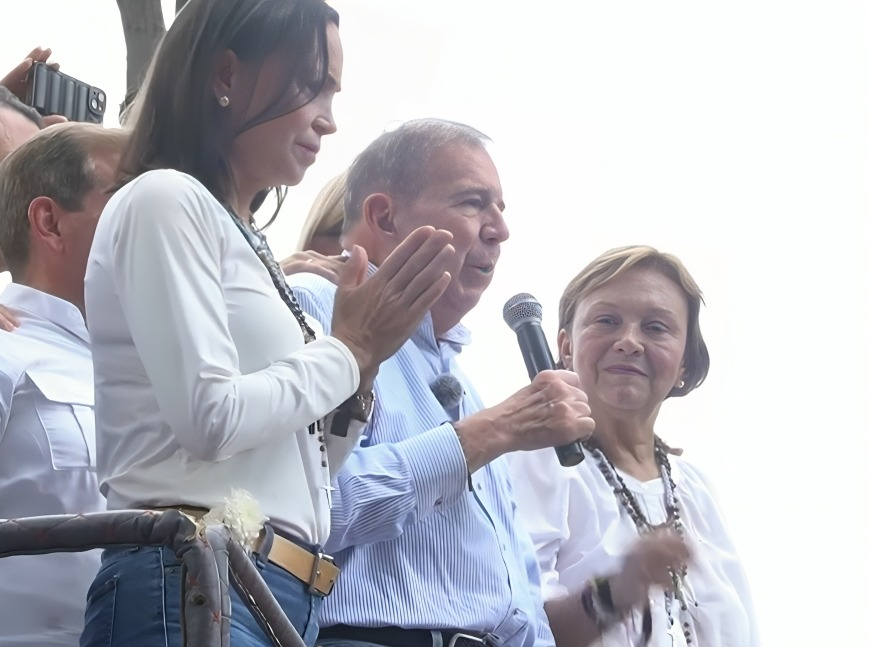
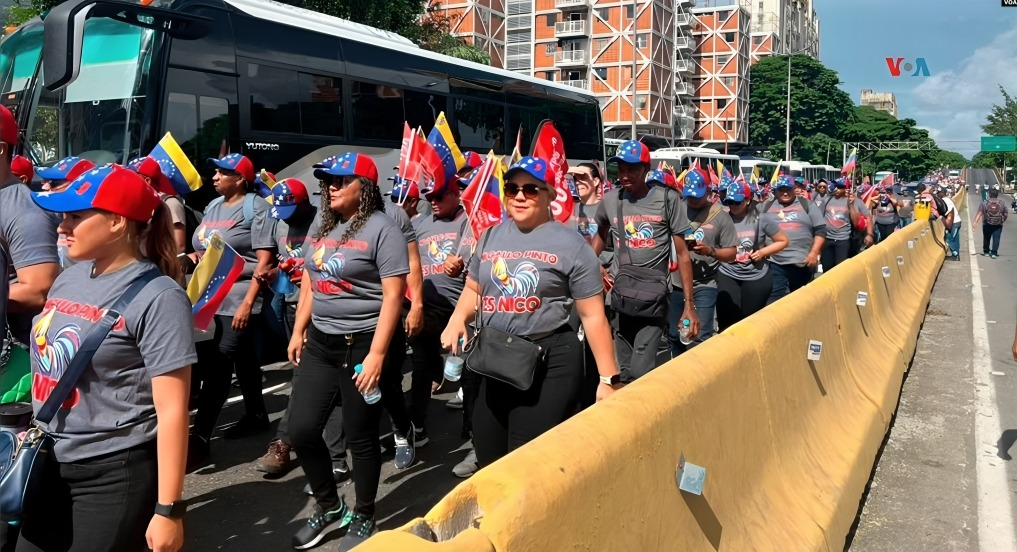
a) María Corina Machado with Edmundo González and his wife addressing the nation in front of the United Nations Development Programme office in Caracas
b) Pro-government protesters in Caracas

The Unitary Platform called for a people's mobilization in front of the United Nations Development Programme office in Caracas to defend their election victory and where both Machado and González addressed the gathering. Citizen assemblies were held in other cities, including Barquisimeto, Valencia, Maracay, San Fernando de Apure, and Los Teques.

Machado and González, from the demonstration in Los Palos Grandes, Caracas, announced that they had recovered and digitalized 80% of the vote tallies.

The Venezuelan National Guard dispersed the attendees with tear gas bombs. Colectivos joined state security agencies in the repression against protesters. In Punto Fijo, protesters set fire to the Carirubana mayor's office and the PSUV regional headquarters at midnight. On the same night, armed militia group Tren del Llano was reported to be involved in a gun fight with the police, military, and the Colectivos in Valle de la Pascua, Guarico state.

Protests continued in different parts of the country. The Venezuelan Armed Forces expressed "absolute loyalty and unconditional support" to Nicolás Maduro, according to the Venezuelan Minister of Defense, general-in-chief and ally of Chavismo, Vladimir Padrino López. Until late at night, clashes with firearms between military, police and colectivos, against civilians and armed groups in Petare were reported. By 30 July, a total of 12 people had died and more than 750 were arrested.

==== 31 July: Detainees increase ====
Maduro filed an appeal for constitutional protection before the Electoral Chamber of the Supreme Tribunal of Justice (TSJ), with the intention of legitimizing the election results in his favor. This action has been strongly criticized by the opposition, amid growing tensions and widespread condemnation of electoral fraud by the national and international community. Likewise, the TSJ has been criticized for its lack of independence and its closeness to the Maduro regime.

Tarek William Saab announced at a press conference that the number of detainees rose to 1,062, calling opposition protesters "terrorists." He also stated the possibility of requesting an arrest warrant against "intellectual authors" in the demonstrations. The attorney general stated that protesters have simulated "punishable acts" during the protests and declared that the wounds are simulated with "ketchup" by the protesters themselves.

==== 1–8 August: Machado in hiding ====
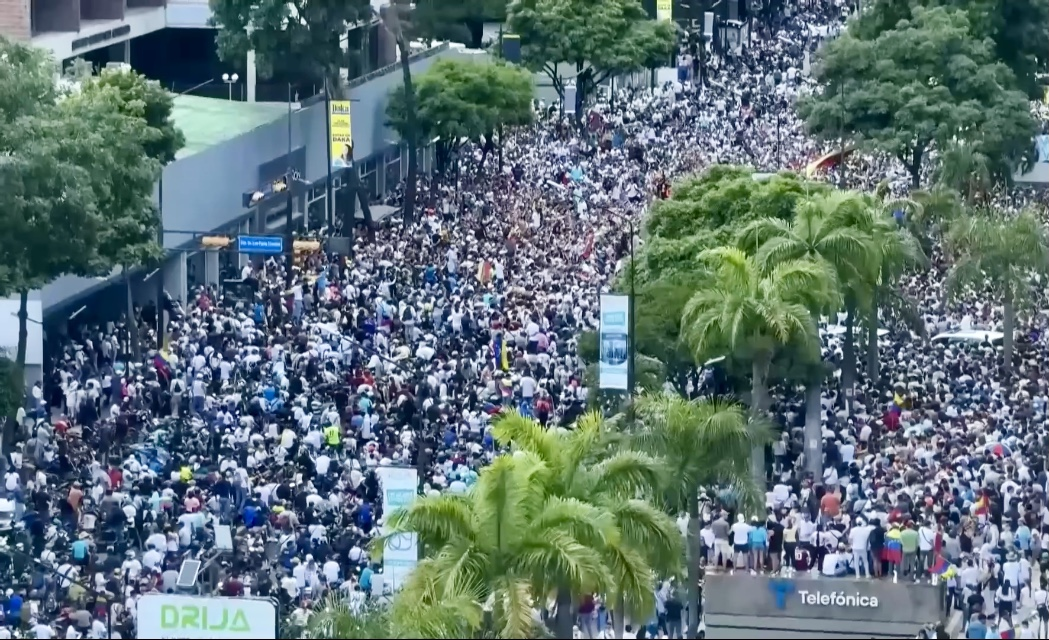
Protesters in Caracas on 3 August

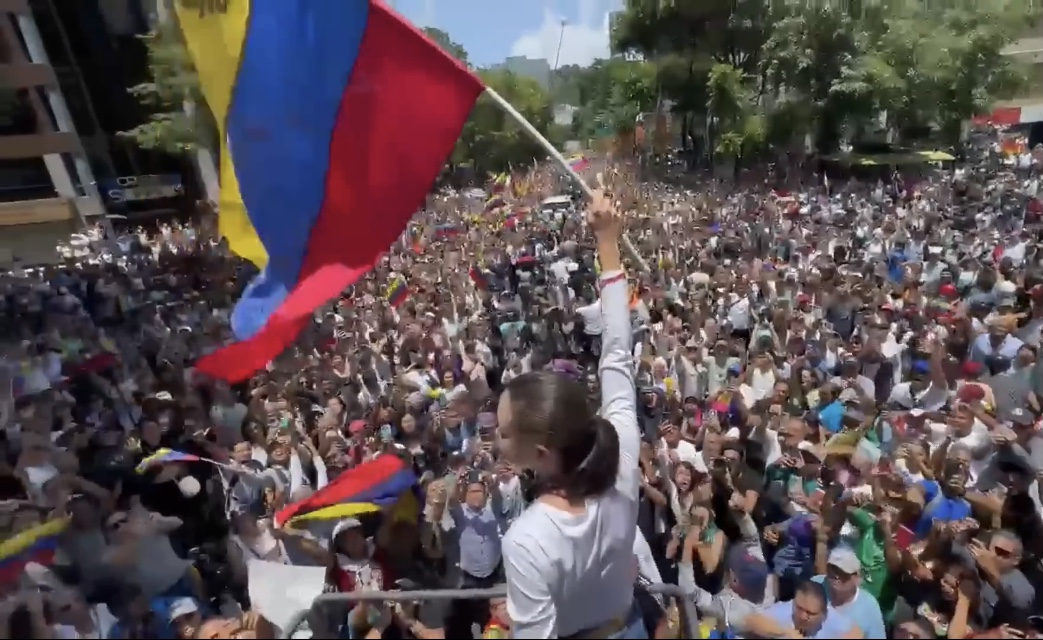
Machado addressing 3 August demonstration in Las Mercedes, Caracas

On 1 August, Machado published a letter in The Wall Street Journal, stating that she had gone in to hiding "fearing for my life, my freedom, and that of my fellow countrymen from the dictatorship of Nicolás Maduro"; in the letter, she laid out the evidence she said she had from the vote tallies supporting PUD's win, and stated that Maduro had expelled witnesses from the polls, while the witnesses "protected the voter receipts with their lives throughout the night" of the elections.

The Unitary Platform called for a display of support for the election result by families throughout the country despite repression and arrests of demonstrators.

Machado came out of hiding to appear at the demonstration in Las Mercedes, Caracas on 3 August. Demonstrations were held in other cities throughout Venezuela and abroad in Madrid, Miami, Bogotá, and Buenos Aires.

On the same date, international hacker group Anonymous declared cyberwarfare against the Venezuelan government. It was reported that the group had hacked 325 government sites in one day as well as launching a doxing campaign against Chavista officials. Among the hacked websites, Anonymous infiltrated the website of the presidency and Cuerpo de Investigaciones Científicas, Penales y Criminalísticas (CICPC) along with a database that belonged to the PSUV.

The Unitary Platform called for a candlelight vigil at the Plaza Los Palos Grandes in Chacao, Miranda on 8 August to demand the release of political prisoners who have been detained since 28 July.

==== 17 August: Great World Protest for the Truth ====
Within Venezuela and in cities across the world, Venezuelans demonstrated on 17 August in support of the opposition's claim to González's election win. Machado had called for the rally—the Great World Protest for the Truth (Gran Protesta Mundial por la Verdad)—to demonstrate "respect for popular sovereignty" and reinforce the 28 July victory.

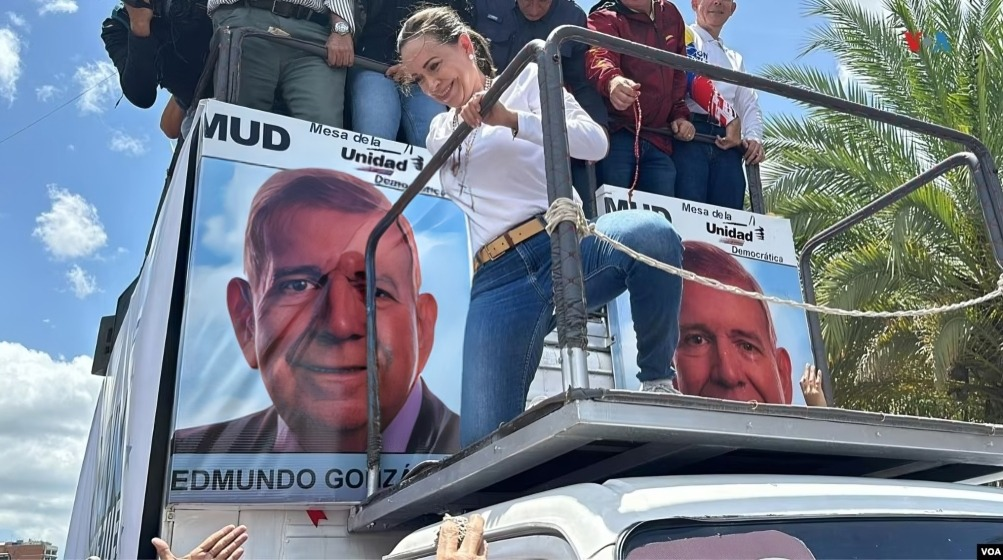
Machado on the campaign truck – adapted for rallies with a raised platform for speakers – with a photo of González, on 3 August. Following the rally, the campaign command denounced that the truck was confiscated and towed away by the Bolivarian National Police.

In Caracas, the opposition demonstration was centered near Petare, in front of the Centro Comercial Lider mall in the El Marqués urbanization. AFP reported that, early in the day, a "heavy security presence was taking shape" and that "two National Guard armored vehicles backed by about 40 motorcycle-mounted troops" were controlling access to Petare. NTN24 wrote that Petare, once a "Chavista bastion" that had become a neighborhood of "fierce" resistance to the government-announced election results, had been "militarized" to prevent the demonstrations that had emanated from Petare on 30 July, and that similar military presence was evident in other areas of Caracas.

Elsewhere in Venezuela, tear gas was used early in the day to disperse demonstrations in Maracay. In Zulia, witnesses reported that priest Elvis Cabarca was detained while leading a group praying the Rosary within a chapel. Hundreds of people protested in Barquisimeto, Maracaibo, San Cristóbal and Valencia.

Demonstrators in Caracas chanted "we are not afraid!" in response to Maduro's crackdown on dissent, Operation Tun Tun, with mass arrests that generated fear. A 52-year-old protestor told Reuters: "We have already been through the worst, we don't have any more fear. My daughter died because there were no medical supplies in the university hospital. I have nothing to lose, but I want a future for my grandchildren."

Under Maduro's threat to arrest opposition leaders, Machado came out of hiding, and stated on X, "Now comes a new stage. We have to stand firm and united. They try to scare us, to divide us, to paralyze us, but they cannot."

With more than 7.7 million Venezuelans residing abroad, the protests aimed to "mobilize ... supporters worldwide" and gain recognition of the election in other countries in support of González and against Maduro. Demonstrators in countries outside of Venezuela sought also to support Venezuelans within the country who feared "speaking against Maduro and his allies during a brutal repression campaign", according to the Associated Press.

The largest of the European protests was in Spain, with attendance estimated at 15,000. From the demonstration in Portugal, Caracas native Franco De Vita published a video proclaiming, "The truth cannot be hidden; this is what the people have said and this is what the people want". In Miami, police estimated 8,000 attended the rally at Bayfront Park organized by the local Venezuelan and Cuban communities with performances planned by Willy Chirino, Arturo Sandoval, Amaury Gutiérrez and Danny Ocean.

Countries with cities where protests by Venezuelans abroad took place after the 2024 presidential elections

Machado announced that more than 300 locations worldwide had planned demonstrations. Protests were held in countries including:

- Americas and the Caribbean – Argentina, Brazil, Chile, Colombia, Costa Rica, Dominican Republic, Ecuador, Mexico, Panama, Paraguay, Peru, Puerto Rico, the United States, Uruguay
- Asia – India, Japan, Malaysia, South Korea, Taiwan
- Africa – Egypt, Madagascar
- Europe – Belgium, Denmark, France, Germany, Great Britain, Italy, Latvia, Netherlands, Portugal, Scotland, Spain, Switzerland
- Oceania – New Zealand, Australia

==== 17 August: Great National March for Peace ====
The Agence France-Presse (AFP) reported that "the ruling 'Chavista' movement ... also called demonstrations ... 'in support of the victory' of the president".

According to the United Socialist Party of Venezuela (PSUV—of which Maduro serves as president), "the Venezuelan people overflowed with love and joy in all states of the country" in the Great National March for Peace and in support of President Nicolás Maduro (Gran Marcha Nacional por la Paz y en apoyo al President Nicolás Maduro).

Globovisión (sanctioned by the US) wrote that the large movement to support Maduro's victory began early before ending at Miraflores Palace (the presidential palace) as a celebration "in rejection of far-right fascism". Globovision says that the celebrations occurred in 100 Venezuelan cities and comprised 10,000 motorizados (motorcycles in Venezuelan Spanish). Eduardo Piñate led the celebrations in San Fernando de Apure; Globovisión states that he "highlighted that all of Venezuela repudiates fascism and the psychological operations of imperialism and the extreme right that has sold out to foreign interests". Aragua state governor, Karina Carpio, "called on the people not to retreat and maintain the legacy of Bolívar and Chávez to a free, independent and sovereign homeland".

Infobae wrote that Maduro railed against González for not being present at the opposition rally, asking "Where is he hidden?" Speaking in front of Miraflores, Maduro mocked González as hiding in a cave and plotting to flee to Miami. With respect to Machado, he stated that "she deflated, she failed, they don't even want her in the opposition".

==== 28 August: One-month election anniversary ====
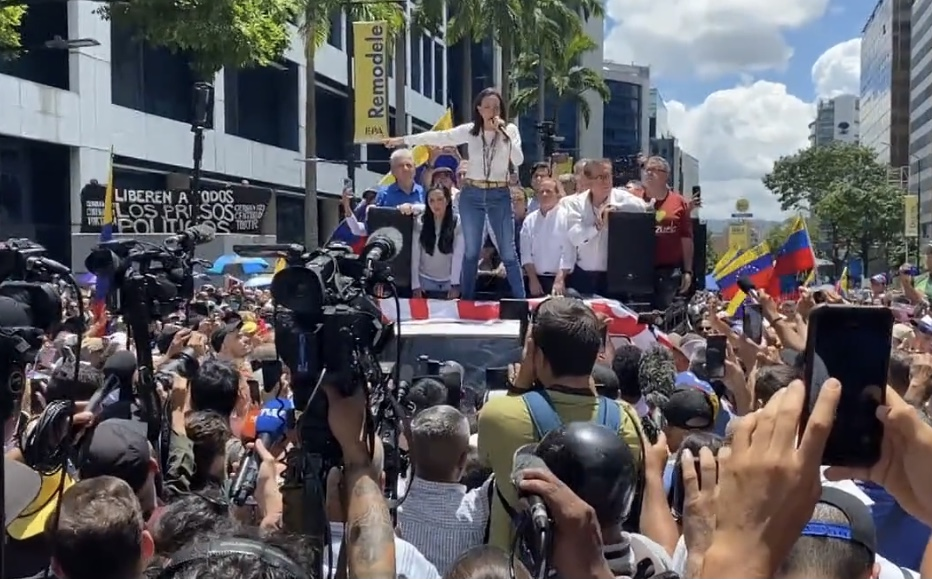
Machado addressing 28 August demonstration in Caracas

Machado called for a return to the street on 28 August with a rally centered at Avenida Francisco de Miranda in Caracas to reject the TSJ validation of Maduro as victor in the election, with a rally slogan of A la calle el 28 (to the street on the 28th) and the hashtag, #ActaMataSentencia ('a record kills a sentence', referring to the vote actas being stronger than a TSJ sentence).

Machado came out of hiding for this fourth organized rally and stated during her speech to the crowd in Caracas that no democratic countries recognize Maduro's victory and asked the Armed Forces to defend the constitution, speaking to a smaller group than at earlier protests.

Maduro backers also held a rally the same day. Smaller protests against Maduro convened in San Cristobal, Barquisimeto, Valencia and Puerto Ordaz; protests characterized by the Associated Press as "tiny" were held in other countries of Latin America.

After the mobilization in Caracas, Juan Pablo Guanipa and Biagio Pilieri were chased by armed men attempting to apprehend them in La Castellana, Caracas. Guanipa successfully escaped the attempt but Pilieri and his son, Jesús were captured.

==== 8–10 September: González seeks asylum ====
On 8 September, González left Venezuela to seek asylum in Spain. Upon his arrival in Madrid, he told the media that his exile was surrounded by pressure, coercion and threats and stated he would continue to fight from exile. After his departure, Machado stated the fight for freedom wouldn't end with González's departure and assured she would stay in Venezuela to fight with the people.

Machado called for the Venezuelan diaspora in Spain to mobilize on 10 September in front of Palacio de las Cortes, Madrid to demand recognition of González as President-elect of Venezuela, coordinated with the expected debate by the Spanish Congress of Deputies about recognizing González's election victory. Antonio Ledezma and Leopoldo Lopez were among the hundreds who attended the rally in Madrid, where Carolina González Urrutia read a letter from her father in which he called on the international community to continue its efforts in Venezuela and vowed that he would not let Venezuelans down. The Spanish Congress—without the support of Pedro Sanchez—voted the next day to recognize González as the legitimate President-elect of Venezuela.

==== 11 September: Rally for political prisoners ====
PROVEA, a Venezuelan human rights NGO, called for a rally on 11 September beginning at Plaza Bolívar in Chacao, Miranda and ending at the Brazilian embassy in La Castellana to demand an end to repression, and pressure the Brazilian government to intercede with the release of 2,500 political prisoners.

==== 28 September: Two-months election anniversary ====
Another mobilization has been called on 28 September in the wake of two-months anniversary of the election. in Carabobo, several banners were installed in place that were once a voting station for the 28 July election. Unlike the previous protest, Machado instructed the protesters to swarm in a smaller groups to read the election results of each voting stations, and upload their gatherings to social media.

Protests were also held by diaspora community abroad. The protest are notably held in cities like Miami, Madrid, and Buenos Aires. During the Madrid mobilisation, president-elect Edmundo González joined the rally for the first time since 3 August.

==== 3 October: Protest of families of detainees ====
On 3 October, families and parents of detained teenagers gathered in front of Supreme Tribunal of Justice building in Caracas to demand the safety of teenagers who are detained by the regime. Notable condemnation of persecution against teenagers were voiced by the Unitary Platform and Networks Party.

=== 2025 ===
==== 9 January: Eve of inauguration and resumption of mass mobilisation ====
After few months of swarm mobilisation, the Unitary Platform has again called for mass mobilisation in every states in the eve of presidential inauguration before Edmundo González planned return from Dominican Republic to Venezuela. While the movement was responded with repression, protesters managed to repel the National Guards which are reported in some cities such as San Cristóbal, Táchira and Valencia, Carabobo Clashes between protesters and National Guards was also reported in Maracaibo.

The protest also marked the return of the Unitary Platform leaders, María Corina Machado and Juan Pablo Guanipa, after months of hiding. Machado was detained following the protest; she was later released and announced on X that she was okay and in a safe place.

==== 10 January: Inauguration day ====
After Maduro was sworn in behind closed doors, there were some protests reported in the country. Cacerolazos were reportedly heard in Petare and Catia neighbourhood of Caracas. In Bejuma, Carabobo, local residents started to block the national highway.

As a reaction to the swearing in, Unitary Platform leader María Corina Machado explained what happened to her during the day before while accusing Maduro of having orchestrated an illegitimate coup and assured that de jure President Edmundo González will return to Venezuela as soon as the condition is safe. In a separate statement, Edmundo González addressed the nation saying that he will return to Venezuela no matter what and asked the military to prepare a secure condition for transition. The Communist Party of Venezuela also condemned the inauguration and call it "conspiracy of power against popular sovereignty".

== Crackdown ==
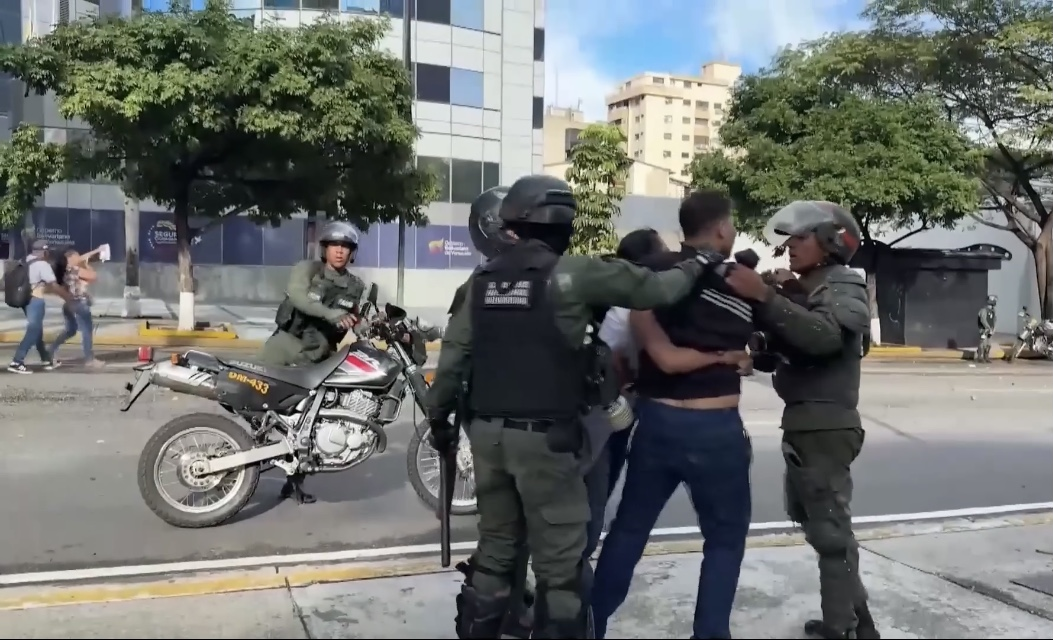
Protesters being apprehended on 3 August

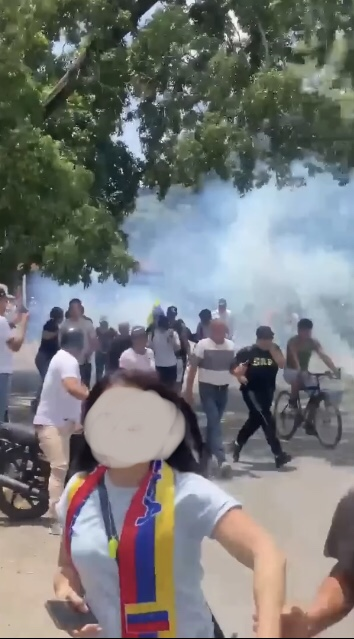
Protesters escaping tear gas

Maduro accused the opposition of promoting a coup. At least 2,000 people had been arrested as of 7 August; Clara del Campo of Amnesty International said that number included over 100 teens. Prior to the 17 August Great World Protest for the Truth, France 24 reported that Maduro called for the "state to use an 'iron fist' [and] urged 'severe justice' for violence he blames on the opposition".

=== Operation Tun Tun ===
In a crackdown by Maduro security forces following the elections, Operation Tun Tun (Operation Knock Knock) is the strategy Maduro mentioned; BBC News stated that "rights groups say it consists of the authorities going door-to-door to detain those with links to the protests or the opposition". Venezuela's counterintelligence agency, DGCIM used its social media accounts to warn that Operation Tun-Tun was just beginning, and set up a telephone line to gather reports about protesters, who Maduro officials refer to as traitors.

A campaign worker for the opposition told The Washington Post that "security forces and the Maduro-supporting bikers known as colectivos appear to be targeting low-income areas that have previously been strongholds of government support". Human rights groups and relatives of the detained said that they are typically charged with terrorism, are not allowed a private defense, and the whereabouts of many are unknown. Police from the government Brigade Against Terrorism and Subversion search houses for protestors.

Maduro ordered two of Venezuela's worst prisons to be rehabilitated to contain the detained, who have been held without legal defense for weeks after the protests began.

=== Cuban participation ===
According to the Miami Herald, "activists have denounced that a number of the agents taking part in repressing opposition figures and protesters have Cuban accents", as "at least four passenger flights" have arrived from Cuba, according to local media.

=== Online tracking ===
Maduro personally encouraged individuals to report those protesting the CNE election result through an internet application, VenApp. According to The Washington Post, "human rights advocates warned that [the app] could be repurposed" when it was created to report medical emergencies. Maduro stated: "We're opening a new page in the app for all the Venezuelan population, so they can confidentially give me all the information about the delinquents who have threatened the people—attacked the people—so we can go after them and bring them to prompt justice." Following a flood of complaints, the app was no longer found on Google and Apple stores because of the harassment potential. A web page created by the government allows users to post images or videos of protesters, to enable identification of the protesters by online readers of the web page. As of 1 August 2024, another 1,000 individuals were being sought for arrest.

Drones were used by the government over Caracas, which has discouraged some protestors.

== Siege against diplomatic mission ==
On 1 August, during the political crisis, the Maduro administration ordered the Argentine diplomatic mission to abandon the country within 72 hours, leaving six asylum seekers who were part of the opposition campaign in the embassy. Patrols from Bolivarian National Intelligence Service (SEBIN) and the Bolivarian National Police were deployed in front of the embassy and the embassy's electricity was cut. Brazil agreed to take custody of the Argentinian embassy.

Later on 6 September, the security forces again surrounded the embassy, shutting down road access to the embassy and cutting electric power; the move was widely condemned by the international community as a violation of the Vienna Convention on Diplomatic Relations. On the same day, the Venezuelan government unilaterally revoked Brazil's custody of the Argentinian embassy. The Brazilian foreign ministry rejected the unilateral revocation of custody and stated that Brazil would remain in custody of the embassy until another nation was willing to assume custody of the embassy.

== Reactions ==
=== Domestic ===
Through her X (formerly Twitter) account, María Corina Machado expressed that "after the overwhelming and unappealable electoral victory that we Venezuelans achieved on 28 July, the regime's response is murder, kidnapping and persecution. I alert the world about the cruel and repressive escalation of the regime, which to date has more than 177 arbitrary arrests, 11 forced disappearances and at least 16 murders in the last 48 hours. These crimes will not go unpunished." "I have told you that we are going all the way and we are going all the way! Now we have a new reason: the sacrifice that you make and have made."

Maduro blamed González and Machado for the violence. Maduro also blamed the United States government, businessman Elon Musk and the UN commissioner for human rights, Volker Türk, for wanting to "destabilize the country and take over Venezuela." Maduro and the government descroned the Venezuelan opposition, represented by María Corina Machado, of being "fascist and criminal" and stated on 31 July that the opposition would "never, ever" take power.

=== International ===
The UN International Mission expressed "its deep concern about the violence and allegations of human rights violations reported in the country following Sunday's presidential election." The repression has been condemned by Human Rights Watch.

According to Infobae a "forceful statement following the electoral fraud in Venezuela and the criminalization of protests" was published on 1 August by Amnesty International (AI) together with eleven human rights organizations that "condemned the repressive actions of the Nicolás Maduro regime in Venezuela and demanded that it guarantee the right to protest and full respect for the rights to life, personal integrity and freedom". In addition to AI, the signers of the statement were CIVICUS, Freedom House, International Commission of Jurists, Robert F. Kennedy Human Rights, Washington Office on Latin America, World Organization Against Torture and others. The joint statement mentioned a "disproportionate use of force by Venezuelan security forces" and "call[ed] on [Venezuelan] authorities to refrain from criminalizing protest" and "avoid the use of speeches that encourage and incite violence" against protesters. It highlighted "the use of lethal weapons", along with "politically motivated detentions, potentially unlawful killings", restrictions on freedom of the press, and internet shutdowns". The signatories reminded that Article 68 of the Venezuelan Constitution requires the right of demonstrators to be protected, and encouraged the international community to document crimes committed in the post-electoral process to the United Nations and the ICC.

Brian A. Nichols, of the US Department of State, condemned the ongoing repression and violence.

In an emergency session of Organization of American States, the secretary general Luis Almagro said he would file a report against Maduro to the International Criminal Court (ICC), which is investigating Venezuela for crimes against humanity, and ask the ICC to issue an arrest warrant against Maduro for the repression that is being committed after the election. On 12 August, Karim Ahmad Khan, who is Prosecutor of the International Criminal Court, stated that he had received reports regarding the repression and violence that has been committed by the Maduro regime and stated that the ICC is actively monitoring the situation. Amnesty International penned an open letter requesting urgent action from the ICC on the basis of the ongoing ICC investigation of Venezuela under Maduro's regime. On 18 August, a group of international jurists filed a complaint to the ICC to demand an arrest warrant be issued against Maduro. Individually, seven nations in the region (Argentina, Canada, Colombia, Chile, Paraguay, Peru, and Uruguay) have denounced Maduro in 2018 to the ICC.

The Permanent Council of the OAS met on 16 August and approved a resolution that called for the vote tallies to be protected and published, respect for the sovereignty of the election results, and emphasized the rights to basic freedoms without reprisals and arbitrary arrests. The resolution urged the Venezuelan election authorities to end state violence.

== See also ==
- Non-cooperation movement (2024)
- 2024 New Caledonia unrest
- 2021 Myanmar coup d'etat and protests (ongoing)
- 2020 Kyrgyz Revolution
- 2019 Bolivian political crisis
- 2010–2011 Ivorian crisis
- Orange Revolution (Ukraine, 2004–2005)
- Four Quarters March (Peru, 2000)
- Bulldozer Revolution (Yugoslavia, 2000)
- Fall of Suharto (Indonesia 1998)
