= Consejo de Expertos Electorales de Latinoamérica =

Latin American election monitoring group

- Established: 2004 (22 years ago)
- Types: organization
- Aim: election monitoring
- Directors: Nicanor Moscoso

The Consejo de Expertos Electorales de Latinoamérica (English: Council of Latin-American Electoral Experts) or CEELA (also Ceela), is an election monitoring group of Latin-American lawyers created in 2004. CEELA's president from 2008 to 2024 or later, Nicanor Moscoso, was one its founders.

== Creation and aims ==
CEELA was created based on a meeting in 2004 in Venezuela, as an electoral observation group of Latin-American former judges with electoral experience from countries tending to have left-wing governments. It aims to be a left-wing equivalent of electoral observation organisations supported by the Organization of American States. At its creation, its immediate aim was to provide legitimacy to the 2004 Venezuelan recall referendum.

According to Acceso a la Justicia, CEELA was created with Venezuelan government funding.

== Leadership and structure ==
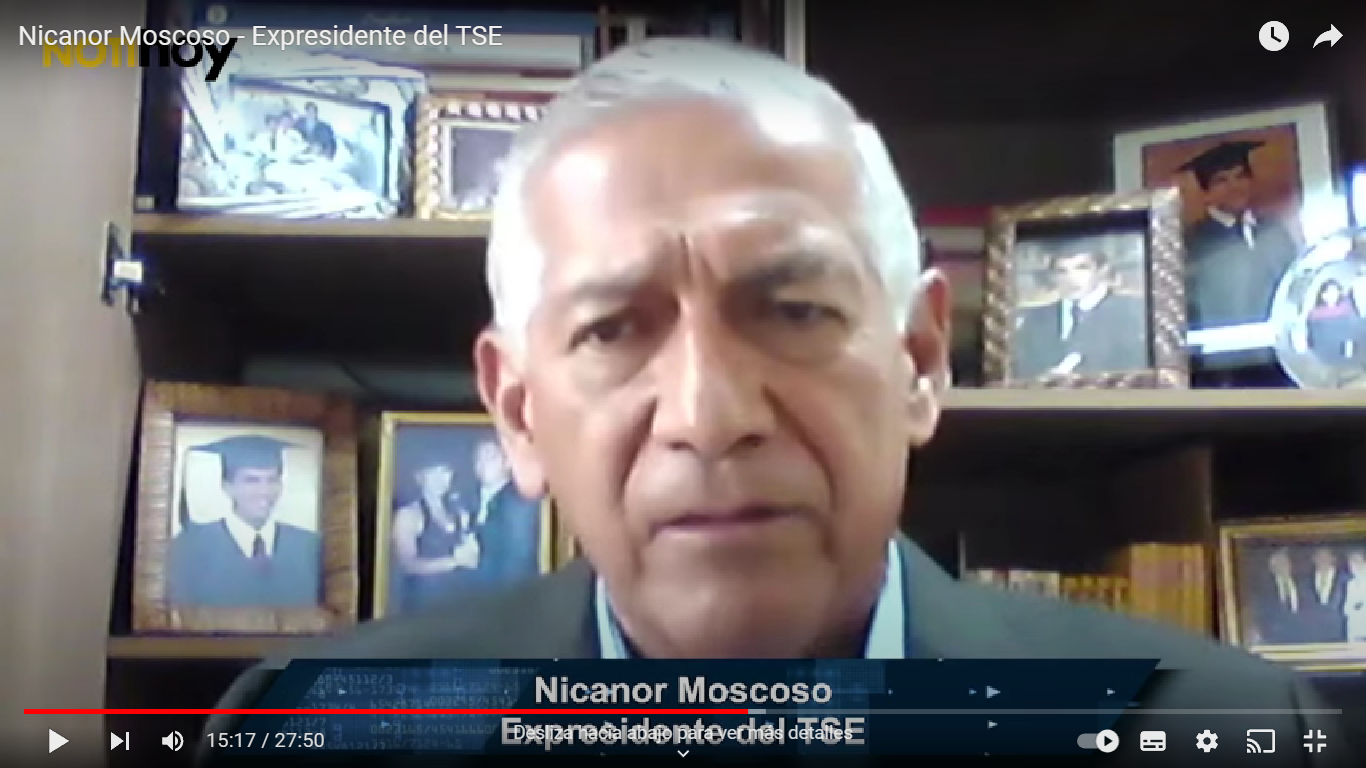
President of CEELA, Nicanor Moscoso

Nicanor Moscoso has been president of CEELA from 2008 to 2024 or later and was one of its founders.

Guillermo Reyes González, former head of the Colombian National Electoral Council, was a member of CEELA from its creation to 2017 or later. Other founding members of CEELA include Wilfredo Penco, who was a vice-president of the Electoral Court of Uruguay in 2016; Bolivian lawyer Oscar Hassenteufel; Víctor Gastón Soto, a Peruvian lawyer; Salvador Ramos and Ramón Antonio Hernández, Dominican lawyers; and Eugenio Chicas Martínez and Walter René Araujo Morales, Salvadoran lawyers.

As of 2016, other members of CEELA included Colombians Alexander Vega, Bernardo Franco Ramírez and Héctor Elí Rojas Jiménez.

== Actions ==
In 2010, CEELA and the OAS signed a cooperation agreement in relation to election monitoring, exchange of information and the organisations of conferences and meetings.

CEELA, along with other electoral observers in a "Mission of International Electoral Experts", observed the processes of the 2016 Nicaraguan general election from May to November 2016. The Mission's report listed twelve specific elements of the process that it saw as positive and made five recommendations for improvements.

In 2017, CEELA described the 2017 election for a Venezuelan constituent assembly as having complied with international standard and national legislation. Smartmatic, responsible for the computerized voting system, stated that it continued to consider all the results of Venezuelan elections from 2004 to 2015 to be valid based on the system's safeguards and audits, and that it was certain that the 2017 constituent assembly election results had been manipulated. It estimated "the difference between the actual participation and the one announced by authorities [to be] at least one million votes". Acceso a la Justicia described CEELA's report on the 2017 election as evidence of CEELA bias.

In April 2018, Acceso a la Justicia described CEELA's role in Venezuela as having been weakened by changes in electoral regulations as established by the Venezuelan National Electoral Council (CNE), stating that the task of "observation" was weakened to "accompaniment". Acceso a la Justicia pointed to Article 484, paragraph 1 and Article 485, paragraph 5, of the Basic Law of Electoral Processes (Spanish: Ley Orgánica de Procesos Electorales, LOPE) as preventing international observers from making public statements during the electoral process or publishing their final reports. Accesso a la Justicia also criticised Article 487, which allows the CNE to revoke the credentials of visiting observers without going through any administrative procedures.

Given CEELA's view of the 2017 constituent assembly election and the changes in the rules for election observing bodies, Acceso a la Justicia viewed CEELA's role in the 2018 Venezuelan presidential election of the following month as satisfying neither national nor international roles of independent election monitoring.

CEELA observed the 2024 Russian presidential election. Nicanor Moscoso, head of CEELA, stated that in the election, CEELA was able to "establish all the virtues of the Russian democratic system" (Spanish: establecer todas las virtudes que tiene el sistema democrático ruso). According to the Cuban state news agency Prensa Latina, Moscoso described the elections as "open", with "three voting systems" that were "very effective and secure". Meduza described the election as "the most fraudulent electio[n] in modern Russian history" based on its statistical analysis. Associated Press described the election as having been conducted with electoral irregularities including ballot stuffing and coercion.
