= Vicente José Gregorio Díaz Silva =

Venezuelan political rector

Vicente Díaz is a Venezuelan who was a rector appointed by the National Assembly of the Bolivarian Republic of Venezuela to the National Electoral Council on 27 April 2006.

== Education ==
Díaz graduated magna cum laude with a degree in Sociology from the Central University of Venezuela and pursued graduate studies at the University of Zulia's Institute of Advanced Management Studies and Metropolitan University.

== Manager and author ==
He held management positions in national and multinational companies in corporate divisions of Marketing, Human Resources and Total Quality. Vicente Díaz has served as vice president of the Cultural Association Maraven, Director of the Foundation for a miracle to Venezuela, and President of the National Tribute Foundation. Díaz has acted as a contributing writer for Venezuelan newspapers El Nacional, Notitarde and Quinto Día.

== National Electoral Council ==
Díaz became one of the five rectors of the National Electoral Council on 27 April 2006, continuing in the role through to 2010 or later. Díaz was seen as the only rector who was politically independent from the ruling political party. He was chair of the CNE's Committee on Political Participation and Financing.
