= Nogal (surname) =

Nogal is a surname of various origins. Notable people with the surname include:

- Aime Nogal (born 1979), Venezuelan lawyer
- Artur Nogal (born 1990), Polish speed skater
- Kaja Ziomek-Nogal (born 1997), Polish speed skater
- Mickaël Nogal (born 1990), French politician
