= Operation Tun Tun =

Term for raids by security forces in Venezuela

Operation Tun Tun (Spanish: Operación Tun Tun), also known as Operation Knock Knock, is the name coined by pro-government deputy Diosdado Cabello during the 2017 Venezuelan protests that describes a crackdown on dissent from the Venezuelan opposition using state security forces.

After the 2024 Venezuelan presidential election, Operation Tun Tun was activated to arrest large numbers of protesters and people opposed to the government of Nicolás Maduro and, according to human rights activists, to instill fear in opponents of the government and quell the 2024 Venezuelan protests.

== Term ==
In the second hearing of the Organization of American States to analyze possible crimes against humanity in Venezuela, Major General Hebert García Plaza described Operation Tun Tun as an operation normally carried out at night, where a Bolivarian Intelligence Service commission visits the person and takes them away, possibly without an arrest warrant or issued by a Public Ministry prosecutor.

When asked by the Argentine jurist Luis Moreno Ocampo about the origin of the name, García Plaza answered that although he did not know its origin and that "one would have to ask Diosdado Cabello", he supposed that it came from the sound emitted by the door when it is knocked by the security forces.

== Application ==
=== 2017: Venezuelan protests ===
On 17 May 2017, Diosdado Cabello assured during his television program Con el mazo dando that he would activate an operation called "Tun Tun" that night for people who imported implements for "terrorists", noting that the opposition "is going to get harder than a cat burglar" and describing Voluntad Popular deputy Freddy Guevara as a "drug addict". On 24 June, during a ceremony commemorating the Battle of Carabobo and Army Day, President Nicolás Maduro declared that all those detained in Operation Tun Tun were under military justice.

Cabello also threatened the shipping companies in the country, stating that "they contribute with the transfer of supplies that are used by members of these violent groups to generate acts of vandalism and terrorism in Venezuela" and declaring that the situation "will be taken to the competent authorities to investigate these actions", saying that shipping companies DHL, Liberty Express, Aduanera Las Dos L, Aduana Isacar and Economía Aduanera 2000 could be charged under the Anti-Terrorism Law.

A report by Human Rights Watch and Foro Penal documented at least six instances in which Venezuelan security forces raided residential areas and apartments in Caracas and in four different states. In some of the raids, which tended to occur near barricades built by protesters, security forces entered homes without search warrants, stealing personal belongings and food, and beating and arresting residents. The deputy of the Legislative Council of the Bolívar state, Cesar Ramírez, witnessed the raid in the urbanizations of Villa Latina, Los Olivos and Los Mangos in Puerto Ordaz, where officers of the National Guard, military counter-intelligence and the Bolivarian Intelligence Service were present with sledgehammers, demolition equipment, and firearms, breaking glass and main access doors and raiding residences. Ramirez described the actions of the officers as "very far from what is a police operation" stating that "it looked like a criminal operation with people in National Guard uniforms, hooded and with firearms causing destruction and running over a civilian population inside their homes, violating human rights". Ramírez requested the Attorney General's Office order a criminal investigation against governor Francisco Rangel Gómez, officials of the General Directorate of Military Counterintelligence and the Bolivarian National Guard for causing destruction to private property, raid of apartments without a court order and detaining a minor without an arrest warrant.

=== 2017–2018: Supreme Court in exile ===
On 24 June 2017, Diosdado Cabello threatened, again in his program Con el mazo dando, the candidates to be appointed by the National Assembly as judges of the Supreme Tribunal of Justice of Venezuela in exile, after the judges appointed in 2015 with vices and irregularities by the outgoing ruling party majority of the National Assembly, saying: "Let's see who will appoint you, who will defend you, to see if Julio Borges will defend you when the operation tuntun comes for you, let's see if they will defend you."

On the morning of 30 April 2018, officers of the Bolivarian National Intelligence Service (SEBIN) raided the Maturín house of relatives of the Supreme Court magistrate in exile, Elenis Rodríguez, where her mother, who had Alzheimer's disease, and a sister of the justice live, who was taken as a witness to testify but was released after several hours. SEBIN personnel took computer equipment from the home.

In the rest of the country, similar procedures were carried out against properties of at least four other magistrates, including Miguel Ángel Martín, who served as president of the Supreme Tribunal, and magistrates Cioly Zambrano, Tony Marval, and Pedro Troconis.

=== 2019: Present Future youth leadership program ===
On July 11, 2019, Diosdado threatened to apply Operation Tun Tun against Reinaldo Diaz Ohep and others who supported Present Future, a program promoting development of youth leaders.

=== 2020: COVID-19 pandemic ===
In 2020, the Academy of Physical, Mathematical and Natural Sciences of Venezuela published a report on the COVID-19 pandemic where it warned that the peak of the outbreak in the country could reach 4,000 cases per day in June. Cabello responded to the report by threatening the academy, saying "This is an invitation for security agencies to visit these people. It is an invitation to a tun tun". The academy rejected the threats.

=== 2024: Venezuelan presidential election ===
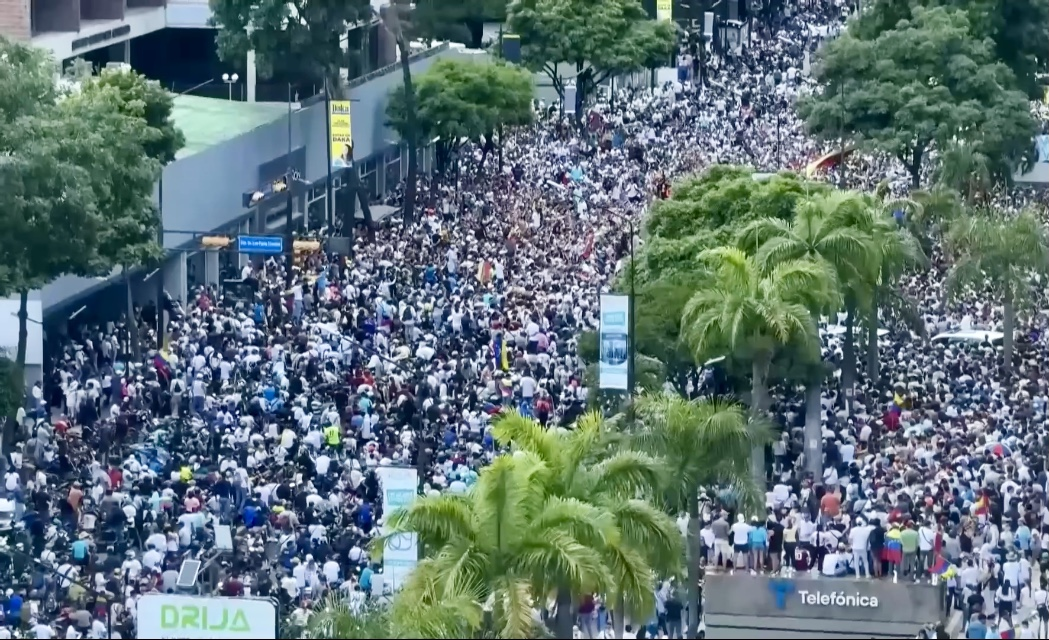
Demonstration in Caracas, August 2024

Following the 2024 Venezuelan presidential election and protests, Maduro accused the opposition of promoting a coup.

==== Crackdown on protesters ====
In a crackdown by Maduro security forces following the elections, Operation Tun Tun (Operation Knock Knock) is the strategy Maduro mentioned; BBC News stated that "rights groups say it consists of the authorities going door-to-door to detain those with links to the protests or the opposition". Rafael Uzcategui of Laboratorio de Paz "suggested the operation was intended to terrify Venezuelans into submission", adding that "what we are seeing is simply an effort to sew [sic] a climate of terror", according to The Guardian.

Venezuela's counterintelligence agency, DGCIM used its social media accounts to warn that Operation Tun-Tun was just beginning, and that it was "sin lloradera" (no weeping), implying that no amount of resistance would make a difference, and set up a telephone line to gather reports about protesters, who Maduro's officials refer to as guarimberos, coup plotters, terrorists or traitors.

The Maduro administration reported at least 2,000 people had been arrested as of 7 August; Clara del Campo of Amnesty International said that number included over 100 teens. Human rights groups and relatives of the detained said that they are typically charged with terrorism, are not allowed a private defense, and the whereabouts of many are unknown. Maduro ordered two prisons to be rehabilitated to contain the detained.

A campaign worker for the opposition told The Washington Post that "security forces and the Maduro-supporting bikers known as colectivos appear to be targeting low-income areas that have previously been strongholds of government support". According to the Miami Herald, a "retired Venezuelan Army major, who asked not to be named because he is being sought by the regime, said most of the violence seen in past days in Venezuela came from armed paramilitary groups that are being paid well to generate fear among their countrymen", adding that they are being offered US$1–2,000 to participate in the repression.

Maduro personally encouraged individuals to report those protesting the CNE election result through an internet application, VenApp, initially created to report problems oh the public services systems. According to The Washington Post, "human rights advocates warned that [the app] could be repurposed" when it was created to report medical emergencies. Maduro stated: "We're opening a new page in the app for all the Venezuelan population, so they can confidentially give me all the information about the delinquents who have threatened the people—attacked the people—so we can go after them and bring them to prompt justice." Following a flood of complaints, the app was removed and no longer found on Google and Apple stores because of the potential harassment. Another internet page created by the government allows users to post media of protesters where they can be identified by other users. As of 1 August, another 1,000 individuals were being sought for arrest.

A complaint from a neighbor may start the process, in which arrests are being conducted outside of the law.

Extortion from police and security forces, judges and prosecutors has been reported, with victims being asked to pay between US$500 and $15,000, depending on the charge, to be released.

==== Arrests of politicians and journalists ====
Freddy Superlano, a former candidate, was detained by masked men two days after the election. Shortly before, Cabello had announced that the arrest of ten opposition leaders was planned. Cabello confirmed Superlano's arrest 30 hours later but did not reveal his whereabouts. A week later, attorney Joel García confirmed that Superlano and journalist Roland Carreño (who also worked for the Popular Will party) were held in El Helicoide on unknown charges, calling their arrests "kidnapping with a judicial appearance". Representatives of Superlano's party said they were told by chavista informants that Superlano would be tortured to "make him confess to the false plan set up by regime spokesmen such as Tarek William Saab".

The same day that Superlano was detained, Ricardo Estévez, an advisor with Vente Venezuela for the González campaign, was taken from his residence by armed men from two unmarked cars, presumed to be from the Bolivarian Intelligence Service. Rafael Sivira, the youth coordinator for opposition party Radical Cause, and another unidentified person were also detained.

Vente Venezuela politician María Oropeza livestreamed as security forces broke into her residence without a search warrant and arrested her two hours after she described the ongoing detentions as a "witch hunt". According to Infobae, the DGCIM added music by Freddy Krueger (a character from A Nightmare on Elm Street) and published their edited version of the video. As of 9 August, her whereabouts were unknown.

BBC News says it has been told that journalists and activists have been targeted in Operation Tun-Tun. The Venezuelan SNTP (Syndicate of National Press Workers) denounced that reporter Yousner Alvarado and cameraman Paúl León were arrested shortly after the election, and photographer Deysi Penna was detained on 2 August. That same day, Chilean National Television said its journalist Iván Núñez and his cameraman José Luis Tapia were arrested; they were later released safely in Colombia.

==== Opposition targeted ====
Opposition leaders said that citizens who witnessed the vote tally sheets in the electoral process (poll watchers) were persecuted and detained. The CNE had their contact data; Maduro accused them of being guerillas, according to NTN 24. Many poll watchers "fled their homes in fear".

On 2 August, Vente Venezuela said its offices in Caracas were attacked by six armed individuals who ransacked the premises.

==== Cuban participation ====
According to the Miami Herald, "activists have denounced that a number of the agents taking part in repressing opposition figures and protesters have Cuban accents", as "at least four passenger flights" have arrived from Cuba, according to local media. José Colina, a former lieutenant in the Venezuelan National Guard, told the Miami Herald that his military sources still in Venezuela say that some of the Operation Tun Tun searches and arrests are conducted by Cubans.

== Reception ==
Nicmer Evans, Editor of Aporrea and political scientist, described the operation as "fascist". He recounted an incident in which a contingent of security agents from the Bolivarian National Intelligence Service (SEBIN) arrived at his home in Caracas to question him about the whereabouts of deputy Germán Ferrer – the husband of then-prosecutor Luisa Ortega Díaz.

In 2020, constitutionalist Joel Rodríguez Ramos declared that Operation Tun Tun "presaged barbarism".

Human rights organizations, investigative journalism outlets, and United Nations documentation described patterns of arbitrary detentions, forced entry into homes without judicial warrants, and use of vaguely defined charges such as “terrorism” and “instigation to hatred” to justify arrests of protesters and government critics.

== See also ==
- Great Purge in the Soviet Union
- Campaign to Suppress Counterrevolutionaries, Cultural Revolution and the Great Leap Forward in China
- Cambodian genocide
- Enforced disappearances in Venezuela
