= Aime Nogal =

Aimé Nogal

Principal Rector of the National Electoral Council
- Incumbent
- Assumed office 24 August 2023
- Appointed by: National Assembly

Personal details
- Born: Aimé Clarisa Nogal Méndez
- Occupation: Lawyer, politician

Aime Clarisa Nogal Méndez or Aime Nogal, officially Acme Clarisa Nogal Méndez, is a Venezuelan lawyer and politician who specialises in electoral processes. Nogal was a leader of Un Nuevo Tiempo. Nogal became one of the five rectors of the National Electoral Council (CNE) in August 2023. She was born in Caracas in 1978 or 1979 (age 46–47).

== Education and early career ==
Nogal graduated in law, specialising in civil law, and in digital marketing and in search engine optimization at the Central University of Venezuela.

Nogal became a leader of the Venezuelan political party Un Nuevo Tiempo.

Nogal provided training and advice to non-governmental organisations about electoral participation, negotiation and confidence-building.

== National Electoral Council ==
Nogal was an advisor to the National Electoral Council (CNE) from 2005 to 2012 or 2016.

In August 2023, she became one of the five CNE rectors. Nogal and Juan Carlos Delpino Boscán were two opposition representatives out of the five.

According to Armando.info, in August 2024, following the 28 July Venezuelan presidential election, Nogal stopped answering phone calls from leaders of the opposition. El Observador stated that an anonymous source described working meetings of the CNE as having given the impression of having a ratio of four-to-one pro-government-to-opposition members rather than three-to-two. When contacted by Armando.info, Nogal only accepted the publication of two sentences: "I have not abandoned the opposition" ("yo no he abandonado a la oposición") and "I take responsibility for this downpour and will never speak ill of the opposition" ("yo asumo este chaparrón y nunca hablaré mal de la oposición").
