= National Electoral Council (Venezuela) =

Electoral branch of the Venezuelan government

- Consejo Nacional Electoral; CNE
- Logo of CNE

Agency overview
- Formed: 1999
- Preceding agency: Supreme Electoral Council
- Jurisdiction: Government of Venezuela
- Headquarters: Plaza Caracas; Caracas, Venezuela
- Motto: Electoral Power (Poder Electoral)
- Agency executives: Elvis Amoroso (2024), President; Carlos Enrique Quintero Cuevas (2024), Vice President
- Key document: Article 296, Constitution of the Bolivarian Republic of Venezuela

The National Electoral Council (Spanish: Consejo Nacional Electoral, CNE) is the head of one of the five branches of government of Venezuela under its 1999 constitution. It is the institution that has the responsibility of overseeing and guaranteeing the transparency of all elections and referendums in Venezuela at the local, regional, and national levels. The creation of the CNE was ratified in Venezuela's 1999 constitutional referendum. Following the election of Nicolás Maduro into the presidency, the CNE has been described, by the president's opponents, as being pro-Maduro.

== History ==
The CNE was preceded by the Supreme Electoral Council (CSE), which was established under an electoral law on September 11, 1936. This entity was replaced by the CNE in 1997 with the passage of a new Organic Law of Suffrage and Participation.

== Structure ==
The National Electoral Council (CNE) is composed of five persons; three of them nominated by civil society, one by the faculties of law and political science at national universities, and one by the Citizen Power. The three members nominated by civil society shall have six alternates in ordinal sequence, and each appointed by the universities and the Citizen Power has two alternates, respectively. Members of the National Electoral Council last seven years in office and be elected separately: the three nominated by civil society at the beginning of each period of the National Assembly, and the other two in the middle of it. Members of the National Electoral Council shall be appointed by the National Assembly with the vote of two thirds of its members. Members of the National Electoral Council will designate from among its members its president, in accordance with the law. (Article 296, Constitution of the Bolivarian Republic of Venezuela).

== Leadership ==
In 2010, the five rectors of the CNE were Tibisay Lucena (CNE president); Sandra Oblitas Ruzza (CNE vice president; also President of the Civil and Electoral Registry Commission); Vicente José Gregorio Díaz Silva (President of the Political Participation and Finance Commission); Socorro Elizabeth Hernández de Hernández; and Tania D'Amelio Cardiet (member of the Civil and Electoral Registry Commission). Xavier Antonio Moreno Reyes was the CNE's general secretary. Roberto Ignacio Mirabal Acosta was a legal consultant.

As of March 2016, four of the CNE rectors were the same as those of 2010, except that Vicente Díaz had been replaced by Luis Emilio Rondón González.

In June 2020, Indira Alfonzo became president of the CNE. The other four rectors, as of July 2020, were Rafael Simón Jiménez Melean (CNE vice-president); Tania D'Amelio Cardiet; Gladys María Gutiérrez Alvarado; and José Luis Gutiérrez Parra.

As of October 2021, the five rectors of the CNE were Pedro Enrique Calzadilla Pérez (president); Enrique Octavio Márquez Pérez (vice-president); Tania D'Amelio Cardiet; Alexis José Corredor Pérez; and Roberto Antonio Picón Herrera.

Starting in August 2023, the five rectors of the CNE were Elvis Eduardo Hidrobo Amoroso (CNE president); Carlos Enrique Quintero Cuevas (CNE vice-president); Rosalba Gil Pacheco; Juan Carlos Delpino Boscán; and Aime Clarisa Nogal Méndez. At the time of their appointments, Amoroso, Quintero and Gil Pacecho were seen as representing the government, while Delpino and Nogal were seen as representing the opposition.

== Analysis ==
The electoral system of Venezuela, administered under the 1999 Constitution as one of the five branches of government, is controversial. The Supreme Tribunal of Justice, with the majority supporting Chávez, elected officials to the supposedly non-partisan National Electoral Council of Venezuela (CNE) despite the 1999 Constitution stating for the National Assembly of Venezuela to perform the task. That resulted with the CNE board having a majority consisting of Chavistas or those that supported Chávez. Since then, the Venezuelan government controlled by the PSUV ruling party manipulated elections, holding control of the CNE, the media and through government spending.

According to the United States Department of State, there is "widespread pre- and post-election fraud, including electoral irregularities, government interference, and manipulation of voters" and "opposition political parties [have] operated in a restrictive atmosphere characterized by intimidation, the threat of prosecution or administrative sanction on questionable charges, and restricted media access". International observers have had difficulties monitoring the elections, though the Bolivarian government accepts the praise of their elections from UNASUR allies.

Several different criticisms of the Venezuelan electoral system were made. In 2005, it was alleged that the Supreme Tribunal of Justice, with a pro-Chávez majority, appointed officials to the Venezuelan National Electoral Council despite the 1999 Constitution stipulating that this task was to be performed by the National Assembly. As a result, the CNE's board of directors was composed predominantly of individuals aligned with Chavismo. Since then, the Venezuelan government, controlled by the ruling PSUV, has manipulated elections by maintaining control over the CNE, utilizing media outlets, and leveraging government spending. According to the United States Department of State, there was "widespread pre- and post-election fraud, including electoral irregularities, government interference, and voter manipulation," and "opposition political parties operate in a restrictive atmosphere characterized by intimidation, threats of prosecution or administrative sanctions on questionable charges, and restricted media access." International observers had difficulties monitoring the elections.

On June 12, 2020, the Supreme Tribunal of Justice appointed CNE rectors after the controversial ruling of legislative omission by the opposition-majority Parliament, which, according to the Constitution of Venezuela, is responsible for selecting the electoral body directors. This was agreed upon between Nicolás Maduro's government and the interim government of Juan Guaidó. The TSJ's decision has been criticized by the opposition and international observers, as it violates the separation of powers and undermines democracy in the country. Additionally, it adds to a series of actions taken by Maduro's government seen as attempts to consolidate its control over the Venezuelan state apparatus and suppress the opposition.

While the Constitution of the Bolivarian Republic of Venezuela authorizes the Supreme Tribunal of Justice to appoint members of the Electoral Body when the National Assembly fails to reach a minimum percentage of deputies, beyond the composition of the electoral body, the organization of the electoral act and the formation of polling stations ensure the invulnerability of the vote as they are composed of randomly selected community members, witnesses, and political party representatives. The electoral act is entirely electronic, consisting of the following steps:

1. The voter enables the vote with their fingerprint, ensuring one voter, one vote.
2. The voter makes their selection on the machine's touchscreen.
3. The voting machine prints a receipt, which the voter verifies and deposits in the ballot box.
4. At the close of the electoral act, results are totaled, transmitted by each machine, and the corresponding minutes are printed.
5. 90% of the ballot boxes are audited in the presence of the community.
6. Copies of the minutes are given to the representatives of the political parties present, who transmit them to their own computing centers.

As observed, both voters and participating political organizations can verify the voter's intention multiple times during the electoral act, making the electoral results difficult to tamper with.

=== Supreme Tribunal of Justice Intervention in 2020 ===
On June 5, 2020, the Supreme Tribunal of Justice of Venezuela (TSJ) declared the constitutional omission of the National Assembly of Venezuela and empowered itself to appoint the rectors of the National Electoral Council. On June 11, 2020, the IV legislature of the National Assembly of Venezuela did not recognize the TSJ's decision and decided to continue the process of nominating candidates for CNE rectors, which was halted during the months of the coronavirus pandemic.

Despite the lack of precedent or legal basis in the Venezuelan Constitution for TSJ intervention, on June 13, 2020, it appointed the new electoral directors based on the ruling declaring the legislative omission.

=== Smartmatic and the Constituent Election ===
Smartmatic, the company responsible for providing the electronic voting system in Venezuela, publicly denounced "data manipulation" during the elections for the Constituent Assembly. This denunciation was made at a press conference in London by the company's CEO, Antonio Mugica, who pointed out a discrepancy of at least one million votes between the official figures and those recorded by their system in August 2017. The National Electoral Council (CNE) of Venezuela, in turn, rejected these accusations, defending the official participation figure of 41.53%, equivalent to 8 million voters. CNE President Tibisay Lucena described Mugica's statements as "irresponsible" and "baseless".

Smartmatic has been the provider of voting technology in Venezuela since 2004. Smartmatic stated that, unlike previous elections, in the 2017 election, there were no opposition auditors present, who are considered essential as process witnesses. The absence of these auditors was due to the opposition's decision not to participate in these elections. Given the situation, several countries announced that they would not recognize the election results. The Venezuelan opposition had previously estimated a participation rate of 12.4% of the electoral roll, translating to about 2.4 million voters.

After Smartmatic's denunciation, opposition leader Julio Borges stated that the company's declarations confirmed the opposition's previous allegations and described the situation as a "global earthquake." On the other hand, Antonio Mugica asserted that Smartmatic had irrefutable evidence of the manipulation of participation data. Despite Smartmatic's significant contributions to various elections in Venezuela and other countries, the company has not been free from controversy. In the past, it was accused of having ties with the late Venezuelan President Hugo Chávez. However, with its international growth, the firm appears to have prioritized its credibility and reputation over any previous relationship with the Venezuelan government.

=== ExClé C.A ===
The company ExClé C.A, a subsidiary of the Argentine company Ex-Clé S.A, was contracted after Smartmatic's withdrawal by Dr. Rafael Simón Jiménez, who was a CNE rector, to acquire voting machines in 2020. ExClé C.A was sanctioned by the Office of Foreign Assets Control (OFAC) of the U.S. Department of State on December 18, 2020, after the 2020 Venezuelan parliamentary election.

=== Parliamentary Elections in Venezuela ===
On Sunday, December 6, Venezuela held its parliamentary elections. These elections, called by the Nicolás Maduro government and widely boycotted by the opposition, raised concerns and controversy over their legitimacy. Maduro, who controls the country's judicial system and electoral bodies, is determined to reclaim the National Assembly in 2021. If successful, this would further consolidate his government's power and weaken the opposition, led by Juan Guaidó. Guaidó, recognized by many as Venezuela's interim president, would see his term as a deputy officially end on January 4, 2021.

Several events highlighted concerns about the 2024 parliamentary election's procedural legitimacy. A new National Electoral Council was elected without National Assembly approval. There were judicial interventions in political parties and an illegal increase in the number of parliamentarians. The outcome of these elections and how they are perceived internationally may have had significant implications for Venezuelan politics and international relations. Some countries, like Brazil and members of the Lima Group, stated that they would not recognize the results if deemed fraudulent. The position of Guaidó and his international recognition could also have been affected by the outcome and perception of these elections.

=== 2024 presidential elections ===
The body has been strongly criticized —both within Venezuela and internationally— for releasing only the overall election results without breaking down the vote by polling station and for its refusal to publish the official records, table by table. On July 29, 2024, the CNE reported that president Nicolás Maduro, candidate for re-election, would have obtained 5,150,092 votes, while 4,445,978 voters would have voted for opposition candidate Edmundo González Urrutia, and the rest of the candidates together would have received 462,704 votes. These voting figures (adjusted to 5 decimal places) yield percentages of exactly 51.20000%, 44.20000%, and 4.60000%, respectively, which is interpreted as an indication of fraud, since the probability of this coincidence of percentage figures with exactly four zeros is one in 100 million. Former mayor Juan Barreto Cipriani questioned the second bulletin issued on Friday, August 2 by the National Electoral Council, demanded the polling station records, and criticized the fact that it was a second bulletin without citizen auditing. On August 5, it was denounced that the CNE had been hiding the records for eight days, as Andrés Velásquez stated; Venezuela is plunged into a political crisis due to the "coup given to the results by Maduro and the anti-democratic military leadership".

== See also ==
- Venezuelan recall referendum of 2004
- 2005 Venezuelan parliamentary election
- 2006 Venezuelan presidential election
- 2007 Venezuelan constitutional referendum
