= Agreement for Change =

Agreement for Change Concertación por el Cambio
- General Secretary: Henri Falcón
- Founded: 21 June 2018; 8 years ago
- Dissolved: September 2020
- Split from: Democratic Unity Roundtable (MUD); United Socialist Party of Venezuela (PSUV); Fatherland for All (PPT)
- Merged into: Democratic Alliance
- Headquarters: Caracas
- Ideology: Anti-Chavismo; Christian democracy (Christian left); Social democracy Social liberalism Progressivism; Democratic socialism Reformism; Bolivarianism
- Political position: Centre-left
- Colors: Blue
- Seats in the National Assembly: 8 / 167
- Seats in the Latin American Parliament: 1 / 12
- Seats in the Mercosur Parliament: 1 / 23
- Governors: 0 / 23
- Mayor: 15 / 335

Agreement for Change (Spanish: Concertación por el Cambio) was a Venezuelan coalition created on June 21, 2018 by former 2018 presidential candidate and Chavismo defector Henri Falcón. The coalition initially integrated seven political parties opposed to the government of Nicolás Maduro. The alliance was committed to what they called the "democratic route" through mechanisms such as voting, dialogue, peaceful protests and the rejection of foreign intervention.

== History ==
=== Creation ===
On June 21, 2018, Progressive Advance leader and former 2018 presidential candidate Henri Falcon, announced the creation of the alliance, composed of the political parties and movements who supported his candidacy in the recent presidential elections of May 2018. Falcon said that there was separated from the Democratic Unity Roundtable - a coalition in which militated since 2010 - but it is "deviated from its path," claiming that his coalition will follow the electoral "route". He also said that his platform will present proposals to the country in the face of the current crisis it faces.

The alliance presented its economic proposals by integrating wage dollarization.

=== Analysis ===
Columnist Ascension Reyes from El Nacional said an internal crisis deepens in the Democratic Unity Roundtable coalition, and the creation of Concertación means another division.

== Parties and movements ==
Among the political parties and movements that made up this coalition are:

Party/movement	Ideology
Progressive Advance	Progressivism
Movement for Socialism	Democratic socialism
Let's Change Movement	Pluralism
Ecological Movement of Venezuela	Ecology
Solutions Movement	Social democracy
Together Movement	Democratic socialism
Independents for National Community	Bolivarianism
COPEI	Christian democracy
Front Movement with Venezuela	Pluralism

== Elections ==
=== Municipal ===
- 2018 Venezuelan municipal elections: 9 municipal officials (2.7%)

=== Municipal Councils ===
According to Efecto Cocuyo news portal, out of 80 municipals that had the opposition previously held now remains with 10 following the 9 December 2018 elections.

- El Hatillo Municipality
- Chacao Municipality
- Monte Carmelo (Trujillo) Municipality
- Maneiro Municipality
- Los Salias Municipality
- Diego Bautista Urbaneja Municipality
- Simón Rodríguez (Táchira) Municipality
- Seboruco Municipality
- Francisco de Miranda Municipality
- Antonio Pinto Salinas Municipality
- Guaraque Municipality
- Buchivacoa Municipality

== See also ==
- Democratic Unity Roundtable
