= List of governors of Nueva Esparta =

- State coat of arms

- Flag of the State
- Incumbent; Marisel Velásquez
- Style: Governor
- Status: Head of State
- Term length: Four years

This is a list of governors of the Venezuelan Nueva Esparta State:

Until 1989, they were appointed by the president of Venezuela. Starting from that year they are elected in universal, direct and secret elections.

== Elected governors ==
Took office	Left office	Governor	Vote
1989	1992	Morel Rodríguez Ávila, Democratic Action	49.02
1992	1994	Morel Rodríguez Ávila, Democratic Action	48.81
1994	1995	Morel Rodríguez Ávila, Democratic Action	50.43
1995	1998	Rafael Tovar, COPEI	48.25
1998	1999	Rafael Tovar†, COPEI	46.31
1999	2000	Irene Sáez Conde*, MVR, IRENE	70.29
2000	2004	Alexis Navarro Rojas, MVR	49.82
2004	2008	Morel Rodríguez Ávila, Democratic Action	51.33
2008	2012	Morel Rodríguez Ávila, Democratic Action	57,53
2012	2017	Carlos Mata Figueroa, PSUV	54,06
2017	2021	Alfredo Díaz, Democratic Action	51,81
2021	2025	Morel Rodríguez Ávila, Neighborhood Force	42,48
2025	2029	Marisel Velásquez, GPPSB	55,53

(†) = Died in office. (*) = Resigned office for health issues.

== See also ==
- List of Venezuela governors
- Politics of Venezuela
- History of Venezuela
