= Fabiola Zavarce =

Venezuelan activist (born 1971)

Fabiola Zabarce

Ambassador of Venezuela to Panama
- In office 29 January 2019 – 4 February 2021
- Appointed by: National Assembly of Venezuela
- President: Juan Guaidó

Personal details
- Born: 30 September 1971 (age 55) Barquisimeto, Lara state
- Education: Universidad Rafael Urdaneta
- Occupation: Activist

Fabiola Zavarce (born 30 September 1971) is a Venezuelan activist. In 2019 she was appointed by the National Assembly as the Venezuelan ambassador to Panama.

== Career ==
Zavarce is a civil engineer by profession graduated from the Rafael Urdaneta University in 1994, specialist in the design and construction of interiors, and since 2012 has a master's degree in business administration from the American InterContinental University in the United States. He has also studied for a diploma in management and public policy.

She is founder of the Justice First political party in the Zulia state, and from 2002 to 2010 she was a community leader in the family finance and justice program. Between 2010 and 2014 she participated in the Unity Committee for the organization of the Venezuelan presidential elections in Houston, and is founder of the non-governmental organization "Bienestar para crecer en Texas". She is also co-founder of the foundation "Activados Panama", created in 2018 to support the migration process of vulnerable Venezuelans migrants in Panama; by 2019 the foundation had helped more than 750 people.

During the Venezuelan presidential crisis, she was appointed by the National Assembly as Venezuela's ambassador to Panama on 29 January 2019. Among other efforts during his tenure, Zavarce has focused on the regularization process of Venezuelan migrants in Panama; a presidential decree has allowed the recognition of expired passports and the certification of licenses that by September 2019 had benefited more than 11,000 Venezuelans. After the election of President Laurentino Cortizo in the 2019 presidential elections, Panama withdrew Zavarce's diplomatic credentials on 4 February 2021.
