= Tomás Guanipa =

Venezuelan politician

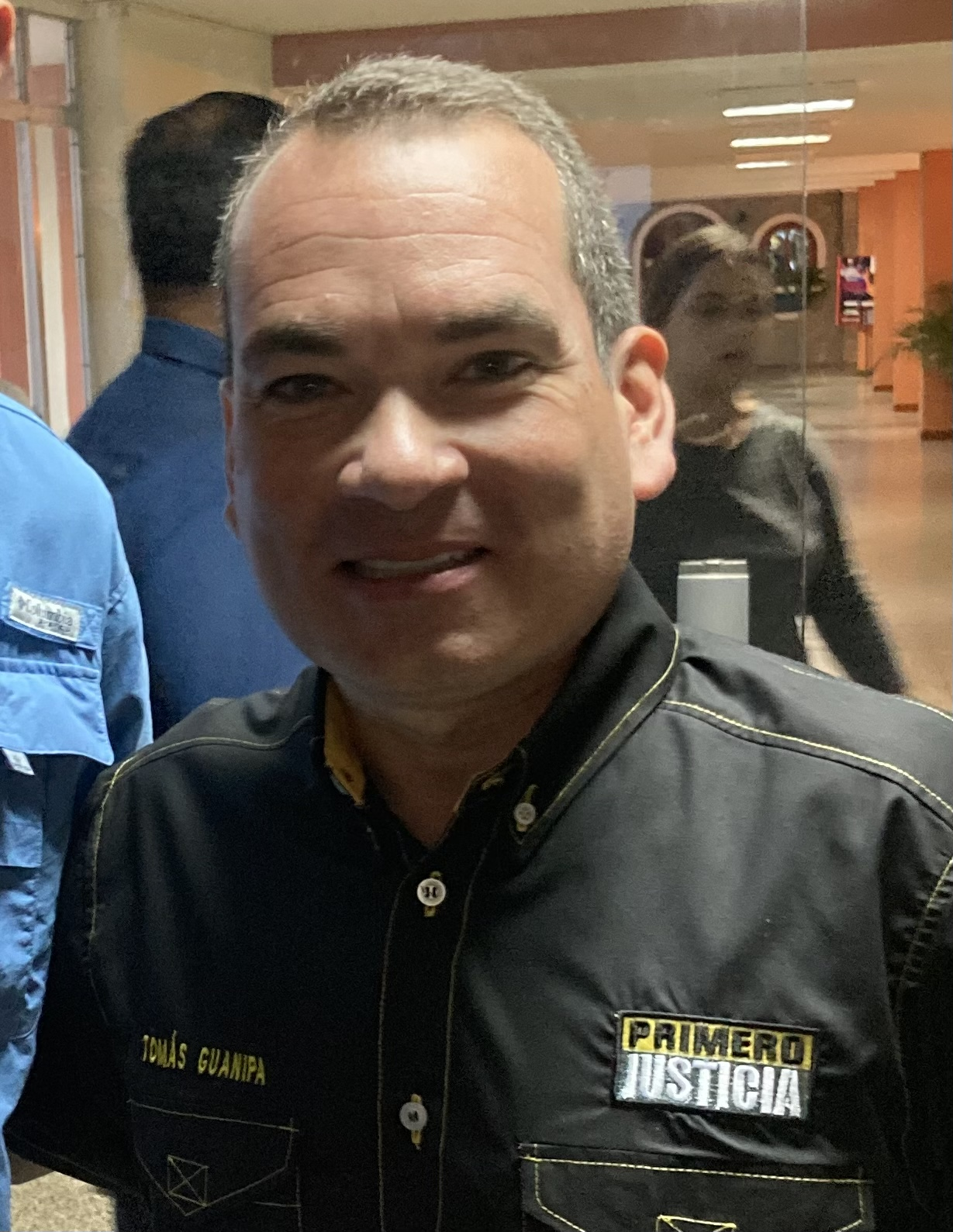
- Guanipa in 2022

Deputy of the National Assembly for Zulia State
- In office 5 January 2011 – 20 January 2020

Secretary-General of Justice First
- In office 2007 – 14 April 2025
- Preceded by: Carlos Ocariz
- Succeeded by: Juan Pablo Guanipa

Personal details
- Born: 31 December 1971 (age 54) Maracaibo, Venezuela
- Party: Justice First (2000–2025); Union and Change (2025–)
- Education: Rafael Urdaneta University

Tomás Ignacio Guanipa Villalobos (born 31 December 1971, Maracaibo) is a Venezuelan administrator and politician currently serving as a member of the National Assembly of Venezuela for Union and Change. He was previously leader of the Justice First party.

== Early life ==
Guanipa is the son of Manuel Guanipa Matos, a well-known politician in Zulia associated with the Copei party and Corina Villalobos. Tomás came from a Catholic family, well-represented in business, politics and law. He has six brothers; two lawyers, an educator and three businessmen. One of his brothers, Juan Pablo Guanipa, was a councilman in Maracaibo and coordinator of Justice First in Zulia.

Guanipa has a degree in administration from Rafael Urdaneta University with a specialty in business management.

== Political life ==
Guanipa started in political activity at a very young age like his father in the Copei party; However, together with a group of young people, they decided to leave the party and formed the Zulia 89 movement with the aim of supporting Oswaldo Álvarez Paz to the governorship of Zulia.

After working for the government managing state foundations, Guanipa decided to establish the centrist Primero Justicia in 2000, becoming its coordinator in Zulia from 2000 to 2007, and after 2004 became part of their national board. After Carlos Ocariz announced his candidacy for the seat in Sucre, Guanipa was named as the successor to Ocariz as general secretary of the party, which he has held since 2007.

In 2005, Guanipa announced his candidacy for a seat to the National Assembly, but the opposition political bloc decided not to attend the parliamentary elections of that year, after which he withdrew his candidacy.

After announcing the convocation of parliamentary elections in 2010, Guanipa is running as a candidate for Deputy for Circuit 7 of the State of Zulia, and after gaining the support of all the political factors of the entity, he became the candidate of the Democratic Unity Roundtable to the aforementioned regional constituency.

On 26 September 2010, Guanipa was declared the winner of the electoral contest of Circuit 7 formed by the parishes of Cacique Mara, Cecilio Acosta and Cristo de Aranza with 33,175 votes or 61.05% of the vote, with which he became a deputy to the National Assembly of Venezuela for Zulia.

On 14 April 2025, Guanipa was expelled from Justice First after he decided to participate in the 2025 parliamentary elections despite calls for a boycott.
