= Alexis Navarro =

Venezuelan politician, physician, and diplomat

Governor of Nueva Esparta
- In office June 8, 2000 – October 31, 2004
- Preceded by: Irene Sáez
- Succeeded by: Morel Rodríguez Ávila

Personal details
- Born: Alexis Rafael Navarro Rojas; October 2, 1946 Maneiro Municipality, Margarita Island, Venezuela
- Died: May 22, 2016 (aged 69) Caracas, Venezuela
- Party: Fifth Republic Movement (MVR)
- Spouse: Gabriela Montilla Ríos
- Education: University of Zaragoza; Central University of Venezuela; University of Salamanca

Alexis Rafael Navarro Rojas (October 2, 1946 – May 22, 2016) was a Venezuelan politician, physician, and diplomat. Navarro served as the governor of the Venezuelan state of Nueva Esparta from 2000 until 2004 as a member of the MVR political party. He also served as the Ambassador of Venezuela to the Russian Federation from 2005 until 2008 under Hugo Chávez.

== Career ==
Navarro was born on October 2, 1946, in El Pilar, a section of Maneiro Municipality on Margarita Island, Nueva Esparta.He married María del Carmen Cabezas, whom he had 3 children with. He later went on to marry Gabriella Montilla who bore his 4th child. In 1970, Navarro graduated from the University of Zaragoza in Spain with a bachelor of medicine.He then studied to become a surgeon, specializing in trauma, at the Central University of Venezuela.He also received a master's degree in psychiatry from the University of Salamanca in Spain. Navarro later chaired the School of Medicine at the Central University of Venezuela (UCV).

Navarro was a former member of the National Assembly, where he represented Nueva Esparta.A leftist politician and close ally of Hugo Chavez, Navarro was elected Governor of his home state of Nueva Esparta in 2000. Navarro, the candidate of Chavez's Fifth Republic Movement (MVR), narrowly won the state gubernatorial election by garnering 60,928 votes, or 49.82%, defeating his opponent, Morel Rodríguez Ávila of the Democratic Action (AD). He held the position of Governor of Nueva Esparta from 2000 until 2004.

The Chavez government later appointed Navarro as Ambassador to Russia from 2005 until 2008.

Navarro died of a heart attack in Caracas, Venezuela, on May 22, 2016, at the age of 69. He was buried in the cementerio de Los Robles on Margarita Island on May 24, 2016.
