= Guanipa =

Guanipa is a surname. Notable people with the surname include:

- Juan Pablo Guanipa (born 1964), Venezuelan lawyer and politician
- Tomás Guanipa (born 1971), Venezuelan administrator and politician
