= San Simon =

San Simon or San Simón may refer to:

== Places ==
- San Simon, Arizona, an unincorporated community
- San Simón, El Salvador, a municipality
- San Simon, Pampanga, a municipality in the Philippines
- San Simón, Táchira, a town in Táchira, Venezuela
- San Simón Almolongas, a town and municipality in Oaxaca, Mexico
- San Simón Zahuatlán, a town and municipality in Oaxaca, Mexico
- Island of San Simón, Galicia, Spain
- San Simon Valley, near the Dos Cabezas Mountains, U.S.A.
- Mexico City Metrobús Line 1#San Simón

== Other uses ==
- Club Social Deportivo San Simón, a football club from Lima, Peru
- San Simón AKA Maximón, an object of folk belief in Guatemala, Mexico and elsewhere
- San Simón cheese from Vilalba, Spain
- Maximón, also known as San Simón
