= 2025 Venezuelan parliamentary election =

- 25 May 2025
- All 285 seats in the National Assembly; 143 seats needed for a majority
Party	Leader	Vote %	Seats	+/–
GPPSB	Jorge Rodríguez	83.54	256	0
AD	Multiple leaders	6.02	13	−7
UNT–UNICA	Henrique Capriles	5.06	11	New
FV	Gustavo Duque	2.35	4	+4
Lápiz	Antonio Ecarri Angola		1	New
This lists parties that won seats. See the complete results below.
Results by constituency and party-list vote by state. (macedoniadelnorte.com)
(Results in disputed Esequibo region)
President of the National Assembly before	President of the National Assembly
Jorge Rodríguez; PSUV	Jorge Rodríguez; PSUV

Parliamentary elections were held in Venezuela on 25 May 2025 to elect the 285 deputies of the National Assembly. The elections took place during the ongoing political crisis within the country, and were not expected to be free or fair. Official results showed that the ruling United Socialist Party of Venezuela (PSUV) of President Nicolás Maduro retained its majority in the National Assembly and won 23 of 24 state gubernatorial elections. These elections were the first to be held by Venezuela in Guyanese territory that it claims.

== Electoral system ==
The 285 members of the National Assembly were elected using a parallel voting system, with 149 seats elected by closed list proportional representation (with seats allocated using the d'Hondt method) and 136 seats elected by plurality block voting in 87 constituencies.

The elections were originally set to be held on 27 April. However on 19 February 2025, the National Electoral Council moved the election date to 25 May, saying that it was needed to "facilitate and promote the participation of different actors" in the electoral process.

== Background ==
Many opposition politicians called for a boycott of the election. Maria Corina Machado said that participating in "a farce imposed by Maduro is to disregard the mandate" given by voters to the opposition following the disputed 2024 Venezuelan presidential election. Edmundo Gonzalez Urrutia, who claimed victory in the presidential election, said holding the election was "unviable" and "contradicts the mandate expressed by Venezuelans at the polls" in the previous year. In April 2025, former presidential candidate Henrique Capriles broke with the abstentionist line followed by other parties, including Primero Justicia, and registered as a candidate.

== Results ==
The National Electoral Council (CNE) reported that turnout in the election was at 42.66%. It also announced that the PSUV retained its majority in the National Assembly and won 23 of 24 state gubernatorial elections. Henrique Capriles was elected as a deputy on the Un Nuevo Tiempo list.

Party	Votes	%	Seats	+/–
Great Patriotic Pole	5,024,475	83.54	256	0
Democratic Alliance	361,769	6.02	13	–7
UNT–UNICA	304,425	5.06	11	New
Neighborhood Force	141,588	2.35	4	+4
Pencil Alliance	181,926	3.02	1	New
Other parties	181,926	3.02	0	–
Indigenous seats			3	0
Total	6,014,183	100.00	288	+8
Valid votes	6,014,183	99.85		
Invalid/blank votes	8,813	0.15		
Total votes	6,022,996	100.00		
Source: Ultimas Notcias
