= Union and Change =

Union and Change Unión y Cambio
- Abbreviation: UNICA
- Leaders: Henrique Capriles; Tomás Guanipa
- Founders: Henrique Capriles; Tomás Guanipa
- Founded: 25 April 2025
- Split from: Justice First
- Youth wing: Unica Juvenil
- Ideology: Progressivism; Humanism; Antichavismo
- Political position: Centre to centre-left
- National affiliation: UNT-UNICA
- Colours: Yellow-green; Blue
- Slogan: ¡Aquí nadie se rinde!
- National Assembly: 11 / 285 (UNT-UNICA)
- Governors: 1 / 24
- State legislatures: 4 / 260
- Mayors: 50 / 335
- Municipal legislatures: 77 / 2,571

Website
- Facebook page

The Union and Change (Spanish: Unión y Cambio; UNICA) is a Venezuelan centrist political party formed in April 2025 by a group of opposition members led by Henrique Capriles and Tomás Guanipa, after their departure from Justice First.

== History ==
On 24 April 2025, at an event held in Zulia state, the Union and Change movement was officially launched, positioning itself as "an alternative for those who refuse to abandon the path of participation."

On the eve of the 2025 Venezuelan parliamentary election, the movement formed an alliance with Un Nuevo Tiempo. UNT-UNICA alliance won 11 seats in the National Assembly.
