= Pencil Alliance =

Pencil Alliance Alianza del Lápiz
- Leader: Antonio Ecarri
- Founded: 2017
- Ideology: Patriotism; Ordoliberalism; Anti-Chavismo
- Political position: Centre
- National Assembly: 1 / 285
- Governors: 0 / 23
- Mayors: 2 / 335

Website
- Official website

The Pencil Alliance (known as Pencil, in Spanish: Alianza del Lápiz) is a centrist Venezuelan political party founded on November 1, 2017. It currently has two mayors in the municipalities of San Sebastián and Libertador in the state of Aragua. It also has a council member in the Libertador Municipality of Caracas, along with other council members throughout the country.

== History ==
The party participated for the first time in Venezuela's 2021 regional elections, where its main candidate and president of the political organization, Antonio Ecarri, finished second for the mayoralty of the Libertador Municipality of Caracas, losing to the ruling PSUV party and beating the candidate of the Democratic Unity Roundtable, establishing itself as the leading opposition force in the country's capital.

The Pencil Alliance, Cambiemos, Progressive Advance, and National Integrity Movement (Min-Unidad) parties decided to submit Antonio Ecarri's nomination to the National Electoral Council (CNE) on March 22, 2024, as a candidate for the presidential elections scheduled for July 28, 2024.

== Ideology ==
The party defines itself as "a social and political movement inspired by the political thought of Arturo Uslar Pietri, Luis Beltrán Pietro Figueroa and Cecilio Acosta, which seeks the transformation of Venezuela through education."

== Trajectory ==
The Pencil Alliance established itself as an opposition party removed from the dynamics of the Democratic Unity Roundtable, participating in the 2021 Venezuelan regional elections with its own candidate, Antonio Ecarri, bringing with it discontent from sectors of the opposition.

== See also ==
- List of political parties in Venezuela
