= Cambiemos Movimiento Ciudadano =

Political party in Venezuela

Cambiemos Movimiento Ciudadano Let's Change - Citizen's Movement
- Founded: 11 May 2018; 7 years ago
- Split from: Un Nuevo Tiempo
- Headquarters: Av. Francisco de Miranda, Torre Mene Grande, Piso PB, Municipio Chacao, Caracas
- Ideology: Progressivism; Feminism
- Political position: Centre-left
- National affiliation: Democratic Alliance
- International affiliation: Progressive Alliance
- Colors: Purple
- Seats in the National Assembly: 1 / 285
- Seats in the Latin American Parliament: 1 / 12
- Seats in the Mercosur Parliament: 1 / 23
- Governors: 0 / 23
- Mayor: 15 / 335

Website
- http://cambiemos.org/

Cambiemos Movimiento Ciudadano (English: Let's Change - Citizen's Movement) is a Venezuelan political party with a pluralist and progressive tendency founded on 11 May 2018. This movement belongs to the opposition coalition Agreement for Change.

== Political philosophy ==
On their website they describe themselves as a "progressive court" organization. On the other hand, they have chosen to defend a policy based on dialogue, peace, coexistence and reconciliation; which they consider necessary for a “full democracy” and an “economy of opportunities and solidarity”.

In addition, they are opposed to abstentionism and in favor of citizen political participation. It also defends the rights of women and the LGBT community. At the socioeconomic level, Cambiemos defends the participation of private companies in conjunction with public policies that have a deep social meaning», while trusting in entrepreneurship "that unleashes the creative spirit of the common citizen that makes it an actor subject of change."

== History ==
According to its website, Cambiemos was founded in May 2018 as a result "of a long debate of its promoters on the need to build alternatives to the serious situation that Venezuela has experienced in recent years, marked by polarization and confrontation."

In April 2018, still without being a party, they reject the abstention line of other sectors of the opposition before the 2018 presidential elections, allying themselves with other movements and parties with which they would later found the Concertación por el Cambio coalition.

In May 2018, they are consolidated as a parliamentary fraction made up of the deputies Melva Paredes (Aragua), Maribel Guedez (Barinas), Adolfo Superlano (Barinas), Timoteo Zambrano (Zulia) and Mary Álvarez (Zulia). A month later, they are legalized as a party by the National Electoral Council (CNE).

== National Assembly deputies ==
=== Main ===
- Melva Paredes - Aragua
- Adolfo Superlano (expelled) - Barinas
- Maribel Guédez - Barinas
- José Antonio Spain (expelled) - Delta Amacuro
- José Gregorio Aparicio (expelled) - Sucre
- Timoteo Zambrano (does not attend the AN) - Zulia

=== Substitutes ===
- Mary Alvarez - Zulia

== Electoral history ==
After being legalized as a political movement before the CNE, the party participated for the first time in Venezuelan elections in the 2018 municipal elections, a contest where the 2459 councilors in the country would be elected, of which Cambie would obtain 2 seats in the Arismendi municipality in Barinas. The results by state and the percentage of participation are shown below:

Year	Votes	%	Councilors
2018	28,677	0.5	6 / 2,459
