= Alfredo Díaz Figueroa =

Venezuelan politician (1969–2025)

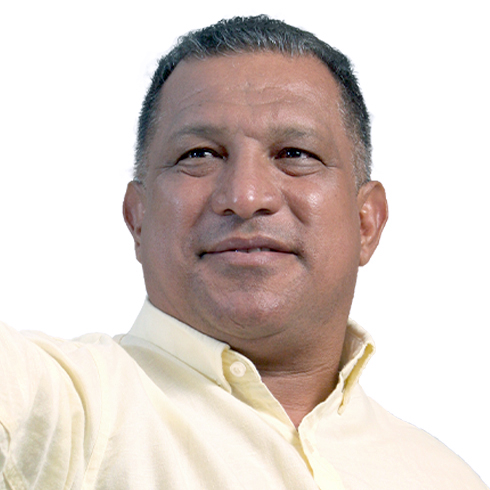
Alfredo Diaz Figueroa

Alfredo Javier Díaz Figueroa (August 3, 1969 – December 6, 2025) was a Venezuelan politician, governor of Nueva Esparta between 2017 and 2021.

== Early life and career ==
Alfredo Díaz Figueroa was born on Margarita Island on August 3, 1969. He completed his higher studies at the Universidad de Oriente (UDO), where he graduated as a technician in tourism business administration. He had been a member of the Democratic Action party since 1995.

On November 23, 2008, Díaz won the regional elections for mayor of the municipality of Mariño with 48% of the votes (19,960). On December 8, 2013, he was re-elected mayor of the municipality of Mariño in the municipal elections with 54.35% of the votes (28,032), taking office again as mayor on December 10 of that same year.

On October 15, 2017, he was elected governor of the state of Nueva Esparta with 117,430 votes, equivalent to 51.87% of the total registered in the state. According to the first bulletin of the National Electoral Council (CNE), Carlos Mata Figueroa, of the United Socialist Party of Venezuela (PSUV), obtained 106,783 votes, equivalent to 47.46%. Díaz's candidacy was presented in alliance with other organizations of the Democratic Unity Roundtable (MUD). On October 23, 2017, he was sworn in with the National Constituent Assembly to the position he was elected, receiving strong criticism.

== Arrest and death ==
On November 24, 2024, Díaz was detained after disappearing because of the Bolivarian National Intelligence Service (SEBIN). His wife, Leynys Malavé, denounced that he was arrested in Ospino, Portuguesa state, when he was traveling by land to leave the country.

Díaz died on December 5, 2025, at the age of 56, while detained at the headquarters of SEBIN, known as El Helicoide, in Caracas.
