= San Diego Municipality, Carabobo =

San Diego Municipality Municipio San Diego
- Municipality
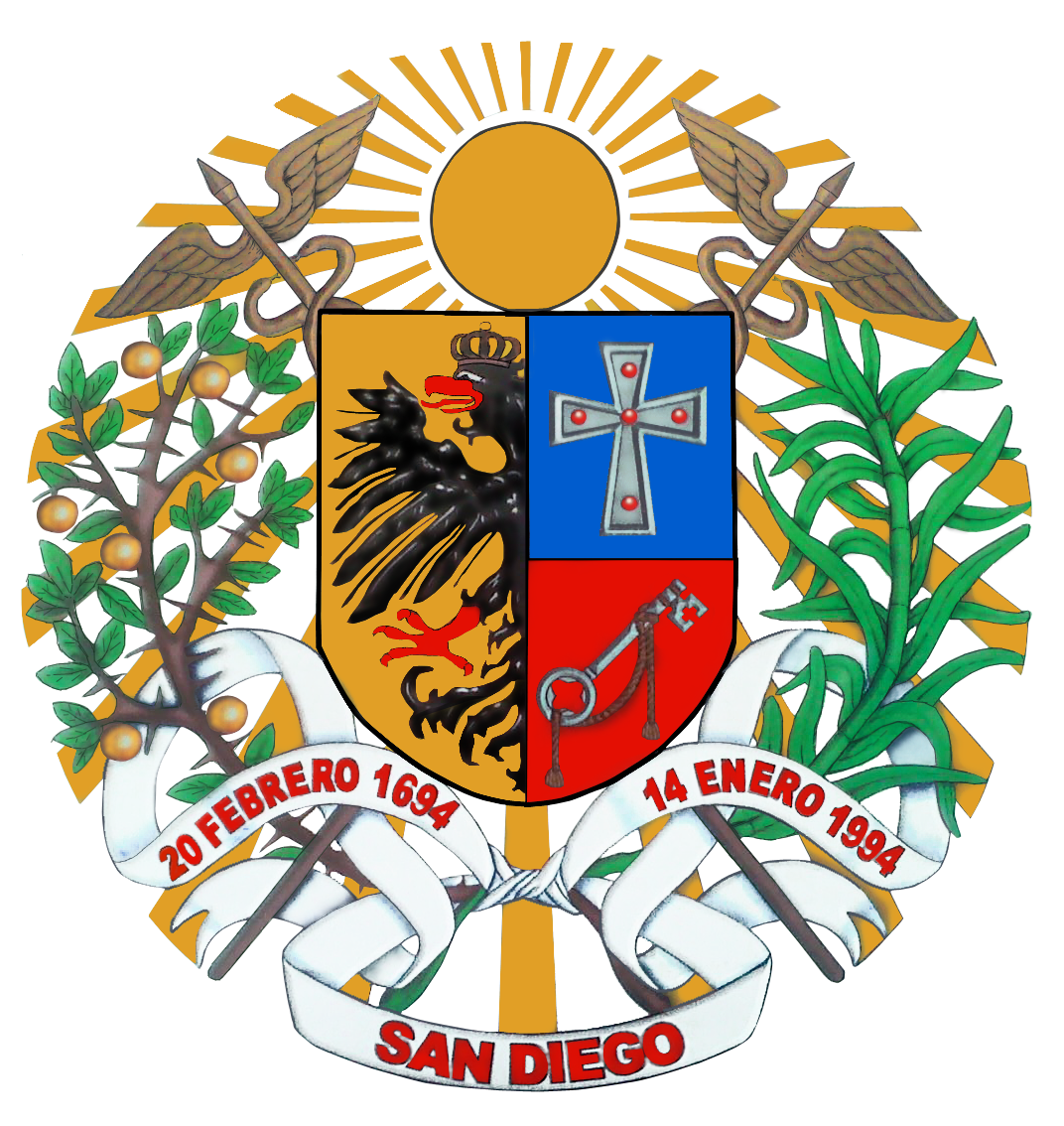
- Flag Coat of arms

- Location in Carabobo

- Location in Venezuela
- Coordinates: 10°15′37″N 67°57′19″W
- Country: Venezuela
- State: Carabobo
- Municipal seat: San Diego

Government
  - Mayor: León Jurado (Fuerza Vecinal)

Area
  - Total: 113.2 km^{2} (43.7 sq mi)

Population (2011)
  - Total: 93,257
  - Density: 823.8/km^{2} (2,134/sq mi)
- Time zone: UTC−4 (VET)
- Area code(s): 0241
- Website: Official website

The San Diego Municipality is one of the 14 municipalities (municipios) that makes up the Venezuelan state of Carabobo and, according to the 2011 census by the National Institute of Statistics of Venezuela, the municipality has a population of 93,257. The town of San Diego is the municipal seat of the San Diego Municipality.

== Geography ==
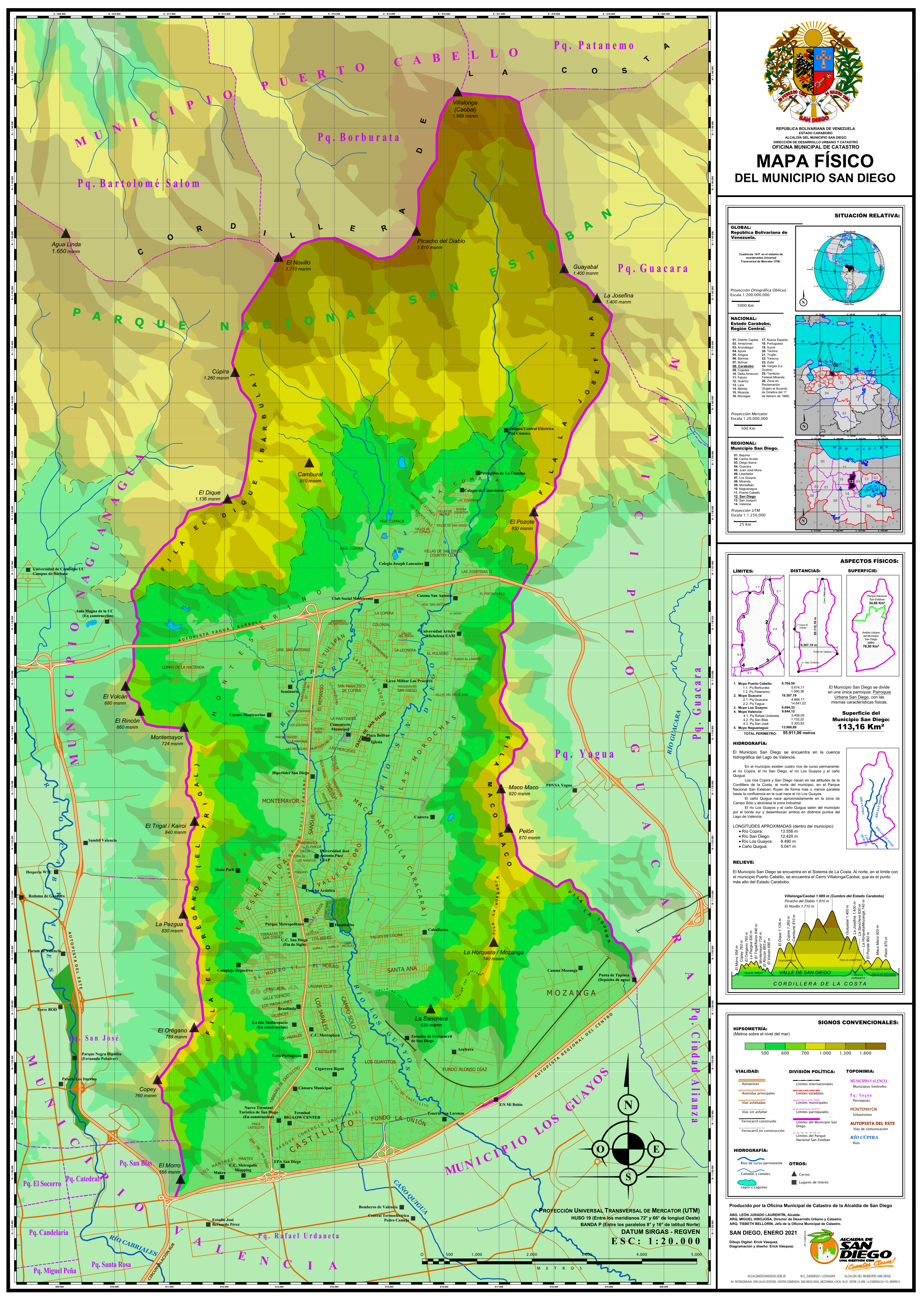
Physical map of the Municipality of San Diego.

The San Diego river, coming from the Northern mountains, crosses the city in its way to the Valencia Lake.

== Places of interest ==
- San Diego's church is a well-preserved colonial church.
- The area around the San Diego church, around the Bolívar Square, also keep the traditional architecture.

== Economy ==
The city was the centre of an agricultural region. It has grown very rapidly in recent years. Many of the areas previously used for agriculture have been taken over by further urbanizations. Now the service industry has overtaken agriculture as the area's main source of income.

== Demographics ==
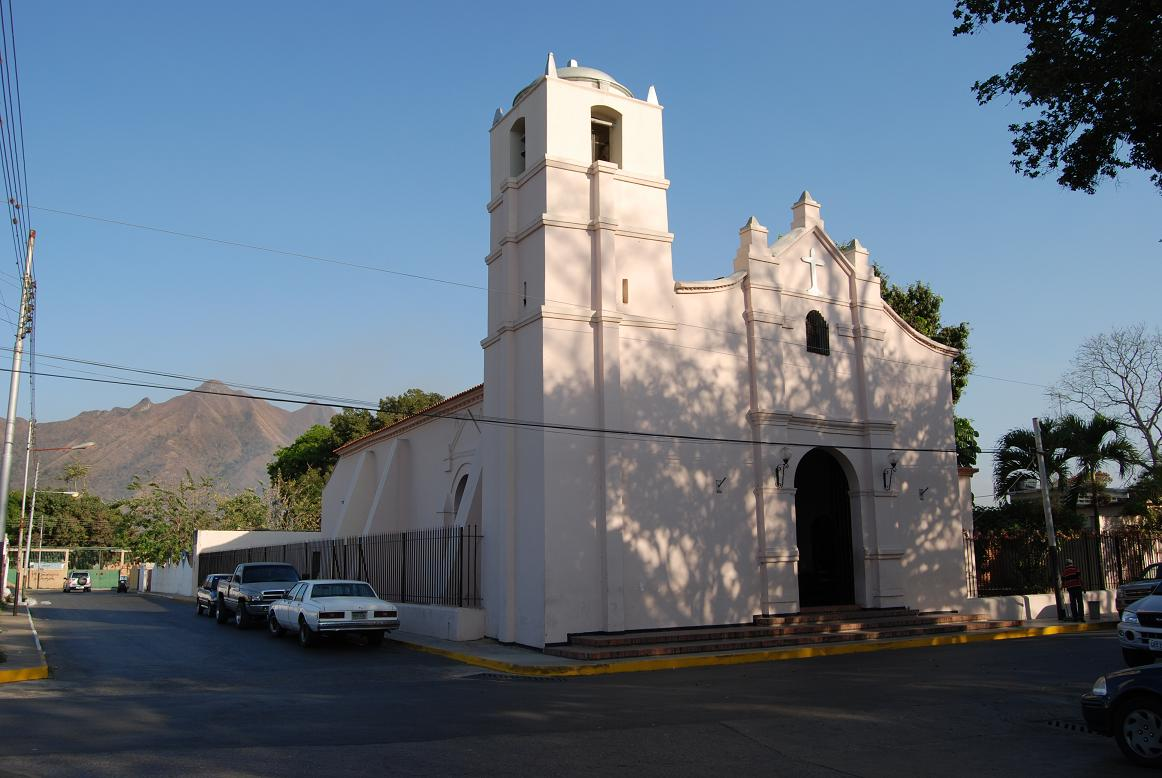
San Diego church

The San Diego Municipality, according to a 2007 population estimate by the National Institute of Statistics of Venezuela, has a population of 74,941 (up from 60,330 in 2000). This amounts to 3.4% of the state's population. The municipality's population density is 706.99 inhabitants per square kilometre (1,831.1/sq mi).

== Government ==
In San Diego there is the mayor's office of the Municipality of San Diego located in C.C. San Diego popularly known as Fin de Siglo. First mayor of San Diego José Gregorio Ruiz. (1995-2004) (2 periods) main parties that supported him: AD, SEGUIMOS.

The current mayor is León Jurado (ConEnzo), democratically elected with 49.05% [3] The previous mayor, Vicencio Scarano (2004-2014), was dismissed from his position for failing to comply with a ruling of the Supreme Court of Justice, in the who was asked to lift the barricades made during the demonstrations in the municipality in 2014. Elections were held on May 25, 2014 to restore him (with his wife Rosa De Scarano as the winner with 88%).

== Education ==
- Universidad José Antonio Paez (University)
- Universidad Arturo Michelena (University)
- Instituto Tecnológico de Seguridad Industrial (College)
- Colegio Universitario Monseñor de Talavera (College)
- Unidad Educativa San Diego de Alcala
- Unidad Educativa Monseñor Luis Eduardo Henríquez.
- Unidad Educativa Colegio Joseph Lancaster.
- Unidad Educativa Colegio Las Californias.
- Unidad Educativa Hipolito Cisneros.
- Unidad Educativa Colegio Patria Bolivariana.
- Unidad Educativa Olga Bayone.
