= Neighborhood Force =

Neighborhood Force Fuerza Vecinal
- Abbreviation: FV
- President: Gustavo Duque
- General Secretary: Máximo Sánchez
- Founded: 26 June 2021
- Split from: Justice First
- Headquarters: Capital District, Caracas
- Ideology: Big tent Localism; Progressivism
- Political position: Centre
- Colours: Blue; White; Dark blue
- National Assembly: 4 / 285
- Mayors: 10 / 335
- Governors: 1 / 23

Party flag
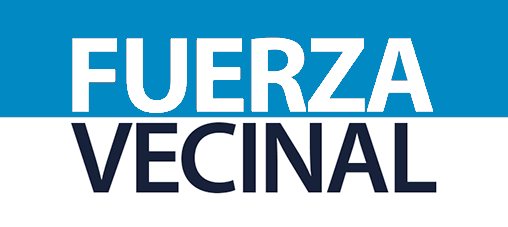

Website
- fuerzavecinal.com

The Neighborhood Force (Spanish: Fuerza Vecinal; FV) is a centrist and localist Venezuelan political party, founded by a group of mayors and political leaders of the country on June 26, 2021. The party governs throughout eastern Caracas — in the municipalities of Baruta, El Hatillo, Los Salias and Chacao — less in the Sucre Municipality. The party also governs the municipalities of Diego Bautista Urbaneja and Maneiro, in eastern Venezuela.

== Ideology ==
The party defines itself as "a democratic political organization, a humanistic, plural and inclusive center that is born from the neighbors for the neighbors." In addition, the party claims to defend electoral participation, gender equality, feminism, sexual diversity, environmental care and freedom of expression on its website, also promoting neighborhood organization for the contribution and development of the municipal government.

== History ==
Electoral card of this political party from 2021.

On June 26, 2021, the mayor of Chacao, Gustavo Duque, gathered in the Plaza Altamira in Caracas with the mayors León Jurado of San Diego, Elías Sayegh of El Hatillo, Manuel Ferreira of Lecheria, Josy Fernández of Los Salias, Morel Rodríguez of Maneiro, Gustavo Delgado of San Cristóbal, Leonel Cegarra of Andrés Bello, and Darwin González of Baruta announced the creation of the FV party.

The party was created mainly as a unitary card of the opposition mayors and political leaders for the 2021 regional elections, in case the Democratic Unity Roundtable declined to participate. The party not only nominated candidates for mayors, councilors and legislative councils, but it also nominated former Baruta councilor David Uzcátegui for the governorship of Miranda.

In August 2021, Neighborhood Force promoted the holding of primary elections to elect unitary candidates for the 2021 regional elections. David Uzcátegui proposed a primary together with Carlos Ocariz, candidate of Justice First, who has the support of the Democratic Unity Roundtable. The party also began a collection of signatures to demonstrate the alleged support of the population for the organization of the opposition primaries. Ocariz and Uzcátegui agreed to carry out four surveys of the Mirandian population, and whoever won more than three was the unit candidate for the MUD. Uzcátegui won three of the polls, although Ocariz refused to acknowledge his victory and refused to give up his candidacy. Finally, on November 11, 2021, Ocariz withdrew in favor of Uzcátegui, positioning Fuerza Vecinal as Miranda's largest party, both in terms of mayors in office and in candidacies.
