= San Diego, Carabobo =

San Diego
- Shire Town
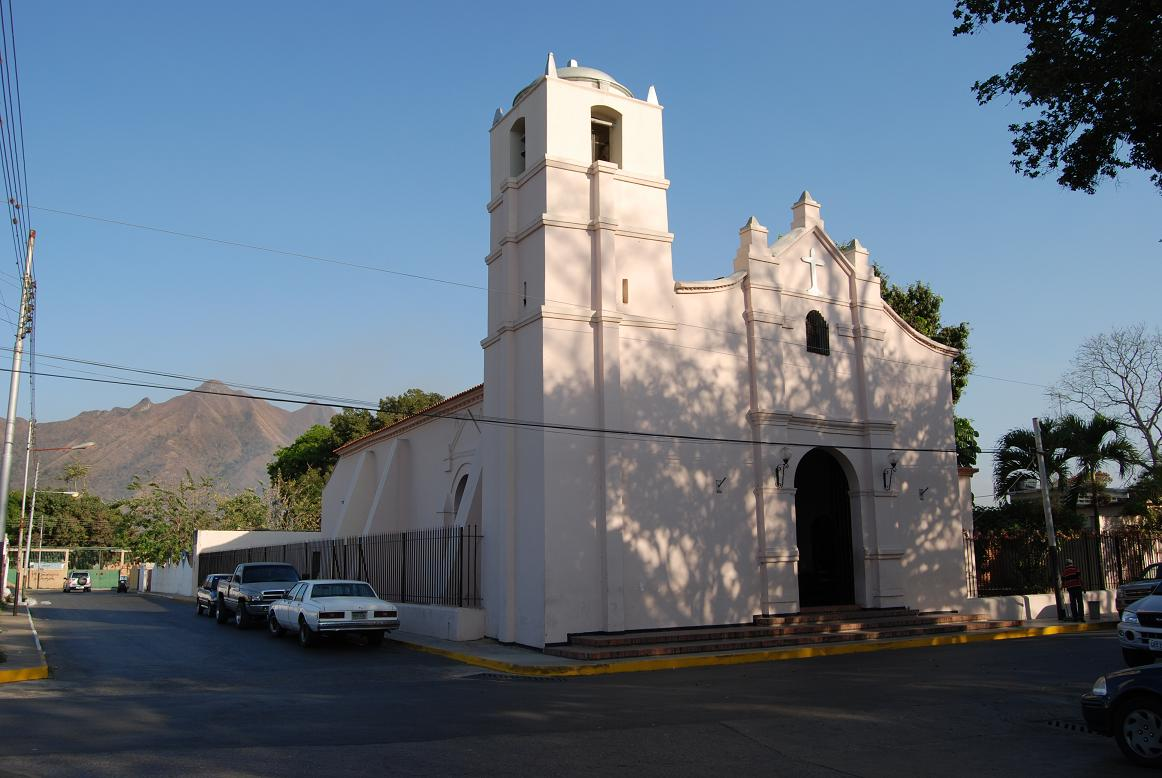

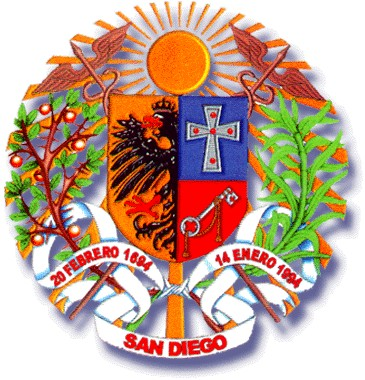
- Coat of arms

- Location in Venezuela
- Coordinates: 10°15′14.5″N 68°0′39.08″W
- Country: Venezuela
- State: Carabobo
- Municipality: San Diego Municipality
- Founded: 7 November 1781

Area
  - Shire Town: 106 sq mi (275 km^{2})

Population (2008)
  - Metro: 187,215
- Time zone: UTC−4 (VET)
- Climate: Aw

San Diego is a town, capital of San Diego Municipality. It is located to the North of Valencia Lake in Carabobo State, Venezuela.

The town was the centre of an agricultural region. It has grown very fast in recent years. Many of the areas previously used for agriculture have been taken over by further urbanizations. Now the service industry has overtaken agriculture as main source of income.

The total population of the municipality according to the 2011 census is around 93,257 inhabitants.

== Geography ==
It is located in the northwest of Valencia City, in lands of sedentary, diluvial origin, it belongs to Valencia Lake basin, perfect for the development of agricultural activities. The San Diego River, coming from the Northern mountains, runs through the town in its way to the Valencia Lake.

== Places of interest ==
- San Diego's church is a well-preserved colonial church.
- The area around the San Diego church, around the Bolívar Square, also keep the traditional architecture
- Pozo la Cumaca and Waterfall, a sparkling clean river with a large swimming well and a water fall higher up the hill. Note: to enter the waterfall you must ask the park ranger for permission as it is not open to everyone. A place to hang out and chill from the heat, services available. An all-terrain vehicle is necessary to get to this place.

== See also ==
- List of cities and towns in Venezuela
