= San Cristóbal Municipality =

San Cristóbal Municipality Municipio San Cristóbal
- Municipality
- Flag Seal

- Location in Táchira

- Location in Venezuela
- Coordinates: 7°44′22″N 72°11′02″W
- Country: Venezuela
- State: Táchira
- Municipal seat: San Cristóbal

Government
  - Mayor: Silfredo Zambrano ((PSUV))

Area
  - Total: 226.6 km^{2} (87.5 sq mi)

Population (2011 -> 2019 projection)
  - Total: 263,765 -> 288,556
  - Density: 1,164/km^{2} (3,015/sq mi)
- Time zone: UTC−4 (VET)

San Cristóbal Municipality is one of the 29 municipalities of the state of Táchira in Venezuela. The city of San Cristóbal is the administrative center of the San Cristóbal Municipality, which is also the state capital.

== Demographics ==
Based on the 2011 Venezuelan census, The population of the San Cristóbal Municipality was 263,765 people, accounting for 22.57% of the total population of the state of Táchira. Covering an area of 241 km², the municipality had a population density of 1,094.46 inhabitants/km², significantly higher than the national average of 29.71 and the state average of 105.31. By June 2019, official projections from the Venezuelan Statistics National Institute estimated the population as 288,556 people, representing an annual growth rate of 0.60% since 2011 and increasing the population density to 1,197 inhabitants/km². However, these projections do not account for the impact of emigration linked to the country's recent economic and political circumstances.

The gender distribution of the population was 48.08% men (126,827) and 51.92% women (136,938). There were 38.49% of households headed by a woman and on average the number of children per woman of reproductive age was 1.8, slightly below the national average of 2.

The age distribution showed that the largest segment of the population was aged 15 to 64, comprising 70.9% of the people. Younger people aged 0 to 14 made up 20.3% of the population, while those aged 65 and older accounted for 8.8%. The municipality is almost entirely urbanized, with 98.6% of inhabitants (260,173) living in urban centers compared to just 1.4% (3,592) in rural areas.

Ethnically, the municipality identified as predominantly White people (64.5%) and Mestizo (33.1%). Minority groups included 0.8% Afro-Venezuelans, a small indigenous population of 118 individuals, and 1.5% belonging to other ethnic groups.

The literacy rate was 97.8%, with 4,953 inhabitants of San Cristóbal not able to read or write. Internet access was available in 47.11% of households, and 55.37% of the households possessed at least one computer. 72.12% of households had landline telephone service and 72.89% of households had cable television. Media was quite accessible with 85.38% of households owning at least one radio and 97.34% owning a television. Basic appliances were quite common with 94.89% of households owning a refrigerator, 96.78% owning a stove, and 79.08% a washing machine. However, only 12.80% of households owned a clothes dryer, 24.24% a water heater, and 16.32% air conditioning.

== Agriculture ==
The San Cristóbal Municipality, with the seat San Cristóbal at its centre, has agricultural lands producing cotton, cereal, maize, coffee, and sugarcane.

== Road infrastructure ==
The San Cristóbal Municipality is served by several main roads, including the Transandean Highway and the Pan-American Highway.
