= 2018 Venezuelan municipal elections =

- 9 December 2018

2,459 councillors
- Registered: 20,704,612
- Turnout: 27.40% (▼30.96pp) (Note: Official results per the National Electoral Council.)
Alliance	GPPSB	Concertación
Popular vote	4,324,602	1,160,493
Percentage	76.23%	20.45%
Swing	▲27.54pp	New
Councillors	326	9
Councillors +/–	▲20	New
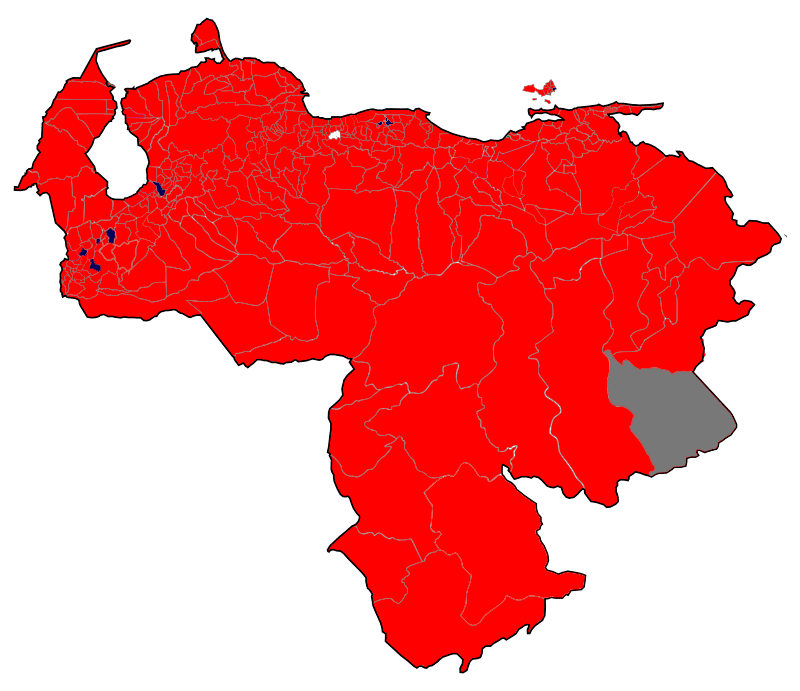
- Results by municipality

Municipal elections were held in Venezuela on 9 December 2018, aimed at choosing only the 2459 municipality councillors of Venezuela.

== Background ==
Following the 2018 Venezuelan presidential election, municipal elections were quickly organized throughout Venezuela. The National Electoral Council proposed the election date of 9 December 2018, which in turn was approved by the Constituent National Assembly on 13 July 2018.

== Conduct ==
Many voting centers were seen empty due to low participation. Members of the state-run CLAP were ordered to participate in the elections with the government offering food products to those who were involved.

== Results ==
Official results showed that only 27.4% of eligible voters participated in the election compared to 47.3% in 2017.
