= Diego Bautista Urbaneja Municipality =

Diego Bautista Urbaneja Municipality Municipio Diego Bautista Urbaneja
- Municipality
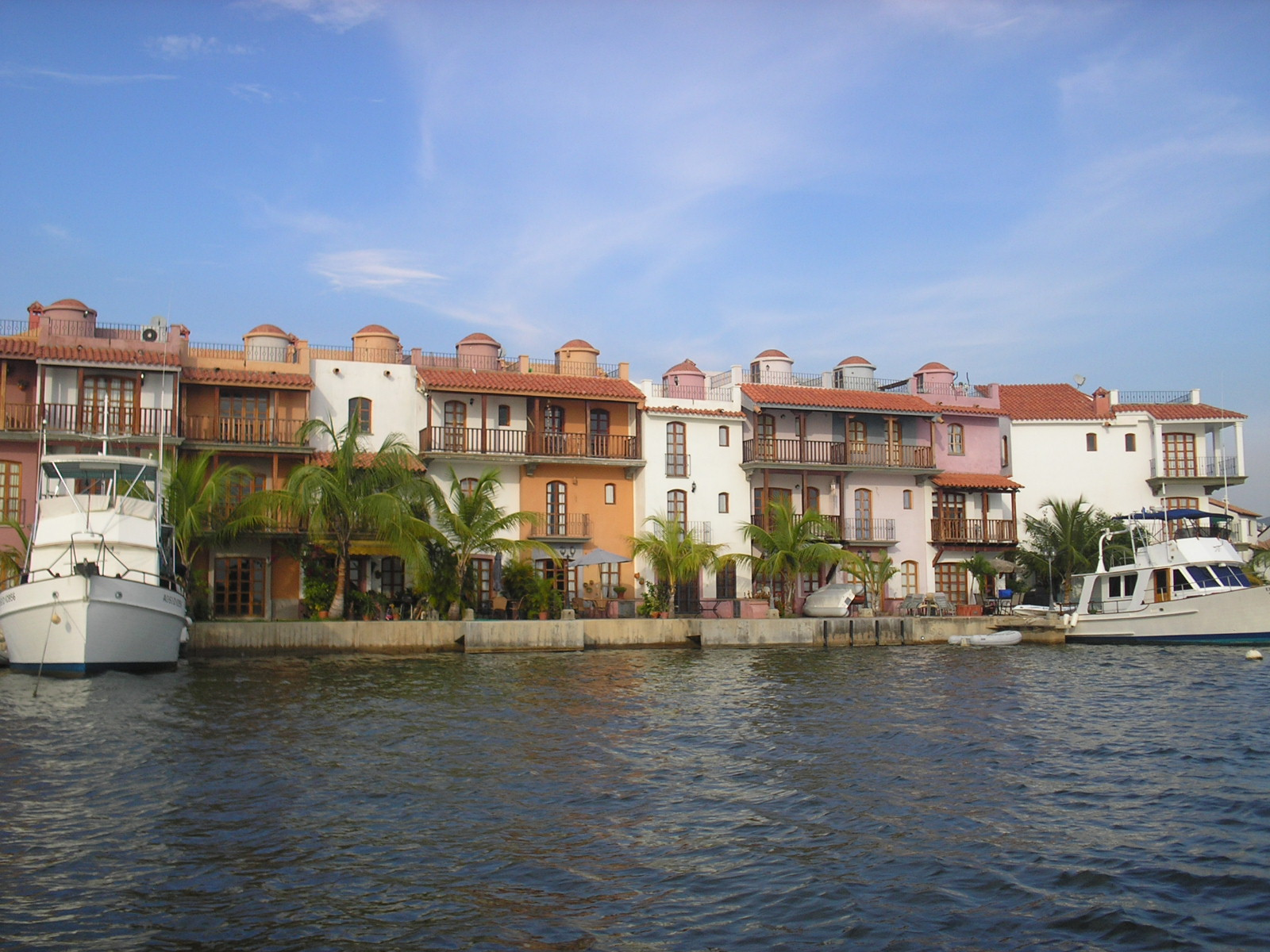
- Houses in Lechería

- Flag Coat of arms

- Location in Anzoátegui

- Location in Venezuela
- Coordinates: 10°11′26″N 64°40′51″W
- Country: Venezuela
- State: Anzoátegui

Government
  - Mayor: Manuel Ferreira González (FV)

Area
  - Total: 68.6 km^{2} (26.5 sq mi)

Population (2011)
  - Total: 37,829
  - Density: 551/km^{2} (1,430/sq mi)
- Time zone: UTC−4 (VET)
- Area code(s): 0281
- Website: Official website

The Diego Bautista Urbaneja Municipality is one of the 21 municipalities (municipios) that makes up the eastern Venezuelan state of Anzoátegui and, according to the 2011 census by the National Institute of Statistics of Venezuela, the municipality has a population of 37,829. The town of Lechería is the shire town of the Diego Bautista Urbaneja Municipality. The municipality is named for the independence hero Diego Bautista Urbaneja.

== History ==
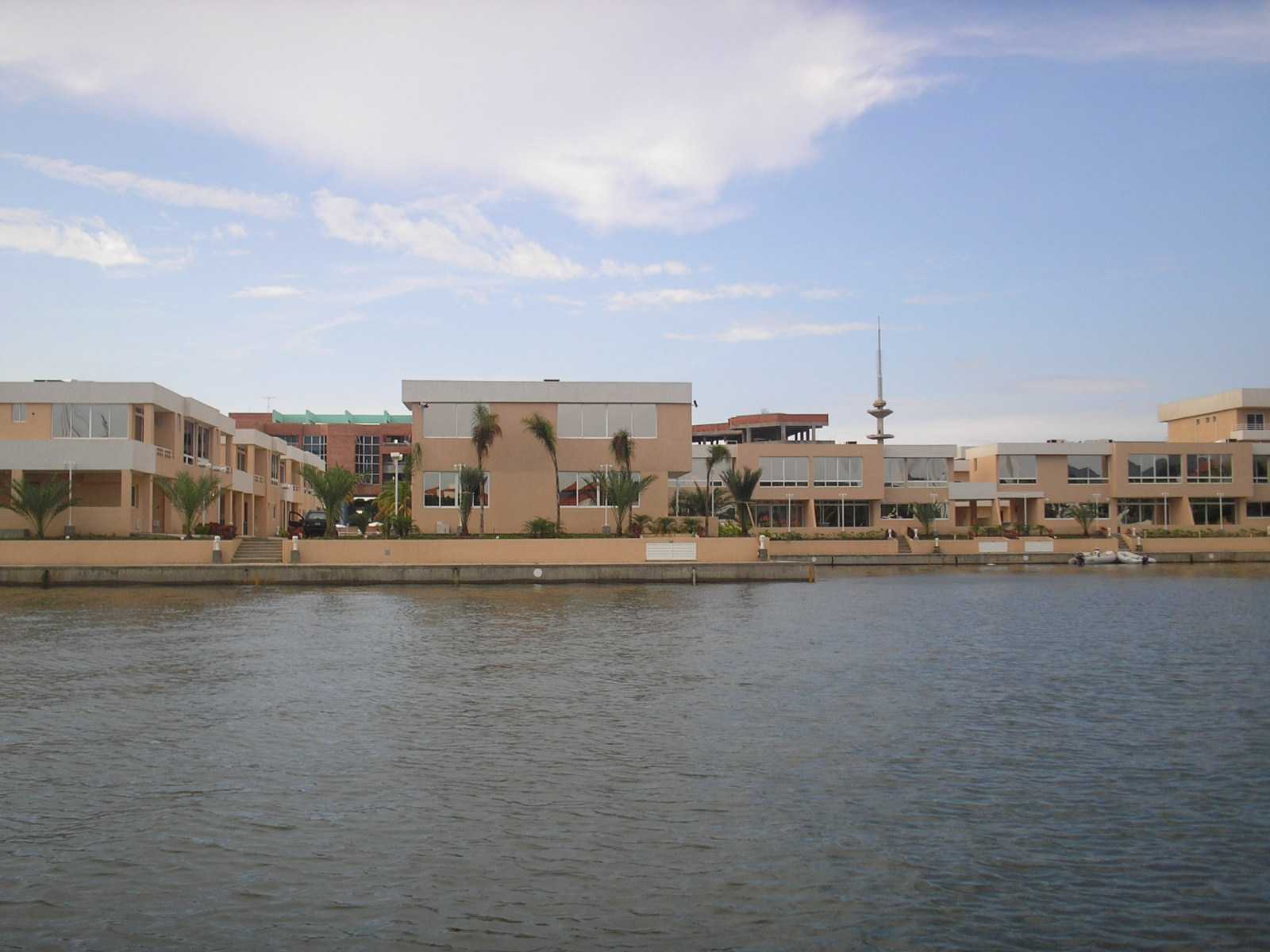
Puerto Morro urbanization in Lechería

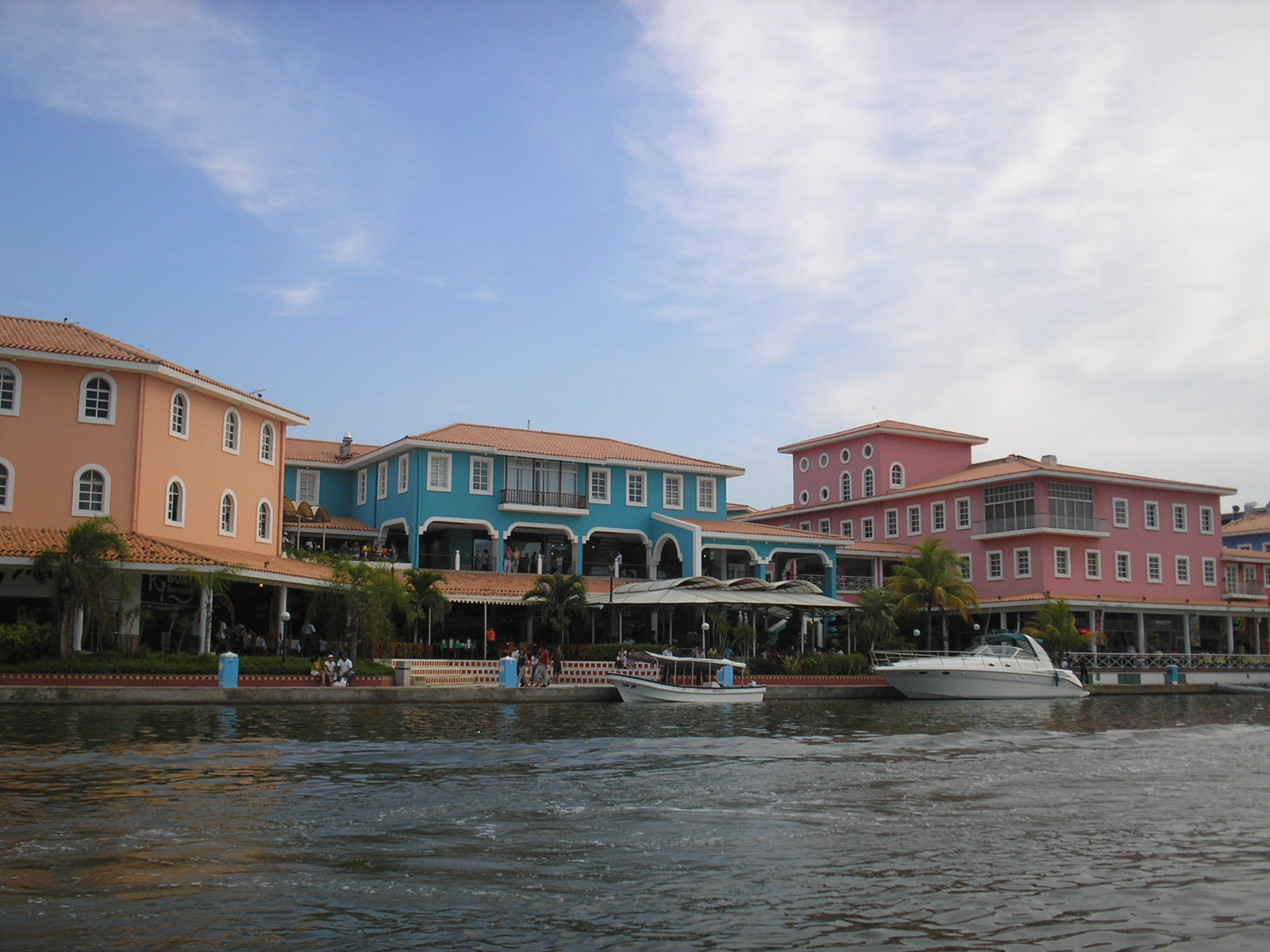
C.C Plaza Mayor

The town of Lechería was founded as San Miguel de Neverí in 1535, but resistance from native groups, among them being the Cumanagotos, caused the town to be abandoned one year later by the Spaniards.

The current town of Lechería made its prominence after the Spanish Crown ordered the construction of the Fortín de la Magdalena fort in order to prevent pirate attacks on sailors that took the Barcelona-Cumaná route (the fort was completed in 1799 and is located on the Cerro el Morro). Later, in 1817 during the Venezuelan War of Independence, Simón Bolívar briefly occupied the fort and then, in 1819, the fort was captured by General Rafael Urdaneta and his men.

By the middle of the 19th century, the region was developed into a big goat milk producer in order to meet the needs of the growing population of Barcelona. From this moment on, the town became known as Lechería. Later, a major fishing industry was also developed.

On 12 September 1967, Daniel Octavio Camejo founded the Compañía Anónima para el Desarrollo de la Zona Turística de Oriente (CAZTOR) with the intention to develop tourism in the region on a grand scale, resulting in major construction projects to commence. Its strategic location between Barcelona and Puerto la Cruz accelerated its growth toward the end of the 1990s.

== Demographics ==
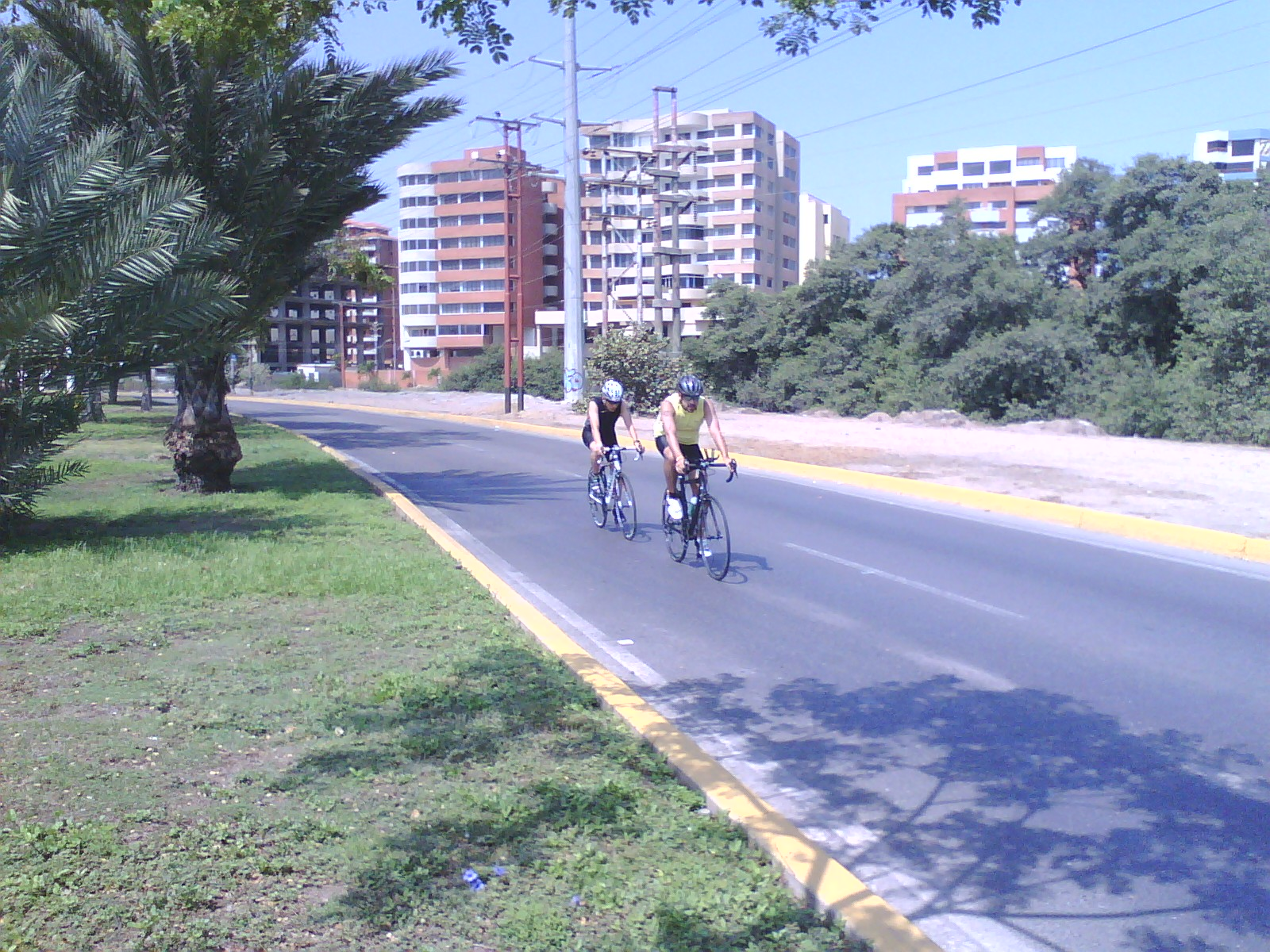
Street in Lechería

The Diego Bautista Urbaneja Municipality, according to a 2007 population estimate by the National Institute of Statistics of Venezuela, has a population of 26,265 (up from 22,177 in 2000). This amounts to 1.8% of the state's population. The municipality's population density is 2,188.75 inhabitants per square kilometre (5,668.8/sq mi).

== Government ==
The mayor of the Diego Bautista Urbaneja Municipality is Manuel Ferreira G, elected on 10 December 2017. He replaced Gustavo Marcano shortly after the elections. The municipality is divided into two parishes; Lechería and El Morro (previous to 27 June 1995, the Diego Bautista Urbaneja Municipality contained only a single parish).

== Sites of interest ==
- C.C. Plaza Mayor
- C.C. Caribbean Mall
- C.C. Aventura Plaza
- Cerro El Morro
- Paseo Colon
- Lido Beach
- National Park Mochima
- Fortín de la Magdalena

== See also ==
- Anzoátegui
- Municipalities of Venezuela
