= Carlos Mata Figueroa =

Carlos Mata
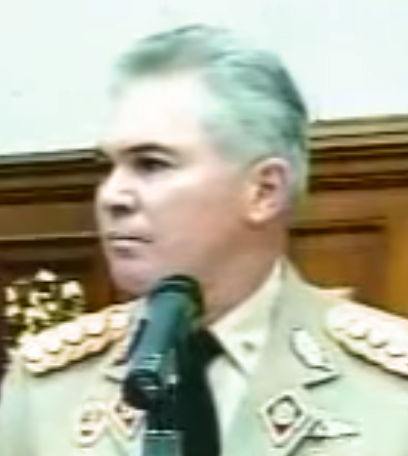

Minister of Defense of Venezuela
- In office 25 January 2010 – January 2012
- President: Hugo Chavez
- Preceded by: Ramón Carrizales
- Succeeded by: Henry Rangel Silva

Governor of Nueva Esparta
- In office 28 December 2012 – October 2017
- Preceded by: Morel Rodríguez
- Succeeded by: Alfredo Díaz

Personal details
- Party: United Socialist Party of Venezuela

Carlos José Mata Figueroa is a former Defence Minister of Venezuela from January 2010 to January 2012 and the Chief of the Venezuelan armed forces. He holds the rank of General in the Venezuelan Army.
