= Guaraque Municipality =

Guaraque Municipality Municipio Guaraque
- Municipality
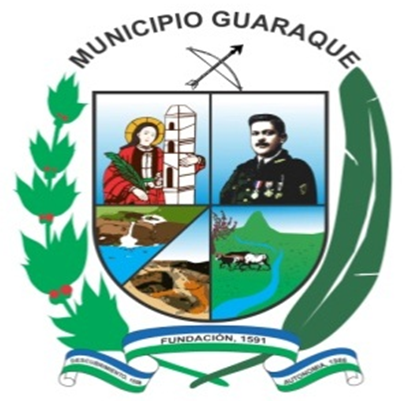
- Flag Coat of arms

- Location in Mérida

- Location in Venezuela
- Coordinates: 8°09′12″N 71°44′08″W
- Country: Venezuela
- State: Mérida

Government
  - Mayor: Jhondry Contreras Huiza (UNT)

Area
  - Total: 533 km^{2} (206 sq mi)

Population (2007)
  - Total: 9,965
  - Density: 18.7/km^{2} (48.4/sq mi)
- Time zone: UTC−4 (VET)
- Area code(s): 0275
- Website: Official website

The Guaraque Municipality is one of the 23 municipalities (municipios) that makes up the Venezuelan state of Mérida and, according to a 2007 population estimate by the National Institute of Statistics of Venezuela, the municipality has a population of 9,965. The town of Guaraque is the shire town of the Guaraque Municipality.

== History ==
The Guaraque Municipality became a part of the former Rivas Davila district (today Rivas Davila Municipality) in 1904. Later, in 1984, this area became the Autonomous Municipality of Guaraque, formed by the Mesa de Quintero and Río Negro Municipalities. In 1992, as a result of the modification of the territorial law, the current municipal parishes were created. The most popular celebration of the municipality are that of Santa Barbara that take place from November 23 until January 4.

== Geography ==
This is a mountainous region located in the Venezuelan Andes and part of the municipality is protected by the Páramos Batallón and La Negra national parks. The Negro, Guaraque, and El Molino rivers are the municipality's main bodies of water which have formed a valley at 1,500 meters above sea level, although most of the municipality is above 2,000 meters above sea level, with a maximum altitude of 3,532 meters above sea level.

== Demographics ==
The Guaraque Municipality, according to a 2007 population estimate by the National Institute of Statistics of Venezuela, has a population of 9,965 (up from 8,641 in 2000). This amounts to 1.2% of the state's population. The municipality's population density is 18.7 inhabitants per square kilometre (48/sq mi).

== Government ==
The mayor of the Guaraque Municipality is Carlos Alí Guerrero, elected on October 31, 2004, with 61% of the vote. He replaced Rosmel Javier Sanchez shortly after the elections. The municipality is divided into three parishes; Capital Guaraque, Mesa de Quintero, and Río Negro.
