= Simón Rodríguez Municipality, Táchira =

Simón Rodríguez Municipality Municipio Simón Rodríguez
- Municipality
- Flag Coat of arms

- Location in Táchira

- Location in Venezuela
- Coordinates: 8°19′44″N 71°51′06″W
- Country: Venezuela
- State: Táchira
- Municipal seat: San Simón

Government
  - Mayor: Carlos Márquez (COPEI)

Area
  - Total: 65.1 km^{2} (25.1 sq mi)

Population (2011 -> 2019 projection)
  - Total: 2,526 -> 2,658
  - Density: 38.8/km^{2} (100/sq mi)
- Time zone: UTC−4 (VET)
- Website: Official website

The Simón Rodríguez Municipality is one of the twenty-nine municipalities that composes the Táchira state in the Andes of Venezuela. Its municipal seat is the town of San Simón and its mayor is Carlos Márquez of COPEI since November 2021. According to the 2011 Venezuelan census, the population was 2,526 people.

== History ==
The historical origins of the Simón Rodríguez municipality trace back to 1657, when the region was discovered by Cristóbal Rosales and Manuel de Villalobos, who named it the Valley of the Yeguines and Buroquias (Spanish: Valle Yeguines y Buroquias) after groups of indigenous people. In 1850, the town San Simón was founded near the Escalante River. In 1874 it was designated as a municipality and in 1995 elevated to an autonomous municipality, adopting its name in honor of the prominent Venezuelan philosopher and educator Simón Rodríguez.

== Demographics ==
Based on the 2011 Venezuelan census, The population of the Simón Rodríguez Municipality was 2,526 people, accounting for 0.21% of the total population of the state of Táchira. By June 2019, official projections from the Venezuelan Statistics National Institute estimated the population of Simón Rodríguez as 2,658 people, representing an annual growth rate of 0.64% since 2011 and showing a population density of 38.52 inhabitants/km². However, these projections do not account for the impact of emigration linked to the country's recent economic and political circumstances.

The gender distribution of the population was 52.1% men (1,275) and 47.9% women (1,170). The age distribution showed that the largest segment of the population was aged 15 to 64, comprising 64.7% of the people. Younger people aged 0 to 14 made up 26.5% of the population, while those aged 65 and older accounted for 8.8%. The municipality is completely rural, with 100% of the population living in rural areas.

Ethnically, the municipality identified as predominantly White people (59.9%) and Mestizo (38.7%). There was also a minority groups of 34 Afro-Venezuelans individuals (1.4%). The literacy rate was 88.7%, with 231 inhabitants of Simón Rodríguez not able to read or write.

== Government ==
The first mayor of the Simón Rodríguez Municipality was Francisco Márquez, who was elected in 1995. The current mayor is Carlos Márquez of the COPEI party who was first elected in November 2021. He was re-elected for another term in July 2025.

The Simón Rodríguez Municipality is divided into seven barrios, with the town of San Simón serving as the municipal seat and administrative center. The other six are Buroquia, Capacho, El Alto, Loma del Rodeo, Mesa Grande, and Mesa Seca.
