= Antonio Pinto Salinas Municipality =

Antonio Pinto Salinas Municipality Municipio Antonio Pinto Salinas
- Municipality
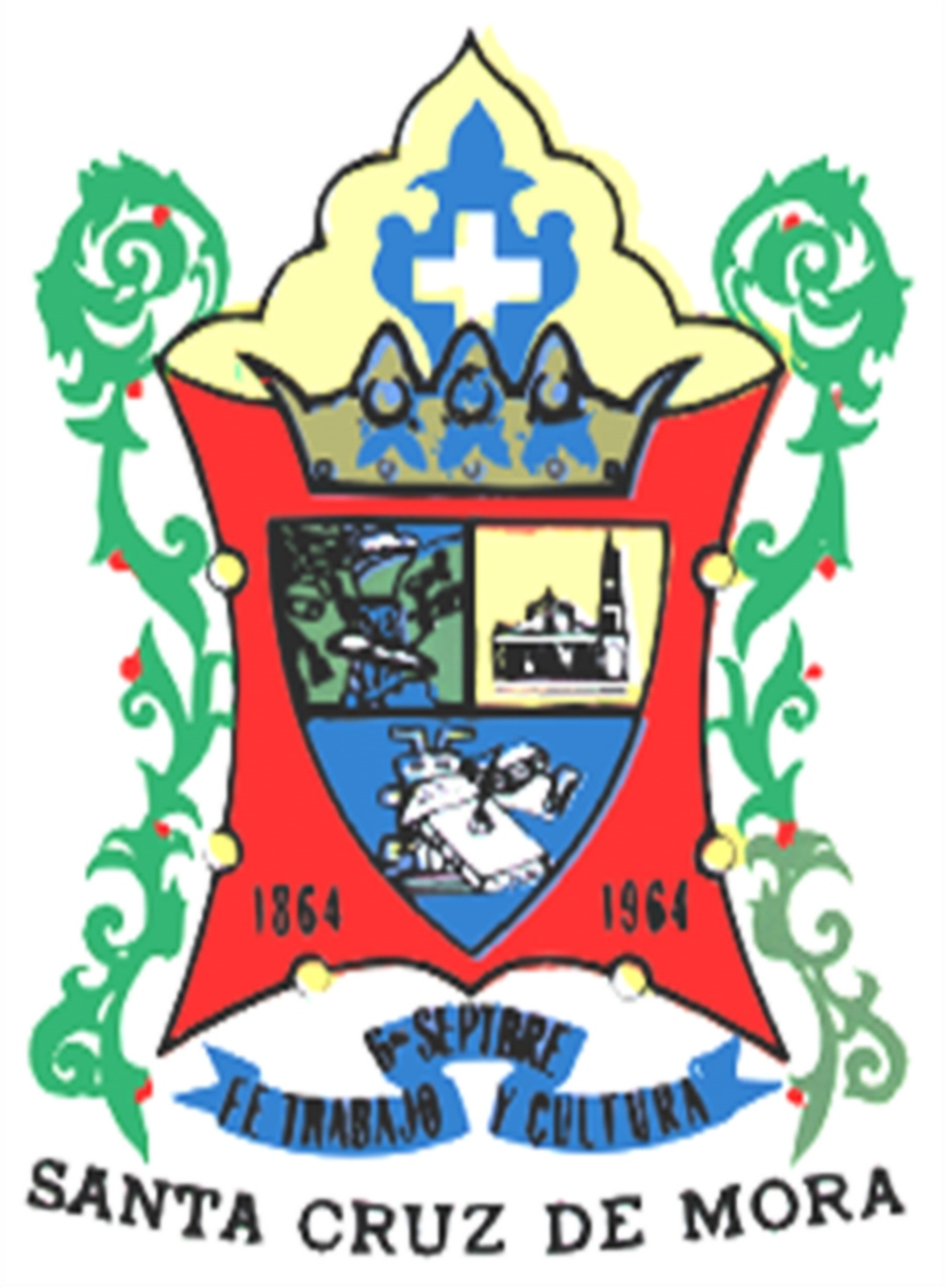
- Flag Coat of arms

- Location in Mérida

- Location in Venezuela
- Coordinates: 8°24′33″N 71°39′05″W
- Country: Venezuela
- State: Mérida
- Municipal seat: Santa Cruz de Mora

Government
  - Mayor: Eduar Rojas (PSUV)

Area
  - Total: 348 km^{2} (134 sq mi)

Population (2007)
  - Total: 26,073
  - Density: 74.9/km^{2} (194/sq mi)
- Time zone: UTC−4 (VET)
- Area code(s): 0275
- Website: Official website

The Antonio Pinto Salinas Municipality is one of the 23 municipalities (municipios) that makes up the Venezuelan state of Mérida and, according to a 2007 population estimate by the National Institute of Statistics of Venezuela, the municipality has a population of 26,073. The town of Santa Cruz de Mora is the shire town of the Antonio Pinto Salinas Municipality.

== Demographics ==
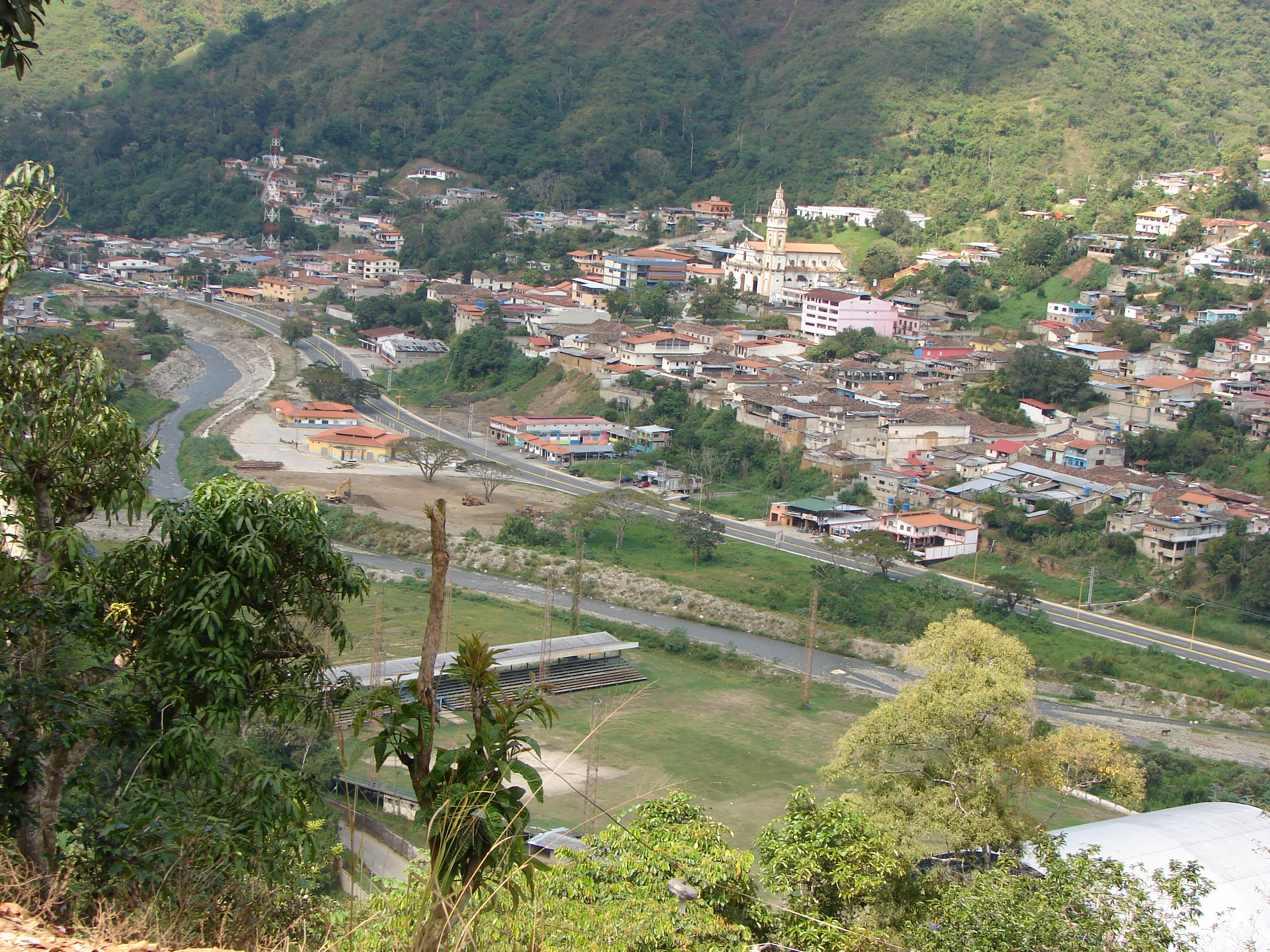
Santa Cruz de Mora.

The Antonio Pinto Salinas Municipality, according to a 2007 population estimate by the National Institute of Statistics of Venezuela, has a population of 26,073 (up from 23,905 in 2000). This amounts to 3.1% of the state's population. The municipality's population density is 74.9 inhabitants per square kilometre (194/sq mi).

== Government ==
The mayor of the Antonio Pinto Salinas Municipality is Jesús Alexis Rodríguez, re-elected on October 31, 2004, with 55% of the vote. The municipality is divided into three parishes; Capital Antonio Pinto Salinas, Mesa Bolívar, and Mesa de Las Palmas.
