= San Simón, Táchira =

Town in Táchira, Venezuela

San Simón
- Coat of arms

- Location within Venezuela
- Coordinates: 8°20′59″N 71°51′16″W
- Country: Venezuela
- State: Táchira
- Municipality: Simón Rodríguez
- Elevation: 1,215 m (3,986 ft)

Population (2011)
  - Total: 2,085
- Time zone: UTC−04:00 (VET)
- Climate: Cfb

San Simón is the shire town of the municipality of Simón Rodríguez of Táchira, in Venezuela.
