= Buchivacoa Municipality =

Buchivacoa Municipality Municipio Buchivacoa
- Municipality
- Flag Coat of arms

- Location in Falcón

- Location in Venezuela
- Coordinates: 11°04′14″N 70°30′42″W
- Country: Venezuela
- State: Falcón
- Municipal seat: Capatárida[*]

Government
  - Mayor: Bellirde Morales Espluga (PSUV)

Area
  - Total: 3,423.1 km^{2} (1,321.7 sq mi)

Population (2007)
  - Total: 25,000
  - Density: 7.3/km^{2} (19/sq mi)
- Time zone: UTC−4 (VET)
- Website: Official website

Buchivacoa Municipality is a municipality in Falcón State, Venezuela.
