= Rafael Urdaneta University =

Venezuelan private, non-profit university

Coordinates: 10.65°N 71.595833°W

- Universidad Rafael Urdaneta
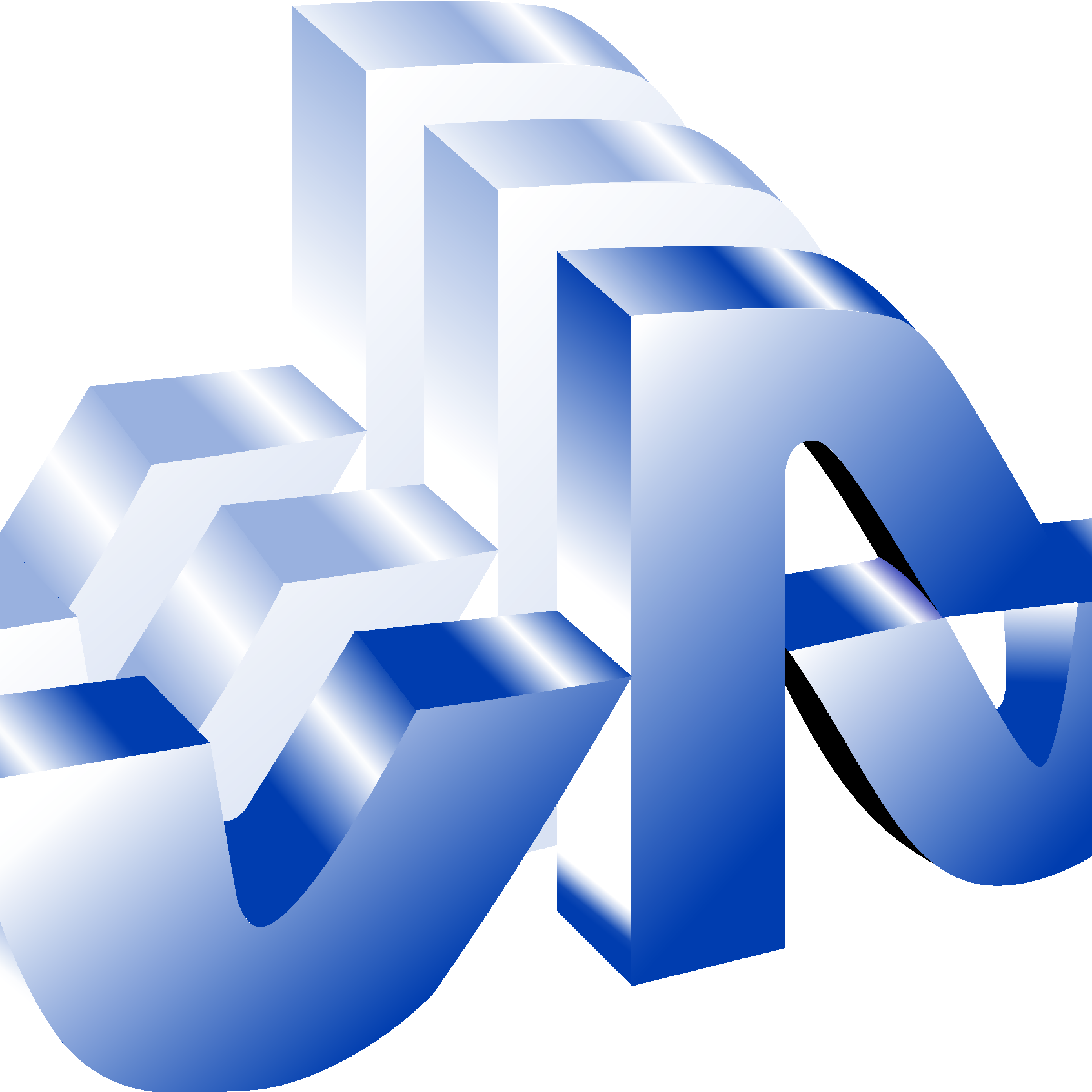
- Type: Private University
- Established: October 24, 1973
- Rector: Jesús Esparza Bracho
- Principal: Maulio Rodríguez
- Students: 12,000 (approx.)
- Location: Maracaibo, Zulia, Venezuela
- Colors: White and Blue
- Website: Universidad Rafael Urdaneta

Rafael Urdaneta University; URU (Spanish: Universidad Rafael Urdaneta) is a private, non-profit university founded in 1973, located at La Vereda del Lago (Maracaibo, Venezuela), by the Rafael Urdaneta foundation and the Rafael Urdaneta university civic association. It receives its name from the general Rafael Urdaneta, Zulian father of Venezuelan independence.

Rafael Urdaneta University is a higher education institute whose purpose is to generate and apply the imparted knowledge to contribute to the evolution of the human being and to the formation of professionals with values, independent, competitive and compromised to the scientific, technical and humanistic development of the social environment to elaborate sustainable projects that resolve the problems of the State and the Nation.

== History ==
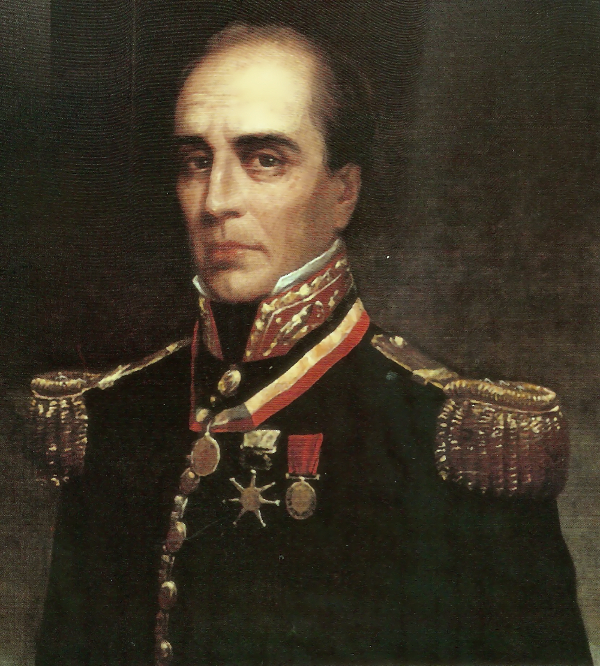
The university was named in honor of Rafael Urdaneta, renowned Zulian hero.

The Rafael Urdaneta University (URU) is a nonprofit institution, officially authorized by the Executive Order #101 of May 21, 1974, issued from the Presidency of the Republic, with a positive opinion of the National Council of Universities. It was created "with the purpose to form the necessary and capable human resource to face the scientific and technological developments" in the strategic areas of the country. It was founded by Eloy Parraga Villamarín, who used to be the Governor of Zulia state and ambassador of the United States of America.

Formed by extensive professional and business sectors of the society on October 24, 1973, it started educational activities on September 4, 1976. The Rafael Urdaneta University is named after the Zulian hero Rafael Urdaneta (1788-1845), a prominent leader of the Ibero-American independence.

Since its foundation, URU investigated and applied an anthropocentric role. Given its commitment to education in a developing country, the university focuses on the Undergraduate education. It is an autonomous institution in the terms defined by the Constitution and the Law of Universities. Within the academic community, it is known for its respectful pluralism founded in logical reasoning; the methodology of the science and the social relevance of the knowledge incite the production of wisdom. The integral conception of the person is assumed in extra-curricular activities.

== Mission ==
Rafael Urdaneta University is a higher education institute whose purpose is to generate and apply the imparted knowledge to contribute to the evolution of the human being and to the formation of professionals with values, independent, competitive and compromised to the scientific, technical and humanistic development of the social environment to elaborate sustainable projects that resolve the problems of the State and the Nation.

In that sense, URU executes the necessary academic programs to form professionals of higher education in relevant areas from the social scientific point of view, through fresh and flexible curriculums which are constantly adapted to the new demands of the diverse disciplines of knowledge and of the professional praxis.

For that purpose, URU has programs of basic, applied, and extensive investigation. From a higher level, through a line of heuristic training which defines the profile of the creative and suitable professional to resolve problems in situations of increasing complexity; URU emphasizes quaternary education through significant supports to the scientific and social context.

== Faculties and schools ==
The faculties and schools of URU are:

=== Faculty of Agricultural Sciences ===
- School of Animal Production Engineering

=== Faculty of Political, Management and Social Sciences ===
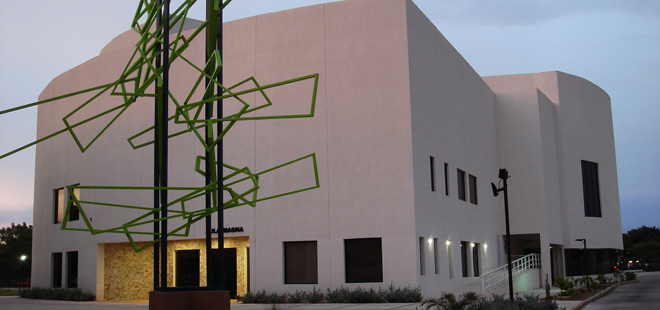
Aula Magna of URU

- School of Business Management
- School of Public Accounting
- School of Political Sciences
- School of Law
- School of Psychology

=== Faculty of Engineering and Architecture ===
- School of Civil Engineering
- School of Electrical Engineering
- School of Telecommunications Engineering
- School of Chemical Engineering
- School of Industrial Engineering
- School of Computer Engineering
- School of Architecture
