= Maneiro Municipality =

Maneiro Municipality Municipio Maneiro
- Municipality
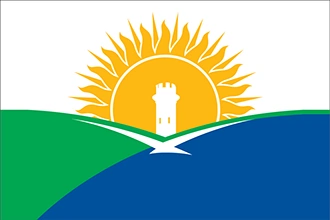
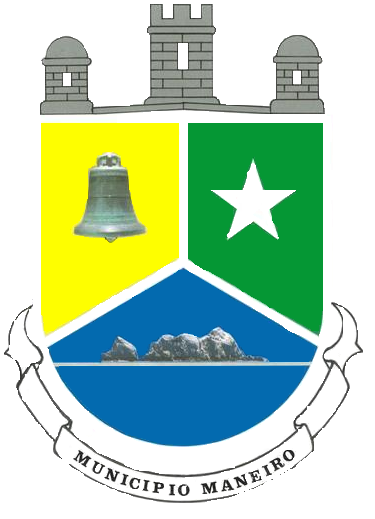
- Flag Coat of arms

- Location in Nueva Esparta

- Location in Venezuela
- Coordinates: 10°59′54″N 63°48′45″W
- Country: Venezuela
- State: Nueva Esparta
- Municipal seat: Pampatar

Area
  - Total: 46.0 km^{2} (17.8 sq mi)
- Time zone: UTC−4 (VET)

Maneiro is one of 11 municipalities that make up Isla Margarita in the state of Nueva Esparta, Venezuela. The capital is Pampatar. In the 2011 census (published 2014) Maneiro had a population of 48,952 people.
