= National Assembly of Venezuela =

Unicameral legislature of Venezuela

Coordinates: 10°30′20″N 66°54′57″W

National Assembly of Venezuela Asamblea Nacional de Venezuela
- VI National Assembly

Type
- Type: Unicameral

History
- Founded: 20 December 1999; 26 years ago
- Preceded by: Congress of Venezuela
- New session started: 5 January 2026

Leadership
- President: Jorge Rodríguez, PSUV since 5 January 2021
- First Vice President: Pedro José Infante, PSUV since 5 January 2023
- Second Vice President: Grecia Colmenares, PSUV since 5 January 2026

Structure
- Seats: 285
- Political groups: Majority (256): GPPSB (253); Indigenous seats (3); Minority (28): UNT–UNICA (11); AD (7); FV (4); PV (2); CMC (1); El Cambio (1); Copei (1); LÁPIZ (1)
- Committees: 15 standing committees
- Length of term: 5 years

Elections
- Voting system: Parallel voting: Party-list proportional representation (149 seats); First-past-the-post (136 seats)
- First election: 30 July 2000
- Last election: 25 May 2025 (partial recognition)
- Next election: 2030

Meeting place
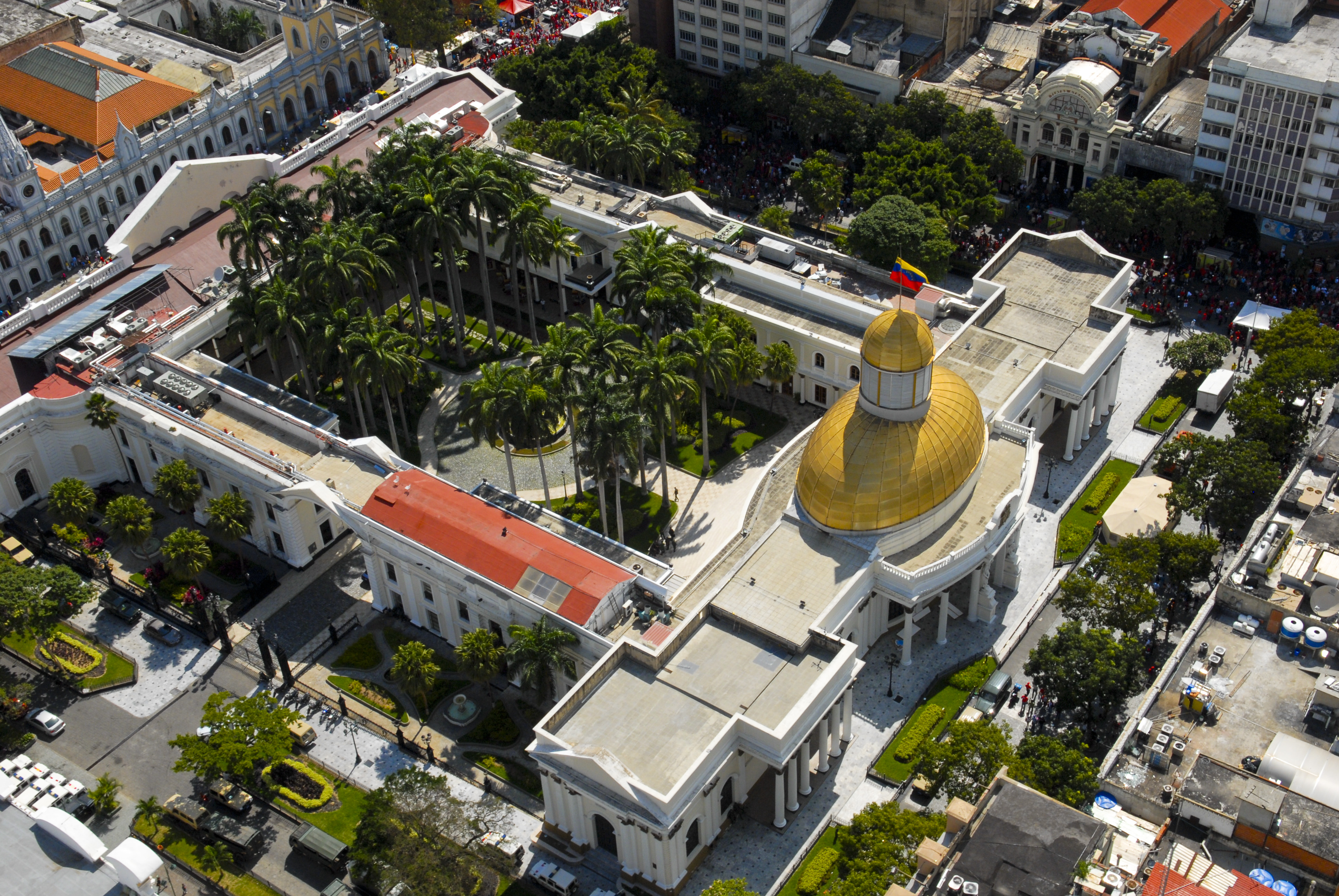
- Federal Legislative Palace; Caracas, Capital District, Venezuela

Website
- www.asambleanacional.gob.ve

Constitution
- Constitution of Venezuela

Rules
- Internal and Debate Regulations of the National Assembly (Spanish)

The National Assembly (Spanish: Asamblea Nacional) is the federal legislature of the Bolivarian Republic of Venezuela, which was first elected in 2000 under the 1999 constitution. It is a unicameral body made up of a variable number of members, who are elected by a "universal, direct, personal, and secret" vote partly by direct election in state-based voting districts, and partly on a state-based party-list proportional representation system.

Each of the 23 states and the Capital District elects no less than three representatives plus the result of dividing the state population by 1.1% of the total population of the country. Three seats are reserved for representatives of Venezuela's indigenous peoples and elected separately by all citizens, not just those with indigenous backgrounds. For the 2010 to 2015 the total number of seats was 165, with 167 from 2015 to 2021.

Deputies to the National Assembly serve a five-year term and may be re-elected for a maximum of two consecutive terms. The National Assembly meets in the Federal Legislative Palace in Venezuela's capital, Caracas.

== Legislative history ==
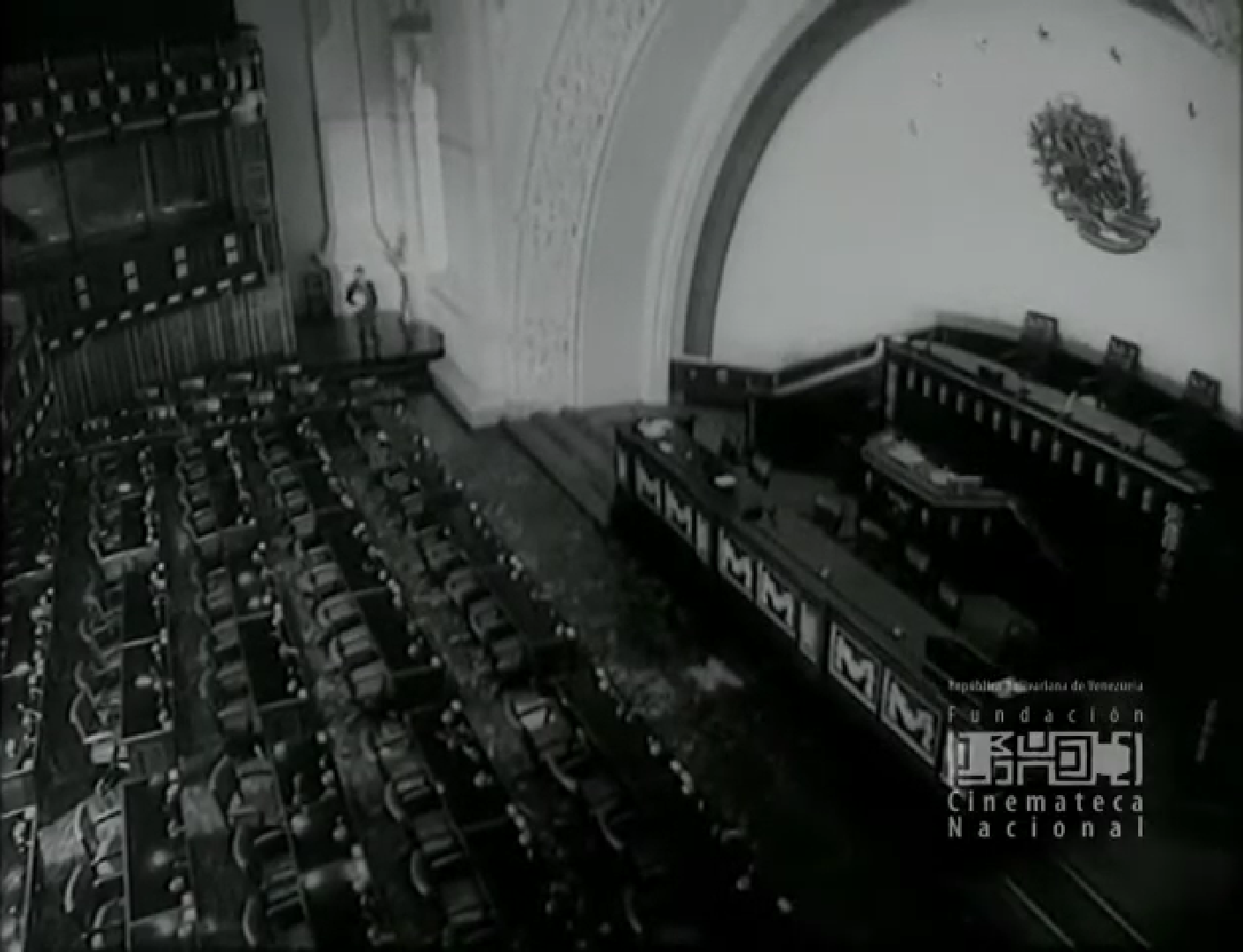
Plenary Chamber of the National Congress of Venezuela as shown in the 1963 film Cuentos para mayores

=== 1961 Constitution ===
Under its previous 1961 Venezuelan Constitution, Venezuela had a bicameral legislature, known as the Congress (Congreso). This Congress was composed of a Senate (Senado) and a Chamber of Deputies (Cámara de Diputados).

The Senate was made up of two senators per state, two for the Federal District, and a number of ex officio senators intended to represent the nation's minorities. In addition, former presidents (those elected democratically or their replacements legally appointed to serve at least half a presidential term) were awarded lifetime senate seats. Senators were required to be Venezuelan-born citizens and over the age of 30.

The members of the Chamber of Deputies were elected by direct universal suffrage, with each state returning at least two. Deputies had to be at least 21 years old.

The Senate and the Chamber of Deputies were each led by a President, and both performed their functions with the help of a Directorial Board. The President of Senate of Venezuela held the additional title of "President of the Congress", and was the constitutional successor of the President of Venezuela in case of a vacancy. This succession took place in 1993, when Octavio Lepage succeeded Carlos Andrés Pérez.

=== 1999 Constitution ===
Hugo Chávez was first elected as President of Venezuela in December 1998 on a platform calling for a constituent assembly to be convened to draft a new constitution for the country. Chávez's argument was that the existing political system, under the earlier 1961 Constitution, had become isolated from the people. In the Constituent Assembly elections held on 25 July 1999, all but six seats were given to candidates associated with the Chávez movement. The Constituent National Assembly (ANC), consisting of 131 elected individuals, convened in August 1999 to begin rewriting the constitution.

The ANC's proposed constitution was later approved in a referendum on 15 December 1999, with voter turnout at 44%, and came into effect on 20 December.

==== 2017 constitutional crisis ====
On 29 March 2017, the Supreme Tribunal of Justice (TSJ), led by Maikel Moreno, ruled that the opposition-controlled National Assembly was in contempt and transferred all legislative powers to the court itself. The TSJ had previously declared the Assembly in contempt in 2016 after it swore in several legislators whose elections had been annulled. The 2017 ruling stated that this "situation of contempt" prevented the Assembly from exercising its constitutional authority. As a result, legislative powers shifted from the Assembly, which had been under opposition control since 5 January 2016, to the pro-government Supreme Court. The opposition condemned the decision, with Assembly President Julio Borges calling it a coup d'état by President Nicolás Maduro. Following widespread protests and international criticism, the ruling was partially reversed on 1 April 2017.

On 4 August 2017, Venezuela convened a new Constituent National Assembly after a special election which was boycotted by the Democratic Unity Roundtable (MUD) and other opposition parties. The new Constituent Assembly was officially intended to rewrite the constitution; it also had wide legal powers allowing it to rule above all other state institutions. The Constituent Assembly met within the Federal Legislative Palace; while the leadership of the National Assembly had said it would continue its work as a legislature and it would still continue to meet in the same building.

On 18 August, the Constituent Assembly summoned members of the National Assembly to a ceremony intended to acknowledge its claimed legal authority, though no such authority formally existed. Opposition lawmakers boycotted the event, after which the Constituent Assembly assumed all legislative powers from the National Assembly. It justified the move by accusing the Assembly of failing to curb what it described as "opposition violence" during the 2017 Venezuelan protests. The legality of this decision has been widely disputed and condemned by several foreign governments and international organizations.

==== 2020 contested leadership election ====
The 2020 Delegated Committee election on 5 January 2020 was marked by controversy, resulting in two competing claims to the presidency: one by deputy Luis Parra and the other by incumbent Juan Guaidó. Parra, a former member of Justice First expelled in December 2019 over corruption allegations he denied, declared himself president inside the legislature with an alleged 87 votes. His claim was endorsed by the Second Maduro Government. The opposition rejected the result, arguing that no quorum was present and no votes had been formally counted. On the same day, security forces blocked several opposition lawmakers, including Guaidó, from entering the parliamentary building, and restricted access to members of the press.

Later that day, a parallel session was held at the offices of El Nacional newspaper in Caracas, where 100 of the 167 deputies voted to re-elect Guaidó as president. During the session, Guaidó announced his resignation from Popular Will in order to dedicate himself fully to his role as head of parliament and Interim president.

On 7 January, Guaidó forced his way into the legislative chamber through police barricades, where he was sworn in as president of the Assembly despite power cuts inside the building. Parra, meanwhile, continued to assert his own claim to the presidency.

== Membership ==
Any Venezuelan citizen by birth or naturalization, with at least fifteen years of residence in Venezuelan territory, who is 21 years of age or older, is eligible to be elected as a deputy to the National Assembly. However, the same person cannot hold the office of President or Vice President of the Republic, Minister, Secretary of the Presidency, or hold senior positions in Autonomous Institutes or State-owned companies, until three months after leaving these positions. Additionally, state governors, secretaries of government, and other officials at the municipal, state, or national level in the jurisdiction where the election takes place are also ineligible unless holding accidental, assistance, teaching, or academic positions.

A deputy of the National Assembly cannot own, manage, or direct companies that contract with state entities, nor can they manage private lucrative interests with such entities. Deputies are obliged to abstain from voting on issues where they have an economic conflict of interest. Moreover, they are not allowed to accept or exercise other public offices without losing their status as deputies, except for teaching, academic, or assistance activities that do not require full-time dedication.

== Structure and powers ==
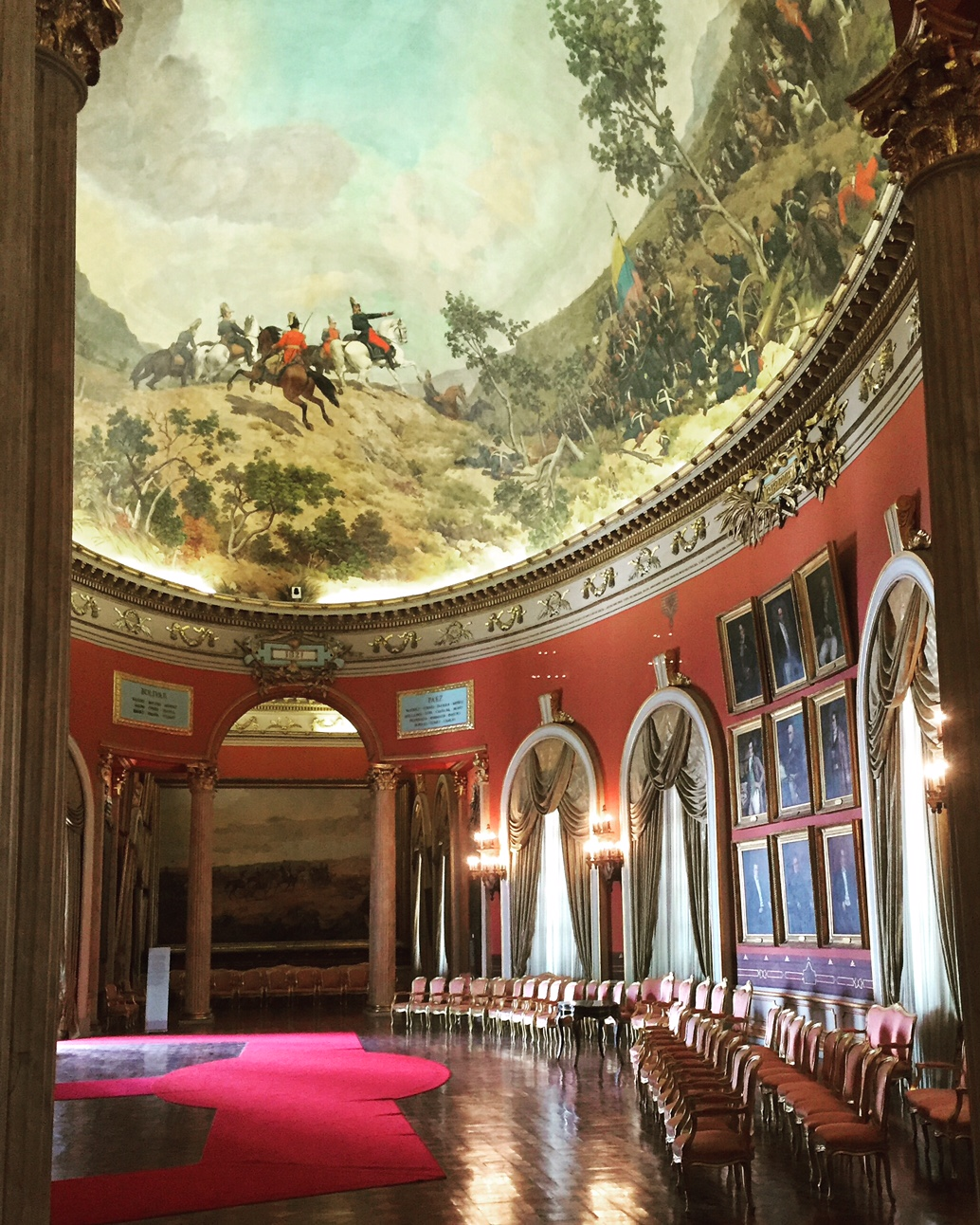
The Elliptical Hall in 2016

Under the current Bolivarian 1999 Constitution, the legislative branch of Government in Venezuela is represented by a unicameral National Assembly. The Assembly is currently made up of 277 seats. Officials are elected by "universal, direct, personal, and secret" vote on a national party-list proportional representation system. In addition, three deputies are returned on a state-by-state basis, and three seats are reserved for representatives of Venezuela's indigenous peoples.

All deputies serve five-year terms and must appoint a replacement (suplente) to stand in for them during periods of incapacity or absence. Under the 1999 constitution deputies could be reelected on up to two terms (Art. 192); under the 2009 Venezuelan constitutional referendum these term limits were removed. Deputies must be Venezuelan citizens by birth, or naturalized Venezuelans with a period of residency in excess of 15 years; older than 21 on the day of the election; and have lived in the state for which they seek election during the previous four years (Art. 188).

Beyond passing legislation (and being able to block any of the president's legislative initiatives), the National Assembly has a number of specific powers outlined in Article 187, including approving the budget, initiating impeachment proceedings against most government officials (including ministers and the Vice President, but not the President, who can only be removed through a recall referendum) and appointing the members of the electoral, judicial, and prosecutor's branches of government. Among others it also has the power to authorize foreign and domestic military action and to authorize the President to leave the national territory for more than 5 days.

The Assembly is led by a President with 2 Vice Presidents, and together with a secretary and an assistant secretary, they form the Assembly Board of Directors (BoD-NAVEN), and when it is on recess twice a year, they lead a Standing Commission of the National Assembly together with 28 other MPs.

Since 2010 the Assembly's 15 Permanent Committees, created by the 2010 Assembly Rules, are composed by MPs (ranging from the minimum of 7 to the maximum of 25) tackling legislation of various issues. The Committees' offices are housed in the José María Vargas Building in Caracas, few hundred yards from the Federal Legislative Palace, the former building is also where the offices of the Assembly leadership are located.

Under Article 241 of the Constitution, if the Executive Vice President is removed from office three times within a single constitutional term through the approval of motions of censure, the President is authorized to dissolve the National Assembly. A decree of dissolution requires that elections for a new legislature be held within sixty days. The Assembly may not be dissolved during the final year of its constitutional term.

== Electoral system ==
In the 2000 Venezuelan parliamentary election, representatives were elected under a mixed member proportional representation, with 60% elected in single seat districts and the remainder by closed party list proportional representation. This was an adaptation of the system previously used for the Venezuelan Chamber of Deputies, which had been introduced in 1993, with a 50-50 balance between single seat districts and party lists, and deputies per state proportional to population, but with a minimum of three deputies per state.

== Political composition ==
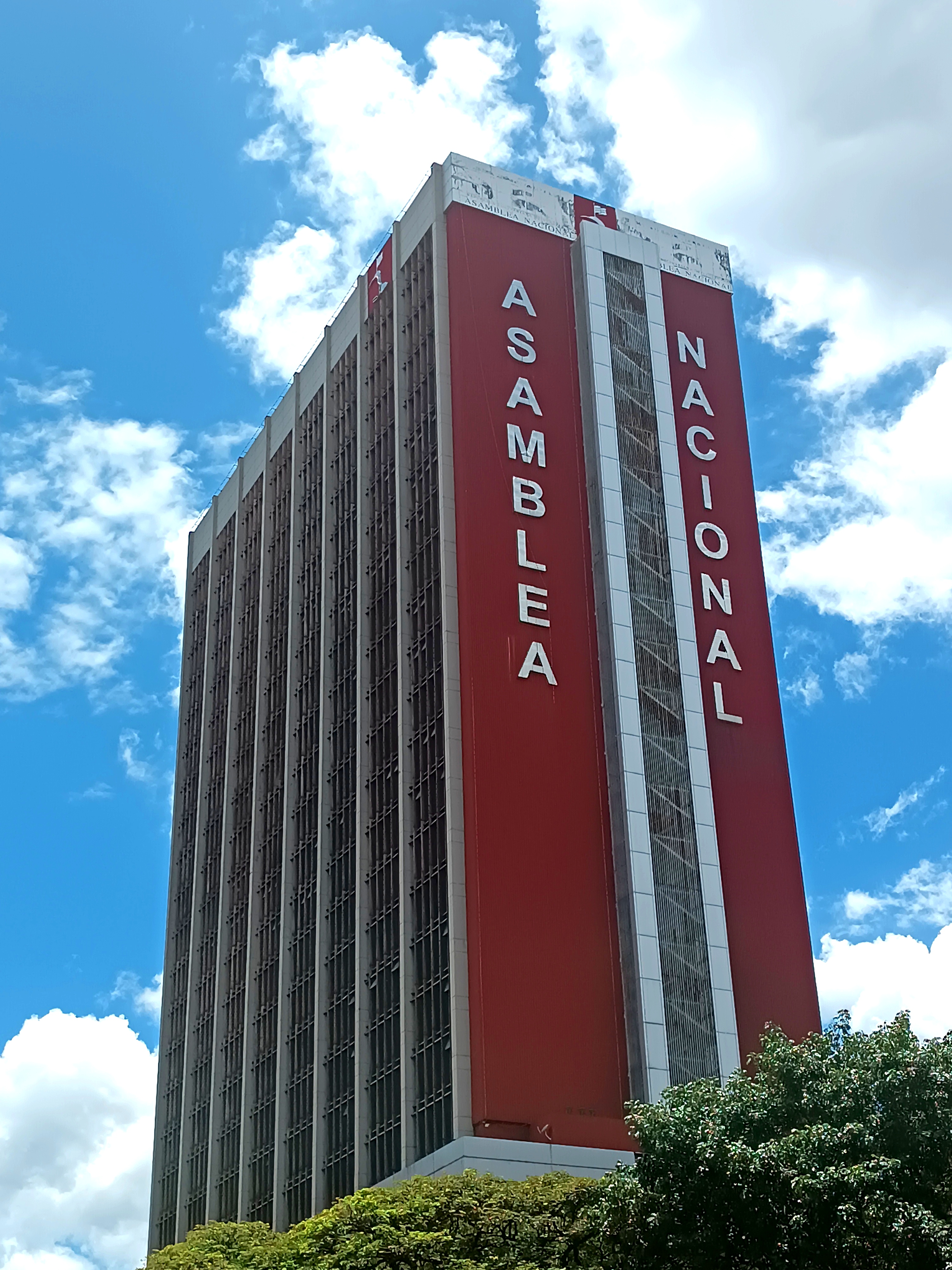
The José María Vargas Building, administrative seat of the National Assembly, in March 2025

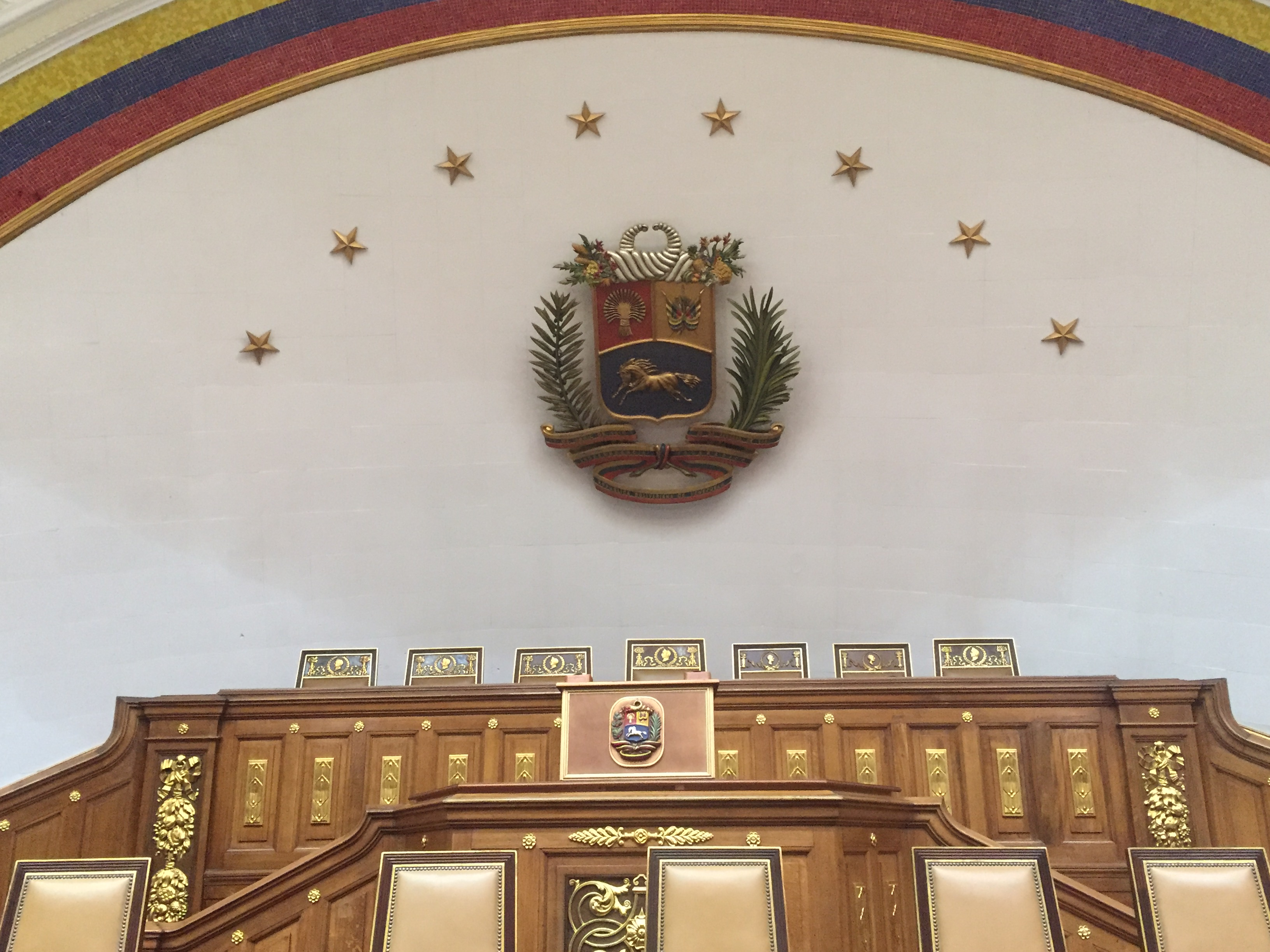
Hemicycle of the Federal Legislative Palace in 2016

The first election of deputies to the new unicameral National Assembly was held on 30 July 2000. President Hugo Chávez's Fifth Republic Movement secured 92 seats (56%). In 2005, the opposition boycotted the election, leaving the Fifth Republic Movement to win 114 seats (69%), though turnout was only about 25%. Two years later, in 2007, several parties—including the Fifth Republic Movement—merged to form the United Socialist Party of Venezuela (PSUV). By January 2009, the PSUV controlled 139 of the 169 seats (82%). In the 2010 election, following a reduction of seats to 165, the PSUV won 96 (58%), the opposition coalition Democratic Unity Roundtable (MUD) won 65, and Patria Para Todos secured 2, with a 66% turnout.

In the 2015 parliamentary election, the MUD achieved a landslide victory, winning 109 of the 164 general seats plus all three indigenous seats. With turnout reaching 74%, the result gave the opposition a two-thirds supermajority in the Assembly. The ruling coalition, the Great Patriotic Pole (GPP), won the remaining 55 seats. However, in January 2016, the Supreme Tribunal of Justice suspended four legislators from Amazonas state, three from the opposition and one from the GPP, over allegations of voter fraud. The decision stripped the opposition of its supermajority and its ability to amend the constitution.

Following the controversial 2017 Constituent Assembly election, a new body was inaugurated with powers that superseded all state institutions and could rewrite the constitution. The opposition-controlled National Assembly refused to recognize it. Initially, the Constituent Assembly's mandate was set for at least two years (per an August 2017 resolution), but by May 2019 it was expected to remain in force until 31 December 2020, coinciding with the next scheduled parliamentary elections.

In the 2020 parliamentary election, Nicolás Maduro's PSUV and allied parties claimed 92% of the Assembly's seats, with an official turnout of 30.5%. The results were disputed by the European Union and the United States, but Maduro nonetheless consolidated control of the legislature, sidelining opposition leader Juan Guaidó. Amid the 2024 political crisis and mounting international isolation of the government, the 2025 parliamentary election was held with record-low turnout and official boycott from the Unitary Platform.

=== Members ===
- I National Assembly of Venezuela
- II National Assembly of Venezuela
- III National Assembly of Venezuela
- IV National Assembly of Venezuela
- V National Assembly of Venezuela
- VI National Assembly of Venezuela

=== Board of Directors ===
Office	Deputy	Party
President of the National Assembly	Jorge Jesús Rodríguez Gómez	PSUV
First Vice President of the National Assembly	Pedro José Infante Aparicio	PSUV
Second Vice President of the National Assembly	América Valentina Pérez Dávila	PSUV

=== Standing committees ===
Committee	Chairperson	Party
Standing Committee on Eco-socialism	Nosliw Andreína Rodríguez Franco	PSUV
Standing Committee on Indigenous Peoples	Nicia Marina Maldonado Maldonado	PSUV
Standing Committee on the People's Power and Communication	Tania Valentina Díaz González	PSUV
Standing Committee on Education, Health, Science, Technology and Innovation	José Óscar Villarroel García	PSUV
Standing Committee on Culture and Recreation	Cristobal Leobardo Jiménez	PSUV
Standing Committee on Families, Freedom of Religion and Worship	Asia Yajaira Villegas Poljak	PSUV
Standing Committee on Administration and Services	Pedro Miguel Carreño Escobar	PSUV
Standing Committee on Foreign Policy, Sovereignty and Integration	Timoteo De Jesus Zambrano Guedez	CMC
Standing Committee on Internal Policy	María Gabriela Vega Sosa	PSUV
Standing Committee on Comptrollership	Winston Teofilactes Vallenilla Hazell	PSUV
Standing Committee on Economy, Finance and National Development	Jesús Germán Faría Tortosa	PSUV
Standing Committee on Energy and Petroleum	Orlando José Camacho Figueira	MSV
Standing Committee on the Security and Defense of the Nation	Gloria Mercedes Castillo De Durán	PSUV
Standing Committee on Comprehensive Social Development	Rodolfo Antonio Crespo Grismaldo	PSUV
Standing Committee on the Development of Communes	Blanca Rosa Eekhout Gómez	PSUV

== Latest election ==
Party	Votes	%	Seats	+/–
Great Patriotic Pole	5,024,475	83.54	253	0
Democratic Alliance	361,769	6.02	13	–7
UNT–UNICA	304,425	5.06	11	New
Neighborhood Force	141,588	2.35	4	+4
Pencil Alliance	181,926	3.02	1	New
Other parties	181,926	3.02	0	–
Indigenous seats			3	0
Total	6,014,183	100.00	285	+8
Valid votes	6,014,183	99.85		
Invalid/blank votes	8,813	0.15		
Total votes	6,022,996	100.00		
Source: Ultimas Notcias

=== Allocation of Seats per State (2026–2031) ===
Federal Entity		Number of Deputies			Map
Federal Entity		Party-list seats	Constituencies	Total	Map
	Amazonas	3	3	6	
	Anzoátegui	4	7	11	
	Apure	3	3	6	
	Aragua	5	7	12	
	Barinas	3	4	7	
	Bolívar	4	6	10	
	Carabobo	6	10	16	
	Cojedes	3	3	6	
	Delta Amacuro	3	3	6	
	Dependencias Federales	—	—	—	
	Distrito Capital	5	8	13	
	Falcón	3	4	7	
	Guárico	3	4	7	
	Guyana Esequibo (disputed)	3	3	6	
	La Guaira	3	3	6	
	Lara	5	8	13	
	Mérida	3	4	7	
	Miranda	8	11	19	
	Monagas	3	4	7	
	Nueva Esparta	3	3	6	
	Portuguesa	3	4	7	
	Sucre	3	4	7	
	Táchira	4	5	9	
	Trujillo	3	4	7	
	Yaracuy	3	3	6	
	Zulia	10	15	25	
Bandera de Venezuela.	Indigenous Representation; Western, Eastern and Southern Regions	—	3	3	
Bandera de Venezuela.	National List	50	—	50	
Bandera de Venezuela.	Venezuela	149	136	285	

== Historical composition of the National Assembly ==
Chavismo / Others / Opposition
2000	98 / 67
2005	164 / 3
2010	98 / 2 / 65
2015	55 / 112
2020	256 / 21
2025	256 / 29

== See also ==
- List of legislatures by country
- Politics of Venezuela
- Venezuelan Chamber of Deputies: lower house of Venezuela (1961–99)
- Senate of Venezuela: upper house of Venezuela (1961–99)
