= Smartmatic =

British election technology company

- Type: Private
- Industry: Technology, Electronic voting
- Founded: 11 April 2000; 26 years ago
- Headquarters: London, United Kingdom, multinational
- Key people: Antonio Mugica, CEO; Peter V. Neffenger, Chairman
- Revenue: $250 million (2014)
- Number of employees: 600
- Website: www.smartmatic.com

Smartmatic (also referred as Smartmatic Corp. or Smartmatic International), or Smartmatic SGO Group, is a British company that builds and implements electronic voting systems. The company also produces smart cities solutions (including public safety and public transport), identity management systems for civil registration and authentication products for government applications.

Smartmatic was founded in 2000 by Antonio Mugica, Alfredo José Anzola, and Roger Piñate and gained attention quickly after it was chosen to replace voting machines in Venezuela ahead of Hugo Chávez's 2004 reelection. The company grew by acquiring the much larger Sequoia Voting Systems in 2006 (though its stake in Sequoia was later divested), and today runs voting systems in many countries across the world.

Smartmatic has faced controversy for some of its actions in the Philippines. During and after the 2020 United States presidential election and subsequent attempts to overturn the results, Smartmatic was the subject of numerous accusations of fraud and conspiracy theories by Donald Trump and his supporters. Smartmatic launched defamation lawsuits against some of its accusers, most notably Fox News, Mike Lindell, Newsmax, One America News Network (OANN), Sidney Powell, and Rudy Giuliani. Three current and former executives from Smartmatic have been charged in the US under the Foreign Corrupt Practices Act for a scheme that includes bribery.

== History ==
=== Founding ===
In 1997, three engineers, Antonio Mugica, Alfredo José Anzola and Roger Piñate, began collaborating in a group while working at Panagroup Corp. in Caracas, Venezuela. Smartmatic was officially incorporated on 11 April 2000 in Delaware by Alfredo José Anzola. Smartmatic then established its headquarters in Boca Raton, Florida, with seven employees. Following the 2000 United States presidential election and its hanging chad controversy in Florida, the group proposed to dedicate a system toward electoral functions. After receiving funds from private investors, the company then began to expand.

=== Expansion ===
Smartmatic was a little-known firm with no experience in voting technology before it was chosen by the Venezuelan authorities to replace the country's elections machinery ahead of a contentious referendum that confirmed Hugo Chávez as president in August 2004. Before the election, Smartmatic was part of a consortium that included a software company partly owned by a Venezuelan government agency. In March 2005, with a windfall of some $120 million from its first three contracts with Venezuela, Smartmatic then bought the much larger and more established Sequoia Voting Systems, which by 2006 had voting equipment installed in 17 states and the District of Columbia. On 26 August 2005, Sequoia Voting Systems announced that Mr. Jack Blaine would serve in the dual role as President of Sequoia Voting Systems and President of Sequoia's parent company, Smartmatic.

=== Sale of Sequoia Voting Systems ===
On 8 November 2007, Smartmatic announced that it was divesting ownership of the voting machine company Sequoia Voting Systems. However, in April 2008, Smartmatic still held a $2 million note from SVS Holdings, Inc., the management team which purchased Sequoia Voting Systems from Smartmatic, and at that time Sequoia's machines still used Smartmatic's intellectual property.

=== SGO Corporation ===
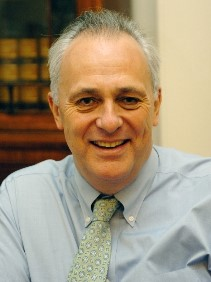
Lord Malloch Brown

In 2014, Smartmatic's CEO Antonio Mugica and British Lord Mark Malloch-Brown announced the launching of the SGO Corporation Limited, a holding company based in London whose primary asset is the election technology and voting machine manufacturer. Lord Malloch-Brown became chairman of the board of directors of SGO since its foundation, while Antonio Mugica remained as CEO of the new venture. They were joined on SGO's board by Sir Nigel Knowles, Global CEO of DLA Piper, entrepreneur David Giampaolo and Roger Piñate, Smartmatic's COO and co-founder. Malloch-Brown stepped down as chair in December 2020.

The aim of SGO, according to its CEO was "to continue to make investments in its core business (election technology), but it is also set to roll out a series of new ventures based on biometrics, online identity verification, internet voting and citizen participation, e-governance and pollution control."

== Elections ==
The company was contracted in 2004 for the automation of electoral processes in Venezuela. Since 2004, its election technology has been used in local and national elections in Africa, Argentina, Belgium, Brazil, Bulgaria, Chile, Ecuador, Italy Mexico, the Philippines, Singapore, the United Kingdom, the United States and Venezuela.

=== Africa ===
Smartmatic has operated in Uganda, Zambia and is still deploying an identity management project in Sierra Leone. In 2010, Smartmatic has worked with the United Nations Development Programme and Zambian authorities to modernise the voter registry using biometric technology. In 2016, they maintained the voter registry ahead of the elections. Smartmatic also assisted the Electoral Commission of Uganda to modernise its election processes to increase the transparency of the 2016 general elections. The polling company supplied over 30,000 biometric machines across 28,010 polling stations, from the capital of Kampala to remote rural communities to verify the identity of over 15 million people.

=== Armenia ===
During the 2017 Armenian parliamentary election, a voter authentication system was used for the first time. The identity of the voter was validated prior to voting using Voter Authentication Devices (VADs), which contained an electronic copy of the voter lists. The introduction of new technologies in the electoral process was strongly supported by the opposition and civil society. Smartmatic provided 4,000 Voter Authentication Devices to the UNDP project "Support to the Electoral Process in Armenia" (SEPA). It was funded by the EU, United States, Germany, United Kingdom, and the Government of Armenia.

According to final reports from The International Elections Observation Missions (IEOM) "The VADs functioned effectively and without significant issues." Observers reported the introduction of the VADs was welcomed by most IEOM interlocutors as a useful tool for building confidence in the integrity of Election Day proceedings. Observers also mentioned in the final report that the late introduction of the VADs could have led to a limited time for testing of equipment and training of operators, stating "Observers noted some problems with scanning of ID documents and fingerprints; however, this did not lead to significant disruptions of voting. IEOM observers noted 9 cases of voters attempting multiple voting that were captured by the VADs. The VADs provided the possibility for voters to be redirected, in case they were registered in another polling station in the same TEC, and this was observed in 55 polling stations."

=== Belgium ===
Electronic voting in Belgium has been utilized since the 1991 Belgian general election. Belgium is one of the few European countries that use electronic voting. In 2012, Belgium approved a ten-year contract with Smartmatic to be the election technology supplier after an evaluation period of three years. In an evaluation by constitutional law researcher Carlos Vegas González, he stated that the printout ballot increased transparency and noted that Smartmatic's system was independently certified by PricewaterhouseCoopers.

=== Brazil ===
Smartmatic provided election technology services to Brazil's Superior Electoral Court (TSE) for the 2012 Brazilian municipal elections, 2014 Brazilian general election and 2016 Brazilian municipal elections cycles.

In October 2012, Smartmatic provided election support for data and voice communications to 16 states in Brazil, and the Federal District (FD) (deploying 1,300 Broadband Global Area Network (BGAN) satellite devices), as well as support services to voting machines. These services implied hiring and training 14,000 technicians who worked at 480,000 polling stations. In 2014, the Brazilian electoral commission relied on an increased number of BGAN terminals, deployed by Smartmatic, to enable results transmission. BGAN satellite broadband voice and data service was used to connect voting stations to the nation's electronic voting system.

=== Estonia ===
In 2014, Smartmatic and Cybernetica, the Estonian IT lab that built the original Internet voting system used in the country, co-founded the Centre of Excellence for Internet voting. The centre is working with the government of Estonia to advance Internet voting on a global scale.

Estonia is the only country to run Internet voting on a wide scale, where citizens can access services through their eID card. The e-voting system, the largest run by any European Union country, was first introduced in 2005 for local elections, and was subsequently used in the 2007, 2011 and 2015 parliamentary elections, with the proportion of voters using this voting method rising from 5.5 per cent to 24.3 per cent to 30.5 per cent respectively.

Some experts have warned that Estonia's online voting system might be vulnerable to hacking. In 2014, J. Alex Halderman, an associate professor at the University of Michigan, and his group, described as being "harshly critical of electronic voting systems around the world", reviewed Estonia's voting system. Halderman described the Estonian "i-voting" system as "pretty primitive by modern standards ... I got to observe the processes that they went through, and there were just—it was just quite sloppy throughout the whole time". A security analysis of the system by the University of Michigan and the Open Rights Group that was led by Halderman found that "the I-voting system has serious architectural limitations and procedural gaps that potentially jeopardize the integrity of elections". The analysis concluded:

As we have observed, the procedures Estonia has in place to guard against attack and ensure transparency offer insufficient protection. Based on our tests, we conclude that a state-level attacker, sophisticated criminal, or dishonest insider could defeat both the technological and procedural controls in order to manipulate election outcomes. ... Due to these risks, we recommend that Estonia discontinue use of the I-voting system.

The Estonian National Electoral Committee responded to the report, stating that the claims "were unsubstantiated and the described attacks infeasible." Before each election, the system is rebuilt from the ground up, and security testing including penetration testing and denial-of-service mitigation tests are carried out. In their statement, the Estonian National Electoral Committee says: "every aspect of online balloting procedures is fully documented, these procedures are rigorously audited, and video documenting all conducted procedures is posted online. In addition to opening every aspect of our balloting to observers, we have posted the source code of our voting software online. In the past decade, our online balloting has stood up to numerous reviews and security tests. We believe that online balloting allows us to achieve a level of security greater than what is possible with paper ballots".

Following the criticism, the number of Estonian e-voters at the 2015 Parliamentary Election was a record-breaking 176,491 (30.5% of votes cast).

=== Philippines ===
==== 2008 Philippine regional elections ====
On 11 August 2008, automated elections was implemented in the Philippines through the 2008 Autonomous Region in Muslim Mindanao general election with it overseen by the Carter Center. In the Maguindanao province, voters used Smartmatic's electronic voting machines, while voters in the other 5 provinces (Shariff Kabunsuan, Lanao del Sur, Basilan, Sulu, and Tawi-Tawi) used manually marked ballots processed using OMR technology. The overall reaction of both the public and authorities was positive toward the process. Random audits performed by the Commission on Elections (Comelec) resulted in an accuracy rate over 99.5% in all elections from 2008 where Smartmatic equipment was utilized.

The implementation of the system was also controversial as several groups which were benefiting from the traditionally fraudulent conduct of Philippines polls found themselves facing great political and economic loss with the promised transparency and audit-ability of the automated elections system. The Manila Times stating that "only the truly uninformed would still find Smartmatic's combination of PCOS/VCM and CCS an acceptable solution to the automation of Philippine elections" and that "glitches" as well as the "lack of transparency ... convinced us of the system's unreliability and its vulnerability to tampering". Others supported Smartmatic's entry into the nation, with one group, the Concerned Citizens Movement, praising the company's performance after initially requesting Comelec to not use Smartmatic's systems.

==== 2010 Philippine general election ====
On May 10, 2010, Monday, Smartmatic adapted the system to the national level following its usage at ARMM two years earlier and preparations for the former from 2009 to 2010. It covered live with full coverage from ABS-CBN, ANC and GMA Network. Senator Benigno Aquino III succeeded Gloria Macapagal Arroyo as President, while Makati City mayor Jejomar Binay succeeded Noli de Castro as Vice President of the Philippines by June 30, 2010. Elected legislators of this year, together with the incumbent congresspersons from the 2007 elections, constitute the 15th Congress of the Philippines.

A survey conducted by the Social Weather Stations (SWS) showed that 75% of Filipinos questioned were satisfied with the conduct of the automated elections. The survey also showed that 70% of respondents were satisfied with Smartmatic.

==== 2013 Philippine midterm elections ====
On 13 May 2013, halfway between its last Presidential elections in 2010 and its next in 2016, the Philippines held its midterm elections where 18,000 positions were at stake. Smartmatic again provided technology and services to Comelec. The same 82,000 voting machines used in 2010 were deployed.

Election watchdog National Citizens Movement for Free Elections (Namfrel), which is one of the Comelec's official citizen's arm for the midterm elections, assessed the polls as "generally peaceful and organized." The Philippine National Police considered the 2013 the most peaceful elections in the history of the country. The US Embassy commended the Filipinos for the elections.

==== 2016 Philippine presidential election ====
For the country's third national automated elections and fourth overall in the 2016 Philippine presidential election, which was held on 9 May 2016, a total of 92,509 vote-counting machines (VCMs) were deployed across an archipelago comprising 7,107 islands, while 5,500 VCMs served as back-up voting machines. For Overseas Absentee Voting Act (OAV), 130 VCMs were deployed in 18 countries.

There were major challenges faced prior to elections, chief of which was the late-stage Supreme Court ruling that required each voting machine to print a receipt. The ruling was handed down on 17 March 2016, giving Comelec and Smartmatic less than two months to prepare. By election night, about 86% of election data had already been transmitted, prompting winners in local municipalities to be proclaimed in real-time. Also by election night, Filipinos already knew who the winning president was, leading other candidates to concede within 24 hours. This concession of several candidates signified acceptance of results that validated the credibility of the automation system. Over 20,000 candidates conceded.

Rodrigo Duterte became the 16th President of the Philippines, succeeding Benigno Aquino III, while the 14th Vice President Leni Robredo succeeded Jejomar Binay by June 30, 2016. Legislators elected in the 2016 elections joined the senators elected in the 2013 midterm elections to constitute the 16th Congress of the Philippines.

==== 2019 Philippine Senate election ====
During the 2019 Philippine Senate election, Smartmatic was minimally involved in the election and was only available for technical assistance. The majority of electoral functions were performed by Comelec after it purchased Smartmatic's voting machines following the 2016 elections.

=== Singapore ===
From the 2020 general election onwards, Smartmatic was used for the electronic registration of voters at polling stations on polling day, replacing the need for election officials to manually strike out each voter's particulars from a hardcopy register of electors when a voter has voted.

=== United States ===
==== 2016 Utah Republican presidential primaries ====
In the 2016 Utah Republican caucus, where Utah Republicans voted to choose the party's nominee for president in the 2016 US Presidential election, the voters had the opportunity to vote using traditional methods or to vote online. For online voting, the Utah Republican Party used an internet voting system developed by the Smartmatic-Cybernetica Internet Voting Centre of Excellence, based in Estonia.

Despite warnings from security experts, Utah GOP officials billed the online voting system, for which the state paid $150,000. Multiple issues occurred with the system, with voters receiving error messages and even being blocked from voting. Smartmatic received thousands of calls from Utah voters surrounding issues with the process. The Washington Post states that "the concern seems to be less with the technology and more with the security of the devices people use to vote".

According to Joe Kiniry, the lead researcher of Galois, a technology research firm:

Several of us did a lightweight analysis of it remotely, to see how it was built and deployed and this sort of thing ... we found that they were using technologies that even modern Web programmers stay away from. ... It's like the dumbest possible choices are being made by some of these companies with respect to deployed technology that should be mission-critical!

Responses from voters, who participated in the caucus from more than 45 countries, was positive: 94% approved of the experience, 97% responded that they were interested in participating in future online elections and 82% thought online voting should be used nationally.

==== Los Angeles county ====
In 2017, Los Angeles County signed a $282 million contract with Smartmatic to create an election system to be used for future elections, and became the first publicly owned voting system in the United States. The system was first used during the 2020 California primary elections. Both software and hardware were developed in the United States by Smartmatic, while ownership of all products and intellectual properties were then given to Los Angeles County. The machines developed incorporate an interactive ballot that is printed by each voter to validate results, and then deposited back into voting machines. According to The Voting System Assessment Project, interest in the voting system was expressed by other districts in the United States and internationally.

=== Venezuela ===
Smartmatic was the main technology supplier for fourteen Venezuelan national elections. In March 2018, Smartmatic ceased operations in Venezuela.

==== 2004 Venezuela recall referendum ====
Venezuela's previously existing laws that were established before Hugo Chávez's Bolivarian Revolution stated that automated voting was required in Venezuela, with United States firm Election Systems & Software and Spanish company Indra Sistemas already being used in the country. In response to a bid process for the 2004 Venezuela recall election initiated by the National Electoral Council (CNE), Venezuela's electoral authority, the SBC Consortium was formed in the third quarter of 2003. The SBC Consortium comprised Smartmatic, Bizta, and telecommunications organization CANTV. For the 2004 elections, the SBC Consortium competed with Indra and other companies, ultimately winning the contract worth $128 million. The voting machines used previously, furnished by Indra Sistemas, were mere ballot scanners having only basic functions for storing cast votes until the end of Election Day, with no feedback whatsoever for the voter. Smartmatic had re-engineered Olivetti lottery machines used in Italy, essentially state-of-the-art PCs, each providing a colour touchscreen, a thermal printer, and advanced programming handling the voting process and printing of VVPAT receipts for the voter to check, and also tally reports and data transmission at voting session closure, with special emphasis on security. Other than the touchscreen (operating under program control), there was no input device or communications in force during Voting Day. Smartmatic's role in the election was to oversee electoral workers' training and the preparation, testing and deployment of voting machines. Bizta sent manual votes in remote areas to software centers and CANTV provided logistical assistance.

==== 2012 Venezuelan presidential election ====
In October 2012, Smartmatic participated in the elections of 3 countries. In Venezuela, 7 October, for the first time in the world, national elections were carried out with biometric voter authentication to activate the voting machines. Out of 18,903,143 citizens registered to vote in the presidential elections, voter turnout was around 81%, both record figures in Venezuelan electoral history.

==== 2017 Venezuelan Constituent Assembly election ====
Smartmatic stated that the results of the 2017 Venezuelan Constituent Assembly election were manipulated. On 2 August 2017, Smartmatic CEO Antonio Mugica stated on a press briefing in London "We know, without a doubt, that the result of the recent elections for a National Constituent Assembly were manipulated," and added "We estimate that the difference between actual and announced participation by the authorities is at least one million votes." Reuters also reported that according to internal CNE documents leaked to the agency, only 3,720,465 votes were cast thirty minutes before polls were expected to close, though polls were open for an additional hour. The company later left Venezuela in 2018.

== Other endeavors ==
=== Automation ===
In 2011, The District of Cartagena, Colombia selected Smartmatic as technology provider for the new Financial Administration Service of the Integrated Mass Transit System (Transcaribe), which operates based on a highly automated fare collection and fleet control system.

=== Identification ===
Smartmatic was chosen to develop Mexico's new ID card in 2009, with the process involving the biometric registration of over 100 million people. Bolivia also used Smartmatic's biometric capabilities with the registration of 5.2 million people for electoral systems.

=== Security ===
Smartmatic launched its banking security endeavor in 2002 utilizing its Smartnet system, which it described as "one of the earliest platforms to enable the 'Internet of Things'". The company began providing security technology and surveillance equipment for Santander-Serfin Bank in Mexico at their bank branches in 2004. Since 2006, the Office of the Mayor of Metropolitan Caracas in Venezuela began the installation of the integrated public security system that helps authorities to provide immediate response to citizens whose safety has been jeopardized.

== Controversy ==
=== Venezuela ===
==== 2004 elections ====
After the presidential recall referendum of 2004 in Venezuela, some controversy was raised about the use of electronic voting (SAES voting machines) in that country. Studies following the 2004 Venezuela recall elections found that Smartmatic's network was "bi-directional" with data being able to be transferred both ways between Smartmatic devices and the telecommunications company CANTV, with alleged irregularities found between the Smartmatic and Venezuela's National Electoral Council election results. Other independent election monitors claimed fraud and submitted appeals, and statistical evaluations including a peer-reviewed article in 2006 and a special section of 6-peer-reviewed article in 2011 concluded that it was likely that electronic election fraud had been committed. The analysis of communication patterns allowed for the hypothesis that the data in the machines could have been changed remotely, while another of the articles suggested that the outcome could have been altered from about 60% against the sitting president, to 58% for the sitting president.

Representatives from international election observation agencies attested that the election conducted using SAES was at that time fair, accurate and compliant with the accepted timing and reliability criteria. These agencies included the Carter Center, the Organization of American States (OAS), and the European Union (EU). Jennifer McCoy, Carter Center Director for the Americas, stated that several audits validated the accuracy of the machines. "We found a variation of only 0.1% between the paper receipts and the electronic results. This could be explained by voters putting the slips in the wrong ballot box."

Dr. Tulio Alvarez, who had performed an independent observation of the election which detailed the networks between CNE and Smartmatic, described the Carter Center's findings as "insufficient, superficial and irresponsible".

==== 2005 elections ====
Prior to the 2005 Venezuela parliamentary election, one technician could work around "the machine's allegedly random storage protocols" and remove voting secrecy. Following this revelation, voter turnout dropped substantially with only 25% of registered Venezuelans voting and opposition parties withdrawing from the election. This resulted in Hugo Chávez's party, as well as his allied parties, to control 100% of Venezuela's National Assembly.

==== Alleged affiliations with government ====
Affiliations with Bolivarian government politicians raised suspicions, with instances of an interior vice minister, Morris Loyo Arnáez, being hired to lobby for Smartmatic contracts and with the company paying for the National Electoral Council (CNE) president Jorge Rodríguez and his sister Delcy Rodríguez to stay at the Boca Raton Resort & Club in Boca Raton, Florida. Vice Minister Loyo was paid $1.5 million by Smartmatic as a "sales commission" and his continual payments with the company eventually doubled.

A lawyer who had worked with Rodríguez, Moisés Maiónica, was allegedly employed by Smartmatic in order to provide legal and financial assistance to help with its selection for its 2004 elections. Years after the election in December 2008, Maiónica pled guilty in the United States District Court for attempting to cover up the Maletinazo scandal, an incident where Hugo Chávez attempted to finance Cristina Kirchner's 2007 Argentine Presidential Election campaign to influence Argentina's presidential election, with Maiónica stating that he was working for Venezuela's spy agency, the National Directorate of Intelligence and Prevention Services. Smartmatic has denied ever having a relationship with Maiónica.

==== Alleged obfuscation of Venezuelan ownership ====
Smartmatic's headquarters moved to London in 2012, while it also has offices and R&D labs in the United States, Brazil, Venezuela, Barbados, Panama, the United Kingdom, the Netherlands, the Philippines, Estonia, and Taiwan.

The Wall Street Journal wrote that "Smartmatic scrapped a simple corporate structure" of being based in Boca Raton "for a far more complex arrangement" of being located in multiple locations following the Sequoia incident. Though Smartmatic has made differing statements saying that they were either American or Dutch based, the United States Department of State stated that its Venezuelan owners "remain hidden behind a web of holding companies in the Netherlands and Barbados". The New York Times states that "the role of the young Venezuelan engineers who founded Smartmatic has become less visible" and that its organization is "an elaborate web of offshore companies and foreign trusts", while BBC News states that though Smartmatic says the company was founded in the United States, "its roots are firmly anchored in (Venezuela)". Multiple sources simply state that Smartmatic is a Venezuelan company. Smartmatic maintains that the holding companies in multiple countries are used for "tax efficiency".

==== 2017-2018 Venezuelan Constituent Assembly election ====
In 2017, Smartmatic, accused the Venezuelan socialist government of electoral fraud during Constituent Assembly election. Following these allegations, Smartmatic announced its withdrawal from conducting elections in Venezuela, terminating a 13-year commercial relationship. However, documents obtained by the Miami Herald from the Venezuelan National Electoral Council (CNE) showed that Smartmatic had licensed its software for use in three subsequent elections. These involved the December 2017 municipal elections and the controversial May 2018 presidential elections. According to sources, the use of Smartmatic's software in these elections was kept confidential, with the involvement of an Argentine company, Ex-Cle, to obscure Smartmatic's participation.

Juan Valera, Smartmatic's Associate Software Manager, was identified in an audit of the 2018 presidential elections as one of the external advisors. Sources indicated that Valera's primary role was to install certificates and activate the voting software. Despite Smartmatic's initial denial of involvement post-withdrawal, further communications suggested that the software was indeed utilized, though the company claimed it was not directly involved in the election processes. In a public statement released in July 2020, Smartmatic reiterated that it had not provided any products or services to the Venezuelan government following its 2017 exit. The company emphasized that authentic use of its software requires comprehensive involvement in the election's implementation and auditing phases, which they stated did not occur after the 2017 Constituent Assembly elections. Legal actions followed Smartmatic's departure. In June 2022, Smartmatic filed for arbitration with the International Centre for Settlement of Investment Disputes (ICSID), accusing the Venezuelan regime of threats and coercion following the company's exit. Additionally, in August 2022, Smartmatic's co-founder Roger Piñate was indicted by a federal grand jury in Florida for allegedly engaging in corruption and money laundering to secure.

=== United States ===
At local elections in 2006 in Chicago and Cook County, allegations arose that Smartmatic might have ties to the Venezuelan government. These allegations were picked up again in 2020 by a legal representative of President Donald Trump, who accused it of working with the socialist government of Venezuela in order to derail President Trump's reelection.

==== 2006 local elections ====
Following the 2004 Venezuelan recall election, Smartmatic acquired Sequoia Voting Systems, one of the leading US companies in automated voting products from the British company De La Rue in 2005. Following this acquisition, U.S. Representative Carolyn B. Maloney requested an investigation to determine whether the Committee on Foreign Investment in the United States (CFIUS) had followed correct processes to green-light sale of Sequoia to Smartmatic, which was described as having "possible ties to the Venezuelan government". The request was made after March 2006 following issues in Chicago and Cook County, where a percentage of the machines involved were manufactured by Sequoia, and Sequoia provided technical assistance, some by a number of Venezuelan nationals flown in for the event. According to Sequoia, the tabulation problems were due to human error, as a post-election check identified only three mechanical problems in 1,000 machines checked while election officials blamed poor training. Other issues were suspected to be related to software errors linked to the voting system's central computer.

Following the request, Smartmatic and Sequoia submitted a request to be reviewed by the CFIUS while also denying links to the Venezuelan government. The company disclosed that it was mainly owned by four Venezuelans—Antonio Mugica (78.8%), Roger Piñate (8.47%), Jorge Massa Dustou (5.97%), and Alfredo José Anzola (3.87%)—with a small amount of shares owned by employees (2.89%). Smartmatic subsequently sold Sequoia and later withdrew from Cook County in December 2006.

==== 2020 presidential election and defamation lawsuits ====
For similar legal actions, see Dominion Voting Systems defamation lawsuits.

Smartmatic was the subject of accusations of fraud in the aftermath of the 2020 United States presidential election, notably promoted by the personal attorney to President Donald Trump, Rudy Giuliani, who asserted the company was founded by the former socialist Venezuelan leader Hugo Chávez and that it owned and provided software to a related company, Dominion Voting Systems. Giuliani asserted Dominion is a "radical-left" company with connections to antifa that sent American voting data to foreign Smartmatic locations. Others falsely asserted that Smartmatic was owned by George Soros and that the company owned Dominion. Smartmatic voting machines were not used in any of the battleground states that determined Joe Biden's election victory.

These accusations against Smartmatic were made on conservative television outlets, and the company sent them a letter demanding a retraction and threatening legal action. Fox Business host Lou Dobbs had been outspoken during his program about the accusations; on 18 December his programme aired a video segment refuting the accusations, consisting of an interview with Edward Perez, an election technology expert at the Open Source Election Technology Institute, which fact checked allegations regarding the company (including those that had been made by Fox). Dobbs himself did not comment. Fox News hosts Jeanine Pirro and Maria Bartiromo had also been outspoken about the allegations, and both their programs aired the same video segment over the following two days. On 21 December, Newsmax similarly complied with the request and presented an on-air clarification.

The New York Times media journalist Ben Smith noted the possibility that a major defamation lawsuit could be filed against the outlets, drawing parallels with a 2012 lawsuit filed against ABC News by Beef Products Inc. over reports on "pink slime" that the company considered disparaging.

On 4 February 2021, Smartmatic sued Fox Corporation, Fox News Network, and its anchors Lou Dobbs, Maria Bartiromo, and Jeanine Pirro for $2.7 billion in the New York State Supreme Court as well as Rudy Giuliani and Sidney Powell, who spread baseless claims of election fraud on Fox. The 276-page complaint alleges that Fox, its anchors, Giuliani, and Powell spread a "conspiracy to defame and disparage Smartmatic and its election technology and software", damaging its business and making it difficult for the company to attract new customers. Since 5 February 2021, Dobbs has been replaced with other anchors at Fox Business. On 17 August 2021, a New York State Supreme Court judge questioned lawyers for Powell, Giuliani, and Fox News about the claims made about Smartmatic. On 3 November 2021, Smartmatic sued Newsmax and One America News Network (OANN) in the state courts of Delaware for promoting false claims of election fraud. On 18 January 2022, Smartmatic sued Mike Lindell and My Pillow for defamation, accusing Lindell of defaming the company to sell pillows.

On 7 February 2022, Newsmax Media Inc countersued Smartmatic denying it defamed the election software firm and claiming they were trying to censor and silence them. Newsmax's filing stated, "The action brought by Smartmatic against Newsmax arises from and is because of Newsmax's exercise of its right to free speech in connection with issues of public interest."

New York Supreme Court Justice David B. Cohen ruled on 8 March 2022 that the suit against Fox News could proceed, though he dismissed allegations against Powell and Pirro, and some claims against Giuliani letting others move forward. Cohen allowed allegations against Bartiromo and Dobbs to stand. Fox News, Bartiromo, Dobbs, and Giuliani filed an appeal against Cohen's decision.

While letting other claims against Giuliani proceed, Judge Cohen dismissed Smartmatic's claims about product disparagement against him. The Court agreed with Giuliani's legal team that Smartmatic's claims about how much his statements disparaging their software would affect the company's future earnings were not specific enough but were conjectural, speculative, and general. The Court also agreed with Giuliani's lawyers that he had only made claims about Smartmatic USA Corp (SUSA) and had not made claims about the company that owns it - Smartmatic International Holding B.V. (SIH), nor the company that owns SIH - SGO Corporation Limited (SGO). Therefore, it dismissed the defamation claims against him made by SIH and SGO.

Judge Cohen held that an "alleged misstatement by Pirro was not defamatory," reasoning that "Although Pirro states elsewhere that the Democrats 'stole votes' she does not specify that the votes were stolen using [Smartmatic] software. Therefore, the complaint is dismissed". In contrast, his ruling concerning Powell was on jurisdictional grounds. He held that the case against her could not proceed in the state's courts as her claims about Smartmatic "weren't sufficiently tied to the state of New York." He explained "Her only defamation-related contacts with this state were her appearances on Fox News, which is broadcast from its studios in New York City, and there is no allegation that she came to New York to personally appear on Fox News." Responding to the ruling on Powell, Smartmatic's legal team told reporters that, anticipating this possibility, on 12 November 2021, they had "already filed a lawsuit in DC and asked to stay the proceedings until the New York court ruled," and would be considering whether to appeal the issue in New York or proceed against her in Washington D.C. On 22 March 2022, Smartmatic announced it did "not intend to pursue an appeal of Powell's dismissal from the New York Action for lack of personal jurisdiction," instead they would be moving forward in D.C., asking that Court to "set a schedule for Ms. Powell to answer or otherwise plead to the complaint in this matter." The Court asked Powell to file a response by 6 May 2022. Earlier, in email correspondence with Forbes, Powell called Smartmatic's lawsuit "just another political maneuver motivated by the radical left that has no basis in fact or law."

Fox News filed a counterclaim against Smartmatic, on 17 March 2022, saying that the voting machine manufacturer had violated anti-SLAPP laws, which were passed to protect media companies from abusive litigation. Fox maintained that Smartmatic's claim that it suffered $2.7 billion in losses was massively inflated and that the company had been losing millions in the years before the election. The court was asked to rule that Smartmatic must pay Fox's attorneys' fees and "other and further relief as the Court deems just and proper." Fox held that Smartmatic was engaged in a "First Amendment-denying lawsuit" and that punishing them "may cause the next plaintiff to think twice before trying to penalize the press to the tune of billions of dollars in nonexistent damages."

On 19 May 2022, U.S. District Judge Carl Nichols dismissed a defamation lawsuit brought against Smartmatic (and also Dominion Voting Systems Inc.) while also imposing sanctions on Mike Lindell CEO of MyPillow. Lindell had sued the companies for defamation after they had filed suit for defamation against him. Lindell's filing said the companies had "weaponized" the courts in an act of "lawfare" to try to silence him. Nichols ruling said "The Court agrees with Smartmatic that Lindell has asserted at least some groundless claims" against them and some of those claims "falls on the frivolous side of the line." Nicols partially granted Smartmatic's motion for sanctions and fees against Lindell and his legal team for filing the suit against them, with the amount to be decided later. Lindell told reporters that he was unconcerned with the ruling as "I've got lawyers doing more important things like removing these machines from every state."

On 10 June 2022, Newsmax Media Inc. argued that Smartmatic's suit against them should be dismissed as there was "nothing inherently incredible" about the theory. They claimed that Smartmatic was formed by three Venezuelans with connections to the government of Hugo Chávez, was "the subject of widespread concerns about foreign influence" and that it "sold off a subsidiary rather than face additional scrutiny." The media company also maintained that Smartmatic had not taken enough action to alert news outlets that the post-election coverage about them was false. Smartmatic pointed reporters to its website which states "We do not have any alliances or relationships with any politician, political party, PAC, or government...Smartmatic's founders and employees adhere to a strict ethics code that, among other things, prohibits them from making political donations."

Rudy Giuliani filed a countersuit against Smartmatic in New York State Court on 14 June 2022, seeking to recoup legal fees in their lawsuit against him. His filing characterized their suit as baseless and held that it "interfered with his constitutional right to speak freely on issues of public concern." Holding their lawsuit amounted to censorship he claimed "Smartmatic's litigation tactics, including its facially implausible damages claims, are a naked attempt to attack a well-known public figure." Responding to the development, J. Erik Connolly, a lawyer representing the company stated "Smartmatic is confident in its claims against Mr. Giuliani." Covering the development Reuters noted that "Giuliani has had his New York law license suspended and faces ethics charges in Washington over his election claims."

On 21 June 2022, US District Judge Carl J. Nichols rejected OANN's call to dismiss Smartmatic's lawsuit against them. The media company had argued that it could not be sued in Washington, D.C. because its headquarters are located in California. Nichols rejected this pointing out that since they broadcast into D.C. and maintain a studio there, this gave the D.C. court jurisdiction.

In early July 2022, two lawyers from the U.K. based Kennedys Law LLP, Michael J. Tricarico and Marc Casarino joined Powell's legal team of Lawrence J. Joseph and J. Howard Kleinhendler in the defamation cases involving Smartmatic Corp. and Dominion Voting Systems. By 13 July 2022, Kleinhendler withdrew from the team. (He along with L. Lin Wood had worked alongside Powell challenging the election results of 2020 in what are sometimes referred to as the 'Kraken' cases.)

Media outlets, such as the Guardian, mentioned the lawsuit against Fox News in late July when excerpts of Jared Kushner's book Breaking History were released. According to Kushner, he spoke to Rupert Murdoch election night 2020 after Fox News reported that the electoral votes for Arizona had been won by Joe Biden. "I dialed Rupert Murdoch and asked why Fox News had made the Arizona call before hundreds of thousands of votes were tallied. Rupert said he would look into the issue, and minutes later, he called back. ...[Murdoch told him] 'Sorry Jared, there is nothing I can do. The Fox News data authority says the numbers are ironclad. He says it won't be close.'"

Former attorney General William Barr was subpoenaed by Smartmatic on 29 July 2022, for any communications he had with Fox News, including Rupert and Lachlan Murdoch. It also called for any communications he had with Rudy Giuliani, and any documents or communications he has given to the January 6 Committee. This was similar to a subpoena served to Barr by Dominion Voting machines a few weeks earlier.

Ruling from St. Paul, Minnesota, federal Judge Wilhelmina Wright sided with Smartmatic and denied MyPillow Inc. and Lindell's motion to dismiss their suit on 19 September 2022. She ruled that the company alleged facts "sufficient to suggest that Lindell knew or should have known that his statements were false and [he] acted with actual malice." Lindell's lawyers had claimed his statements were not defamatory because he "believes they are true" and his claims "are not inherently improbable."

On 26 September 2024, Newsmax and Smartmatic reached a settlement, hours after jury selection had begun. Newsmax paid Smartmatic $40 million.

As of September 2024, the case against Fox continues. In July 2024, Smartmatic subpoenaed four Fox Corporation board members.

=== Philippines ===
Smartmatic has been criticized by various entities for its motives and handling of elections in the Philippines. In opinion polls, voters have approved of Smartmatic's automated system used by the Commission on Elections (COMELEC), with 84% of respondents stating that they had "big trust" in the automated process according to a June 2019 Pulse Asia Research poll.

The Manila Times has stated that Smartmatic's system was unreliable, glitchy and vulnerable to tampering. After the newspaper reported that Smartmatic had been funneling voter information through "unofficial servers", The Manila Times ultimately called on officials from the country's electoral body, COMELEC, to resign. William Yu of the Parish Pastoral Council for Responsible Voting, an election NGO, stated that such servers perform "many other activities before the elections" and that it "does not necessarily, automatically mean that data has been transmitted", though he requested that COMELEC and Smartmatic provide an explanation.

In early 2017, The Manila Times reported that Smartmatic machines were equipped with SD cards where voter entries are recorded, citing Glenn Chong, a former congressman of the NGO Tanggulang Demokrasya (TANDEM) stating that "at least one SD card was tampered with", allegedly showing that Smartmatic's system was "very much open to hijacking or sabotage". A reviewer of the Philippine Linux Users' Group stated that hacking into Smartmatic's system is "very difficult for outsiders" and that "it's not as difficult to hack into the system if you're a COMELEC or a group of COMELEC or Smartmatic personnel", expressing importance of monitoring by COMELEC and asking the public to have good faith in the electoral body.

The IBON Foundation, a non-profit research organization based in the Philippines also criticized Smartmatic's system, stating in 2016 that "Why Smartmatic keeps on winning COMELEC contracts boggles the mind especially considering the numerous and major malfunctions by the machines and services that Smartmatic provided in the past two elections" and that there were "allegations of rigged bidding to favor Smartmatic such as designing contracts where only Smartmatic can qualify or omitting requirements that will otherwise disqualify Smartmatic".

==== 2010 elections ====
External videos
- Heated exchange between Teodoro Locsin Jr. and a Smartmatic representative over fraud allegations on YouTube

Prior to the elections, Filipino-Americans called on President Barack Obama to investigate the background of Smartmatic prior to the elections due to its links to the Venezuelan government. Smartmatic described these actions as "trying to rehash a story based on market share". Following allegations of fraud, some employees of Smartmatic had their passports temporarily held. At a fraud inquiry on 20 May 2010, Heider Garcia of Smartmatic was questioned on the transparency and what he called "unforeseen" occurrences during the election process, with Philippine official Teodoro Locsin Jr. – an automated poll advocate – sharply rebuking Garcia. On 29 June 2010, the Philippine Computer Society (PCS) filed a complaint with the country's Ombudsman against 17 officials of the Commission on Elections and the Smartmatic-TIM Corp. for alleged "incompetence", graft and unethical conduct.

==== 2016 elections ====
Days after the May 2016 elections, Bongbong Marcos, son of late President Ferdinand Marcos, alleged that Smartmatic had tampered with the votes which cost him being elected Vice President of the Philippines and criminal proceedings were filed by the COMELEC against COMELEC personnel as well as Smartmatic employees, with Election Commissioner Rowena Guanzon stating that Smartmatic had violated protocols. After a Smartmatic employee fled the country, Bongbong Marcos accused the COMELEC for his "escape", though two other Smartmatic personnel, one from Venezuela and the other from Israel, were present for criminal proceedings. In July 2016, it was reported that Smartmatic funneled votes through "unofficial servers". In an October 2016 editorial, The Manila Times called on all members of COMELEC to resign due to the "innumerable controversies since its adoption of the Smartmatic-based Automated Election System".

On 7 June 2017, the Department of Justice (DOJ) indicted "several Smartmatic and COMELEC personnel for changing the script in the election transparency server on election night during the May 2016 national and local polls". Those charged with the tampering include Marlon Garcia (the head of the Smartmatic's Technical Support Team) as well as two other Smartmatic employees, Neil Baniqued and Mauricio Herrera, and COMELEC IT employees Rouie Peñalba, Nelson Herrera, and Frances Mae Gonzales. The six were charged with "illegal access, data interference, and system interference" under the Cybercrime Prevention Act.

In August 2017, it was revealed that COMELEC Chairman Andres Bautista was allegedly paid commissions by Divina Law while serving as chairman "for assisting the law firm clients with the COMELEC". Divina Law, a firm that provides legal advice to Smartmatic. Bautista admitted that he obtained "referral fees", but denied that it was due to his position in COMELEC. According to House Deputy Minority Leader Harry Roque, the incident is "a very clear case of bribery" by Smartmatic.

In August 2024, the United States Department of Justice announced that the Florida US federal grand jury indicted Andres Bautista, including Roger Piñate and Smartmatic officers Elie Moreno and Jose Miguel Velasquez. From 2015 and 2018, Bautista was charged with acceptance of $1 million bribes from the three suspects relating to 2016 Philippine presidential election, in violation of the FCPA, money laundering and international laundering of monetary instruments. The evidence was submitted by the DOJ and the Ombudsman. Roger Piñate and Jorge Miguel Vasquez surrendered in a Miami Federal Court and were released upon posting bail bonds in the amount of $8.5 million and $1-million bond, respectively.

== See also ==
- DRE voting machine
- Electronic Voting
- Election security
- Dominion Voting Systems
