= Dominion Voting Systems =

Electronic voting systems company

Dominion Voting Systems Corporation
- Type: Private
- Industry: Electronic voting hardware
- Founded: 2002
- Founders: John Poulos; James Hoover
- Fate: Purchased and renamed in 2025
- Successor: Liberty Vote
- Headquarters: Toronto, Ontario, Canada; Denver, Colorado, U.S.
- Key people: John Poulos (CEO)
- Owners: Staple Street Capital (76%); John Poulos (12%); PennantPark Investment
- Subsidiaries: Premier Election Solutions; Sequoia Voting Systems
- Website: dominionvoting.com at the Wayback Machine (archived 2025-04-02) libertyvote.com

Dominion Voting Systems Corporation was a North American company that produced and sold electronic voting hardware and software, including voting machines and tabulating machines, in Canada and the United States.

In 2025, Scott Leiendecker purchased the company under a new company called Liberty Vote.

== Company ==
Based in Toronto, Ontario, where it was founded, and Denver, Colorado, it developed software in offices in the United States, Canada, and Serbia. Dominion produced electronic voting machines, which allowed voters to cast their votes electronically, and optical scanning devices used to tabulate paper ballots.

Its voting machines have been used in countries around the world, primarily in Canada and the United States. Dominion systems were employed in Canada's major party leadership elections, and across the nation in local and municipal elections.

Dominion products had been increasingly used in the United States. In the 2020 United States presidential election, equipment manufactured by Dominion was used to process votes in twenty-eight states, including the swing states of Wisconsin and Georgia.

It was the subject of extensive attention following the election, in which incumbent president Donald Trump was defeated by Joe Biden, with Trump and various surrogates promoting conspiracy theories that falsely alleged that Dominion was part of an international cabal that stole the election from Trump, and that it used its voting machines to transfer millions of votes that had been cast for Trump instead to Biden.

There was no evidence supporting these claims, which have been debunked by various groups including election technology experts, government and voting industry officials, and the Cybersecurity and Infrastructure Security Agency (CISA). The conspiracy theories were further discredited by hand recounts of the ballots cast in the 2020 presidential elections in Georgia and Wisconsin; the hand recounts in these states found that Dominion voting machines had accurately tabulated votes, that any error in the initial tabulation was instead caused by human error, and that Biden had defeated Trump in both swing states.

== History ==
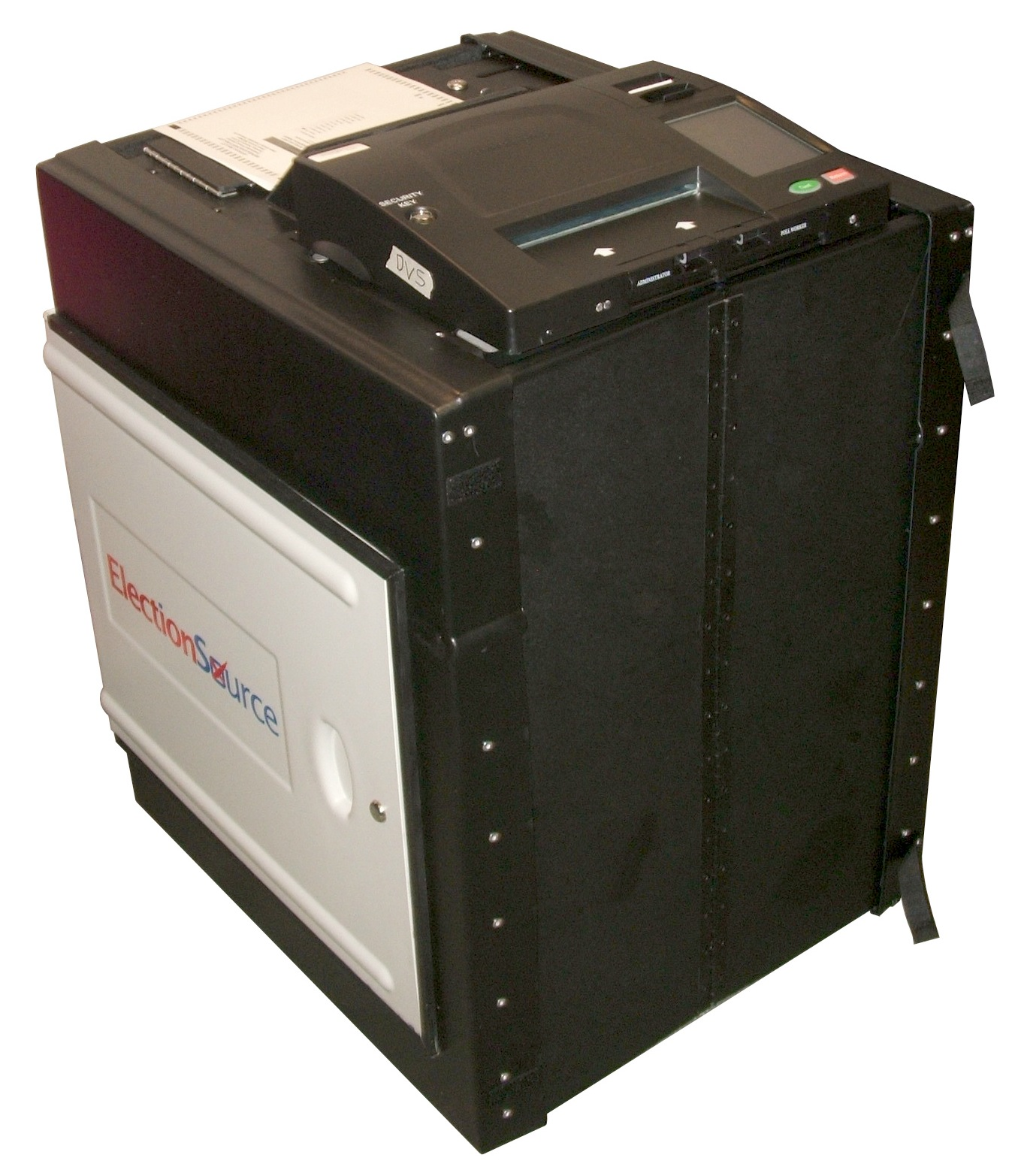
A Dominion ImageCast precinct-count optical-scan voting machine, mounted on a collapsible ballot box made by ElectionSource

Dominion Voting Systems Corporation was founded in 2002 in Toronto, Ontario, Canada, by John Poulos and James Hoover, and was incorporated on January 14, 2003. Its name derives from the Dominion Elections Act.

With headquarters in Toronto, Ontario, and Denver, Colorado, the firm developed proprietary software in-house and sells electronic voting hardware and software, including voting machines and tabulators, in the U.S. and Canada and employs a development team in its Serbian office.

In 2018, it was acquired by its management and Staple Street Capital, a private equity firm.

In December 2020 and January 2021, Fox News, Fox Business, Newsmax, and the American Thinker withdrew allegations they had reported about Dominion and Smartmatic after one or both companies threatened legal action for defamation.

In January 2021, it filed defamation lawsuits against former Trump campaign lawyers Sidney Powell and Rudy Giuliani, seeking US$1.3 billion in damages from each. After Dominion filed its lawsuit against Powell, One America News Network (OANN) removed all references to Dominion and Smartmatic from its website, though without issuing public retractions.

During subsequent months, Dominion filed suits seeking $1.6 billion in damages from each of Fox News, Newsmax, OANN and former Overstock.com CEO Patrick Byrne, while also suing Mike Lindell and his corporation, My Pillow. Despite motions by the defendants to dismiss the lawsuits, judges ruled that the cases against Fox News, Lindell, and MyPillow could proceed.

Fox News settled the lawsuit with Dominion Voting Systems for $787.5 million in April 2023, shortly before it was due to go to trial. A month later, Dominion CEO John Poulos told Time magazine that the company expected to lose customers and thus would be unlikely to stay in business.

In 2025, Scott Leiendecker, a former Republican Missouri election official and leader of e-pollbook manufacturer KnowInk, purchased Dominion Voting Systems under a new company called Liberty Vote.

=== Acquisitions ===
In May 2010, Dominion acquired Premier Election Solutions, formerly Diebold Election Systems, Inc., from Election Systems & Software (ES&S). ES&S had just acquired Premier from Diebold and was required to sell off Premier by the United States Department of Justice over anti-trust concerns. In June 2010, Dominion acquired Sequoia Voting Systems.

=== Officers ===
Poulos, President and CEO of Dominion, has a BSc in electrical engineering from the University of Toronto and an MBA from INSEAD. Hoover, Vice President, has an MSc in mechanical engineering from the University of Alberta.

== Equipment ==
Dominion Voting Systems (DVS) sold electronic voting systems hardware and software, including voting machines and tabulating machines, in the United States and Canada. This equipment includes the DVS ImageCast Evolution (ICE), ImageCast X (ICX), and ImageCast Central (ICC).

ImageCast Evolution is an optical scan tabulator designed for use in voting precincts that scans and tabulates marked paper ballots. The ICE will also mark ballots for voters with disabilities using an attached accessibility device that enables all voters to cast votes with paper ballots on the same machine. When a marked paper ballot is inserted, the tabulator screen display messages indicating whether the ballot has been successfully input. Causes of rejection include a blank ballot, an overvoted ballot, and unclear marks. After the polls close, results from the encrypted memory cards of each ICE tabulator can be transferred and uploaded to the central system to tally and report the results.

ImageCast X is described as an accessible ballot-marking device that allows a voter to use various methods to input their choices. An activation card is required for use, which is provided by a poll worker. The machine has audio capability for up to ten languages, as required by the U.S. Department of Justice, and includes a 19" full-color screen for visual operation, audio and visual marking interfaces and Audio-Tactile Interface (ATI). ATI is a hand-held controller that coordinates with headphones and connects directly to the ICE. During the voting process, the machine generates a marked paper ballot that serves as the official ballot record. The display can be adjusted with contrast and zoom functions that automatically reset at the end of the session. The ATI device has raised keys with tactile function, includes the headphone jack and a T-coil coupling, and has a T4 rating for interference. It uses light pressure switches and may be equipped with a pneumatic switch, commonly known as "sip-n-puff", or a set of paddles.

ImageCast Central uses commercial off-the-shelf Canon DR-X10C or Canon DR-G1130 scanners at a central tabulation location to scan vote-by-mail and post-voting ballots like provisional ballots, ballots requiring duplication and ballots scanned into multi-precinct ICE tabulators. The results are dropped into a folder located on the server where they can be accessed by the Adjudication Client software.

== Software ==
DVS voting machines operate using a suite of proprietary software applications, including Election Management System, Adjudication Client, and Mobile Ballot Printing. The software allows for various settings, including cumulative voting, where voters can apply multiple votes on one or more candidates, and Ranked Order Voting, where voters rank candidates in order of choice and the system shifts votes as candidates are eliminated.

The Election Management System (EMS) includes a set of applications that handle pre- and post-voting activities, including ballot layout, programming media for voting equipment, generation of audio files, importing results data, and accumulating and reporting results.

Adjudication Client is a software application with administrative and ballot inspection roles. It allows a jurisdiction to resolve problems in a ballot on screen that would normally be rejected, to be remade or hand counted because of one or more exceptional conditions like a blank ballot, write-ins, over-votes, marginal marks and under-votes. The application configures user accounts, reasons for exception, batch management and report generation, which in some jurisdictions must be performed by an administrator directly on a server. Ballot inspection allows users to review ballots with exceptional conditions and either accept or resolve the ballot according to state laws. Each adjudicated ballot is marked with the username of the poll worker who made the change.

Mobile Ballot Printing operates in conjunction with the EMS, which creates printable ballot images in .pdf format including tints and watermarks. The image is exported to a laptop and then printed on blank paper to provide a ballot record. After configuration and setup are complete, the laptop only contains geopolitical information and no voter data. The system will also generate reports in Microsoft Excel, Microsoft Word and .pdf format, including total number of ballots printed and ballot style.

== Operations ==
=== United States ===
Dominion is the second-largest seller of voting machines in the United States. In 2016, its machines served 70 million voters in 1,600 jurisdictions. In 2019, the state of Georgia selected Dominion Voting Systems to provide its new statewide voting system beginning in 2020.

In total, 28 states used Dominion voting machines to tabulate their votes during the 2020 United States presidential election, including most of the swing states. Dominion's role in this regard led supporters of then-President Donald Trump to suspect the trustworthiness of the company's voting machines, following Trump's loss to Joe Biden in the election.

Dominion has also been used in Puerto Rico, though in 2024 the Puerto Rico State Commission on Elections stated it was considering ending the contract with Dominion after hundreds of discrepancies in vote totals were found.

The Secretary of State of Texas office has rejected three of Dominion's products (Assure 1.3, Democracy Suite 5.5, and Democracy Suite 5.5-A) from being used in any jurisdiction in the state.

=== Canada ===
In Canada, Dominion's systems are deployed nationwide. Currently, Dominion provides optical scan paper ballot tabulation systems for provincial elections, including Ontario and New Brunswick. Dominion also provides ballot tabulation and voting systems for Canada's major party leadership elections, including those of the Liberal Party of Canada, the Conservative Party of Canada, and the Progressive Conservative Party of Ontario.

Ontario was the first Canadian province to use Dominion's tabulator machines in select municipalities in the 2006 municipal elections. New Brunswick used Dominion's 763 tabulator machines in the 2014 provincial elections. There were some problems with the reporting of tabulator counts after the election, and at 10:45 p.m. Elections New Brunswick officially suspended the results reporting count with 17 ridings still undeclared. The Progressive Conservatives and the People's Alliance of New Brunswick called for a hand count of all ballots. Recounts were held in 7 of 49 ridings and the results were upheld with variations of 1–3 votes per candidate per riding. This delay in results reporting was caused by an off-the-shelf software application unrelated to Dominion.

In June 2018, Elections Ontario used Dominion's tabulator machines for the provincial election and deployed them at 50 percent of polling stations.

Dominion's architecture was also widely used in the 2018 Ontario municipal elections on October 22, 2018, particularly for online voting. However, 51 of the province's municipalities had their elections impacted when the company's colocation centre provider imposed an unauthorized bandwidth cap due to the massive increase in voting traffic in the early evening, thus making it impossible for many voters to cast their vote at peak voting time. The affected municipalities extended voting times to compensate for the glitch; most prominently, the city of Greater Sudbury, the largest city impacted by the cap, extended voting for a full 24 hours and announced no election results until the evening of October 23.

== Controversy ==
=== 2020 U.S. presidential election ===
Following the 2020 United States presidential election, Donald Trump, his attorneys, and other right-wing personalities amplified the unfounded rumours originated by the proponents of the far-right QAnon conspiracy theory that Dominion Voting Systems had been compromised, supposedly resulting in millions of votes intended for Trump either being deleted or going to rival Joe Biden. Within days after the election, the Trump campaign had prepared an internal memo on several of the allegations against Dominion, and found them to be baseless. Trump persisted in the claims, citing the pro-Trump One America News Network media outlet, which itself claimed to cite a report from Edison Research, an election monitoring group. Edison Research said that they did not write such a report, and that they had "no evidence of any voter fraud".

Trump and others also made unsubstantiated claims that Dominion had close ties to the Clinton family or other Democrats. There is no evidence for any of these claims, which have been debunked by various groups including election technology experts, government and voting industry officials, and the CISA. On November 12, 2020, CISA released a statement that confirmed "there is no evidence that any voting system deleted or lost votes, changed votes or was in any way compromised". The statement was signed by various government and voting industry officials including the presidents of the National Association of State Election Directors and the National Association of Secretaries of State.

Trump's personal attorney Rudy Giuliani made several false assertions about Dominion, including that its voting machines used software developed by a competitor, Smartmatic, which he claimed actually owned Dominion, and which he said was founded by the former socialist Venezuelan leader Hugo Chávez. Giuliani also falsely asserted that Dominion voting machines sent their voting data to Smartmatic at foreign locations and that it is a "radical-left" company with connections to antifa. These accusations of a connection between Dominion and Smartmatic were made on conservative television outlets, and Smartmatic sent them a letter demanding a retraction and threatening legal action. Fox News host Lou Dobbs had been outspoken during his program about the accusations, and on December 18 his program aired a video segment refuting the accusations, though Dobbs himself did not comment. Fox News hosts Jeanine Pirro and Maria Bartiromo had also been outspoken about the allegations, and both their programs aired the same video segment over the following two days. Smartmatic also demanded a retraction from Newsmax, which had also promoted baseless conspiracy allegations about the company and Dominion, and on December 21 a Newsmax host acknowledged the network had no evidence the companies had a relationship, adding "No evidence has been offered that Dominion or Smartmatic used software or reprogrammed software that manipulated votes in the 2020 election." The host further acknowledged that Smartmatic is not owned by any foreign entity, nor is it connected to George Soros, as had been alleged. Dominion sent a similar letter to former Trump attorney Sidney Powell demanding she retract her allegations and retain all relevant records; the Trump legal team later instructed dozens of staffers to preserve all documents for any future litigation.

Powell also asserted she had an affidavit from a former Venezuelan military official, a portion of which she posted on Twitter without a name or signature, who asserted that Dominion voting machines would print a paper ballot showing whom a voter had selected, but change the vote inside the machine. Apparently speaking about the ICE machine, one source responded that this was incorrect, and that Dominion voting machines are only a "ballot marking device" system in which the voter deposits their printed ballot into a box for counting. In a March 2021 report, the Justice and Homeland Security Departments flatly rejected accusations of voting fraud conducted by foreign nations.

In a related hoax, Dennis Montgomery, a software designer with a history of making dubious claims, asserted that a program called Scorecard, running on a government supercomputer called Hammer, would be used to switch votes from Trump to Biden on voting machines. Trump legal team attorney Sidney Powell promoted the conspiracy theory on Lou Dobbs Tonight on November 6, and again two days later on Maria Bartiromo's Fox Business program, claiming to have "evidence that that is exactly what happened". She also asserted that the CIA ignored warnings about the software, and urged Trump to fire director Gina Haspel. Christopher Krebs, director of the Cybersecurity and Infrastructure Security Agency (CISA), characterized the supercomputer claim as "nonsense" and a "hoax". CISA described the 2020 election as "the most secure in American history", with "no evidence that any voting system deleted or lost votes, changed votes or was in any way compromised". A few days later, Trump fired Krebs by tweet, claiming that Krebs' analysis was "highly inaccurate".

After questions about the reliability of the company's systems surfaced during the election, Edward Perez, an election technology expert at the Open Source Election Technology Institute stated, "Many of the claims being asserted about Dominion and questionable voting technology is misinformation at best and, in many cases, they're outright disinformation."

The disinformation campaign against Dominion led to their employees being stalked, harassed, and receiving death threats. Ron Watkins, a leading proponent of the QAnon conspiracy theory, posted videos on Twitter in early December of a Dominion employee using one of the machines, falsely stating that the employee was pictured tampering with election results. The employee received death threats as a result, and a noose was found hanging outside his home. Eric Coomer, Dominion's director of product strategy and security, went into hiding soon after the election due to fear for his and his family's safety. He said that his personal address had been posted online, as had those of everyone from his parents and siblings to ex-girlfriends. In one of their lawsuits, Dominion explained they had spent $565,000 on security as a result.

During the 2021 German federal election, the Center for Monitoring, Analysis and Strategy found that accusations of Dominion engaging in voter fraud were common among German far-right users of Telegram, despite the company's technology not being used in German elections.

In September 2022, officials in Fulton County, Pennsylvania, filed a lawsuit against Dominion, alleging that a third-party computer forensics expert had discovered a Python script infection on one of its voting machines, and that there was evidence that the machine had been connected to an external system located in Canada. Fulton County's lawsuit was dismissed in September 2023.

==== Defamation lawsuits ====
The Newsmax lawsuit was scheduled for trial in late September 2024. Delaware Superior Court judge Eric Davis, on April 9, 2025, found that Newsmax was liable for publishing false and defamatory statements related to the 2020 presidential election, though a jury is still required to decide whether Newsmax is liable for damages. Davis' decision was a partial victory for Dominion, and while the company has yet to prove actual malice, Newsmax's stock price fell 10% in the wake of the decision.

===== Coomer lawsuit =====
On December 22, 2020, lawyers representing Eric Coomer, Dominion's director of product strategy and security, having been forced to go into hiding due to death threats, filed a defamation lawsuit on his behalf in the state of Colorado. The filing stated that the "false and baseless" claims against him have caused "immense injury to Dr. Coomer's reputation, professional standing, safety, and privacy". Among those named in the lawsuit were the Trump campaign, Rudy Giuliani, Sidney Powell, conservative commentator Michelle Malkin, and Colorado businessman and activist Joseph Oltmann. Additionally, conservative media outlets OANN, Newsmax, and The Gateway Pundit were also named. Coomer asserted they had characterized him as a "traitor" and that as a result he was subjected to "multiple credible death threats". Coomer also said that Oltmann had falsely claimed in a podcast that Coomer had participated in a September 2020 conference call with members of Antifa, and that during the call he had said, "Don't worry about the election, Trump is not gonna win. I made f-ing sure of that. Hahahaha." In April 2021, Newsmax published a retraction and apology on its website, saying it "found no evidence" to support the allegations against Coomer. Powell, who had asserted there was a recording of Coomer saying this, acknowledged in a July 2021 deposition that no such recording existed. Dominion was not party to the suit, but released a statement saying, "Sidney Powell and many others — including some news organizations — have trampled on countless reputations as they pandered their ridiculous conspiracy theories."

On October 7, 2021, CNN reported that after examining over 2,000 pages of documents provided to the court, they had found that in sworn depositions to the court Giuliani stated that he had spent less than an hour reviewing allegations against Coomer and "didn't have the time" to fact check them before taking them public in a November 19, 2020 press conference where he called Coomer "a vicious, vicious man" who is "close to Antifa" and is "completely warped and he specifically says that they're going to fix this election". In a deposition Powell admitted to Coomer's lawyers that she did not have "a lot of specific knowledge about what Mr. Coomer personally did" in the supposed election conspiracy. She also admitted to Coomer's lawyers that her claim that he had been "recorded in a conversation with antifa members, saying that he had the election rigged for Mr. Biden", was mistaken as there was no such recording.

On December 22, 2021, Coomer filed a federal defamation lawsuit against far-right talk show host Clay Clark, as well as his ReAwaken America Tour and ThriveTime show.

The suit alleges that the defendants, through the traveling tour and a series of nationally published interviews, "monetized a false election fraud narrative" and "prompted a constant drumbeat of outright falsehoods intended to place [Eric] Coomer at the center of an imagined conspiracy to defraud the American people".

On April 5, 2022, Coomer filed a lawsuit in Denver District Court against MYPillow CEO Mike Lindell, along with his company, and his media platform Frankspeech for spreading the unsupported Oltmann claims and having "intentionally and persistently defamed Coomer as a 'traitor'".

On May 13, 2022, Colorado State District Judge Marie Avery Moses rejected motions to dismiss the case made by the Trump campaign, Powell, Giuliani, and other defendants. She ruled that there was evidence of actual malice which Coomer would need to prove in trial.

In August 2023, OANN and its correspondent Chanel Rion reached a settlement with Coomer.

==== Dominion Voting Systems v. Fox News Network ====
In March 2021, Dominion Voting Systems filed a $1.6 billion defamation lawsuit against Fox News Network, alleging that several of its program hosts and guests made false allegations that Dominion's voting machines had been rigged to steal the 2020 United States presidential election from then-president Donald Trump. Fox News responded that it was reporting news of what individuals were saying and was thus protected by the First Amendment to the Constitution. During pre-trial discovery, Dominion publicly released Fox News internal communications indicating that prominent hosts and top executives were aware the network was reporting falsehoods, but continued doing so.

The Delaware Superior Court judge hearing the complaint ruled in a March 2023 summary judgment that none of the statements Fox News made about Dominion were true and ordered the case to trial to determine if the network had acted with actual malice. The trial began on April 18 with several prominent Fox News personalities and senior executives expected to testify. Later that day, the case was settled for $787.5 million.]

=== 2026 United States elections ===
In October 2026, voters of Florida, Ohio, Texas, and Tennessee reported the voting machines changing to Republican candidates. Stella Parton posted in social media that the machine showed Marsha Blackburn, which became a senator. She reminded her followers to double check their ballot recording.

== See also ==
- Electronic voting
- Election security
- DRE voting machine
- Smartmatic, a British voting machine company
