= Antonio Mugica =

Venezuelan businessman

Antonio Mugica Rivero
- Born: May 1974 (age 52); Caracas, Venezuela
- Education: Universidad Simón Bolívar
- Occupations: Founder and CEO of Smartmatic

Antonio Mugica (born May 1974) is the founder and CEO of Smartmatic, a multinational electronic voting company. He also previously served as the Director of Anoto Group AB and Director of Panagroup Corporation.

== Early life ==
Antonio Mugica was born in 1974. He graduated from the Universidad Simón Bolívar in Caracas, Venezuela, where he earned an Electrical Engineering degree.

== Career ==
In the late 1990s, Mugica along with two other Venezuelan colleagues, Alfredo José Anzola and Roger Pinate, created a system where thousands of inputs could be placed into a network simultaneously. Early trials of this system were used on ATMs in Mexico, though after the 2000 United States presidential election, they decided instead to dedicate the system toward electoral functions.

Mugica has been an advocate for electronic and internet voting, election modernization, and digital democracy. Some of his views to bring in technological advancement in elections include: the need to create tools for engaging citizens through voting and participation in the governance process, making voting more accessible, making sure that comprehensive pre- and post-election audits become a common practice, and the significance of investing in research and development in the election technology market.

In 2022, Mugica was named a Strategic Advisor on election technology to Oxford University's Programme on Democracy & Technology, which is managed through the university's Oxford Internet Institute.

=== Smartmatic ===
Smartmatic formed out of the SBC organization that was owned 51% by Smartmatic, 47% Venezuelan state telecommunications organization CANTV and 2% by an affiliated company, Bizta, also owned by the owners of Smartmatic, with a board member from the Bolivarian government during the time an industry-fostering loan from a government institution was in force. In 2004 Smartmatic was granted a contract worth $128 million with the CNE, the government's elections agency, to acquire its products (an automated voting system, voting machines and support services) for the Regional Elections scheduled for that year's 2nd semester. But then, after collecting the required number of citizens' signatures, the 2004 Venezuelan recall referendum was activated to remove Hugo Chávez from the presidency, and Smartmatic had to hastily tailor the Voting System to the changed requirements.

Smartmatic's election technology has been used in local and national elections in Venezuela, the United States, Belgium, Brazil, Ecuador, Argentina, Chile, the United Kingdom, Mexico, Estonia and the Philippines.

=== SGO Corporation ===
In 2014, Mugica together with British Lord Mark Malloch-Brown announced the launching of the SGO Corporation Limited, a holding company headquartered in London whose primary asset is the election technology and voting machine manufacturer Smartmatic.

Lord Malloch-Brown became chairman of the board of directors of SGO since its foundation, while Mugica remained as CEO of the new venture. They were joined on SGO’s board by Sir Nigel Knowles, Global CEO of DLA Piper, entrepreneur David Giampaolo and Roger Piñate, Smartmatic’s COO.

The aim of SGO, according to Mugica is "to continue to make investments in its core business (election technology), but it is also set to roll out a series of new ventures based on biometrics, online identity verification, internet voting and citizen participation, e-governance and pollution control.”

=== Patents ===
As of 2016, Antonio Mugica holds 13 granted and over 10 pending patents in the United States.

== Personal life ==
Mugica has also dedicated time toward playing and composing music, writing and collecting modern and contemporary art.

In 2010, he wrote Húkiti-Túkiti-Tá, a children's book. Written in verse, it is a story on healthy eating. The tale is about Hookity-Tookity-Tah, a wizard baker boy who uses his cooking magic to rid his town of a bullying dragon.

== Awards and recognition ==
- 2011 Moonbeam Children's Book Awards Gold Medal in Spanish Category for Húkiti-Túkiti-Tá.

== Works ==
- Mugica, Antonio (2010). Húkiti-Túkiti-Tá. Multiple Personality Entertainment. ISBN 978-9962552406.
