= Electoral roll =

List of persons who are eligible to vote in a particular electoral district

An electoral roll (variously called an electoral register, voters roll, voters list, poll book or other description) is a compilation that lists citizens who are entitled to vote for particular elections in a particular jurisdiction. The list is usually broken down by electoral districts, and is primarily prepared to assist election officials at polling places. Most jurisdictions maintain permanent electoral rolls, which are updated continuously or periodically (such as France which updates them annually), while some jurisdictions compile new electoral rolls before each election. Electoral rolls are the result of a process of voter registration. In most jurisdictions, voter registration (and being listed on an electoral roll) is a prerequisite for voting at an election. Some jurisdictions do not require voter registration, and do not use electoral rolls, such as the state of North Dakota in the United States. In those jurisdictions a voter must provide identification and proof of entitlement to vote before being permitted to vote.

Electoral rolls and voter registration serve a number of functions, especially to streamline voting on election day. Voter registration can be used to detect electoral fraud by enabling authorities to verify an applicant's identity and entitlement to a vote, and to ensure a person doesn't vote multiple times. In jurisdictions where voting is compulsory, the electoral roll is used to indicate who has failed to vote. In some jurisdictions, people to be selected for jury or other civil duties are chosen from an electoral roll. In jurisdictions which allow multiple citizenships the exchange of electoral roll information between two countries prevents double voting in two countries.

Most jurisdictions close updating of electoral rolls some period, commonly 14 or 28 days, before an election, but some jurisdictions may allow registration at the same time as attending a polling station to vote; Australia closes its rolls seven days after an election is called, rather than with reference to the election day.

Traditionally, electoral rolls were maintained in paper form, either as loose-leaf folders or in printed pages, but nowadays electronic electoral rolls are increasingly being adopted. Similarly, the number of countries adopting biometric voter registration has steadily increased. As of 2016, half of the countries in Africa and Latin America use biometric technology for their electoral rolls.

== Australia ==
Australia maintains a permanent electoral roll, which is used for federal elections, by-elections and referendums. It also forms the basis of state (except in Western Australia, which compiles its own) and local electoral rolls.

Enrolment is compulsory for all Australian citizens over the age of 18 years (with the exception of Norfolk Island, where enrolment is voluntary). Residents in Australia who had been enrolled as British subjects in 1984, though not Australian citizens, can continue to be enrolled. (These comprise about 9% of the electoral roll.) Normally, enrolment and change of details requires the lodgement of a form; but since 2009, New South Wales automatically updates enrolment details onto the state roll, but not the federal roll, from various government departmental sources. State civil registrars are required to supply information, for example relating to death of a person, to enable names of deceased persons to be removed from electoral rolls.

When an election is called, a date for the "close of roll" is also announced, on which date processing of enrolments and changes of details to the roll is suspended. Enrolment or change of details can be done online or by completing a form and sending it using regular mail, which must arrive by the deadline.

Currently, the electoral roll records just the name and address of the voter, although in previous years occupation was also recorded. Since 21 July 2004 the Commonwealth electoral roll cannot be sold in any format. It has not been produced in printed format since 1985, when it changed to publication on microfiche. Today, it is only produced in an electronic format, and can only be viewed at an Australian Electoral Commission or state electoral commission offices, each of which holds a copy of the electoral roll for the entire country. These arrangements try to strike a balance between privacy of the voters and the publication of the roll, which is integral to the conduct of free and fair elections, enabling participants to verify the openness and accountability of the electoral process and object to the enrolment of any elector. The elector information is provided to political parties, members of Parliament and candidates.

== Belgium ==
Belgian citizens over the age of 18 who are registered in the population registers of each municipality are included on a voters' list.

Foreign nationals may apply to be registered on the voters' list for municipal elections, and nationals of the European Union may register for elections for the European Parliament. Approval as a voter remains valid for subsequent elections (unless waived in writing) and in the event of a change of residence in Belgium.

== France ==
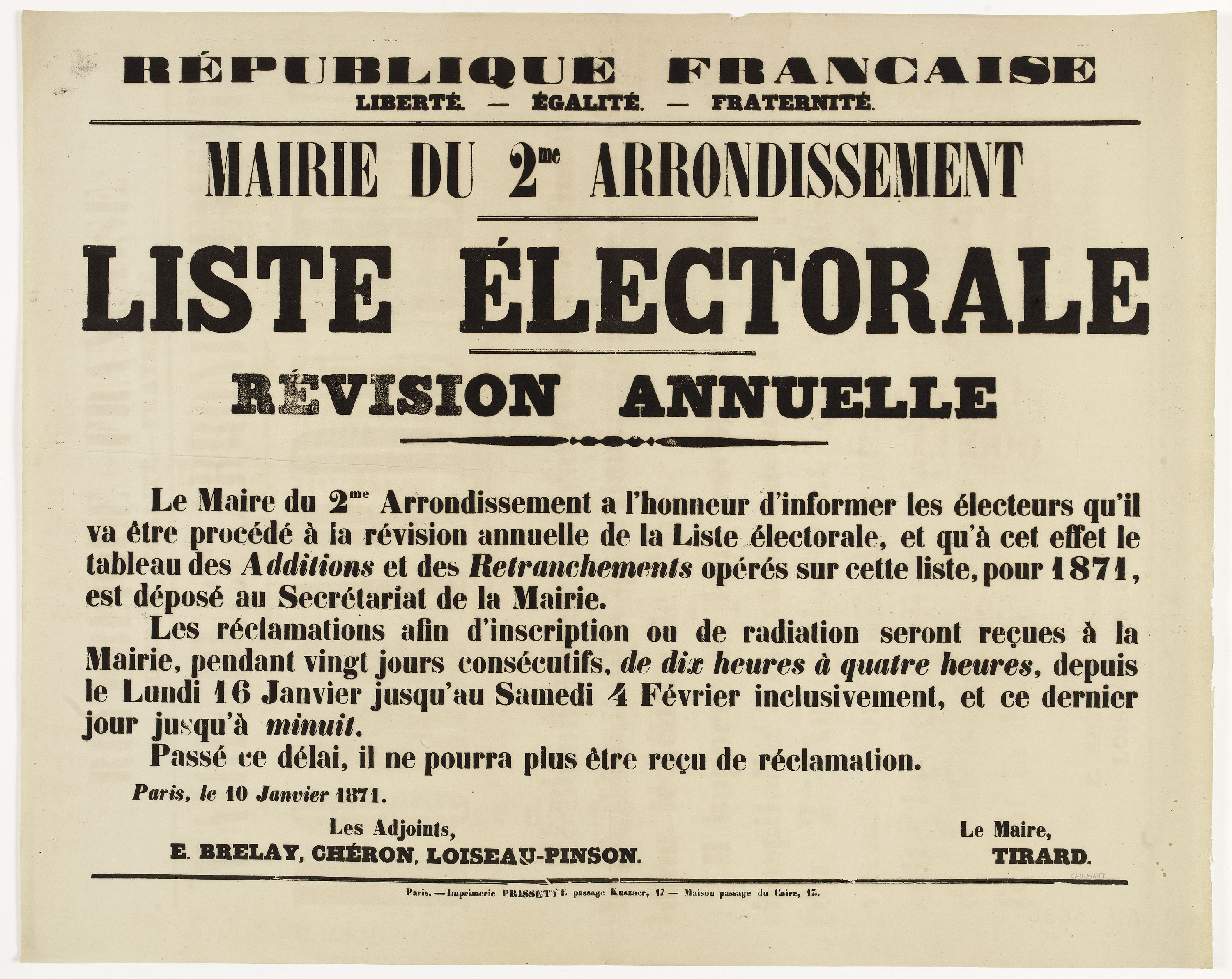
Announcement of the annual revision of the electoral list of the 2nd arrondissement of Paris (1871)

Each municipality maintains a permanent electoral list which is updated annually. Only registered voters can vote. A complementary list is prepared for nationals of a Member State of the European Union for French ballots open to them, namely for European and municipal elections. Each voter has an obligation to be registered on only one electoral list, but there is no penalty, other than being prevented from voting.

Since November 2009, pilot online registration has been permitted for a few municipalities, but was expected to expand.

== Hong Kong ==
The electoral roll in Hong Kong is maintained by the Registration and Electoral Office (REO). The final register is available every year on 25 July, except for years in which elections for the territory's district councils are held, when the final register is available on 15 September. All permanent residents of the territory, a status which required seven years of continuous residence, are eligible to be registered voters regardless of nationality or citizenship.

== India ==
In India, publishing and updating of the electoral roll is the responsibility of the Election Commission of India, each state's chief electoral officers, and each state's election commission. These government bodies update and publish the electoral roll every year, making it available for download from official government websites.

Total voters in India as on 1 January 2019

- Total voters: 866,913,278.
- Men: 451,966,704.
- Women: 414,912,901.
- Third gender: 33,673.

State wise electoral details for Lok Sabha election 2019:-

No.	State/Territory name	Men	Women	Third gender
1.	Andhra Pradesh	17162603	17409676	3146
2.	Arunachal Pradesh	383804	389054	0
3.	Assam	10627005	10004509	377
4.	Bihar bihar	36346421	32070788	2119
5.	Chhattisgarh	9112766	8958481	721
6.	Goa	545531	562930	0
7.	Gujarat	22265012	20325250	553
8.	Haryana	9027549	7792344	0
9.	Himachal Pradesh	2458878	2352868	6
10.	Jammu and Kashmir	3904982	3548312	45
11.	Jharkhand	11256003	10202201	123
12.	Karnataka	24837243	24045264	4404
13.	Kerala	12202869	13085516	6
14.	Madhya Pradesh	26195768	23772022	1135
15.	Maharashtra	43940543	39542999	1645
16.	Manipur	925431	968312	0
17.	Meghalaya	850667	868802	0
18.	Mizoram	362181	377795	0
19.	Nagaland	577793	560422	0
20.	Odisha	15946303	14890584	2146
21.	Punjab	10502868	9375422	415
22.	Rajasthan	23117744	20855740	45
23.	Sikkim	200220	188836	0
24.	Tamil Nadu	29574300	30155515	5074
25.	Telangana	14472054	13840715	2351
26.	Tripura	1275694	1230212	0
27.	Uttar Pradesh	76809778	64436122	7272
28.	Uttarakhand	3923492	3572029	151
29.	West Bengal	34592448	32443796	1017
30.	Andaman and Nicobar Islands	146524	131464	0
31.	Chandigarh	305892	266194	13
32.	Dadra and Nagar Haveli	122184	105399	0
33.	Daman and Diu	58698	57861	0
34.	Delhi	7463731	6005703	829
35.	Lakshdweep	25372	24904	0
36.	Puducherry	446353	494860	80

== Ireland ==
The electoral register in Ireland is maintained by the local authorities and all residents that have reached 18 years of age in the state may register at the address in which they are 'ordinarily resident'. Each November a draft register is published after house-to-house enquiries. The register then comes into force the following February after time for appeals and additions. A supplementary register is published which allows voters to make alterations (usually change of address or becoming 18 years of age) prior to voting day. Postal votes are restricted to certain occupations, students and the disabled or elderly resident away from their home. There is also provision for special voters that are usually physically disabled.

While all residents can be registered voting in Ireland depends on citizenship. All residents are entitled to vote in local authority elections. Irish and EU citizens may vote in European parliament elections. Irish citizens and such other persons as are defined by law may vote in elections to Dáil Éireann,(any person entitled to vote for members of Dail Eireann i.e. entitled to vote for the president) for the President and in constitutional referendums.

The electoral register for elections to the six university seats in Seanad Éireann is maintained by the National University of Ireland and University of Dublin. Irish citizens that are graduates of these universities over 18 years of age may register. Voting is by postal vote and residence in the state is not required.

== New Zealand ==
Electoral rolls have been used in New Zealand since the late nineteenth century, and some are available in public libraries for genealogical research. Traditionally, the Māori indigenous people have had separate electoral registration; electoral rolls for the Māori were introduced in 1948. In 1975 electors of Māori descent were given the choice of whether to register on the Maori or "general" electoral registers, a choice which allows those who wish for the former to vote for MPs from Māori electorates.

== Russia ==
Electoral roll is formed from the population register and distributed to individual polling stations ten days before the voting. Corrections and additions to the roll are permitted both before and during the vote, via an in-person request at the polling station with a valid identity document (such as a passport with a record of registration within the precinct). Although most voters find themselves in the roll, a polling station typically has to process a few such requests.

The total number of voters in the roll at the end of the voting is included into the official results of each polling station and is publicly available.

== Singapore ==
The electoral roll, or "Registers Of Electors" is managed by the Elections Department Singapore, which was often published or updated months within the next revision of the boundaries changes and the date of the next election, in accordance with the Parliamentary Elections Act 1954(5). The revision is necessary for the role of Electoral Boundaries Review Committee, which evenly distribute the electorate across constituencies in each redistricting cycle, though it is not guaranteed that the constituency will have boundaries being affected. The electoral roll contains information of each elector about the eligibility, whether if the elector is currently residing in Singapore or at overseas, their identification number, and the code of the polling district based on their residence. As the constitution mandates compulsory voting, any electors who abstained their vote during election day (i.e. did not vote) will result in the elector's name being removed from the register and subject to electoral disqualification, and requires the name to be restored to reinstate the name back into the rolls.

== United Kingdom ==
Within the jurisdiction of the United Kingdom, the right to register for voting extends to all British, Irish, and Commonwealth citizens. British citizens (Note: Only British citizens can be overseas voters, others who would be eligible to vote within the UK cannot remain registered to vote after moving overseas, including British nationals and Irish and Commonwealth citizens – unless they are also a British citizen) living overseas may register for up to 15 years after they were last registered at an address in the UK. Before Brexit, EU citizens (who are not Commonwealth citizens or Irish citizens) could vote in European and local elections in the UK, elections to the Scottish Parliament and Welsh and Northern Ireland Assemblies (if they live in those areas) and some referendums (based on the rules for the particular referendum); they were not able to vote in British Parliamentary general elections. The minimum age for voting in Scotland, and Wales (for the devolved administration and local government elections only) is 16. In England and Northern Ireland, the minimum voting age is 18. It is possible for someone to register to vote before this birthday, as long as they will reach the voting age before the next revision of the register.

The register is compiled for each polling district, and held by the electoral registration office. In the United Kingdom, this office is located at the local council (district, borough, or unitary level). In Scotland, the offices are sometimes located with councils, but may also be separate. Northern Ireland has a central Electoral Office run by the government.

As of 2019, the register is compiled by sending an annual canvas form to every house (a process introduced by Representation of the People Act 1918). A fine of up to £1,000 (level 3 on the standard scale) can be imposed for giving false information. Up to 2001, the revised register was published on 15 February each year, based on a qualifying date of 10 October, and a draft register published on 28 November the previous year. From 2001 as a result of the Political Parties, Elections and Referendums Act 2000, the annual 'revised' register is published on 1 December, although it is possible to update the register with new names each month between January and September.

The register has two formats. The full version of the register is available for supervised inspection by anyone, by legal right. It is this register that is used for voting, and its supply and use is limited by law. Copies of this register are available to certain groups and individuals, such as credit reference agencies and political parties.

An 'edited' or 'open' version of the register, which omits those people who have chosen to 'opt out', can be purchased by anyone for any purpose. Some companies provide online searchable access to the edited register for a fee.

The Information Commissioner's Office, Electoral Commission, Local Government Association and the Association of Electoral Administrators have called for the abolition of the edited register. The organisations believe that the register should only be used for purposes related to elections and referendums, and that the sale of voters' personal details is a practice that may discourage people from registering to vote. The Political and Constitutional Reform Select Committee recommended the abolition of the edited register in its report on the Government's proposals for individual electoral registration and other electoral administration provisions. Other organisations, including credit reference agencies, debt collection agencies and direct marketing companies, have argued for the retention of the edited register. However, notwithstanding the above, Mark Harper MP, as Minister for Political and Constitutional Affairs in the Cameron–Clegg coalition, announced during the committee stage of the Electoral Registration and Administration Act 2013 on 25 June 2012 that the edited register will be retained.

The full register contains the following information:

- elector number (one or more characters indicating the polling district, followed by a number)
- elector's name and address
- date of birth (if the voter will become eligible to vote during the time period that the register covers)
- if the elector has requested a postal vote

A 'Marked Register' is a copy of the register that has a mark by the name of each elector who has voted. It serves as the record of who has voted in the election, and it is kept for a year after the election. After an election anyone can inspect the marked register, and certain people can purchase a copy of it. The marked register does not indicate who electors voted for, nor does it contain ballot paper numbers.

It was suggested that the register data could be taken from the data that was to be held on the proposed Citizen Information Project or on the National Identity Register. In January 2005 the Constitutional Affairs Committee and the Office of the Deputy Prime Minister began a joint inquiry into reforming the registration system. In January 2010 the Identity Documents Act 2010 repealed the Identity Cards Act 2006 which set up the National Identity Register.

Despite widespread calls for its introduction, the Electoral Administration Act 2006 did not provide for individual elector registration, on the justification that registration levels would fall. However, the Political Parties and Elections Act 2009 introduced a move from a system of household registration to a system of individual electoral registration in Great Britain.

== United States ==
In the United States electoral rolls are commonly referred to as poll books. They have been used since the founding to determine voting eligibility. Today, poll books are a list of persons who are eligible to vote in an election. In the United States, the roll is usually managed by a local entity such as a county or parish. However, the data used for electoral rolls may be provided by statewide sources. While traditional poll books are printed voter rolls, more recently electronic pollbooks have come into favor. Computerized electoral rolls allow for larger numbers of voters to be handled easily and allows for more flexibility in poll locations and the electoral process.

A number of states and the District of Columbia have automatic voter registration.

== See also ==
- Electronic pollbook
- Biometric voter registration
- Australia
  - Elections in Australia
  - Australian electoral system
  - Australian Electoral Commission
- New Zealand
  - New Zealand elections
  - Electoral system of New Zealand
- United Kingdom
  - Elections in the United Kingdom
