= Biometric voter registration =

Use of physical features for voter identification

Biometric voter registration implicates using biometric technology (capturing unique physical features of an individual – fingerprinting is the most commonly used), most of the times in addition to demographics of the voter, for polling registration and/or authentication. The enrollment infrastructure allows collecting and maintaining a database of the biometric templates for all voters.

A biometric voting project might include introducing biometric registration kits for enrolment of voters; using electronic voter identification devices before and on Election Day; issuing of voter identification documents (i.e. biometric voter cards), among others. The chronological stages for adopting a biometric voting registration project usually include assessment; feasibility studies; securing funding; reviewing legislation; doing pilot projects and mock registration exercises; procurement; distribution of equipment, installation, and testing; recruitment and training of staff; voter information; deployment and, post-election audits.

The final aim of implementing biometric election technology is achieving de-duplication of the voting register, thus preventing multiple voter registration and multiple voting; improving identification of the voter at the polling station, and mitigating the incidence of voter fraud (e.g. buy/rent of voters IDs before an election).

However, it is vital that commissions carrying out these election projects first and foremost guarantee that the legal framework supports biometric voter identification, and then that the data captured during the registration process will be secured while maintaining two basic requirements: personalization and privacy. Likewise, it is imperative to have contingency mechanisms in place, in case biometric systems malfunction. One of the main challenges is to ensure that given the eventualities of technological hitches and failures, not a single voter is disenfranchised.

== Countries with biometric voter registration ==
According to International IDEA's ICTs in Elections Database, as of 2016, the number of countries adopting biometrics in elections has steadily increased to over 50, with significant differences between regions. "While there are virtually no users in Europe, about half of the countries in Africa and Latin America use this technology in elections." Also as of 2016, 35 percent of over 130 surveyed Electoral Management Bodies is capturing biometric data (such as fingerprints or photos) as part of their voter registration process.

Countries which have used biometric voting registration include Armenia, Angola, Bangladesh, Bhutan, Bolivia, Brazil, Burkina Faso, Cambodia, Cameroon, Chad, Colombia, Comoros, Congo (Democratic Republic of), Costa Rica, Cote d'Ivoire, Dominican Republic, Fiji, Gambia, Ghana, Guatemala, India, Iraq, Kenya, Lesotho, Liberia, Malawi, Mali, Mauritania, Mexico, Morocco, Mozambique, Namibia, Nepal, Nicaragua, Nigeria, Panama, Peru, The Philippines, Senegal, Sierra Leone, Solomon Islands, Somaliland, Swaziland, Tanzania, Uganda, Uruguay, Venezuela, Yemen, Zambia, and Zimbabwe.

Remote biometric registration for online voting has been successfully piloted for public elections in the US, the Philippines and India.

== Advocacy and criticism ==
Some promoters of biometric voting registration point out that this technology, if properly customised to the country's needs and well implemented, could offer better accessibility for citizens; help avoiding long queues and waiting times for registration and voting; add simplicity and speed to the election cycle (e.g. voter identification documents can make it easier for polling staff to verify voter details); make voters and Commissions feel confident about the quality of their registry (more accurate, reliable and complete data); improve e-voting security, considerably reduce or eliminate multiple registration and multiple voting, while mitigating the risk of impersonation, identity theft, the misuse of records of deceased voters, carousel voting and ballot box stuffing.

On the other hand, those who criticise and disapprove the use of biometrics for voter identification maintain that using biometrics for election purposes raises concerns over voters' privacy, human dignity and governmental disclosure of personal information. Some critics go further to claim that biometrics in voting poses a serious threat to democracy, due to fears of violation of the secrecy of the vote (or correlation voter-vote).

The concerns as with any other application of biometrics for identification and authentication can be manifold. There is, for example, the possibility of voter disenfranchisement when characteristics typically used to identify or verify voters might become unavailable (e.g. bandaged finger, loss of a finger, failure to scan properly due to dirt or fingerprint quality degradation). Similarly, there are also claims of potential logistical and procedural "new problems" that biometric identification devices can bring to an election cycle: increasing costs (initial purchase costs of biometric readers and infrastructure, costs linked to maintenance, storage and upgrades) and resources' allocation (human, time, material); additional training of commissions and polling staff, technological failures that could disenfranchise voters; and extra data storage that demands higher security.

== See also ==
- Electoral roll
- Electronic identification
- Electronic pollbook
- Voter ID laws
