= Jorge Massa Dustou =

French-Venezuelan businessman (born 1944)

- Born: 1944 (age 81–82); France
- Education: Babson College; Central University of Venezuela
- Spouse: Ana Cisneros de Massa
- Relatives: Gustavo Cisneros (brother-in-law)

Jorge Massa Dustou is a French-Venezuelan businessman who is one of the wealthiest individuals in Venezuela. Massa is the president of Grupo Mistral, a Venezuelan pharmaceutical and manufacturing company.

== Early life ==
Massa's father and relatives moved to Venezuela in 1942 and entered into the pharmaceutical industry. Massa was born in France and spent his childhood in Venezuela.

== Education ==
Massa studied in Switzerland and the United States, receiving a Bachelor of Business Administration from Babson College and Master of Business Administration from Central University of Venezuela.

== Career ==
Massa worked for Grupo Cisneros until 1985, serving as the Vice President of the Industrial Division and Corporate Operations. In 1985, Massa founded Grupo Mistral.

=== Grupo Mistral ===
Health

- Farmahorro - branches of pharmacies located in Venezuela
- Drogería Farvenca - medication and pharmaceutical distributor

Packaging

- Proyecto Pet - bottling and packaging
- Ampofrasca - ampoule and vial production

Hygiene

- Pharsana - hygiene and cosmetic products
- Sanifarma - absorbent products such as pantyliners and diapers

Real estate

- Jomadus - manages office and commercial properties

==== Other ventures ====
Massa was the main investor of technology and election solution company Smartmatic.

== Honours and awards ==
Award or decoration	Country	Date	Place	Note
Order of Labour Merit, First Class	Venezuela	1984	Caracas	Recognizes Venezuelan workers with impeccable conduct and at least 30 years of service.
Order of Francisco de Miranda, First Class	Venezuela	1984	Caracas	Recognizes Venezuelan citizens and foreigners who have exemplified outstanding merits.

== Personal life ==
Massa lives with his wife, Ana Cisneros de Massa, the sister of Venezuelan billionaire Gustavo Cisneros, and they have three children; Ana Cristina, María Luisa and Fernando José. The two of them live in Millennium, a building in Madrid, Spain, that is home to the country's elite and millionaires.
