= Alfredo José Anzola =

Founder of Smartmatic

Alfredo José Anzola Jaumotte
- Born: 11 June 1974
- Died: 28 April 2008 (aged 33)
- Education: Andrés Bello Catholic University
- Occupations: Founder and former CFO of Smartmatic

Alfredo José Anzola Jaumotte (11 June 1974 – 28 April 2008) was a founder and the former CFO of Smartmatic, a multinational electronic voting company. Anzola was one of the architects of the SBC consortium, a strategic alliance between Smartmatic, the Bitza Corporation and Venezuela's telephone provider, CANTV, for managing the technology platform of elections in Venezuela.

== Early life ==
Alfredo José Anzola was born on 11 June 1974. His father was Alfredo Anzola Mendez, and his mother was Christina Jaumotte de Galavís. He was a grandson of Alfredo Anzola Montauban, a prestigious end affluent engineer, university professor and writer, who had a mixed Venezuelan-French ascent.

Alfredo José was childhood friends with Antonio Mugica, with whom he founded Smartmatic in 2000.

== Education ==
Alfredo José Anzola held a degree in Industrial Engineering from Andrés Bello Catholic University. He also began the TRIUM Global Executive MBA program which is offered jointly by the New York University Stern School of Business, the London School of Economics and the HEC School of Management, Paris.

== Panagroup Corporation ==
In 1997, Alfredo José Anzola, along with Antonio Mugica and Roger Piñate, began collaborating in a group while working at Panagroup Corporation in Caracas, Venezuela.

== Founding of Smartmatic ==
Smartmatic was officially incorporated on 11 April 2000 in Delaware by Alfredo José Anzola. Smartmatic was then a fledgling technology start-up. Its registered address was the Boca Raton, Florida.

== Financial success ==
In March 2005, with a windfall of some $120 million from its first three contracts with Venezuela, Smartmatic then bought the much larger and more established Sequoia Voting Systems, which by 2006 had voting equipment installed in 17 states and the District of Columbia.

== Death after plane crash ==
On Monday, 28 April 2008, about 14:25 universal coordinated time (UTC), a Piper PA-31-310, N6463L, was destroyed during impact with residences, shortly after takeoff from the Simón Bolívar International Airport, Maiquetía, Venezuela. The certificated airline transport pilot, two passengers, and five people on the ground were fatally injured. The flight was destined for Hato Airport (TNCC), Curaçao, Netherlands Antilles. According to preliminary information from the Junta Investigadora de Accidentes de Aviacion (JIAA) of Venezuela, the pilot reported a loss of engine power after takeoff, and attempted to return to the departure airport. During the return, the airplane impacted several buildings in a residential area, and a post crash fire ensued.

On board the plane were the pilot, Mario Jose Donadi, a convicted drug-trafficker in both the United States and Venezuela; Smartmatic employee Eduardo Ramirez, a lawyer and consultant for the firm, and Alfredo José Anzola. A lawyer of the company, Carolina Caruso, recalled that a Smartmatic shareholders' meeting was to be held that day in Curaçao, where the company was registered. As there were no direct flights that morning, the plane had been hired by the Smartmatic company to make a charter flight to Curaçao.

After the plane crash, the Governor of the State of Miranda, Diosdado Cabello Rondón, arranged for Anzola's transfer from a local hospital to one in Caracas. The Minister of the Interior, Ramón Rodríguez Chacín, also traveled to the Rafael Medina Jiménez Hospital (a.k.a. Periférico de Pariata, state of Vargas) to ascertain Anzola's health. However, Alfredo José Anzola died at an area hospital.
