= Biometric identification by country =

Overview of countries applying biometrics

Biometrics refers to the automated recognition of individuals based on their biological and behavioral characteristics, not to be confused with statistical biometrics; which is used to analyse data in the biological sciences. Biometrics for the purposes of identification may involve DNA matching, facial recognition, fingerprints, retina and iris scanning, voice analysis, handwriting, gait, and even body odor.

There are multiple countries applying biometrics for multiple reasons, from voting to ePassports.

== Africa ==
=== The Gambia ===
The Gambian Biometric Identification System (GAMBIS) allowed for the issuance of The Gambia's first biometric identity documents in July 2009. An individual's data, including their biometric information (thumbprints) is captured in the database. A National Identification Number (NIN), unique to each applicant applying for a card, is issued to the applicant. Biometric documents issued for The Gambia include national identity cards, residential permits, non-Gambian ID cards and driver licenses.

=== Tanzania ===
Tanzania began its biometric voter registration (BVR) system in February 2015 and planned to use it first in a constitutional referendum and subsequent general elections.

== Americas ==
=== Canada ===
Canada has begun research into the use of biometric technology in the area of border security and immigration (Center for Security Sciences), Public Security Technical Program, Biometrics Community of Practice). At least one program, the NEXUS program operated jointly by the Canada Border Services Agency and U.S. Customs and Border Protection, is already operational. It is a functioning example of biometric technology, specifically "iris recognition biometric technology" used for border control and security for air travellers. Canada is also the home for the world's biggest biometric access control company called Bioscrypt Inc.

=== Brazil ===
Since the beginning of the 20th century, Brazilian citizens have had user ID cards. The decision by the Brazilian government to adopt fingerprint-based biometrics was spearheaded by Dr. Felix Pacheco at Rio de Janeiro, at that time capital of the Federative Republic. Dr. Pacheco was a friend of Dr. Juan Vucetich, who invented one of the most complete ten-print classification systems in existence. The Vucetich system was adopted not only in Brazil, but also by most of the other South American countries. The oldest and most traditional ID Institute in Brazil (Instituto de Identificação Félix Pacheco) was integrated at DETRAN (Brazilian equivalent to DMV) into the civil and criminal AFIS system in 1999.

Each state in Brazil is allowed to print its own ID card, but the layout and data are the same for all of them. The ID cards printed in Rio de Janeiro are fully digitized using a 2D bar code with information which can be matched against its owner off-line. The 2D bar code encodes a color photo, a signature, two fingerprints, and other citizen data. This technology was developed in 2000 in order to enhance the safety of the Brazilian ID cards.

By the end of 2005, the Brazilian government started the development of its new passport. The new documents started to be released by the beginning of 2007, in Brasília. The new passport included several security features, like laser perforation, UV hidden symbols, security layer over variable data etc. Brazilian citizens will have their signature, photo, and ten rolled-fingerprints collected during passport requests. All of the data is planned to be stored in ICAO E-passport standard. This allows for contactless electronic reading of the passport content and Citizens ID verification since fingerprint templates and token facial images will be available for automatic recognition.

=== United States ===
Starting in 2005, US passports with facial (image-based) biometric data were scheduled to be produced. Privacy activists in many countries have criticized the technology's use for the potential harm to civil liberties, privacy, and the risk of identity theft. Currently, there is some apprehension in the United States (and the European Union) that the information can be "skimmed" and identify people's citizenship remotely for criminal intent, such as kidnapping.

The US Department of Defense (DoD) Common Access Card, is an ID card issued to all US Service personnel and contractors on US Military sites. This card contains biometric data and digitized photographs. It also has laser-etched photographs and holograms to add security and reduce the risk of falsification. There have been over 10 million of these cards issued.

According to Jim Wayman, director of the National Biometric Test Center at San Jose State University, Walt Disney World is the nation's largest single commercial application of biometrics. However, the US-VISIT program will very soon surpass Walt Disney World for biometrics deployment.

The United States records all fingerprints and a picture of foreign airline passengers visiting the U.S. (exempting Canadians), keeping it in databases for seventy-five years. It is suggested that such information should be shared among the U.S. and other countries that have similar systems. Privacy advocates are worried about data leakage and misuse.

NEXUS is a joint Canada-United States program operated by the Canada Border Services Agency and U.S. Customs and Border Protection. It is designed to expedite travel cross the US-Canada border and makes use of biometric authentication technology, specifically "iris recognition biometric technology". It permits pre-approved members of the program to use self-serve kiosks at airports, reserved lanes at land crossings, or by phoning border officials when entering by water.

As of February 2018, Utah requires applicants for non-REAL ID driver licenses to provide fingerprints, and California and Colorado fingerprint all driver license applicants.

== Asia ==
=== China ===
China started using biometric collection since November 2018 for most foreign citizens as part of the visa application process. A pilot scheme was tested in Shenzhen International Airport prior to the country-wide implementation. The data collected are all the 10 fingers from the hand and a voiceprint. These measures are most likely intended to clamp down on visa loopholes and improve foreign surveillance.

=== India ===
The Government of India funds a number of social welfare schemes focused towards the poor and most vulnerable sections of society. Aadhaar and its platform offers an opportunity to streamline their welfare delivery mechanisms and improve transparency and good governance. In the recent Supreme Court of India verdict Aadhaar has to be mandatorily linked to Permanent Account Number (Tax Identification Number of India)

=== Iraq ===
Biometrics are being used extensively in Iraq to catalogue as many Iraqis as possible providing Iraqis with a verifiable identification card, immune to forgery. During account creation, the collected biometrics information is logged into a central database which then allows a user profile to be created. Even if an Iraqi has lost their ID card, their identification can be found and verified by using their unique biometric information. Additional information can also be added to each account record, such as individual personal history.

=== Israel ===
In 2009, the Knesset (Israeli Parliament) passed the Biometric Database Law, sanctioning the issue of biometric ID cards and passports to all Israeli citizens and the establishment of a mandatory database for storing their bodily information (fingerprints and face templates). In 2013, Israel launched a two-year preliminary pilot study to evaluate and assess the project's feasibility and necessity, in which participation was voluntary. In March 2017, after several postponements resulting from political controversies and technical challenges, Israel's Minister of the Interior ratified the project.

Opponents of the proposed law, including prominent Israeli scientists and security experts, warned that the existence of such a database could damage both civil liberties and state security, because any leaks could be used by criminals or hostile individuals against Israeli residents.

=== Kuwait ===
The competent authorities in the Ministry of Interior in Kuwait began to implement the biometric fingerprint, starting on May 12, 2024

=== Nepal ===
Nepal has already started issuing national identity cards and e-passports with biometrics.

=== South Korea ===
All Korean nationals are required to submit their 10 rotational fingerprints to National Police criminal database regardless of previous criminal record, and their photo and right thumb rotational fingerprint to the Ministry of the Interior and Safety. This process is held when a Korean applies for a mandatory national ID card, Resident Registration Card, at 17. A right thumb rotational fingerprint is printed on the back of the Resident Registration Card, allowing private companies to utilize the fingerprint. The fingerprints saved to the criminal database cannot be opt-out nor deleted even after one's emigration or death. Koreans must submit their fingerprints every time trying to enter Korea unless they use the traditional immigration checkpoints, and the scanned fingerprints are compared with the fingerprints stored in the criminal database. Korean passports do not hold biometrics data, since all citizens' biometrics data are stored in the criminal database.

Non-Korean nationals are required to submit their 2 flat fingerprints and photo. The fingerprints are stored permanently and not deleted even after one's departure from Korea.

Privacy issues regarding biometrics are not-well known in Korea, because the fingerprints are collected when a citizen is a minor, and the police do not inform how the fingerprints will be processed, saved, and used to citizens.

== Europe ==
=== Austria ===
Austria stores biometric photographs of all holders of ID cards and passports, which are Austrian citizens, but does not store collected fingerprints in such cases. It also stores photographs of driver licenses and health insurance cards issued to foreign EU citizens. For foreign citizens subject to visa or residency regimes, photographs and fingerprints are stored. The storage of photographs of its own citizens is in violation of EU regulation 2019/1157, which states, that after 90 days after issuing an ID card, all biometric information should be discarded.

=== France ===
France introduced biometric border control system known as Parafe on 3 August 2007 at some of its Schengen borders. The system allows those enrolled to utilise automated "airlock" barriers to cross the border. French passports issued after June 2009 are pre-enrolled, while European Union, European Economic Area, Swiss passport holders and family member of European Union citizens can enroll at Charles de Gaulle Airport (Terminals 1 and 2E) and Paris Orly airports. The barriers are currently in use at Orly, Charles de Gaulle, Marseille airports and on Eurostar services between London and Paris

=== Germany ===
The biometrics market in Germany experienced enormous growth between the years 2005 and 2009. "The market size will increase from approximately 120 million € (2004) to 377 million €" (2009). "The federal government will be a major contributor to this development". In particular, the biometric procedures of fingerprint and facial recognition can profit from the government project. In May 2005 the German Upper House of Parliament approved the implementation of the ePass, a passport issued to all German citizens which contain biometric technology. The ePass has been in circulation since November 2005, and contains a chip that holds a digital photograph and one fingerprint from each hand, usually of the index fingers, though others may be used if these fingers are missing or have extremely distorted prints. "A third biometric identifier – iris scans – could be added at a later stage". An increase in the prevalence of biometric technology in Germany is an effort to not only keep citizens safe within German borders but also to comply with the current US deadline for visa-waiver countries to introduce biometric passports. In addition to producing biometric passports for German citizens, the German government has put in place new requirements for visitors to apply for visas within the country. "Only applicants for long-term visas, which allow more than three months' residence, will be affected by the planned biometric registration program. The new work visas will also include fingerprinting, iris scanning, and digital photos".

Germany is also one of the first countries to implement biometric technology at the Olympic Games to protect German athletes. "The Olympic Games is always a diplomatically tense affair and previous events have been rocked by terrorist attacks—most notably when Germany last held the Games in Munich in 1972 and 11 Israeli athletes were killed".

Biometric technology was first used at the Olympic Summer Games in Athens, Greece in 2004. "On registering with the scheme, accredited visitors will receive an ID card containing their fingerprint biometrics data that will enable them to access the 'German House'. Accredited visitors will include athletes, coaching staff, team management and members of the media".

As a protest against the increasing use of biometric data, the influential hacker group Chaos Computer Club published a fingerprint of German Minister of the Interior Wolfgang Schäuble in the March 2008 edition of its magazine Datenschleuder. The magazine also included the fingerprint on a film that readers could use to fool fingerprint readers.

=== Italy ===
Since 2013, Italy has deployed a number of ePassport gates at major Italian airports allowing EU, EEA and Swiss citizens with a biometric passport to cross the Schengen border in a totally automated way.

Italy has standardized protocols in use by police forces.

=== Netherlands ===
Starting 21 September 2009, all new Dutch passports and ID cards must include the holder's fingerprints. Since 26 August 2006, Dutch passports have included an electronic chip containing the personal details of the holder and a digitised passport photograph. The chip holds following data: your name (first name(s) and surname); the document number; your nationality, date of birth and sex; the expiry date; the country of issue; and your personal ID number (Burgerservicenummer (BSN)).

==== Recent requirements for passport photos ====
Since 28 August 2006, under EU regulation '2252/2004' all EU member states have been obliged to include a digital image of the holder's passport photo.

=== Norway ===
The introduction of biometric passports to Norway began in 2005 and supplied by Setec, a Gemplus International company. The chips used in Norway employ security features recommended by the International Civil Aviation Organization (ICAO) although security and privacy concerns from civil liberties groups remain.

In 2007 the Norwegian government launched a ‘multi-modal’ biometric enrolment system supplied by Motorola. Motorola's new system enabled multiple public agencies to digitally capture and store fingerprints, 2D facial images and signatures for passports and visas.

Steria and IDEX ASA are two of the leading biometrics software and product manufacturers in Norway.

=== Ukraine ===
A bill on biometric passports was approved by the Ukrainian Parliament on February 15, 2012. These passports are to be used for foreign travel only. Internal passports so far don't have biometric information. An updated version of the law was passed by the Verkhovna Rada of Ukraine on November 20, 2012, taking into account proposals made by the president, and was subsequently signed by the president. The new biometric passports are one of the conditions placed on Ukraine by the European Union on the path to easing its visa requirements and eventually moving towards a visa-free regime with the EU. These national ID cards will be valid for 10 years and issued at the age of 14, instead of at the age of 16, as previous Ukrainian passports were. Verkhovna Rada Commissioner for Human Rights, Valeriya Lutkovska, had criticized the law as it “does not comply with the Constitution of Ukraine and European standards in the sphere of personal data protection, and might infringe on human rights and freedom.” The law was also criticized by Oleksandr Hladun from the Institute for Demography and Social Studies of Ukraine. He said the adoption such a law on a unified demographic register threatens “to create a police state” in Ukraine, where any information can be collected about any person and used without the person's knowledge.

According to the new law, each Ukrainian citizen, regardless of his or her age, is obliged to obtain such a passport. The previous version of the Ukrainian passports will remain valid until their official expiration dates.

Ukraine's law on biometric passports came into force on December 6, 2012. The document foresees the introduction of electronic passports containing electronic chips with biometric information for traveling abroad, according to the standards of the International Civil Aviation Organization (ICAO). According to the law, the passports of Ukrainian citizens will be produced in the form of cards with contactless smart chips and issued no later than 30 calendar days from the date of the submission of a relevant application. The electronic passports will include the name of the state, the name of the document, the full name of the holder, the holder's sex, citizenship, date of birth, and a unique number in the register, the number of the document, the document's date of expiration, the date of issue of the document, the name of the agency that issued the document, the place of birth, a photo and the signature of the holder. Information about the parents or the guardian of the holder may be included to the document upon a relevant written request. At the president's request, a new provision has been included in the law that says that people who refuse to enter their personal information in an electronic chip due to their religious beliefs have the right to refuse to use this document or the insertion of such information into the chip.

The United Nations High Commissioner for Refugees has suggested that the new law does not fully comply with international standards.

=== United Kingdom ===
The United Kingdom utilises biometrics in its ePassport gates. To be eligible to use the eGates, one must be a British citizen, a national of an EEA country, Australia, Canada, Japan, New Zealand, Norway, Singapore, South Korea, Switzerland or the USA, or a member of the registered traveller scheme, as well as being at least 18, or 12 if accompanied by an adult. Passport officers remain in place at all eGates gates in case a passport cannot be read or a traveller requires further screening.

Fingerprint scanners have been used in some schools to facilitate the subtraction of funds from an account financed by parents for the payment of school dinners. By using such a system, nutritional reports can be produced for parents to survey a child's intake. This has raised questions from liberty groups, which claim that the system removes freedom of choice from young people. Other concerns arise from the possibility of data leaking from the providers of school meals to interest groups that provide health services, such as the NHS and insurance groups, which may have a detrimental effect on the ability of individuals to enjoy equality of access to services.

== Oceania ==
=== Australia ===
Visitors intending to visit Australia and returning Australian residents with an ePassport may have to submit to biometric authentication as part of the Smartgate system, linking individuals to their visas and passports. Biometric data are collected from some visa applicants by Immigration particularly in cases of Refugee or Humanitarian Visas.

Australia introduced guidance on biometrics and privacy in 2006, which was developed by the Biometrics Institute. The Biometrics Institute is a self-funded membership organisation that now operates at a global level providing thought leadership, information and an impartial platform for trusted and balanced discussions on biometrics.

=== New Zealand ===
SmartGate was launched by the New Zealand government at Auckland International Airport on Thursday 3 December 2009. The program is available at Auckland, Wellington and Christchurch international airports for arriving travellers, and also for travellers departing from Auckland (with plans to extend the program for departures from Wellington and Christchurch by mid-2011).

The kiosk and gate system will allow all New Zealand and Australian electronic passport holders over 18 to clear passport control without needing to have their identity checked by a Customs officer. The system uses "advanced facial software" which "compares your face with the digital copy of your photo in your ePassport chip".

Deputy comptroller of customs John Secker said SmartGate represented probably the biggest single development in border processing in New Zealand in the past two decades. People will have a choice whether they want to use the system or go through normal passport control.

== Countries with biometric voter registration ==
The number of countries adopting biometrics for voting registration or voting authentication has steadily increased. As of 2016, half of the countries in Africa and Latin America use this technology in elections. According to the International Institute for Democracy and Electoral Assistance’s ICTs in Elections Database, 35 per cent of over 130 surveyed electoral commissions is capturing biometric data (such as fingerprints or photos) as part of their voter registration process.

== See also ==
- CCTV camera
- National biometric ID card
