= American Thinker =

American conservative online political magazine

- Website type: News, commentary
- Available in: English
- Founded: March 2003; 23 years ago
- Headquarters: El Cerrito, California, United States
- Founders: Ed Lasky, Richard Baehr, Thomas Lifson
- Website: americanthinker.com
- Launched: November 2003
- Current status: Active

American Thinker is a daily online magazine dealing with American politics from a politically conservative viewpoint. It was founded in 2003 by attorney Ed Lasky, health-care consultant Richard Baehr, and sociologist Thomas Lifson, and initially became prominent in the lead-up to the 2008 U.S. presidential election for its attacks on then-candidate Barack Obama. The magazine has been described as a conservative blog, but often features notable conservative authors such as Jerome Corsi. The Southern Poverty Law Center has called the site "a not so thoughtful far-right online publication".

In the aftermath of Donald Trump's loss in the 2020 U.S. presidential election, American Thinker published a variety of articles that had claims of election fraud. Faced with a lawsuit from Dominion Voting Systems, Lifson acknowledged that the site had relied upon "discredited sources who have peddled debunked theories". American Thinker likewise admitted that its election claims were "completely false and have no basis in fact" and that "it was wrong for us to publish these false statements."

== Coverage ==
In 2009, in the wake of the election of Barack Obama, American Thinker joined a wave of conservative media publications discussing the possibility of a second Civil War. They forecast the possibility of "several regional republics" emerging following the "overbearing, oppressive leviathan" of Obama's presidency.

A 2008 column in American Thinker drew attention to a California plan to require programmable thermostats that could be controlled by officials in the event of power-supply difficulties. According to The New York Times, the column was "by turns populist..., free-market..., and civil libertarian".

In 2015 American Thinker published a blog post saying rainbow-colored Doritos were a "gateway snack to introduce children to the joys of homosexuality". The site has also been described as sympathetic to the counter-jihad movement, having published writers such as Pamela Geller, Robert Spencer and Paul Weston.

In a 2020 blog post on the site, Thomas Lifson referenced a paper published in Geophysical Research Letters to claim that sea level rise has been slow and constant, and that this rise pre-dated industrialization. This claim went viral over social media in March 2020. The author of the paper describes this interpretation as factually incorrect, constituting climate misinformation.

Under threat of litigation, in January 2021 American Thinker published a retraction of unsupported stories it published asserting that Dominion Voting Systems engaged in a conspiracy to rig the 2020 presidential election against President Donald Trump, acknowledging, "These statements are completely false and have no basis in fact."

In late 2024 and early 2025, a series of American Thinker articles by Jim Davis explored "the biggest scandal of all time": what he described as a confluence of "(a) the cover-up of Joe Biden’s decline; (b) lawfare against Trump; (c) the cover-up of Hunter Biden’s influence-peddling; and now (d) billions wasted, by not just the U.S. Agency for International Development (USAID), but also by many other agencies, and being uncovered by Elon Musk’s DOGE." In May 2025, Trump confronted South African President Ramaphosa with claims of "White Genocide" being carried out under his government's oversight. Among other things he showed a printout from an article in The American Thinker although that article was not saying that the picture was from South Africa.
