= Darwin Technologies =

Darwin Technologies Ltd.
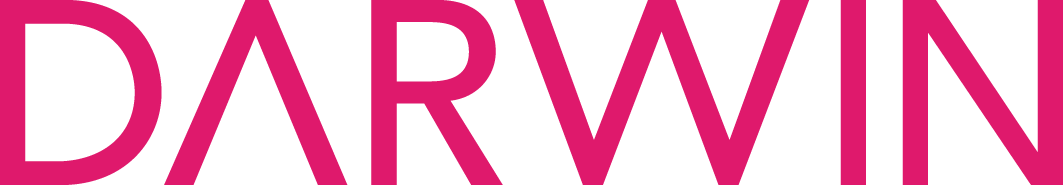
- Company type: Private company
- Industry: Software
- Founded: 2000
- Founder: Michael Whitfield, Co-Founder Chris Bruce, Co-Founder
- Headquarters: London, England, UK
- Products: Darwin
- Parent: Mercer
- Website: darwin.com

Darwin Technologies Ltd., known simply as Darwin (formerly Thomsons Online Benefits) is a global benefits management and employee engagement software company that also provides consultancy services related to reward, workplace pensions and employee benefit programmes. With offices in London, Singapore and Cluj, Romania, the firm employs over 700 staff.

== History ==
Darwin was founded in 2000 and was subject to a venture capital backed management buyout in 2004 funded by Pi Capital. Darwin ranked 4th in the Sunday Times BDO Track 100 for 2014 (5th in 2014). It was ranked 86th in the Sunday Times Tech Track 100 listing for 2011 (81st 2010, 72nd 2009, 44th 2008, 54th 2007, 32nd 2006), a sister listing to the Sunday Times Fast Track 100 for Britain's fastest growing unquoted technology companies, and obtained a listing in the EMEA Deloitte Fast 500 in 2007 and 2009. In 2013, the firm was ranked 112th in the Sunday Times HSBC International Track 200 league table.

In January 2013 the US private equity firm ABRY Partners took a majority stake in the company, valuing the company at "close to £100m".

In December 2016, the consulting firm Mercer acquired Darwin (formerly Thomsons Online Benefits), which now operates as a wholly owned subsidiary.

In November 2020, Darwin changed company name from Thomsons Online Benefits to Darwin Technologies Ltd.

== Operations ==
Darwin provides on-demand employee benefits management software for its clients, with over 3m users, from companies including Microsoft, Cisco, Samsung, City and Guilds and NCR Corporation. Their main software Darwin is deployed in 43 languages and in over 100 countries.
