= David Giampaolo =

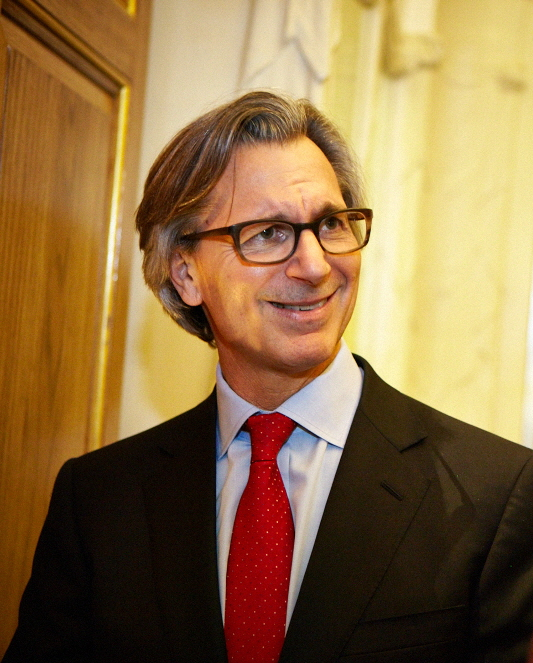
- Giampaolo in 2013
- Born: 1958 (age 67–68); Miami, Florida, U.S.
- Occupations: Chief executive of Pi Capital and director of private companies
- Known for: Pi Capital, Fitness First

David Anthony Giampaolo (born 1958) is the chief executive of Pi Capital, a London-based investor club. He is also a noted entrepreneur in the global health and fitness sector. He has been described as "London's most networked man" by The Times and other newspapers. He has co-founded or served on the board of several large businesses, including Fitness First, 24 Hour Fitness, Zumba and GlobalFit. He is a trustee of Speakers4Schools and a board member of UK technology firm Smartmatic.

In 2007, The Daily Telegraph listed him as one of the most influential Americans living in the UK. GQ Magazine placed him 6th on its list of the 100 Most Connected Men in Britain 2015. In 2016 he was made a member of The Maserati 100, a list of successful philanthropists and investors who work in support of new business talent, compiled by Maserati and The Centre for Entrepreneurs.

== Early life and career ==
Born in Miami, Florida, Giampaolo spent his childhood in the city of Hollywood, FL. His father held several jobs simultaneously, including journalist, jazz musician and racetrack announcer. Giampaolo attended Cooper City High School, dropping out at age 16. He credits his decision to become an entrepreneur to his Italian immigrant family's work ethic, particularly that of his father.

Aged 15 Giampaolo started a lawn-cutting business in his local neighbourhood, a business which grew to employing two of his friends. He then took up weight training, becoming an instructor at his local gym. At 17, he sold his lawn-cutting business for $3,000, a sum which he used to set up a small gym aimed at fitness enthusiasts. His clients there included a trio of wealthy doctors whose medical practice was nearby.

In an interview with Moneyweek, Giampaolo recounted: "One doctor said: "This place is a dump, it's so hot. Why don't you move to bigger premises?" And I said, flippantly, "Give me the money and I'll do it". And he said 'you're on'." Over the next two years the trio backed Giampaolo in opening up two health clubs, investing $50,000 to capitalise on the then-new trend for Nautilus fitness machines.

== Fitness clubs ==
In 1984, having sold his first three gyms, Giampaolo joined health club chain Chicago Health Clubs, then-owned by Bally Fitness. In 1987 Bally selected Giampaolo to set up and lead its business in the UK, beginning with The Barbican Health and Fitness Centre. In 1988 Giampaolo wrote to Diana, Princess of Wales with an invitation to perform the Barbican club's opening ceremony. She agreed, and the resulting press coverage helped to establish Barbican as Britain's first upmarket health venue.

Giampaolo left Barbican Health and Fitness in 1989 and raised £3m to found Espree Leisure, which subsequently developed two health clubs in London. In 1991 Giampaolo set up Forza, a European exercise equipment distributor for several fitness brands, including Reebok and Cybex. In 1998 he and Mark Mastrov co-founded Fitness Holdings Europe, a private-equity-backed investment vehicle, to open and acquire small chains of European health clubs. Fitness Holdings Europe was merged into the 24 Hour Fitness Worldwide, Inc. in 2000. Giampaolo left 24-Hour Fitness in 2001 to begin work on a management buy-in of investor club Pi Capital, which completed in 2002.

== Pi Capital ==
Giampaolo is a major shareholder and chief executive of Pi Capital.

Pi's membership includes entrepreneurs and chairman/CEOs from the business community in the UK and from around the globe. Andrew Davidson, writing in The Sunday Times, describes Pi's membership as "... drawn from the business elite of Britain, [pooling] money and know-how to back fledgling firms." Giampaolo and a team of in-house advisors filter investments before circulating them among members. Giampaolo claims 300 members for Pi. He and his partners co-invest on the same terms and on a peer-opt-in basis. Pi also invests in funds that are closed or invite-only, or have financial entry requirements beyond those of individual Pi members. Pi has co-invested with Apax, BC Partners, Cinven and Alchemy Partners. In 2013 Pi Capital's investment in Thomsons Online Benefits was replaced by ABRY Partners in a deal which valued Thomsons at around £100m.

Giampaolo is reported as saying that wealthy investors are "…sceptical of relying on third parties to invest their capital. They don't want to be shown a product which a bank has created, and to which large fees are usually attached whether the investment does well or not." He describes Pi as a "...conservative investor".

The Independent reported in 2007 that Pi members have invested over £150m since Giampaolo's buy-out. Under Giampaolo the club has refocused to become more like a salon, arranging monthly events with speakers on intellectual as well as financial topics. Previous speakers include Bill Clinton, Kofi Annan, Sir Martin Sorrell, CEO of WPP, Gillian Tett, Michael Lewis, Garry Kasparov and Dominic Barton, global MD of McKinsey. Giampaolo commented to the Financial Times in September 2012: "Intellectual capital is the focus." The article drew parallels between Pi Capital's events and those of non-financial salons in London, such the 14-10 club, Intelligence Squared and the 5x15 talk series.

Pi Club has also begun participating in philanthropic initiatives under Giampaolo's leadership.

== Business philosophy ==
The Financial Times quotes Giampaolo as believing that entrepreneurs should not hide behind a persona of success, but embrace their failures instead: "The best entrepreneurs talk about failure with pride and guts."

Giampaolo has invested in a personal capacity into various startups, including OneDome, a UK-based property technology firm.

== Current appointments ==
Giampaolo is currently on the Board of Directors of Zumba Fitness and election technology group SGO, the parent company to Smartmatic. SGO is chaired by Mark, Lord Malloch Brown. He is also an investor in the business lending platform Growth Street.

In 2019 he became a joint investor in the yoga and wellness start-up Sarva, alongside Jennifer Lopez and Alex Rodriguez. He is also a non-executive director of Agronomics Ltd, an AIM-listed alternative food company.

He is a senior advisor to the private equity firm BC Partners and to AMG Partners (Affiliated Managers Group, Inc.), a global asset management company.

He is also a member of the Global Partners Council at the Institute of New Economic Thinking (INET). Founded by James Balsillie, William Janeway and George Soros, INET is a nonpartisan, nonprofit organization working in promotion of new economic theories to address social issues such as wealth inequality and environmental sustainability.

Giampaolo is an ambassador for the Aurora Forum, a thought-leadership programme in support of social, scientific, technological, educational, and humanitarian innovation, hosted in Armenia. He is also a board member of The Coalition of Inclusive Capitalism.

== Personal life ==
Giampaolo has lived in the UK since 1987. He is a member of the World Presidents' Organisation (WPO) and of The Chief Executives Organisation, an independent graduate organisation of Young Presidents' Organization. Giampaolo is also a former board member of the International Health, Racquet & Sportsclub Association. He is also a Trustee of Speakers4Schools.

He lists Bill Clinton, David Petraeus, Colin Powell and his father as his biggest personal influences. His hobbies are fitness, wine and travel.

In May 2013, Giampaolo became patron of Pro Bono Economics, the not-for-profit organisation which matches volunteer economists with charities.
