= KnowInk =

American electronic pollbook manufacturer

KnowInk (sometimes stylized as KNOWiNK or Knowink) is an electronic pollbook manufacturer based in St. Louis, Missouri. Its main product is the Poll Pad, an iPad-based device to help poll workers check in eligible voters.

== History ==
KnowInk was founded in 2011 by Scott Leiendecker. He was the Republican director of the St. Louis City Board of Elections until 2012, having first been appointed by Missouri Secretary of State Matt Blunt to investigate election policy in St. Louis after the 2000 election, and also working alongside Ed Martin when the latter was the chair of the St. Louis City Board of Elections. Leiendecker was inspired to found KnowInk after overseeing an election in Kosovo, desiring to make voting registration easier for voters and election workers. Leiendecker self-funded the company with about $50,000 in savings, starting with three employees. They worked with local contractors to build a service, and signed deals with 15 Missouri counties by 2012, making a profit by that year. In 2013, KnowInk won a $50,000 award from Arch Grants.

In 2016, KnowInk acquired another e-pollbook company that was also based in Missouri, Election Administrators. 20,000 of their Poll Pad tablets were used during the 2016 United States presidential election. By 2019, they had $53.7 million in revenue. By 2020, KnowInk provided the most e-pollbooks in the United States. They, along with Election Systems & Software, had the most market share for e-pollbooks.

In November 2020, Hermann Cos., a private equity firm based in Clayton, Missouri, reportedly invested over $10 million in KnowInk, with the company intending to use that funding for future acquisitions. In February 2021, KnowInk acquired BPro, an election software company based in South Dakota.

In 2023, Steele Shippy, a former campaign manager for Mike Parson, joined KnowInk as its chief growth officer. As of that year, Leiendecker was the CEO and KnowInk had 154 employees.

According to the company, KnowInk handled 36 million voter check-ins during the 2024 United States presidential election. In March 2025, KnowInk was the first company in the United States to receive e-pollbook certification from the U.S. Election Assistance Commission.

== Products ==
Poll Pad is an digital platform for checking in voters and verifying their eligibility, intended as a replacement for paper-based pollbooks. KnowInk has released Poll Print, which is also used for checking in voters and printing ballots; and TotalVote, which is intended for a variety of election tasks.

== Geographic coverage ==
By 2023, KnowInk's services were used by over 1,700 voting jurisdictions in 36 states across the United States. As of 2025, the largest of these jurisdictions were Los Angeles County and New York City.

== Controversies ==
KnowInk pollbooks have caused widespread issues in Georgia during local elections in 2019 and the presidential primary elections in 2020, as well as a test election in Philadelphia in 2019. Issues also occurred with KnowInk e-pollbooks during the 2020 presidential primary elections in Los Angeles County, as well as during the 2020 United States presidential election in Georgia, Ohio and Texas. In several of these cases, faulty e-pollbooks have led to long wait times for voters.

In April 2025, Ohio Secretary of State Frank LaRose ordered the boards of elections of an unspecified number of counties to switch to paper pollbooks from electronic ones due to an unspecified security vulnerability in a single KnowInk pollbook. WSYX noted that at least 10 local county boards of elections switched to paper.
