= Association of Electoral Administrators =

The Association of Electoral Administrators (AEA) is the main British organisation for local administrators (at councils) of elections, and is headquartered in Staffordshire.

== History ==
The organisation was formed at a meeting in Wast Hills, in the west of Birmingham, in July 1987. Previously there had been no coordination between electoral officers at a national level. The first general meeting was held in February 1988 in Devon.

== Function ==
It represents local electoral registration officers.

== Structure ==
It is headquartered in the south of Cannock, near the A34.

== See also ==
- Electoral Commission (United Kingdom)
