= Nigel Knowles =

English law co-chairman

Sir Nigel Knowles is the former global co-chairman of the law firm DLA Piper and since 2017 newly appointed Chairman of DWF LLP. He is also Chairman of OneDome, a fast growing fintech business based in the UK.

He was also appointed as the Chairman of recruitment firm Brewster Partners before resigning on 25 November 2021 following allegations of furlough fraud made by whistle blowers and reported by The Times newspaper and the BBC.

== Life ==
He was educated at the University of Sheffield, where he studied law, and joined Broomhead & Neals as an articled clerk in 1978.

In 1996 he was appointed as managing partner of what was then Dibb Lupton Broomhead. In 2005 he became joint chief executive officer of DLA Piper following a three-way merger between DLA and U.S. law firms Piper Rudnick and Gray Cary Ware & Freidenrich LLP. He was knighted in March 2009.

In 2016 he was picked to serve as High Sheriff of Greater London for one year, and joined the advisory board for the legal communication platform, The Link App.

Sir Nigel is also the current Chairman of the Sheffield City Region Local Enterprise Partnership, a role that works with the private and public sector within the Sheffield City Region to drive economic growth across the nine local council areas that comprise the Sheffield City Region. Sir Nigel is also the current Chairman of [BioSURE]a company which manufactures COVID-19 lateral flow tests. He works closely with the BioSure team to set the strategy and direction, and advises on how best to scale up the business internationally quickly and effectively.
