= Electronic pollbook =

Digital register of voters

An electronic pollbook, also known as an e-pollbook, is typically either hardware, software or a combination of the two that allows election officials to review and/or maintain voter register information for an election, but does not actually count votes. This software or hardware is used in place of paper-based pollbooks, which are typically three-ring binders. Often, the functions of an e-pollbook include voter lookup, verification, identification, precinct assignment, ballot assignment, voter history update and other functions such as name change, address change and/or redirecting voters to correct voting location.

When voters have a choice of multiple vote centers where they may vote, e-pollbooks communicating over the internet can prevent a voter from voting more than once.

Where e-pollbooks are deployed, they have consolidated broad data (from entire city, county and/or federated state) into usable information at a polling place and have replaced a paper-based system or complemented the paper processes. This consolidation has replaced or supplemented a manual process, usually a telephone call, from a precinct back to the local or regional board of elections. Normally, the information handled by an e-pollbook is public information that can be found in public or online.

More jurisdictions are adopting electronic pollbooks in place of paper-based pollbooks. For example, in January 2014, the City of Chicago reached an agreement with Election Systems & Software to provide more than 2,100 ExpressPoll voter check-in and verification devices to support the city's 1.6 million registered voters. The e-pollbook system was first used in Chicago's 2014 primary elections.

As of 2020, KnowInk and Election Systems & Software had the most market share for e-pollbooks in the United States.

== Issues ==
In 2023 a contractor, WSD Digital, developing a voter registration and e-pollbook system for New Hampshire put in code to link to websites in Russia and used open source software managed by a Russian. New Hampshire found those issues by hiring another company, ReversingLabs, to review the code of the first company.

In 2020 Williamson County TX found two problems: that its use of e-pollbooks sometimes assigned the wrong ballot style to voters, so they voted on contests outside their area, not voting on contests in their own areas, and that some ballots did not display the voters' precincts.

In 2006, at least two vendors had problems with e-pollbooks, including Diebold in Maryland in September 2006, and Sequoia Voting Systems in Denver, Colorado in November 2006.
