= Bolívar Municipality, Sucre =

Bolívar Municipality Municipio Bolívar
- Municipality
- Seal

- Location in Sucre

- Location in Venezuela
- Coordinates: 10°22′12″N 63°57′54″W
- Country: Venezuela
- State: Sucre

Government
  - Mayor: Héctor Frontado

Area
  - Total: 211 km^{2} (81 sq mi)

Population (2011)
  - Total: 25,312
  - Density: 120/km^{2} (311/sq mi)
- Time zone: UTC−4 (VET)
- Website: Official website

Bolívar is a municipality of Sucre, Venezuela. The capital is Marigüitar. It was founded in 1713 after many years of missionary work taking place in the area.

== Name ==
The municipality is one of several in Venezuela named "Bolívar Municipality" in honor of Venezuelan independence hero Simón Bolívar.

== Geography ==
The municipality lies about 12 meters above sea level, with its northern border on the Gulf of Cariaco. The Marigüitar River runs through the municipality into the gulf. Besides the capital, the municipality has seven main population centers: Guaracayar, Güirintar-Carenero, La Soledad, Sotillo, La chica, Golindano, and Petare. It is accessible by trunk road 09 that runs west-east from Cumaná to San Antonio del Golfo, and by sea from the gulf.

Despite bordering the coast, in 2019 the municipality began to suffer from severe water shortages. There have been infrastructure works since 2000 to improve the safe water flow in the municipality, works which have seen over 15,000 laborers from the local community and which have been largely funded by local export companies.

== Economy ==
The economy of this municipality is based primarily in fishing, but there is also some tourism. Combining both, the municipality also engages in promoting aquatourism.

Based in Marigüitar, are several large fish and seafood packaging companies.

The municipality has some hotel complexes and native cultural food outlets, for the national and international tourists that come because of its beaches and landscapes. There are also about 10 pharmacies in the municipality, which began selling suncream for tourists as well as providing medicines for the locals.

== Government ==
The municipality is governed by a mayor and a council, all of whom are elected and are affiliated with a national party. The current mayor is Héctor Frontado, who was previously the mayor of neighboring municipality Mejía from 2013-17. In 2017, Cabeza was arrested and later sentenced for a corruption scheme in which his used his office as mayor to illegally obtain expensive goods.

=== Mayors ===
| Period | Mayor | Political affiliation | % of votes | Notes |
|---|---|---|---|---|
| 1989-92 | Manuel Neptalí Yendiz | AD | - | First directly elected mayor |
| 1992-95 | Manuel Neptalí Yendiz | AD | - | Reelected |
| 1995-2000 | Hector García | COPEI | - | Second directly elected mayor (next election was held early in 2000 due to the approval of the 1999 constitution) |
| 2000-04 | Hector García | IPCN COPEI | 41.54 | Reelected |
| 2004-08 | Hector García | PODEMOS | 52.59 | Reelected |
| 2008-13 | Carmen Villegas | PSUV | 46.39 | Third directly elected mayor (the municipal elections scheduled for the end of 2012 were postponed by a year) |
| 2013-17 | Luis Daniel Cabeza | VP MUD | 55.82 | Fourth directly elected mayor |
| 2017–present | Héctor Frontado | PSUV | Won 6809 votes | Fifth directly elected mayor |

== See also ==
- Bolívar Municipality (disambiguation)
