= Paria Peninsula =

Peninsula in Venezuela

Coordinates: 10.7°N 62.5°W

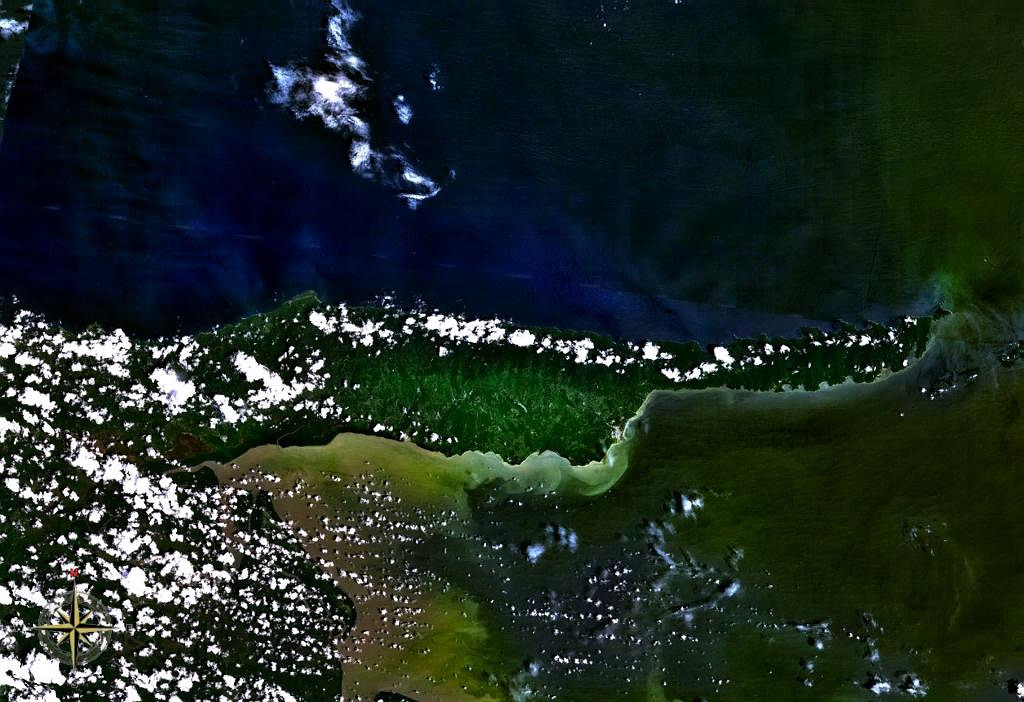
Satellite photo of the Paria Peninsula, between the Caribbean Sea (above/north) and Gulf of Paria (below/south).

The Paria Peninsula is part of eastern Sucre State (red) in northeastern Venezuela.

The Paria Peninsula (Spanish: Península de Paria) is a large peninsula on the Caribbean Sea, in the state of Sucre in northern Venezuela.

== Geography ==
Separating the Caribbean Sea from the Gulf of Paria, the peninsula is part of the Serranía del Litoral mountain range, in the Venezuelan Coastal Range portion of the northern Andes. Punta Peñas, its tip, is within sight of the naked eye from the island of Trinidad.

National Park

Península de Paria National Park protects a section of the peninsula.

== Flora and fauna ==
The Scissor-tailed hummingbird is an endangered hummingbird found only on the Paria Peninsula. It primarily inhabits the interior of damp mature subtropical forest and cloudforest, and is also found at forest edges and in small clearings. In elevation it ranges from 500 to 1,200 m (1,600 to 3,900 ft).

== Municipalities ==
As a political subdivision, the Paria Region of the Paria Peninsula is the aggregation of six municipalities within Sucre State:

- Bermúdez Municipality – (capital: Carúpano)
- Arismendi Municipality – (capital: Río Caribe)
- Benítez Municipality – (capital: El Pilar)
- Libertador Municipality – (capital: Tunapuy)
- Mariño Municipality – (capital: Irapa)
- Valdez Municipality – (capital: Güiria)

== See also ==
- Gulf of Paria topics
- Venezuelan Coastal Range topics
