= Punta Peñas =

Cape of Paria Peninsula, Venezuela

Coordinates: 10.734°N 61.848°W

Punta Peñas is a cape in Venezuela, specifically in the state of Sucre, that is the extremity of Paria Peninsula. Punta Peñas comes extremely close to the island of Trinidad, the largest island of the nation of Trinidad and Tobago. It is part of the Caribbean Coast of Venezuela.

== See also ==
- Geography of Venezuela
- Geography of South America
