= San José de Aerocuar =

- Location within Venezuela
- Coordinates: 10.6027°N 63.3273°W
- Country: Venezuela
- State: Sucre
- Time zone: UTC-4:30 (VST)
  - Summer (DST): UTC-4:30 (not observed)

San José de Aerocuar is a town in the state of Sucre, Venezuela. It is the capital of the Andrés Mata Municipality.
