= El Pilar, Venezuela =

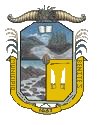
- Coat of arms

- Location within Venezuela
- Coordinates: 10.5496°N 63.1552°W
- Country: Venezuela
- State: Sucre
- Time zone: UTC-4:30 (VST)
  - Summer (DST): UTC-4:30 (not observed)

El Pilar is a town in the state of Sucre, Venezuela. It is the capital of the Benítez Municipality.
