= Cajigal Municipality =

Venezuelan municipality

Cajigal Municipality Municipio Cajigal
- Municipality
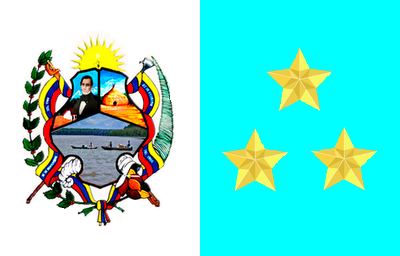
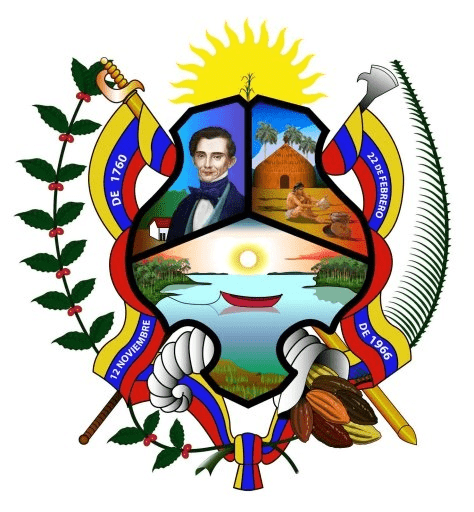
- Flag Coat of arms

- Location in Sucre

- Location in Venezuela
- Coordinates: 10°34′11″N 62°49′45″W
- Country: Venezuela
- State: Sucre

Area
  - Total: 365 km^{2} (141 sq mi)
- Time zone: UTC−4 (VET)
- Website: Official website

Cajigal is a municipality of Sucre, Venezuela. The capital is Yaguaraparo. As of 2015, Cajigal had a population of 25,225.
