= Manzanares River (South America) =

River in Venezuela

Manzanares
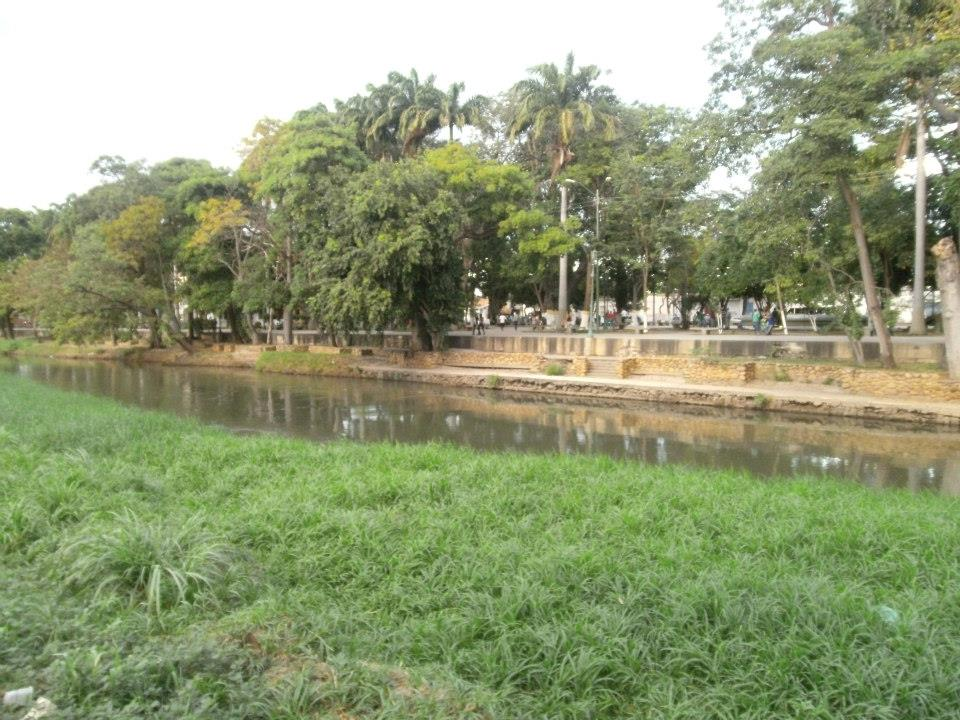
- View of the Manzanares River

- Location of mouth

Location
- Country: Venezuela

Physical characteristics
- Source
  - location: Turimiquire Range
  - elevation: ca 2,000 m (6,600 ft)
- Mouth
  - location: Cariaco Gulf, Caribbean
  - coordinates: 10°27′N 64°10′W
  - elevation: 0 m (0 ft)
- Length: 80 km (50 mi)
- Basin size: 1,066 km^{2} (412 sq mi)
- Discharge
  - average: 17.48 m^{3}/s (617 cu ft/s)

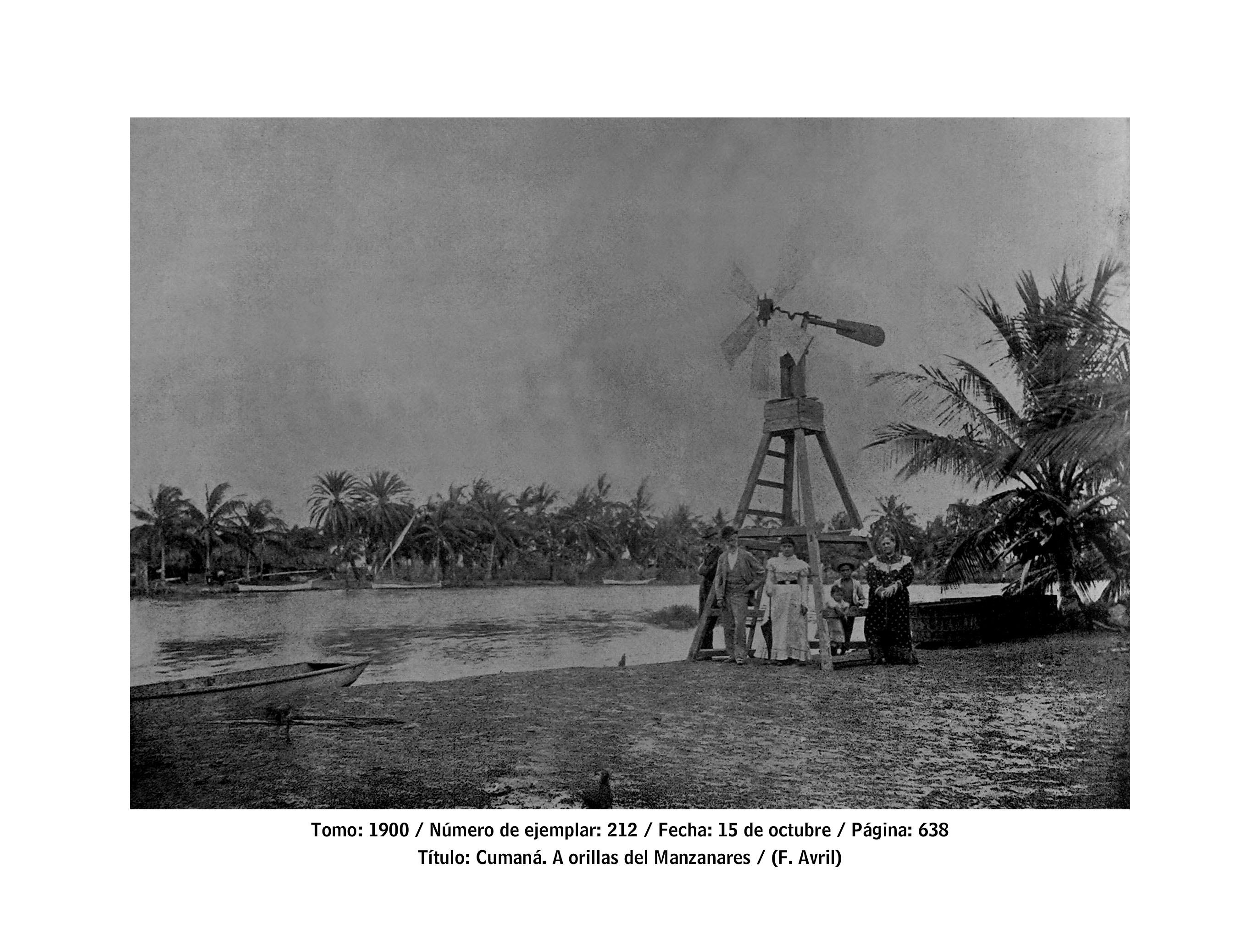
By the shores of the Manzanares in 1900

The Manzanares is an 80 km long river in Venezuela. It flows into the Caribbean Sea.

== Course ==
The source of the Manzanares is at the 2,200 metres (7,200 ft) high Turimiquire Range in Sucre State. The river flows roughly northwards for about 80 km (50 mi) by Cumanacoa. Finally it flows by City of Cumaná into the Cariaco Gulf of the Caribbean.

== History ==
Historically this river had also been known as the 'Cumaná River', for it has an iconic value in the city of Cumaná.

Alexander von Humboldt, who visited Cumaná in 1799, praised the pleasant atmosphere of the river banks in his travelogue Personal Narrative of a Journey to the Equinoctial Regions of the New Continent (1814–29)

In 2012, Hurricane Isaac caused heavy rain in the area and the Manzanares overflowed its banks in the town of Cumanacoa inundating approximately 1,200 homes many of which were damaged and a few destroyed. Some residents had to be airlifted to safety. Similar flooding occurred elsewhere in the country, such as in Caracas where 40 families had to be evacuated.

This river is the subject of Rio Manzanares, a famous Parang song composed by José Antonio López in Cumaná in 1958.

== See also ==
- List of rivers of Venezuela
- Parang
