= Marigüitar =

- Location within Venezuela
- Coordinates: 10°27′N 63°54′W
- Country: Venezuela
- State: Sucre
- Time zone: UTC-4:30 (VST)
  - Summer (DST): UTC-4:30 (not observed)

Marigüitar is a small coastal town in the state of Sucre, Venezuela. It lies on the southern coast of the Gulf of Cariaco, across from the Araya Peninsula. The nearest city is Cumaná, about 20 kilometers to the east. The narrow, winding road that connects Cumaná and Carúpano passes through the town. Marigüitar has a large fish-processing plant owned by Mavesa, which is a subsidiary of Empresas Polar, the largest food and drink company in Venezuela. The fish processing plant serves as the principal source of employment for the town's residents. A small fleet of buses, pick-up trucks, and privately owned cars provide transportation from the town to the surrounding communities and to Cumaná.

== History ==
The town has an archeological site which revealed both the presence of native and colonial pottery. This suggests that the area was both active during the Era of Colonization and prior to that within the Pre-Colombus period.

A lot of what is known regarding the history and origins of the current town is based on the research of Dr. Arquímedes Román and the documents that he found regarding the town's history. According to the documents he found, the Bishop of Puerto Rico, Don Juan Alonso Solís, on September 2, 1640, mentioned the area for the first time by its current name as a place where Spanish authorities and local natives interacted.

== Notable people born in Marigüitar ==
Francisco de Asís Mejía - Born in June 1797, he served during the Venezuelan War of Independence.
