= Cariaco =

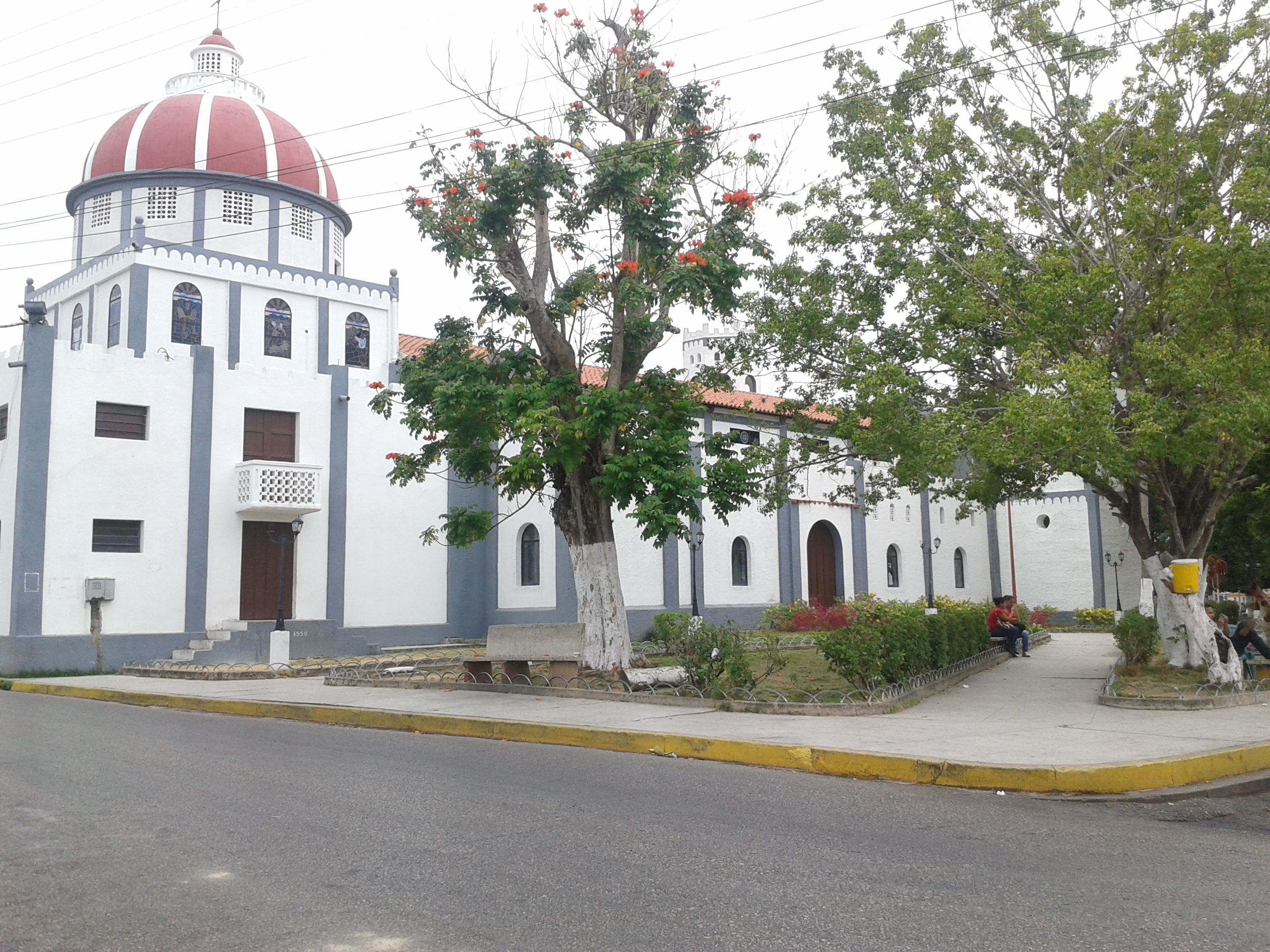
- Iglesia de San Felipe de Austria in the centre of Cariaco.

- Location within Venezuela
- Coordinates: 10.4950°N 63.5526°W
- Country: Venezuela
- State: Sucre
- Municipality: Ribero

Population
  - Total: 38,215
- Time zone: UTC-4:00 (VST)
  - Summer (DST): UTC-4:00 (not observed)

Cariaco is a town in the state of Sucre, Venezuela. It is the capital of the Ribero Municipality. It stands a short distance up the Cariaco river and its port immediately on the coast is known as Puerto Sucre. It is at the head of the Gulf of Cariaco holding the Cariaco Basin.

Near the Church of San Felipe de Austria, is the Plaza El Congreso, named after the Venezuelan Congress. The Mercado Municipal is a market at the heart of the city, near the Parque Democracia and the local stadium.

In 1997, an earthquake measuring 7.0 on the Richter scale occurred. In this event, 39 people died in the parish of Cariaco alone, and there was extensive material damage. Among the losses were the destruction of the Raimundo Martínez Centeno High School, the Valentín Valiente School, and the Estanislao Rendón School, which relocated to a different site after the earthquake.
