= Casanay =

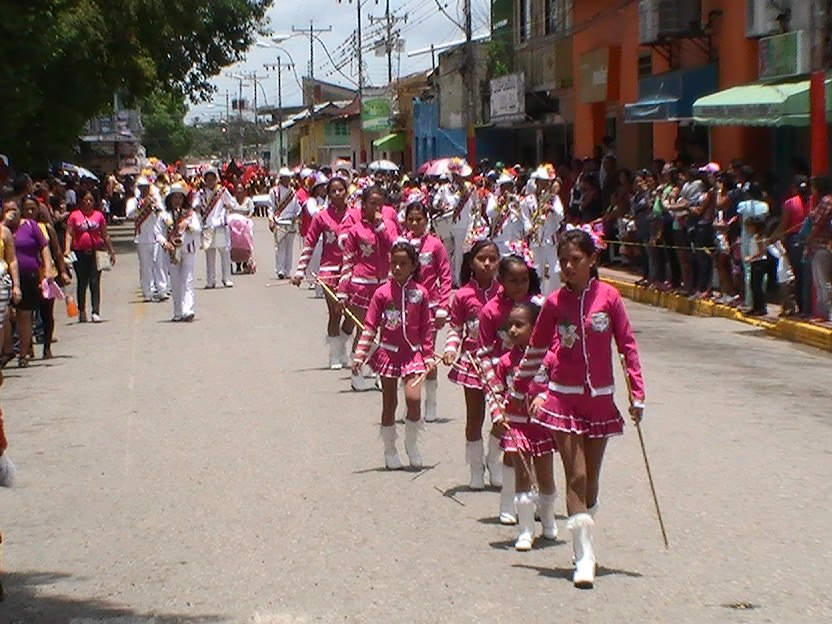

- Location within Venezuela
- Coordinates: 10°30′N 063°24′W
- Country: Venezuela
- State: Sucre
- Time zone: UTC-4:00 (VST)
  - Summer (DST): UTC-4:00 (not observed)

Casanay (10°30′18″N 63°24′46″W) is a town in the Sucre State, Venezuela. It is the shire town of the Andrés Eloy Blanco Municipality, Sucre.
