= Yaguaraparo =

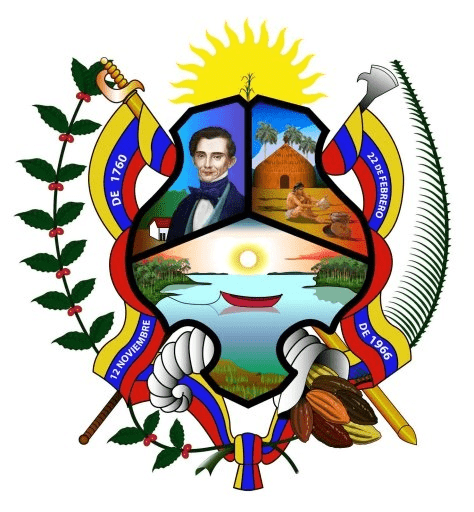
- Coat of arms

- Coordinates: 10°34′N 62°50′W
- Country: Venezuela

Population
  - Total: 15,173

Yaguaraparo is a town in Sucre State, Venezuela. It is the capital of the Cajigal Municipality. As of 2021, it has a population of 15,173.
