= Andrés Mata Municipality =

Andrés Mata Municipality Municipio Andrés Mata
- Municipality
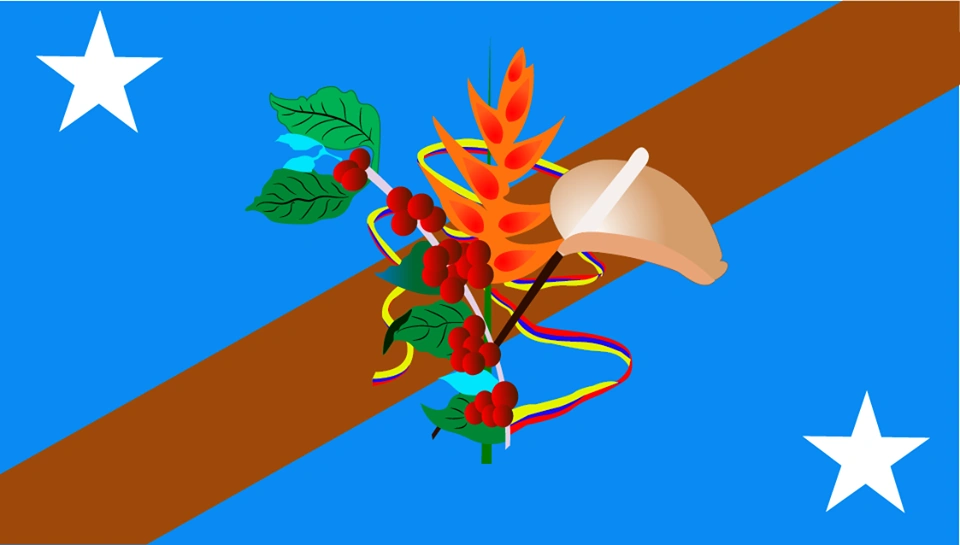
- Flag

- Location in Sucre

- Location in Venezuela
- Coordinates: 10°33′49″N 63°21′29″W
- Country: Venezuela
- State: Sucre
- Municipal seat: San José de Aerocuar
- Time zone: UTC−4 (VET)

Andrés Mata is a municipality of Sucre, Venezuela. It has two parishes and the capital is San José de Aerocuar. As of 2021, it has a population of 24,818.
