= Andrés Eloy Blanco Municipality, Sucre =

Andrés Eloy Blanco Municipality Municipio Andrés Eloy Blanco
- Municipality
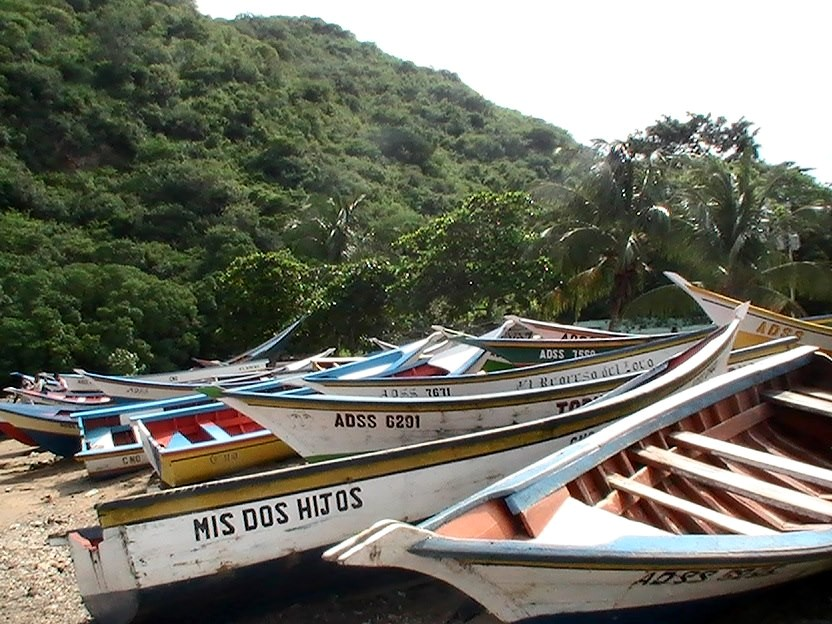

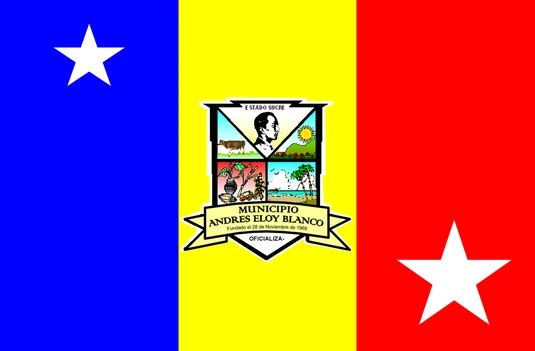
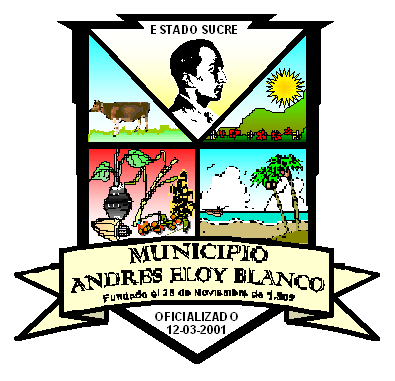
- Flag Seal

- Location in Sucre

- Location in Venezuela
- Coordinates: 10°30′10″N 63°25′08″W
- Country: Venezuela
- State: Sucre
- Municipal seat: Casanay

Area
  - Total: 721 km^{2} (278 sq mi)
- Time zone: UTC−4 (VET)
- Website: Official website

Andrés Eloy Blanco is a municipality of Sucre, Venezuela. It has two parishes and the capital is Casanay. As of 2021, it has a population of 30,981.
