= Ribero Municipality =

Ribero Municipality Municipio Ribero
- Municipality
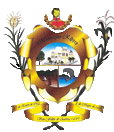
- Coat of arms

- Location in Sucre

- Location in Venezuela
- Coordinates: 10°25′00″N 63°30′00″W
- Country: Venezuela
- State: Sucre
- Municipal seat: Cariaco

Area
  - Total: 1,480 km^{2} (570 sq mi)
- Time zone: UTC−4 (VET)
- Website: Official website

Ribero is a municipality of Sucre, Venezuela. It has five parishes, and the municipal seat is in Cariaco. As of 2021, it has a population of 67,930.
