= Sucre (state) =

State of Venezuela

- State of Venezuela
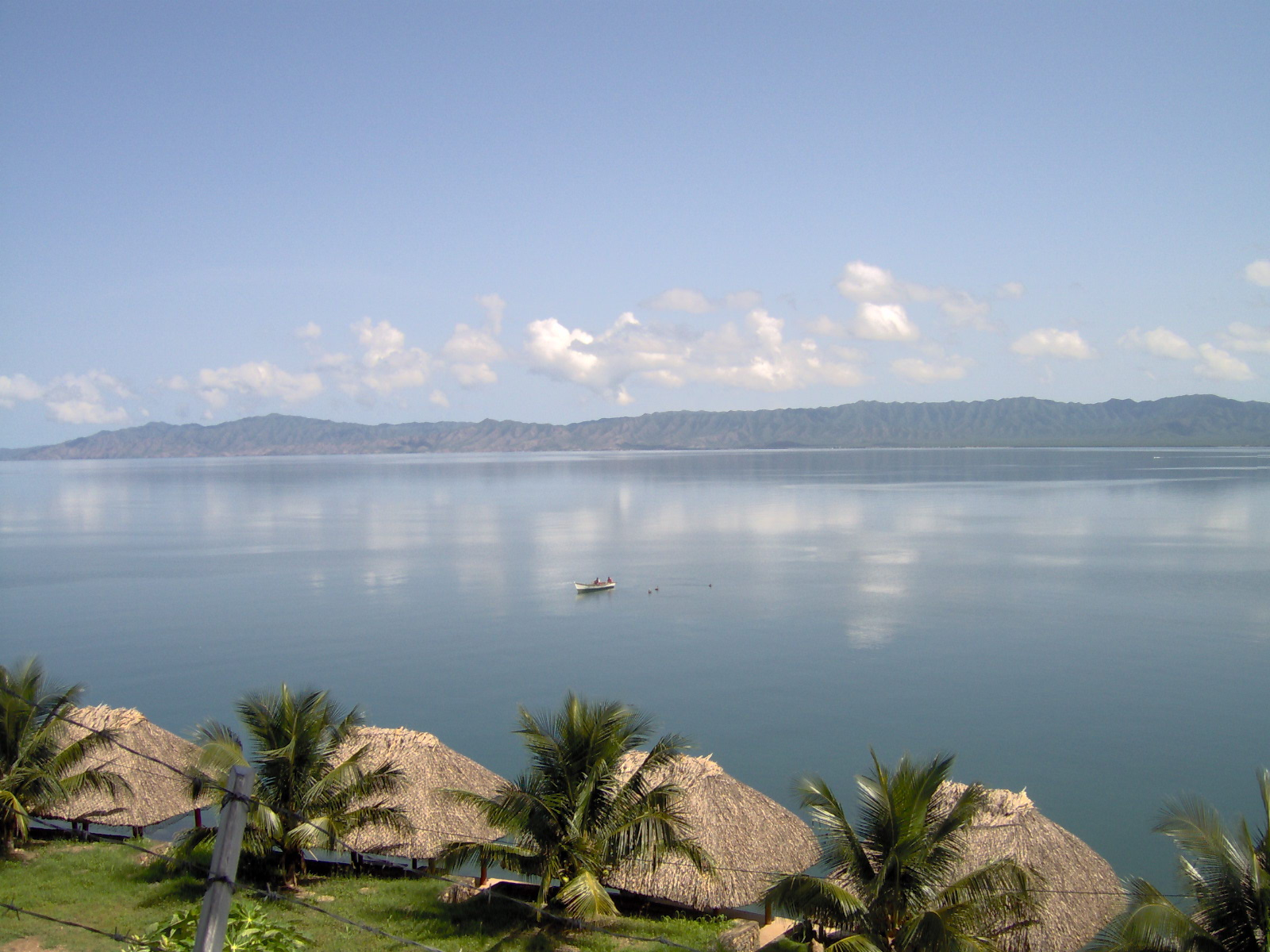
- Gulf of Cariaco

- Flag Coat of arms
- Anthem: Himno del Estado Sucre
- Location within Venezuela
- Country: Venezuela
- Created: 1909
- Capital: Cumaná

Government
  - Body: Legislative Council
  - Governor: Jhoanna Carrillo

Area
  - Total: 11,800 km^{2} (4,600 sq mi)
  - Rank: 14th
- 1.29% of Venezuela

Population (2011 census)
  - Total: 896,921
  - Rank: 10th
- 3.34% of Venezuela
- Time zone: UTC−04:00 (VET)
- ISO 3166 code: VE-R
- Emblematic tree: Roble (Oak) (Platymiscium diadelphum)
- HDI (2019): 0.680 medium · 18th of 24
- Website: www.edosucre.gov.ve

The Sucre State (Spanish: Estado Sucre, IPA: [esˈtaðo ˈsukɾe]) is one of the 23 states of Venezuela. The state capital is Cumaná city. Sucre State covers a total surface area of 11,800 km^{2} (4,600 sq mi) and, as of the 2011 census, had a population of 896,921. The most important river in the state is the Manzanares River.

== History ==
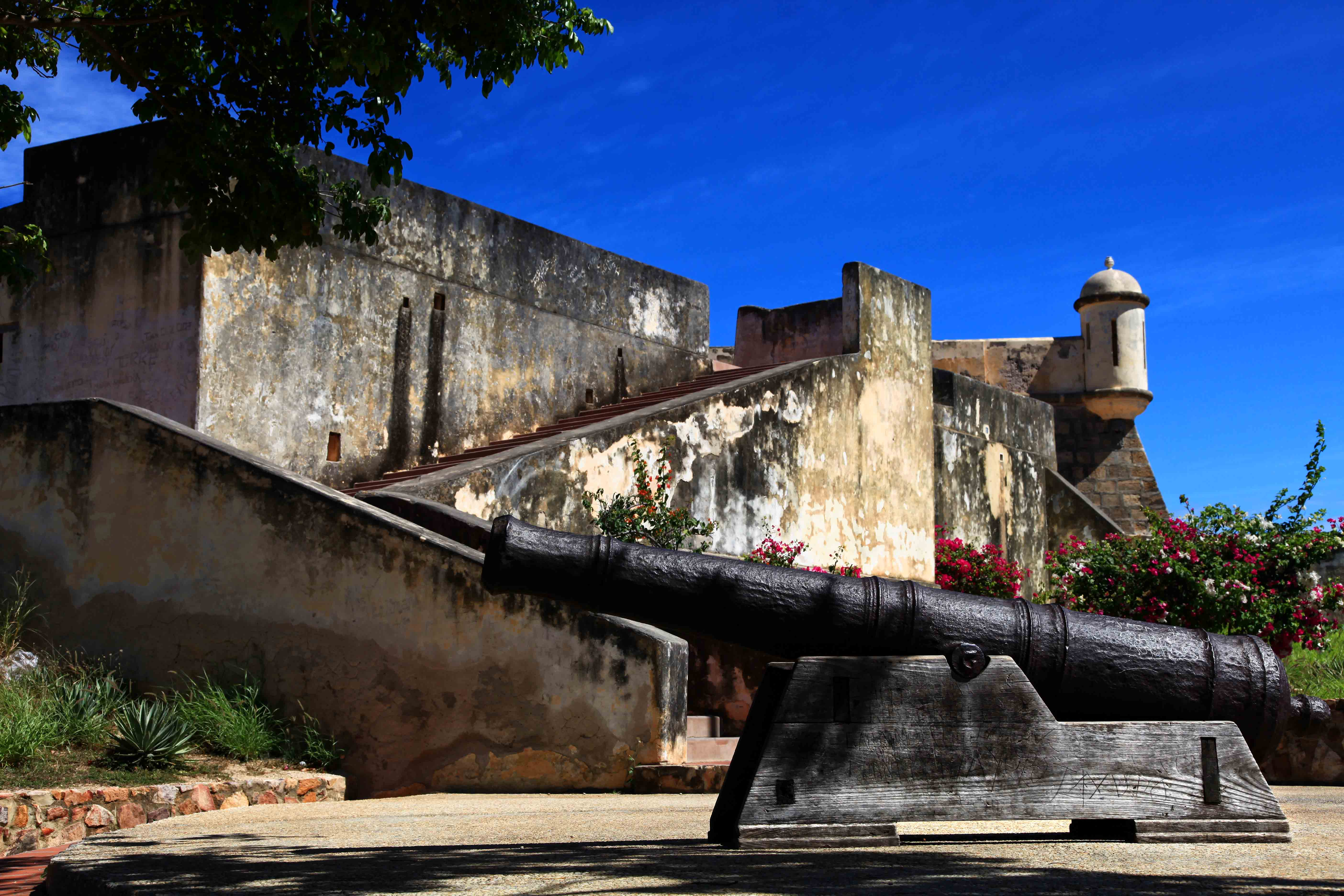
San Antonio de la Eminencia Castle, built between 1659 and 1686

This Venezuelan state was the first Venezuelan land that was touched by the European navigator Christopher Columbus. The latter, impressed by the greenness of the flora, the coasts and the crystalline water of its beaches, called the place "Tierra de Gracia".

=== Spanish colonization ===
The capital of the state is Cumaná, which was founded by Gonzalo de Ocampo in 1521, although Franciscan missionaries began to populate it in 1515. In 1530 it was hit by an earthquake, so it had to be rebuilt. On July 2, 1591, King Philip II of Spain granted Cumaná the title of city.

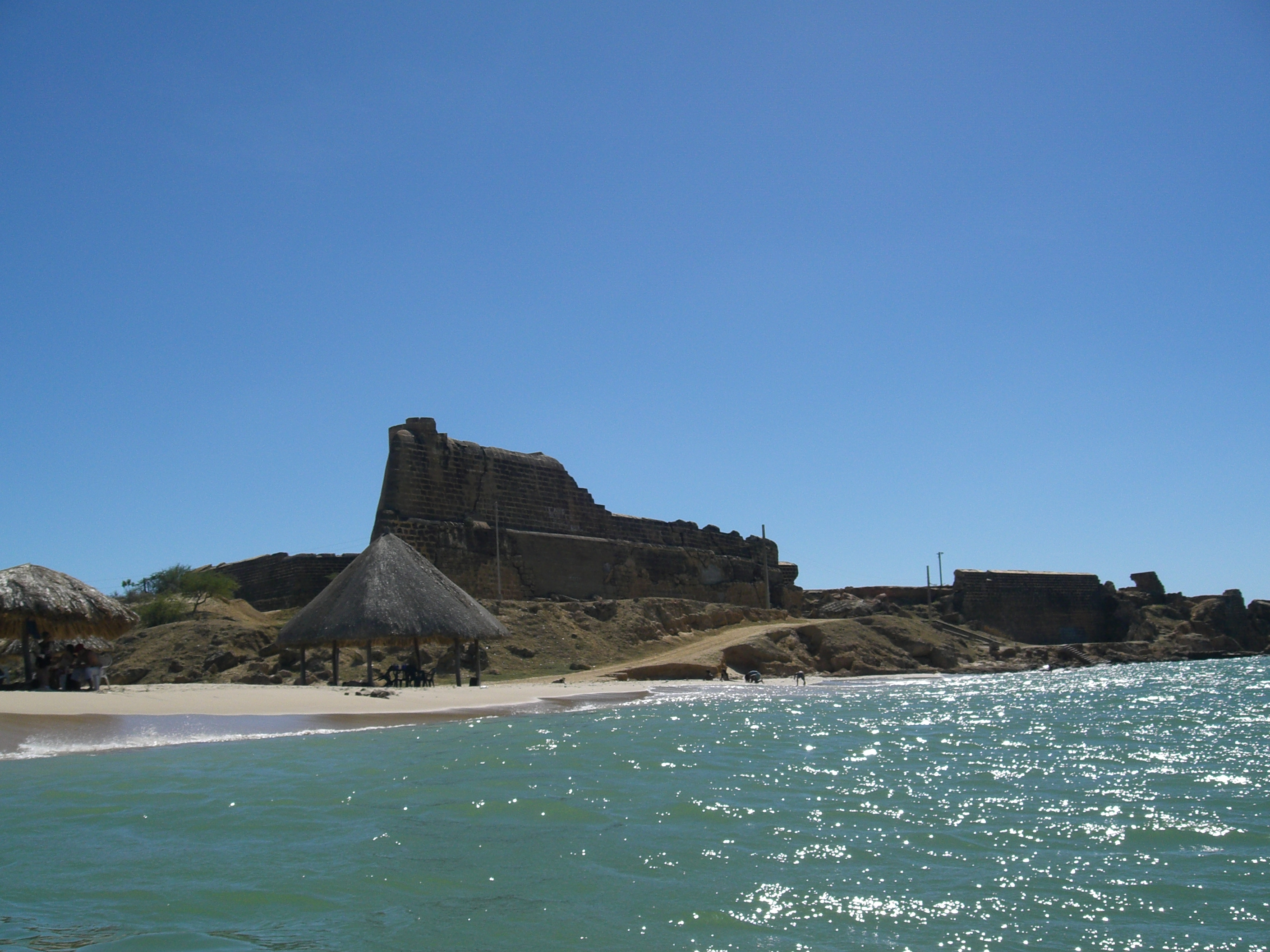
Araya Castle, a fortress built by the Spanish between 1623 and 1630

In 1639, conflicts appeared in the Cumanacoa Valley, as the conqueror Juan de Urpín incorporated Cumanacoa into the territory of his ephemeral Governorate of New Barcelona and obtained authorization to found a colony there. On 18 February 1643, he founded the colony and gave it the name of Santa María de Cumanacoa. Some time later, the Cumanagoto tribe took over the colony and disappeared without a trace.

In the year 1700, by mandate of his Majesty Felipe V, he sent Captain Pedro Antonio Arias y González Manso to resolve the conflict in the Valley. An armed struggle begins with the indigenous tribe Cumanagotos, which maintained control of the valley. Positioning their ships in Carúpano, the siege began up to the Valley of Cumanacoa, a conflict that lasted two years that ended up restoring order and the recovery of all the lands by the Spanish Empire, with the surrender of the indigenous tribes of the region and especially the Cumanagoto. The region of the valley remained under the control of Captain Pedro Antonio Arias and Gonzalez Manso.

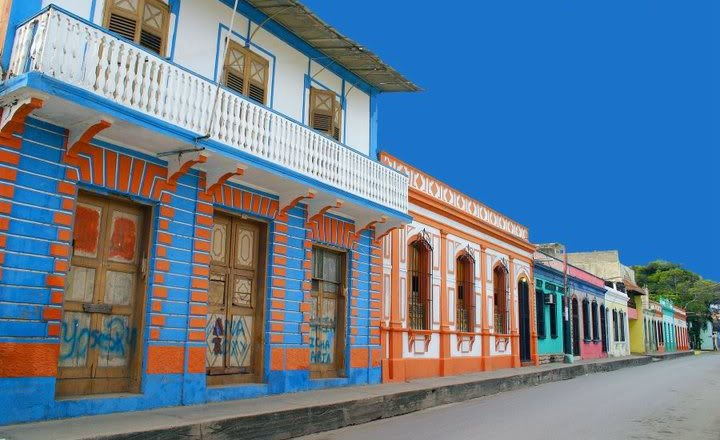
Colonial architecture in Carupano, Sucre state

King Felipe V, pleased with this service to the Spanish Empire, sent him royal orders to establish himself permanently in the Valley with special powers of Governance, Justice and Commerce and to make it a territory that is not subject to the governor of the province of Nueva Andalucía and Nueva Barcelona as well as his appointment as Señorío de San Baltazar de los Arias. In 1705 Captain Pedro Antonio Arias y González Manso founded the region of El Valle with the name of San Baltasar de los Arias, which was definitively preserved until the days of the dictatorship of General Juan Vicente Gomez.

In 1726, the province of Cumaná was composed of Cumaná, Guayana, Barcelona, Maturín and the island of Trinidad. This organization disintegrated as Guiana and Barcelona became independent provinces. In the year 1777, the Captaincy General of Venezuela was created, formed by seven provinces, among which was Cumaná.

=== Contemporary era ===
Following the events in Caracas in April 1810, commissioners arrived in Cumaná, and a meeting was called to form a Provisional Board, which assumed control of the province's government. Cumaná was one of 11 provinces created when Gran Colombia was disbanded and José Antonio Páez became president of Venezuela. The city was once again devastated by an earthquake in 1853.

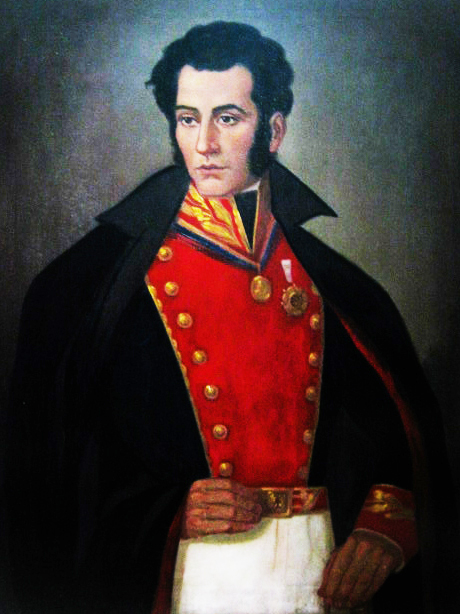
Antonio José de Sucre, Grand Marshal of Ayacucho, one of Venezuela's national heroes

In 1891 the so-called Great State of Bermúdez was created, until 1898, when it finally adopted the name of "State of Sucre". In 1901 the State of Sucre was created, separated from Maturín, and in 1904 it was integrated again into the State of Bermúdez. By 1909 the limits of the states of Sucre and Monagas were definitively drawn as two separate entities.

The Cariaco earthquake in 1997 is considered the most serious to have occurred in Venezuela since the earthquake that affected Caracas on July 27, 1967. In this last earthquake, the surface rupture that occurred in the Pilar Fault segment was particularly irregular, with cosmic displacements of approximately 0.25 m and a process of soil shaking recorded on the coastline.

In March 2026, the entire Sucre estate suffered from the absence of a water supply for over three weeks caused by a failure in the Turimiquire supply the 22nd of February, and a water emergency was declared by Governor Jhoanna Carillo on the 7th of March 2026.

== Geography ==
The state of Sucre is located in the east of Venezuela. It borders the Caribbean Sea to the north, the states of Monagas and Anzoátegui to the south, the Gulf of Paria to the east and the Gulf of Cariaco to the west. The name is a tribute to Grand Marshal Antonio José de Sucre, who was born in the city of Cumaná, the capital of the state. It has an area of 11,800 square kilometers, representing 1.28% of the national total of Venezuela.

The state of Sucre is located almost in the eastern cordillera; in the northern part is the double peninsula, which in the east is the peninsula of Paria and in the west is the peninsula of Araya, dividing the slopes of the rivers, which flow into the gulfs of Paria and Cariaco, respectively. The main heights of the Eastern Cordillera are Cerro Negro, Peonia, Majagual and Arrempuja, all of them at more than 1900 m., the highest point being the Turimiquire peak with its almost 2600 m.

=== Municipalities ===
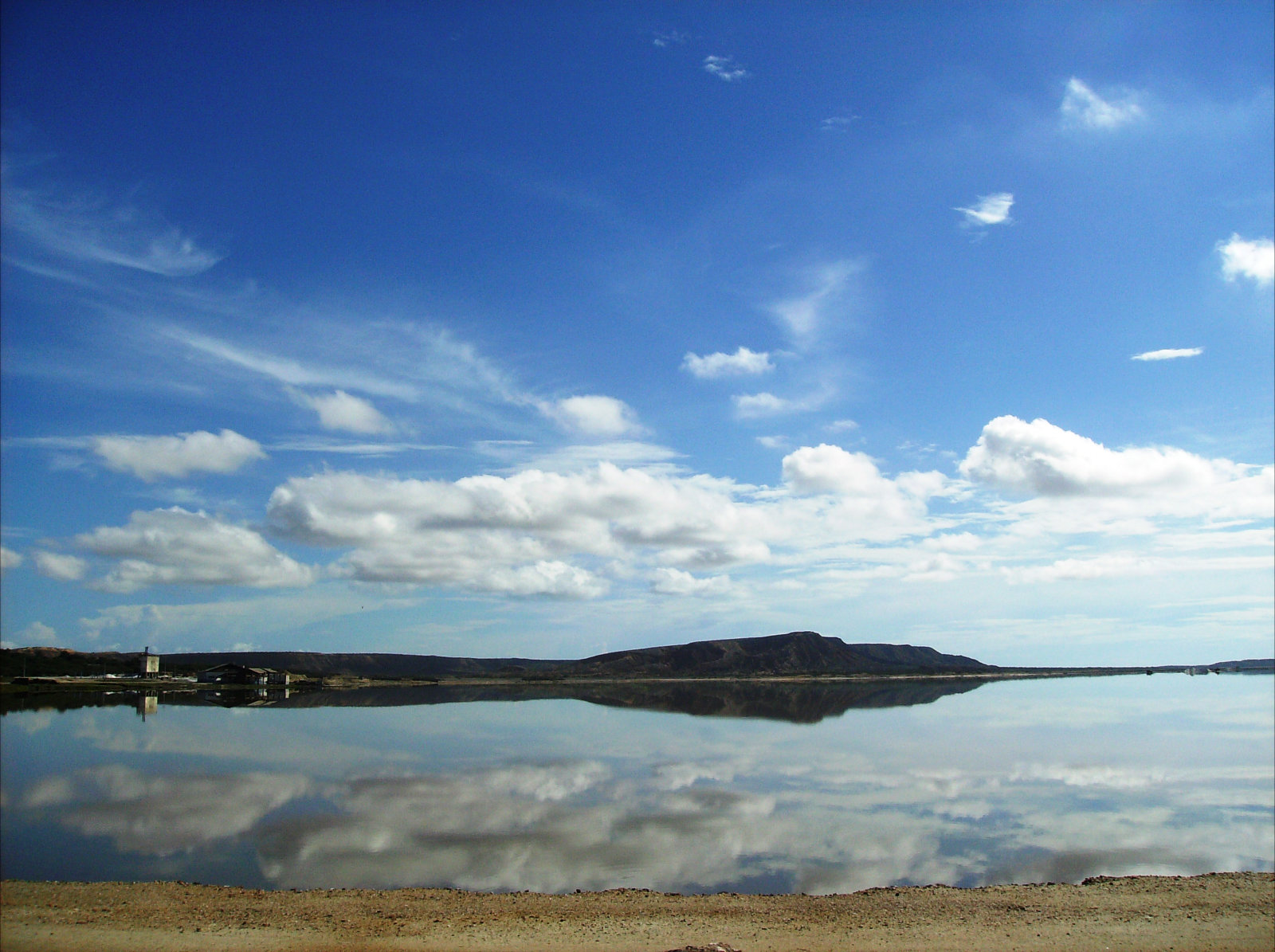
Cruz Salmeron Acosta Municipality

- Andrés Eloy Blanco (Casanay)
- Andrés Mata (San José de Aerocuar)
- Arismendi (Río Caribe)
- Benítez (El Pilar)
- Bermúdez (Carúpano)
- Bolívar (Marigüitar)
- Cajigal (Yaguaraparo)
- Cruz Salmerón Acosta (Araya)
- Libertador (Tunapuy)
- Mariño (Irapa)
- Mejía (San Antonio del Golfo)
- Montes (Cumanacoa)
- Ribero (Cariaco)
- Sucre (Cumaná)
- Valdez (Güiria)

=== Hydrography ===
Some of the most important rivers in the State of Sucre are the following

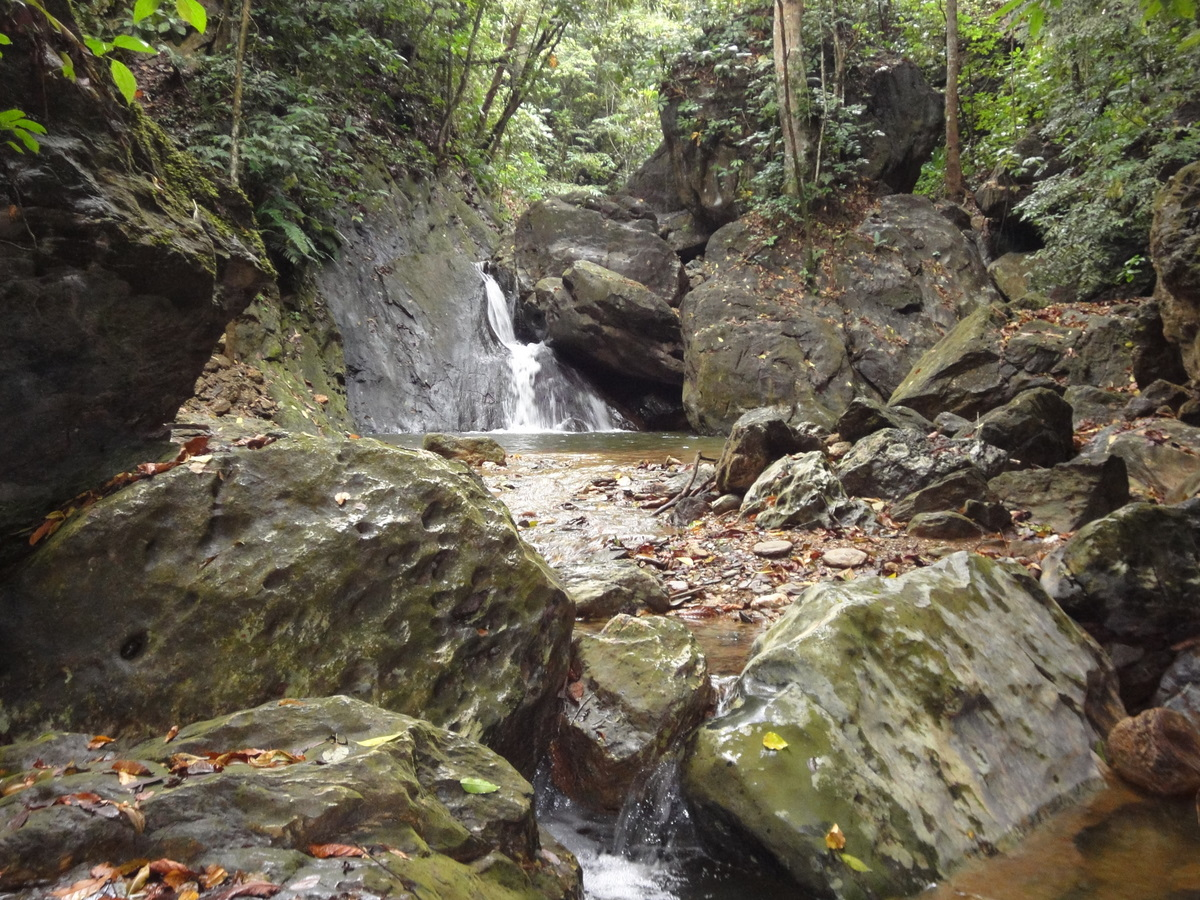
Pozo Agual, Sucre State

Ríos Neverí (117 km.), which crosses the city of Barcelona, Mochima and Manzanares, the latter of 81 km., passes through the capital city of Cumaná. All of them flow into the Caribbean Sea.

In the Gulf of Cariaco, one of the main rivers of the state, the Carinicuao or Cariaco, which is 173 km long, pours its waters. Of lesser importance, but also from the same basin are the Cautaro, Tunantal, Guaracayal, Compondrón, San Pedro and Marigüitar. In the Caribbean Sea basin, rivers of lesser importance such as the Chaure, Caribe, Unare and Cumaná flow into the river. Finally, after traveling 173 km, the San Juan River deposits its waters in the Gulf of Paria, as do the Irapa, Aruca, Güiria, Guiramo, Grande, Manacal and Yoco rivers.

=== Relief ===
The relief of Sucre State is formed especially by mountainous landscapes, with some valleys not very extensive. The Turimiquire mountain range, to the southwest, shows a rough relief, with steep slopes and heights reaching 2500 meters, while the mountainous system of the Paria Peninsula is characterized by hills of lower elevation. The coast of Sugarcane, essentially towards the west, has all the characteristics of a sinking coast: deep, with large cliffs and scarce beach formation. In contrast, towards the southeast of the entity, in the Gulf of Paria, the land is very flat, with slopes of less than 1% and with insufficient drainage, which has turned it into swampy plains.

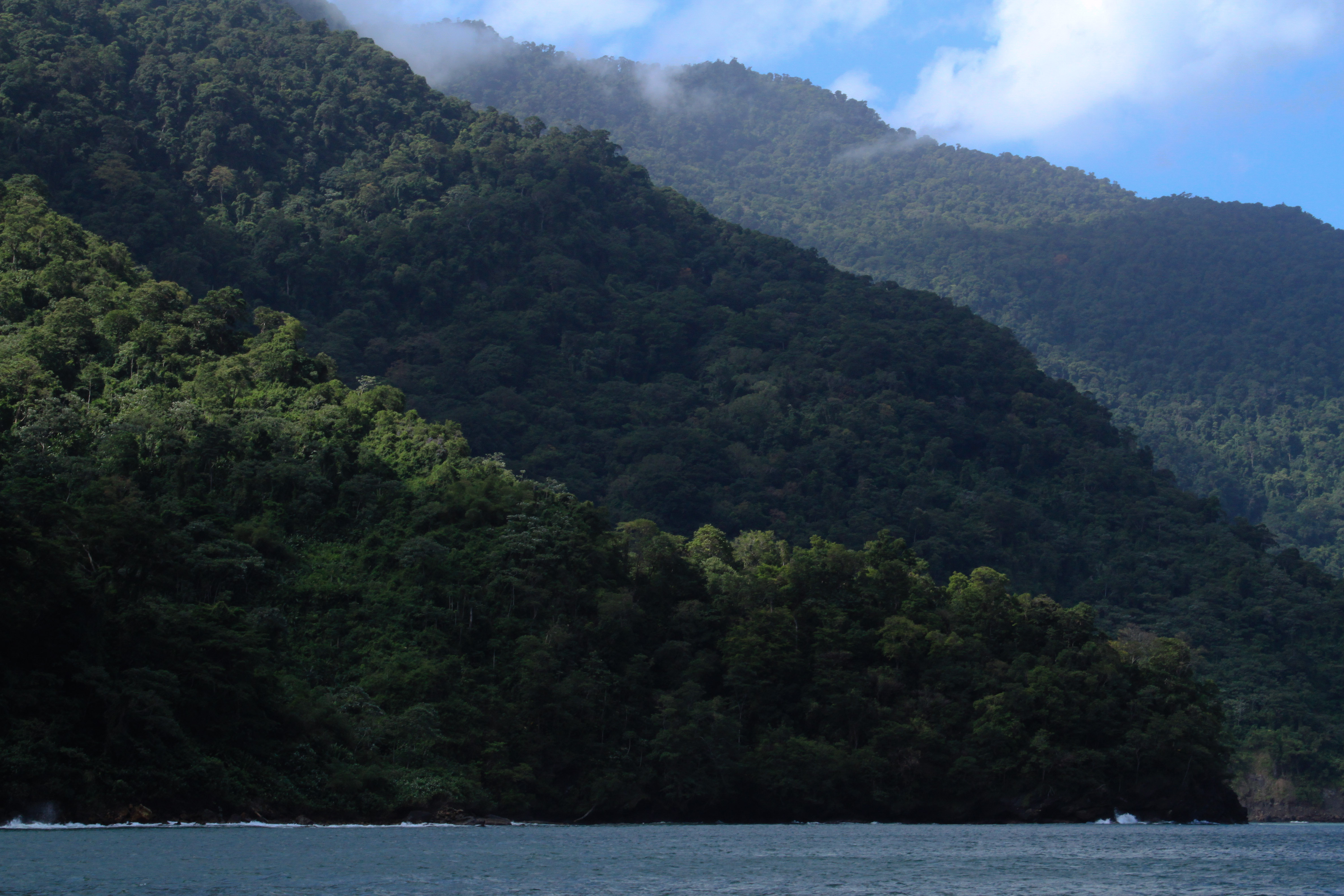
Paria Peninsula, Sucre State

=== Vegetation ===
The vegetation of Sucre State is xerophytic in the coastal areas and mountainous in the rural areas located in the Coastal Range; one can also find Caribbean beach plants and trees, such as coconut and cocoa trees, as well as the oak, which has been declared a state tree.

In Paria, the vegetation ranges from cloud forest at 1000 meters and annual rainfall calculated between 1000 and 1500 millimeters to xerophytic as we approach the coast. Its warm and rainy climate is conducive to vegetation, which is home to species transported by the waters of the Orinoco River from Guyana and native species, which are only found in this area (endemic)."

=== Fauna ===
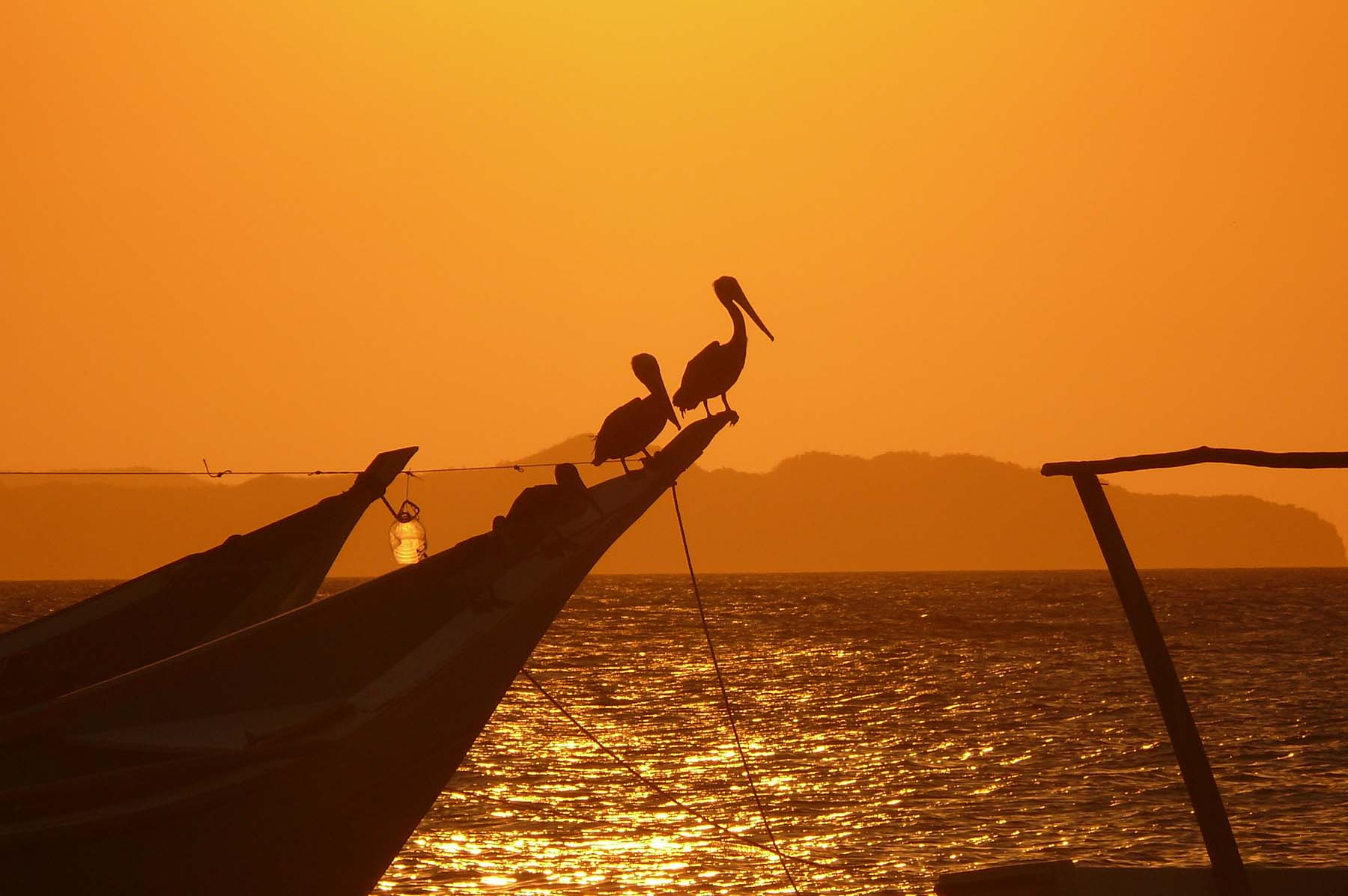
Pelicans in San Juan de Las Galdonas, Sucre state

The conditions that prevail in the area of the Paria Peninsula favor the presence of important bird species and subspecies new to science that live only inside the park, such as the colorful earwig hummingbird. Among the mammals are the white-faced capuchin monkey and the spiny rat, as well as deer, foxes, spider monkeys, and báquiros.

In the Eastern Cordillera bioregion, which includes almost the entire state of Sucre, except for the muddy plain, 125 species of mammals have been recorded, equivalent to 38.2% of the national total (20). The largest number of species is found in the evergreen and cloud forests. So far no endemics have been found, and many species are common also in other nearby and distant bioregions, as is the case with the bat black mastiff (Molossus sinaloe) - also distributed in the Central Cordillera -, the two-fingered guava sloth (Choloepus didactylus), the dwarf anteater (Cyclopes didactylus), the common water mouse (Neusticomys venezuelae), the bat The Greater white bat (Diclidurus ingens) and the White-winged sucker bat (Thyroptera tricolor), species located in the deltaic and southern Orinoco bioregions.

Among the mammals reported in the bioregion, not including the Araya Peninsula find the common cachicamo (Dasypus novencinctus), the cuchicuchi (Potos flavus), the red deer (Odocoileus virginianus). Including the Araya Peninsula, the common fox (Cerdocyon thous), the savannah rabbit (Sylvilagus floridanus), the common porcupine (Coendu prehensilis), the common picure (Dasyprocta leporina), the common squirrel (Sciurus granatensis) and the cardon bat (Leptonycteris curasoae).

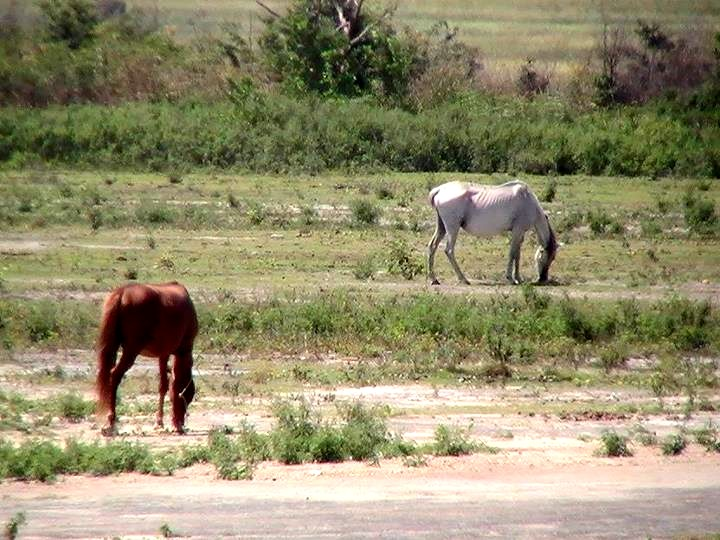
Horses in Casanay, Sucre State

Most mammals are bats, which have an important role in the pollination of numerous plants and in the dispersal of seeds. The swampy plain of the Ajíes-Río San Juan stream covers a small area of the bioregion of the deltaic system, where fewer mammals have been recorded, only 96, equivalent to 29.3% of the national total. However, there is an endemic and exclusive species, the Picure deltano (Dasyprocta guamara), with a wide distribution in the Neotropics.

In this area there are three semi-aquatic species: the water opossum (Chironectes minimus), the neotropical otter (Lontra longicaudis), and the giant otter (Pteronura). This is an area of global importance for the distribution of the manatee (Trichechus manatus), since significant populations of this species have been found in the world.

=== Climate ===
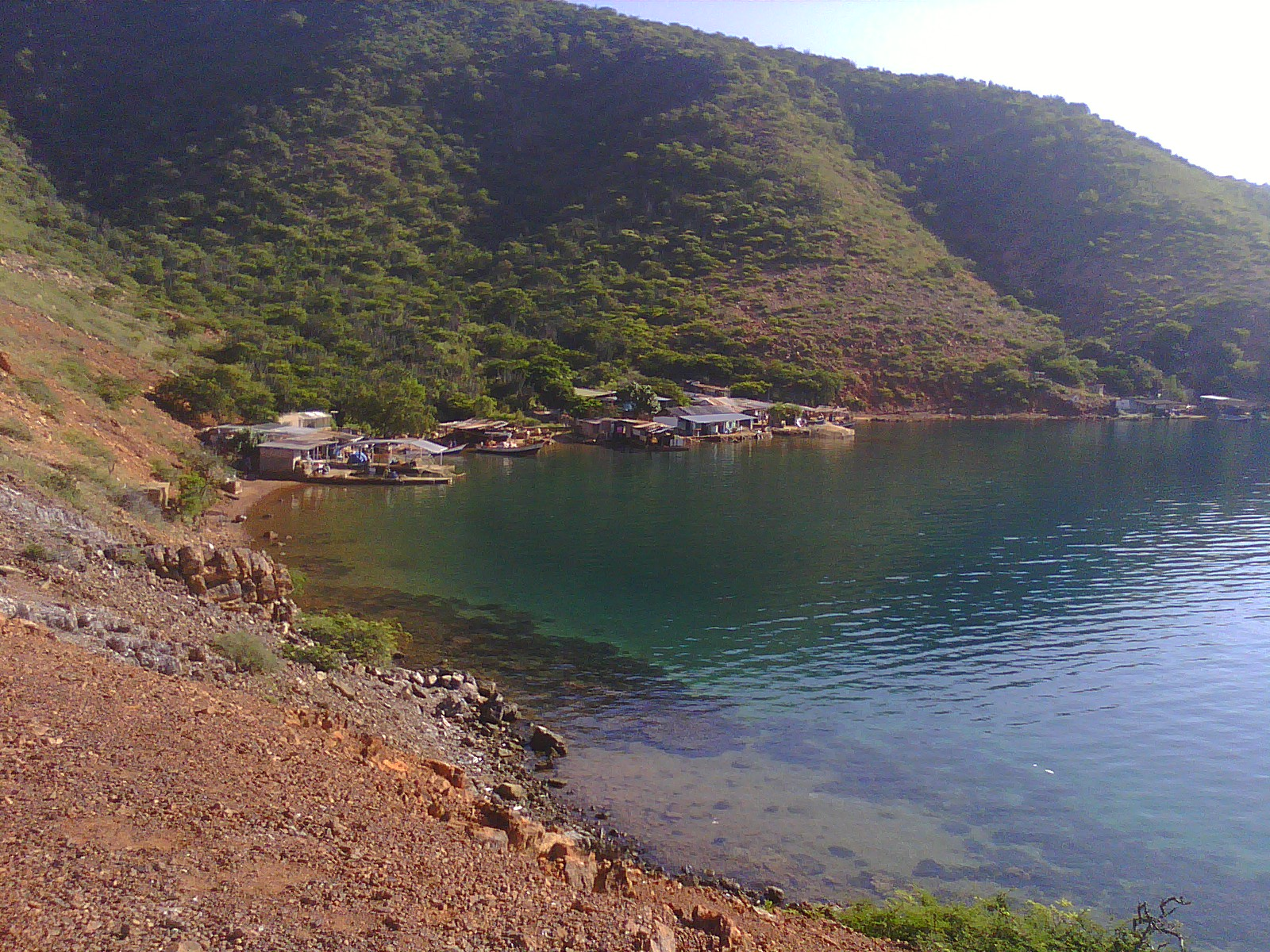
Caracas Islands, Mochima National Park, Sucre State

In the western coastal area, a semi-arid climate can be observed, with an average annual temperature of 24-26 °C in Cumaná and rainfall of 375 mm. The Araya Peninsula is a representative area of strong climate in terms of drought and aridity conditions. In the southern parallel strip, a rainy tropical savanna climate is observed, which extends to the area of the coastal slope to the Caribbean Sea. In Carúpano, average temperatures of 26-35 °C and changing rainfall of 524–1,046 mm are observed. In the Gulf of Paria the average annual rainfall increases from 1,200 to more than 2,000 mm with a forested climate. In the area of the interior mountain range, there is a section where the tropical climate prevails at high altitudes.

== Government and politics ==
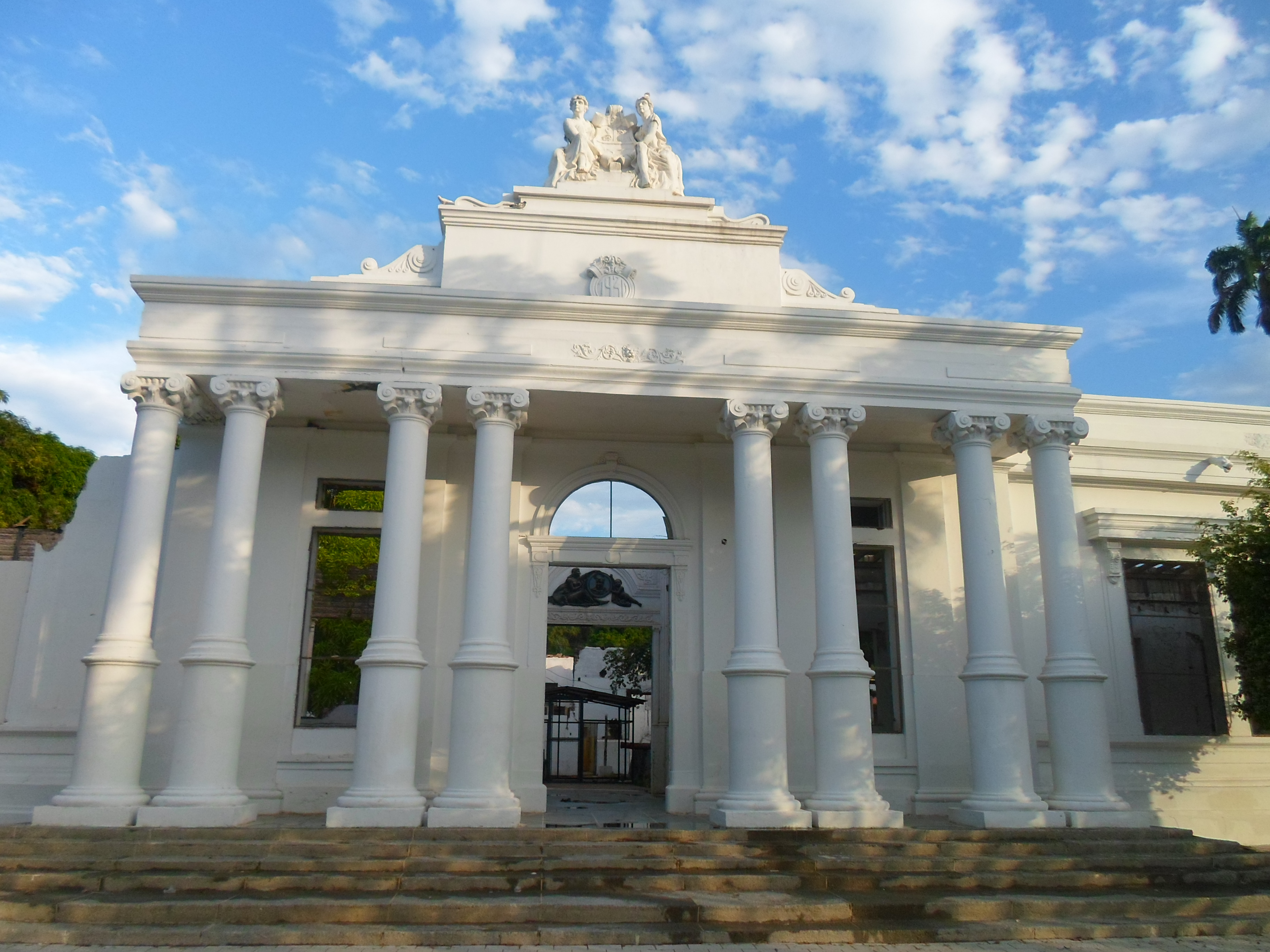
Front view of Sucre's Government Palace

The state is autonomous and equal in political terms to the rest of the Republic. It organizes its administration and public powers through the Constitution of the State of Sucre, dictated by the Legislative Council and published in the special official gazette of the State of Sucre, number 742, on November 13, 2002.

=== Executive power ===
It is composed of the governor of the state of Sucre and a group of state secretaries. The governor is elected by the people through direct and secret vote for a period of four years, with the possibility of immediate reelection for an equal period, being in charge of the state administration.

Since 1989, Sucre has elected a governor; until that year the governors were appointed directly from the National Executive.

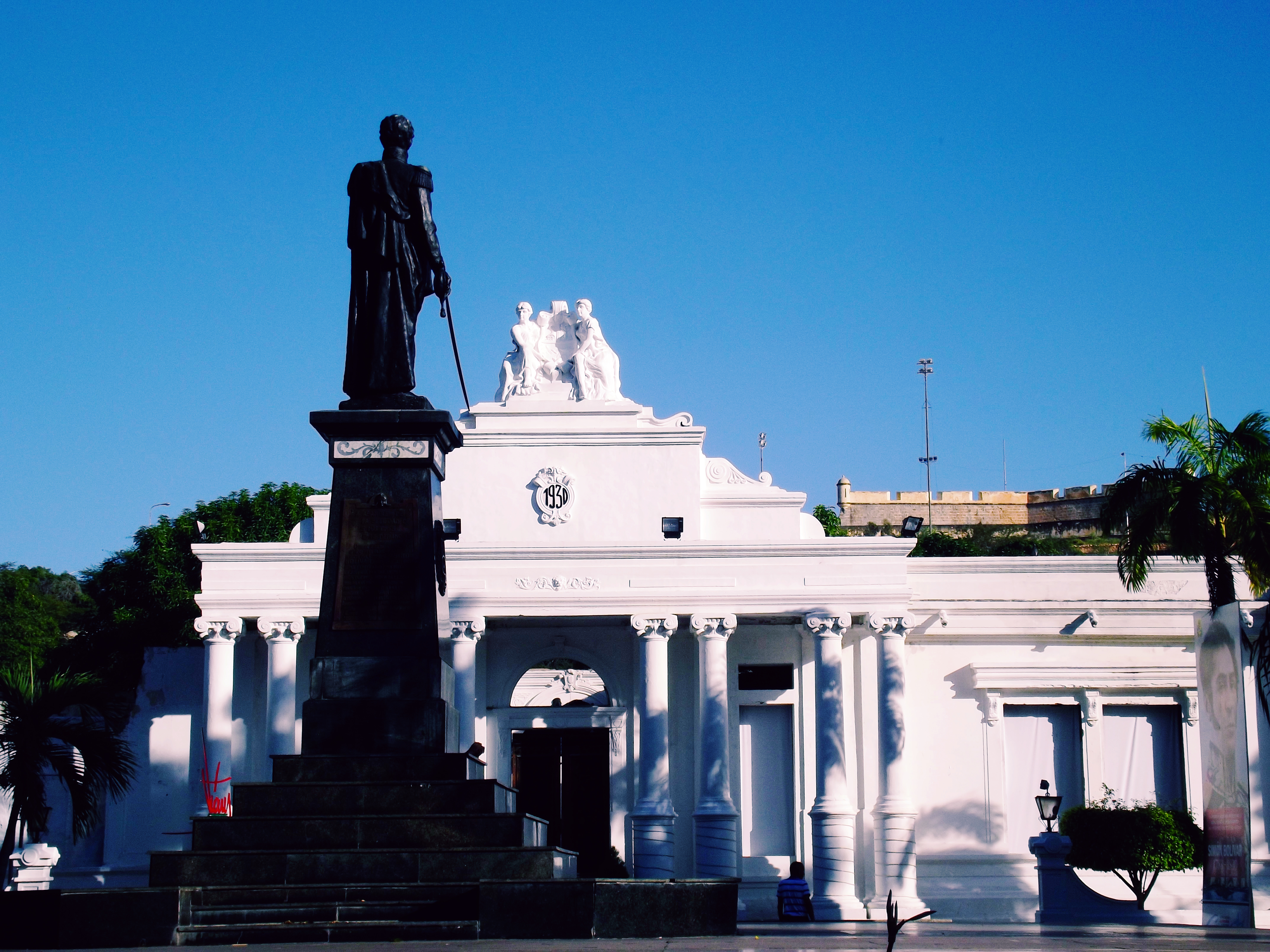
Plaza Bolívar in Cumana, with the Sucre State Government Palace in the background

Like other states, the structure of the government of Sucre is laid out in the Constitution.

=== Legislative power ===
The state legislature is the responsibility of the Legislative Council of the State of Sucre, which is unilateral and whose members are elected by the people by direct and secret vote every four years, and may be re-elected for two consecutive periods, under a system of proportional representation of the population of the State and its municipalities. The state has eleven regional legislators.

The state legislature is made up of a single body, the Consejo Legislativo. It has the power to pass the state's budget law.

Like the other 23 federal entities of Venezuela, the state maintains its own police force, which is supported and complemented by the Venezuelan National Police and the Venezuelan National Guard.

== Demographics ==
Historical population
Year	Pop.	±% p.a.
1873	62,181	—
1881	78,459	+2.95%
1891	92,030	+1.61%
1920	150,211	+1.70%
1926	216,476	+6.28%
1936	262,344	+1.94%
1941	291,452	+2.13%
1950	333,607	+1.51%
1961	401,992	+1.71%
1971	469,004	+1.55%
1981	585,698	+2.25%
1990	679,595	+1.67%
2001	786,483	+1.34%
2011	896,291	+1.32%
Source: "XIV CENSO NACIONAL DE POBLACIÓN Y VIVIENDA - Resultados por Entidad Federal y Municipio del Estado Sucre" (PDF). Instituto Nacional de Estadística.

=== Race and ethnicity ===
According to the 2011 Census, the racial composition of the population was:

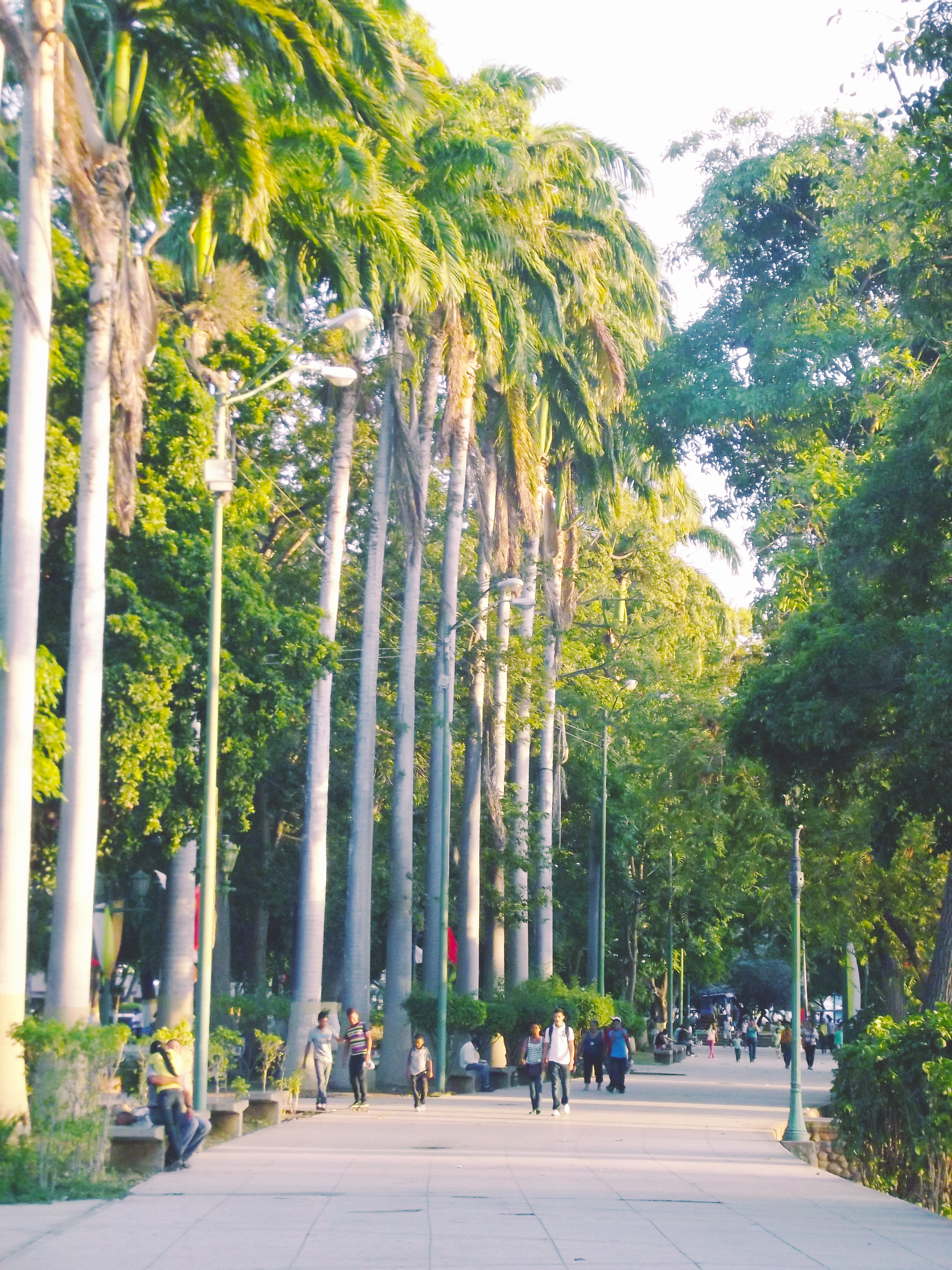
Ayacucho Park, Cumaná

Racial composition	Population	%
Mestizo	—N/a	54.7
White	375,688	38.5
Black	47,815	4.9
Other race	—N/a	1.9

=== Population centers ===
The main towns in Sucre State are the following:

- Cumaná: Cumaná is the capital city and seat of the public powers of the state, very famous for its beaches, but it is also important historically for being the birthplace of the great Marshal of Ayacucho, the independence hero Antonio José de Sucre; besides being recognized for its antiquity and multiple historical sites present, as they are: The Castle of San Antonio de la Eminencia, The Castle Santa María de la Cabeza, The Fort Santa Ana, The Metropolitan Cathedral Sacred Eucharistic Heart of Jesus, The Monument, Church co-cathedral of Santa Inés, the Manzanares River, which divides the city into two parts and is one of the oldest treasures that this great population site has, among other great variety of places that make Cumaná the Firstborn of the American Continent, with a great history from the colonial era to our times.
- Carúpano: It was the first port of America with the old continent to have an underwater cable, which is still maintained in the house of the cable, as well as its historical center that is still preserved around the temple Cathedral Santa Rosa de Lima and its majestic tourist carnival of Venezuela. Its rich culture makes it emblematic, and because of its beaches, a resting place for visitors.

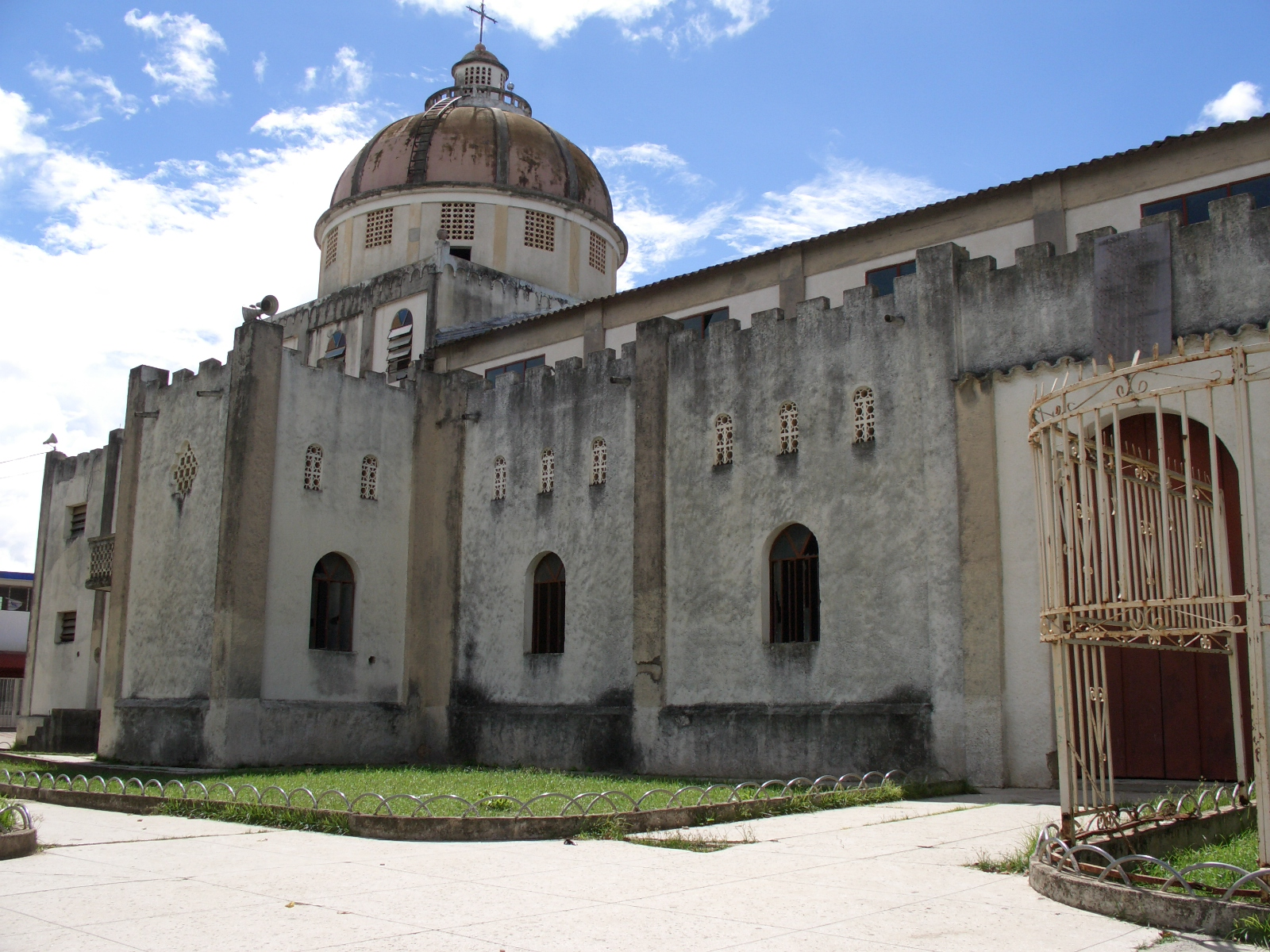
Church of San Felipe de Austria, Cariaco

- Güiria: It is an important port and tourist place for the population of Sucre, touristically and economically. One of the most important gas reserves in the world was discovered on its coasts.
- Cariaco: This population center is excellent to rest eat, and it is also a tourist and economic port.
- Araya: Araya is located in the State of Sucre, in the homonymous peninsula; it is an excellent zone for tourism; for that reason, it is one of the favorite destinations of this state, beaches of white sand and very amiable settlers.

Other towns include Cumanacoa, San Antonio del Golfo, Irapa, Tunapuy, Yaguaraparo, Marigüitar, El Pilar, Río Caribe, San José de Areocuar and Casanay.

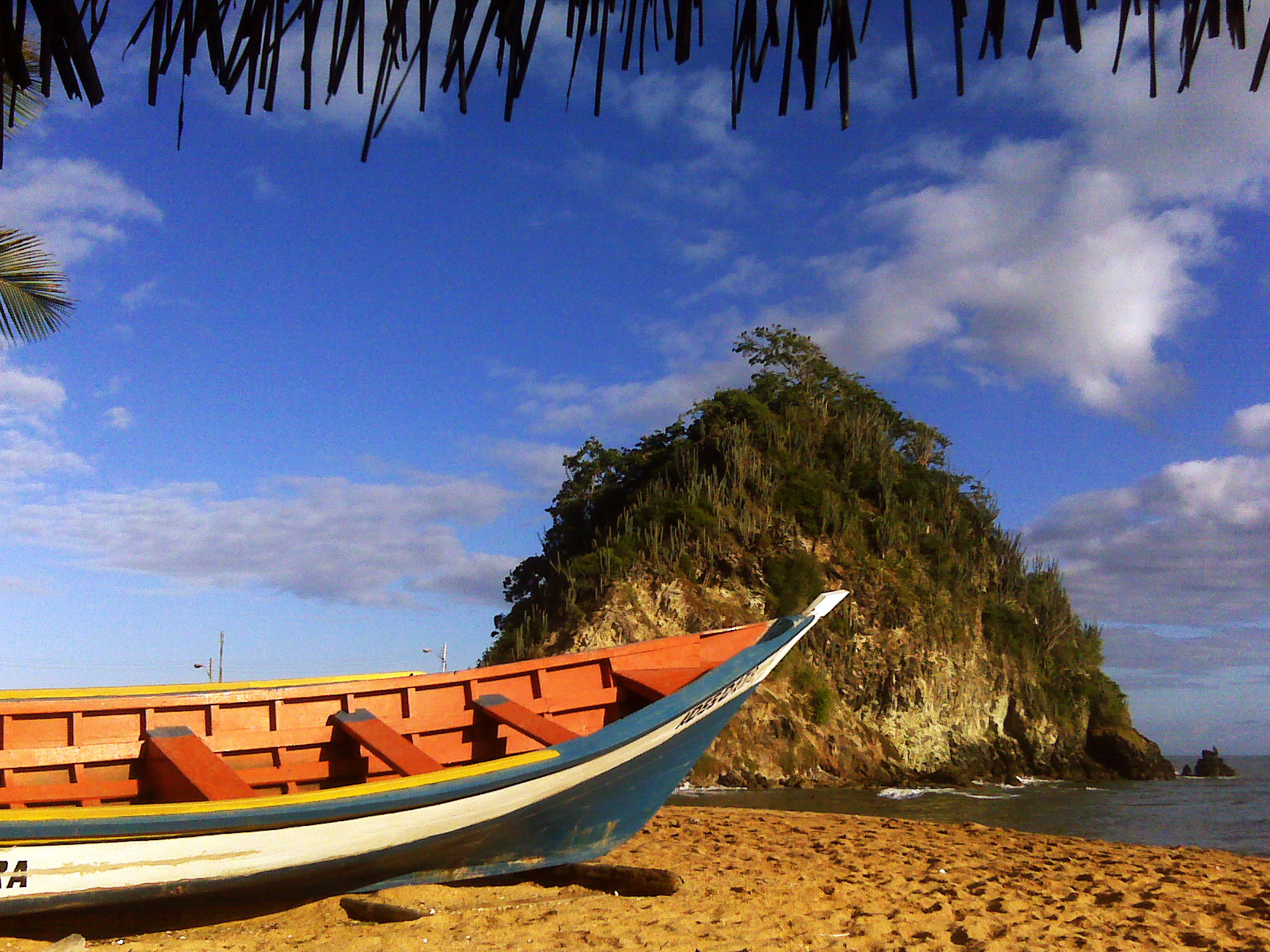
Copey, Sucre State

== Economy ==
The state's economy is based on fishing, where it is the main producer of fish in Venezuela. Almost 50% of the national production is from this state and supplies 95% of the raw material to the fish processing industry for products such as sardines, tuna, horse mackerel, mullet, grouper, shrimp, and lobsters. Almost half of the country's fishing and artisanal fleet is concentrated in this state.

=== Resources ===
- Fishermen: Tuna, snappers, sardines, among others.
- Vegetable resources: Cocoa, coffee, sugar cane, aloe, among others.
- Forestry resources: Common wood, oaks, carob tree, among others.
- Mineral resources: Sulfur, gas, oil, salt, among others.
- Energy resources: It has been determined that in the state of Sucre there are sources of geothermal energy (calculated at 150 MW as a first approximation) and wind energy.

== Tourism ==
The Mochima National Park, which is shared by the Venezuelan states of Anzoátegui and Sucre, has varied Caribbean seascapes, large beaches and small islands. It also has several species of birds, fish, molluscs and other animals (fauna) and plants (flora). The Araya Peninsula is another popular tourist destination, with a desert landscape, similar to the nearby Margarita Island.

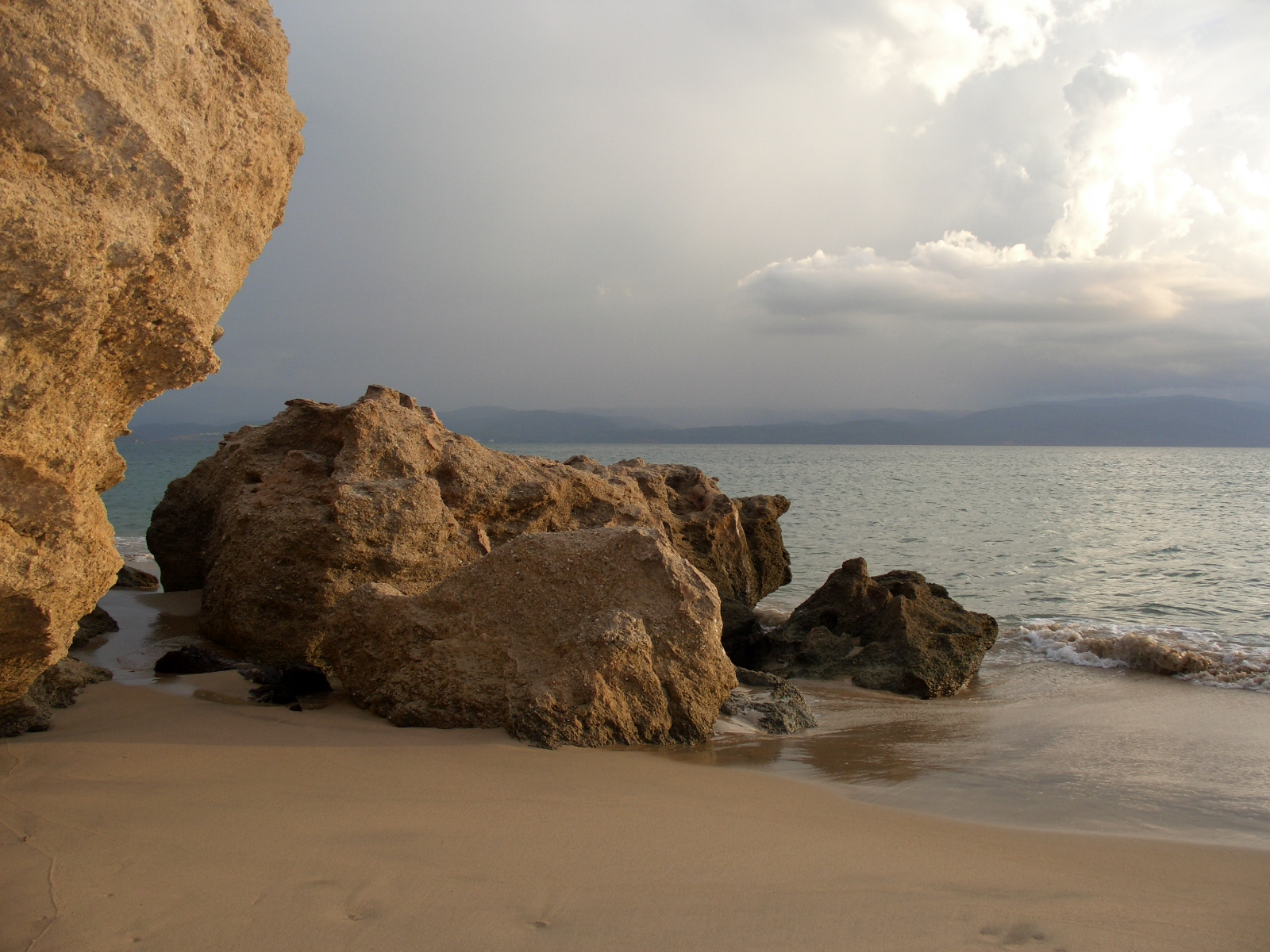
Araya Peninsula

The following protected islands in Mochima National Park belong to the State of Sucre:

- Caracas Islands
  - Caracas del Este
  - Caracas del Oeste
- Los Muertos Island
- Arapo Islands
- Ancha Island
- Cuadrada Island
- Santa Marta Island

The Trunk 9, the coastal road that allows access to Cumaná, Carúpano and Güiria, is The "Ruta del Sol" which is characterized by views of the Altos de Santa Fe and Cariaco.

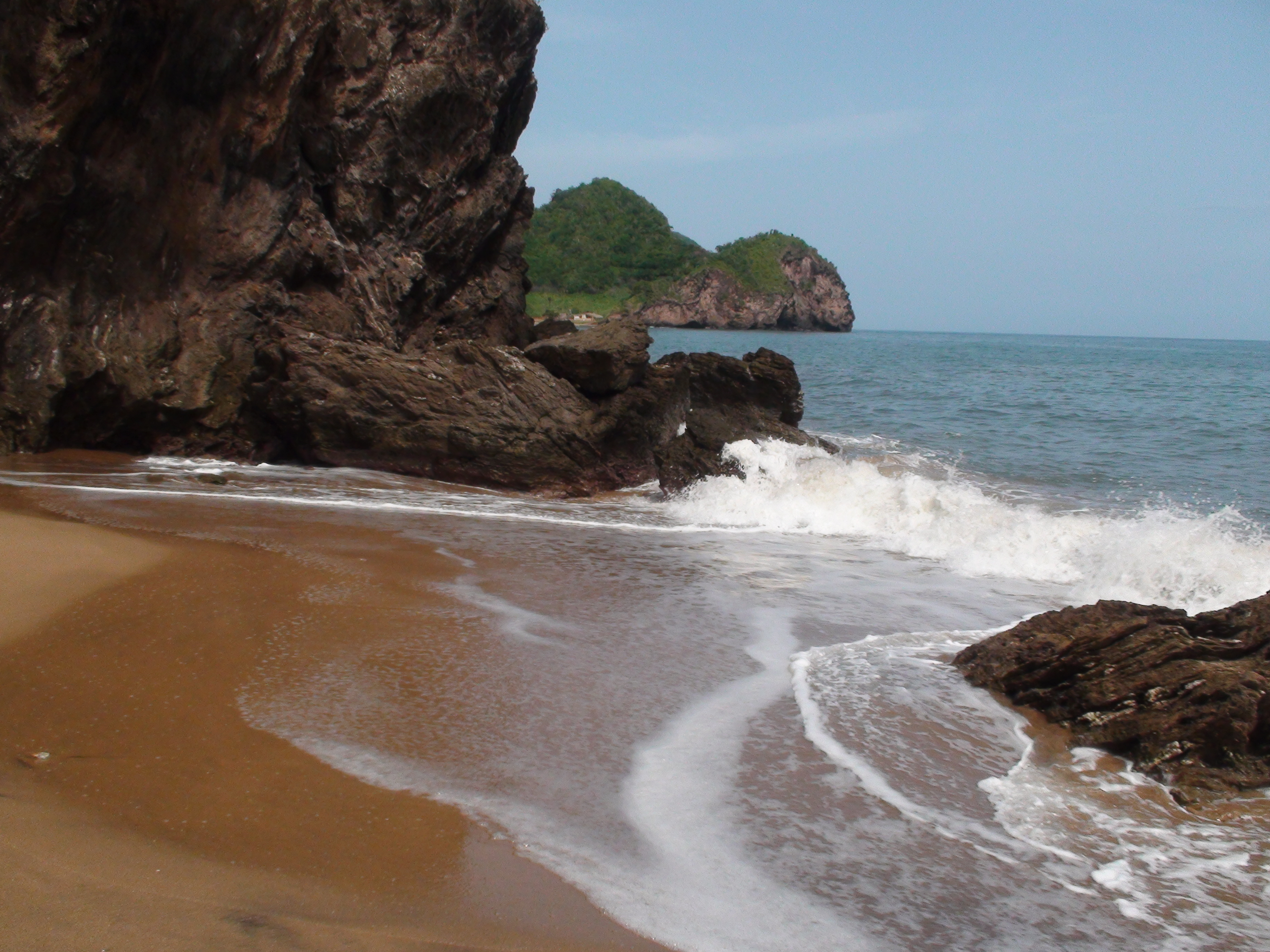
Uva Beach

The natural environment of the state of Sucre includes the mountains of Araya-Paria, Turimiquire, San Bonifacio and La Paloma; the intermontane landscapes, represented by the valleys, foothills and hills; the extensive coastline of the Gulfs of Cariaco and Paria, and the Caribbean Sea, where you can find coral reefs, beaches, capes and coves, as well as the extensive fluvial-marine plain of the San Juan River-Aruca River.

Among the beaches are Arapito, Colorada, Varadero, Playa Blanca and Mochima, located in Mochima National Park, and the existing ones in the northern coast of the Paria peninsula such as Chaguaramas, Medina, Puipuy, San Juan of Las Galdonas, Querepare, Pargo, Uquire and San Francisco. On the south coast of the peninsula of Paria requires special mention those of Macuro, Yacua, Mapire, Rio Grande and Cauranta.

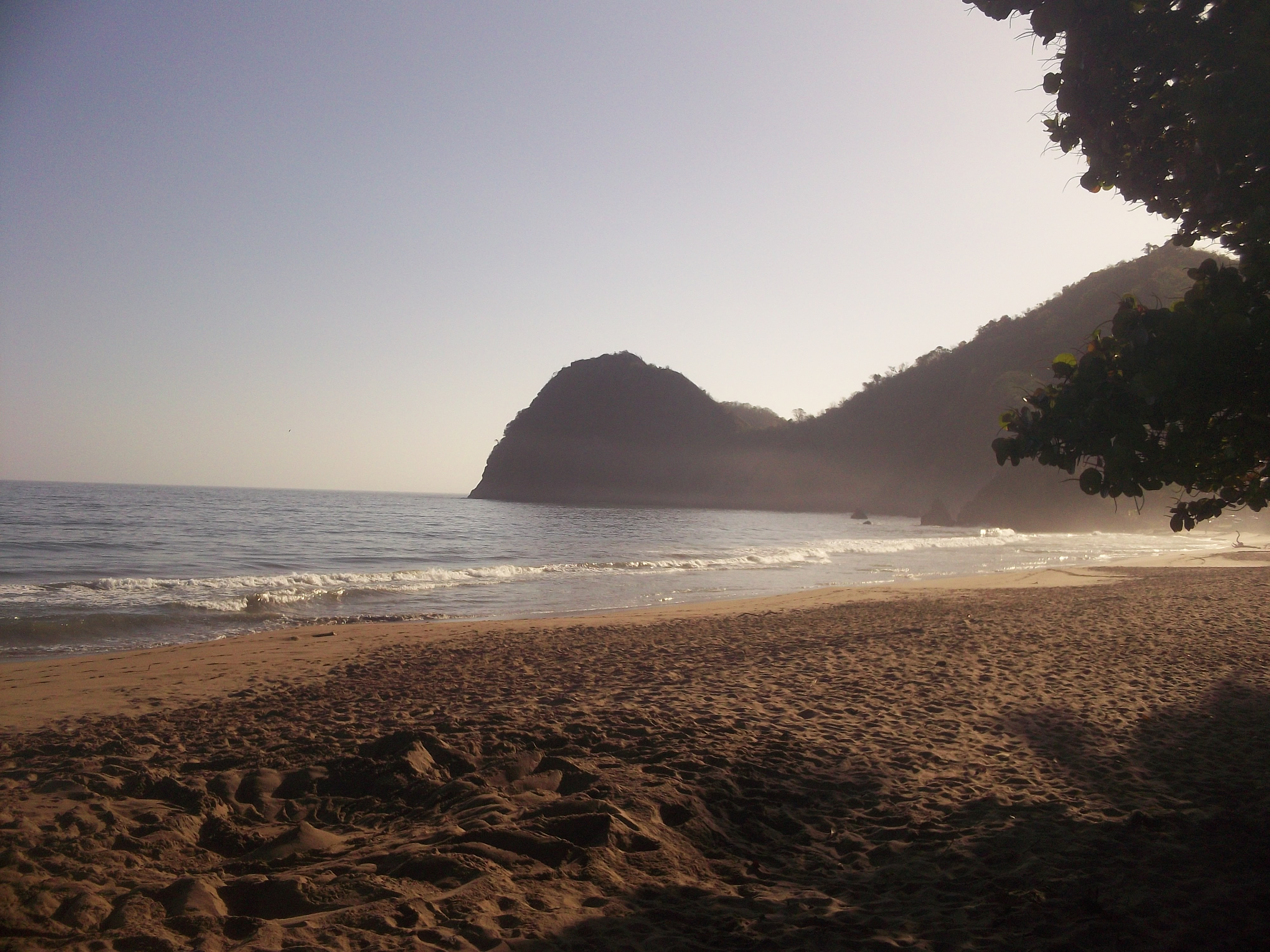
Querepare Beach, Sucre

Araya's beaches are preferred for windsurfing, favoured by the constant winds, and inns have been established in their vicinity. The swampy plain is ideal for walks through the waterways, leaving from the Ajíes wharf or from Iraq mainly. The diversity and abundance of bird life offer conditions for birding in all national parks and outside of them; such is the case in Chacopata Bay.

The thermal waters between Cariaco and Casanay have been used and conditioned as spas, including Poza Azul and Poza Cristal, in the vicinity of Cariaco. Adjacent to the BuenaVista lagoon is the Aguas de Moisés complex; the sulphur springs of El Pilar, Cachamaure around San Antonio del Golfo and Aguas Calientes in Santa Ana.

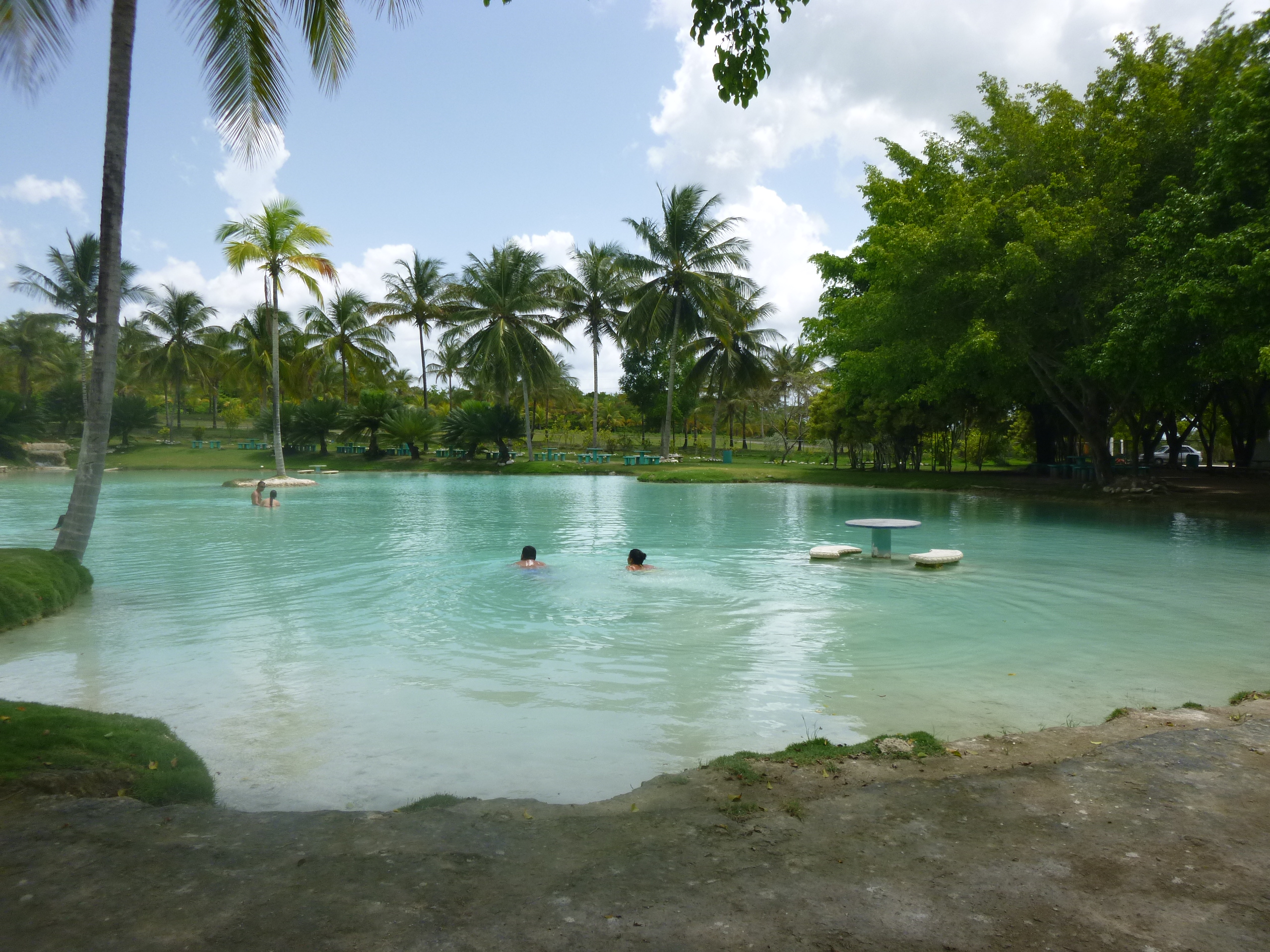
Las Aguas de Moisés, Sucre

== Transport ==
The access to Sucre state is done in a west–east direction through the trunk 9, which connects Caracas-Barcelona-Puerto La Cruz with the following cities in Sucre Cumaná, Casanay, Carúpano, El Pilar and Güiria. Through the Trunk Road 10, in the north–south direction, it links with Maturín and Puerto Ordaz, the capital of Monagas and the main city of the state of Bolivar, respectively. It has two national airports: Cumaná and Carúpano. There is another one located at Güiria, which by 2005 was inactive and only functioned as a point for fuel supply to helicopters. Puerto Sucre, in the city of Cumaná, is one of the three national maritime connection points with Margarita Island, the other two are in La Guaira and Puerto La Cruz. Ferries and other boats that arrive at the port depart from this maritime terminal to Punta de Piedras, on Margarita Island, and Araya, a town located on the peninsula of the same name in the northwestern end of Sucre State. Another ferry service departs from Güiria on the route Trinidad-Saint Vincent-Barbados-Saint Lucia.

== Gastronomy ==
Sucrense's gastronomy is influenced by the contributions of Trinidad and France through immigrants from the neighboring island and Corsicans. This is how to find particular dishes such as calalú de Paria and grouper corbullón, whose name derives from the term francéscourt-bouillon.

They are famous for the Cumanese gofio, made with ground cassava, sugar, cinnamon, clove and fruit juice; the chorizo carupanero; the banana and coconut pâté, which are wheat flour pasties filled with banana and coconut jelly, among others. Eastern region such as the zazi empanada and the fish sancocho. In addition, it finds components from all over the northeast region and Guiana like cassava.

Of special significance is the talkari of Indian origin, which crossed the Gulf of Paria due to the proximity of the island of Trinidad, where the British employed abundantly. The talkarí of Güiria, prepared with the help of Indian labour, has an undeniable reputation.

== Notable people ==
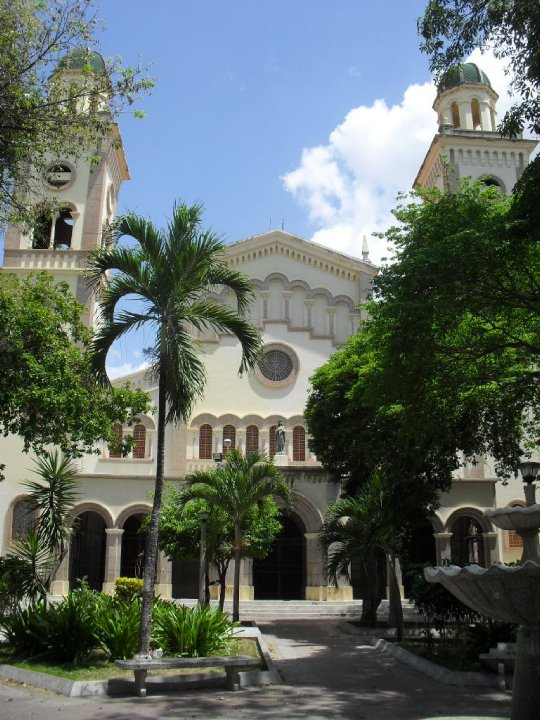
Santa Rosa Catholic Cathedral, Carupano

- Antonio José de Sucre "Gran Mariscal de Ayacucho"
- Audelino Moreno, officer and diplomat
- Cruz Salmerón Acosta, poet
- Andrés Eloy Blanco, poet
- Gualberto Ibarreto, singer
- Eladio Lárez, TV host
- José Antonio Ramos Sucre, poet
- Francisco Sánchez, swimmer
- Irene Esser, Miss Universe 2012, second runner up
- Wolfgang Larrazábal, rear admiral, president of Venezuela (1958)

== Gallery ==
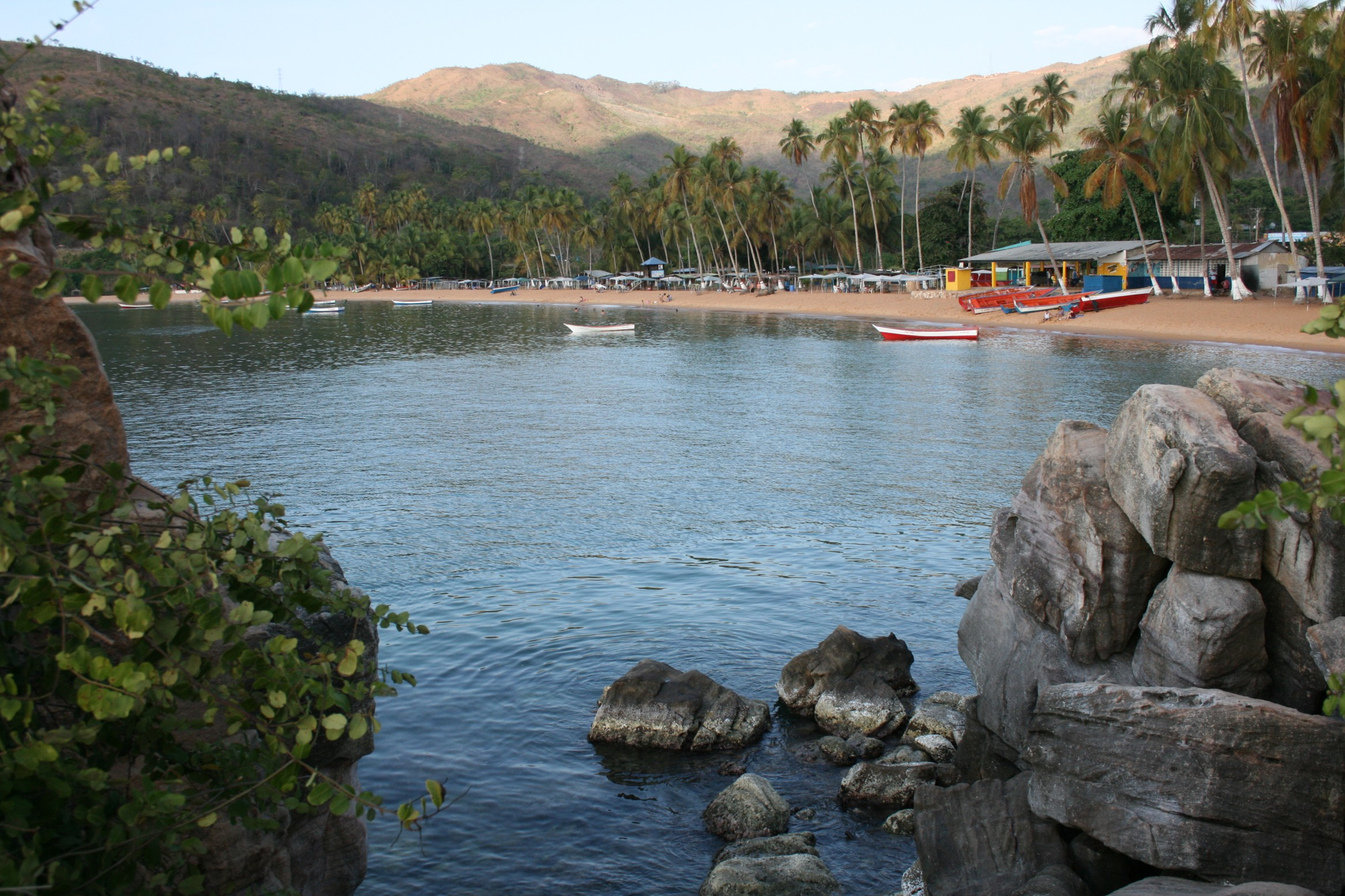
View of Playa Colorada

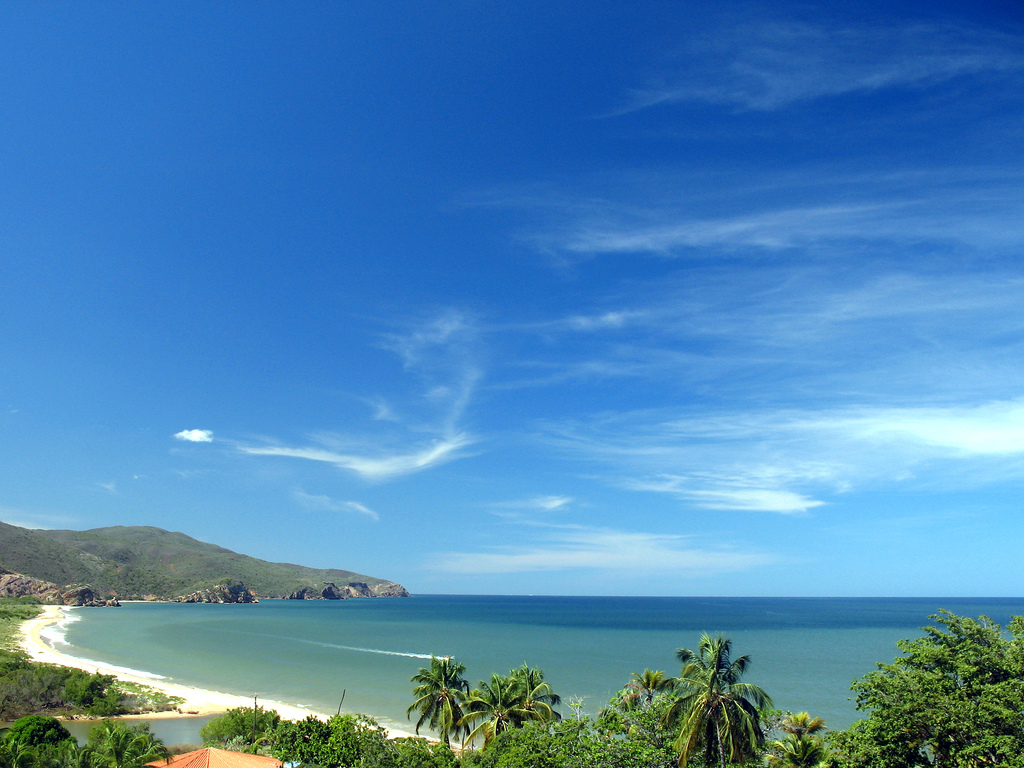
Beach of Cumaná

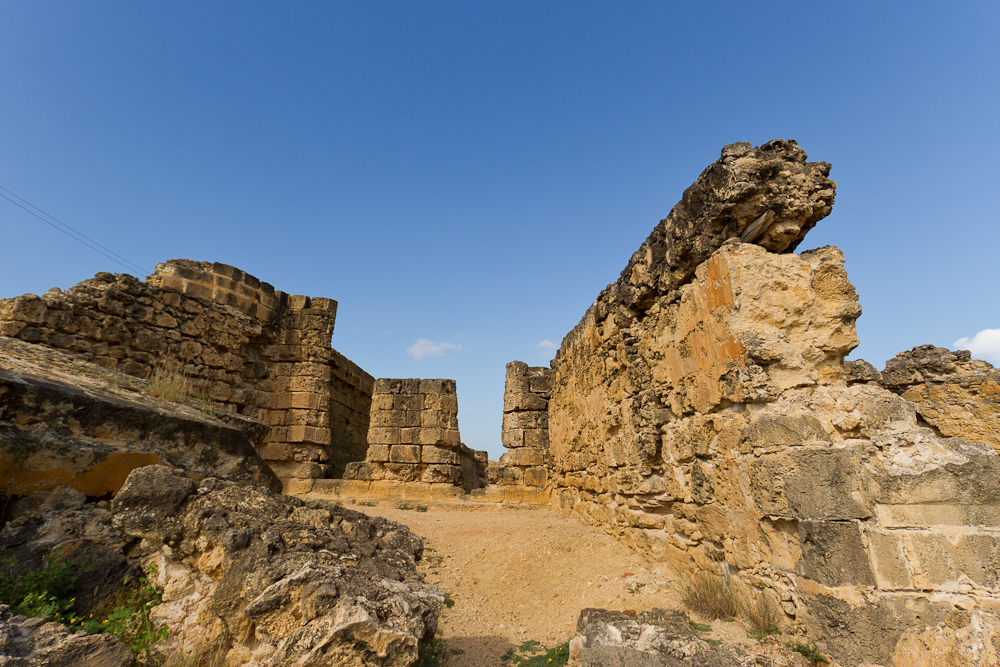
Castle of Araya

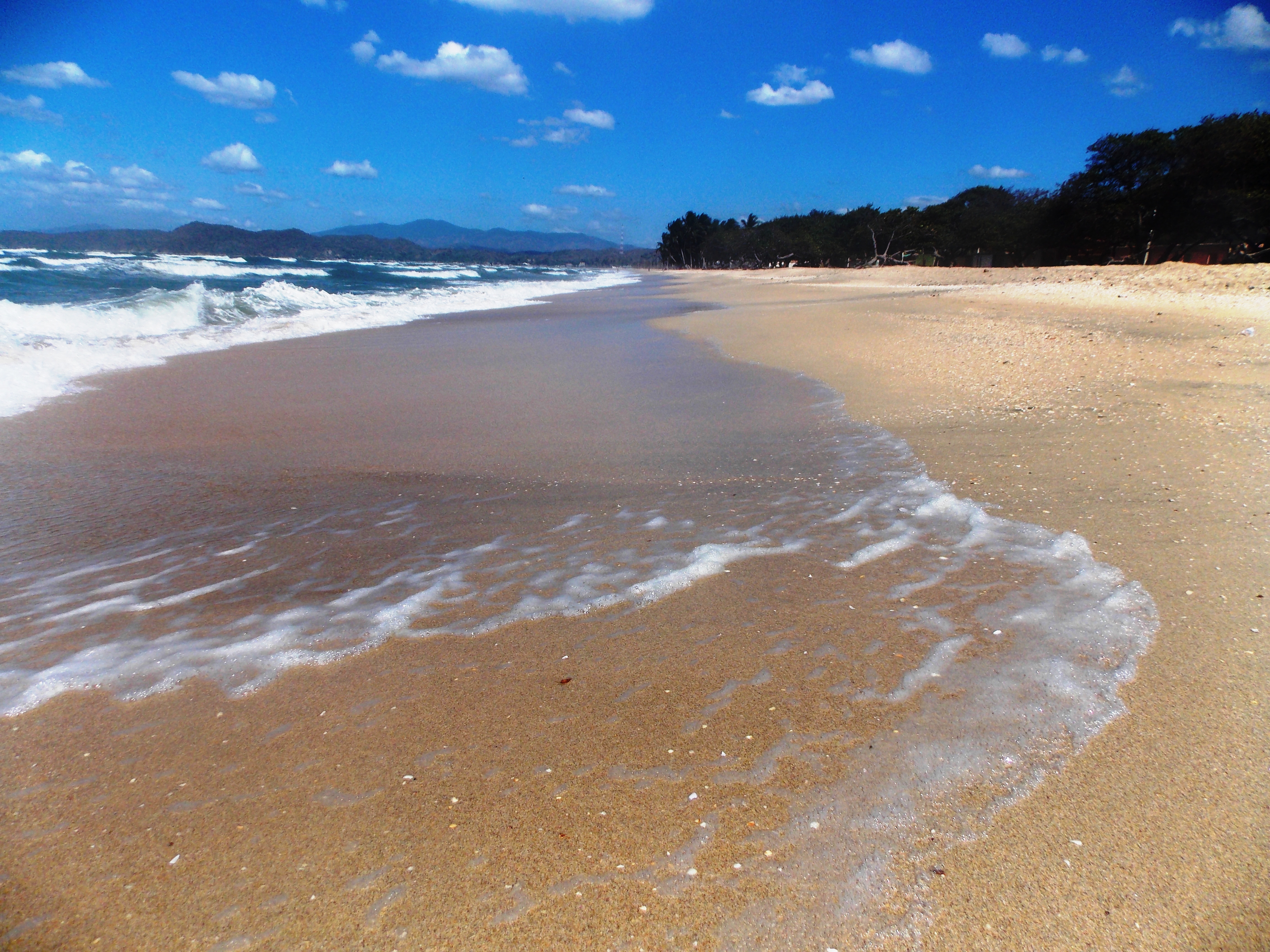
Uvero Beach

== See also ==
- States of Venezuela
