= Cumanacoa =

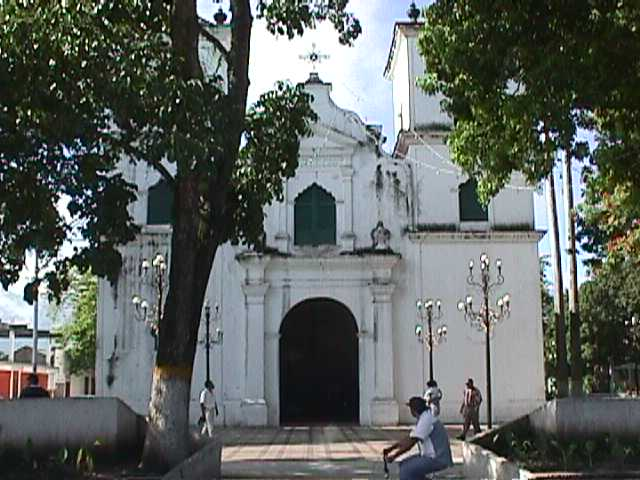
- Cumanacoa church

- Location within Venezuela
- Coordinates: 10°15′2″N 63°55′11″W
- Country: Venezuela
- State: Sucre
- Municipality: Montes
- Time zone: UTC-4:30 (VST)
  - Summer (DST): UTC-4:30 (not observed)
- Postal code: 6106

Cumanacoa is a town in the state of Sucre, Venezuela. It is the capital of the Montes Municipality.

In 2012 Hurricane Isaac caused heavy rain in the area and the Manzanares River overflowed its banks in the town of Cumanacoa inundating approximately 1,200 homes many of which were damaged and a few destroyed. Some residents had to be airlifted to safety. Similar flooding occurred elsewhere in the country, such as in Caracas where 40 families had to be evacuated.
