= Montes Municipality =

Montes Municipality Municipio Montes
- Municipality
- Location in Sucre

- Location in Venezuela
- Coordinates: 10°14′02″N 63°53′09″W
- Country: Venezuela
- State: Sucre

Area
  - Total: 1,080 km^{2} (420 sq mi)
- Time zone: UTC−4 (VET)
- Website: Official website

Montes is a municipality of Sucre, Venezuela. It has six parishes, and the municipal seat is in Cumanacoa. As of 2021, it has a population of 69,696.
