= Mejía Municipality =

Mejía Municipality Municipio Mejía
- Municipality
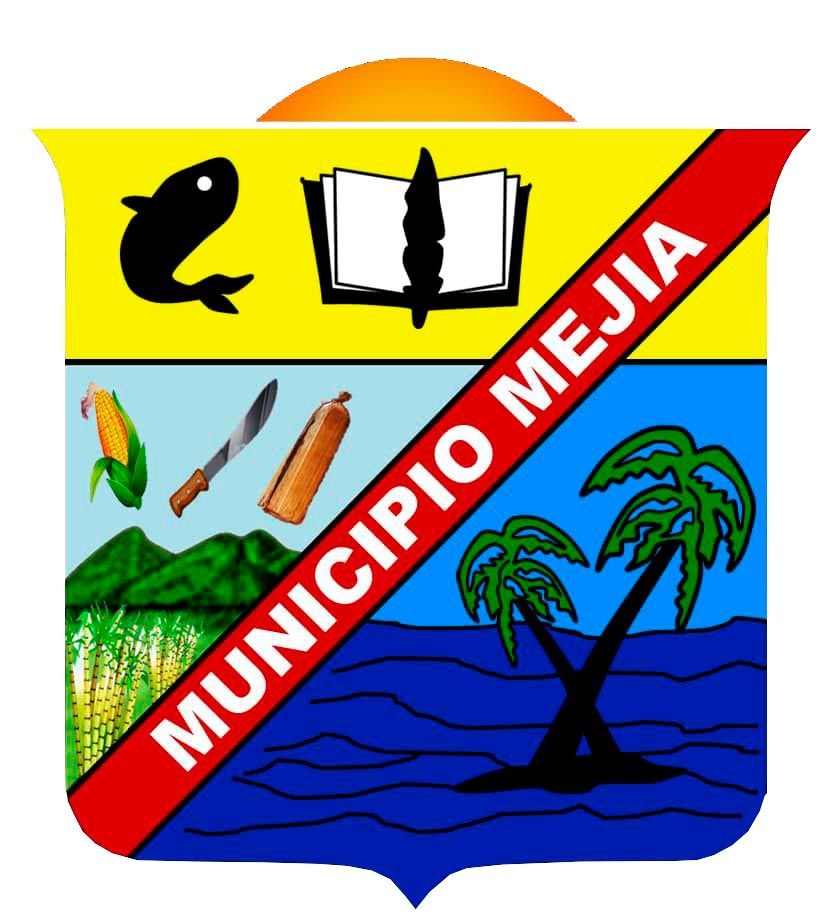
- Coat of arms

- Location in Sucre

- Location in Venezuela
- Coordinates: 10°22′11″N 63°48′22″W
- Country: Venezuela
- State: Sucre
- 18,144
- Time zone: UTC−4 (VET)

Mejía is a municipality of Sucre, Venezuela. Its only parish, San Antonio del Golfo, is also the municipal seat. As of 2021, it has a population of 18,144.
