= CARIACO Ocean Time Series Program =

In 1995, the Ocean Time Series Program called CARIACO (Carbon Retention in a Colored Ocean) was initiated, completing 232 monthly core cruises through January 2017. This time series consists of field observations using ship, mooring, and satellite platforms in the eastern Cariaco Basin at 10°30’N, 64°40’W. The program seeks to understand the relationship between surface primary production, physical forcing variables like the wind, and the settling flux of particles in this unique location.

Ship observations
Monthly oceanographic cruises are conducted on board the R/V Hermano Ginés of the Fundación La Salle de Ciencias Naturales de Venezuela. The cruises serve to collect hydrographic, nutrient and carbon concentration, primary productivity and other biogeochemical observations throughout the entire water column (surface to 1300m) (Astor et al., 2003; Astor et al., 2005; Muller-Karger et al., 2001; Muller-Karger et al., 2009). Additionally, seasonal cruises to the CARIACO station are conducted to examine chemical and microbial processes (Scranton et al., 2006; Taylor et al., 2006).

Moorings
A sediment trap mooring, consisting of five sediment traps (located at depths of 150, 275, 400, 800, and 1200 m), is also deployed near the study site. This mooring collects the downward flux of particulate material (Thunell et al. 2000; Thunell et al., 2007), derived both from the primary production at the surface and the terrestrial material from the mainland.

Satellite observations
The remote sensing component of the CARIACO Oceanographic Time Series Program is based on real-time and historical satellite measurements (Muller-Karger et al., 2005). The satellite data helps observe surface variations in sea surface temperature (SST) and ocean color, which include chlorophyll and river plumes.

Since it was initiated, this program has been supported by the National Science Foundation (NSF). It has also been supported by the National Aeronautics and Space Administration (NASA) and the Fondo Nacional de Investigaciones Cientificas y Tecnologicas (FONACIT, Venezuela).

All data generated by the CARIACO program are available via the project web page.
