= Libertador Municipality, Sucre =

Libertador Municipality Municipio Libertador
- Municipality
- Coat of arms

- Location in Sucre

- Location in Venezuela
- Coordinates: 10°34′58″N 63°00′34″W
- Country: Venezuela
- State: Sucre

Area
  - Total: 237 km^{2} (92 sq mi)
- Time zone: UTC−4 (VET)
- Website: Official website

Libertador is a municipality of Sucre, Venezuela. The capital is Tunapuy.
