= Tunapuy =

Town in Sucre State, Venezuela

- Location within Venezuela
- Coordinates: 10.5734°N 63.1066°W

Tunapuy is a town in Sucre State, Venezuela. It is the capital of the Libertador Municipality, Sucre.
