= San Antonio del Golfo =

- Coordinates: 10°26′N 63°47′W

Population
  - Total: 18,144

San Antonio del Golfo is a town in Sucre State, Venezuela. It is the capital of the Mejía Municipality. As of 2021, it has a population of 18,144.
