= Cariaco Basin =

Geographic feature in Venezuela

- Cuenca Cariaco
- Location of the basin offshore Venezuela

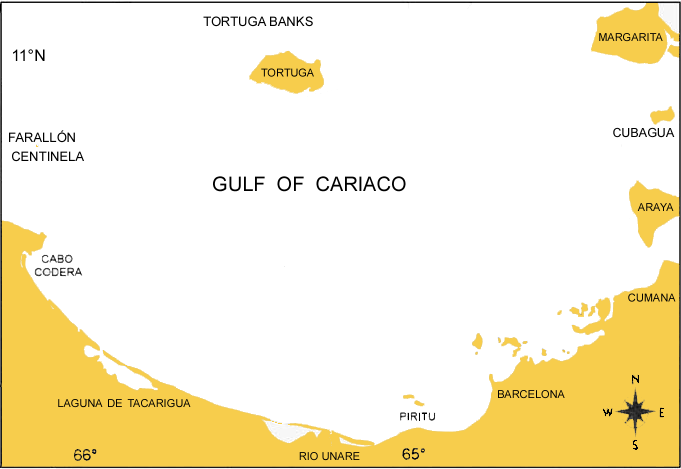
- Cariaco Basin, Venezuela
- Coordinates: 10°30′N 65°10′W
- Etymology: Gulf of Cariaco
- Location: Caribbean Sea
- Country: Venezuela

Characteristics
- On/Offshore: Offshore
- Boundaries: Margarita Island, Cubagua, Araya Peninsula, Tortuga Island, Tortuga Banks, Cape Codera, Farallón Centinela, Venezuelan coast

Hydrology
- Seas: Gulf of Cariaco; Caribbean Sea

Geology
- Basin type: Pull-apart basin
- Plate: Caribbean
- Age: Early Miocene-Holocene

The Cariaco Basin lies off the north central coast of Venezuela and forms the Gulf of Cariaco. It is bounded on the east by Margarita Island, Cubagua Island, and the Araya Peninsula; on the north by Tortuga Island and the Tortuga Banks; on the west by Cape Codera and the rocks known as Farallón Centinela; and on the south by the coast of Venezuela.

== Description ==
The Cariaco Basin is an east-west trending pull-apart basin, formed between two major overlapping right-lateral strike-slip faults, the San Sebastián and El Pilar faults, located on the continental shelf off the eastern coast of Venezuela. It is a deep depression composed of two sub-basins, the eastern basin and the western basin, each of about 1,400 metres (4,600 ft) depth, separated by a saddle of approximately 900 metres (3,000 ft) water-depth. To the south, the basin confines with the wide (~50 km) Unare Platform.

It is connected to the open Caribbean Sea through two shallow (around 140 metres (460 ft)) channels, to the north the (Tortuga Channel) and to the west the (Centinela Channel). Water circulation inside the basin is restricted, which, combined with the high annual primary productivity of the region (~500 gCm^{−2}yr^{−1}), causes the basin to be permanently anoxic, below ~250 m. This naturally occurring anoxic basin allows for sediments to be deposited without bioturbation, forming varves of alternating light and dark color, which correspond to the dry or rainy season. Its unique geography and undisturbed sediment record provides an excellent history of tropical climate change and is particularly sensitive to shifts in the Intertropical Convergence Zone (ITCZ) and has been the subject of extensive paleoclimatological research, amongst other sedimentological studies, geochemical studies, with alkenones, Mg/Ca, and micropaleontological, with foraminifera, pollen and spores, dinocysts and coccoliths.

=== Anoxic basin ===
Because of its anoxia, the Cariaco Basin has also a unique chemistry. Bacteria inhabit both the oxic and anoxic portions of the water column, with a maximum around the interface where oxygen disappears. This 'interface' oscillates between 200 and 300 meters. As such a unique location, the Cariaco Basin has been the site of a variety of studies since the mid-1950s. Since 1995, an international (Venezuela and United States) program has expanded the research in the basin. The CARIACO (Carbon Retention in a Colored Ocean;) program consists of a time series station in the eastern deep of the basin which is visited on a monthly basis to collect hydrographic, nutrient and primary productivity measurements. A suite of other measurements, including a sediment trap mooring, microbiological studies and current measurements are also conducted at this site. The work that has resulted from the CARIACO ocean time series program has demonstrated that this anoxic basin is quite dynamic and has helped understand the paleoclimatic record stored in the basin's sediments.

=== Ecology ===
The Cariaco Basin is an example of upwelling zone ecosystems. The seasonal upwelling cycle and sea surface temperature changes are linked to the intensity of the trade winds, and cause events of high primary production that support a very high biomass of plankton, fish, and marine birds and mammals. The seasonal productivity drives the abundance of sardines and attract dolphins. The waters are also home to several species of whales (such as rorquals and humpback), and orcas.

== Development ==
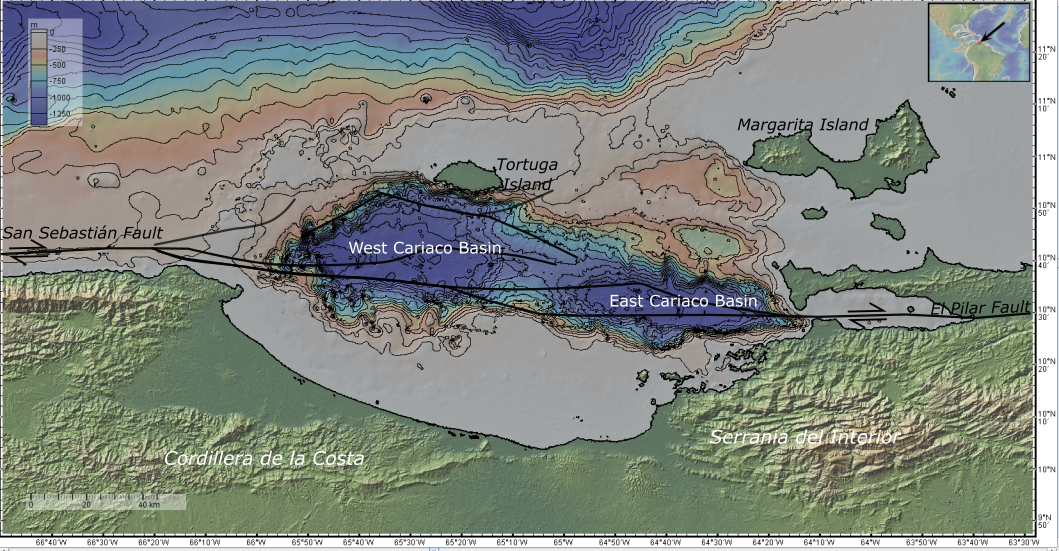
Bathymetric map of the Cariaco Basin, showing main faults

The formation of the basin has been studied using a combination of seismic reflection data, allowing identification of the main fault strands, and borehole data enabling the dating of the main sedimentary horizons identified on the data. The western sub-basin was first to form, as a pull-apart between the northern strand of the San Sebastián Fault and the El Pilar Fault, during the middle to late Miocene epoch. At the start of the Pliocene epoch, the northern strand of the San Sebastián Fault became inactive as a new southern strand formed linking directly to the El Pilar Fault. The new fault geometry led to the formation of a new pull-apart, generating the eastern sub-basin, which remains active to the present day.

== See also ==
- Cariaco
- Eastern Venezuela Basin
