= 2026 Venezuela earthquakes =

M7.2 and M7.5 doublet earthquake

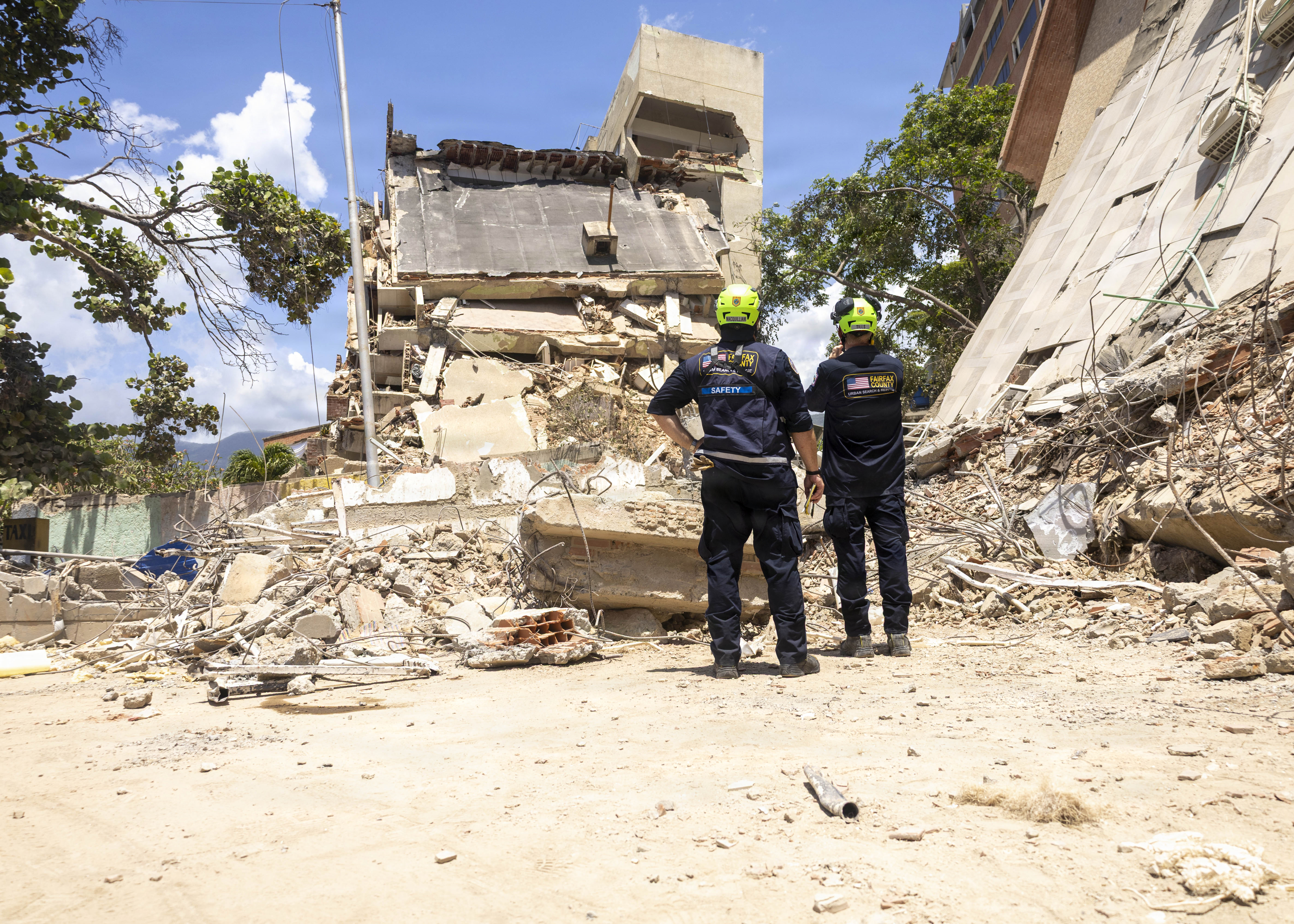
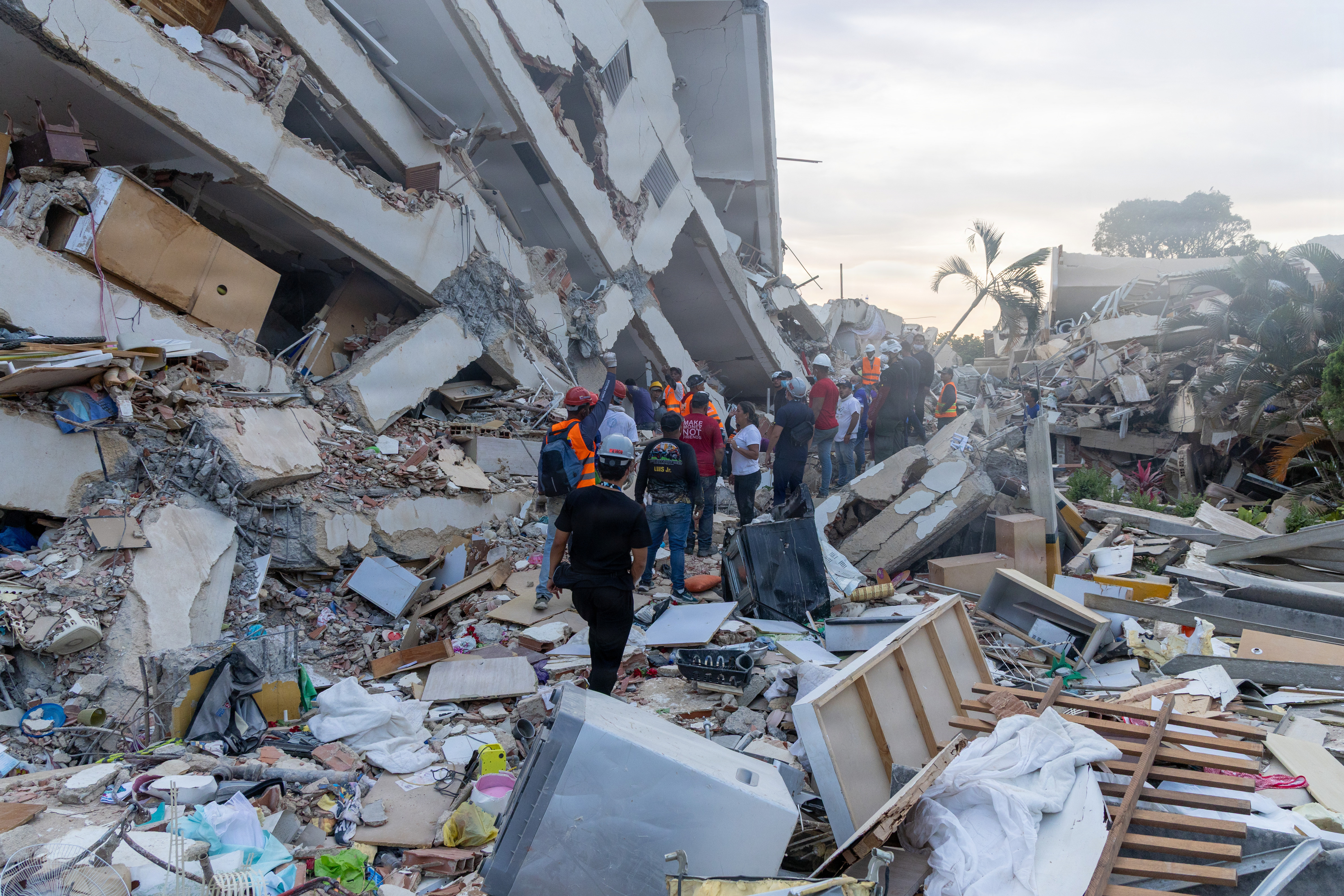
- Clockwise from top left: Rescuers at the collapsed building in La Guaira; U.S. Navy and Venezuelan military personnel unload aid supplies for those affected; Damaged buildings in La Guaira; A Venezuelan citizen holds the Venezuelan flag in a collapsed building; Buildings in the "Hugo Chávez" urban development affected in Catia La Mar, La Guaira; Search and rescue teams at the destroyed buildings in La Guaira

- UTC time: Doublet earthquake: A: 2026-06-24 22:04:33; B: 2026-06-24 22:05:03
- ISC event: A: 645904538; B: 645903460
- USGS-ANSS: A: ComCat; B: ComCat
- Local date: 24 June 2026
- Local time: A: 18:04:33 VET (UTC-4); B: 18:05:03 VET (UTC-4)
- Duration: ~90–120 seconds
- Magnitude: A: M_{w} 7.2 and M_{w} 7.5 (USGS); B: M_{w} 7.6–7.8 (INGV and GEOSCOPE) (Note: According to the United States Geological Survey's analysis, there were two separate earthquakes, separated by about 40 seconds. Others, like the GEOSCOPE Observatory and the INGV, have analyzed the event as a single earthquake with complex seismology, lasting for about two minutes.)
- Depth: 10 km (6 mi)
- Epicenter: 10.435°N 68.472°W; 10.605°N 67.217°W
- Fault: San Sebastián fault system
- Type: Strike-slip, supershear
- Areas affected: Venezuela
- Total damage: US$37 billion (estimated direct damage)
- Max. intensity: MMI IX (Violent)
- Peak acceleration: 0.912 g
- Peak velocity: 202 cm (80 in)/s
- Tsunami: 4 cm (1.6 in)
- Aftershocks: 1,115+ (as of 8 July 2026) mb 5.0 on 24 June 2026 (strongest)
- Casualties: at least 6,509 dead, 226,696 injured, c.18,100–50,000 missing (Note: Sources vary regarding the number of missing due to a lack of precise official figures. Some say as low as 18,100 while others go as high as 50,000.)

On 24 June 2026, doublet large strike-slip earthquakes affected northwestern and central Venezuela. The epicenter of the first earthquake was in Veroes Municipality, west of San Felipe, the capital city of Yaracuy. This earthquake, which measured M_{w} 7.2, occurred at 18:04 VET and was classified as a foreshock. It was followed by a M_{w} 7.5 mainshock 30 seconds later centered off the coast of La Guaira, west of Catia La Mar. The two earthquakes caused widespread damage across the country, particularly in the capital Caracas and especially the state of La Guaira, where 80% of buildings collapsed. As of August 2026, at least 6,500 fatalities were officially confirmed, about 226,700 were injured or hospitalized, and tens of thousands still remain missing. Analysis by independent sources suggest a death toll far exceeding the official figure.

The United States Geological Survey (USGS) Prompt Assessment of Global Earthquakes for Response (PAGER) system predicted the death toll could be significantly higher than the initial reports, potentially exceeding 10,000. The mainshock was the strongest in Venezuela since the 1900 San Narciso earthquake.

== Tectonic setting ==
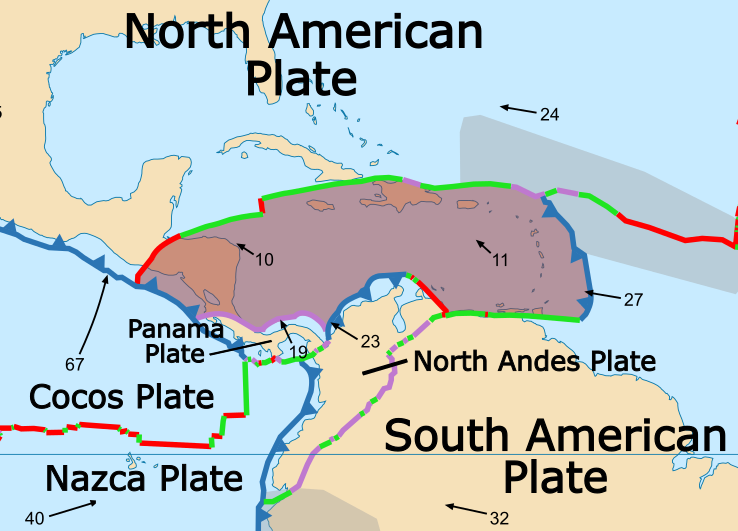
Tectonic setting of Venezuela, between the Caribbean plate, the North Andes, and the South American plate

Northern Venezuela lies within a broad, transpressional boundary zone between the Caribbean plate and the South American plate rather than along a single fault. Its principal active structure is the Boconó–San Sebastián–El Pilar fault system, with slip transferred farther east through the Los Bajos Fault and onto the Warm Springs Fault near Trinidad. It is a compressional and right-lateral strike-slip system that extends for more than 1,300 km (810 mi) from the Venezuelan Andes to Trinidad and accommodates much of the dextral motion between the Caribbean and South American plates at about 10 mm (0.39 in) per year.

The 24 June 2026 doublet earthquake occurred within this plate-boundary zone near the San Sebastián fault system. The USGS located the M_{w} 7.2 foreshock near Yumare and the M_{w} 7.5 mainshock in the Caribbean Sea, northwest of Caracas. The USGS described the mainshock as shallow strike-slip faulting near the complex plate boundary along the San Sebastián fault system. This is consistent with the regional tectonic setting of east–west-trending right-lateral faults in northern Venezuela. The Boconó and San Sebastián faults were previously identified as potential sources of future large earthquakes. The Boconó Fault, which last ruptured in 1812, has accumulated a slip deficit that could be released as a magnitude 7.0–7.6 earthquake. Machel Higgins, a geophysicist at Florida International University, said the San Sebastián Fault was capable of producing a magnitude 7.1 earthquake.

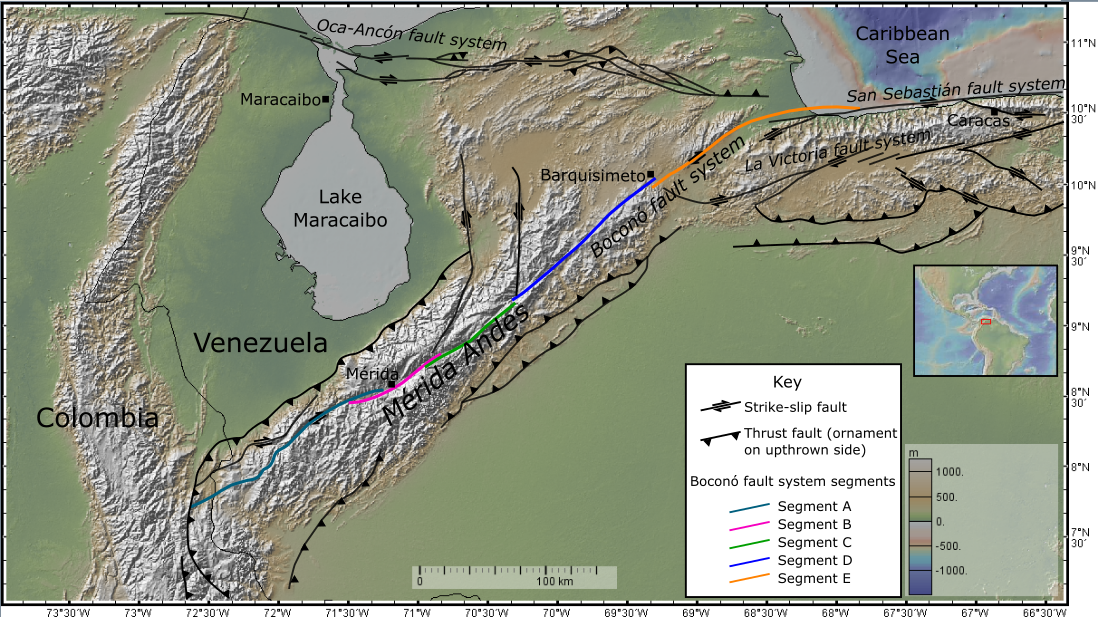
Segments of the Boconó Fault and San Sebastián Fault systems

The San Sebastián Fault is mostly offshore along north-central Venezuela, north of the Venezuelan Coastal Range. A short onshore segment near Simón Bolívar International Airport is also known as the Bruscas Fault. Farther east, the San Sebastián and El Pilar faults are separated by the Cariaco pull-apart basin. The offshore San Sebastián and El Pilar faults comprise 400 km (250 mi) of the total length of the plate boundary from longitudes −68° to −64°.

The same plate-boundary system has been associated with several large historical earthquakes in northern Venezuela, including events in 1641, 1766, 1812, 1900, and 1967. A 2015 marine seismic study attributed the M_{w} 7.6 1900 San Narciso earthquake to a rupture on the eastern San Sebastián Fault. The 1900 rupture source may have been east of Maiquetía and along the northern margin of the Cariaco Basin, between the ruptures of the 1812 Caracas and 1853 Cumaná earthquakes.

== Earthquakes ==
USGS ShakeMaps of the M7.2 and M7.5 events
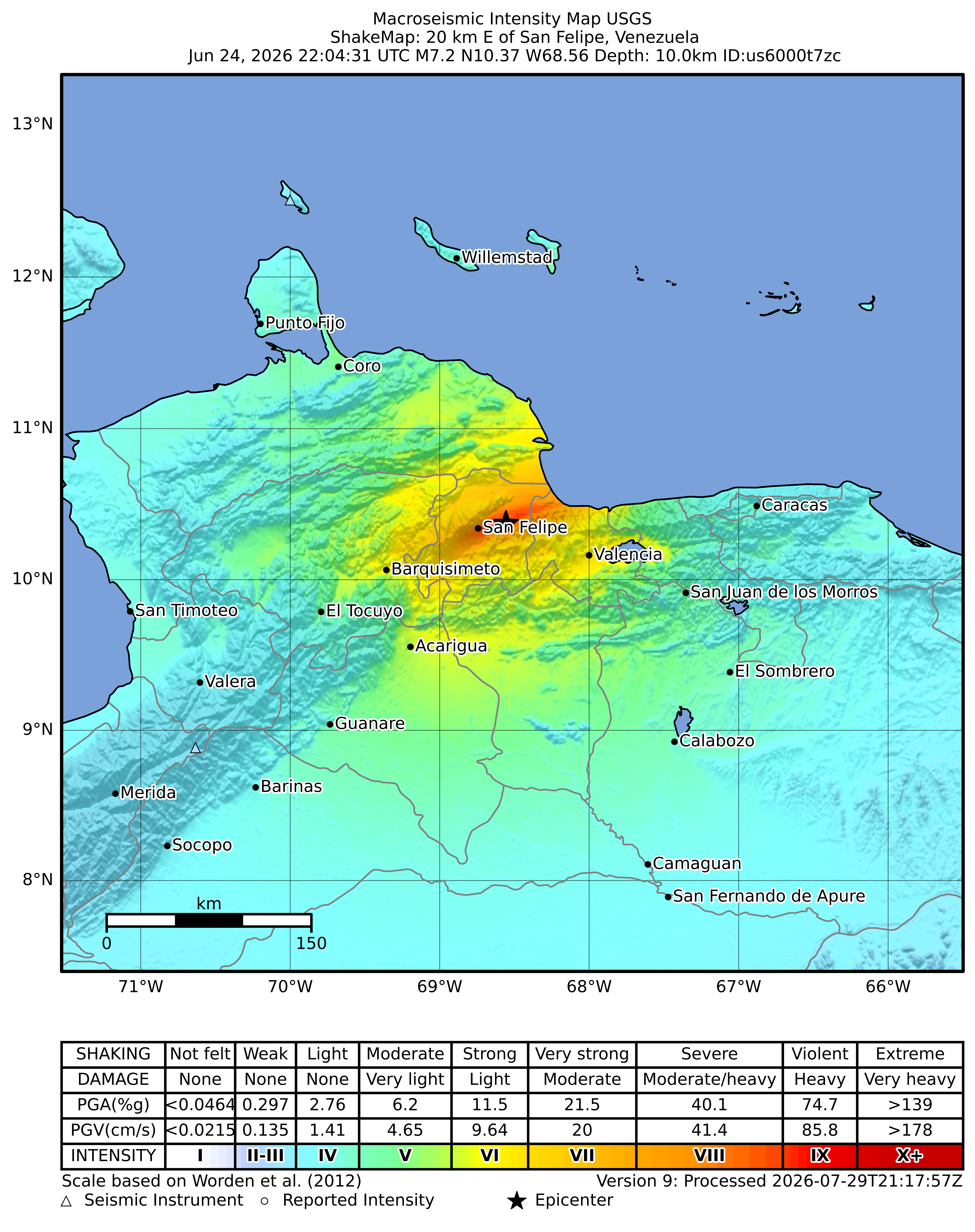
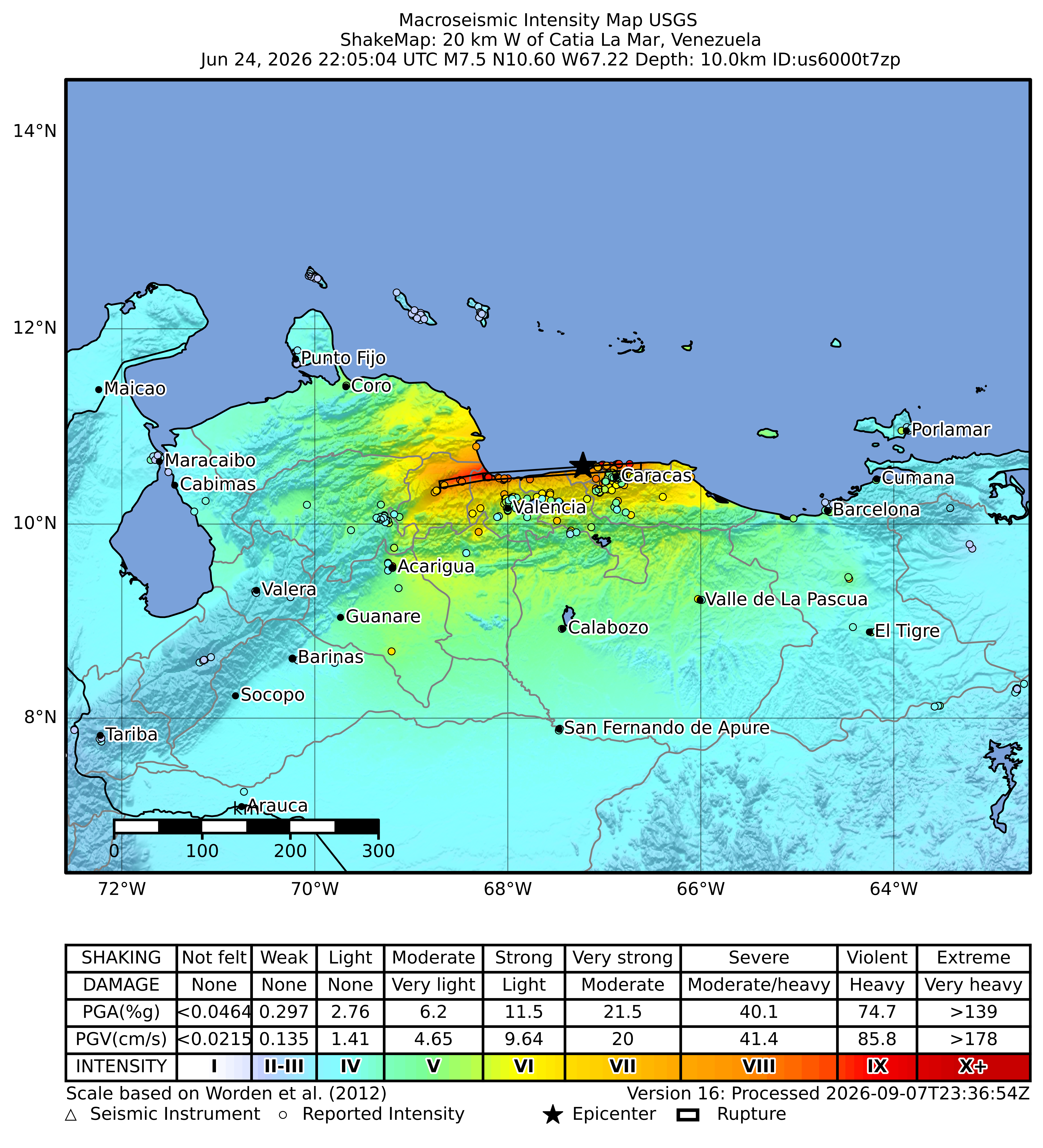

The first shock was an M_{w} 7.2 earthquake east-northeast of Yumare at 22:04 UTC and a depth of 10 km (6.2 mi). It was caused by right-lateral strike-slip faulting on an east–west trending fault. The GFZ Helmholtz Centre for Geosciences (GFZ) catalogued the foreshock at M_{w} 7.3 and a depth of 12 km (7.5 mi).

Thirty seconds later, a M_{ww} 7.5 shock struck about 100 km (62 mi) east of the first event at a depth of 10 km (6.2 mi). The epicenter of the first earthquake is in the Veroes municipality in the state of Yaracuy. The second quake was centered off the coast of La Guaira state near Catia La Mar. This earthquake was caused by either right-lateral strike-slip faulting on an east–west trending fault or left-lateral strike-slip faulting on a north–south striking fault. The USGS said that it likely ruptured along the San Sebastián Fault, with slip confined to a 175-by-20-kilometre (109-by-12-mile) area. The GFZ reported this earthquake as M_{w} 7.4 and placed the epicenter northwest of Caracas. The GFZ's focal mechanism indicated right-lateral strike-slip faulting on an east–west trending fault. This mainshock is the largest in Venezuela since 1900, when a magnitude 7.7 earthquake struck northeast of Caracas.

The GEOSCOPE Observatory only reported one M_{w} 7.8 earthquake with an epicenter area close to that of the USGS event epicenters, lasting for about two minutes. The focal mechanism solution provided by the agency indicated right-lateral strike-slip faulting that initiated at a depth of 12 km (7.5 mi).

Italy's National Institute of Geophysics and Volcanology (INGV) published an earthquake finite fault model describing slip along the fault based on analysing surface displacement data from ESA's Sentinel-1 Earth-observation satellite. According to the model, the rupture involved an east–west trending, north-dipping fault. Because ground deformation data collected for both earthquakes were indistinguishable, the INGV's model combined them into a single event measuring M_{w} 7.6 containing two episodes of high energy release. Slip occurred along a 210 by 30 km (130 by 19 mi) section of the fault extending from near Morón to northeast of Caracas. The rupture initiated near Morón, which corresponded with the first earthquake; this event produced up to 2.5 m (8 ft 2 in) of slip at a depth of 20 km (12 mi). The INGV estimated that rupture propagated towards Caracas at a velocity of 3–3.5 km (1.9–2.2 mi) per second. A second episode of energy release occurred 30 to 40 seconds later, corresponding to the second earthquake and representing the greatest energy release phase. The second event was associated with a maximum slip of 3.6 m (12 ft) offshore, north of Catia La Mar, at a depth of 11.1 km (6.9 mi).

USGS fault slip distribution and surface projection
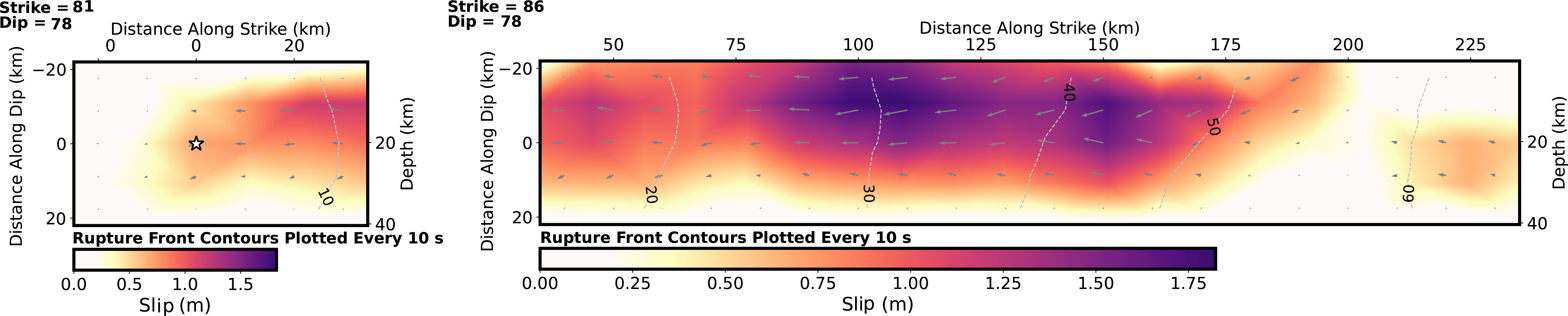
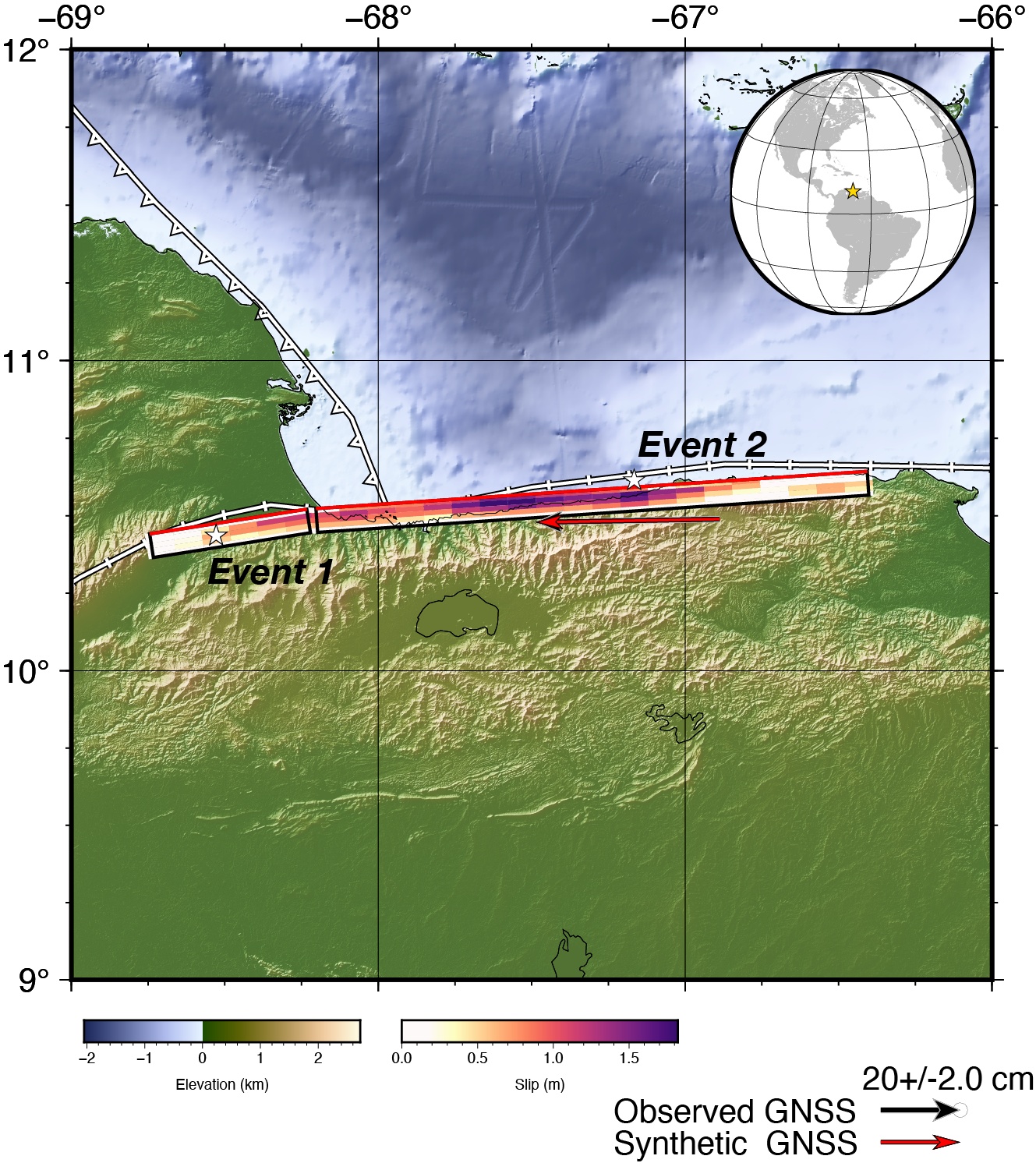

The USGS modelled two fault segments with a combined dimension of about 230 by 40 km (143 by 25 mi) and combined magnitude of 7.54, representing both events. These segments dipped 78 degrees south. Most of the rupture occurred west of the hypocenter of the first event, which ruptured a ~40 km (25 mi) east–northeast onshore portion of the fault. An east–west trending, offshore, 180 km (110 mi) fault rupture represented the second earthquake. Slip on the longer east–west segment was greater; more than 1 m (3 ft 3 in) of slip occurred for most of its length, peaking at 1.8232 m (5 ft 11.78 in) in a region west of the fault. Around the hypocenter, the slip also peaked at 1.5811 m (5 ft 2.25 in). The zone of greatest slip (>1 m (3 ft 3 in)) occurred at depth from west of Veroes Municipality to Simón Bolívar International Airport, a distance of about 200 km (120 mi). The earthquake sequence lasted about 70 seconds.

Seismologists at Peking University modelled one M_{w} 7.61 earthquake at a depth of 10 km (6.2 mi) rupturing in an asymmetric bilateral way across a 210 by 40 km (130 by 25 mi) area. The earthquake propagated mainly eastwards with slip concentrating at shallow depths along the fault. Most of the slip occurred at 60–130 km (37–81 mi) east of the epicenter, peaking at 4.49 m (14.7 ft) some 70 km (43 mi) away; the model also indicated a significant vertical slip component in addition to the strike-slip motion. The greatest energy release occurred some 20–80 seconds after the rupture initiated, but continued for 90 seconds.

Seismic networks in Alaska, Europe, and the western United States which recorded ground motion indicated evidence of supershear rupture velocities of 4 to 5 km (2.5 to 3.1 mi) per second, far exceeding the local shear wave velocity of 3.2 to 3.8 km (2.0 to 2.4 mi) per second in the area. Supershear rupture is inferred to have initiated 150 km (93 mi) from the initial epicenter, or within the first 30 to 35 second of the rupture.

Six aftershocks were felt in Caracas within two hours of the mainshock. According to Fundación Venezolana de Investigaciones Sismológicas, 1,115 aftershocks were recorded from the time of the earthquakes to 8 July. These aftershocks mainly occurred in Yaracuy, Carabobo, Aragua, Miranda and La Guaira. The largest aftershock occurred at 22:54 UTC on 24 June and measured mb 5.0.

A tsunami advisory was issued for the Dominican Republic, Puerto Rico and the Virgin Islands following the earthquakes, but was later rescinded. A 4 cm (1.6 in) high tsunami struck Isla de Mona and Yabucoa, Puerto Rico, while a 2 cm (0.79 in) high surge was detected at Fort-de-France, Martinique.

=== Ground motion ===
No strong-motion instruments recorded the mainshock within 10 km (6.2 mi) of the rupture; the nearest records were obtained in Caracas, about 12 km (7.5 mi) from its surface projection. An international consortium of researchers from the University of Chile, Stanford University, City St George's, University of London and the University of Concepción reconstructed the shaking in Caraballeda from two closed-circuit television cameras, in a study published in The Seismic Record. They tracked the frictional sliding of a roadside traffic post and checked the result against the independently tracked swaying of a nearby light pole. It estimated a short, intense near-fault velocity pulse oriented roughly north–south, approximately perpendicular to the fault, with a peak ground velocity of about 202 cm/s (80 in/s) in its strongest horizontal direction. Within the NGA-West2 global strong-motion database, only two records from the 1999 Jiji earthquake exceed this value. The footage shows eight buildings beginning to collapse almost simultaneously at the end of the pulse.

Shaking was also felt in Bogotá, northeastern Colombia, and northern Brazil, including in Manaus, Belém and Macapá, triggering evacuations. Tremors were also felt in the ABC islands (Aruba, Bonaire and Curaçao), in parts of the Dominican Republic, including Santo Domingo, and in Puerto Rico. In Trinidad and Tobago, coastal uplift of up to 20 ft (6.1 m) was observed in Galfa Point, along the southwestern peninsula of Trinidad.

== Casualties ==
CCTV footage of the second earthquake in La Pastora Parish, Libertador Bolivarian Municipality

Security camera footage of the earthquake in Caraballeda, La Guaira, capturing extreme shaking and multiple building collapses

Foreign casualties or dual citizens by country
Country	Deaths	Missing
Argentina	6	3
Brazil	2	
Chile	4	
China	9	
Colombia	24	
Cuba	1	
France (Note: The majority also held Venezuelan citizenship.)	45	50
Dominican Republic	1	
Ecuador	3	
Italy	16	
Peru	3	7
Portugal	100	59
Spain	40	138
United States	3	12
Uruguay	1	

According to official government figures released on 24 August, at least 6,509 people died and 226,696 were injured or hospitalized. Tens of thousands were displaced; more than 16,300 people who lost their homes, and another 28,300 whose homes were uninhabitable.

There were claims that the true death toll is likely higher than the official figure. On 4 August, José Alejandro Terán, the governor of La Guaira, reported that 7,265 people died and 1,579 others were missing, though the national government did not reflect this. No official death toll update have been released by the government since late August, even though bodies continue to be recovered in La Guaira as recent as end-September.

Journalists from The New York Times suggest the official death toll was a severe undercount. The agency said that about 5,200 people were living in 16 public housing apartments in Caraballeda when they collapsed. Although not all these residents were inside the buildings when they collapsed, many inside were unable to escape in time before collapse. Data from Copernicus, a satellite, indicate more than 700 buildings were destroyed, far higher than the figure provided by the Venezuelan government which was 190. A separate assessment by The New York Times showed that 656 buildings and 370 homes were completely or partially destroyed.

Many people remained missing a month later, although the exact number remains debated. A crowdsourced database, Venezuela Reporta, created by a Miami-based Venezuelan, estimated that 41,300 people were missing, nearly all of them in La Guaira, while international sources and the United Nations estimated that the total number of missing persons still buried beneath collapsed buildings on 18 July could range between 40,000 and 50,000. The website Venezuela Looks for You said 18,100 people were missing as of 7 July. On another tracking persons website, Desaparecidos Terremoto Venezuela, approximately 29,000 people were reported missing as of 3 August. United Nations under-secretary-general for humanitarian affairs and emergency relief coordinator Tom Fletcher also said that more than 50,000 people remained missing on 27 June. No official missing figures were put out by the Venezuelan government, with National Assembly president Jorge Rodríguez saying it was to avoid speculation. An initial figure of 157 was reported by the government on 25 June, but that number was never updated. More than 100 Venezuelans who arrived in La Guaira aboard a deportation flight by the United States Immigration and Customs Enforcement went missing after their hotel collapsed. According to El País, at least 32 deportees were killed. By late August, only 30% of collapsed buildings in La Guaira had been searched, with many bodies still yet to have been recovered.

More than two hundred foreigners were identified among the dead, including 2 Brazilians, 4 Chileans, 9 Chinese, 24 Colombians, a Cuban, a Dominican, 3 Ecuadorians, 16 Italian-Venezuelans, and a Uruguayan. Portugal also confirmed that 100 citizens died, including at least 59 with Venezuelan citizenship, while 59 others were missing. Forty-five French citizens died and another 50 were missing. In addition to 40 deaths, Spanish foreign minister José Manuel Albares also said 138 citizens were missing. The Argentinian government said 6 citizens had died and 3 were missing. A spokesperson for the Trump administration said 3 Americans were among the dead and 12 were missing. Peru's foreign ministry confirmed 3 Peruvian citizens had died and 7 were missing.

Initial casualty reports remained scarce, particularly in more remote areas. This is believed to be due to disrupted communications or a possible media blackout in Venezuela. Since 24 June is a national holiday in Venezuela, commemorating the 1821 Battle of Carabobo, many people were at home instead of at work when the earthquakes struck.

=== Casualty estimates ===
According to the USGS PAGER service, "high casualties and extensive damage are probable and the disaster is likely widespread". For the M_{w} 7.5 earthquake, PAGER estimated a 18% probability of 1,000 to 10,000 deaths, a 43% probability of 10,000 to 100,000 deaths, and a 38% probability of more than 100,000 deaths. For the M_{w} 7.2 foreshock, PAGER estimated a 33% probability of 1,000 to 10,000 deaths, a 41% probability of 10,000 to 100,000 deaths, and a 17% probability of more than 100,000 deaths. (Note: Both of these estimates consider each earthquake independently, without regard for the effect of one earthquake's predicted damage on the other's.) Based on an assessment of seismic modelling, satellite imagery and population data, the United Nations Development Programme estimated $4.7–8.7 billion in housing and economic damage, or about 6% of the nation's gross domestic product. This estimate did not include damage from infrastructure loss, long-term economic disruption, and reconstruction. They also estimated that 1.7 million buildings, including many in the worst-affected areas, were exposed to strong shaking. Upon anticipating a large number of deaths, the United Nations supplied 10,000 body bags.

Following discrepancies between government updates of the number of casualties, the Venezuelan Education-Action Program on Human Rights (PROVEA) called for independent verification and government transparency. According to PROVEA, a 27 June update placed the death toll at 1,430, and 24 hours later, updated that number with only 20 additional deaths. Another earlier update lowered the number of injured from 3,238 to 3,150. PROVEA added that the government figures "raise more doubts than they provide answers." On the contrary, sociologist David Smilde at Tulane University does not believe the government would underreport these figures, since there was already a large international response and the government could use them to appeal for more aid. Another sociologist and think tank founder, Rafael Uzcátegui, said the government was already rigged with inefficiency and favoritism, so managing a crisis is challenging.

On 29 June, when the death toll stood at 1,450, The New York Times said it may be a "substantial undercount", and it could take weeks to realize the true extent of destruction. Architectural engineering professor Emily So expected the toll to rise significantly after more bodies are removed from the rubble. This was based on interpreting the number of missing and widespread damage to infrastructure. Ilan Kelman, a professor of disasters and health at University College London, said there was a possibility the true number of fatalities may never be known. Additional deaths from injuries were also expected due to limitations with Venezuela's strained healthcare infrastructure. Contributing to the delayed response is a lack of machinery and medical supplies. Tens of thousands of people remained missing, according to an unofficial missing persons tracking website. These figures are not independently verified and may contain people who were separated from their families. However, according to Linda Hornisberger of REDOG, a Swiss search-and-rescue group, while communication may be difficult, it is not to the extent that making contact is impossible. Hornisberger suspected that most of the missing were already dead. The New York Times believed that it may take considerable time for a finalized death toll to be published, reminiscent of Hurricane Maria and the 2004 Indian Ocean earthquake and tsunami where governments spent a year updating figures.

=== Identification and funeral preparations ===
As hospital morgues were operating beyond capacity, many bodies were later taken to the La Guaira port which was converted into a makeshift mortuary for relatives—some of whom were still hospitalized for their injuries—to identify the dead. To delay the decomposition process, some bodies were coated in lime. There, a makeshift tent also served as an authorization center releasing death certificates and cremation approvals. Numerous private funeral homes began offering free funeral car services and cremations. Without proper record-keeping and identification protocols, relatives had to search in improvised morgues and refrigerator trucks in unhygienic conditions by themselves. Some families reported lost or misplaced bodies after they were identified which prevented burial or funeral processions. A forensic pathologist for the La Guaira port facility estimated that about 400 bodies are processed every day, many of them mangled beyond recognition. Due to the number of bodies, refrigerator trucks were overwhelmed and remaining bodies were laid outdoors and left to decompose. Some bodies had decomposed so much that they could only be identified by relatives through tattoos, dental records or clothes.

By 6 July, more than 2,200 bodies had been claimed by relatives and buried; another 200 remained unclaimed. Unclaimed bodies were buried in a cemetery at Catia La Mar, each marked by a cross, with identification plaques and forensic files for families to identify them in the future. La Guaira governor José Alejandro Terán said forensic experts from Servicio Nacional de Medicina y Ciencias Forenses and Cuerpo de Investigaciones Científicas, Penales y Criminalísticas were responsible for identifying the dead. Terán dispelled rumors on social media of mass graves for the dead. The burial site was in a mountainous area of the state, where bodies were placed in large trenches. An official in-charge of the cemetery said they had the capacity to hold 2,000 to 3,000 coffins.

=== Recovering bodies ===
Many volunteers and firefighter continued to look for the dead under collapsed apartment blocks after most rescue operations ended by burrowing tunnels through the concrete slabs. One volunteer at the site of the OPP 26 building collapse managed to find 12 bodies. Some said they were unable to recover their dead relatives from the rubble, and even after requesting for government assistance, did not get a response. One said to remove the bodies of his mother and brother, the latter's limbs had to be cut off. A firefighter in La Guaira said on July 7 that many bodies still buried beneath collapsed buildings would have decomposed so heavily that they would often disintegrate if personnel attempted to recover them. Some private crane owners were charging people up to US$3,000 a day to rent their equipment so bodies could be extracted.

=== Notable victims ===
- Yimvert Berroterán, Venezuelan footballer
- Yorgelis Delgado, Venezuelan actress
- Milagros Eulate, Venezuelan politician
- Gabriela Fleritt, Venezuelan actress, radio announcer and comedian
- María Clemencia López, Venezuelan diplomat and former chargée d'affaires
- Isabel Jara, Spanish-Venezuelan civil servant and institutional representative
- Richard Peñalver, Venezuelan politician
- Willner Rivas, Venezuela national volleyball team player
- Carlos Silva Amarista, Venezuelan engineer, president of the Caracas Metro
- Van Der Dijs, heavy metal rock band, all members (Manuel van Der Dijs, Gabriel Gómez, Xander Hernández, Abraham Foucault)

== Damage ==
Telesur reporting from San Bernardino, Distrito Capital

The earthquake collapsed nearly 800 buildings, of which 189 were completely leveled. Satellite imagery suggests that approximately 590,000 buildings were damaged across the country overall. Buildings collapsed in Caracas and the states of Trujillo, Carabobo, Aragua, Miranda, and La Guaira. The United Nations estimated that the earthquake caused US$4.7–8.7 billion worth of damage, roughly 4–8% of Venezuela's GDP, based on losses to housing and economic assets, adding that the true cost could be between 1.5 and 3 times that estimate.

The United Nations Office for Disaster Risk Reduction estimated that both earthquakes caused US$37 billion in direct damages. About US$24 billion in damage were to residential, commercial, educational, health, institutional and industrial buildings, or 3% of the total number of buildings exposed to shaking. Another US$13 billion in damage represented water and sanitation, telecommunications, roads, railways, energy, ports, airports, oil and gas infrastructure, or 4%. The estimate did not include indirect losses such as due to supply chain disruptions, social, environmental or economic effects, and reconstruction. Verisk Analytics estimated the economic loss to be in excess of US$10 billion.

The United Nations Development Programme estimated that 1.7 million buildings were exposed to Mercalli intensity VI (Strong) or higher intensities of shaking; 452,000 experienced VII (Very strong); 60,000 experienced VIII (Severe), and 5,000 experienced IX (Violent). About 38 hospitals across the country were also damaged.

=== Caracas ===
Collapsed and damaged buildings in Los Palos Grandes

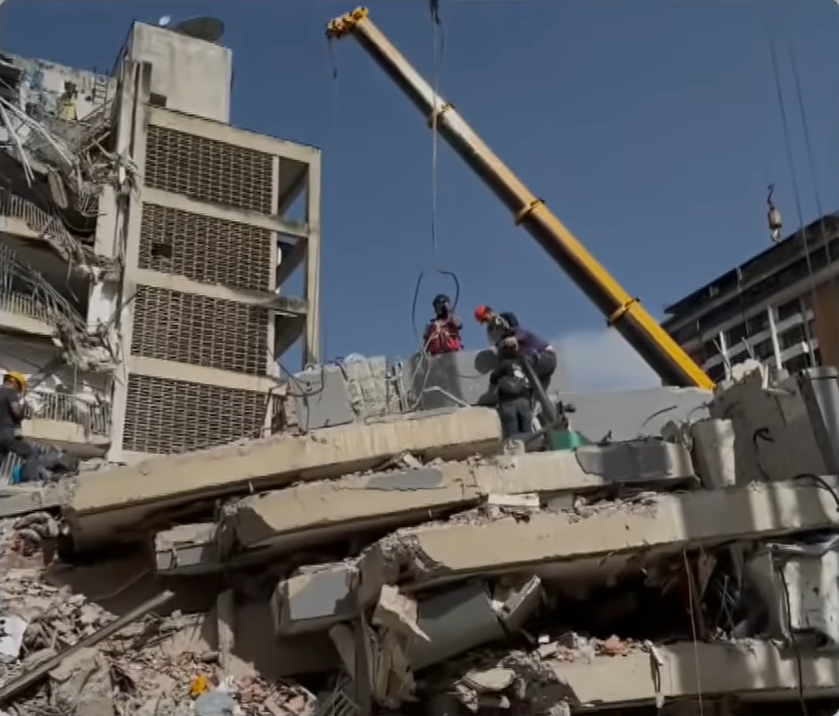
A collapsed building in Caracas

Interior Minister Diosdado Cabello said that the Los Palos Grandes and Altamira municipalities were the worst-affected parts of Caracas. At least four collapsed buildings in Caracas were residential high-rises. At the Petunia Residences in Los Palos Grandes, 14 floors partially collapsed, leaving only 6 floors intact. Three buildings collapsed in Altamira, including a 22-storey building that totally collapsed. Another 30 buildings in the district were heavily damaged. In an unspecified area in southeastern Caracas, almost all high-rise buildings were heavily damaged or destroyed, with many of them collapsing.

On 9 July, Carmen Meléndez, the mayor of Capital District, said 69 people died; 47 deaths occurred in San Bernardino parish of Libertador. In the eastern Caracas municipality of Chacao, the mayor, Gustavo Duque, said at least 58 people were killed and 26 people were rescued. Additionally, 100 buildings sustained minor to severe structural damage. Two buildings in the municipality also collapsed, with many people trapped under rubble. At least three people were killed after two structures collapsed in Baruta Municipality, and several were killed in a building collapse in Pinto Salinas.

Buildings housing the French embassy and the headquarters of the Venezuelan Red Cross Society were severely damaged. The collapse of the Rita building in San Bernardino Parish resulted in at least seven deaths. In La Pastora Parish, several homes, public infrastructure and religious buildings were damaged. A fallen cornice from one of these damaged buildings killed four people and injured several more. The Caracas Fire Department said at least 174 people where injured. They also estimated that more than 200 homes were damaged to varying degrees including partial collapses.

=== La Guaira ===
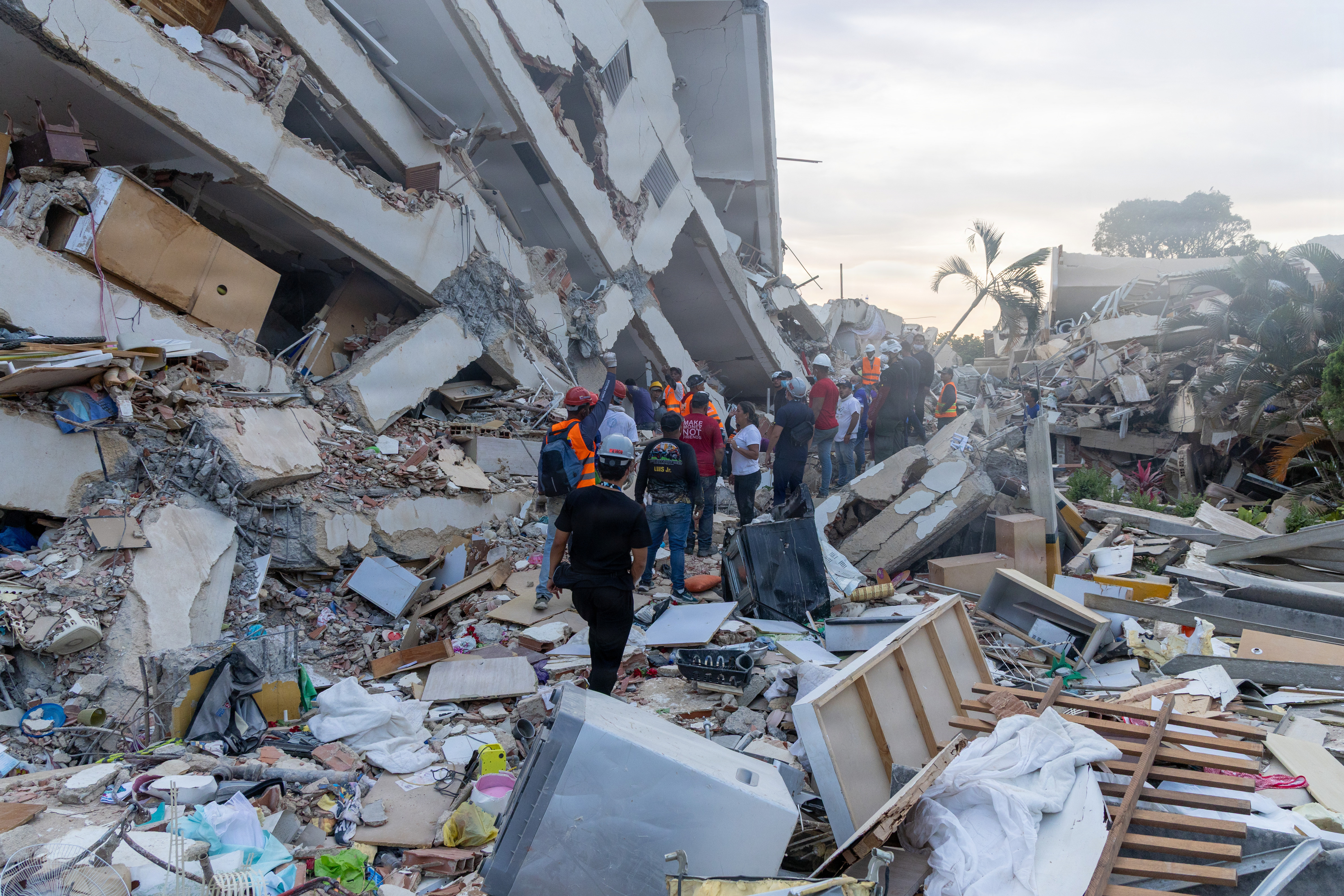
Venezuelan rescue teams at destroyed buildings in La Guaira

In La Guaira, the worst-affected state, north of Caracas, 80% of buildings collapsed, with officials reporting 1,400 destroyed structures. The government said nearly 200 buildings in the state collapsed, but satellite analysis indicated a greater number. According to Sentinel satellite imagery analyzed by NASA, more than half the buildings in Caraballeda, Macuto, Naiguatá, La Guaira and Catia la Mar had a damage probability of at least 75%. That approximated to almost 59,000 buildings damaged according to their analysis. Some of the rubble were also further damaged by fires.

The main airport serving the capital, Simón Bolívar International Airport, was heavily damaged. All flights departing from or arriving there were canceled. An independent database said more than 41,300 people were missing in the state alone. Venezuelan rescue teams reported that hundreds, possibly thousands of people still remained buried beneath collapsed structures as of 26 June. Images on social media showed dozens of buildings collapsed completely or partially. Those that remained standing sustained collapsed walls and shattered columns. Telecommunication services in the city were disabled. Video from a helicopter also showed many buildings flattened in the Playa Grande, Tanaguarenas and Los Corales neighbourhoods. In Los Corales, the Coral Park, Vallarta, Coral Mar and Coral Beach buildings were destroyed.

The Microsoft initiative, AI for Good Lab, said AI-based damage assessment tools estimated that nearly a third of Catia La Mar's 30,000 buildings were damaged. The heavy damage in Venezuela was attributed to substandard construction and collapse of older buildings. After the 1967 Caracas earthquake, the government revised its seismic codes, but such enforcements were never prioritized. According to Juan Carlos Vielma, a civil engineer, after the Vargas landslides of 1999, then-president Hugo Chávez's administration rushed to build housing for those displaced. Engineers also highlighted the construction of soft story buildings where there are fewer structural elements on the ground floor in favor of more open spaces or garages; such buildings are vulnerable to pancake collapses.

The state-run Hotel Santuario La Llanada, partially collapsed, trapping and likely killing most of its inhabitants including many repatriated citizens. Satellite imagery showed one section of the hotel reduced to rubble while another still intact. The Eduard's Hotel completely collapsed, trapping staff and families of some baseball players from Guerreros de Lara and Delfines de La Guaira. The relatives of Gorkys Hernández, Eliézer Alfonzo, and his son Eliézer Alfonzo Jr. were later found dead in the hotel ruins. Further from the coast, in Carayaca, a mixed-use residential building collapsed, killing 11 people. An administration building of the Military Academy of the Bolivarian Navy and another office collapsed, trapping several people. In Catia La Mar, a children's hospital collapsed, killing 16 children and injuring 35 others. During search and rescue operations, rescuers found that some buildings had styrofoam and concrete making up the walls.

=== Elsewhere ===
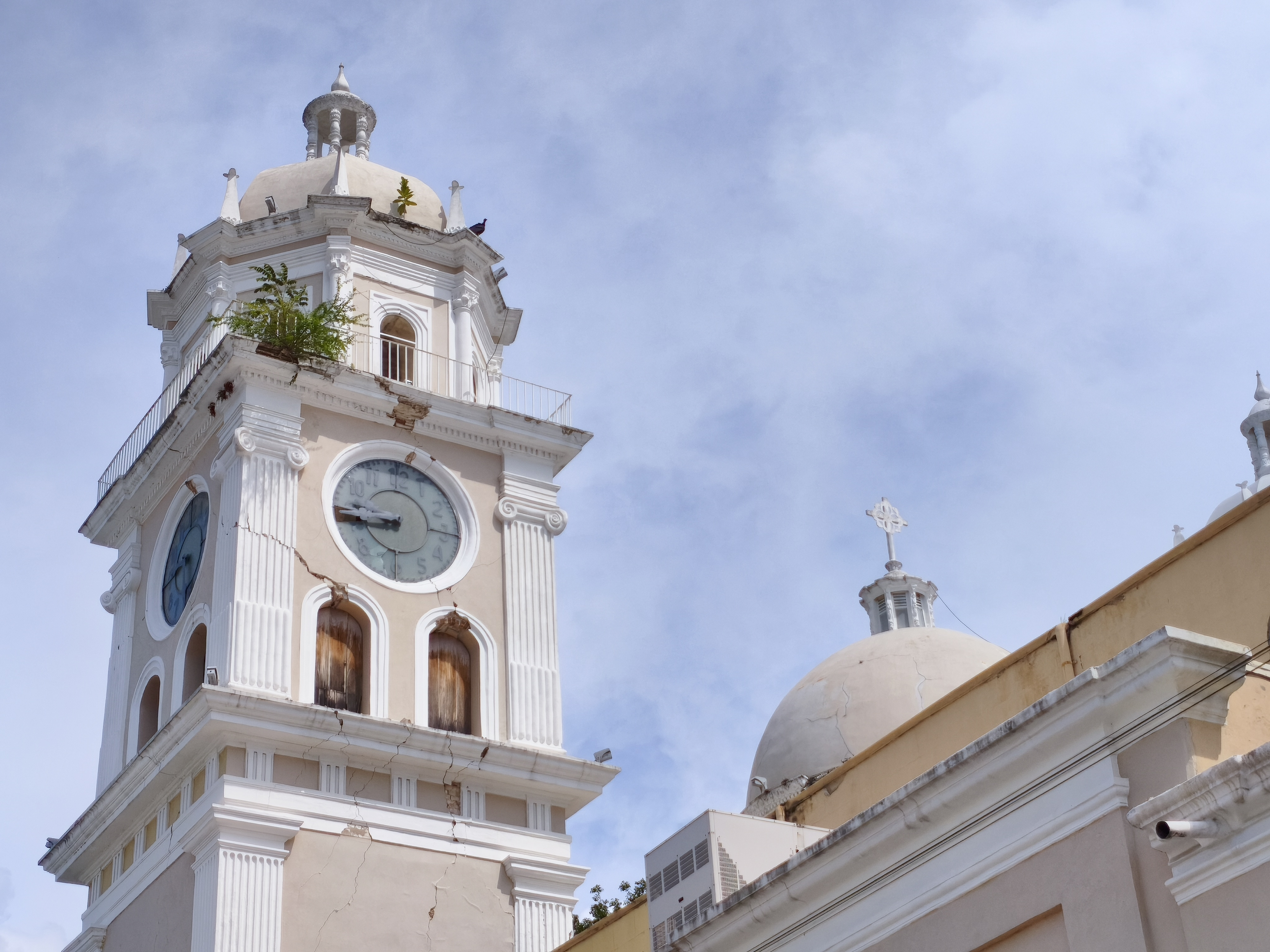
The Valencia Cathedral's clock tower following the earthquakes.

Closer to the epicenter, in the state of Carabobo, 19 people were killed, 67 were injured, 568 houses were destroyed and 787 others were damaged in Naguanagua, Juan José Mora, Puerto Cabello, and San Diego. Fifteen people died in Juan José Mora, one person died in Puerto Cabello, another died in Naguanagua, and 34 people were injured in Mariara. At least 40 people were treated for injuries in Puerto Cabello's Adolfo Prince Lara and Dr. Molina Sierra Social Security hospitals. More than 25 homes were destroyed in the Morón and Urama parishes, while some buildings in Puerto Cabello were damaged.

In Yaracuy state, where epicenter of the earthquakes are, 13 homes were heavily damaged in San Felipe, two buildings under construction collapsed in Cocorote, and cracks appeared in one home in Independencia. In Veroes, 25 homes collapsed and 35 others were badly damaged; in total, at least 2,686 homes were damaged out of an inspected 3,000.

At least 18 people were killed in Aragua; 16 in Santiago Mariño, and 1 each in Bolívar and Tovar municipalities. The collapse of one apartment in the Bosque Lindo housing complex of Santiago Mariño caused multiple deaths. Inspections by engineers later revealed that the three towers that did not collapse were unsafe for residents. The earthquake also displaced more than 700 people in the state.

Falcón governor Víctor Clark said 32 people were treated for injuries and 15 people were trapped under collapsed buildings. The collapse of the La Mar Suites in Tucacas, Falcón left 12 people dead and 33 injured. In Boca de Aroa parish, the earthquakes damaged 87 homes, affecting 252 residents. Eight housing complexes and two buildings were also damaged.

=== Other damage ===
An aftershock on 26 June caused additional damage to buildings in Caracas as well as the collapse of a bridge connecting the parish of Caraballeda to the rest of La Guaira, disrupting relief efforts. On 2 July, one death occurred outside a hospital in Zulia due to a falling façade. The hospital was already damaged by the earthquakes the week prior. Eight days after the earthquakes, a school in La Pastora Parish partially collapsed; one person was injured and four homes were evacuated due to damage from the collapse.

== Search and rescue ==
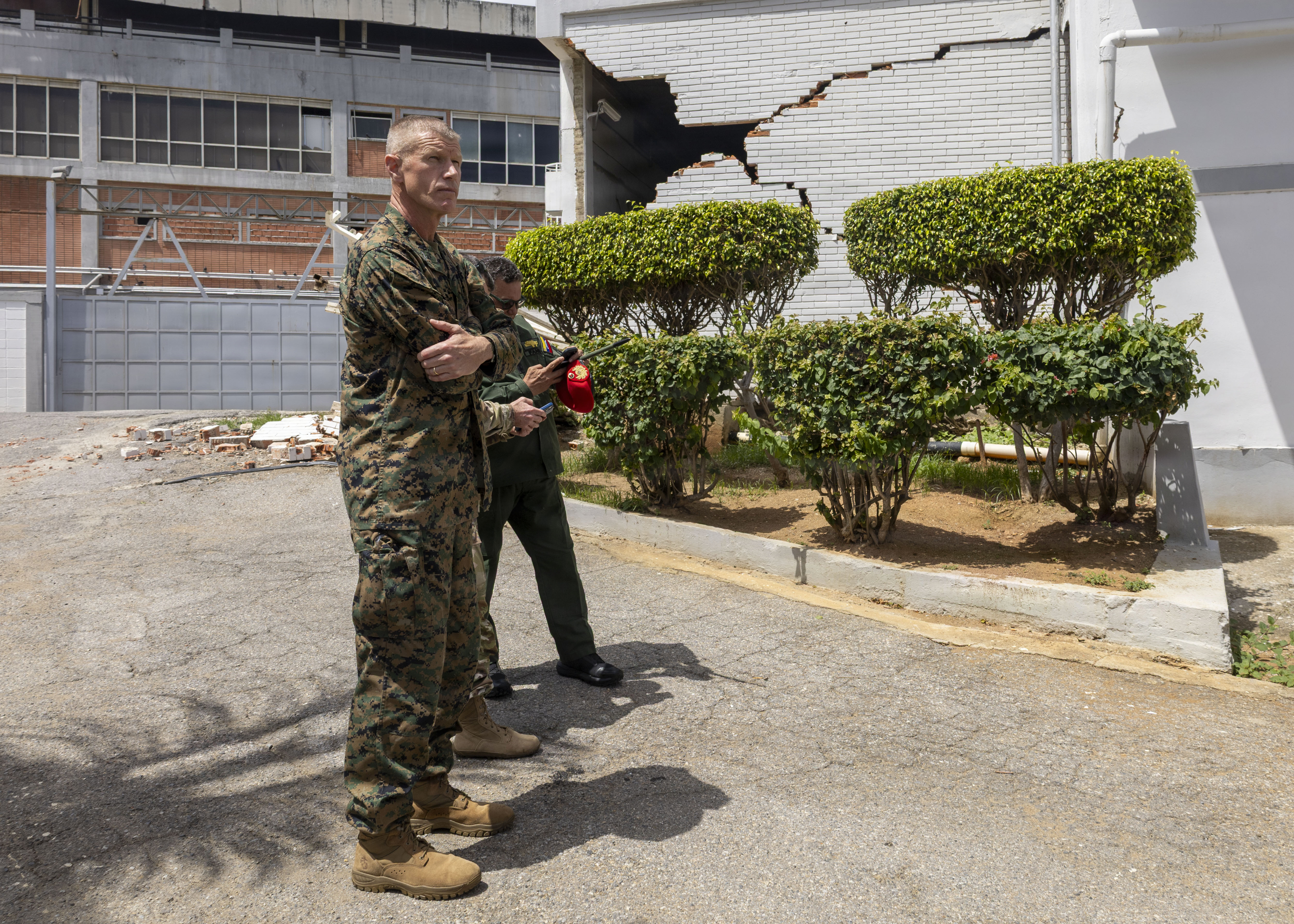
USMC Gen. Kevin Jarrard surveys damage at Simón Bolívar Airport in Maiquetía, La Guaira

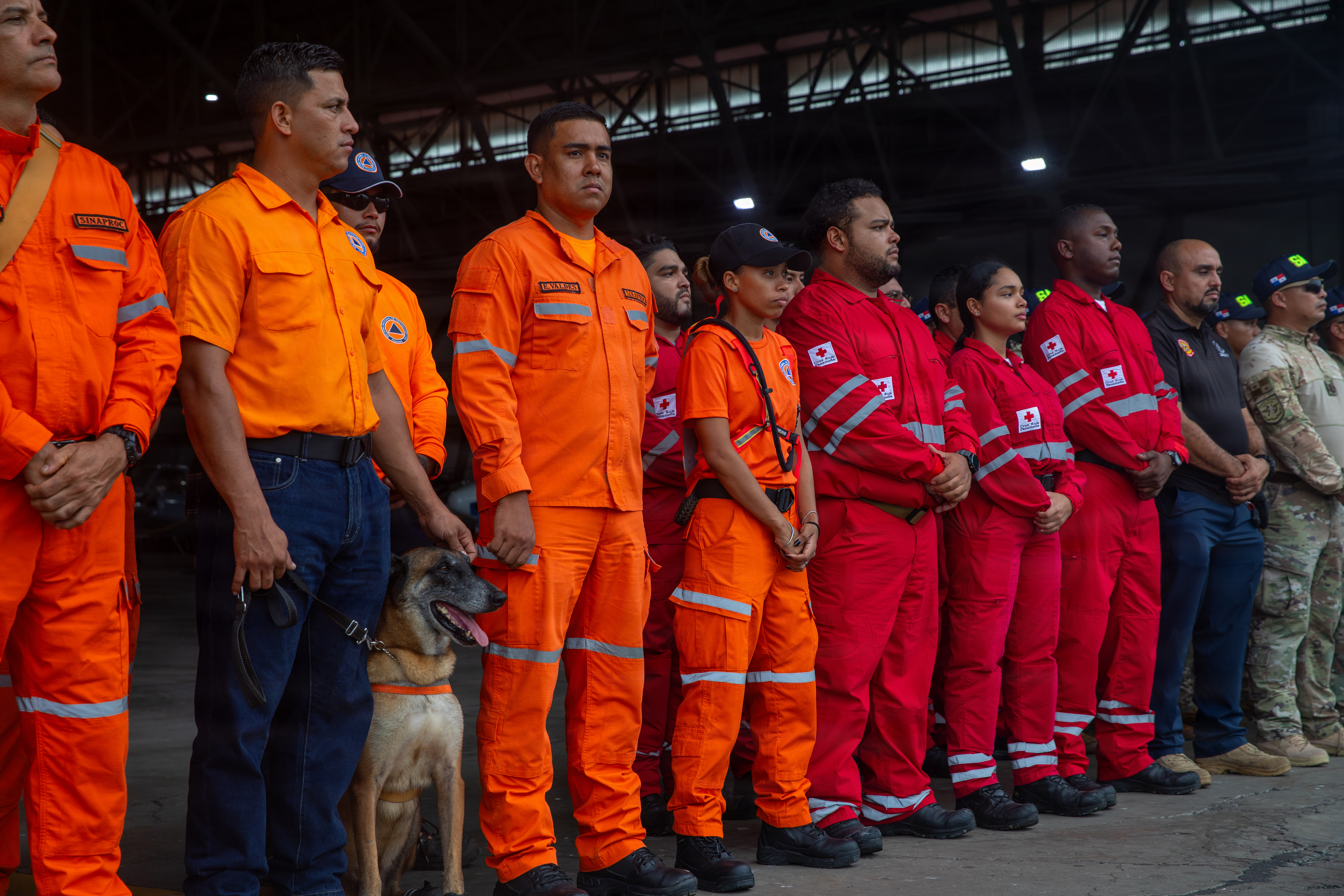
Members of the National Civil Protection System of Panama and the Panamanian Red Cross, preparing to travel to Venezuela.

In Caracas, rescue personnel and volunteers began searching for survivors under the debris of collapsed buildings. Staff at the Hospital de Clínicas in Caracas were requested to "double up on the night shift" to respond to the injured. Acting president Delcy Rodríguez warned that the death count was likely to rise, as operations that focused on searching through rubble and debris had not been completed yet. She specifically mentioned La Guaira, which was described as a "disaster zone", because the number of deaths from that state had not been verified or added to the total. By 1 July, more than 6,400 people were rescued. At the time of the earthquakes, about 30,000 people were in Caraballeda and Catia la Mar; 13,400 of them managed to rescue themselves from the rubble.

Volunteers, many of them residents of La Guaira, began their own rescue efforts to retrieve their neighbours from collapsed apartment buildings. Almost 24 hours after the earthquakes, they dug through the wreckage with their hands as the city faced a shortage of heavy equipment and machinery, with very limited government assistance. Due to this, civilians from cities across the country collaborated and donated food, clothes and resources for the affected, as well as created donation accounts for potential international donors. The high number of injured people began to overwhelm the José María Vargas Hospital, and some casualties had to be treated outdoors. A military supply line was also established outside the city's stadium providing aid. The Venezuelan Armed Forces said field hospitals would be deployed with the capability to support emergency surgeries. Other hospitals across the affected area, such as in Morón, were also overwhelmed by the injured or were short of supplies. A week after the earthquakes, there were 11 international field hospitals established and healthcare personnel from 33 countries, according to Rodríguez.

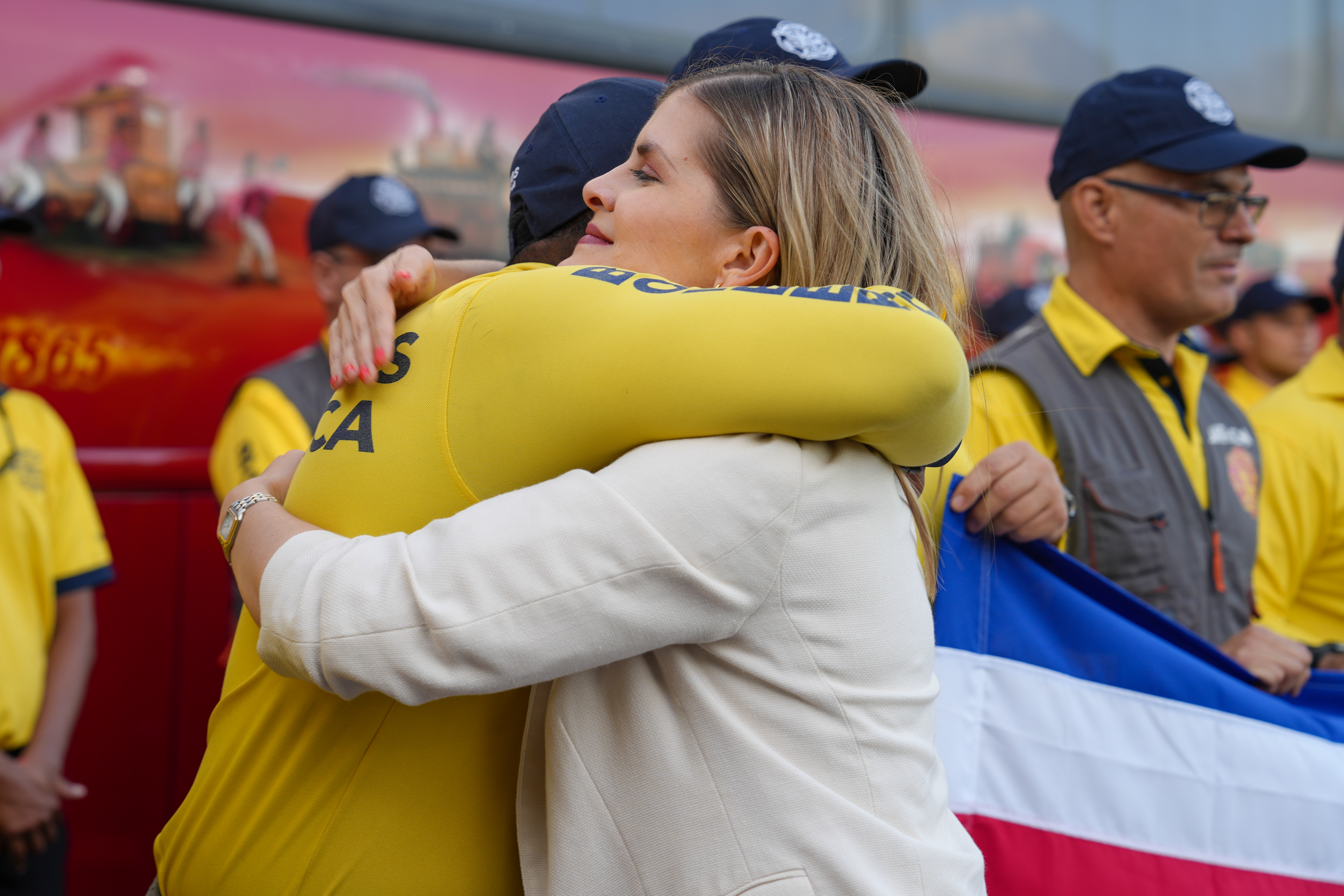
The second contingent of the 48 Costa Rica Urban Search and Rescue (USAR) specialists from the Costa Rica Fire Dept. en route to assist with post earthquake operations in Venezuela.

On 26 June, rescue convoys from Mexico, El Salvador and the Dominican Republic arrived in Venezuela. Firefighters, the military and police civil protection were only present in limited areas one day after the earthquake. Dozens of people from nearby Valencia journeyed through the night, making their way to La Guaira with aid. Residents from Caracas also brought their own supplies to the city along the Caracas–La Guaira highway to aid in the initial rescue efforts. President of the National Assembly Jorge Rodríguez requested that citizens mobilize their supplies through authorities instead of delivering them to La Guaira to prevent road congestions.

On 27 June, Delcy Rodríguez said over 14,000 military personnel and more than 100 pieces of machinery were deployed to La Guaira for peacekeeping efforts. They were joined alongside more than 3,600 rescuers from abroad. However, the search and rescue operations were first carried out by civilians volunteers and relatives of those trapped in the rubble before official and international assistance. The sheer number of non-government response and volunteers arriving from elsewhere worsened the chaos in the state. The government later restricted access to the city on the night of 26 June, only giving access to authorized personnel. Interior Minister Diosdado Cabello defended the restriction to clear roadways for ambulances and for health reasons but did not elaborate on the latter. A volunteer registration center was also established at the Poliedro de Caracas while civilians who want to contribute to the relief were encouraged to do so via aid collection centers. By 4 July, there were nearly 27,000 registrations.

Many Venezuelans, frustrated, claimed the government's response was limited and insufficient; what they saw as the government's attempt to create the impression of an efficient response caused further discontent. At one rubble site, government officials often took selfies before leaving without participating in the recovery effort. Eighty members of a Swiss rescue team said their search dogs found several survivors beneath a rubble site but were unable to rescue them in time. Outrage among civilians were directed at authorities who were managing traffic and making street patrols rather than assisting them in the rescue. In one instance, President Rodríguez disrupted a foreign rescue team from working to thank them.

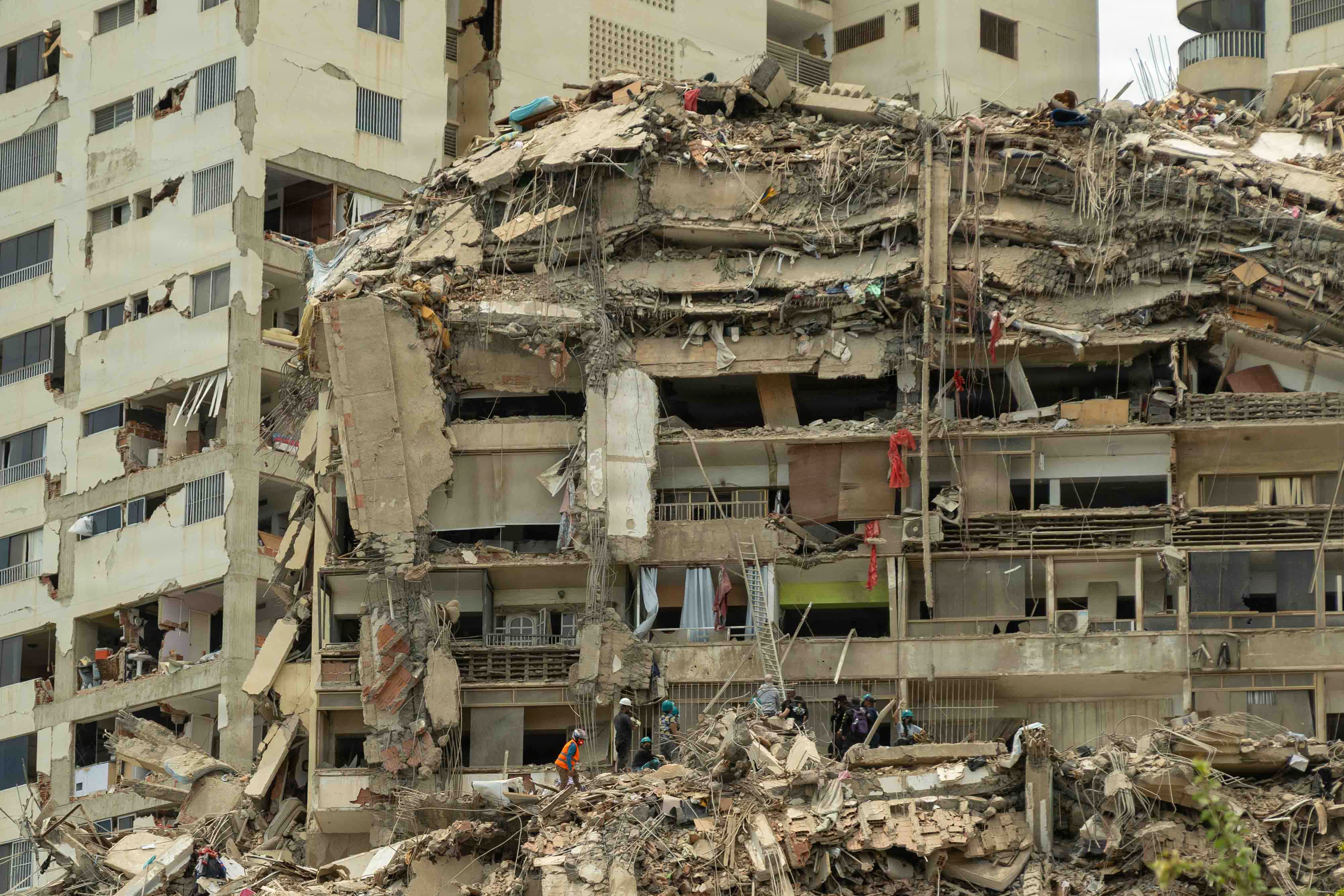
Venezuelan citizens search through the rubble of destroyed buildings in La Guaira

More than 90 hours after the earthquakes, rescue operations were still challenged by insufficient specialized manpower and some equipment breaking down. According to Leonardo Malvasida, a heavy equipment operator, he and 11 others arrived from Lara to assist in rescue efforts but found no equipment prepared. He added that many qualified operators were in La Guaira, but there were no machinery for use. Those that were available were either privately owned and their owners restricted its use, or were inoperable due to lack of fuel or mechanical faults. Machinery began to arrive on 26 and 27 June, but they were insufficient for the scale of destruction. The official response when asked for additional equipment was to wait until current teams have completed their rescue efforts.

Some international rescue teams had ended rescue operations by early July. Teams from Spain and the Netherlands ended their operations as they were unable to find survivors and added that the chance of discovering anyone alive was very slim. Rescuers from Colombia and some United States rescue teams also said they were ending operations for similar reasons. In some areas where signs of life were detected, rescuers spent many hours digging through the rubble only to find no survivors. By the tenth day, most rescue operations had ceased and people began to recover the dead.

Some survivors, including children, spent up to eight days beneath the rubble before they were rescued. One person was Hernán Gil, a guard at the Galerias Playa Grande mall which collapsed, but the concrete booth he was working in shielded him from any injuries. He was rescued after eight days, after rescue workers from seven countries worked for more than three days to free him, as the tunnel rescuers had excavated suffered multiple collapses. He became a symbol of hope for Venezuela. The rescue team was awarded the Hero of Venezuela medal by the Venezuelan government. As of 13 July, more than 2,400 foreign rescuers, 31,800 government personnel, and 30,500 volunteers remained actively deployed. On 23 July, almost a month after the earthquakes, local personnel found two people alive beneath the rubble of a collapsed building.

== Aftermath ==
Buildings in the "Hugo Chávez" housing development affected by the earthquake

Eight hospitals in the greater Caracas area and twelve private health facilities were activated for triage by the health ministry. Many hospitals were strained by the high influx of injured, and were already facing manpower, supply, and equipment shortages before the disaster. The World Health Organization said three hospitals sustained heavy damage and another six were damaged or running at partial capacity following an inspection. Its spokesperson, Christian Lindmeier, said in its early inquiries revealed disorganized delivery services and patient management, increasing surgical queues, and overcrowding. He also added that several midwifery professionals went missing in La Guaira, leading to a "critical gap in obstetric care." Four hospitals in Caracas were found with damage; two were heavily damaged and patients were relocated to other facilities, including a field hospital established by the Indian rescue team.

Injured patients who cannot be treated in La Guaira were transported to Caracas's Pérez Carreño Hospital. Some victims died on the way to the hospital. The hospital's morgue was so overwhelmed with bodies that many were taken to other facilities at Bello Monte and Llanito. The initial influx of patients were those with crush injuries and broken bones. Over the days, the type of injuries physicians increasingly encountered were permanent loss of limbs, kidney failure and crush syndrome. Some also arrived seriously dehydrated and with rhabdomyolysis. At the Ricardo Baquero González Hospital, Caracas, all emergency supplies were depleted within four hours of the earthquakes, so residents began donating their own supplies. At one health facility in La Guaira, patients were treated in its parking lot as there was no more space indoors. Meanwhile, some private health centers in Caracas began providing free treatment. Commercial buildings in La Guaira were transformed into makeshift health centers. A McDonald's in Caraballeda was converted into a field hospital with a triage area, pharmacy, storage unit, and specialized in psychological and veterinary needs, with 30 doctors supporting these care. A bus terminal in Catia La Mar treated about 4,000 patients.

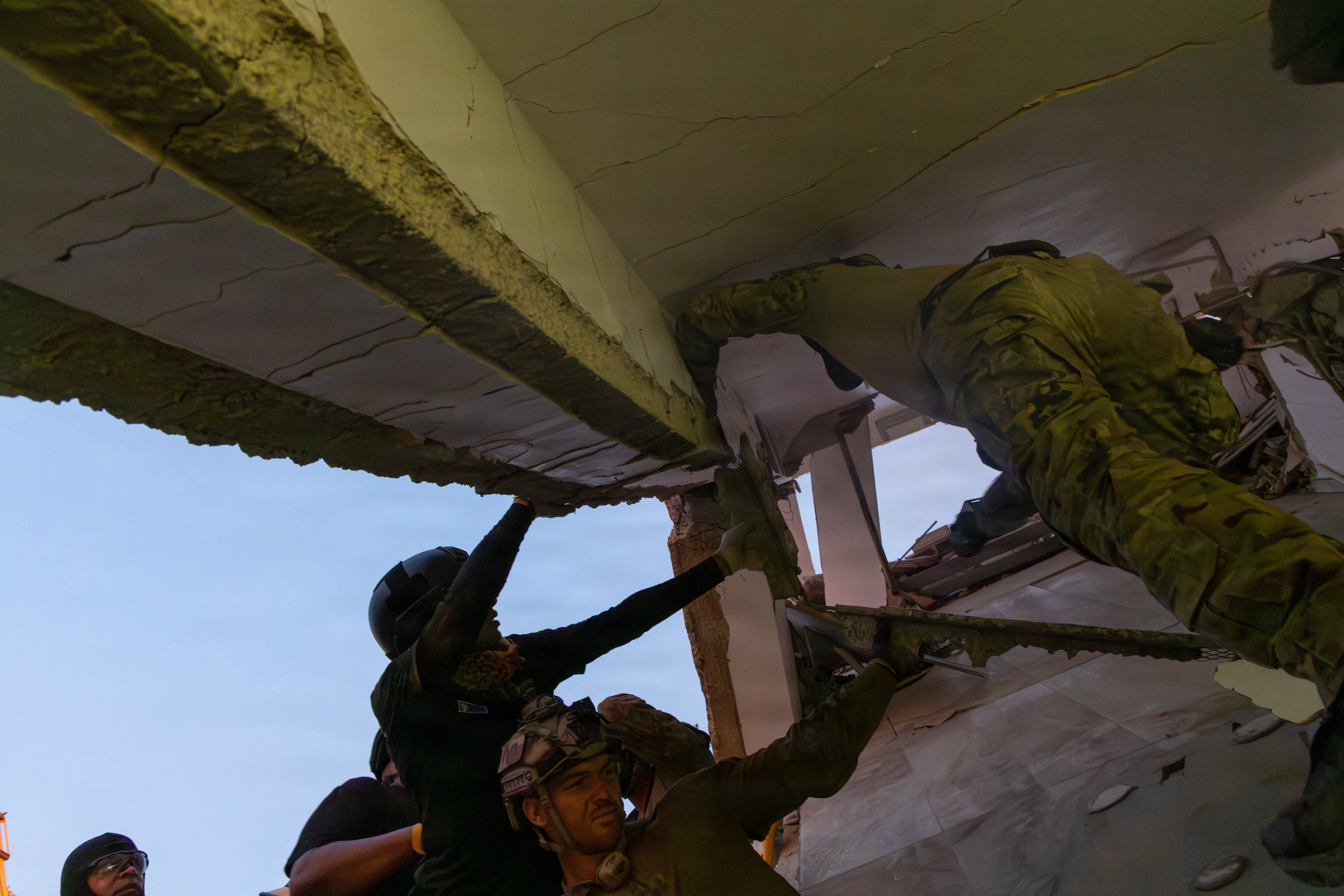
USMC personnel and Venezuelan citizens conduct search and rescue operations at a collapsed building in La Guaira

Aid workers expressed concerns about potential disease outbreaks in the worse-affected areas due to a lack of clean water and poor sanitary conditions, compounded by the existing lack of health specialists. Leading trauma specialist at José Gregorio Hernández Hospital in Caracas, Eugenio Cova, said patients may introduce infections. Veronique Durroux of the United Nations said there could be an outbreak of vector-borne diseases given the hot climate and poor waste control. Doctors were increasingly wary as a rising number of people had to be treated for diarrhoea, dysentery, abdominal pain, nausea and vomiting. Doctors began reporting a rise in skin diseases and diarrhea in Catia La Mar about two weeks after the earthquakes. There was also a surge in requests for medications treating chronic health problems like diabetes and high blood pressure. They linked these occurrences to the poor hygiene conditions and lack of clean water.

Relatives began posting pictures of missing people on social media in the hope that they would be found and later started creating websites independently to report the missing, found and deceased. The Associated Press reported that Venezuelans were sharing details of their missing relatives on digital flyers on platforms such as WhatsApp, Facebook, Instagram and X. However, social media restrictions in the country by the government made the search for missing people challenging. On 26 June, the United Nations appealed to ease those restrictions, and X was subsequently accessible. Three days later, some users later reported that X was inaccessible.

Over 14,600 displaced people across the country were settled into 87 makeshift camps. In La Guaira, there were more than 8,600 people living in 26 shelters. Authorities also created 39 makeshift shelters in Caracas with the capacity for 11,100 people, though only about 5,000 people were living there. Another 1,060 people were distributed across 22 sites in Miranda.

Many displaced residents of La Guaira moved into in schools, sports complexes, stadiums, and other public buildings that became shelters. There, some reported fights and other conflicts among the crowd. In the José María Vargas Sports Complex, more than 1,700 residents brought their tents and mattresses into the game courts. The República de Panamá School also became a shelter for over 350 people, where a single classroom could house three families. Many of these shelter residents spend their day returning to the site of collapsed buildings to search for missing relatives or salvage their belongings. A member of the non-profit, Maniapure Foundation, warned of overcrowding in these facilities, and that aid should be distributed fairly among these shelters. Plan International member Geraldine Gómez said some shelters lack basic hygiene facilities or amenities for women and children.

In Caracas, many displaced people slept on the streets while they await approval from engineers who had to ensure their residential buildings were safe for occupants. Along México Avenue, more than 270 families camped outside the Andrés Bello High School because their apartment was severely damaged. At the Continente residential complex, engineers determined that its basement sustained heavy damage and needed repairs before its occupants could move back inside. Other buildings in La Candelaria Parish were declared unsafe. In La Hoyada, about 160 households sought refuge at Plaza Darío Vivas after their buildings, built under the Great Mission Housing Venezuela scheme, were damaged.

Reports of looting in La Guaira began in the immediate aftermath. One video on social media also showed people ransacking the remains of a collapsed store. Residents said people were looting supermarkets, a pharmacy, other shops, and among the rubble. People were also stealing fuel from cars and impersonating rescue workers to their advantage. Some soldiers and police officers were also caught in the act by residents. Multiple videos and accusations were made online about security forces looting homes. In another video, a police officer was confronted by people for stealing a stash of cash which they managed to remove. Four officers of the Cuerpo de Investigaciones Científicas, Penales y Criminalísticas were arrested and discharged of duties after they were caught stealing, and were expected to be tried, according to its director, Douglas Rico.

== Response ==
Acting president Delcy Rodríguez speaking about the earthquakes along with Jorge Rodríguez and Diosdado Cabello.

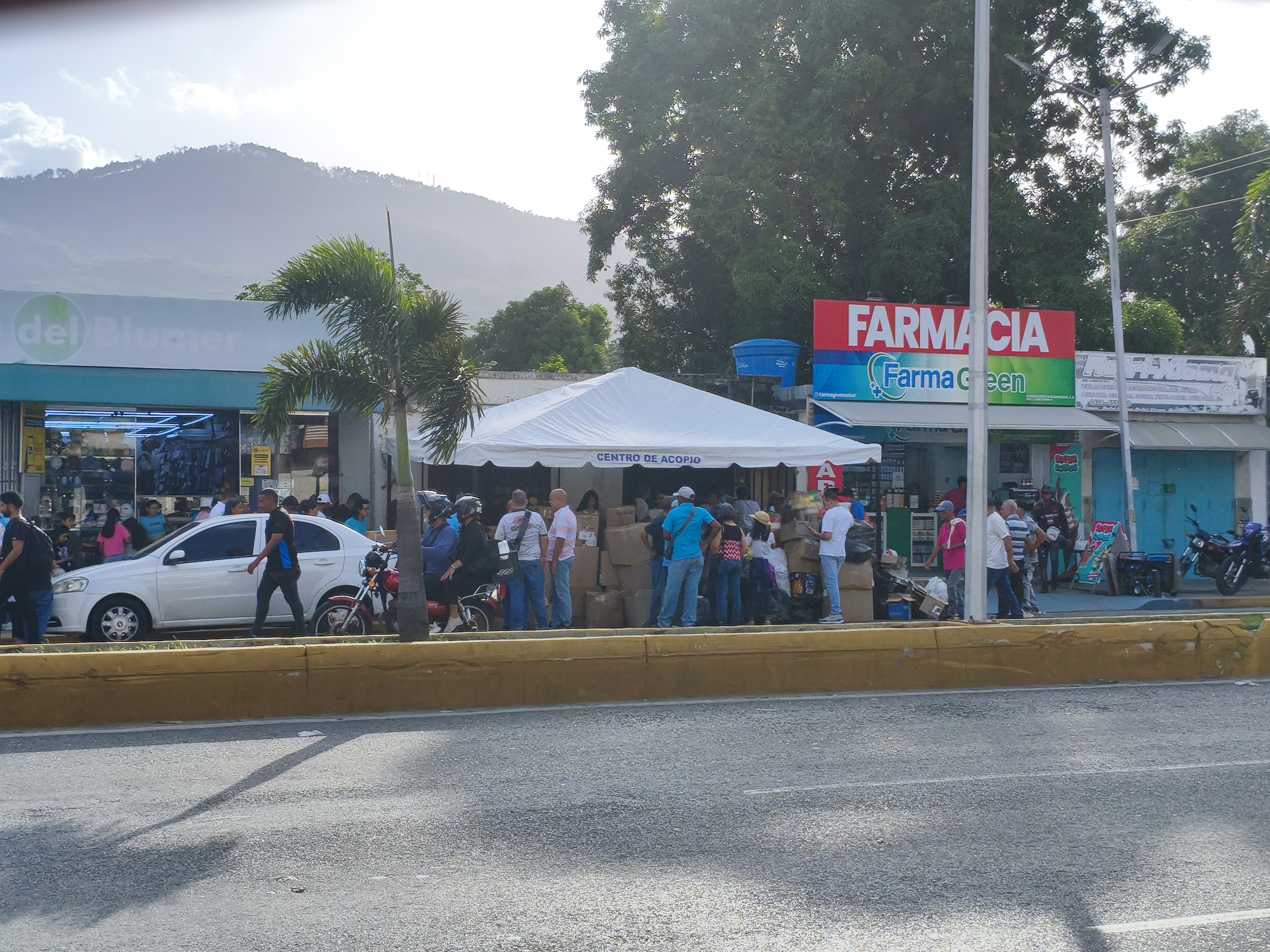
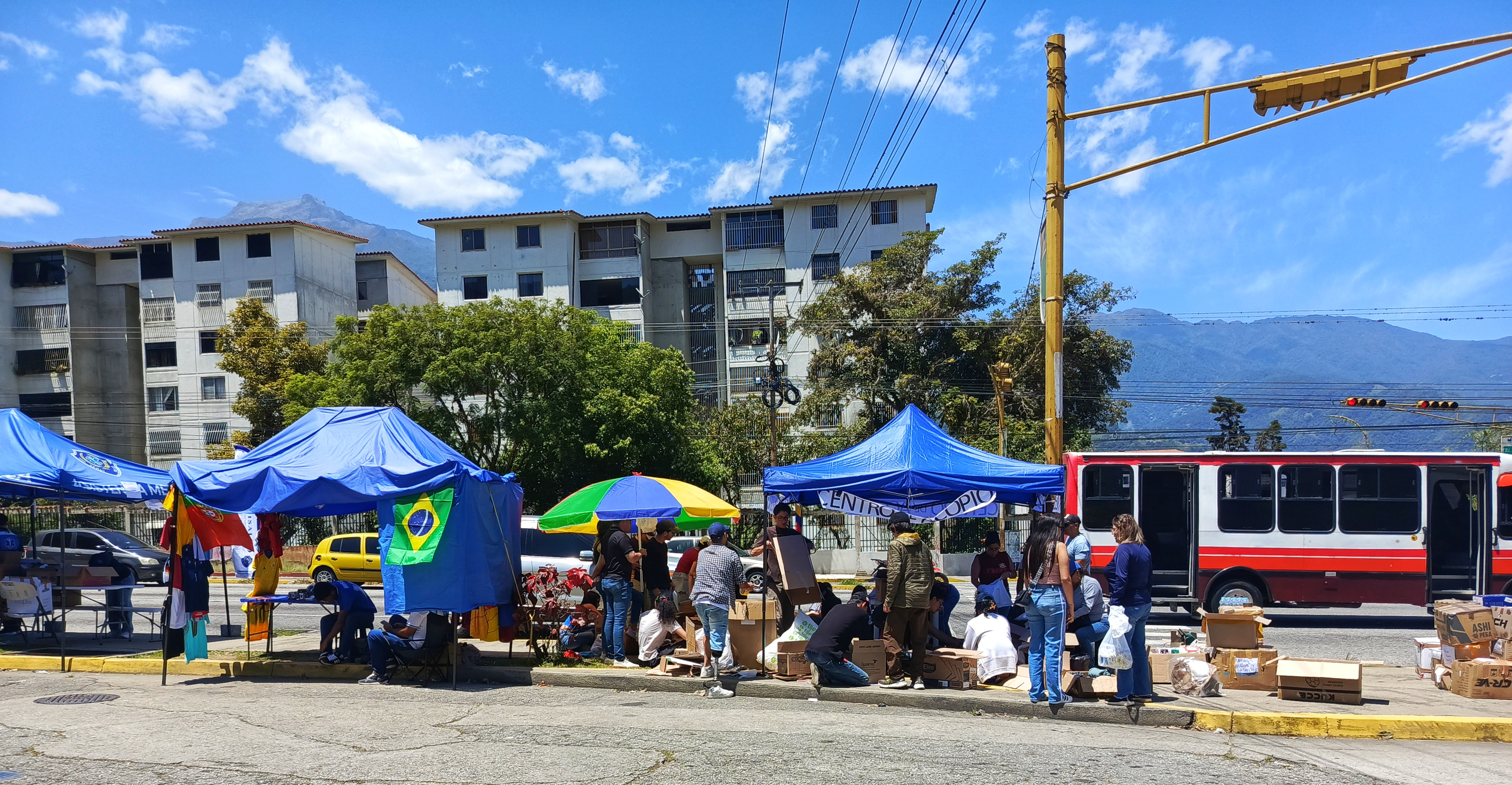
Collection centers in Naguanagua and Mérida.

Immediately after the earthquake, Venezuelan acting president Delcy Rodríguez designated the La Guaira area a disaster zone. A state of emergency was declared in Venezuela by acting president Rodríguez. Interior Minister Diosdado Cabello said that "several" states were impacted. The government ordered the gas supply to be turned off in order to avoid explosions in collapsed buildings in Caracas. Services on the Caracas Metro were suspended and schools were to remain closed for the coming days. Rodríguez also said she would appeal for funds from multilateral organizations to support search and rescue operations. Rodríguez initiated the creation of US$200 million in funds from the International Monetary Fund. The Ministry of Education announced that classes would be canceled for several days and that some school buildings would be used as shelters and donation centers. The Caracas Stock Exchange was closed and was to be re-purposed to help rescue efforts.

On 29 June, Rodríguez announced an inspection committee to evaluate damage incurred to homes and other infrastructure. The committee would comprise public institutions, engineering organizations and universities. These inspections would determine if the building is safe for occupation based on a "traffic light system" of red, yellow and green. A similar system was also announced by mayor Duque of Chacao, Caracas. Rodríguez also announced plans for a rehousing project for those made homeless. The project's chair, Jorge Rodríguez, would work with the Ministry of Habitat and Housing, and local administrations in La Guaira, Aragua, Miranda, Carabobo and Falcón states. Rodríguez said they were in talks with experts and international organizations offering immediate housing, and that assured those affected that they would be housed by the end of the year.

Nationwide, citizens organized themselves in several cities to create collection centers to gather supplies. In Falcón state, more than 20 supply collection centers were established to assist those affected in the Silva municipality, including the headquarters of the National College of Journalists in Paraguaná; the Comprehensive Defense Operational Zone (ZODI) established safe-conduct passes to transport donations. Reports later emerged of officials blocking, preventing, or forbidding aid or the organization of collection centers in the affected areas, by requiring permits from the population and direct collaboration with state authorities. In Altamira, Caracas, police seized the supplies and demanded that they be transported in official state vehicles. In Guanarito, Portuguesa, Civil Protection teams demanded that citizens hand over supplies and said that only they could run a collection center. At Obispos Municipality in Barinas, the national police shut down a collection center. The mayors of Charallave in Miranda and Campo Elías Municipality in Mérida also prohibited collection centers started by civilians with the former saying that donations can only be delivered to the headquarters of the United Socialist Party of Venezuela.

Political opponents of the ruling party criticized these actions, accusing Rodríguez and her administration of politicizing the disaster response. Opposition leaders Heidy Loicett and María Oropeza called these actions "political persecution" and an attempt to control humanitarian aid and improve the government's public image. Former academic at Andrés Bello Catholic University, Benigno Alarcón, said past Venezuelan leaders have attempted to capitalize on disasters including Hugo Chávez. Cynthia Arnson, an international relations analyst at Johns Hopkins University, said these earthquakes could expose the government's inability to provide basic needs and handle the aftermath, which could delay the country's democratic transition. The International Rescue Committee also said the response was not adequate given the scale of destruction. In addition, international journalists reported that the government forces were blocking rescuers in their attempts to aid in the affected areas, including and even impeding international rescue teams from entering the country. In response, Rodríguez said such criticisms were distasteful and were "narratives manufactured in propaganda laboratories.”

The Catholic Church in Venezuela helped organise relief work for the affected families. Asked about damage to Church institutions, the Archbishop of Caracas, Raúl Biord, said that "the needs are immense" but added that "naturally, the main priority now is to rebuild lives". Days later he described the Church's priorities, saying: "As Christians, and as Church, we have been present in the street since Day 1. We have over 35 damaged churches and Church buildings in La Guaira and Caracas, but the Church is more than buildings, and we are present in the streets, visiting the people and taking consolation to hospitals, food to the tents, and celebrating the sacraments in the street, with the people." Caritas centers became hubs for distributing aid. One group of religious sisters who had been visiting the country at the time the earthquake struck elected to stay on, rather than return to Rome, to assist in aid efforts and seminarians from the worst affected dioceses suspended formation so that they could help in rescue work.

== International responses ==
International reactions to the 2026 Venezuela earthquakes
Country; Organization	Reactions; Responses; Actions
Argentina	The Office of the President issued a statement in which President Javier Milei expressed solidarity with the Venezuelan people regardless of differences between their countries' governments. Subsequently, the Argentine government sent a first contingent of 24 rescue brigade members, four rescue dogs, and specialized equipment, followed by a second team with medical personnel and water purification plants. After the deaths of six Argentine citizens were confirmed, it also deployed a humanitarian consular mission.
Aruba	The government expressed its willingness to offer humanitarian aid to Venezuela.
Azerbaijan	The Ministry of Foreign Affairs expressed its condolences for the destruction and deaths caused by the earthquakes.
Barbados	Prime Minister Mia Mottley spoke with Venezuelan acting president Delcy Rodríguez to express her condolences and Barbados' readiness to assist.
Belgium	Belgium offered its expertise and dispatched shelter supplies in Venezuela.
Bolivia	The Bolivian government offered humanitarian aid.
Brazil	President Lula da Silva said he would talk to the Ministry of Foreign Affairs and the Brazilian embassy in Caracas to assess the situation. As of 1 July — Brazil sent a team of 71 firefighters, 4 National Civil Defense technicians, 6 specialists from the National Telecommunications Agency and 6 firefighter dogs, as well as at least 12 tons of search and rescue equipment, 100 water purifiers, 6.5 tons of medical equipment and a Brazilian Navy portable hospital, operated by 93 Marines and medical specialists. The Brazilian Air Force rescued 13 Brazilian nationals which requested support to leave Venezuela following the earthquakes. A team headed by Defence Minister José Múcio also arrived Caracas to discuss further support, such as providing shelter to those affected by the disaster and funding the reconstruction of the affected areas.
Canada	Prime Minister Mark Carney called the earthquakes "catastrophic" and promised Canada will send humanitarian aid. Later, Global Affairs Canada announced CA$5 million dollars in aid.
Chile	The Ministry of Foreign Affairs wrote in a statement that the government "stands ready to provide humanitarian and rescue assistance should it be required." On 25 June, President José Antonio Kast sent a Chilean Air Force plane with 37 team members from the Fire Department's Urban Search and Rescue Group to carry out rescue operations amidst the rubble. The following day, a second plane was sent with 16 rescuers, three tons of humanitarian aid, and two tons of firefighters' equipment.
China	President Xi Jinping said the country was ready to provide "disaster relief and reconstruction". On 6 July, China sent 80 tons of humanitarian aid to Venezuela.
Colombia	The National Unit for Disaster Risk Management deployed more than 60 rescuers, 4 rescue dog teams, and 12 metric tons of equipment.
Costa Rica	Costa Rica responded to the earthquakes by deploying humanitarian and search-and-rescue assistance at the request of the Venezuelan Red Cross through the International Federation of Red Cross and Red Crescent Societies (IFRC). An initial team of 16 Costa Rican Red Cross specialists departed from Juan Santamaría International Airport, including personnel trained in urban search and rescue, collapsed-structure operations, emergency medical care, and logistics. The National Emergency Commission (CNE) subsequently announced a larger deployment of 48 specialized rescuers along with approximately 12 tonnes of rescue equipment and humanitarian supplies, including non-perishable food. The mission was authorized by President Laura Fernández to support ongoing rescue and relief efforts in the affected areas.
Croatia	The government expressed condolences and solidarity with the people of Venezuela and authorized €1 million in urgent humanitarian aid.
Cuba	Foreign Minister Bruno Rodríguez Parrilla expressed condolences and solidarity with Venezuela, adding that "Cuban health workers there are fully mobilized and providing medical services to the affected population."
Czech Republic	A 70-member Heavy Urban Search And Rescue (USAR) Team was deployed to Venezuela on 28 June to join the rescue efforts.
Dominican Republic	President Luis Abinader said the military had readied "specialized search, rescue, and emergency response teams" in support.
Ecuador	President Daniel Noboa said that he had ordered the immediate delivery of humanitarian aid to help respond to the emergency. The foreign ministry said it was deploying 46 urban search-and-rescue personnel, search dogs, and 6 metric tons of equipment.
El Salvador	More than 150 Salvadoran rescue workers and supplies arrived in Venezuela on 26 June as part of President Nayib Bukele's pledge to send 300 rescue workers and paramedics and 50 tons of medical supplies.
European Union	The European Commissioner for Preparedness and Crisis Management, Hadja Lahbib, stressed the European Union is following the situation and that bloc-funded partners are already providing help on the ground.
Finland	Two Finnish NGOs donated €170,000 in aid, consisting of €120,000 from the Finnish Evangelical Lutheran Mission (FELM) and €50,000 from the Finn Church Aid (FCA) to Venezuela.
France	President Emmanuel Macron announced the immediate dispatch of a team of 85 French rescuers specialized in rescue-clearance.
Germany	Defence Minister Boris Pistorius offered six Airbus A400M Atlas transport aircraft available as soon as support is requested. Additionally 48 personnel from the THW (Technisches Hilfswerk) were sent to aid in the rescue and recovery effort. Following the activation of the Union Civil Protection Mechanism (UCPM), the German humanitarian organisation Johanniter-Unfall-Hilfe e.V. deployed an Emergency Medical Team to Venezuela.
Greece	A team of six rescuers with three training dogs and a drone equipped with thermal cameras and sonar are being sent to Venezuela to assist with rescue efforts.
Guyana	President Irfaan Ali expressed his country's readiness to assist Venezuela within its capacities.
Holy See	Pope Leo XIV authorized an initial €100,000 in emergency donations to Venezuela.
Hungary	Hungary sent humanitarian aid to earthquake victims in Venezuela.
India	The Indian Air Force launched 'Operation Amistad', sending two C17s with relief material.
Iran	Foreign Ministry Spokesperson Esmail Baghaei expressed Iran's solidarity with the government and people of Venezuela and announced the country's readiness to provide any assistance needed for relief and rescue operations.
Ireland	The Government of Ireland contributed €1 million for post-earthquake relief in Venezuela.
Israel	The Ministry of Foreign Affairs offered search and rescue assistance. The first rescue delegation arrived in Venezuela on June 26. The assistance is being provided by Israel despite the two nations having no bilateral relations since 2009. At a 3 July press conference — Delcy Rodríguez thanked Israel for the specialized aid it provided, which had been arranged through connections with Venezuelan Jewish community including its Venezuelan Jewish aliyah community in Israel. Israel's ZAKA volunteer organization deployed on June 29. The Israel Defense Force's Home Front Command deployed in July.
Italy	Prime Minister Giorgia Meloni extended solidarity to the Venezuelan authorities and the population, as well as confirming ongoing efforts to promptly activate all channels of humanitarian aid and assistance. Italy deployed three specialized teams totaling 42 firefighters and an additional 36 healthcare workers.
Jamaica	Jamaica sent humanitarian aid to earthquake victims in Venezuela.
Japan	Prime Minister Sanae Takaichi expressed her condolences for the loss of lives and the damage caused by the earthquake. She also stated that Japan is prepared to provide support and relief. Since June 26, a JICA survey team has been assessing 'medical, recovery, and reconstruction needs' in the area. On June 30, upon request of the Venezuelan government, emergency relief goods were provided. On July 1, it was announced that more members of the Japanese Disaster Relief Medical Team would be dispatched to Venezuela in order to provide medical assistance.
Jersey	Jersey Overseas Aid (JOA) pledged £250,000 in emergency humanitarian aid to support relief efforts in Venezuela.
Jordan	Provided a 100-person search-and-rescue operating under the Public Security Directorate — it included 3 doctors from the Jordanian Royal Medical Services.
Lithuania	Lithuania sent rescue and medical teams plus 20 tons of humanitarian aid to Venezuela.
Luxembourg	Luxembourg sent over 2 tons of humanitarian aid to Venezuela.
Malaysia	Prime Minister Anwar Ibrahim extended his condolences to the people of Venezuela.
Malta	Foreign Minister Chris Fearne said Malta is donating €140,000 to support relief efforts through the Red Cross.
Mexico	Provided 250 military rescue personnel, five rescue dogs, four aircraft, a drone, rescue equipment and medical supplies.
Netherlands	Minister of Foreign Trade and Development Cooperation Sjoerd Sjoerdsma confirmed an offer of the Urban Search and Rescue team deployment with rescue workers, dogs, and equipment.
New Zealand	Foreign minister Winston Peters expressed shock and condolences over the earthquake.
Norway	Norway allocated 20 kr million in aid, consisting of 10 kr million via the UN Refugee Agency (UNHCR) and 10 kr million via the International Federation of Red Cross and Red Crescent Societies (IFRC) to support relief efforts in Venezuela.
Pakistan	Prime Minister Shehbaz Sharif said he was "deeply saddened by the devastation and loss of life caused by the earthquakes in Venezuela."
Palestine	President Mahmoud Abbas spoke with Delcy Rodríguez, expressing his condolences and sympathy for the earthquake victims.
Panama	Donation collection points were opened in the country to be delivered to Caracas. On 26 June, President Jose Raul Mulino said a rescue team would arrive in Venezuela.
Peru	The Peruvian government expressed its solidarity with the Venezuelan people.
Philippines	President Bongbong Marcos expressed sympathy for the victims of the earthquakes.
Poland	President Karol Nawrocki expressed his condolences and sympathy for the earthquake victims.
Portugal	Prime Minister Luís Montenegro expressed solidarity and offered to send emergency and humanitarian aid to Venezuela.
Qatar	Delcy Rodríguez said that Qatar had sent rescuers.
Russia	President Vladimir Putin expressed his solidarity and condolences to Delcy Rodríguez. On 3 July, Russia sent humanitarian aid to Venezuela.
Saint Vincent and the Grenadines	The government via the Ministry of Health expressed solidarity with and sent condolences to the Venezuelan government and people. They also stated that foreign minister Fitzgerald Bramble was in communication with the Venezuelan government.
Saudi Arabia	The Ministry of Foreign Affairs expressed sincere condolences for the families of the victims and the government and people of Venezuela.
Serbia	President Aleksandar Vučić expressed solidarity with the Venezuelan people while Minister of Foreign Affairs Marko Đurić stated that the country will offer any assistance needed.
Slovakia	Slovakia sent 15 firefighters, four search-and-rescue dog handlers, two search dogs to Venezuela along with two tonnes of equipment and supplies.
South Korea	The Foreign Ministry expressed condolences and announced that it is reviewing the situation and possible assistance. On 26 June, the government announced that it will provide humanitarian aid worth approximately ₩7.7 billion through international organizations within the region. South Korean internet giant Naver donated $300,000 for post-earthquake recovery efforts in Venezuela. South Korean automotive giant Hyundai donated $1 million (approximately ₩1.5 billion) to support post-earthquake relief and recovery efforts in Venezuela.
Spain	Prime Minister Pedro Sánchez spoke with Delcy Rodríguez to send "the solidarity of Spain with the Venezuelan people" and declared to be ready to help. Spain sent 57 personnel from the Military Emergencies Unit and 40 firefighters from Madrid, along with a field hospital.
Suriname	President Jennifer Simons expressed condolences and solidarity with Venezuela and stated that her country stands ready to assist as much as possible.
Sweden	The government contributed 103.3 kr million for humanitarian aid to earthquake victims in Venezuela.
Switzerland	President Guy Parmelin expressed solidarity and his country's readiness to provide assistance should Venezuela request it. The Federal Council later announced the country is sending a rescue team of 80 rescue workers as well as a several tonnes of rescue equipment. The Swiss Rescue Chain is preparing to deploy to Venezuela to search for and rescue earthquake victims trapped under rubble.
Syria	The Ministry of Emergency and Disaster Management sent a 15-member search-and-rescue team from the Syrian Civil Defence to Venezuela. The operation was carried out with the support of the Qatari International Search and Rescue Group of Lekhwiya.
Thailand	Thailand expressed readiness to send an Urban Search and Rescue team (USAR) to Venezuela
Turkey	The Ministry of Foreign Affairs expressed deep sorrow and solidarity over the loss of life and extensive damage, expressing readiness to provide all necessary assistance. On 2 July — Turkey sent search-and-rescue teams, medical personnel, humanitarian aid, specialized equipment to Venezuela.
Ukraine	President Volodymyr Zelenskyy said that they are ready to provide rescue mission to Venezuela and said that they are ready to send their first responders to help in search and rescue operations.
United Arab Emirates	UAE President Sheikh Mohamed bin Zayed Al Nahyan allocated $10 million in emergency disaster relief. As part of this commitment, the UAE sent 70 tones of humanitarian aid to affected regions, including food packages, medical supplies, and shelter equipment..
United Kingdom	The UK sent a team of 68, along with 6 specialist search dogs, from the UK International Search and Rescue Team (UK-ISAR) to help find people who are buried under rubble. The UK Emergency Medical Team (UK-EMT) were also sent to operate a field hospital.
United Nations	International Organization for Migration Director General Amy Pope called for critically needed, swift international support and announced efforts to assess the needs of the impacted population. The World Food Programme made an appeal for US$50 million to provide sustenance to for three months.
United States	During a press briefing, Secretary of State Marco Rubio confirmed the deployment of the Federal Emergency Management Agency (FEMA) search-and-rescue teams Virginia Task Force One and California Task Force Two to support relief efforts. Undersecretary of State for Foreign Assistance Jeremy Lewin said the department had mobilized a disaster assistance team and task force to coordinate aid in coordination with Venezuela. Deputy Secretary of State Christopher Landau wrote on X that the United States was mobilizing assistance to Venezuela. He added that the United States would be working with Venezuela's interim government to provide search-and-rescue teams, medical care, and humanitarian resources. The State Department said it was preparing US$150 million in aid, consisting of US$50 million from the World Food Programme and International Medical Corps and US$100 million to the United Nations pooled fund. USSOUTHCOM deployed 900 soldiers into Venezuela to assist in the rescue, along with at least 4 MQ-9 Reapers for damage assessment.
Uruguay	President Yamandú Orsi on his tweet, expressed Uruguay's "solidarity with the Venezuelan authorities and people" — adding that it was "closely following the evolution of the situation and reiterate our willingness to collaborate in whatever the Venezuelan government deems necessary." On 4 July, a Uruguayan Air Force aircraft carried an initial shipment of 15 tonnes of medical supplies, sanitary goods, and food, provided jointly by the Uruguayan government and various civil society organizations as part of an organized collection campaign.
Vietnam	Vietnam sent military and police rescue teams as well as search dogs, engineers, medical personnel for search-and-rescue activities in Venezuela. Vietnam also provided US$300,000 for humanitarian aid to earthquake victims in Venezuela.

The Venezuelan diaspora in the United States, Colombia, Spain, and other countries sent supplies to help with relief efforts.

Puerto Rican singer Bad Bunny sent humanitarian aid to Venezuela, which arrived on 3 July 2026. The shipment consisted of approximately 42,000 lb (19,000 kg) of essential supplies. Days earlier, during a tour stop in London on 28 June, he had paused his concert to address Venezuelans directly, expressing solidarity with the country. Interim President Delcy Rodríguez publicly thanked him and other international artists for their contributions during a press conference.

FIFA held a moment of silence for those affected by the earthquakes during all 2026 FIFA World Cup games on 26 and 27 June.

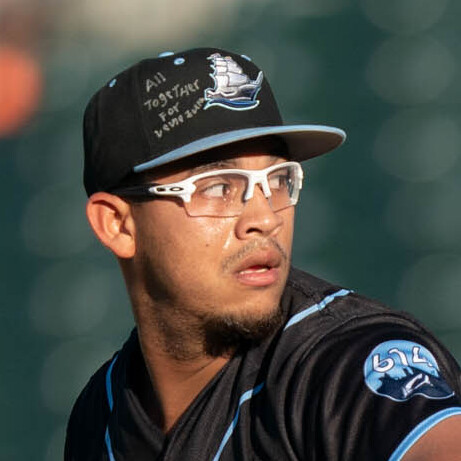
Venezuelan expatriate baseball player Yorman Gómez wearing a hat inscribed with the message "All together for Venezuela" during a game in Nebraska on June 26, 2026

Because of the strong ties with Venezuela, Major League Baseball and its teams provided relief or tributes to those affected.

International Catholic charity Aid to the Church in Need provided an immediate aid package of 100 thousand euros specifically to assist the local Catholic Church in its relief efforts. A high-level ACN delegation then visited the country to assess damages and see how it could contribute to reconstruction of damaged Church buildings.

The U.S.-based nonprofit World Central Kitchen, founded by chef José Andrés, mobilized a relief team within hours of the earthquakes, drawing on partnerships established during previous humanitarian responses in Venezuela. Andrés pledged $1 million to the effort. By early July, the organization was serving thousands of meals daily through local restaurant partners and distribution sites across Miranda, La Guaira, and Carabobo, including a large-capacity field kitchen opened near La Guaira with a target output of 30,000 meals per day.

Israel Rivas, a 24 year old mechanic, from Bolivar State, fluent in English and Japanese, was one of many volunteers who travelled at their own expense to assist in the response. He became a national hero for his selfless efforts.

In Miami, a benefit concert titled "United for Our Own" aimed at helping victims of the Venezuela and 2026 Colombia earthquakes was announced for 16 August at the Kaseya Center, featuring performances by more than 15 artists including Marc Anthony, Ricardo Montaner, Feid, Silvestre Dangond, Piso 21, Jay Wheeler, Elena Rose, Gente de Zona, Mau y Ricky, Olga Tañón, and Lasso.

== See also ==
- Lists of 21st-century earthquakes
- List of earthquakes in 2026
- List of earthquakes in Venezuela
- 1812 Caracas earthquake, another earthquake in the region believed to have had at least two large subevents
- Tsunami, a search and rescue dog that gained attention through his work during the crisis.
- 2026 Colombia earthquake
- 2026 Panama earthquake
- Vargas tragedy
