= Yorgelis =

Yorgelis is a given name. Notable people with the name include:

- Yorgelis Delgado (1982–2026), Venezuelan actress
- Yorgelis Rodríguez (born 1995), Cuban track and field athlete
- Yorgelis Salazar (born 1997), Venezuelan karateka
