= 1967 Caracas earthquake =

6.6 Mw magnitude earthquake in Caracas and La Guaira, Venezuela

- Location within Venezuela
- UTC time: 1967-07-30 00:00:04
- ISC event: 833882
- USGS-ANSS: ComCat
- Local date: 29 July 1967
- Local time: 20:00:04
- Magnitude: 6.6 M_{w}
- Depth: 25.0 km (16 mi)
- Epicenter: 10.56°N 67.33°W
- Fault: San Sebastián Fault
- Type: Strike-slip
- Areas affected: Metropolitan Region of Caracas
- Total damage: $50–140m USD
- Max. intensity: MMI VIII (Severe)
- Casualties: 225–300 dead 1,536 injured

The 1967 Caracas earthquake occurred in Venezuela on 29 July at 8:00 p.m (UTC−04:00), with its epicenter being 20 km (12 mi) from the Venezuelan capital Caracas. It lasted 35 seconds and heavily affected areas such as Altamira, Los Palos Grandes, and Litoral Central, and it was recorded at 6.6 on the moment magnitude scale. In the aftermath of the earthquake, there were several aftershocks of lower intensity. The earthquake left a toll of 1,536 injured, 225–300 dead, and cost US$50–140 million in property damage.

== Tectonic setting ==
Caracas lies close to the transform-type plate boundary between the South American plate and the Caribbean plate. Most of the relative westward motion of the South American plate is taken up by the Boconó–San Sebastián–El Pilar fault system. The San Sebastián Fault runs just offshore except at the Simón Bolívar International Airport where it briefly comes onshore. Three major (M≥7.0) destructive earthquakes are interpreted to have resulted from rupture along this fault system, in 1812, 1900 and 2026.

== Events ==
At 8:05 p.m., Venezuelan time, Caracas was shaken by an earthquake that was recorded at 6.6 on the moment magnitude scale. The staff of the Cagigal Observatory could not precisely determine either the epicenter or the magnitude of the earthquake, because the pendulum seismometer's needle straps broke and the photoelectric cells equipment also had imperfections. After the earthquake, the director of the observatory, ship Captain Ramiro Pérez Luciani, estimated that the epicenter was located on the Humocaro fault, Lara state, about 350 kilometers from Caracas; but the next day, examining the damage reports, he corrected his evaluation, placing it in the Caribbean Sea 70 km from the coast, in front of the Central Coast. The director of the Naval Observatory reported that he would have to resort to foreign specialized institutions in order to determine the data of the earthquake, due to damage to the seismological equipment.

In the Caracas Cathedral, located in the center of the city, a mass was being held when the earthquake occurred, as the stained glass windows of the temple suddenly exploded and the parishioners that were near, quickly escaped to Plaza Bolívar. In a few seconds the hundred year old Pontifical Cross, that crowned the facade, collapsed in free fall until it hit the ground, fragmenting into pieces and leaving a mark of their silhouette on the ground. One of those present would remember the event with the following words: "I saw when the cross came off and was engraved on the floor like a red-hot iron burn; in that precise moment the earthquake ceased," which made many people attribute this to a divine miracle and for several days the silhouette was venerated by the faithful until, on 2 August, the authorities decided to remove the piece of concrete without giving much explanation. Now, after several decades of rumors and speculation around its whereabouts, the same piece is preserved in the Chapel of the Holy Christ of Mercy, located in the Valley sector.

At the Sonomatrix sound studios located in the Antímano sector, sound technician Alejandro López, organist Tulio Enrique León and composer Germán Narvaez, were working on the recording of an instrumental track for a piece recorded by a children's choir a few days before. The three men fled the studio during the seismic movement, however the microphones, consoles and tape recording equipment continued to operate, thus preserving the only recorded sound of the tremor. The FAVEDICA company would much later publish a single disc of this recording with a brief narration explaining what had happened and, included the single aforementioned musical composition alluding to the incident that occurred in the Cathedral of Caracas described above titled: "The Miracle of the Cross", written by Oswaldo Oropeza and performed by Manuelita Sandoval accompanied by the Oropeza Brothers Ensemble.

At the Cadena Venezolana television studios located in the Ruices sector, a program special commemorating the television network's third anniversary was being recorded for rebroadcast the following day. As Venezuelan folk singer Purita Reina accompanied by the musical ensemble of Mario Suárez and the television station's ballet began to perform, the background scenery on the set began to lurch in a vertical motion. As the lighting technician raised the alarm, the musical artists continued to perform until they realized that an earthquake was happening and fled the studio in a panic. According to press reports at the time, a studio camera recorded images showing the camera topple to the floor then continued to film as the studio floor began to undulate in a wave pattern until the camera stopped functioning. At the same time in an adjacent studio, approximately 600 spectators had gathered to watch a catch wrestling program that was about to be broadcast live. The studio's occupants were able to evacuate without injuries and the building did not suffer any structural damage.

The violent expansion covered the Northern Caracas outer seismic zone for a duration of about 55 seconds, which extends for more than 20 kilometers between the towns of Arrecifes and Naiguatá. These zones off the Central Coast, together with those of Altamira and Palos Grandes in Caracas, were the ones that had the most damage.

In Caraballeda, in the current Vargas state, five of the eleven floors of the "Charaima Mansion" were destroyed; a few months after they attempted to demolish the building with explosives and, where their goal was not achieved, a demolition ball had to be employed. Also, the Macuto Sheraton Hotel had heavy damage to their structures.

== Damage ==
Damage was extensive in the Altamira and Los Palos Grandes sections of Caracas where four major apartment buildings, 10 to 12 stories high, collapsed. Many additional structures were severely damaged and several had to be razed and reconstructed.

Huge sections of walls fell from buildings, flattening cars below and leaving large portions of structures exposed. Rescue workers used cranes and bulldozers to search through the rubble for survivors or victims of the earthquake. A week after the shock, in Caraballeda, rescue operations continued for persons believed trapped beneath the floors of Mansion Charaima, an apartment building across the street from the Macuto Sheraton (which was also damaged). Maracay, about 50 miles west of Caracas, reported five deaths and 100 injuries. Several additional towns reported structural damage.

== See also ==
- 1641 Caracas earthquake
- 1812 Caracas earthquake
- List of earthquakes in 1967
- List of earthquakes in Venezuela
