= Isabel Jara =

Spanish–Venezuelan civil servant (1957–2026)

Delegate of the Government of the Canary Islands in Venezuela
- In office August 2023 – 24 June 2026

Personal details
- Born: Isabel Jara Noda; 1 May 1957 La Guaira, Venezuela
- Died: 24 June 2026 (aged 69) La Guaira, Venezuela
- Party: Canarian Coalition

Isabel Jara Noda (1 May 1957 – 24 June 2026), also known as Chabela Jara or simply Chabela, was a Spanish and Venezuelan civil servant and institutional representative. From August 2023 until her death, she served as the delegate of the Government of the Canary Islands in Venezuela. She was head of the Canarian Government Office in the country.

Jara was president of the Council of Spanish Residents (CRE) of the Venezuelan consular district, an organization she first chaired in 2021. She was re-elected in 2026.

Jara died in June 2026 as a result of the double earthquake that devastated Venezuela, when the building where she resided in La Guaira collapsed.

== Early life and education ==
Isabel Jara Noda was born in La Guaira on 1 May 1957, into a family of Canarian origin. She was the daughter of emigrants from the island of La Gomera; according to immigration documents, her father was among the 171 people who participated in the clandestine voyage to Venezuela aboard the sailboat Telémaco. Holding dual Spanish and Venezuelan nationality, she completed her secondary education in New York City and returned to Venezuela in 1986.

In 1989, Jara earned a university-level technical degree in Fiscal Sciences from the School of Public Finance in Caracas, under the then Ministry of Finance, specializing in Municipal Tax Management. In 1996 she also graduated as a professional fashion designer from the Brivil Institute in Caracas, where she received the "Golden Thimble" honorable mention. She was a widow and had four children and nine grandchildren.

== Career ==
Jara served as a revenue officer in the Vargas Municipality of La Guaira between 1988 and 2000. Following the Vargas tragedy of 1999, which marked her social vocation, she was coordinator of the Canary Islands Government's socio-labor agency created to assist the victims between 2000 and 2005. From that year onwards, she worked as an administrator for the Canary Islands Foundation for Foreign Action (Fucaex) in Venezuela, with the function of coordinating social aid programs.

=== Council of Spanish Residents ===
Linked to the Canarian Coalition Venezuela list since 2010, Jara served as a councilor for the Council of Spanish Residents (CRE) in the Venezuelan consular district, where she was a member of the Social Affairs Committee and the Standing Committee, and served as the general councilor for Spanish Citizenship Abroad in Venezuela.

In 2021, Jara was elected president of the CRE in Venezuela, becoming the first woman to lead this consular advisory body in the country. As president of the CRE, she advocated for support for the Spanish and Canarian communities—including food and medicine vouchers, non-contributory pensions, and aid to care facilities—and praised the situation of Canarians as one of the communities "best served" by Spanish institutions.

In the CRE elections of 3 May 2026, the Canarian Coalition Venezuela list, headed by Jara, obtained an absolute majority with 4,741 votes (54.70%) and eight of the fifteen councilors. On 15 May 2026, the XI Mandate of the CRE of Venezuela (2026–2030) was constituted with Jara as president and Ana María Navarro Rodríguez as secretary; it was the first time in the history of the Venezuelan CRE that its presidency was revalidated for a new term.

=== Delegate of the Government of the Canary Islands ===
On 24 July 2023, the Canary Islands Government Council appointed Jara head of the Canary Islands Government Office in Venezuela, a position she assumed in August of that year, replacing José William Montesdeoca Rodríguez, who had held it since 2019. As delegate of the Canary Islands Government, Jara coordinated the regional government's foreign action towards the island community in the country—estimated at 70,000 Canary Islanders and their descendants—and the management of social assistance programs. She maintained a close relationship with the leader of the Canarian Coalition, Ana Oramas, with whom she traveled throughout Venezuela for more than 27 years.

== Death ==
On 24 June 2026, a double earthquake of magnitudes 7.5 and 7.2 struck Venezuela, leaving the state of La Guaira declared a disaster zone. Jara lived in a penthouse apartment in the Macuto neighborhood of La Guaira, one of the most devastated areas; the building collapsed after the earthquakes, and her whereabouts became unknown, with her family, colleagues, and the Canarian regional government unable to contact her.

On 26 June 2026, the spokesperson for the Canarian government, Alfonso Cabello, confirmed that her body had been located and conveyed the Executive's condolences to her family, friends, and colleagues. The Government of the Canary Islands declared three days of official mourning and held an extraordinary Cabinet meeting to coordinate aid to Venezuela. Canary Islands president Fernando Clavijo and deputy president Ana Oramas dedicated farewell messages to her.
