= Milagros Eulate =

Venezuelan politician (1962/1963–2026)

Member of the National Assembly of Venezuela
- In office 5 January 2016 – 24 June 2026

Personal details
- Born: 1962 or 1963 La Guaira, Venezuela
- Died: 24 June 2026 (aged 63) La Guaira, Venezuela
- Party: AD

Milagros Susana Sánchez Eulate (1962 or 1963 – 24 June 2026) was a Venezuelan politician. A member of Democratic Action, she served in the National Assembly of Venezuela from 2016 to 2026.

Eulate died in La Guaira following the 2026 Venezuela earthquakes on 24 June 2026. She was 63.
