= Tsunami (dog) =

Venezuelan search and rescue dog

- Tsunami Sculpture in Valencia by Josué Benjamín
- Species: Canis familiaris
- Breed: Border Collie
- Sex: Male
- Born: 2017; Venezuela
- Occupation: Search and rescue dog
- Known for: Rescue dog that helped during the Venezuela earthquakes in 2026
- Owner: Jorge Beens

Tsunami (born 2017) is a Border Collie search and rescue dog in Venezuela who received national and international attention during the 2026 Venezuela earthquakes.

== Career ==
Tsunami was rescued from abuse and abandonment in Caracas by the Asociación Pro Defensa de los Animales (APROA), a civil organisation which protects the rights and wellbeing of animals. Tsunami went on to be adopted by Jorge Beens, the director and founder of the Centro de Formación de Equipos Caninos de Intervención de Desastres (the Canine Disaster Intervention Team Training Centre). In 2022, Beens said that Tsunami is one of only a few dogs in Venezuela certified as a search and rescue dog for landslides. In 2023, Tsunami was involved with the Simón Bolívar Humanitarian Task Force (la Fuerza de Tarea Humanitaria Simón Bolívar) which worked to rescue people in Turkey and Syria following earthquakes that impacted both countries.

In 2026, Tsunami worked to rescue dozens of people in La Guaira, the capital of the Venezuelan state of La Guaira in the aftermath of the 2026 Venezuela earthquakes. Videos circulated of Tsunami searching through rubble. This six day rescue mission was Tsunami's last job before his retirement in 2026 at the age of nine. The work from these six days had left Tsunami exhausted, requiring an IV drip and being placed on medical observation. In the course of his career, Tsunami had facilitated the rescue of several hundred people.

Tsunami received national and international attention as a result of his role in the search and rescue efforts following the 2026 earthquakes. During the crisis, footage circulated online of Tsunami searching through rubble and debris which was met with admiration and support for the dog. Writing in Forbes, Luis E Romero said that Tsunami had become a symbol of "the selflessness of a people who showed up for each other after one of the worst natural disasters to ever hit their country".

In September 2026, a large bronze statue of Tsunami was erected in his honour in Verda del Lago Park, Maracaibo. Giancarlo Di Martino, Mayor of Maracaibo, awarded Tsunami the Honor Button of Merit, the Medal of Valor, and the fire department's insignia. A plaque on the statue names Tsunami as the "guardian of hope" ("Guardián de la esperanza"). K-SAR ECID said that "he retires at the top of his game, proving his courage and giving everything in the field".

== About ==
Born in 2017, Tsunami is a Border Collie, a British working breed of medium size herding dog. Tsunami has heterochromia, having one blue eye and one brown. Coverage of Tsunami's work commented on how a rescued dog had gone on to rescue people, using his case to promote adoption.

== See also ==
- List of individual dogs
