= María Clemencia López =

Venezuelan diplomat (1940–2026)

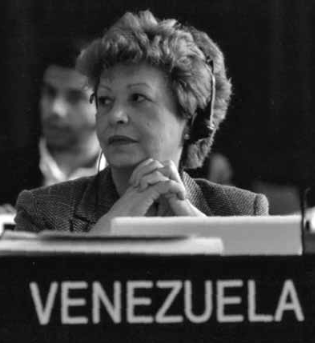
- López Ramírez as the Venezuelan chargé d'affaires at the United Nations

Ambassador of Venezuela to Cuba
- In office 1989–1992
- President: Carlos Andrés Pérez

Ambassador of Venezuela to Trinidad and Tobago
- In office 1984–1989
- President: Jaime Lusinchi

Personal details
- Born: María Clemencia López Ramírez; 1940 Venezuela
- Died: c. 24 June 2026 (aged 85–86) La Guaira, Venezuela
- Occupation: Diplomat

María Clemencia López Ramírez (Note: In this Hispanic American name, the first or paternal surname is López and the second or maternal family name is Ramírez.) (1940 – c. 24 June 2026) was a Venezuelan diplomat. She served as chargé d'affaires at the Venezuelan mission to the United Nations from 1977 to 1978, ambassador to Trinidad and Tobago from 1984 to 1989, and ambassador to Cuba from 1989 to 1992.

== Personal life ==
López was born in 1940. She was a graduate of the School of International Affairs at the Central University of Venezuela, the National Defense Institute of Venezuela and New York University for Latin American Studies. She had extensive experience in the field of international relations through her work for the United Nations.

López was married to Puerto Rican national José Ignacio Jiménez. She and her husband were reported missing in La Guaira on 26 June 2026 after two M_{w} 7.2 and M_{w} 7.5 earthquakes struck Yaracuy on 24 June. On 28 June, Venezuelan authorities confirmed both López and her husband were found dead inside their destroyed home.

== Career ==
From 1965 to 1980, López served on the Committee on Decolonization, the Committee on Social Development, and the Committee of the Office of the United Nations High Commissioner for Refugees. She also worked within the Non-Aligned Movement during the independence movements of emerging countries in the Caribbean and Africa, as well as on other international events related to decolonization. She began her career at the United Nations in 1965 at the United Nations Office at Geneva. She was the chargé d'affaires for the Venezuelan mission to the United Nations from 1977 to 1978. She also became Venezuela's ambassador to Trinidad and Tobago, Cuba, and the Dominican Republic. In 2003, López was appointed secretary general of the Venezuelan National Commission for UNESCO in Caracas, and deputy representative of Venezuela to the UNESCO Executive Board in Paris, after having held various positions related to OPEC and the 500th anniversary of the discovery of the New World. In May 2026, she became a supporter of the Adebo association, a Spanish donkey sanctuary.
