= Yorgelis Delgado =

Venezuelan actress (1982–2026)

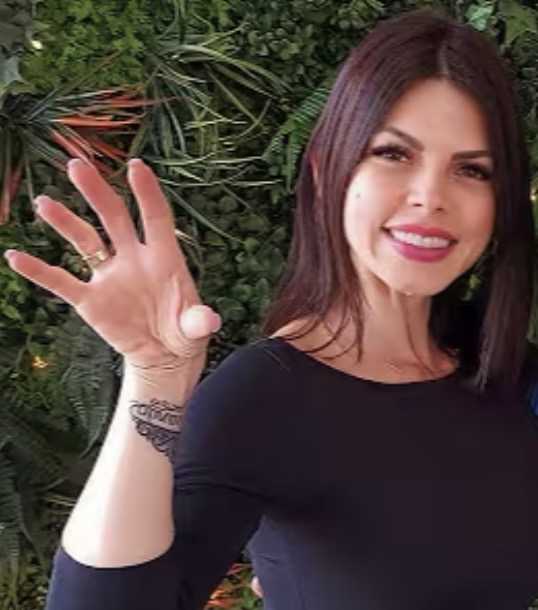
- Delgado in 2023
- Born: Yorgelis del Carmen Delgado Escalona; 1982 or 1983
- Died: c. 24 June 2026 (aged 43); La Guaira, Venezuela
- Years active: 1996–2009

Yorgelis del Carmen Delgado Escalona (1982 or 1983 – c. 24 June 2026), better known as Yorgelis, was a Venezuelan actress. She was featured in a number of television shows and telenovelas.

== Life and career ==
Throughout her career, Delgado was in a number of television shows and telenovelas. In March 2017, she was involved in a viral scandal, when several videos of her with the former member of the group Calle Ciega, Kent Barry James and actress Erika Schwarzgruber, having sex were leaked.

On 24 June 2026, Delgado and her daughter were reported missing in La Guaira following the 2026 Venezuela earthquakes. Her daughter was found alive. Delgado and her mother, Gladys Escalona de Delgado, were confirmed dead on 3 July. Delgado was 43.
