= 1641 Caracas earthquake =

Earthquake in Venezuela

- Location within Venezuela
- Local date: 11 June 1641
- Magnitude: 6.5 M_{s}
- Epicenter: 11.0°N 67.0°W
- Areas affected: Venezuela, Caracas
- Casualties: 200

The 1641 Caracas earthquake took place in Venezuela on 11 June 1641. It is often known as the San Bernabé earthquake because 11 June is the feast day of Barnabas in the Catholic calendar. The earthquake caused extensive damage in Caracas and the destruction of La Guaira; the event led the Caracas City Council to propose rebuilding its city in what was then the savannah of Chacao, a move that was opposed by the Governor, Ruy Fernández de Fuenmayor.

== See also ==
- 1812 Caracas earthquake
- 1967 Caracas earthquake
- List of earthquakes in Venezuela
- List of historical earthquakes
