= San Sebastián Fault =

Geological faults in Venezuela

- Falla San Sebastián
- Location of the fault in Venezuela
- Etymology: San Sebastián de Maiquetía
- Coordinates: 10.65°N 67.5°W
- Country: Venezuela
- State: Vargas, Miranda, Aragua, Carabobo
- Cities: Caracas, La Guaira, Puerto Cabello, Higuerote

Characteristics
- Range: Cordillera de la Costa
- Part of: Boconó-San Sebastián-El Pilar Fault System
- Segments: Bruscas Fault
- Length: 500 km (310 mi)
- Strike: ENE-WSW
- Dip: Near-vertical
- Dip angle: 80-90°

Tectonics
- Plate: Caribbean-South American
- Status: Active
- Earthquakes: 1610, 1900, 2026
- Type: Strike-slip fault
- Movement: Dextral
- Age: Holocene
- Orogeny: Andean

The San Sebastián Fault (Spanish: Falla de San Sebastián) or Morón Fault Zone is a west–east trending geological fault located mostly just offshore northern Venezuela in the adjacent Caribbean Sea. The fault's sense of displacement is right-lateral strike-slip. The fault forms part of the diffuse boundary between the Caribbean and South American tectonic plates, linking the Boconó Fault to the west and the El Pilar Fault System to the east. The existence of this fault was hypothesized as early as 1888.

== Geometry ==
The western end of the San Sebastián Fault is interpreted to be onshore, a few tens of kilometres east of San Felipe in Yaracuy. It continues eastward, crossing the shoreline near Morón, into the Caribbean Sea. Its offshore location is based on the interpretation of a series of south–north trending seismic reflection profiles. In this western section, the fault bounds a major sedimentary basin, the Bonaire Basin, with a thick Paleogene to recent fill. It remains close to the coast as far as Caracas, near where it comes onshore briefly at the Simón Bolívar International Airport, where it is also known as the Bruscas Fault. Further east it goes offshore again, becoming a simpler mostly single strand structure, compared to the multi-strand fault zone to the west. As the coast turns to the southeast, the fault takes on a more east-southeast trend and overlaps with the westernmost segment of the El Pilar Fault, forming the Cariaco pull-apart basin.

== Notable earthquakes ==
The 1812 Caracas earthquake is thought to have involved two sub-events, the first on the Boconó Fault and the second on the western part of the San Sebastián Fault. The damaging 1900 San Narciso earthquake is thought to have been caused by rupture along the San Sebastián Fault to the east of Caracas. On 24 June 2026, a doublet earthquake consisting of a magnitude 7.2 foreshock and 7.5 mainshock struck approximately 20 km west of Catia La Mar, La Guaira, causing widespread damage across northern Venezuela. The USGS identified the mainshock rupture as consistent with right-lateral strike-slip faulting along the San Sebastián fault system. Strong ground motion data, back projection analysis and a lack of aftershocks are consistent with supershear rupture speeds along the westernmost segment of the San Sebastián Fault.

== See also ==
- Vargas tragedy
- 2026 Venezuela earthquakes
