= GEOSCOPE Observatory =

Global seismometry network

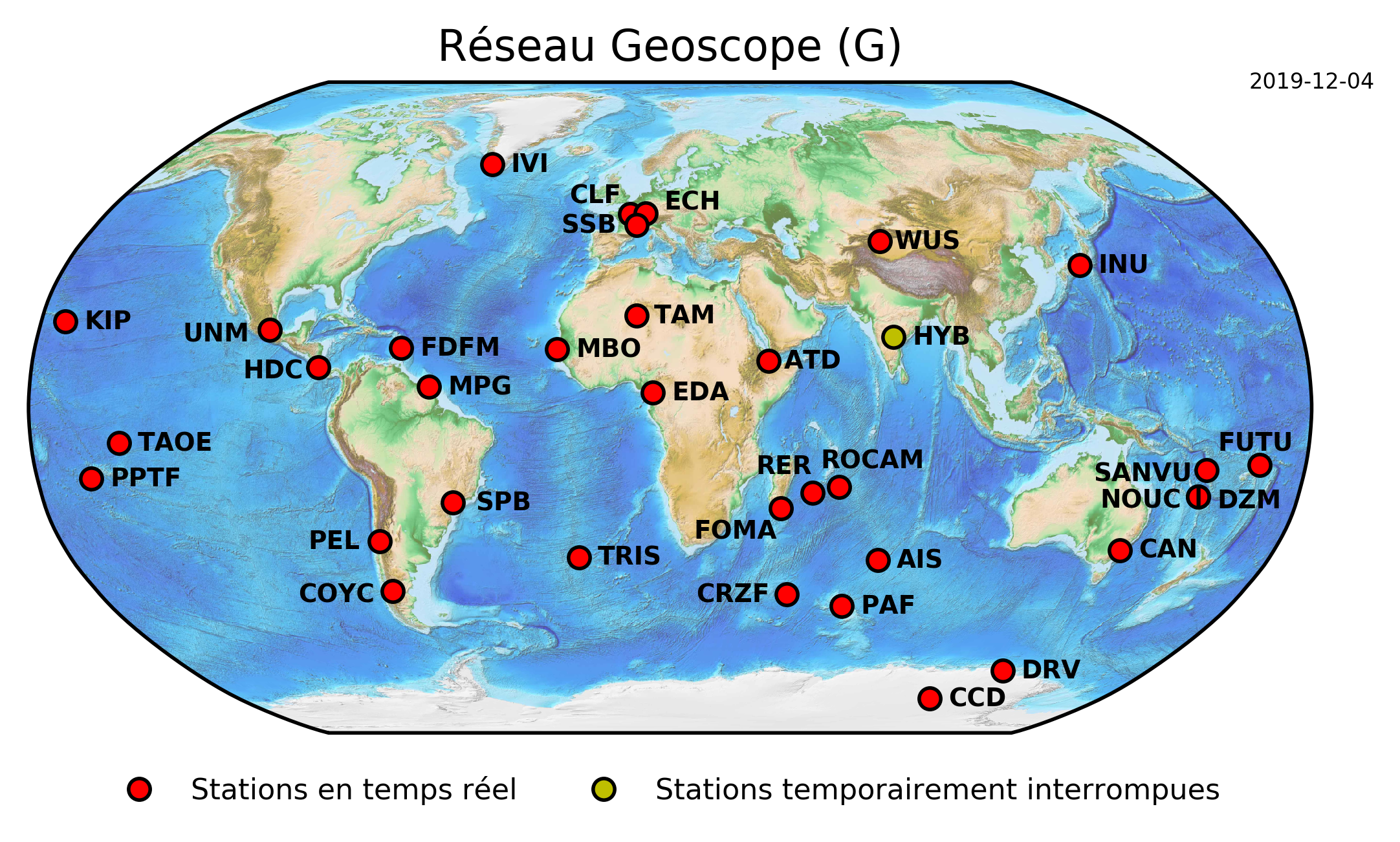
Map of the Geoscope network's seismological stations, Dec 2019

The GEOSCOPE Observatory is a global network of 35 broadband seismic stations across 18 countries that share their data with the French and international scientific community. The observatory was established in 1982, and the acquired data is managed by and is available at the French Institut de Physique du Globe de Paris (IPGP).

All GEOSCOPE stations transmit data in real time to the data center, and the data is also automatically transmitted to tsunami warning centers. The incoming data from the stations are technically validated by IPGP or Ecole et Observatoire des Sciences de la Terre (EOST).
