= Yorman Gómez =

American baseball player (born 2002)

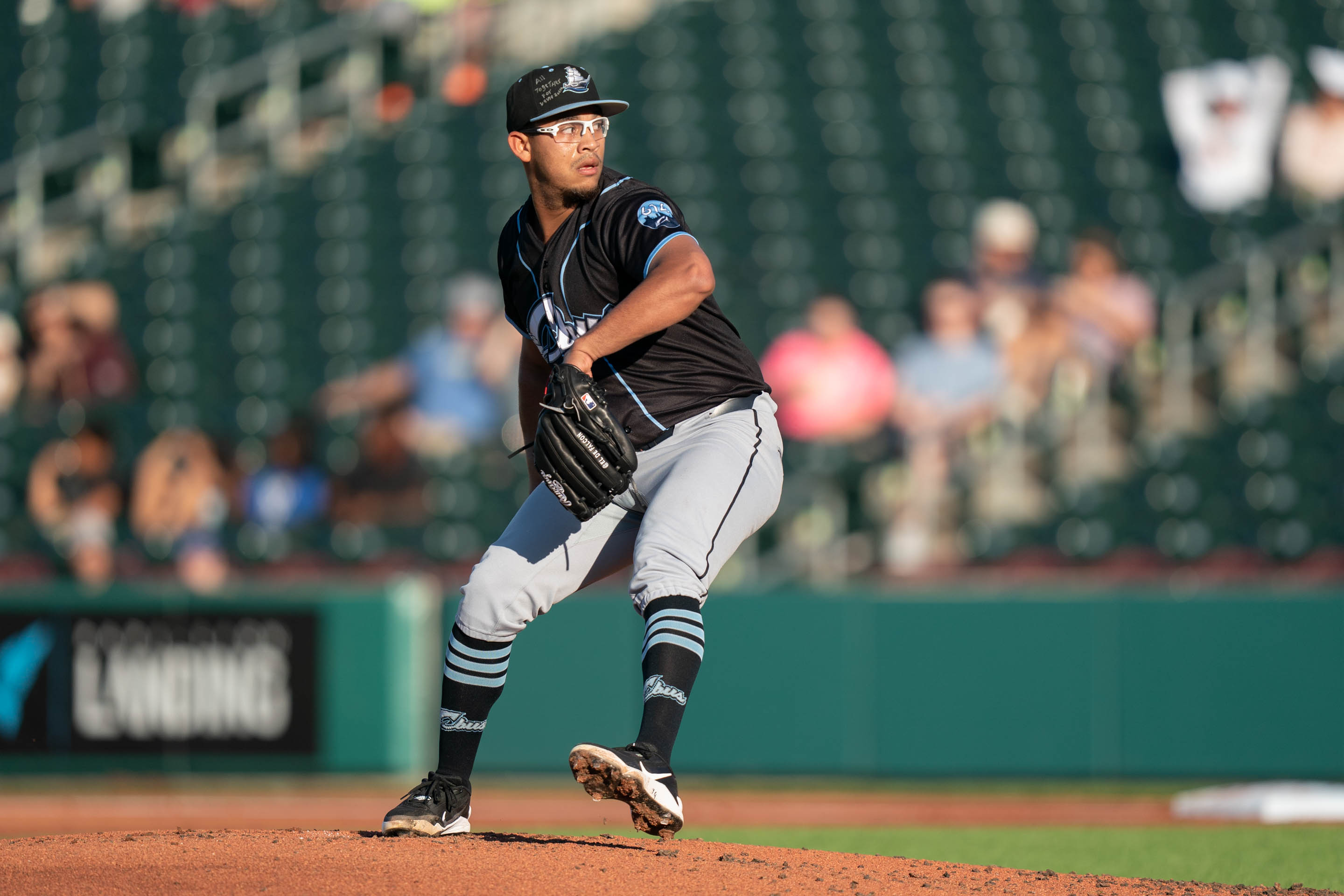
- Gomez with the Clippers in 2026

Cleveland Guardians – No. 95
- Pitcher
- Born: November 10, 2002 (age 23); Coro, Venezuela
- Bats: Right Throws: Right

Yorman Jesus Gómez (born November 10, 2002) is a Venezuelan professional baseball pitcher for the Cleveland Guardians of Major League Baseball (MLB).

== Professional career ==
Gómez signed with the Cleveland Indians as an international free agent in July 2019. He did not play in a game in 2020 due to the cancellation of the minor league season because of the COVID-19 pandemic.

In 2025, Gómez made 27 appearances (15 starts) for the High-A Lake County Captains and Double-A Akron RubberDucks, for whom he accumulated a 12-2 record and 2.96 ERA with 139 strikeouts and three saves across 121 2/3 innings pitched. On November 18, 2025, the Guardians added Gómez to their 40-man roster to protect him from the Rule 5 draft.

Gómez was optioned to the Triple-A Columbus Clippers to begin the 2026 season.
