= 2025 in Venezuela =

- Centuries: 19th; 20th; 21st
- Decades: 2000s; 2010s; 2020s
- See also: Other events of 2025; Years in Venezuela; Timeline of Venezuelan history

Events in the year 2025 in Venezuela.

== Government ==
- President – Nicolás Maduro
- Vice President – Delcy Rodríguez
- President of the National Assembly – Jorge Rodríguez Gomez
- President of the IV National Assembly of Venezuela – Dinorah Figuera

== Events ==
=== January ===
- 6 January – Venezuela breaks off diplomatic relations with Paraguay after the latter's president Santiago Peña recognizes Edmundo González Urrutia as president-elect of Venezuela.
- 9 January – Opposition leader María Corina Machado is arrested by government security forces after leaving a rally in Caracas.
- 10 January – Nicolas Maduro is inaugurated as President of Venezuela for a third term until 2031.
- 13 January – The government accuses opposition groups of staging attacks on Venezuelan diplomatic missions in Portugal, Germany, Spain, Colombia and Costa Rica.
- 29 January – A Cessna Citation 550 jet of the Ministry of Interior, Justice and Peace, crashes on a hill near Cerro El Volcán, in Miranda state, shortly after taking off from Generalissimo Francisco de Miranda Air Base, killing its three crew.
- 31 January – The government releases six Americans imprisoned in Venezuela following a meeting between President Maduro and US presidential envoy Richard Grenell.

=== February ===
- 19 February –
  - The National Electoral Council moves the date of the 2025 Venezuelan parliamentary election from 27 April to 25 May.
  - The United States designates the Tren de Aragua as a terrorist organization.
- 20 February – Canada designates the Tren de Aragua as a terrorist organization.
- 25 February – Pope Francis signs a decree canonizing José Gregorio Hernández, making him the first Catholic saint from Venezuela.
- 26 February – US President Donald Trump revokes Chevron Corporation's permit to operate in Venezuela, citing human rights abuses by President Maduro.

=== March ===
- 1 March – Guyana accuses the Venezuelan Navy of entering its territorial waters and harassing an offshore unit of ExxonMobil.
- 31 March – The government accuses the United States of revoking the operating licenses of several transnational oil and gas companies in Venezuela that were meant to provide exemptions on sanctions imposed by Washington on Caracas.

=== May ===
- 1 May – The International Court of Justice orders Venezuela to stop holding elections for officials to administer areas of Guyana that it claims as part of its territory.
- 7 May –
  - The United States announces the rescue of five Venezuelan opposition politicians who had been sheltering from authorities loyal to President Maduro in the Argentine embassy in Caracas since 2024.
  - Venezuela signs a strategic partnership treaty with Russia.
- 19 May –
  - Venezuela orders a ban on flights from Colombia.
  - The government announces the arrest of 38 people, including 17 foreign nationals, on suspicion of plotting against the government.
- 20 May – Joseph St. Clair, a former US Air Force serviceman imprisoned in Venezuela since November 2024, is released and repatriated following negotiations between the Maduro government and US special envoy Richard Grenell in Antigua and Barbuda.
- 23 May – Opposition politician Juan Pablo Guanipa is arrested on charges of conspiring to sabotage upcoming legislative and local elections.
- 25 May – 2025 Venezuelan parliamentary election: The ruling PSUV retains its majority in the National Assembly of Venezuela and all but one of 24 state governor positions on an official turnout of 42.66%.

=== June ===
- 4 June – US President Donald Trump issues a proclamation imposing partial restrictions on Venezuelan nationals travelling to the United States.
- 10 June – The European Union adds Venezuela to its list of high risk jurisdictions for money laundering and terrorism financing.
- 19 June – Venezuela and Panama announce an agreement to restore consular services following a dispute caused by the 2024 Venezuelan presidential election.
- 24 June – The United States imposes sanctions on Giovanni Vicente Mosquera Serrano, the alleged leader of the Tren de Aragua.
- 25 June – Former General Directorate of Military Counterintelligence chief Hugo Carvajal pleads guilty to drug trafficking charges before a US federal court.

=== July ===
- 1 July – The National Assembly declares Volker Türk, the United Nations High Commissioner for Refugees, persona non grata, citing his failure to protect the rights of Venezuelan migrants deported by the United States to El Salvador.
- 18 July – Ten Americans held in Venezuela are released as part of an exchange with the United States that also sees the release of 252 Venezuelans deported from the US and detained in El Salvador.
- 25 July – The United States designates the Cartel of the Suns as a terrorist organization.
- 27 July – 2025 Venezuelan municipal elections: The ruling PSUV wins 285 of 335 contested mayoralties amid a boycott by opposition groups and an official turnout of 44%.
- 29 July – A Cessna 208B Grand Caravan of the Bolivarian Military Aviation of Venezuela crashes near La Reforma, Amazonas, killing seven of the 10 people on board.

=== August ===
- 7 August – The United States increases its reward for the arrest of President Maduro on drug-trafficking charges from $25 million to $50 million.
- 18 August – The United States deploys three warships along with around 4,000 soldiers to the coast of Venezuela with the stated goal of opposing drug cartels. In response, President Maduro orders the nationwide mobilization of over four million soldiers of the Bolivarian Militia on 20 August.

=== September ===
- 1 September – Operation Southern Spear begins by the U.S. military and surveillance campaign under 47th President Donald Trump.
- 2 September – The United States says it had killed 11 members of the Tren de Aragua in a strike on a drug-smuggling boat off the Caribbean coast of Venezuela.
- 9 September – A relic of Saint Carlo Acutis is stolen from a church in Cardenal Quintero Municipality, Mérida State.
- 13 September – The government accuses the US Navy of illegally boarding and occupying a tuna-fishing vessel in Venezuelan waters for eight hours.
- 15 September – The United States says it had killed three people in a strike on a drug-smuggling boat off the Caribbean coast of Venezuela.
- 24 September –
  - A magnitude 6.2 and 6.3 earthquake hits Zulia State, leaving one person dead from a heart attack.
  - A privately-owned Learjet 55 crashes during takeoff at Simón Bolívar International Airport in Caracas, injuring two passengers.
- 29 September – President Maduro issues a decree allowing him to mobilise the military nationwide and grant it authority over public services and the oil industry in case of an invasion.

=== October ===
- 3 October –
  - The United States says it had killed four people in a strike on a drug-smuggling boat off the Caribbean coast of Venezuela.
  - A Enstrom 480 helicopter of the Bolivarian Military Aviation of Venezuela crashes in Girardot Municipality, Aragua, killing the two crew members on board.
- 6 October – The government announces the discovery of a right-wing plot to stage a false flag attack on the US embassy in Caracas.
- 10 October – Opposition leader María Corina Machado is awarded the Nobel Peace Prize for her efforts to promote democracy in Venezuela. The award is received on her behalf by her daughter, Ana Corina Sosa, on 10 December.
- 13 October –
  - Fourteen people are killed in the collapse of the Cuatro Esquinas de Caratal gold mine in El Callao, Bolívar State following torrential rains.
  - Venezuela closes its embassies in Australia and Norway, and opens new ones in Burkina Faso and Zimbabwe.
- 14 October – The United States says it had killed six people in a strike on a drug-smuggling boat off the Caribbean coast of Venezuela.
- 15 October – US President Donald Trump confirms that he had authorized the Central Intelligence Agency to carry out covert operations inside Venezuela.
- 16 October – The United States says it had captured two people following a strike on a drug-smuggling submarine off the Caribbean coast of Venezuela.
- 19 October – Pope Leo XIV canonizes José Gregorio Hernández and Carmen Elena Rendiles Martínez as the first Catholic saints from Venezuela.

=== November ===
- 16 November – Camilo Castro, a French-Chilean national who was detained in June after entering Venezuela from Colombia, is repatriated to France following diplomatic negotiations.
- 24 November – The United States designates the Cartel of the Suns as a foreign terrorist organization.
- 26 November – The National Institute of Civil Aviation bars six airliners (Iberia, TAP Portugal, Gol, LATAM, Avianca and Turkish Airlines from flying to the country for not complying with an ultimatum to resume flights following warnings of "heightened military activity" by the United States.

=== December ===
- 3 December – The United States imposes sanctions on actress Jimena Romina Araya Navarro, also known as Rosita, for her role in the escape of Tren de Aragua leader Niño Guerrero from the Aragua Penitentiary Center in 2012.
- 9 December – Joropo is recognized as intangible cultural heritage by UNESCO.
- 10 December – The United States Coast Guard boards and seizes a Venezuelan oil tanker off the Venezuelan coast.
- 11 December – The United States imposes sanctions on three of president Maduro's nephews as well as a Panamanian businessman, six firms and six Venezuelan-flagged cargo vessels on suspicion of transporting Venezuelan oil.
- 16 December – US President Donald Trump announces a complete and total blockade of all sanctioned oil tankers going into and out of Venezuela.
- 29 December – President Trump announces an attack by US forces on a Venezuelan dock allegedly being used to load drugs, in the first known US strike on Venezuelan soil.
- 31 December – The United States imposes sanctions on eight Venezuelan entities and oil tankers for helping to fund the Maduro government.

== Holidays ==
- 1 January – New Year's Day
- 3–4 March – Carnival
- 17 April – Maundy Thursday
- 18 April – Good Friday
- 19 April – Declaration of Independence
- 1 May – Labour Day
- 24 June – Battle of Carabobo
- 5 July – Independence Day
- 24 July – Simón Bolívar's Birthday
- 12 October – Day of Indigenous Resistance
- 24 December – Christmas Eve
- 25 December – Christmas Day
- 31 December – New Year's Eve

== Deaths ==
- 17 August – Julio César León, 100, Olympic track cyclist (1948)
- 19 October – Jesús Montero, 35, baseball player (New York Yankees, Seattle Mariners)
- 6 December – Alfredo Díaz Figueroa, 56, politician, governor of Nueva Esparta (2017–2021), heart attack.
