= El Callao mine disaster =

2025 Venezuelan mine disaster

- El Callao Municipality, Bolívar, in Venezuela
- Date: 13 October 2025
- Location: El Callao, Bolívar state, Venezuela
- Deaths: 14+

On 13 October 2025, the Cuatro Esquinas de Caratal gold mine in El Callao, Bolívar state, Venezuela, flooded as a result of heavy rains in the area. The flood resulted in an official death toll of at least 14, although unofficially at least 37 miners died.

The flooding is at least the fourth mining-related disaster to occur in El Callao.

== See also ==
- Orinoco Mining Arc
- Deforestation of the Amazon rainforest
- Bulla Loca mine disaster
