= 2024 in Venezuela =

- Centuries: 19th; 20th; 21st
- Decades: 2000s; 2010s; 2020s
- See also: Other events of 2024; Years in Venezuela; Timeline of Venezuelan history

Event in the year 2024 in Venezuela

== Government ==
- President – Nicolás Maduro
- Vice President – Delcy Rodríguez
- President of the National Assembly – Jorge Rodríguez Gomez
- President of the IV National Assembly of Venezuela – Dinorah Figuera
- Attorney General – Tarek William Saab
- Comptroller of the Republic – Jhosnel Peraza Machado
- Defense Minister – Alfredo José Ruiz Angulo

== Events ==
=== January ===
- January 4 – Canadian company New Stratus Energy Inc. bought a 50% indirect stake in GoldPillar International Fund SPC Ltd., a private fund from the British Virgin Islands, which went on to acquire a 40% equity stake in the company joint venture Petrolera Vencupet S.A., which owns the production rights to the Adas, Lido, Limón, Leona, Oficina Norte and Oficina Central fields, all located in the states of Anzoátegui and Monagas.
- January 5:
  - The Parliament of Venezuela ratified deputy Jorge Rodríguez Gómez as president for a fourth term, Pedro Infante as first vice president and América Pérez as second vice president were also ratified in their positions as part of the board of directors.
  - National Assembly 2015 abroad ratifies the continuity of the board made up of President Dinorah Figuera (Justice First), as well as Marianela Fernández (A New Era) and Auristela Vásquez (AD) as first and second vice president, respectively. The reform of the Transition Statute points out the importance of the 2015 AN "continuing to function until free and transparent elections are called."
- January 8 – The United States Supreme Court of Delaware rejected a request made by Venezuela to review the embargo order against Citgo.
- January 15 – Nicolás Maduro presented his Report and Account corresponding to the year 2023. In his message, Maduro denounced four alleged conspiracies against his regime, which were frustrated last year. He also said that all those involved, civilians and military, both Venezuelan and foreign, are currently detained. Additionally, he announced the increase in the "economic war bonus" starting February 1 that will reach $60 in order to bring the income of the minimum indexed salary in the country at 0 dollars per month with the 40 dollars of the basketticket. The minimum wage in Venezuela will remain at 130 bolivars per month, which is equivalent to about 3.6 dollars.
- January 16 – OFAC extends until April 16 the license that prevents the seizure of Citgo by holders of the PDVSA 2020 Bonds.
- January 17 – Judge Caryslia Rodríguez is sworn in as the new president of the Supreme Tribunal of Justice (TSJ).
- January 19 – Maduro accused the opposition of planning violent actions and called for the activation of the "Bolivarian Fury" plan.
- January 22 – Attorney General Tarek Willian Saab claimed five cases of conspiracy and orders the capture of 14 defendants, among whom were the journalist Sebastiana Barráez, specialized in information on the Armed Forces, and the lawyer and human rights defender Tamara Sujú, who resides outside the country. He also announced arrest warrants for Wender Villalobos and Norbey Marín, and retired soldiers Mario Iván Carratú and José Antonio Colina.
- January 23:
  - The headquarters of the Vente Venezuela, Justice First and Un Nuevo Tiempo parties in five states were vandalized and with graffiti alluding to the "Bolivarian Fury."
  - On the date of the 66th anniversary of the overthrow of the dictatorship of Marcos Pérez Jiménez, María Corina Machado led a rally in Plaza Altamira in which she demanded a date for the presidential elections, as well as the launch of the Grand National Alliance (GANA).
  - Juan Freites, Luis Camacaro and Guillermo López, regional leaders of Vente Venezuela in Vargas, Yaracuy and Trujillo, respectively, were detained.
- January 24 – In a statement, the Armed Forces announces the expulsion of 33 soldiers accused of participating in alleged conspiracies.
- January 25 – Jorge Rodríguez, as head of the negotiating delegation, demands that the facilitators of the negotiation process travel to the country to verify compliance with the Barbados Agreement. However, hours later he declared that "there is no way" for María Corina Machado to be eligible for public office. Maduro confirmed that the agreements were "mortally wounded."
- January 26 – The TSJ announces on its X social network account the responses to the requests for review of disqualifications made in December of last year. The court clears Leocenis García, Richard Mardo and Pablo Pérez, but ratifies the disqualification for Henrique Capriles and María Corina Machado. The candidate elected in the primaries rejected the decision and assured that it will be maintained "until the end."
- January 27:
  - Gerardo Blyde, as head of the opposition delegation in the negotiations, rejected Machado's disqualification and declared that the Unitary Platform ratifies María Corina as a unitary candidate. In response, the coalition denounced the partial violation of the Barbados Agreement to the Norwegian facilitators.
  - Héctor Rodríguez assured that the Government had fully complied with the Agreement, y and that Corina's disqualification was "sound judgement."
- January 28 – The Tiburones de La Guaira win the Venezuelan Professional Baseball League championship for the first time since 1986.
- January 29:
  - María Corina Machado challenges the TSJ ruling and assures that she will remain in the presidential race to confront Maduro, while denouncing the violation of the agreements.
  - Jorge Rodríguez announces that both he and Gerardo Blyde received a communication from Dag Halvor Nylander in which he suggested the formation of the Commission for Monitoring and Verification of the Barbados Agreements, for which they stated that they were ready, and that the Government would remain in the dialogue.
  - OFAC reversed the sanctions relief it had granted last October to the General Mining Company of Venezuela (Minerven).
- January 30:
  - The United States revoked sanctions relief for the Venezuelan gold industry, and would not renew concessions to the oil and natural gas sector following "the actions of Nicolás Maduro and his representatives in Venezuela, including the arrest of members of the democratic opposition and the prohibition of candidates from competing in the 2024 presidential elections, are inconsistent with the agreements signed in Barbados last October.
  - The Government warns of canceling migrant repatriation flights if the United States reimposes sanctions.

=== February ===
- February 15 – The government suspends the operations of the Technical Advisory Office of the United Nations High Commissioner for Human Rights in Venezuela (OHCHR).
- February 20 – The New York Court of Appeals decreed that bonds of the PDVSA are subject to Venezuelan law in agreement with the New York Uniform Commercial Code after five years of litigation, which calls into question the control and guarantee established in the jurisdiction of the United States for the protection of bondholders.
- February 21:
  - Bulla Loca mine disaster – Fourteen people are killed and eleven more injured during the collapse of an illegal gold mine in Angostura Municipality, Bolívar.
  - The Venezuelan Professional Baseball League suspended Jhoulys Chacín for 12 games due to doping.
- February 29 – VII Summit of the Forum of Gas Exporting Countries (FPEG) in Algeria, with the participation of senior production officials from Algeria, Russia, Bolivia and Venezuela.

=== March ===
- March 1 – The International Criminal Court (ICC) denied the Venezuelan government's appeal against resuming the investigation into crimes against humanity
- March 2:
  - Venezuela and Mexico signed an agreement to facilitate the return of Venezuelans who had previously migrated into Mexico.
  - The VII Summit of the Gas Exporting Countries Forum (FPEG) was held in Algeria, with the participation of senior production officials whose organizations account for 70% of global reserves and more than 40% of commercialized production. Minister Pedro Tellechea participated in the Forum, with the participation of six heads of state in Algeria, Qatar, Russia, Iran, Bolivia, Egypt, United Arab Emirates, Equatorial Guinea, Libya, Nigeria, Trinidad and Tobago and Venezuela, as well as Italy as a guest country.
  - Jorge Rodríguez Gómez, president of the National Assembly, reports that he has signed the Caracas Agreement with representatives of various sectors of national life and sectors related to the government with the exception of the Unitary Platform, stating that it develops and replaces the Barbados Agreement . Gómez stated that the new agreement is significantly broader than that of Barbados. However, in the Barbados Agreement, the agreement of the parties is put first because it respects the right of each political actor to select their candidate for the presidential elections freely and in accordance with their internal mechanisms, taking into account what is established in the Constitution.
- March 4 – The government ordered the arrest of actress Marian Valero for allegedly participating in an extortion network which demanded large amounts of money under threat of exposing subjects to public ridicule.
- March 5 – The government announced that presidential elections will be held on July 28 as part of an agreement with the US.
- March 11 – The government released Víctor Venegas, leader of the National Federation of Unions and Colleges of Education Workers in Barinas.
- March 12 – Maduro is selected as the ruling party candidate for the July elections.
- March 20 – Argentina announces a charge against Venezuela before the International Civil Aviation Organization for allegedly violating the Convention on International Civil Aviation after President Nicolás Maduro banned Argentine aircraft from its airspace earlier this month amid traded accusations with President Javier Milei.
- March 27 – Argentina orders the deployment of at least two gendarmerie to the Argentine embassy in Venezuela, where allies of opposition leader María Corina Machado take refuge amid more confrontation between the two countries.

=== April ===
- April 5 – The Venezuelan government announces that it will give safe passage to Argentina to six aides of opposition leader María Corina Machado who are taking refuge in the Argentine embassy in Caracas.
- April 17 – The Biden administration announces that it will reimpose oil sanctions on Venezuela.

=== May ===
- 9 May:
  - The International Cryosphere Climate Initiative announces that Venezuela may be the first nation in modern history to lose all its glaciers after climate scientists downgraded its last one, the Pico Humboldt to an ice field.
  - A Beechcraft Super King Air plane crashes in Lake Maracaibo, killing all eight occupants on board.

=== June ===
- 23 June – A magnitude 6.0 earthquake strikes Sucre, damaging several buildings in Ciudad Guayana.

=== July ===
- 1 July:
  - Larry Álvarez, a cofounder of the crime group Tren de Aragua, is arrested by police in Colombia.
  - One person is killed in Sucre after being swept away by a swollen river during the onslaught of Hurricane Beryl.
- 11 July – The U.S. Treasury Department and the White House announce sanctions on the Venezuelan criminal organization Tren de Aragua and designate it as a "transnational criminal organization." The State Department also places a $12 million reward for information leading to the arrest of the organization's leaders.
- 28 July – 2024 Venezuelan presidential election: Both incumbent president Nicolas Maduro and opposition candidate Edmundo González Urrutia claim victory.
- 29 July –
  - US Secretary of State Antony Blinken states that the U.S. government has "serious concerns" that the Venezuelan election results do not reflect "the will nor the votes of the Venezuelan people" and demands that Venezuelan electoral authorities publish fair and transparent election results, adding that the United States and the international community will "respond accordingly"
  - Venezuela recalls its diplomats in Argentina, Chile, Costa Rica, Dominican Republic, Panama, Peru, and Uruguay after those countries oppose the election results.
  - Panama suspends diplomatic relations with Venezuela and withdraws its diplomatic personnel from the country until a full review of the presidential election results is concluded.
  - The 2024 Venezuelan protests break out.
- 30 July – Freddy Superlano, a leading figure in Venezuela's opposition coalition, is arrested amid the 2024 Venezuelan protests.

=== August ===
- 2 August – Argentina recognizes Edmundo González as President-elect of Venezuela, becoming the third country to do so after the United States and Peru.
- 5 August –
  - The European Union joins the United States and several Latin American nations in refusing to accept the claimed Venezuelan presidential election victory of incumbent President Nicolás Maduro.
  - Brazil becomes the representative of the interests of Argentina and Peru in Venezuela, after Venezuela expels the Argentinian and Peruvian diplomats following tensions in the aftermath of the presidential election.
  - Attorney General Tarek William Saab opens a criminal investigation into opposition officials Edmundo González and María Corina Machado for calling on the Armed Forces to abandon their support for President Maduro throughout the protests and riots in the country.
- 8 August – The Maduro government blocks nationwide access to X for ten days.
- 15 August – The Presidents of Brazil, Colombia, and the United States call for new elections in Venezuela.
- 18 August –
  - An oil spill originating from the El Palito refinery in Puerto Cabello is reported to have contaminated more than 225 km^{2} (87 sq mi) of the Gulf of Paria as well as most of Morrocoy National Park.
  - Opposition officials and supporters gather in cities nationwide to protest against President Maduro and the results of the 2024 presidential election.
- 21 August – The United States drafts a punitive sanctions list of sixty Venezuelan government officials from the country's National Electoral Council, Supreme Court, and counterintelligence police agency for alleged electoral fraud.
- 22 August – The Supreme Court of Venezuela certifies the results of the 2024 Venezuelan presidential election, denying claims that opposition candidate Edmundo González Urrutia won the election.
- 30 August – A major power outage is reported nationwide, with the Maduro government accusing the opposition of responsibility.

=== September ===
- 3 September – Authorities issue an arrest warrant against Edmundo González on charges related to the presidential election.
- 4 September – President Maduro announces that Venezuela will celebrate an early Christmas in October.
- 6 September – The Bolivarian National Intelligence Service surrounds the Argentine embassy in Caracas after several opposition members take refuge inside. Electricity is reportedly cut to the embassy with Vente Venezuela describing the situation as a siege.
- 7 September – The Maduro government revokes Brazil's authority to represent Argentina's interests in Venezuela and its stewardship over the Argentine embassy in Caracas.
- 8 September – Edmundo González flees Venezuela to seek political asylum in Spain. The Spanish government says González departed Venezuela on a Spanish Air Force plane at his own request.
- 12 September – The United States government imposes sanctions on 16 allies of president Maduro, accusing them of voter suppression and human rights abuses.
- 14 September – Authorities arrest two Spaniards, three Americans, and a Czech for allegedly planning to destabilize the country. Both the U.S. and Spain deny the claims.
- 21 September – The European Parliament recognizes Edmundo González as President of Venezuela.
- 23 September – A court in Caracas issues arrest warrants against Argentine president Javier Milei, Milei's sister and adviser Karina Milei and Security Minister Patricia Bullrich over the seizure of a Venezuelan aircraft in Buenos Aires due to sanctions violations. The warrant is followed by an arrest order from an Argentine federal court against President Maduro, Interior Minister Diosdado Cabello and several other Venezuelan officials for crimes against humanity.

=== October ===
- 17 October – Authorities arrest three Americans, a Bolivian and a Peruvian for allegedly planning to destabilize the country.
- 21 October – Former petroleum and industry minister Pedro Tellechea is arrested on suspicion of working with the United States to undermine the state oil company PDVSA.
- 30 October – Venezuela recalls its ambassador to Brazil in protest over the latter's blocking of Caracas' application to join the BRICS economic bloc.

=== November ===
- 27 November – The US imposes sanctions on 21 Venezuelan officials linked with the suppression of protests against the July election.

=== December ===
- 2 December – The Inter-American Court of Human Rights rules that the Venezuelan government violated the human rights of former presidential candidate Henrique Capriles for undermining the integrity of the 2013 Venezuelan presidential election in favor of the incumbent Nicolas Maduro.
- 30 December – The Supreme Tribunal of Justice issues a $10 million fine to TikTok over its role in promoting hazardous challenges involving the ingestion of chemical substances that left three adolescents dead and 200 others injured in Venezuela.

== Anniversaries ==
- January 1: 120 years since the founding of El Impulso.
- January 16: 30 years since the Venezuelan banking crisis of 1994.
- February 1: 300 years since the founding of Calabozo.
- February 12:
- 210 years since the Battle of Vitoria.
- 10 years since the start of the 2014 Venezuelan protests.
- March 23: 170 years since the abolition of slavery in the country.
- March 28: 160 years since the 1864 Constitution of Venezuela.
- March 30: 220 years since the introduction of the smallpox vaccine in the country (Balmis Expedition)
- April 6: 60 years since the Esso Maracaibo tanker accident.
- April 9: 120 years since the legalization of divorce in Venezuela.
- April 10: 190 years since the Freedom of Contracts Law.
- April 27: 120 years since the Constitution of Venezuela of 1904.
- April 28: 130 years since the Great Andes Earthquake.
- May 11: 280 years since the El Tocuyo Rebellion.
- May 22: 260 years since the founding of Ciudad Bolívar.
- July 6: 210 years since the 1814 Caracas Exodus.
- July 31: 110 years since the Zumaque I blowout.
- August 15: 20 years since the 2004 recall referendum.
- August 23: 60 years since the La Llovizna Tragedy.
- September 7: 210 years since the Carúpano Manifesto.
- September 19:
- 110 years since the Alma Llanera.
- 40 years since the Tazón Massacre.
- October 1: 50 years since the founding of the National Art Gallery.
- October 20: 150 years since the Coro Revolution.
- November 10: 10 years since the Altagracia Massacre.
- November 18: 20 years since the murder of Danilo Anderson.
- December 5: 210 years since the Battle of Urica.
- December 9: 100 years since the founding of Puerto Ayacucho.

== Sports ==
=== National ===
==== Baseball ====
Venezuelan Professional Baseball League: Tiburones de La Guaira (8th title).

==== Cycling ====
Return to Táchira 2024: (Ecuador) Jonathan Caicedo

== Music ==
=== Concerts ===
- January 18: SoulSound
- February 12: Luis Miguel
- March 9: Cardellino
- March 22: Karol G
- August 30: Florencia Bertotti

== Prizes ==
=== National ===
- Venezuelan Professional Baseball League
  - Pitcher of the Year: Osmer Morales
  - LVBP Rookie of the Year: Andrés Chaparro
  - Manager of the Year: José Moreno ("cheo")
  - Closer of the Year: Antony Vizcaya
  - Comeback of the Year: Osmer Morales
  - Setup of the Year: Miguel Socolovich

== Deaths ==
- 6 January: Anna Strasberg, 84, Venezuelan-born American actress (Strange Invasion, Riot on Sunset Strip, The Fortunate Pilgrim).
- 12 February: Zdenko Morovic, 57, Yugoslav-born Venezuelan footballer (Deportivo Italia, national team).
- 20 February: Teresa Selma, 93, actress (Ladrón de corazones),
- 2 April: Juan Vicente Pérez, 114, supercentenarian, world's oldest living man (since 2022).
