= Monumento a la Virgen de la Paz =

Statue in Trujillo, Venezuela

Coordinates: 9°20′55″N 70°27′43″W

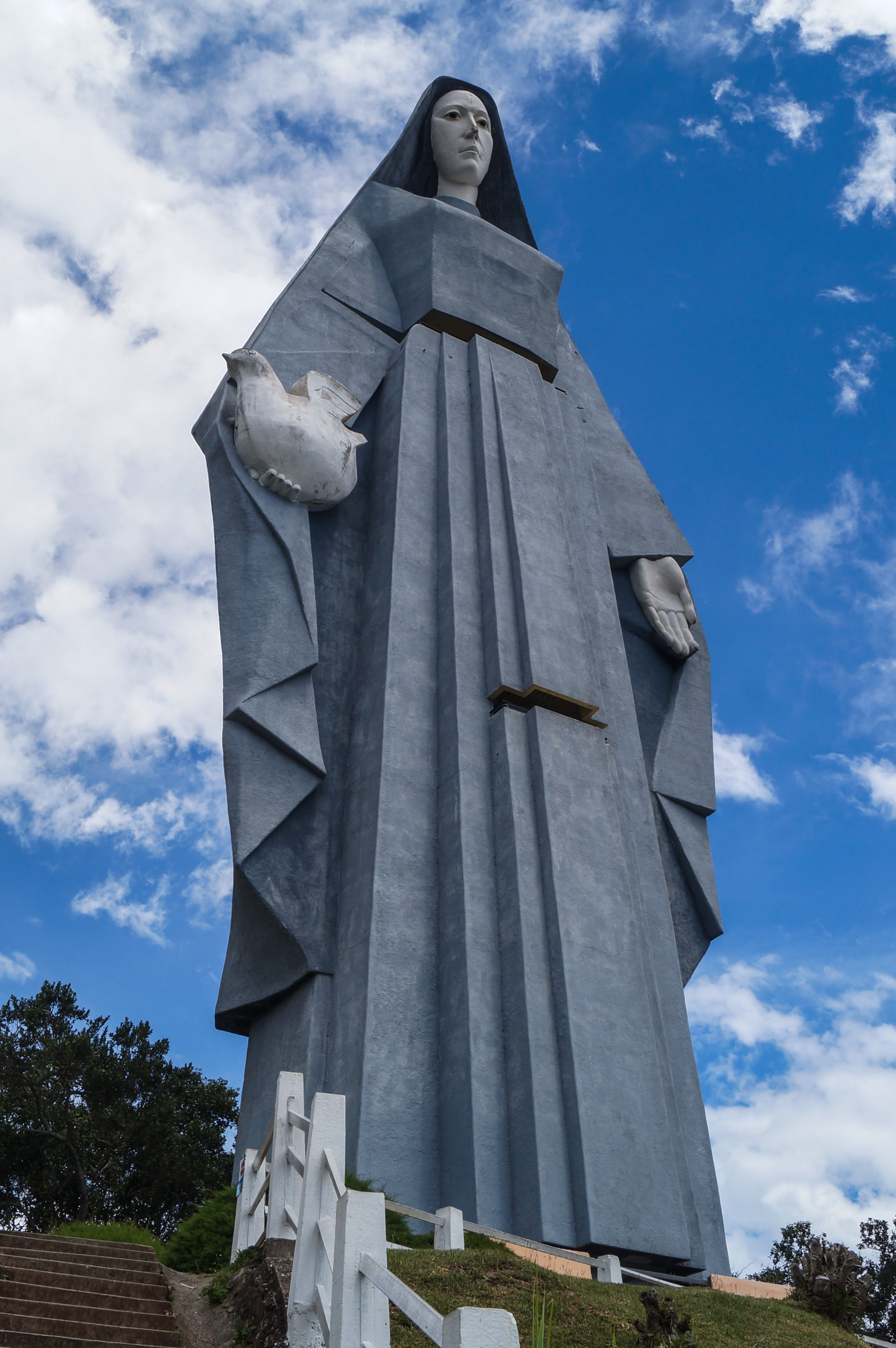
- Artist: Manuel de la Fuente, Rosendo Camargo
- Year: 1983
- Type: Modern architecture; concrete and steel
- Dimensions: 46.72 metres (153.3 ft) high
- Location: Trujillo, Trujillo, Venezuela

The Monumento a la Virgen de la Paz is a colossal statue honoring Mary. Completely made out of concrete, it is located 11 kilometres (6.8 mi) southwest of the city of Trujillo in Venezuela. At 46.72 metres (153.3 ft) tall it is the 48th tallest statue in the world, the tallest statue in South America and the second-tallest in the Americas, (Note: This source, from 2010, says it is the tallest statue in Latin America. In 2014, a taller statue was constructed in Mexico.) the fourth-tallest statue depicting a woman in the world, and the second tallest statue of Mary in the world. It is 16 metres (52 ft) across, with a base that is 18 metres (59 ft) deep, and weighs 1,200 tonnes.

It was designed by the Spanish-Venezuelan sculptor Manuel de la Fuente and opened on 21 December 1983 by President Luis Herrera Campins. The monument stands at about 1,600 metres (5,200 ft) above sea level, in the region named Peña de la Virgen — where it is said that the virgin appeared in the year 1570. From the monument there are spectacular panoramic views of the region: on a clear day, one can see all of the state of Trujillo, parts of the Sierra Nevada de Mérida, and the south coast of Lake Maracaibo.

Since 1568 the virgin of Nuestra Señora de la Paz (Our Lady of Peace) has been the spiritual patron of Trujillo; since 1960 she has been the patron of this diocese, as well. The dove in the statue's right hand symbolizes the responsibility of the presidency of Venezuela to make peace across the land. For many years the statue was administered through a private foundation, before passing to the directorship of the government of the state of Trujillo.

Despite its colossal size and the importance of its commemorative symbolism of the patron saint of the state, the monument is one of the least visited tourist spots in Trujillo and in Venezuela. In Easter 2010 the Trujillo government reported 11,000 visitors to the monument, while the José Gregorio Hernández sanctuary received close to 80,000 visits, and the traditional way of the cross in the town of Tostós was visited by approximately 57,000 tourists.

== History ==
The Trujillo area has been relevant in the Christian mysticism beliefs of the inhabitants of the lands around the monument since colonial times. The Virgin of Peace is the patron saint of the state of Trujillo, and the state flag has a green triangle, in its center a white star and inside the star the silhouette of a dove, a symbol of peace. The three sides of the triangle represent a triad of monuments, two of them religious:

1. The national monument of the Meeting of Bolívar and Morillo in Santa Ana, on the occasion of the Armistice Treaty and Regularization of War
2. The Cathedral Señor Santiago de Nuestra Señora de La Paz, finished in 1662, and where the precious image of Our Lady of Peace was venerated in the 16th century. It is also on the coat of arms of the city and the state, and is where Bishop Lasso de La Vega welcomed Bolívar and entrusted him to divine providence on 1 March 1821
3. The Monumento a la Virgen de la Paz, an appeal to world peace

=== Virgen de la Paz ===
The origins of the image of the Virgin of Peace probably dates back to the 7th century, associated with Saint Ildefonsus of Toledo (606-667), an archbishop of Toledo, Spain, noted for his devotion to the Virgin Mary. Tradition relates that on a December night, Ildefonsus entered the Cathedral of Santa María de Toledo and witnessed a great illumination inside the temple, purporting to see the Virgin sitting in the archbishop's chair, which has been interpreted as divine approval of Ildefonsus' teachings.

The area of Trujillo where the monument is now erected was inhabited by an indigenous society known as Eskuke. It was the site of an indigenous uprising led by the Cacique Pitijoc, of the Cuicas ethnic group against the Spanish colonists. The indigenous people were defeated, and Trujillo was founded in 1557, with the belief of the Virgin of Peace introduced to replace the indigenous goddess Ikake.

=== The legend ===
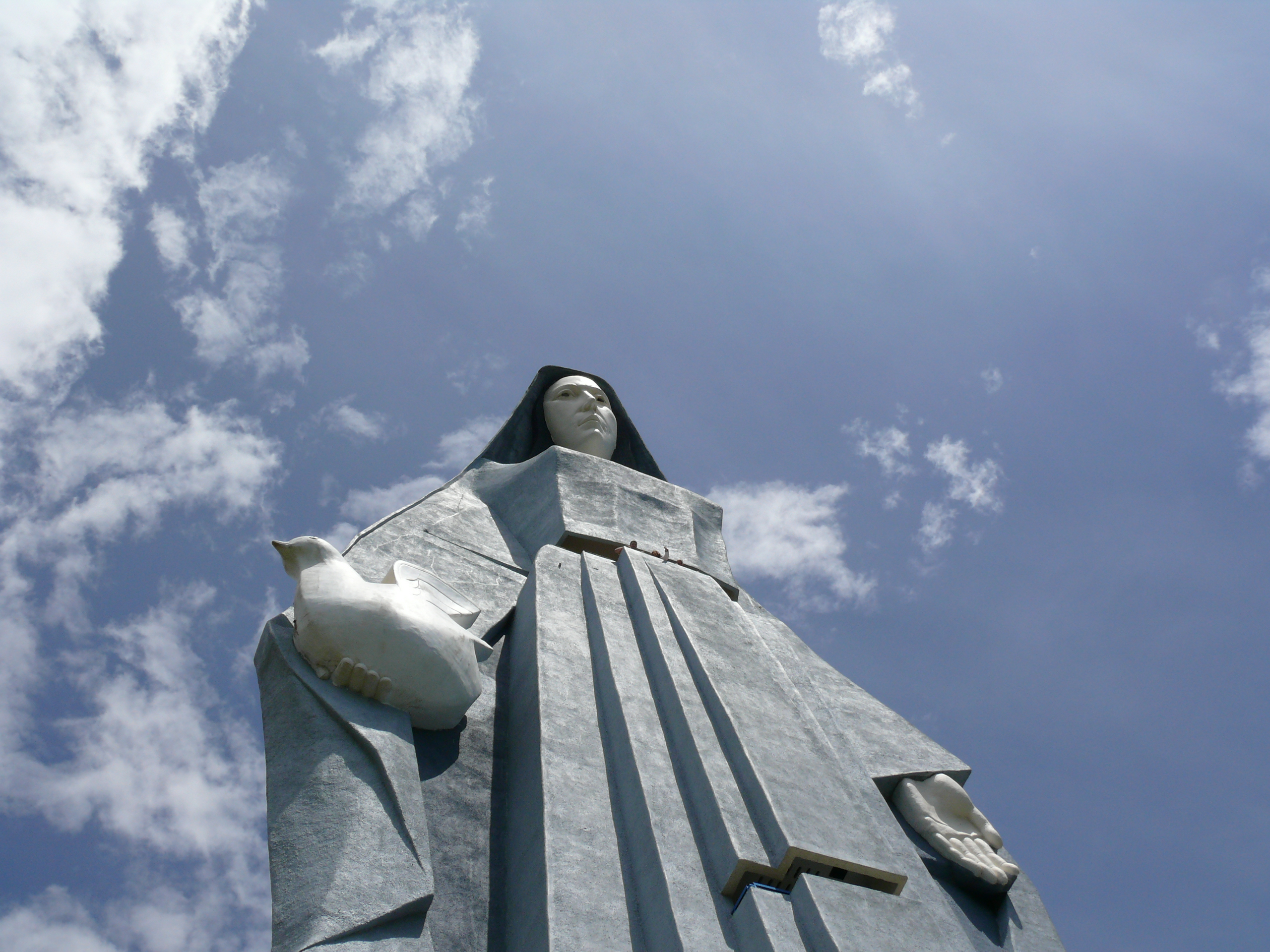
Monumento a la Virgen de la Paz

The name of the monument, the place and the Virgin all refer to the legend of her appearance. On the hill called Peña de la Virgen, according to legend from the late 1550s, the image of the Virgin Mary appeared to several residents of the town of Carmona. With unique features and a youthful spirit, the young woman appeared walking in the afternoons to buy candles for her hearth, and it was in a grocery store where some men asked her why she was alone; she answered that she was "not alone, but with God, the sun and the stars", or "children, don't forget that I walk with God, my protector". As they followed her, the locals saw her hide behind a rock that began to spark, discovering that she was not a mortal young woman but that she was the Virgin Mary.

=== Monumento a la Paz ===
The construction of the monument began as an idea of First Lady of Venezuela Betty Urdaneta de Herrera Campins, who was from Trujillo, and the state governor Dora Maldonado de Falcón.

On 21 December 1983, during the bicentennial year of the birth of Simón Bolívar, the Monumento a la Virgin de la Paz was inaugurated, with the liturgical blessing of the newly ordained cardinal José Alí Lebrún Moratinos. The statue shows the Virgin Mary in a blue robe, and its construction had lasted 18 months, carried out by the sculptor Manuel de la Fuente and the engineer Rosendo Camargo, with support of Juan Francisco Hernández. The monument sits on a steel structure, which includes the skeleton of the hollow concrete sculpture. It has a weight of 1,200 tonnes spread over 46 meters high, of which 8 tonnes is the weight of the head alone. The cost of the monument was 9 million bolívares.

Despite the fact that Pope John Paul II never visited Trujillo, the dedication of the monument was attended by the Venezuelan ambassador to the Holy See, Luciano Noguera Mora, and was accompanied by a television message from the Pope that was broadcast to the Venezuelan Catholic community.

In the speech that the Trujillan writer Mario Briceño Perozo gave during the dedication of the monument, when referring to the tradition of going up to the Peña de la Virgen, he said:

Los alrededores de la peña ofrecían una vegetación exuberante. Los cafetales empapados de rocío bajo la protección de los altos bucares coronados de púrpura silvestre. Y a ambos lados del sendero de musgo, los helechos, el estoraque y las pascuitas que bajarán a la ciudad a perfumar el pesebre casero.

The surroundings of the rock offered lush vegetation. The dew-soaked coffee plantations under the protection of the high bucares crowned with wild purple. And on both sides of the moss path are the ferns, the storax and the Easter pastries that will go down to the city to perfume the homemade manger.

== Cult of the Virgen de la Paz ==
The monument demonstrates how architectural discourse is capable of generating a discursive synergy between nature-statement and religious statement, capable of leading the observer to a special state of perception of the sacred.

The patron fairs in honor of the Virgen de la Paz are held in Trujillo on 24 January, often lasting until 30 January. During the festivities, the monument is treated as one of the most religious places in the state, with masses and processions, as well as gastronomic, cultural and recreational fairs at the site; these often extend to La Plazuela and Isnotú.

Dozens of parishioners also gather at the Peña de la Virgen each year for Easter, praying in the attached church. The "Peace March", which takes place every year during Easter, starts early in the morning from the headquarters of the Catholic Seminary in the city of Trujillo and ends with a mass in the monument's chapel.

== Viewpoints ==
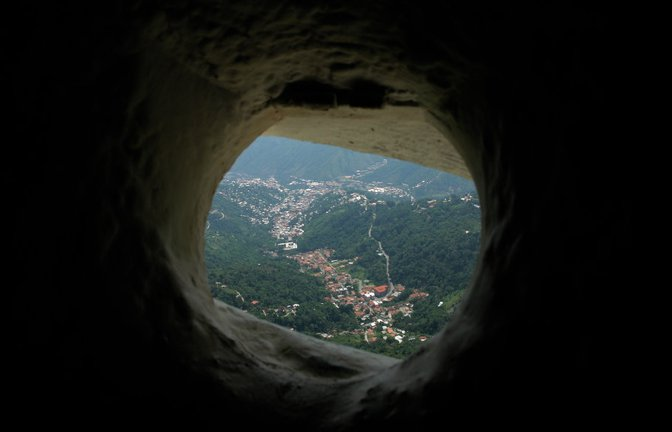
View through one of the eyes of the monument.

The monument fulfills the function of an extraordinary viewpoint: ascending inside the statue, using stairs that fill the entire interior of the statue, visitors can stop at each of the five viewpoints or lookouts: one for each cardinal direction, and a fifth from the statue's eyes.

First lookout: located at the level of the Virgin's knee, 18 meters from the base, which is accessed by a mechanical elevator. From this height you can see the city of Trujillo.

Second lookout: located in the left hand of the statue, 4 meters above the first lookout, you can see the city of Trujillo and its surroundings, including the Llanos de Monay, the Agua Viva reservoir, Betijoque, Motatán, and rural parts of Pampanito and Isnotú. It is accessible by wide steps.

Third lookout: located in the right hand of the statue, 26 meters up. The Teta de Niquitao can be seen from this height, which at 4,006 metres (13,143 ft) high is the highest point in the state of Trujillo.

Fourth lookout: located at the waist level of the statue, at 28 meters high, which can also be reached by elevator. From here, more distant sights can be seen, including La Ceiba, the eastern shore of Lake Maracaibo, the ridges of the Sierra Nevada de Mérida, various plains and much of the land from Trujillo to the state of Lara.

Fifth lookout: located in the eyes of the Virgin, 44 meters high, this lookout the most extensive and impressive view. It is reached by more than 200 wide steps.

In addition to the viewpoints, the monument consists of a chapel and a bell tower, which rings out every half hour. The dome of the chapel is decorated with a stained glass window. In the center of this, a dove appears surrounded by luminous colors that allude to the spiritual splendor of the symbol.

=== Cave of the Virgin of Peace ===
Lower down the mountain than the Peña de la Virgen, to one side of the monument, there is a group of publicly accessible caves collectively known as Cuevas de la Peña de la Virgen II (Caves of the Peña de la Virgen II). Local folklore says that the caves are interconnected and that the indigenous people of the past used them not only for their religious ceremonies but also to travel through the state. Other caves complexes nearby include the Cuevas de la Peña de la Virgen I, Cueva El Zamurito and Cueva El Ronco. The movements of the Andes over the centuries will have closed whatever connected passageways were supposedly present. The followers of the Virgin frequently visit these caves, often in religious processions, and give offerings and candles at the site.

== See also ==
Approximate heights of various notable statues: 1. Statue of Unity 240 m (790 ft) (incl. 58 m (190 ft) base); 2. Spring Temple Buddha 153 m (502 ft) (incl. 25 m (82 ft) pedestal and 20 m (66 ft) throne); 3. Statue of Liberty (Liberty Enlightening the World) 93 m (305 ft) (incl. 47 m (154 ft) pedestal); 4. The Motherland Calls 87 m (285 ft) (incl. 2 m (6 ft 7 in) pedestal); 5. Christ the Redeemer 38 m (125 ft) (incl. 8 m (26 ft) pedestal); 6. Michelangelo's David 5.17 m (17.0 ft) (excl. 2.5 m (8 ft 2 in) plinth)

- List of tallest statues
- Virgin of El Panecillo
