= Saint Carmen =

Saint Carmen may refer to:

- Carmen Salles y Barangueras (1848–1911), Spanish Catholic saint and religious sister
- Carmen Elena Rendiles Martínez (1903–1977), Venezuelan Catholic saint and religious sister
