= 2026 in Venezuela =

- Centuries: 19th; 20th; 21st
- Decades: 2000s; 2010s; 2020s
- See also: Other events of 2026; Years in Venezuela; Timeline of Venezuelan history

Events in the year 2026 in Venezuela.

== Government ==
- President – Nicolás Maduro (de facto until 3 January); Delcy Rodríguez (de facto since 3 January, acting since 5 January)
- Vice President – Delcy Rodríguez (until 5 January); Vacant (since 5 January)
- President of the National Assembly – Jorge Rodríguez
- President of the IV National Assembly of Venezuela – Dinorah Figuera

== Holidays ==
- 1 January – New Year's Day
- 16-17 February – Carnival
- 2 April – Maundy Thursday
- 3 April – Good Friday
- 19 April – Declaration of Independence
- 1 May – Labour Day
- 24 June – Battle of Carabobo
- 5 July – Independence Day
- 24 July – Simón Bolívar's Birthday
- 12 October – Day of Indigenous Resistance
- 24 December – Christmas Eve
- 25 December – Christmas Day
- 31 December – New Year's Eve

== Events ==
=== January ===
- 3 January —
  - The United States carries out airstrikes in Caracas and multiple states of Venezuela, prompting the Maduro government to declare a state of national emergency. US President Donald Trump later announces that Maduro and his wife Cilia Flores had been captured and flown out of the country amid charges of narcoterrorism. Trump then indicates that the United States plans to run Venezuela until there is a "safe, proper and judicious transition".
  - The Supreme Tribunal of Justice orders vice president Delcy Rodríguez to assume the presidency in the absence of Maduro.
- 5 January —
  - Delcy Rodríguez is sworn in as acting president.
  - The Swiss government imposes a four-year freeze on any assets held by president Maduro and his close associates in Switzerland.
- 8 January – Announcement of the 2026 political prisoner release in Venezuela
- 12 January – The government announces the release of 112 political prisoners.
- 22 January – The government releases Rafael Tudares Bracho, the son-in-law of opposition leader Edmundo González Urrutia who had been detained since January 2025.
- 29 January — President Rodríguez signs a law allowing the entry of private companies in the production and sale Venezuelan oil.

=== February ===
- 6–22 February – Venezuela at the 2026 Winter Olympics
- 8 February – Juan Pablo Guanipa, the leader of the opposition Justice First party, is arrested in Caracas hours after being released from prison.
- 10 February – Venezuela delivers its first crude oil shipment to Israel in several years.
- 20 February –
  - President Rodriguez signs a new amnesty law.
  - Around 214 political prisoners detained at the Rodeo I prison launch a hunger strike demanding their release under the new amnesty law.
- 25 February –
  - The United States allows the export of Venezuelan oil to Cuba for humanitarian purposes.
  - Tarek William Saab resigns as attorney-general, but is immediately appointed as interim Ombudsman by the National Assembly following the resignation of Alfredo Ruiz.

=== March ===
- 5 March – The United States and Venezuela agree to re-establish diplomatic and consular relations.
- 7 March – At the Shield of the Americas summit, U.S. president Trump says that the United States formally recognizes the government of Delcy Rodríguez.
- 12 March – The International Criminal Court withdraws a crimes against humanity investigation on US sanctions on Venezuela, citing lack of evidence.
- 14 March – The US embassy in Caracas reopens.
- 17 March – Venezuela wins the World Baseball Classic for the first time after defeating the United States 3-2.
- 18 March – President Rodríguez appoints General Gustavo González López as Minister of Defense, replacing General Vladimir Padrino López who has served since 2014.

=== April ===
- 25 April – A bus falls into a ravine in Cardenal Quintero, Mérida, killing 12 people and injuring three.
- 30 April – Commercial flights between the US and Venezuela resume for the first time since 2019.

=== May ===
- 16 May – Maduro associate Alex Saab is deported to the United States.
- 24 May – Clashes break out between inmates and security forces at the Injuba prison in Barinas following protests against abuses by prison administrators.

=== June ===
- 13 June – US President Donald Trump announces that an American strike killed Niño Guerrero, the leader of the Venezuelan transnational organized crime syndicate Tren de Aragua. Trump states that the military action was coordinated with president Rodriguez.
- 24 June – A doublet earthquake measuring 7.2 and 7.5 respectively hits near Morón, killing at least 2,295 people.
- 29 June – A rig explosion injures eight workers in Caracas.

=== July ===
- 24 July:
  - Venezuela withdraws from the International Criminal Court citing "geographical bias" and disproportionate targeting of countries in the Global South, particularly in Africa and Latin America.
  - The United States imposes a 12.5% tariff on Venezuela, citing the presence of alleged forced labor in the supply chain.

=== August ===
- 11 August – Israel and Venezuela resume consular relations for the first time since 2009.
- 29 August – US President Donald Trump declares that the US reached an agreement with Venezuela to control 65 billion barrels of the latter's oil reserves.

=== October ===
- 9 October – Authorities approve Starlink's licenses to operate in Venezuela.

=== November ===
- 16 November – For the first time since 2009, a Venezuelan delegation arrives in Israel.

== Deaths ==
- 22 January – Walter Martínez, 84, Uruguayan-born war correspondent.
- 7 February – Nora Uribe, 87–88, politician and diplomat, minister of communication and information (2002–2003).
- 12 June – Niño Guerrero, 42, drug lord, leader of Tren de Aragua.
- 24 June –
  - Yimvert Berroterán, 18, footballer (Universidad Central de Venezuela)
  - Yorgelis Delgado, 43, actress
  - Milagros Eulate, 63, politician, deputy (since 2016)
  - Gabriela Fleritt, 55, actress, radio announcer, and comedian
  - Isabel Jara, 69, civil servant, delegate of the Government of the Canary Islands (since 2023)
  - María Clemencia López, 85–86, diplomat
  - Richard Peñalver, 62, politician (Llaguno Overpass events)
  - Willner Rivas, 31, volleyball player (national team)
  - Carlos Silva Amarista, engineer, president of the Caracas Metro
  - Van Der Dijs, heavy metal rock band, all members (Manuel van Der Dijs, Gabriel Gómez, Xander Hernández, Abraham Foucault)
- 18 July – Zdeněk Chovanec, 21, racing driver (FIA Formula 3).
- 30 July – Timoteo Hikmat Beylouni, 80, Syrian-born Syriac Catholic hierarch, apostolic exarch of Venezuela (since 2011).
- 12 August –
  - Tulio Ramírez Padilla, 66, Roman Catholic prelate, auxiliary bishop of Caracas (2012–2020) and bishop of Guarenas (since 2020).
  - Chelo Rodríguez, 84, actress
