= Esso Maracaibo =

Esso Maracaibo may refer to:

- MV Esso Maracaibo, name used from 1947 to 1956 for the former USS Narraguagas (AOG-32)
- SS Esso Maracaibo, launched in 1959
