= General Rafael Urdaneta Bridge =

Bridge in Venezuela

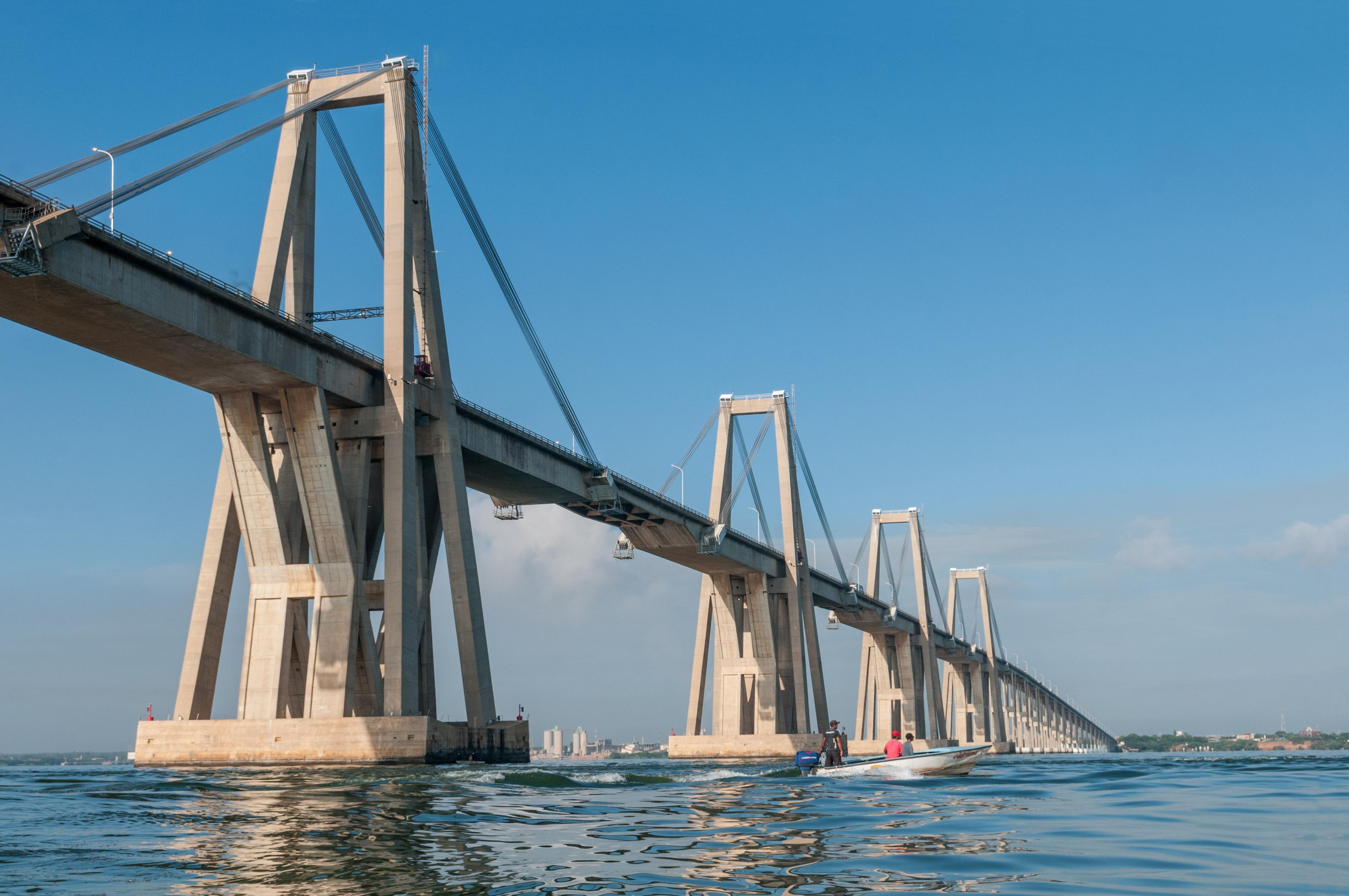
- Coordinates: 10°34′27.38″N 71°34′33.73″W
- Carries: vehicles
- Crosses: Tablazo Strait
- Locale: Maracaibo, Zulia, Venezuela
- Other name(s): Lake Maracaibo Bridge, The Lake Bridge

Characteristics
- Design: Cable-stayed bridge
- Material: Reinforced concrete
- Total length: 8.7 kilometres (5.4 mi)
- Height: 86.6 metres (284 ft)
- Longest span: 235 metres (771 ft) x 5
- No. of spans: 135

History
- Designer: Riccardo Morandi
- Construction start: 1958
- Construction end: 1962
- Construction cost: Bs. 350 million

Location
- Interactive map of General Rafael Urdaneta Bridge

The General Rafael Urdaneta Bridge is located at the Tablazo Strait outlet of Lake Maracaibo, in western Venezuela. The bridge connects Maracaibo with much of the rest of the country. It is named after General Rafael Urdaneta, a Venezuelan hero of Independence who was born in Maracaibo. It is one of the largest bridges of its kind in the world, the second longest in Latin America after the Rio–Niterói Bridge (13 km), and ranks 80th among the longest bridges in the world.

== Design and construction ==
Made of reinforced and prestressed concrete, the cable-stayed bridge spans 8.678 kilometres (5.392 mi) from shore to shore. The five main spans are each 235 metres (771 ft) long. They are supported from 92-metre (302 ft) tall towers, and provide 46 metres (151 ft) of clearance to the water below. The bridge carries only vehicles.

The competition to design the bridge started in 1957 and was won by Juan Francisco Otaola Pavan and his partner Oscar Benedetti, Venezuelan civil engineers and owners of Precomprimido C.A., with the design of Riccardo Morandi, an Italian civil engineer. While Morandi designed the bridge, it was Otaola and Benedetti who made the structural and budget calculations, which in part with Otaola's demand for the project to be done by at least 50% of Venezuelan companies and workforce, secured the winning bid for the Venezuelan government. Precomprimido's was the only concrete design out of twelve entries, and was expected to be less expensive to maintain, as well as providing valuable experience of prestressed concrete technology for Venezuela. Precomprimido's construction was aided by several international companies, primarily Julius Berger as well as Grün & Bilfinger, Bauboag AG, Philipp Holzmann AG, Wayss & Freytag and K Ingeniería.

According to eminent bridge engineer Michel Virlogeux:

the Lake Maracaibo Bridge deserves to be part of the series of the most famous bridges over the world, with the Golden Gate Bridge, the bridge over the Firth of Forth, the Brooklyn Bridge, and the Garabit Viaduct.

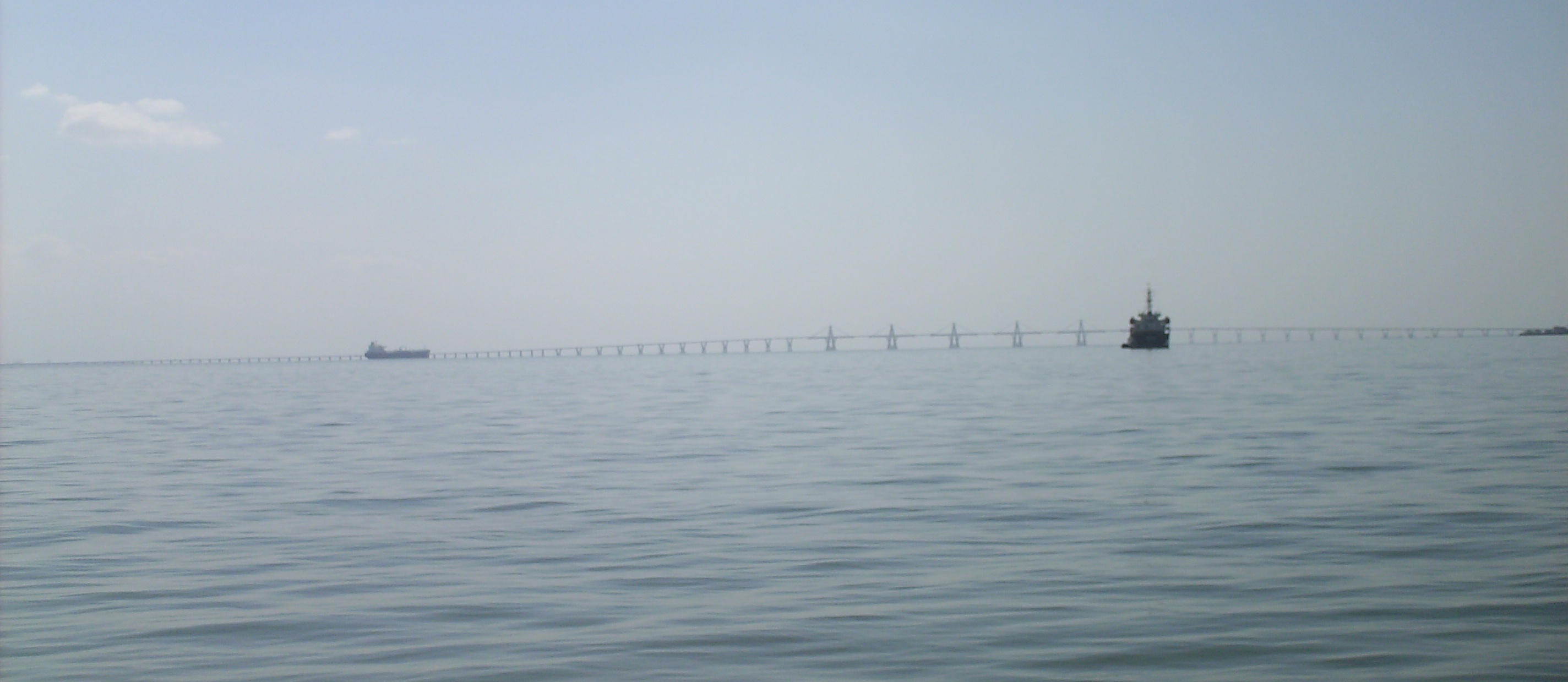
General Rafael Urdaneta Bridge panoramic

== History ==
It was opened on 24 August 1962 by the then-president of Venezuela Romulo Betancourt.

In April 1964, parts of the bridge collapsed after a collision with the tanker Esso Maracaibo, causing the deaths of seven people.

In 1979, the cables at pylon 22 snapped due to corrosion; a complicating factor was that the failed cables were located in the bottom layer of the saddle, making their replacement impossible. The government of the time—following the logical course of action—contracted the original designers and builders, leading the firms Precomprimido C.A. and Wayss & Freytag A.G. to devise a rescue plan and a definitive solution on the fly. The final solution was designed by Dr. Juan Otaola; it called for a simplified cable replacement method using a "comb-type" saddle and larger-diameter cables capable of temporarily bearing the load during any future replacement, thereby ensuring greater safety. This solution was published in the ASCE journal *Civil Engineering* (Vol. 52, No. 9, September 1982).

The construction of a second cable-stayed bridge has been proposed since 1982, with a series of studies made since 2000. The cost of the new bridge has been estimated at US$440m, to be largely privately financed via tolls.

The bridge's structural integrity received heightened concern after the August 2018 collapse of a stayed pier on a similar bridge, Ponte Morandi in Genoa, Italy. Both bridges were designed by Riccardo Morandi.

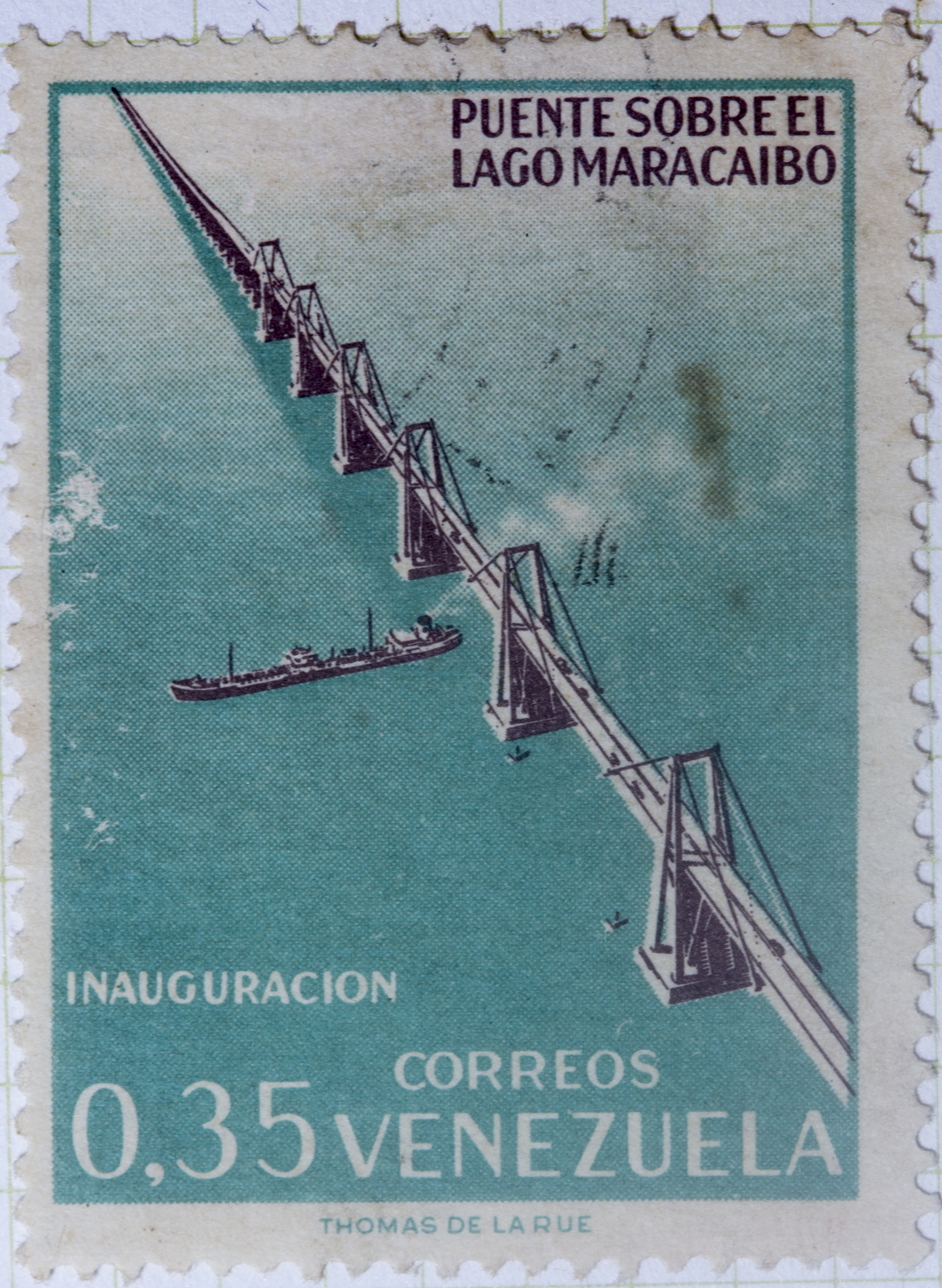
Commemorative Stamp

== See also ==
- List of bridges by length
