= Calypso de El Callao =

Venezuelan festival

The Venezuelan festival known in Spanish as Calypso de El Callao (calypso of El Callao) is held every year in Bolívar state, during carnival celebrations. It is a fusion of Trinidad and Tobago calypso music, Caribbean traditions and Venezuelan folklore.

== History ==
During the 19th century Trinidadians, Grenadians, and other Caribbean, islanders began migration to Venezuela, particularly to the city of El Callao to work in the gold mines. They brought the music of Calypso with them, which later became very popular in the city. The folk music is a mixture of Venezuelan and Caribbean genres and is sung in Spanish and/or Caribbean English. It is closely associated with the Carnival festival, a tradition also brought by the West Indian people.

== Performance ==
In the carnival months of February and March, Calypso is performed with competitions, where the winners are crowned Calypso King and Queen. Calypso or as the town's people call it "Calipso" is one of a popular cultural tradition. Popular instruments used in the performance of the music are the drums, cuatro, maracas, guitar, bandolin, violin and the steel drum.
