= 2023 in Venezuela =

- Centuries: 19th; 20th; 21st
- Decades: 2000s; 2010s; 2020s
- See also: Other events of 2023; Years in Venezuela; Timeline of Venezuelan history

The following lists events of the year 2023 in Venezuela.

== Incumbents ==
- President: Nicolás Maduro
- Vice President: Delcy Rodríguez

=== Governors ===
- Amazonas: Miguel Rodríguez
- Anzoátegui: Luis José Marcano Salazar
- Apure: Eduardo Piñate
- Aragua: Rodolfo Clemente Marco Torres and Daniela González
- Barinas: Sergio Garrido
- Bolívar: Ángel Bautista Marcano
- Carabobo: Rafael Lacava
- Cojedes: José Alberto Galíndez
- Delta Amacuro: Lizeta Hernández
- Falcón: Víctor Clark
- Guárico: José Manuel Vásquez
- Lara: Adolfo Pereira Antique
- Mérida: Jehyson Guzmán
- Miranda: Héctor Rodríguez
- Monagas: Yelitza Santaella and Cosme Arzolay
- Nueva Esparta: Morel Rodríguez Ávila
- Portuguesa: Rafael Calles
- Sucre: Gilberto Pinto Blanco
- Táchira: Freddy Bernal
- Trujillo: Gerardo Marquez
- Vargas: José Alejandro Terán
- Yaracuy: Julio León Heredia
- Zulia: Manuel Rosales

== Events ==
Ongoing — COVID-19 pandemic in Venezuela

=== January ===
- 1 January - Colombia and Venezuela agrees to reopen the last remaining border that has been previously blocked by authorities due to worsening ties.
- 3 January:
  - The loading of 250 thousand barrels of heavy crude oil to the oil tanker "Beauty One" began, bound for the United States from the oil port of Zulia, being the first export in four years that goes to a refinery in that country.
  - The exemption from payment of the IVA tax and import duty of 1,567 tariff items was extended until June 29.
- 5 January:
  - Juan Guaidó's interim government dissolves.
  - Jorge Rodriguez Gomez is ratified as the president of the 2020 National Assembly. Pedro Infante was appointed vice president of the national assembly, and America Perez was appointed second vice president. Rosalva Gil was appointed as secretary.
  - Policed leveled the ZPG cultural center, headquarters of a group accused of, among other things, torture and sexual slavery in Guacara, which was initially financed by the government, who believed it was a music production project. This project included a cafe, a recording studio, a meeting and relaxation space on an abandoned office lot owned by Cantv.
- 6 January - The new president of the PDVSA, appointed by Nicolas Madura, was announced to be the colonel Pedro Tellechea, replacing Asdrubal Chavez.
- 8 January - January 8: The attorney general of Venezuela announces arrest warrants against several former deputies elected to the National Assembly in 2015.
- 9 January:
  - The Department of the Treasury of the United States updated the General License 31B, maintaining the prohibition against American businesses and citizens doing business with the 2020 National Assembly. They issued a statement clarifying that the prohibition would end when the PDSVA was transferred to "a democratically-elected government that commits to taking concrete and significant efforts to combat corruption, restaur democracy, and respect human rights."
  - Active and retired teachers held large demonstrations convened by the Unitary Federation of Teachers and other union organizations to demand improvements in salaries and in the School Food Program (PAE), as well as the resignation of the minister of education, Yelitze Santaella. The protests were held in 22 states and a national strike was also called for next January 26.
  - The annual national production of the SIDOR company during the year 2022 was 280 thousand MT. of steel that does not represent even 5.6% of its capacity.
  - The U.S. updates General License 31B which allows the 2015 Assembly access to Venezuelan funds abroad. It also allows U.S. citizens to do business with Venezuela's opposition National Assembly (IV National Assembly), commissions or delegates appointed by it, but prohibits U.S. entities and citizens from doing business with the National Constituent Assembly, convened by Venezuelan President Nicolás Maduro.
  - Protests begin at SIDOR demanding salary increases and refusing to accept bonuses.
- January 10 - An investigative report by the newspaper El Nacional explaining the whitewashing of the profile of the Morón Hernández brothers to convince the US treasury to lift the sanctions they made in July 2020 for their links with Nicolás Maduro and his son Nicolasito for the illegal sale of gold and coltan.
- January 13 - Álex Ramírez is the first Venezuelan to be inducted into the Japanese Baseball Hall of Fame.
- January 15:
  - The labor protests at SIDOR ended with the agreement to address the wage claims and the non-prosecution of 70 detained workers. The government used repression with the help of the DGCIM and the Sebin, initially detaining 18 union leaders of SIDOR and Bauxilum. They were released with an order to check in every 30 days and a ban on leaving the state.
  - The second fire in three weeks is reported at the Cardón refinery.
  - A threatening video made by the motorized collective group Organization of Motorized Dependents of the Regional Executive (OMDER) circulated on social networks. However, the threats do not prevent the teachers' marches.
- January 16 - The teaching union held new demonstrations demanding salary raises, with 101 massive protests being recorded throughout the country. In Caracas, a march that had the Ministry of Education as its arrival point was blocked by Chavismo groups.
- January 17 - For the eighth time, OFAC extends Citgo's protection license until April 20.
- January 19:
  - The United States declares the reward for the capture of Nicolás Maduro for 15 million dollars is in effect. The opposition in Argentina agrees to comply with the arrest if it reaches Argentine soil.
  - The AN-2015 appoints the committee that will manage and protect property and assets abroad.
- January 21 - Miguel Rodríguez Torres, former head of government intelligence who has been detained since 2018, is released and extradited to Spain.
- January 23 - Nicolás Maduro declined to attend the meeting of the VII Celac Summit, citing security problems, but he participated by video conference, from where he demanded the cancellation of the sanctions. President Lula had a meeting in Argentina with Maduro that he had to cancel.
- January 24:
  - President of Paraguay Mario Abdo Benítez called on the presidents attending the VII Celac Summit to address the issues of the Venezuelan diaspora.
  - National Assembly approves in first discussion the bill for the Supervision and Control of Financing of NGOs. NGOs defend themselves by arguing that the government seeks to outlaw NGOs.
  - The Federal Court of Miami ruled in favor of the Venezuelan Carlos Marrón exiled in the United States who sued Nicolás Maduro, after being detained for 878 days in 2017 for managing the website dolarpro.com, which he had bought years before as a possible business later that in 2010. The publication of any dollar exchange rate except the official one was illegal.
- January 25:
  - Venezuela and Costa Rica reestablished consular relations that were withdrawn in April 2020. President Rodrigo Chaves stated: "Do not misunderstand, Costa Rica's diplomatic position with Venezuela is not changing" by stating that it is only a change in consular matters.
  - 17 Venezuelans and one Colombian were captured in the region of Tarapacá, Chile. They belong to the criminal mega-gang the Tren de Aragua. Among them was Hernán David Landaeta Garlotti, alias “Satanás” who is wanted by Venezuela where he was arrested in 2016 for double homicide and from where he escaped.
- January 26:
  - The United Nations High Commissioner for Human Rights, Volker Turk, arrives on a visit to Caracas for a round of interviews with representatives of the government and civil society.
  - The United States Department of the Treasury identified the brothers Santiago José Morón Hernández and Ricardo José Morón Hernández as front men for the son of the Venezuelan president in the trafficking of gold, coltan and other minerals.
  - Juan Guaidó presented a preliminary budget balance for the Interim Government, which recorded an expenditure budget of up to 150 million dollars. He announced that they were investing in social programs and humanitarian aid, such as the Health Heroes initiative, the Mother Mary Plan and donations to the Pan American Health Organization and the Red Cross. The expenses were authorized by the National Assembly elected in 2015. For its part, the ad hoc administrative board of the Central Bank of Venezuela details a figure that totaled $198,214,818.77.62.
- January 27:
  - The federal prosecutor's office in South Florida accuses Maikel Moreno of receiving more than $10 million in bribes in Venezuela between 2014 and 2019.
  - Professor, human rights advocate, and member of the NGO Sinergia María Fernanda Rodríguez was detained and later set free after meeting with Volker Turk.
  - Businessman Roberto Enrique Rincón Fernández, who was arrested in 2015 and found guilty in 2016 of bribery to obtain contracts with the PDVSA, is convicted and sentenced to serve 18 months in prison. The decision by Judge Gray Miller of the Southern Federal District of Texas found him guilty of violating the US Foreign Corrupt Practices Act, aiding and abetting the violation of that law, and making false statements on his federal taxes. The conspirators paid at least $1.6 million in bribes.
- January 29 - It was found that in the prison population, 60% suffer from malnutrition according to the OSH Social Humanitarian Observatory. Martha Tineo, general coordinator of the NGO "Justice, Encounter and Forgiveness", emphasized that the authorities of the penitentiary centers are above the decisions of the judges, the majority of these political prisoners have very serious mental illnesses, as a consequence of the torture which was inflicted on them. The main cause of death in the penitentiary centers is tuberculosis, which is not treated in time and is increasing among the inmates, as well as malnutrition and HIV infection.

=== February ===
- February 1 - The Monumental Stadium of Caracas is inaugurated, with a capacity for 36,500 spectators. The following day, it hosted the inaugural game of the 2023 Caribbean Series.
- February 2 - The PDVSA reactivates the operation of a drill in the Orinoco oil belt by the company Petromonagas, which is currently owned by PDVSA, after reporting that in 2022 it would have three drills operating compared to 2010 when 70 drills were operating.
- February 3 - Former deputy minister Javier Alvarado Ochoa (deputy minister between 2007 and 2013) has requested in Spain to the judge of the National Court, María Tardón, that they summon Nicolás Maduro to testify in the case in which he was being investigated for being "director member of the board of directors of the state oil company PDVSA" during 2012. Alvarado was arrested in April 2019 at the request of a U.S. investigation for receiving kickbacks from five power plant projects for overbilling.
- February 5 - The PDVSA signs a deal with Iran to renovate infrastructure from the United States to Iranian and Chinese companies. The project would be led by the National Iranian Oil Refining and Distribution Company (NIORDC) over a 100 day period.
- February 9:
  - The lawyer Jesús Manuel Silva was sentenced to 16 years and nine months in prison for domestic violence.
  - The National Assembly, after not being able to solve the issue of the teachers' salary, approved a Student Participation Law in the Basic Education Subsystem. The parent and teacher representatives rejected this proposal.
- February 11 - The four diplomatic embassy headquarters owned by the Interim Government in the United States were temporarily taken over by the US government. The Biden administration recognized the 2015 National Assembly as a legitimate legislative branch, but not as an executive branch.
- February 15 - The National Primary Commission sets October 22 as the date of the primary elections of the Unitary Platform, and also announces its electoral schedule.
- February 16 - Nicolás Maduro and Gustavo Petro sign the Partial Scope Agreement of Commercial Nature in Cúcuta, which reopens the border between both countries.
- February 27:
  - Public workers marched from Plaza Venezuela to the headquarters of the Public Ministry to demand better salaries.
  - The Defense Minister of Israel, Yoav Galant, reported gold smuggling from Venezuela to finance the terrorist activities of the Lebanese group Hezbollah in the Middle East, through Mahan Air, a privately owned Iranian airline, designated by OFAC and sanctioned in May 2022.

=== March ===
- 25 March – Twenty-one Venezuelan government officials and businessmen are arrested in an anti-corruption probe targeting state oil company PDVSA and cryptocurrency regulator Sunacrip.

=== May ===
- 22 May – 2023 Mahdia school fire: At least 20 children are killed during a fire at a school in Mahdia.

=== October ===
- 22 October – Venezuelan opposition parties hold their first presidential primary since 2012.

=== November ===
- 15 November – Venezuela announces that it will proceed with a referendum on the status of Guayana Esequiba, despite Guyana's petition to stop the referendum from being held.

=== December ===
- 3 December - A consultative referendum was held on the dispute about the territory of Guayana Esequiba.
- 4 December - Voters in Venezuela approve the takeover and integration of Guayana Esequiba in a controversial referendum. The National Electoral Council claims more than 10.5 million votes were cast with 95% being in favour of Venezuelan sovereignty over the region.
- 9 December – 2023 Guyana–Venezuela crisis: The United Nations Security Council holds a closed-door meeting on the ongoing crisis between Venezuela and Guyana over the Essequibo region, but takes no immediate action.
- 12 December – 2023 Guyana–Venezuela crisis: A meeting is to be held in Saint Vincent and the Grenadines on Thursday to discuss the ongoing dispute between Venezuela and Guyana. Both countries will try to prevent the crisis escalating into an armed conflict.
- 14 December – Venezuelan President Nicolás Maduro and Guyanese President Irfaan Ali hold talks in Kingstown, Saint Vincent and the Grenadines. Both leaders agree to neither use threats nor force against the other. A joint commission is announced to address the existing issues, with a report expected within three months.
- 20 December – Venezuela releases ten Americans, including Leonard Glenn Francis, and the United States releases Alex Saab, an ally of Venezuelan president Nicolás Maduro, in a prisoner exchange between the two countries. As part of the deal, Venezuela will also release around 20 political prisoners from jail.

== Deaths ==
- 6 January – Victoria de Stefano, 82, Italian-Venezuelan writer

== See also ==
- Hyperinflation in Venezuela
- 2023 in politics and government
- 2020s
- 2020s in political history
