= Isnotú, Trujillo, Venezuela =

- Location within Venezuela
- Coordinates: 9°21′57″N 70°42′09″W

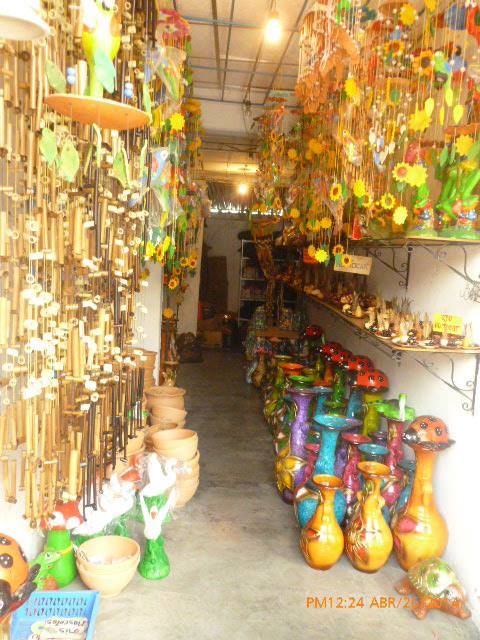
Artesanos Isnotú Valera

Isnotú (Spanish pronunciation: [iznoˈtu]) is a tiny town located in Trujillo, Venezuela, roughly 269 miles (433 km) west of Caracas. It has an average daytime temperature of 25 °C (77 °F).

Isnotú was founded by Bishop Mariano Martí on April 13, 1777. Its name came from the Indigenous tribe that inhabited the area at the time of its founding, the Isnotúes.

Isnotú is the birthplace of Doctor José Gregorio Hernández. Daily, thousands of people come there to visit the Santuario (the Sanctuary) which was built as a sign of gratitude for miraculous healings attributed to Dr. Hernández.
