= Teresa Selma =

Venezuelan actress (1930–2024)

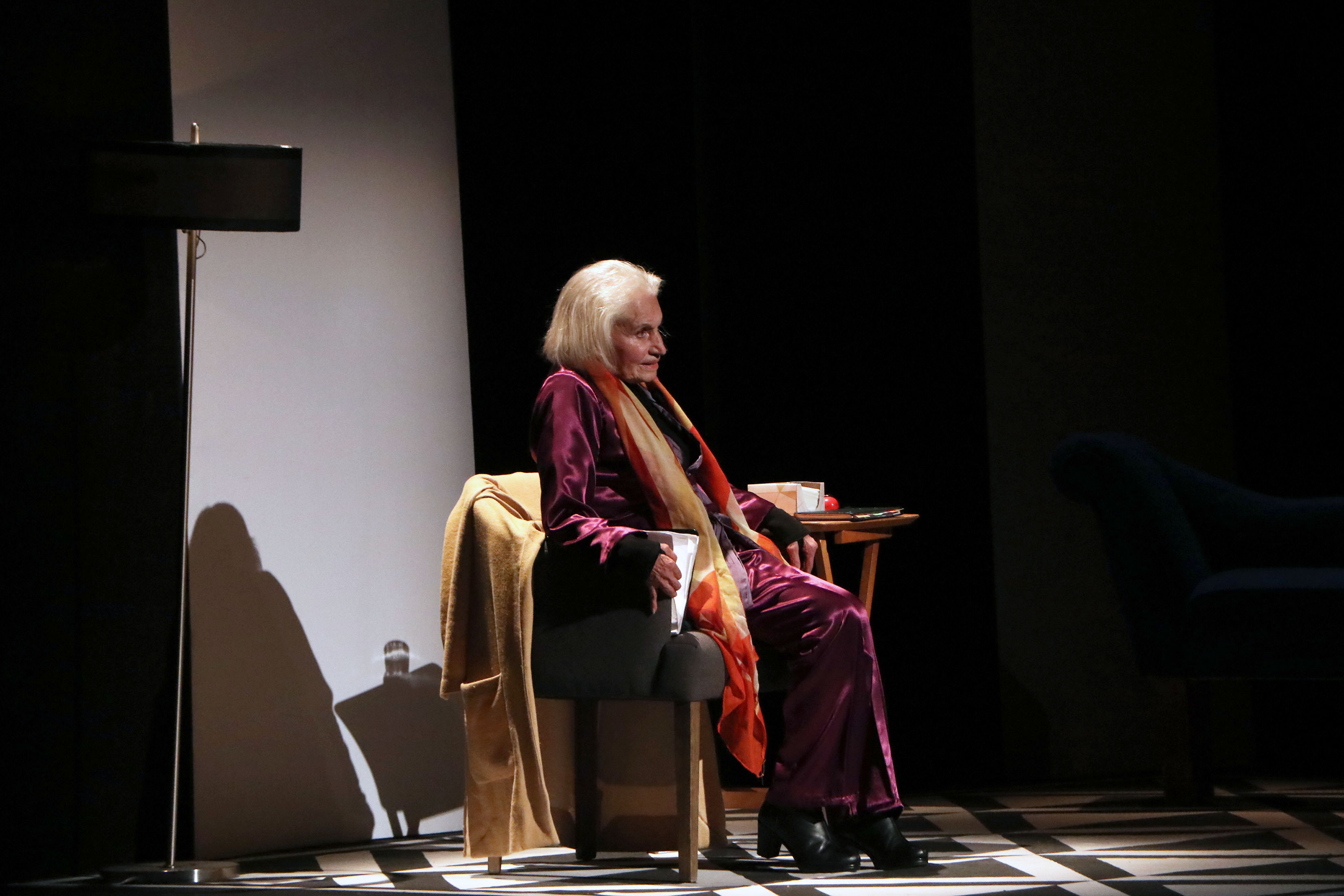
- Selma in 2022
- Born: Teresa Ramos Monte; August 13, 1930; Puerto Píritu, Venezuela
- Died: February 20, 2024 (aged 93); Mexico City, Mexico
- Occupation: Actress
- Years active: 1957–2024

Teresa Ramos Selma Monte (August 13, 1930 – February 20, 2024) was a Venezuelan actress. She played roles in film, theater, television and dubbing.

== Life and career ==
Teresa Ramos Selma Monte was born in Puerto Píritu, Venezuela on August 13, 1930.

Selma's work included performances in theatrical productions such as: El último verano de Sarah Bernhardt (2011), Arráncame la vida (2013) and Yo soy Carlos Marx (2014).

== Death ==
Teresa Selma died on February 20, 2024, at the age of 93.

== Recognition ==
In 2015, Selma was honoured for having a career spanning 65 years at the World Season of Performing Arts Quetzalcoatl by Isabel Quintanar, president of the Mexican Center of the International Theatre Institute (ITI).

== Filmography ==
=== Films ===
Year	Title	Role	Notes
1965	Llanto por Juan Indio		Supporting Role
1970	Remolino de pasiones		Supporting Role
1976	La India	Waitress	
