= Bulla Loca mine disaster =

2024 Venezuelan mine disaster

- Angostura Municipality, Bolívar, in Venezuela
- Date: 20 February 2024
- Location: La Paragua, Bolíivar state, Venezuela
- Cause: unknown
- Deaths: 15 (Note: Some sources estimate more than 20 deaths)
- Injuries: At least 11 injured

The Bulla Loca mine disaster occurred on 20 February 2024, when an illegal gold mine called Bulla Loca, located in La Paragua, in the Angostura Municipality Bolíivar in Venezuela collapsed leaving at least a dozen people dead, although the exact number of people killed varies among authorities.

== Background ==
The Venezuelan economy faces a series of coyuntural problems that is affecting the local population, which has motivated its inhabitants to find ways to support themselves at home, in which they have chosen to explore mines illegally which contravenes Venezuelan laws and for which they have created numerous environmental problems.

== Accident ==
The time of the accident occurred when the event took place on Tuesday, 20 February at 3:00 p.m. (Venezuela local time) in Bolívar. During the following hours, the rescue of multiple victims was carried out. The number of people affected has not been confirmed and only an approximate number is available. The Secretary of Citizen Security in Bolívar, Edgar Colina Reyes, provided the first report in the early hours of 21 February. The Operational Zone for Damage Assessment and Needs Analysis (Zoedan) of Bolívar described that the Bulla Loca mine it is an open-pit “artisanal mine” where “some miners are found injured and walled up.”

== See also ==
- Deforestation of the Amazon rainforest
- Environmental issues in Venezuela
- Orinoco Mining Arc
- Mining in Venezuela
- 2024 in Venezuela
