= El Callao, Venezuela =

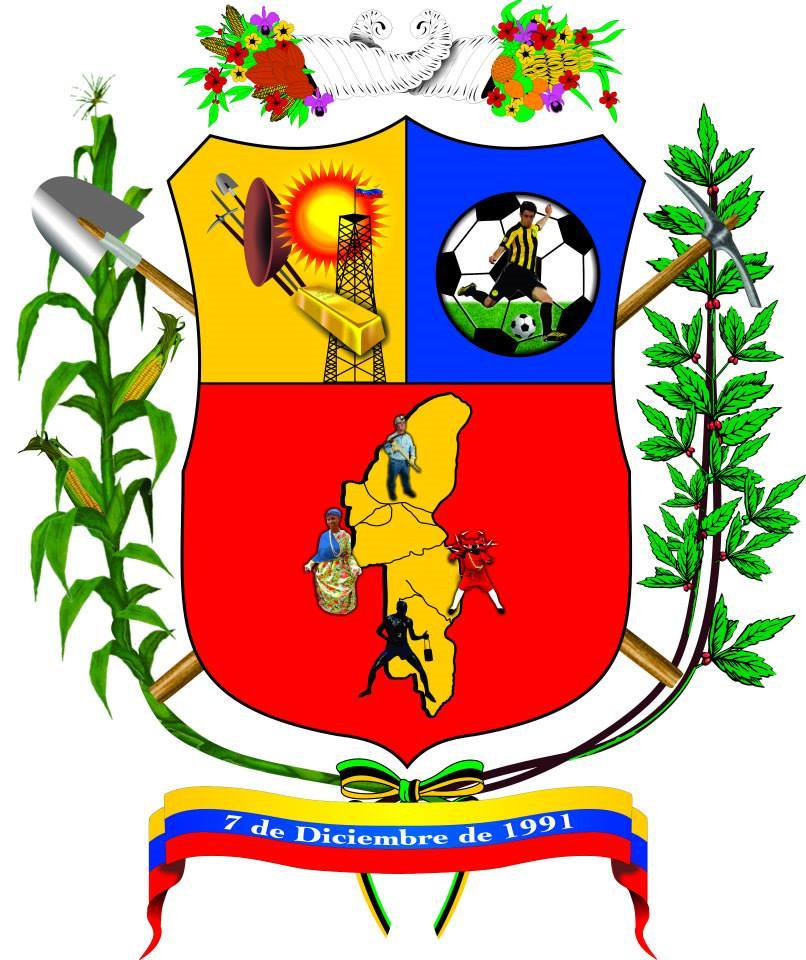
- Coat of arms

- Location within Venezuela
- Coordinates: 7.3463°N 61.8271°W
- Time zone: UTC−4 (VET)

El Callao is the capital city of the El Callao Municipality in the state of Bolívar, Venezuela. It was founded in the mid-19th century. The goldmine at El Callao, once one of the richest goldmines in the world, came into operation in 1871.

Due to gold mines in the area, the real number of inhabitants may be five times higher than the official total of around 25,000.

== Carnival of El Callao ==
Calypso de El Callao, a carnival held in El Callao, was included in UNESCO's Representative List of the Intangible Cultural Heritage of Humanity in 2016.

== See also ==
- List of cities and towns in Venezuela
