= SS Esso Maracaibo =

1959 Venezuelan crude oil tanker

History

Venezuela
- Name: Esso Maracaibo (1959–1976); Lagoven Maracaibo (1976–1985)
- Owner: Creole Petroleum Corp (1959–1976); Lagoven S.A. (1976–1985)
- Route: Maracaibo-San Nicolaas
- Builder: Hitachi Zosen, Innoshima
- Cost: $ 7,000,000
- Yard number: 3824
- Launched: 23 February 1959
- Completed: July 1959
- Commissioned: July 1959
- Maiden voyage: 26 July 1959–18 August 1959
- Renamed: Lagoven Maracaibo (1976)
- Refit: 1964, repairs, and new section added
- Stricken: 20 June 1985
- Homeport: (Venezuela) Maracaibo
- Identification: IMO number: 5107891
- Fate: Scrapped June 1985, at National Ship Demolition, Kaohsiung
- Notes: Rammed General Rafael Urdaneta Bridge, 6 April 1964

General characteristics
- Class & type: Esso Maracaibo class
- Type: Tanker
- Tonnage: 24,727 GRT (1959–1964); 24,088 GRT (1964–1985); 35,601 DWT (1959–1964); 40,925 DWT (1964–1985)
- Length: 198.1 m (649 ft 11 in) (1959–1964); 212.2 m (696 ft 2 in) (1964–1985)
- Beam: 27.7 m (90 ft 11 in)
- Draft: 11 m (36 ft)
- Installed power: Steam turbine, 12,500 hp (9,300 kW)
- Propulsion: Single screw
- Speed: 15 knots (28 km/h)
- Crew: 50 (1959); 42 (1964)
- Sensors & processing systems: Radar, sonar

Esso Maracaibo was a tanker of the Creole Petroleum Corporation (a subsidiary of Standard Oil Corporation of New Jersey). She was the second ship of that enterprise to bear that name, the first one having been USS Narraguagas. Its purpose was to transport crude oil between Lake Maracaibo and Aruba. It made international headlines on 6 April 1964, when it rammed the General Rafael Urdaneta Bridge, causing two spans of it to collapse.

== Construction ==
Esso Maracaibo was one of four tankers built in 1959 for the Creole Petroleum Corporation at shipyards in Japan. Like her sister Esso Caracas (yard no. 3825), she was built at the Hitachi Zosen shipyard in Innoshima where she was launched on 23 February 1959. Two other ships of the same class, Esso Amuay and Esso Caripito, were built by Mitsui Shipbuilding & Engineering. At 24,727 GRT, with 30 tanks, built along classic lines with bulbous bow, bridge and officer's quarters located amidships, and engines, crew quarters and aft deckhouse located toward the stern, those oil tankers were typical in both size and design for their time. They were equipped with modern navigational devices, radar and sonar, and air conditioning for the crew quarters. While at $7,000,000 each, those ships were a substantial investment, they made up for that by being able to transport about three times as much crude oil per voyage as the biggest lake tanker of the company so far.

== Service ==
Following outfitting, Esso Maracaibo entered service in July 1959, to run the route between the ports of Maracaibo and San Nicolaas. She arrived at Maracaibo on 18 August 1959 after a maiden voyage of 24 days, and then delivered 205,800 barrels (32,720 m^{3}) of crude to the Lago refinery at Aruba on 21 August 1959. This was less than her maximum capacity of 296,000 barrels (47,100 m^{3}), because the outer bar of the Lake Maracaibo channel only had a depth of 33.5 feet (10.2 m), before being dredged, while Esso Maracaibo had a summer draft of 36 feet (11 m), fully loaded. In later years, the four big tankers of the Creole Petroleum Corporation moved 160,600,000 barrels (25,530,000 m^{3}) of crude and other oil products to refineries on Aruba in a year.

== Collision with the General Rafael Urdaneta Bridge ==
On 6 April 1964 Esso Maracaibo, carrying 236,000 barrels (37,500 m^{3}) of crude oil, was on her way through the outlet of Lake Maracaibo when she lost her steering because of an electrical malfunction. Unable to navigate, the ship first hit pier 31 of the General Rafael Urdaneta Bridge and then also crushed pier 32. This led to the collapse of a 259-metre (849 ft 9 in) long section of the bridge. Four cars fell to the sea, resulting in seven deaths. (Note: The New York Times reported five casualties.) Parts of the bridge came down on the bow of the tanker, short of the superstructure, and oil leaked out, but the ship stayed afloat. Nobody of the 42 crew members was injured.

== Repairs and further service ==
During repairs, an additional section was added to Esso Maracaibo, bringing her length to 212.2 metres (696 ft 2 in) (203 m (666 ft) at the waterline) and increasing capacity to 40,925 DWT (Fairplay magazine reported in 1985 27,695 GRT and 41,582 DWT). She continued to transport crude for the Creole Petroleum Corporation, with a break in 1973, when she was in drydock and Greek tanker Dorias (94,000 DWT, 846 feet (258 m)) substituted for her. In 1976, after Venezuela had nationalized the Venezuelan branch of the company, she was renamed Lagoven Maracaibo, but otherwise kept her service routine. In 1985, she was decommissioned, together with Dorias towed to Taiwan, and scrapped there.
