= Coro Revolution =

Revolution in Venezuela

- Part of the Venezuelan civil wars
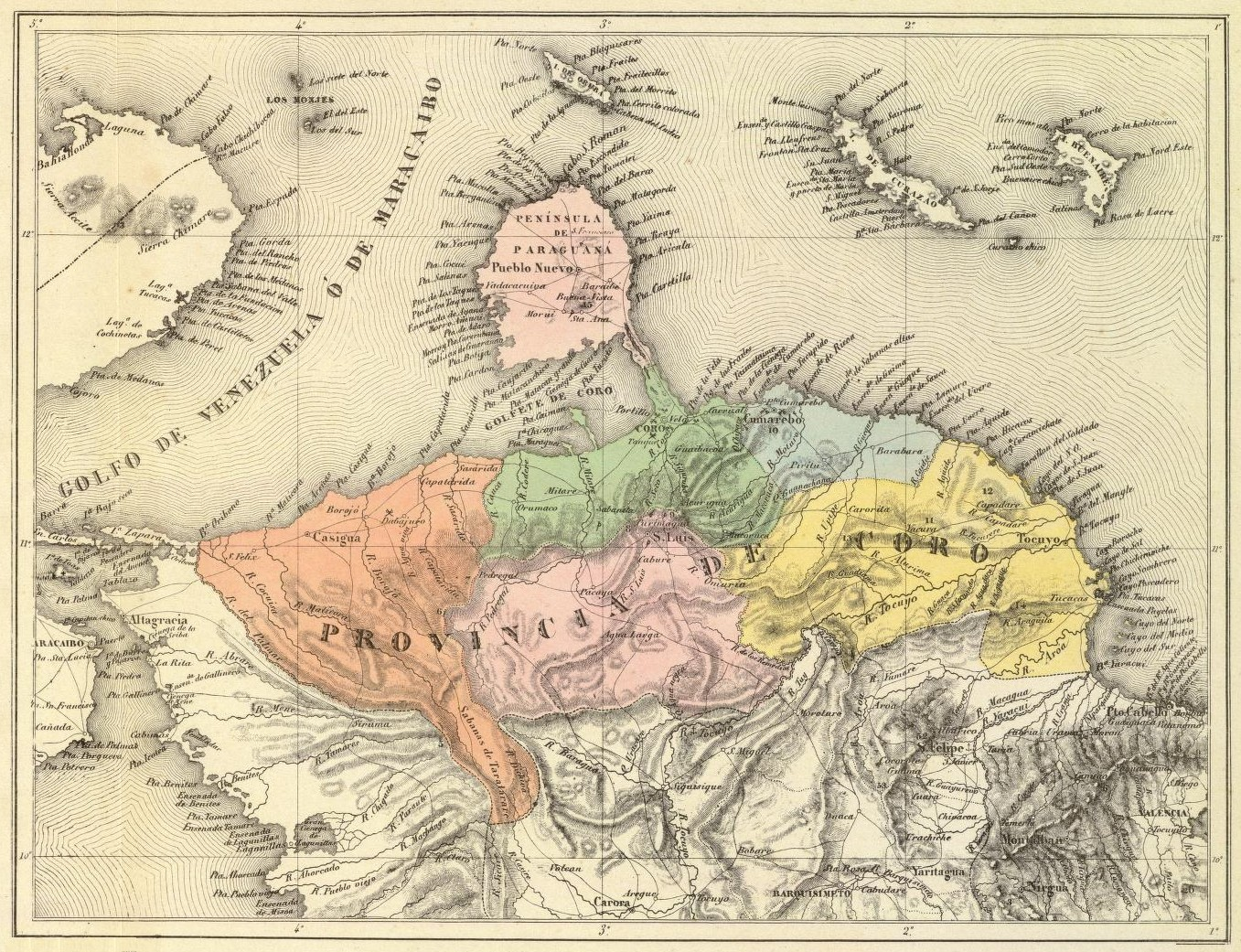
- Coro Province
Date	October 1874 – 3 February 1875
Location	Venezuela
Result	Rebellion suppressed

Commanders
Antonio Guzmán Blanco	León Colina José Ignacio Pulido Briceño

Strength
22,000 soldiers	4,000 soldiers

The Coro Revolution, also known as the Colinada Revolution, was an armed insurrection led by General León Colina that occurred in Venezuela between October 1874 and February 1875 against the government of Antonio Guzmán Blanco. The conflict was one of the main armed movements against the dictatorship of Antonio Guzmán Blanco.

The revolution was led by several liberal political leaders, among them generals León Colina and José Ignacio Pulido. The revolution also had the support of the Conservative Party who were defeated during the Federal War. Before the rebellion was suppressed, it came to occupy parts of the Province of Barquisimeto. The most pivotal event of the rebellion was the Battle of Barquisimeto.

== Background ==
León Colina had been a member of the government of Guzmán Blanco and participated in the War Council against the Matías Salazar rebellion in 1872. However, in 1873 Colina distanced himself from Guzmancism and started a movement against him.

== Development ==
In October 1874, the Falcón State Legislative Assembly declared war on Antonio Guzmán Blanco, accusing him of being a tyrant.

With the intention of spreading the rebellion throughout the country, León Colina established contact with General José Ignacio Pulido, who until then had been a political ally of Guzmancism. When Guzmán Blanco found out about the rebellion, he commented: "The Revolution has an Army in the West without a general and in the East a general without an Army."

On 20 October 1874 the insurrection broke out. On 27 November 1874, Colina, commanding an army of 3,000 men, attacked the federalist defenders of Barquisimeto, who were commanded by General Rafael Marquez Arana, beginning the Battle of Barquisimeto. The battle lasted three days, leaving a large number of dead and ending in a victory for the forces of the government. The rebels were forced to retreat to Coro with just 1,200 men. In Coro, they were forced to fight an uprising in favor of the government.

== Outcome ==
León Colina agreed to surrender on 3 February 1875. The victory reinforced the power of President Antonio Guzmán Blanco.

== See also ==
- History of Venezuela
- April Revolution (Venezuela)
