= Carmen Elena Rendiles Martínez =

Venezuelan Religious Sister, foundress and saint of the Catholic Church

Saint Maria Carmen Rendiles Martínez SJC
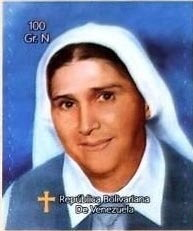

Virgin
- Born: Carmen Elena Rendiles Martínez; 11 August 1903; Caracas, Venezuela
- Died: 9 May 1977 (aged 73); Caracas
- Venerated in: Roman Catholic Church
- Beatified: 16 June 2018, Universidad Central de Venezuela, Caracas, Venezuela by Cardinal Angelo Amato
- Canonized: 19 October 2025, Saint Peter's Square, Vatican City by Pope Leo XIV
- Feast: 9 May

Carmen Elena Rendiles Martínez, SJC (11 August 1903 – 9 May 1977) María Carmen in religion and also known as Maria del Monte Carmelo Rendiles, was a Venezuelan Catholic religious sister who founded the congregation of the Servants of Jesus of Caracas. Rendiles first served in leadership for the Servants of the Eucharist in France, where she completed her novitiate, before returning to Venezuela to found her congregation in 1965. She was its first superior general. On October 19, 2025, she was canonized. In January 2026 Pope Leo XIV sought her intercession following the US raid on Venezuela.

== Life ==
Carmen Elena Rendiles Martínez was born on 11 August 1903 in Caracas as third of seven children to Ramiro Antonio Rendiles and Ana Antonia Martínez. Rendiles was born without a left arm and so was given a prosthetic arm which she had attached to her for her entire life. Her baptism was celebrated in the church of Santa Anna on 24 September 1903 and she received her Confirmation on 28 October 1905; she made her First Communion on 11 March 1911.

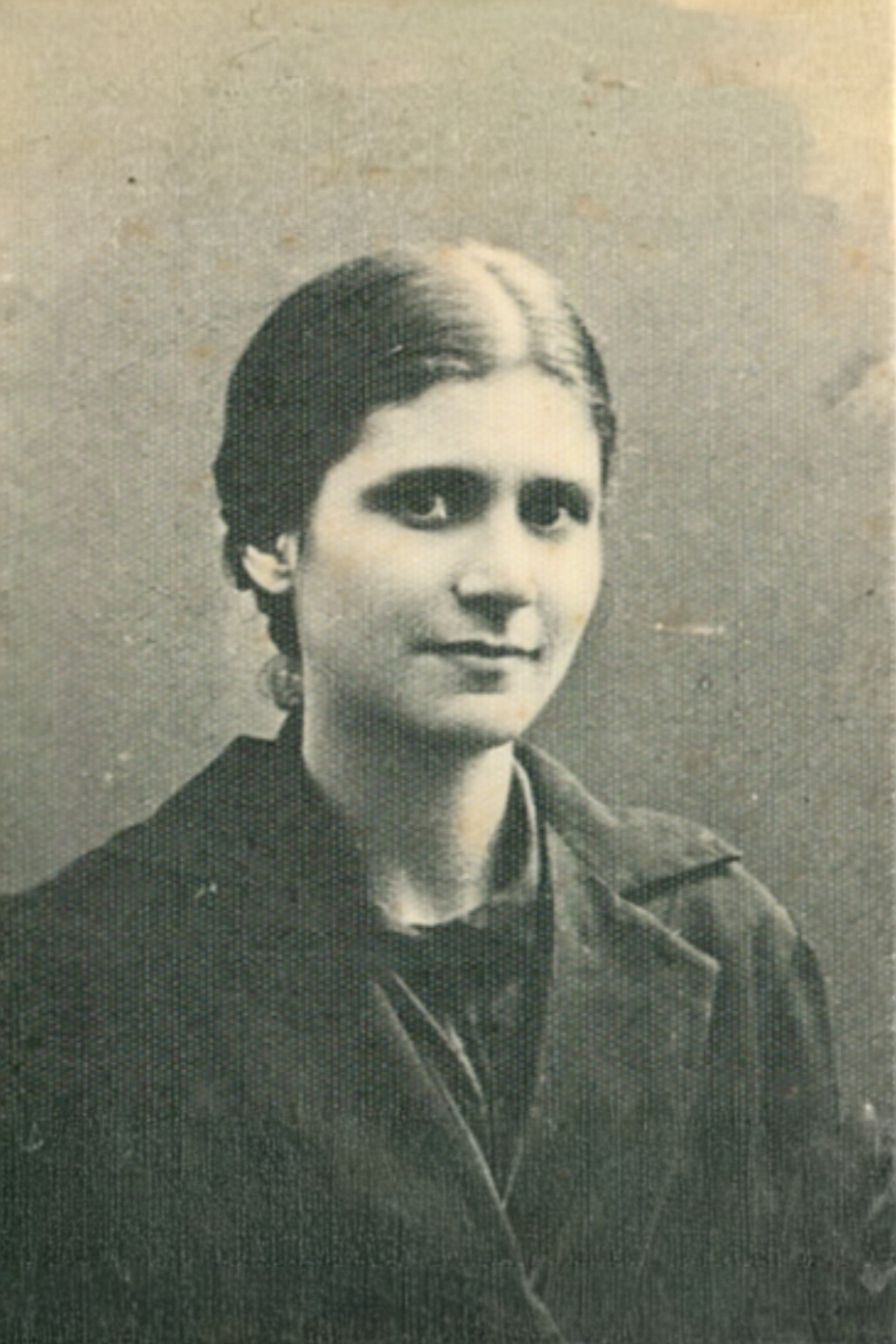
Rendiles in the mid-1920s

In 1918, Carmen felt her concrete call to the religious life. Her father died in the mid-1920s. In December 1926, religious from France arrived and Carmen took their arrival as a sign that she was to follow her vocation as part of their congregation so applied and received permission for admission. Rendiles joined the Servants of the Eucharist on 25 February 1927 and was sent for her novitiate to Toulouse, where she received the religious habit on 8 September 1927. Rendiles made her first vows on 8 September 1929 and made her perpetual vows on 8 September 1932. In 1945, she was made the superior for all the congregation's houses in Venezuela.

Rendiles founded the Servants of Jesus on 25 March 1965; the congregation received diocesan approval and support on 14 August 1969 from the Cardinal Archbishop of Caracas José Humberto Quintero Parra. She was the Superior General of the congregation she founded from 1969 when she was appointed until her death.

Rendiles died in mid-1977 in Caracas, due to influenza. In 2015 there were 94 religious in a total of 19 communities in both Venezuela and in Colombia.

== Beatification process ==
Rendiles was titled as a Servant of God in 1994 under Pope John Paul II and later named as Venerable under Pope Francis in 2013 upon the confirmation of her heroic virtue. Francis later confirmed a miracle attributed to her in late 2017; her beatification was celebrated in Caracas on 16 June 2018.

On 31 March 2025, Pope Francis announced the canonization of Rendiles. Upon canonization, Rendiles will be the first female saint from Venezuela. On 13 June, the date of her canonization was set for 19 October 2025. On 13 June 2025, in the first ordinary public consistory of Pope Leo XIV, it was decreed that Rendiles would be canonized on 19 October 2025. She was canonized along with José Gregorio Hernández, making them the first saints from Venezuela.
