= José Gregorio Hernández =

Venezuelan physician and Franciscan tertiary declared a saint by the Catholic Church

Saint José Gregorio Hernández Cisneros OFS
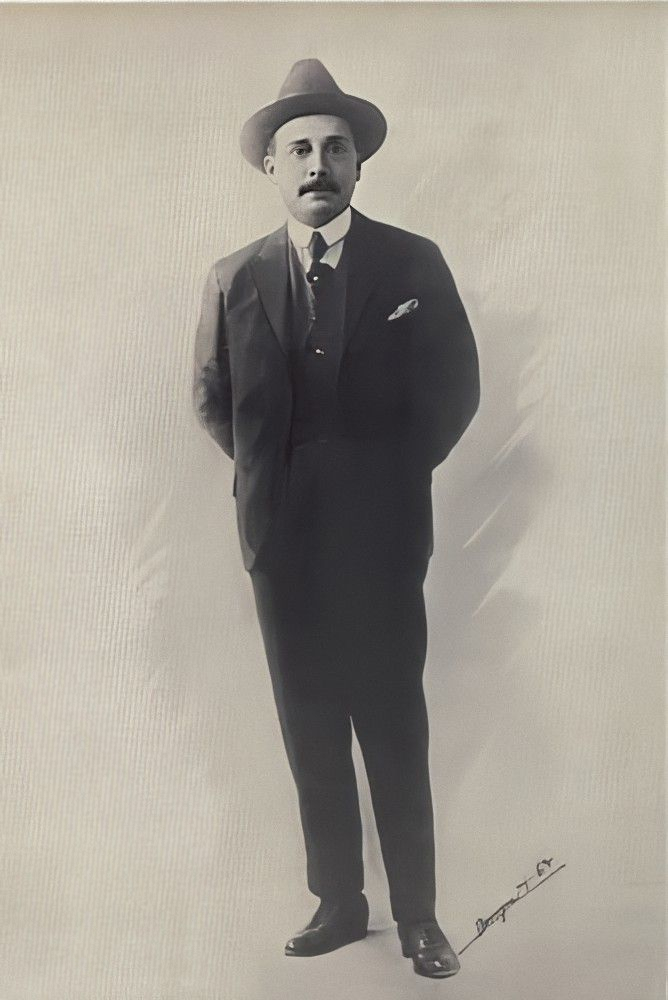
- Born: 26 October 1864; Isnotú, Trujillo, Venezuela
- Died: 29 June 1919 (aged 54); Caracas, Venezuela
- Venerated in: Catholic Church (Venezuela)
- Beatified: 30 April 2021, Colegio La Salle La Colina, Caracas, Venezuela, by Archbishop Aldo Giordano
- Canonized: 19 October 2025, Saint Peter's Square, Vatican City, by Pope Leo XIV
- Feast: 26 October
- Attributes: Doctor's coat
- Patronage: Medical students; Diagnosticians; Doctors; Medical patients

José Gregorio Hernández Cisneros (Spanish: [xoˈse ɣɾeˈɣoɾjo eɾˈnandes]; 26 October 1864 – 29 June 1919) was a Venezuelan physician and active member of the Third Order of Saint Francis. Born in Isnotú, Trujillo State, he became a highly renowned doctor, more so after his death. Known for his many acts of charity for the poor of his society and his dedicated life of faith, he was beatified in 2021 by Pope Francis, who later approved his canonization in early 2025. He was canonized by Pope Leo XIV on 19 October 2025, one of the first two citizens of that nation to be so recognized by the Catholic Church.

== Early life and education ==
José Gregorio Hernández Cisneros was born on 26 October 1864 in Isnotú, a small village in the State of Trujillo in Venezuela. He was one of the six children of Benigno María Hernández y Manzaneda and Josefa Antonia Cisneros y Mansilla. His mother was descended from a notable family of Spain, being related to the famed 15th-century Cardinal Cisneros, a major figure in Spanish history.

Hernandez spent the entirety of his childhood in his hometown, where his mother worked as a housekeeper and his father sold pharmaceuticals and livestock. Hernández was baptized on 30 January 1865 in what is now the parish Church of Niño Jesús de Escuque. He received the sacrament of Confirmation on 6 December 1867 from the Bishop of Mérida, Juan Hilario Bosset Castillo.

At the age of thirteen, José Gregorio told his parents of his desire to go to law school and become a lawyer, but was persuaded by his mother to pursue a career in medicine instead. In 1878, he set off on the long and difficult journey from the Andes Mountain Range in Trujillo to Caracas. He enrolled in Colegio Villegas, one of the country's most prestigious schools at the time, where, in 1882, he graduated with a baccalaureate in philosophy.

After completing his high school education, Hernández enrolled in the Central University of Venezuela in Caracas to begin his medical studies. Throughout his six years at the university, he was described by his professors as a student of outstanding academic performance and conduct.

== Career ==
In 1888, Hernández graduated as a medical doctor from the Central University of Venezuela. The Venezuelan government awarded him a grant to continue his studies in Europe. Hernández traveled to Paris, where he studied other fields of medicine such as bacteriology, pathology, microbiology, histology, and physiology. Following his return to Venezuela, he became a leading doctor at the Hospital José María Vargas. Between 1891 and 1916, he dedicated himself to teaching, to medicine, and to religious practice.

During this period, however, Hernandez made two attempts to begin studies for the priesthood, but his fragile physical condition ultimately stood in his way: In July 1908, he entered the Charterhouse of Farneta near Lucca, Italy, to explore his vocation as a Carthusian, leaving the following April. In 1913, in a further attempt, Hernandez enrolled as a seminarian at the Pontifical Latin American College in Rome, but again, health problems obliged him to return to Venezuela. There he turned to the life of a Franciscan tertiary to fulfill his religious calling.

During his practice of medicine, Hernández treated the poor for free and even bought them medicines with his own money. Among his scientific publications are The Elements of Bacteriology (1906), About the Angina Pectoris of Malaric Origin (1909), and The Elements of Philosophy (1912).

With the arrival in 1918 of the highly contagious Spanish flu in Venezuela, Hernández treated patients in Caracas who had caught it. Hernández died in 1919, after being struck by a motorist.

His major relics are venerated in the La Candelaria Catholic Church in Caracas.

== Veneration ==
=== Beatification ===
After his death, Hernández's fame began to spread. Claims were made around the country that miracles had been experienced in cases where his intercession before God had been invoked. Eventually, his name became known all over Latin America and Spain. His healing help is often invoked by both doctors and patients. He is also called upon for protection during overland journeys.

In 1949, Venezuelan Catholic Church officials began the process of determining whether or not Hernández was eligible for beatification. In 1985, the Holy See granted him the title of a Venerable. In August 2014, the Catholic Bishops Conference of Venezuela called on all Catholics to attend Mass and thank God "for the life and example of this great Venezuelan, with great hope and implore the grace of his speedy beatification" on the occasion of the 150th anniversary of Hernández' birth, Sunday, 26 October 2014.

In June 2020, Pope Francis decided in favor of the beatification of José Gregorio Hernández, after the recovery of a girl who had been shot in the head, which was recognized as a miracle attributed to his intercession. The solemn proclamation was made at a Mass celebrated on 30 April 2021 in the church of the Collegio La Salle of Caracas by the apostolic nuncio, Archbishop Aldo Giordano.

=== Canonization ===
On 25 February 2025, Pope Francis announced that Hernández would be canonized. On 13 June 2025, in the first ordinary public consistory of Pope Leo XIV, it was decreed that Hernández would be canonized on 19 October 2025, along with six other blesseds. He was canonized on 19 October 2025 by Pope Leo XIV in a multitudinous event at the St. Peter's Square in Vatican City, Rome, becoming the first Venezuelan saint. He was canonized along with Carmen Elena Rendiles Martínez, making them the first saints of Venezuela.

=== Cultic veneration ===
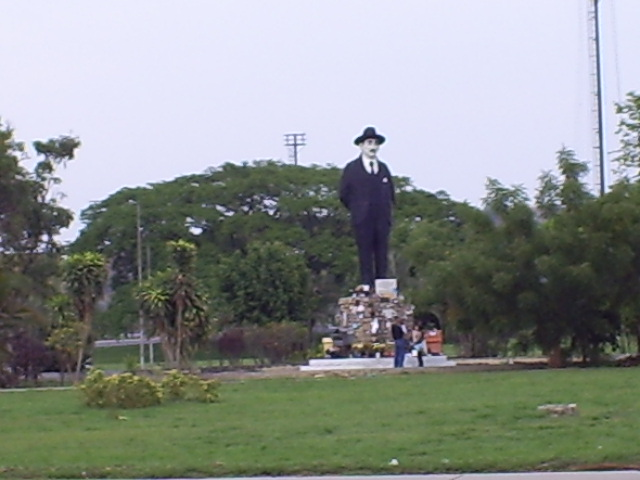
A statue of Dr. José Gregorio Hernández in Guacara, Venezuela

Hernández is also revered by Venezuela's alternative and syncretic religion, the cult of María Lionza. Historian Steven Palmer also has drawn parallels between the Hernández cult and that of the assassinated Costa Rican physician and politician Ricardo Moreno Cañas.

== Legacy ==
A private university in Maracaibo, Universidad Dr. José Gregorio Hernández, founded in 2003, is named for him. In 2011, Hernández's birthday, 26 October, was declared a "day of national celebration". Hernández is also an important folk figure and is commonly portrayed in naïve art.

== Publications ==
- 1893 – Sobre el número de glóbulos rojos. Gaceta Médica de Caracas
- 1894 – Sobre angina de pecho de naturaleza paludosa. Gaceta Médica de Caracas
- 1910 – Lecciones de bacteriología. Gaceta Médica de Caracas
- 1910 – Lesiones anatomo–patológicas de la pulmonía simple o crupal. Gaceta Médica de Caracas
- 1910 – De la nefritis a la fiebre amarilla. Gaceta Médica de Caracas
- 1913 – Renuncia ante la Academia Nacional de Medicina. Gaceta Médica de Caracas
- 1918 – Nota preliminar acerca del tratamiento de la tuberculosis por el aceite de Chaulmoogra. Gaceta Médica de Caracas
- 1922 – Elementos de bacteriología. 2.ª edición: Caracas. El Cojo
- 1959 – Elementos de filosofía. 3.ª edición: Caracas. Bibliográfica Venezolana
- 1968 – Obras completas. Caracas. Universidad Central de Venezuela
