= El Callao Municipality =

El Callao Municipality Municipio El Callao
- Municipality
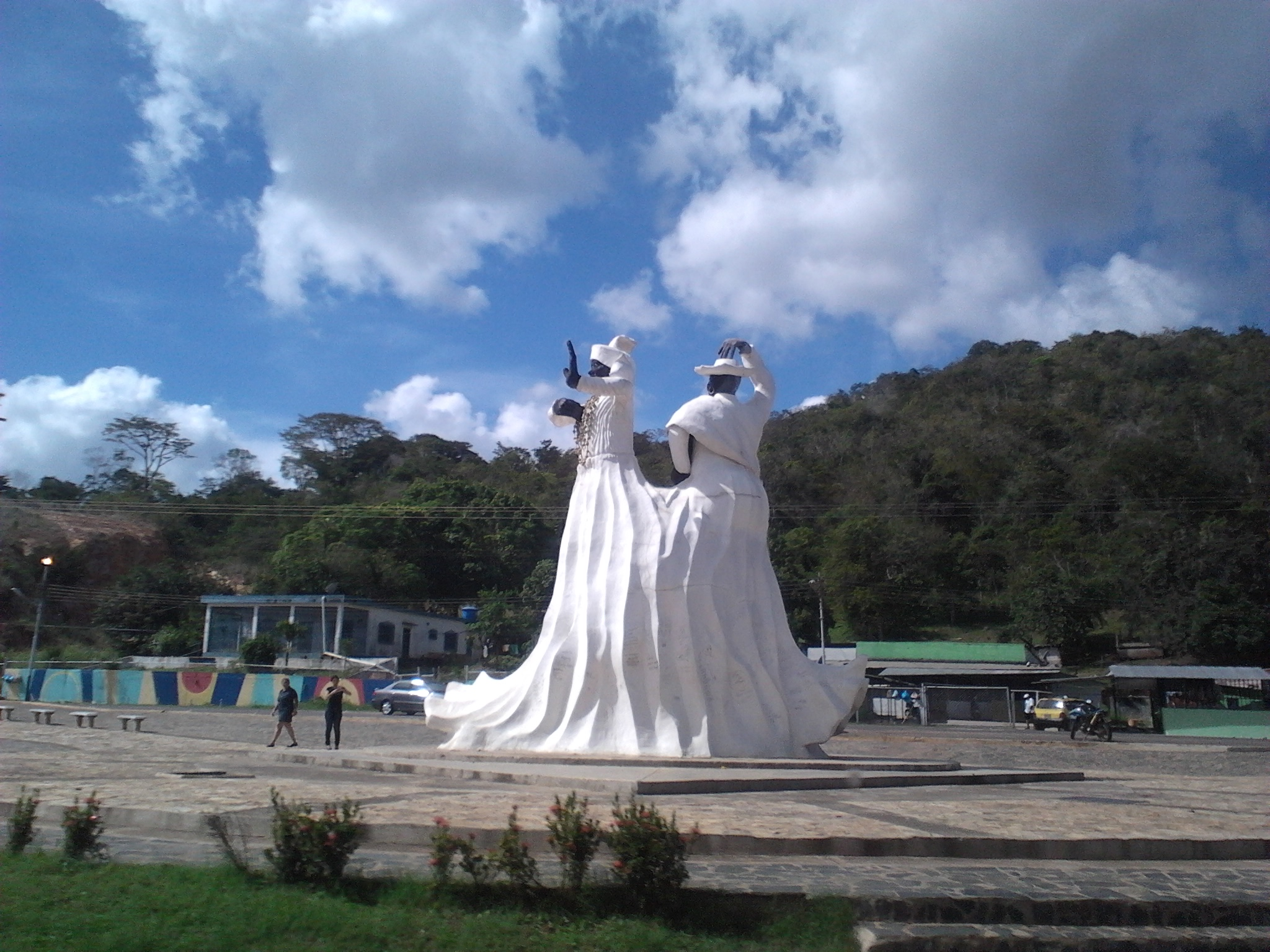

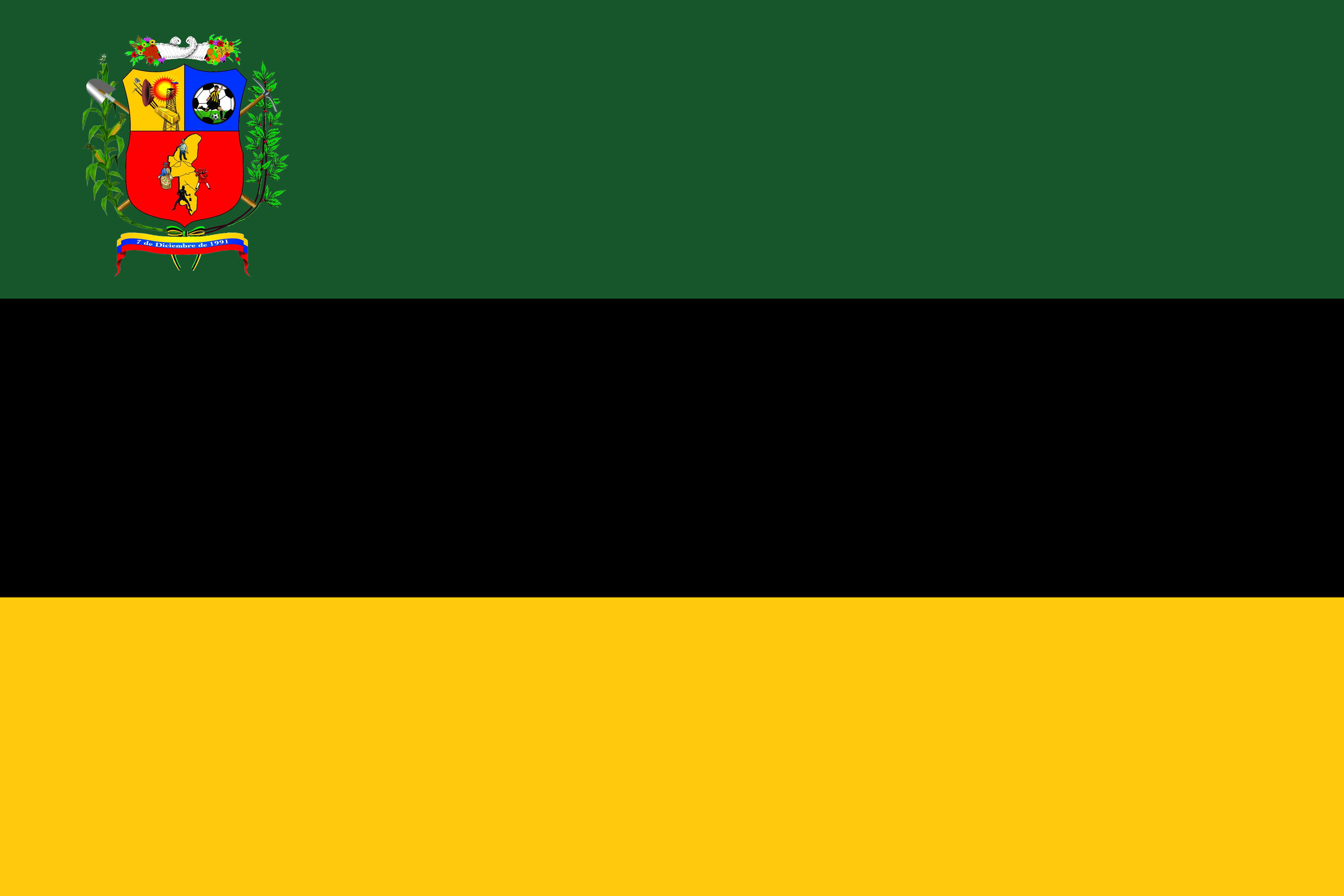
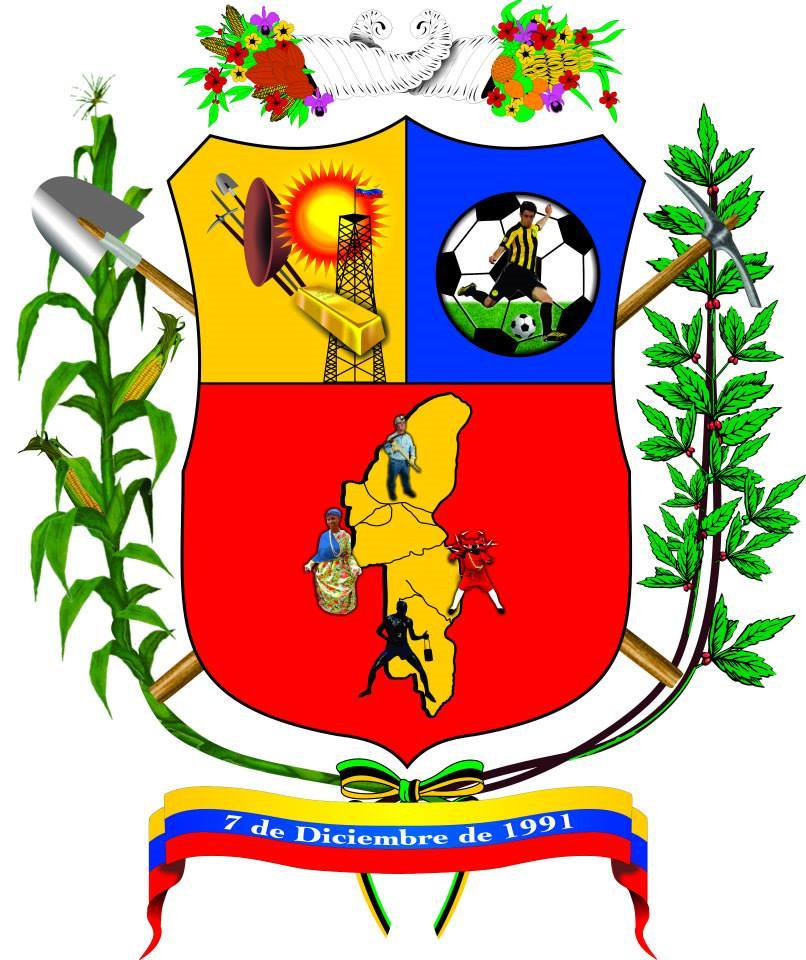
- Flag Coat of arms

- Location in Bolívar

- Location in Venezuela
- Coordinates: 7°10′35″N 61°52′25″W
- Country: Venezuela
- State: Bolívar
- Municipal seat: El Callao

Government
  - Mayor: Jesús Coromoto Lugo (PJ/MUD)

Area
  - Total: 3,810.0 km^{2} (1,471.0 sq mi)

Population (2011)
  - Total: 21,769
  - Density: 5.7136/km^{2} (14.798/sq mi)
- Time zone: UTC– 04:00 (VET)
- Area code(s): 0288
- Website: Official website

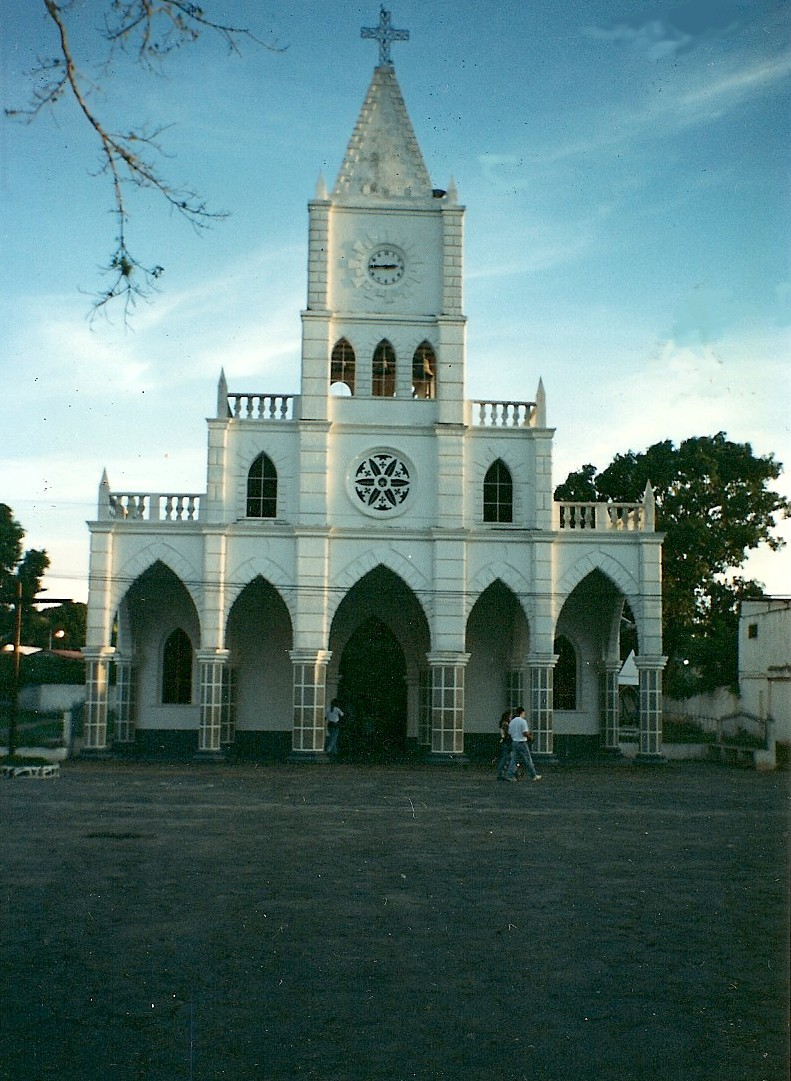
El Callao church

The El Callao Municipality is one of the 11 municipalities (municipios) that makes up the Venezuelan state of Bolívar and, according to the 2011 census by the National Institute of Statistics of Venezuela, the municipality has a population of 21,769. The town of El Callao is the shire town of the El Callao Municipality.

== History ==
The town of El Callao, between the 18th and 19th centuries, before the arrival of the Spanish and the colony, was inhabited by the indigenous Maquiritare. Then some explorers settled in this territory looking for escaped slaves. These African slaves were in the vicinity of the Yuruari River and used this hiding place, if they were found they were returned to their work. But many of them stayed there because it was a perfect place to build a town, they killed and enslaved indigenous people from the area, and founded the town of El Callao. Over time, events would come that would make El Callao a population with several languages derived from the speech of African slaves in this region, mixed with that used by the English and French in their invasions of Spanish territories, and a few Creoles who speak Spanish, in an almost entirely Spanish-speaking country.Large gold deposits were found in Yuruari, which made El Callao develop rapidly and led to the penetration of English and Brazilian miners. Recently the national government signed several treaties with various countries around the world to exploit it.

In 1854, the first miners settled in the area of El Callao, dedicated to the exploitation of gold-bearing quartz in the area of Ejidos de la Nueva Providencia de Caratal, on the banks of the Yuruari River. These miners were mostly immigrants from the Caribbean Antilles: San Marteen, Santa Lucía, San Cristóbal, Trinidad among others, generating a varied cultural conglomerate, both idiomatic and gastronomic, making this area of Guayana particularly rich and special culturally. because in this area English, Papiamento and other languages were spoken.

The municipality becomes official or is created on December 7, 1991. Along with the creation of the municipality came the coat of arms and the flag. The municipality clearly demonstrates its passion for football, by dedicating a barracks to it (specifically the right one), in its honor, and they also dedicate spaces to its main economy, gold, it is the left barracks, and in the lower one see the entire municipality.

=== Hydrography ===
The municipal hydrography is recognized mainly by the Yuruari River, by the veins of pure gold in its interior.

=== Geology ===
The El Callao region within the hydrographic basin of the Yuruari River dates from the Precambrian, mainly from the Archean and the Cenozoic. The volcanic rocks metamorphosed into the green schist facies, received the name of El Callao formation because they were found in this locality. In the District there are between 250 and 300 veins of gold. In the early 1970s, 88 veins were being exploited, of which 68 were in national mining concessions and 20 in private mining concessions.

In some cases the veins reach lengths of 4 kilometers. The gold appears irregularly distributed and generally tends to decrease with increasing depth. The gold mineralization is made up of native gold and in solid solution, associated with pyrite and small amounts of chalcopyrite, bornite, sphalerite and tetrahedrite. In addition, tungsten minerals, essentially scheelite, have been found in certain areas. Gold-bearing quartz veins are invariably associated with shear zones and the development of a very pronounced schistosity. The most favorable box rocks are metabasalts and metaandesites (green rocks and propylites); Gold is found mainly in the form of native gold in quartz veins and in silicified and carbonate zones and in the form of tellurides and pyrite or arsenopyrite content.

== Weather ==
The climate of the municipality is on average between 25 and 30 Cº and in the municipality there is some frequent rain, which drives agriculture and other jobs.

== Demographics ==
The El Callao Municipality, according to a 2007 population estimate by the National Institute of Statistics of Venezuela, has a population of 24,013 (up from 18,530 in 2000). This amounts to 1.6% of the state's population. The municipality's population density is 10.8 inhabitants per square kilometre (28/sq mi).

== Government ==
The mayor of the El Callao Municipality is Jesús Coromoto Lugo Larreal, re-elected on October 31, 2004, with 43% of the vote. The municipality is divided into one parish; Capital El Callao.

== Gold mines ==
The gold mine at El Callao, started in 1871, was for a time one of the richest in the world, and the goldfields as a whole saw over a million ounces exported between 1860 and 1883. The gold mining was dominated by immigrants from the British Isles and the British West Indies, giving an appearance of almost creating an English colony on Venezuelan territory.

== Calypso culture ==
The Trinidadian immigrants brought the music of Calypso with them, which later became very popular in the city. The folk music is a mixture of Venezuelan and Caribbean genres and is sung in Spanish and/or Caribbean English. It is closely associated with the Carnival festival, a tradition also brought by the West Indian people.

In the carnival months, Calypso is performed with competitions, where the winners are crowned Calypso King and Queen. Calypso or as the town's people call it "Calipso" is one of the most popular cultural tradition that the city is well known for in the rest of the country. Popular instruments used in the performance of the music are the drums, cuatro, maracas, guitar, bandolin, violin and the steel drum.

== See also ==
- El Callao
- Bolívar
- Municipalities of Venezuela
