= List of earthquakes in Venezuela =

Map of earthquakes in Venezuela since 1900, with magnitudes. Click for dates and details. (map data)

This is a list of earthquakes with epicentres in Venezuela or significant impacts in the country. Overall, the population in this region resides in structures that are vulnerable to earthquake shaking, though resistant structures exist. The predominant vulnerable building types are unreinforced brick masonry and adobe block construction.

== Earthquakes ==
Date	Location	Mag.	MMI	Deaths	Injuries	Note	Ref
24 June 2026	Yaracuy; La Guaira	7.2/7.5 M_{w}	IX	6,509	226,696	Doublet earthquake, extreme damage	
24 September 2025	Zulia	6.2/6.3 M_{w}	VIII	1	110	Severe damage	
24 November 2018	Trujillo	5.2 M_{w}	VI		2	Minor damage	
21 August 2018	Sucre	7.3 M_{w}	VII	5	122	Moderate damage	
15 January 2010	Carúpano	5.6 M_{w}	VII		11	Minor damage	
27 November 2009	Lara	5.4 M_{w}	VII			Minor damage	
12 September 2009	Carabobo	6.3 M_{w}	V		18	Minor damage	
9 July 1997	Sucre	6.9 M_{w}	VIII	81	683	Severe damage	
12 June 1974	Lara	6.1 M_{w}	VIII	5	1	Some damage	
30 July 1967	Caracas	6.6 M_{w}	VIII	300	1,536	Severe damage	
17 January 1929	Cumaná	6.9 M_{s}	IX	200+		Severe damage / tsunami	
29 October 1900	Miranda	7.6 M_{s}		101	50+	Severe damage / tsunami	
28 April 1894	Mérida	7.0 M_{w}	VIII	350		Significant damage	
18 May 1875	Cúcuta	7.5 M_{w}	IX	10,000		Extreme damage	
15 July 1853	Sucre	7.5 M_{s}	IX	600–4,000		Tsunami 15 m (49 ft)	
26 March 1812	Caracas, Vargas	7.7 M_{w}	X	15,000–20,000		Extreme damage	
21 October 1766	Cumaná	6.5–7.5 M_{s}	IX–X			Severe damage	
11 June 1641	Caracas	6.5		200		Severe damage	
Note: M_{w} = moment magnitude scale, M_{s} = surface-wave magnitude. Only damaging, injurious, or deadly events should be recorded.

== See also ==
- Geology of Venezuela
- Lists of earthquakes
