= 2025 Zulia earthquakes =

Series of earthquakes in Venezuela

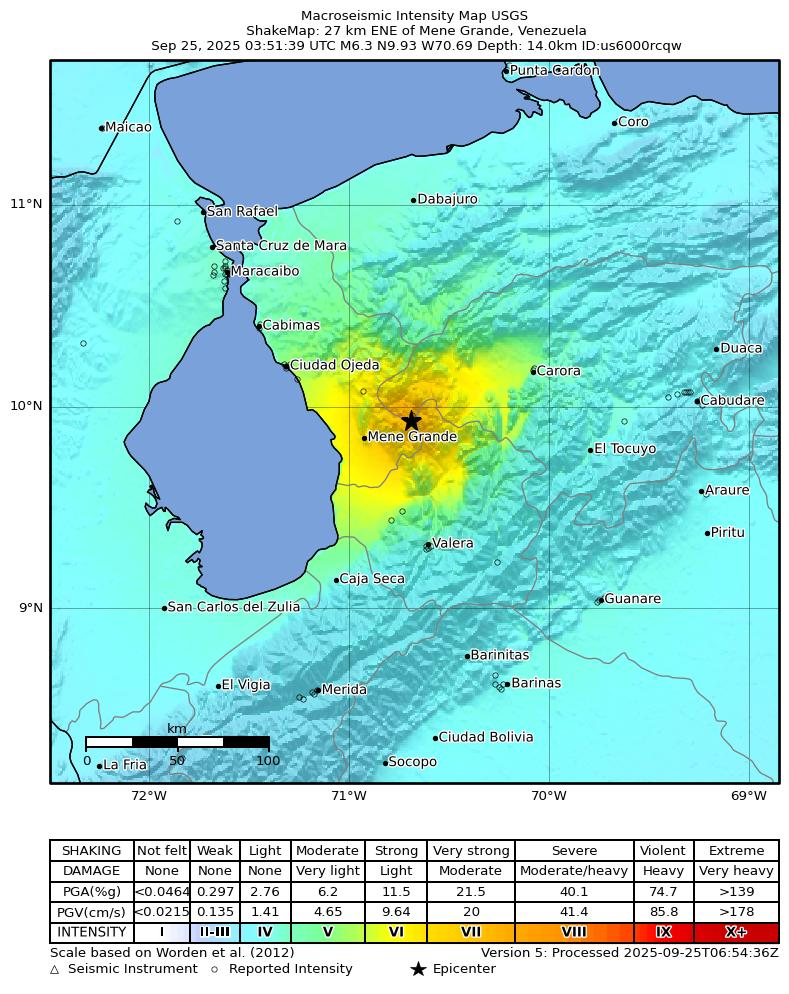
- USGS Shakemap

- Location within Venezuela
- UTC time: 2025-09-24 22:21:55; 2025-09-25 03:51:39
- ISC event: 644206985; 644207002
- USGS-ANSS: ComCat; ComCat
- Local date: September 24, 2025; September 24, 2025
- Local time: 18:21 VET; 23:51 VET
- Duration: 30 seconds
- Magnitude: M_{w} 6.2; M_{w} 6.3
- Depth: 7.8 km (4.8 mi); 14.0 km (8.7 mi)
- Epicenter: 9.927°N 70.692°W
- Areas affected: Western Venezuela; Norte de Santander, Colombia
- Max. intensity: MMI VIII (Severe)
- Aftershocks: 20+
- Casualties: 1 death, 110 injuries

On September 24, 2025, a series of earthquakes struck Zulia state, Venezuela. The largest were magnitude 6.2 M_{w} and 6.3 M_{w}, located 24 and 27 km ENE of Mene Grande, at depths of 7.8 and 14 km, respectively. The earthquakes caused at least one death and 110 injuries. Several homes were destroyed.

== Tectonic setting ==
Mene Grande is located in a region where the Caribbean plate and South American plate interact. The Caribbean Plate is being pushed eastward and partially collides with the South American Plate. The interaction of the plates creates an oblique collision zone. The relative plate movement has led to the formation of a wide zone of complex faulting. The Zulia earthquakes occurred within a triangle formed by three strike-slip fault systems: the Boconó Fault to the south, the Oca-Ancón Fault to the north, and the Bucaramanga-Santa Marta Fault to the west. The Boconó Fault has caused significant seismic movements in the past, such as in 1610 and 1894.

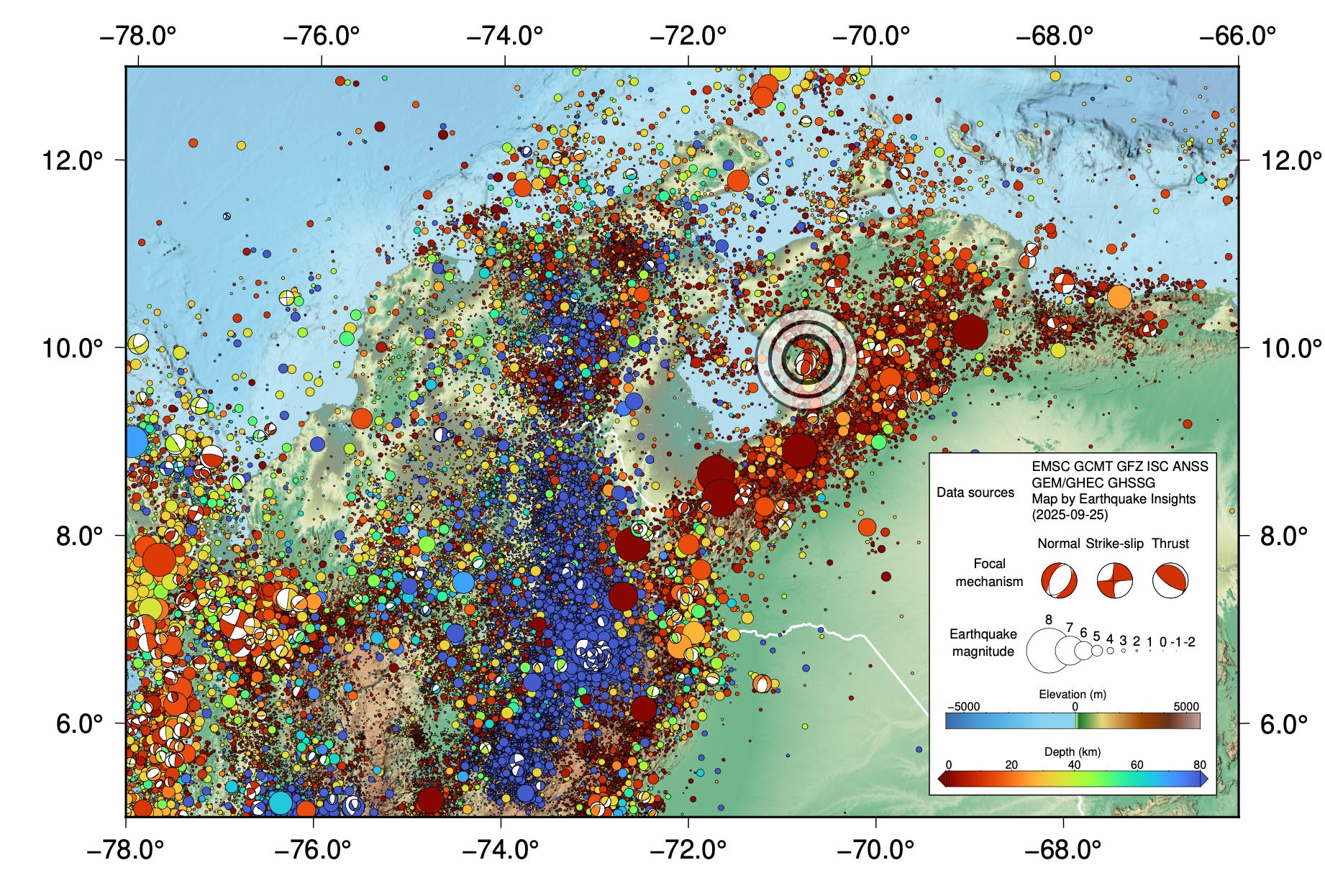
Map of earthquakes in Colombia and Venezuela, colored by depth. Bull's-eye highlights the 2025 Zulia earthquake sequence

The Zulia earthquakes did not occur on any of the three major strike-slip fault systems. Instead, they occurred inside the deforming triangle and were located close to two mapped faults: the Mene Grande Fault (a thrust) and the Valera Fault (a strike-slip fault) but likely occurred on a separate, unmapped fault.

== Earthquakes ==
Moment of the first earthquake in Zulia, Venezuela, recorded by a store security camera

Both earthquakes had an intensity of VIII according to the USGS. In Mene Grande, the intensity ranged from VII (very strong) to VI (strong), in Valera and Ciudad Ojeda, the intensity was VI (strong), while in Maracaibo it was between V (moderate), in Oranjestad, Aruba, the intensity was IV (light), as well as in Willemstad, Curaçao and the Venezuelan city of Barquisimeto. In Caracas, the earthquake was perceived with an intensity of III (weak). The earthquake was felt on the island of Bonaire and in the Colombian cities of Cúcuta, Bucaramanga, Maicao, Valledupar, Riohacha, Santa Marta and Barranquilla, where high-rise buildings and offices were evacuated. The earthquakes were felt as far away as Medellin, more than 660 kilometers away.

Approximately 31 minutes before the first major earthquake, a foreshock with a magnitude of 3.9 M_{w} occurred in the same area. The Venezuelan Foundation of Seismological Research (Funvisis) estimated the first earthquake as a 5.4, while the second was placed at 6.0. International organizations marked the first event as a 6.2, while the second as a 6.3.

== Damage and casualties ==
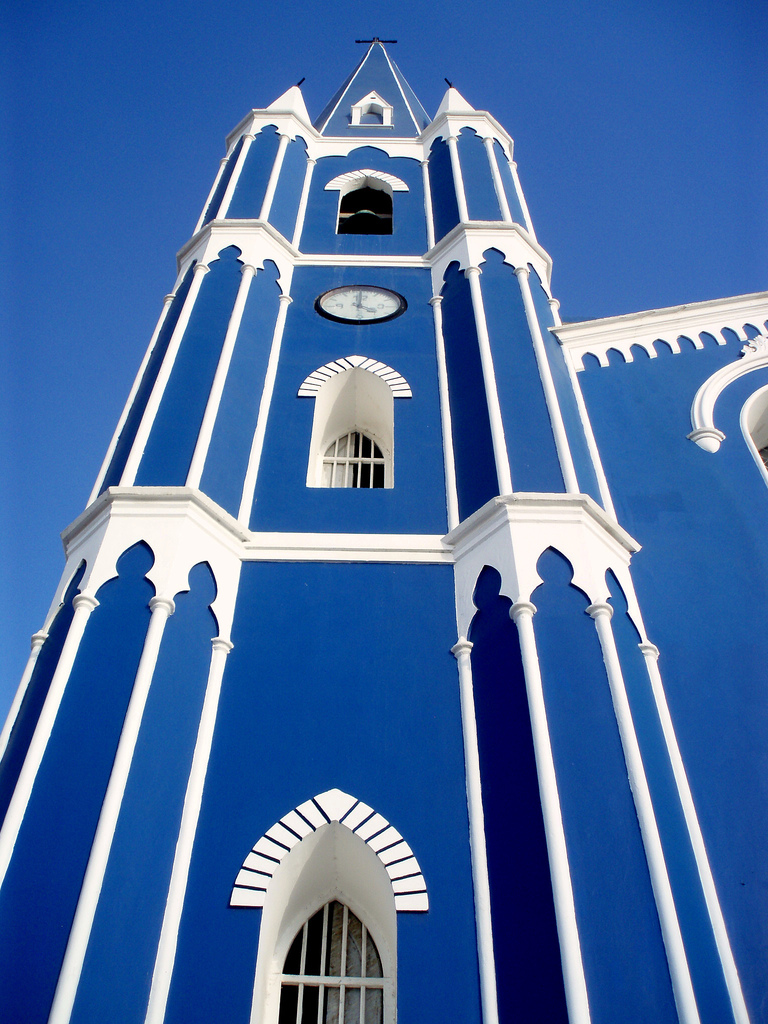
View of the dome of the Church of Santa Bárbara in Maracaibo, which was severely damaged by the earthquake that occurred some time later

A 70-year old man died of a heart attack in Lara State, at least 110 people were hospitalized for panic attacks or injuries, more than 44 homes collapsed and several others were damaged.

The state hardest hit by this earthquake was Zulia, where objects fell from supermarket shelves, large ground fissures were seen, homes were damaged or destroyed, power outages and traffic lights were knocked out in Mene Grande and Pampán. Part of the San José High School in Lagunillas was reportedly destroyed, as was a family home in the same town. At least 16 homes collapsed in the state. In the Mara Municipality, several stilt houses collapsed and 107 people were hospitalized.

Material damage was reported to businesses, the Southern General Hospital, and the Santa Bárbara Church in Maracaibo, several people fainted at the Galerías Mall, radio mast towers were tilted and traffic lights were damaged in the same city. The St. Peter and St. Paul Cathedral and the Convent of San Francisco de Asís were also affected by the earthquake. Power and electricity outages were reported in Jesús Enrique Lossada Municipality. The Modin Building was affected and cracks could be seen in its columns. Some structural cracks appeared in the states of Miranda, Trujillo, and Barinas. The Luis Razett Hospital in Pueblo Nuevo suffered structural damage. A bridge in Baralt Municipality was affected by cracks that required an exhaustive review to determine the stability of the structures. In the same municipality, about 50 homes were damaged or destroyed and the drinking water infrastructure and several roads were affected. In Caracas, some windows and doors collapsed.

In Lara state, 28 homes destroyed and more than 32 were damaged. According to the governor of Lara, Luis Reyes Reyes, 65% of the homes in the Montaña Verde parish, in Torres municipality, were left uninhabitable and three people were injured by falling debris. In the Matajey hamlet in the same municipality, at least 57 houses were affected, 25 were destroyed. In Colombia, two houses were reported damaged in Ocaña, Norte de Santander.

== Response ==
Initially, Venezuelan Interior Minister Diosdado Cabello stated that no damage had been reported following the first earthquake. However, many alternative news outlets had previously shared images and videos of damaged structures on social media. Minutes later, Luis Gerardo Caldera, governor of Zulia, stated via social media that authorities were conducting damage assessments in the area. President Nicolás Maduro called for a national drill to address armed conflicts and natural disasters on September 27. The mayor of Bucaramanga, Colombia, carried out damage control in his area. Vice president Delcy Rodríguez declared the country to be on high alert. The University of Zulia in Maracaibo, Venezuela suspended classes for 24 hours the earthquakes.

== See also ==
- List of earthquakes in 2025
- List of earthquakes in Venezuela
