= Candelaria of Saint Joseph =

Venezuelan religious sister

Blessed Candelaria of Saint Joseph O.Carm
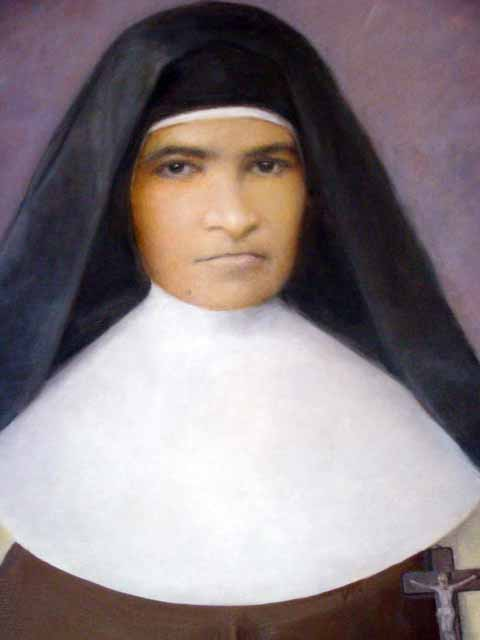

Virgin
- Born: 11 August 1863; Altagracia de Orituco, Guárico, Venezuela
- Died: 31 January 1940 (aged 76); Cumaná, Sucre, Venezuela
- Venerated in: Roman Catholic Church
- Beatified: 27 April 2008, Universidad Central de Venezuela, Caracas, Venezuela by Cardinal José Saraiva Martins
- Feast: 1 February

Candelaria of Saint Joseph, O.Carm (born Susana Paz-Castillo Ramírez; 11 August 1863 – 31 January 1940) was a Venezuelan Catholic religious sister who founded the Carmelite Sisters of Venezuela, also known as the "Carmelites of Mother Candelaria".

The death of her parents in 1870 and 1887 prompted her to assume household responsibilities though in 1900 set her heart on aiding others in her area; this started in 1903 when she served as the director of a new hospital, though she also tended to ill people during epidemics and conflicts that broke out over time. It was in the context of this service that she founded her religious order.

Her beatification was celebrated on 27 April 2008 and was the first to be celebrated on her home soil. Cardinal José Saraiva Martins presided over the celebration on the behalf of Pope Benedict XVI.

== Life ==
Susana Paz-Castillo Ramírez was born on 11 August 1863 in Guárico in Venezuela to Francisco de Paula Paz-Castillo and María del Rosario Ramírez. Her father died on 23 November 1870 when she was seven and her mother died on 24 December 1887; it was upon her mother's death that she assumed the responsibilities of the household. Her baptism was celebrated on 27 February 1864 in the local parish church of Nosta Senora de Altagracia and the priest Juan Pablo presided. Her maternal grandmother was the cousin of Simon Bolívar. Ramírez made her First Communion in 1879 after having received her Confirmation on 13 June 1870.

Her father earned the esteem of his neighbors; he knew natural medicine which he used to help those who asked for his help. Her mother was pious and hardworking. Both her parents offered their children the best education that the circumstances of their lives allowed. The girl was instilled with religious values – like her siblings — and in due time learned how to read and write as well as to embroider. The death of her mother saw her tend to her cousins and siblings.

The Liberation Revolution saw her tend to those who were wounded and she was charitable to those invalids who gathered at a house attached to the parochial church. In 1903 when the San Antonio hospital was founded she became its director at the encouragement of the parish priest Sixto Soda Diaz. When a nurse would tell her that there was no bread or medicine to distribute she went out with a small basket to find what was needed. On 13 September 1906 – with the authorization of the local bishop – she took a religious habit and the new religious name Candelaria of Saint Joseph.

On 31 December 1910 she founded the Sisters of the Poor of Altagracia de Orituco with the profession of the first six members at the hands of Felipe Neri Sendrea who confirmed her as the Superior general of the congregation. In 1916 she began an eighteen-month financial campaign to assist the congregation's works. On 31 December 1916 she made her perpetual vows.

The Superior general traveled far in search of resources for the support of her works founding new communities that responded to the needs of the times depending on the location; she founded two hospitals with one on the Isla de Margarita at Porlamar called the Hospice for the Abandoned and the other at Upata. But difficulties confronted the congregation in its earliest of stages.

On 12 July 1922 the Carmelites of the Ancient Observance arrived in Porlamar on the Island of Margarita and so Bishop Sixto Sosa Díaz gave them the parish of Saint Nicholas of Bari to operate in. But Candelaria of Saint Joseph never suspected the great gift that this new congregation's presence would be to her and to the difficult and dangerous work the congregation was involved in. It was soon aggregated to the Carmelites on 25 March 1925 after Candelaria made a formal petition for it be aggregated the previous 1 January and she later ceased as Superior general at the congregation's first General Chapter on 11 April 1937. She kissed her successor's scapular as a sign of obedience. The formal reception of the Carmelite habit was on 10 July 1926. The remainder of Candelaria's life was marked with a painful disease but post-1937 she continued serving the congregation as the mistress of novices. In 1929 an earthquake saw her tend to the people while a smallpox epidemic saw her tend to the victims in the hospital.

In June 1938 Candelaria fell ill with a serious condition and her health started to deteriorate at a rapid pace after this stage. In the dawn of 31 January 1940 she vomited blood and proceeded to pronounce the name of Jesus Christ three times before she died.

== Beatification ==
The beatification process started on 19 June 1980 after the Congregation for the Causes of Saints issued the official "nihil obstat" (nothing against) to the cause and titled her as a Servant of God. The cognitional process opened in Caracas on 27 November 1983 and received validation on 15 January 1988 before the postulation compiled and sent the positio to the Congregation for the Causes of Saints in 1996. The confirmation of Candelaria of Saint Joseph's heroic virtue on 19 April 2004 allowed for Pope John Paul II to title her as venerable.

A miracle was investigated in a diocesan tribunal and received validation on 25 February 2000. Pope Benedict XVI voiced his approval to this on 6 July 2007. Cardinal José Saraiva Martins presided over the beatification on 27 April 2008 in Venezuela – the first on Venezuelan soil – with 40 000 in the main stadium where the celebration was held and another 20 000 in another one not too far off with television screens broadcasting the event. Cardinal Jorge Urosa and the nuncio Giacinto Berlocco were in attendance. The postulator for this cause is Giovanna Brizi.
