= 1812 Caracas earthquake =

Magnitude 7.7 earthquake in Venezuela

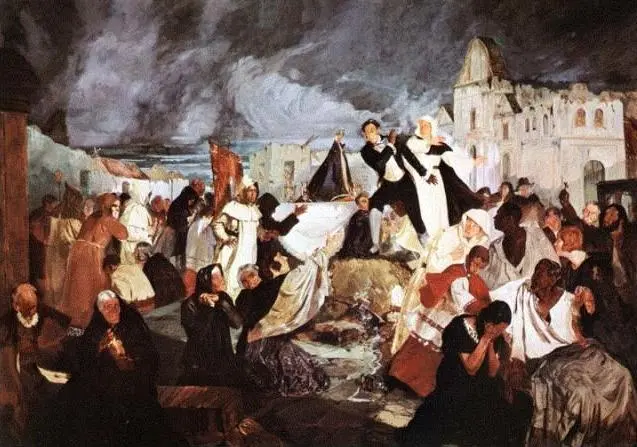
- "Terremoto de 1812", painting by Tito Salas

- Location within Venezuela
- Local date: March 26, 1812
- Local time: 16:37
- Magnitude: M 7.7 M_{w} 7.4 and M_{w} 7.1
- Depth: 33 km (21 mi)
- Epicenter: 10.6°N 66.9°W
- Max. intensity: MMI IX (Violent)
- Casualties: 2000–10.000 fatalities

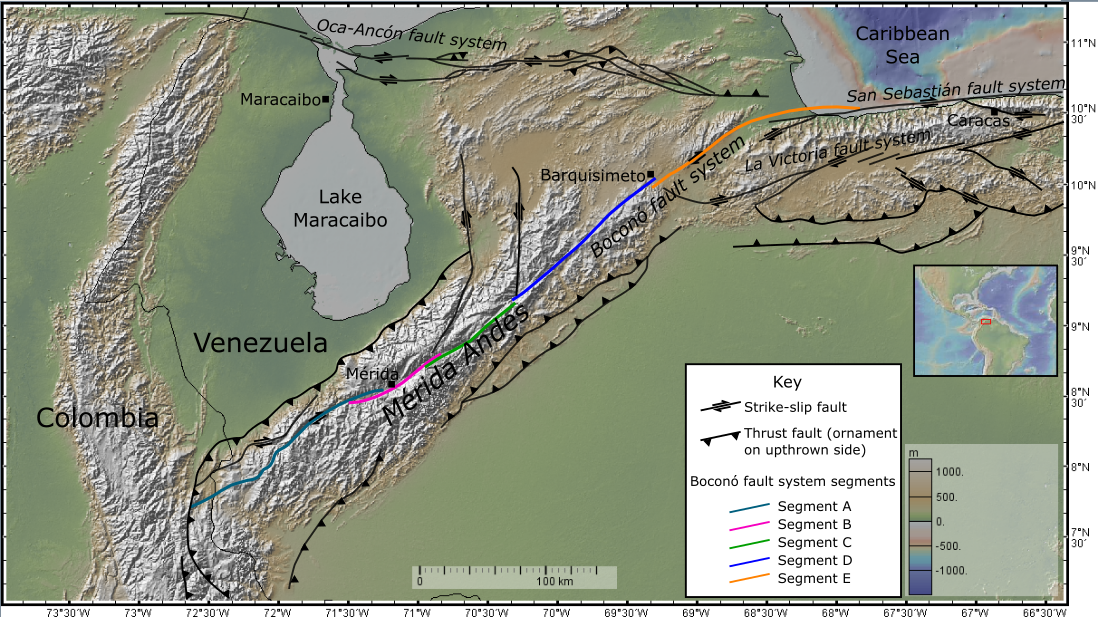
Map of the Boconó Fault, showing the main segments, and the western part of the San Sebastián Fault

The 1812 Caracas earthquake took place in Venezuela on March 26 (on Maundy Thursday) at 4:37 p.m. It measured M 7.7. The earthquake caused extensive damage in Caracas, La Guaira, Barquisimeto, San Felipe, and Mérida. An estimated 15,000–20,000 people perished as a result, in addition to incalculable material damage.

The seismic movement was so significant that in a zone named Valecillo, a new lake was formed and the river Yurubí was dammed up. Numerous rivulets changed their course in the Caracas valley, which was flooded with dirty water.

The earthquake is believed to have consisted of two seismic shocks, individually measuring M_{w} 7.4 and M_{w} 7.1. The first destroyed Caracas and the second Mérida, where it was raining when the shock occurred.

== Tectonic setting ==
Northern Venezuela lies across the complex boundary between the Caribbean plate and the South American plate. The main motion between these two plates is lateral, with South America moving relatively westwards relative to the Caribbean plate, but these is also a component of shortening with South America moving northwards relative to the Caribbean plate. To the west of Venezuela, the Caribbean plate is subducting beneath the South American plate along the South Caribbean Deformed Belt. The lateral motion is accommodated by a series of dextral (right lateral) strike-slip faults, of which the Oca-Ancón fault system and the Boconó-San Sebastián-El Pilar fault system are the most important. The Boconó Fault trends southwest to bortheast until it reaches the coast and links with the Oca-Ancón fault system, which continues parallel to the coast as the San Sebastián Fault. The Boconó-San Sebastián-El Pilar fault system is the most seismically active structure in Venezuela.

== Earthquake ==
The precise details of the earthquake sequence remain uncertain. There is evidence of two separate sub-events, one to the southwest and another with an epicentre just offshore near Caracas. It is unclear which of these two events came first or whether there was a significant time gap between them. One sub-event ruptured the northeasternmost segment of the Boconó Fault, with an estimated magnitude of 7.4 M_{w} while the second sub-event ruptured the San Sebastián Fault offshore Caracas, with an estimated magnitude of 7.1 M_{w}.

== Casualties ==
A wide range of figures were accepted for the dead; between 1,000 and 20,000. The archbishop of Caracas, Narciso Coll y Prat, estimated 10,000 to 12,000 deaths across Venezuela, citing a compilation of numbers reported by priests of his diocese in areas under his jurisdiction following his request. However, not all figures were relayed to him. The lowest figure of 1,000 accounted for deaths in Caracas only and was reported in an 1812 publication. About 500 people died in Cuartel San Carlos, a military center in the city, and 40 were killed when a convent in San Jacinto Plaza collapsed. Anthropologist Rogelio Altez estimated the death toll in Caracas to be around 2,000 by extrapolating data from three funeral books and comparing it with census data during the corresponding period.

== Response ==
The destruction in Caracas was so widespread that the Gazeta de Caracas suggested founding a new capital city in "the beautiful esplanade of Catia where pure air may be breathed..."

Since the earthquake occurred on Maundy Thursday while the Venezuelan War of Independence was raging, it was explained by royalist authorities as divine punishment for the rebellion against the Spanish Crown. The archbishop of Caracas, Narciso Coll y Prat, referred to the event as "the terrifying but well-deserved earthquake" which "confirms in our days the prophecies revealed by God to men about the ancient impious and proud cities: Babylon, Jerusalem and the Tower of Babel" This prompted the widely quoted answer of Simón Bolívar: "If Nature is against us, we shall fight Nature and make it obey".

The first international assistance received by Venezuela in response to the earthquake came from the United States, "when the congress convened in Washington decreed unanimously the sending of five ships loaded with flour, to the coasts of Venezuela to be distributed among the most indigent of its inhabitants." The $50,000 was the first-ever instance of U.S. foreign aid.

== See also ==
- List of earthquakes in Venezuela
- List of historical earthquakes
- 2026 Venezuela earthquakes, another earthquake in the region consisting of multiple sub-events
