= 1929 Arthur's Pass earthquake =

Earthquake in New Zealand

- Location within New Zealand
- UTC time: 1929-03-09 10:50:32
- ISC event: 907935
- USGS-ANSS: ComCat
- Local date: 9 March 1929
- Local time: 22:50 NZST
- Magnitude: 7.1 M_{L}
- Epicentre: 42.791°S 171.928°E
- Type: Oblique-slip
- Areas affected: South Island New Zealand
- Max. intensity: MMI VIII (Severe)
- Casualties: None

The 1929 Arthur's Pass earthquake occurred at 10:50 pm NZMT on 9 March. The sparsely settled region around Arthur's Pass of the Southern Alps shook for four minutes. Tremors continued almost continuously until midnight and sporadic strong aftershocks were felt for several days.

The earthquake was measured at 7.1 on the Richter scale and the intensity of shaking in the epicentral region has been assessed from historical records as VIII (Severe) on the Modified Mercalli Scale. Intensities of VI (Strong) were observed in Christchurch and Westport. The earthquake occurred on the Poulter Fault, which was not identified and mapped until 2001.

== Tectonic setting ==
New Zealand lies along the boundary between the Australian and Pacific plates. In the South Island most of the relative displacement between these plates is taken up along a single dextral (right lateral) strike-slip fault with a major reverse component, the Alpine Fault. In the North Island the displacement is mainly taken up along the Kermadec-Tonga subduction zone, although the remaining dextral strike-slip component is accommodated by the North Island Fault System. The Poulter Fault runs for approximately 50 km east-northeast from near the confluence of the Bealey and Mingha rivers to the valley of the South Hurunui River. Between 16 km and 36 km of the fault ruptured, with dextral displacement of up to 4 metres and dip-slip displacement of 1–2 metres (North side up).

== Effects ==
Numerous landslides were triggered, damaging the Midland Railway and blocking roads. The highway connecting Canterbury and the West Coast via Arthur's Pass was closed for several months. Many water tanks and chimneys were damaged or toppled. Two years after the earthquake, trampers in the Otahake Valley discovered that a 900m high section of the side of a mountain had collapsed, blocking the valley and sending debris 5 km downstream.

Although the earthquake was one of the largest land-based earthquakes to strike New Zealand in the 20th century, it was overshadowed by the more deadly 1929 Murchison earthquake a few months later.

== See also ==
- List of earthquakes in 1929
- List of earthquakes in New Zealand
