= St. Peter and St. Paul Cathedral, Maracaibo =

Coordinates: 10.6414°N 71.6069°W

St. Peter and St. Paul Cathedral
- Catedral de San Pedro y San Pablo de Maracaibo
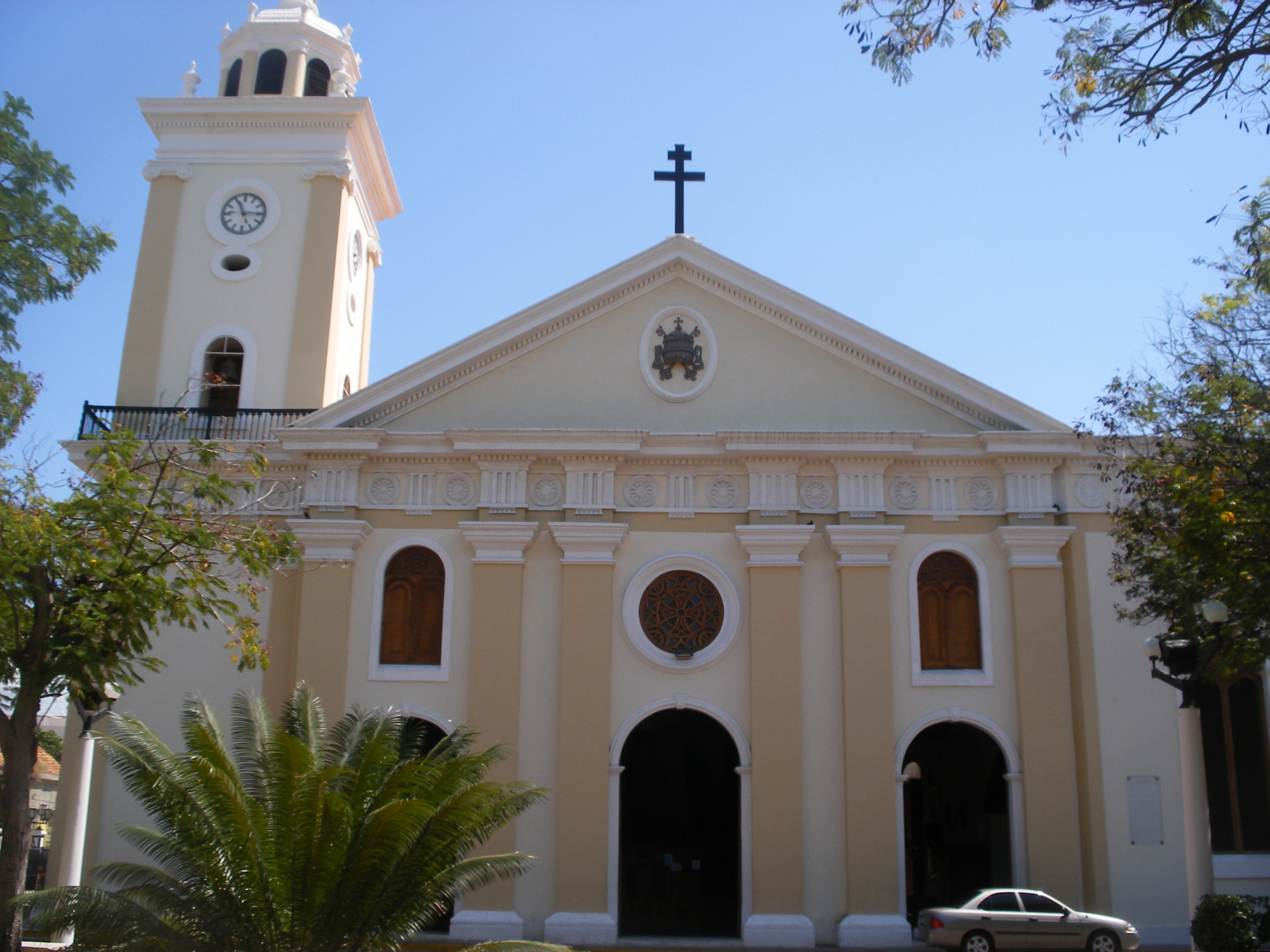
- St. Peter and St. Paul Cathedral
- Location: Maracaibo
- Country: Venezuela
- Denomination: Roman Catholic Church

Administration
- Archdiocese: Roman Catholic Archdiocese of Maracaibo

The St. Peter and St. Paul Cathedral (Spanish: Catedral de San Pedro y San Pablo de Maracaibo) or just Maracaibo Cathedral is the main church of Maracaibo in the Zulia state of Venezuela.

== History ==
It was built in the seventeenth century. Pope Leo XIII designated it as a cathedral on 25 July 1897 and together with the Archbishop's Palace, is the seat of the Roman Catholic Archdiocese of Maracaibo.

It is located in the Bolivar Square, the historic heart of the city of Maracaibo, and is the headquarters of all churches in the Archdiocese and a repository of its history and traditions. The style is neoclassical colonial, unique to the city, with few such buildings existing within Latin America. It was constructed between 1585 and 1650.

In September 2025, a cathedral tower was struck by a series of earthquakes in the state of Zulia.

== See also ==
- List of cathedrals in Venezuela
- Roman Catholicism in Venezuela
- St. Peter and St. Paul Cathedral
