= 1929 Cumaná earthquake =

Earthquake in Venezuela

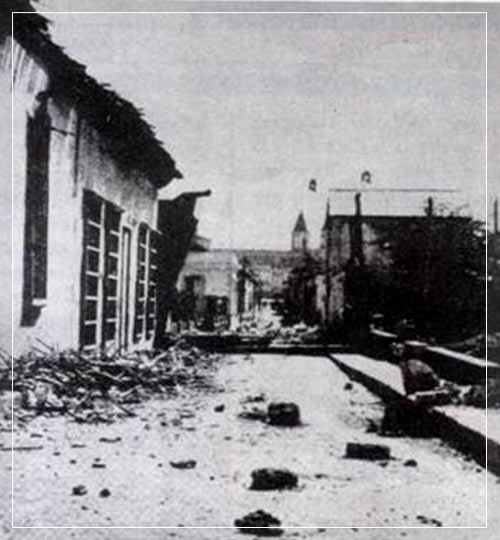

- Location within Venezuela
- UTC time: 1929-01-17 11:45:42
- ISC event: 907860
- USGS-ANSS: ComCat
- Local date: January 17, 1929
- Local time: 7:45 VET
- Duration: 30 seconds
- Magnitude: 6.7 M_{w}
- Depth: 10.0 km (6.2 mi)
- Epicenter: 10.543°N 64.444°W
- Type: Strike-slip
- Areas affected: Venezuela
- Max. intensity: MMI IX (Violent)
- Tsunami: 3 m (9.8 ft)
- Casualties: 200–1,600 dead, 800 injured

The 1929 Cumaná earthquake occurred on January 17 at 07:45:44 local time, affecting Venezuela. Measuring 6.7 on the moment magnitude scale (M_{w}) at a depth of 10 km (6.2 mi), the earthquake severely damaged the city of Cumaná in Sucre state. The earthquake had an epicenter located offshore in the Caribbean Sea, and had a maximum Modified Mercalli intensity scale rating of IX (Violent). It lasted 30 seconds, causing major damage and a tsunami. Although the total death toll is unknown, it may be as high as 1,600.

== Earthquake ==
The earthquake was associated with strike-slip faulting at a shallow depth; a common characteristic for earthquakes of this depth in the region of northern Venezuela. It is one of the most extensively studied earthquakes in Venezuela prior to 1997. The El Pilar Fault System, a right-lateral strike-slip fault extending 350 kilometres (220 mi) from the Cariaco Basin to the Paria Peninsula is thought to be the source of the event. The earthquake in 1929 is thought to have ruptured approximately 30–40 kilometres (19–25 mi) of the fault. Most of the surface rupture was offshore, and only 4 kilometres (2.5 mi) of it was visible at the surface, extending east–west. The surface-wave magnitude (M_{s}) was calculated to be 6.3; a revision of 6.9 which was considered an overestimation. The same fault segment is thought to have partially ruptured during the 1997 Cariaco earthquake, which occurred east of the 1929 event. It is believed that the 1929 earthquake ruptured a segment that was involved in a 1797 event.

== Tsunami ==
At the coast of Cumaná, in Puerto De Sucre, survivors witnessed the a drawback of the sea by as much as 200 meters. The tsunami reportedly swept away some homes located along the shore, killing some 40 individuals. The maximum tsunami height was measured at 3 m (9.8 ft). Cumaná suffered severe damage from the tsunami, and the waves were recorded in four other cities. Two launches, each weighing 5-tons were carried and dumped inland. Boats were destroyed. The maximum tsunami run-up was 6 m (20 ft).

== Impact ==
The earthquake razed to the ground more than 3,500 homes in Cumaná. The shaking which lasted 30 seconds, severely damaged a theater, which has now been converted to a cathedral. The Church of Santa Inés suffered partial destruction of its structure, as well as to the San Antonio de la Eminencia castle. A clock tower on the Church of Santa Inés stopped working at the time the earthquake struck. After the earthquake, new towers were built around the church during restoration works. Ground collapse and landslides were reported. The earthquake was also felt in Barcelona, Margarita, Güiria, Carúpano, Río Caribe, Caracas, and Irapa. No official figure for the death toll exists, although it has been estimated to be as much as eight percent of the population of 20,000. At least 800 people were injured.

== See also ==
- List of earthquakes in 1929
- List of earthquakes in Venezuela
