= List of earthquakes in 1929 =

Earthquakes in 1929
Approximate epicenters of the earthquakes in 1929
- 4.0–5.9 magnitude
- 6.0–6.9 magnitude
- 7.0–7.9 magnitude
- 8.0+ magnitude
- Strongest: United Kingdom, South Sandwich Islands (Magnitude 8.1) June 27
- Deadliest: Turkmen SSR, Ahal Province (Magnitude 7.2) May 1 3,800 deaths
- Total fatalities: 3,972

Number by magnitude
- 9.0+: 0

This is a list of earthquakes in 1929. Only magnitude 6.0 or greater earthquakes appear on the list. Lower magnitude events are included if they have caused death, injury or damage. Events which occurred in remote areas will be excluded from the list as they wouldn't have generated significant media interest. All dates are listed according to UTC time. Several large events occurred this year with the main focus of the activity being in Alaska with 4 magnitude 7.0 + events. The deadliest earthquake struck Turkmenistan in May with 3,800 of the years 3,972 deaths in this event. A rare earthquake struck the north Atlantic Ocean in November with the deaths of 28 in Canada being caused by a tsunami. Dutch East Indies was notably quiet this year.

== Overall ==
=== By death toll ===
Rank	Death toll	Magnitude	Location	MMI	Depth (km)	Date
1	3,800	7.2	Turkmen SSR, Ahal Province	IX (Violent)	10.0	May 1
2	64	6.5	Turkey, Sivas Province	VIII (Severe)	35.0	May 18
3	50	6.7	Venezuela, off the coast of Sucre (state)	IX (Violent)	10.0	January 17
4	28	7.2	Dominion of Newfoundland, off the Grand Banks	VI (Strong)	10.0	November 18
5	17	7.3	New Zealand, Tasman District, South Island	( )	20.0	June 16

- Note: At least 10 casualties

=== By magnitude ===
Rank	Magnitude	Death toll	Location	MMI	Depth (km)	Date
1	8.1	0	United Kingdom, South Sandwich Islands	( )	15.0	June 27
= 2	7.8	0	United States, south of the Aleutian Islands, Alaska	V (Moderate)	15.0	March 7
= 2	7.8	0	United States, Near Islands, Alaska	( )	20.0	December 17
3	7.7	0	Russian SFSR, Kuril Islands	VII (Very strong)	160.0	January 13
= 4	7.3	0	Canada, south of Haida Gwaii	( )	15.0	May 26
= 4	7.3	17	New Zealand, Tasman District, South Island	( )	20.0	June 16
= 4	7.3	0	United States, Andreanof Islands, Alaska	( )	35.0	July 7
= 5	7.2	3,800	Turkmen SSR, Ahal Province	( )	10.0	May 1
= 5	7.2	0	Philippines, Mindanao	X (Extreme)	35.0	June 13
= 5	7.2	28	Canada, south of Newfoundland	VI (Strong)	10.0	November 18
= 6	7.1	0	Afghanistan, Badakhshan Province	( )	200.0	February 1
= 6	7.1	0	central Mid-Atlantic Ridge	( )	10.0	February 2
= 6	7.1	0	northern Mid-Atlantic Ridge	( )	10.0	February 22
= 6	7.1	0	Philippines, southern Mindanao	( )	35.0	June 4
= 6	7.1	0	United States, Federated States of Micronesia, State of Yap	( )	10.0	November 15
= 7	7.0	0	New Zealand, Canterbury, New Zealand	( )	20.0	March 9
= 7	7.0	0	United States, Andreanof Islands, Alaska	( )	35.0	July 5
= 7	7.0	0	Philippines, off the southeast coast of Mindanao	( )	35.0	November 17

- Note: At least 7.0 magnitude

== Notable events ==
=== January ===
January
- Strongest: 7.7 M_{w} Russian SFSR
- Deadliest: 6.7 M_{w} Venezuela; 50 deaths
- Total fatalities: 52

Number by magnitude
- 8.0–8.9: 0
- 7.0–7.9: 1
- 6.0–6.9: 6
- 5.0–5.9: 1

Date	Country and location	M_{w}	Depth (km)	MMI	Notes	Casualties	
Date	Country and location	M_{w}	Depth (km)	MMI	Notes	Dead	Injured
13	Russian SFSR, Kuril Islands	7.7	160.0	VII			
13	China, Inner Mongolia	6.0	0.0	VIII	2 people were killed and 100 homes were destroyed. Depth unknown.	2	
16	Philippines, Luzon	6.2	25.0				
17	Venezuela, off the coast of Sucre (state)	6.7	10.0	IX	50 people were killed and 800 were injured during the 1929 Cumaná earthquake. Major damage was caused.	50	800
19	British Burma, Kachin State	5.5	0.0	IX	Some damage was caused. Depth unknown.		
21	United States, central Alaska	6.2	35.0				
22	Italian Somaliland, off the northwest coast	6.0	35.0				
24	Guatemala, off the south coast	6.9	15.0				

=== February ===
February
- Strongest: 7.1 M_{w} 3 events
- Total fatalities: 0

Number by magnitude
- 8.0–8.9: 0
- 7.0–7.9: 3
- 6.0–6.9: 4

Date	Country and location	M_{w}	Depth (km)	MMI	Notes	Casualties	
Date	Country and location	M_{w}	Depth (km)	MMI	Notes	Dead	Injured
1	Afghanistan, Badakhshan Province	7.1	200.0		Fairly heavy damage was caused.		
2	central Mid-Atlantic Ridge	7.1	10.0				
6	Russian SFSR, Kuril Islands	6.8	165.0				
10	Guatemala, off the south coast	6.7	30.0				
14	Japan, Ryukyu Islands	6.0	35.0				
22	northern Mid-Atlantic Ridge	7.1	10.0				
26	United States, Alaska Peninsula	6.4	30.0				

=== March ===
March
- Strongest: 7.8 M_{w} United States
- Total fatalities: 0

Number by magnitude
- 8.0–8.9: 0
- 7.0–7.9: 2
- 6.0–6.9: 3

Date	Country and location	M_{w}	Depth (km)	MMI	Notes	Casualties	
Date	Country and location	M_{w}	Depth (km)	MMI	Notes	Dead	Injured
3	Afghanistan, Badakhshan Province	6.2	250.0				
7	United States, south of the Aleutian Islands	7.8	15.0	V	A tsunami was reported which caused some damage.		
9	New Zealand, Canterbury, New Zealand	7.0	20.0		1929 Arthur's Pass earthquake		
10	United States, Northern Mariana Islands	6.6	200.0				
21	Guatemala, off the south coast	6.4	35.0				

=== April ===
April
- Strongest: 6.6 M_{w} Philippines
- Total fatalities: 0

Number by magnitude
- 8.0–8.9: 0
- 7.0–7.9: 0
- 6.0–6.9: 2

Date	Country and location	M_{w}	Depth (km)	MMI	Notes	Casualties	
Date	Country and location	M_{w}	Depth (km)	MMI	Notes	Dead	Injured
8	Philippines, Mindanao	6.6	610.0				
17	Japan, off the east coast of Honshu	6.0	100.0				

=== May ===
May
- Strongest: 7.3 M_{w} Canada
- Deadliest: 7.2 M_{w} Turkmen SSR; 3,800 deaths
- Total fatalities: 3,864

Number by magnitude
- 8.0–8.9: 0
- 7.0–7.9: 2
- 6.0–6.9: 6

Date	Country and location	M_{w}	Depth (km)	MMI	Notes	Casualties	
Date	Country and location	M_{w}	Depth (km)	MMI	Notes	Dead	Injured
1	Turkmen SSR, Ahal Province	7.2	10.0		Major damage was caused in the 1929 Kopet Dag earthquake. 3,800 people were killed.	3,800	
7	Dutch East Indies, off the north coast of Papua (province)	6.5	25.0				
18	Ethiopian Empire, Afar Region	6.0	35.0				
18	Turkey, Sivas Province	6.5	35.0	VIII	The 1929 Suşehri earthquake killed 64 people.	64	
21	Japan, off the east coast of Kyushu	6.7	35.0				
25	Peru, Ucayali Region	6.8	160.0				
26	Canada, south of Haida Gwaii	7.3	15.0		Some damage was caused and a tsunami was observed.		
30	Argentina, Mendoza Province	6.6	10.0				

=== June ===
June
- Strongest: 8.1 M_{w} United Kingdom
- Deadliest: 7.3 M_{w} New Zealand; 17 deaths
- Total fatalities: 17

Number by magnitude
- 8.0–8.9: 1
- 7.0–7.9: 3
- 6.0–6.9: 9

Date	Country and location	M_{w}	Depth (km)	MMI	Notes	Casualties	
Date	Country and location	M_{w}	Depth (km)	MMI	Notes	Dead	Injured
2	Japan, off the south coast of Honshu	6.9	350.4				
3	Kazakh ASSR, Kyzylorda Region	6.5	35.0				
4	Philippines, Davao Gulf, Mindanao	7.1	200.0				
9	Russian SFSR, Kuril Islands	6.5	35.0		Foreshock to event on June 13.		
12	New Guinea, East Sepik Province	6.6	120.0				
13	Russian SFSR, Kuril Islands	6.9	35.0				
13	Philippines, Mindanao	7.2	35.0	X	Many homes were destroyed.		
13	Philippines, east of Mindanao	6.4	35.0		Aftershock.		
16	New Zealand, Tasman District	7.3	20.0		17 people died in the 1929 Murchison earthquake. Many homes were destroyed.	17	
19	Philippines, east of Mindanao	6.4	35.0		Aftershock.		
20	Dutch East Indies, East Java	6.2	60.0				
27	United Kingdom, South Sandwich Islands	8.1	15.0				
30	Philippines, east of Mindanao	6.5	30.0		Aftershock.		

=== July ===
July
- Strongest: 7.3 M_{w} United States
- Deadliest: 6.2 M_{w} Iran; 6 deaths
- Total fatalities: 11

Number by magnitude
- 8.0–8.9: 0
- 7.0–7.9: 2
- 6.0–6.9: 6
- 5.0–5.9: 1

Date	Country and location	M_{w}	Depth (km)	MMI	Notes	Casualties	
Date	Country and location	M_{w}	Depth (km)	MMI	Notes	Dead	Injured
3	United States, central Alaska	6.2	35.0				
4	United States, central Alaska	6.5	20.0				
5	United States, Andreanof Islands, Alaska	7.0	35.0		Foreshock.		
5	United States, Andreanof Islands, Alaska	6.5	25.0		Foreshock.		
7	United States, Andreanof Islands, Alaska	7.3	35.0				
13	Iran, North Khorasan Province	5.8	57.0		5 people were killed and some damage was caused.	5	
15	Iran, Khuzestan Province	6.2	35.0		6 people died and some damage was caused.	6	
23	Iceland, Reykjavík	6.2	10.0	X			
26	Japan, Yamanashi Prefecture, Honshu	6.5	60.0				

=== August ===
August
- Strongest: 6.6 M_{w} British Burma
- Total fatalities: 0

Number by magnitude
- 8.0–8.9: 0
- 7.0–7.9: 0
- 6.0–6.9: 4

Date	Country and location	M_{w}	Depth (km)	MMI	Notes	Casualties	
Date	Country and location	M_{w}	Depth (km)	MMI	Notes	Dead	Injured
1	India, Andaman Islands	6.5	35.0				
3	Western Samoa Trust Territory, south of	6.5	35.0				
8	British Burma, Magway Region	6.6	15.0				
19	Taiwan, off the east coast	6.5	35.0				

=== September ===
September
- Strongest: 6.5 M_{w} Iran
- Total fatalities: 0

Number by magnitude
- 8.0–8.9: 0
- 7.0–7.9: 0
- 6.0–6.9: 3

Date	Country and location	M_{w}	Depth (km)	MMI	Notes	Casualties	
Date	Country and location	M_{w}	Depth (km)	MMI	Notes	Dead	Injured
3	Iran, Sistan and Baluchestan Province	6.5	110.0				
21	Philippines, south of Leyte	6.0	300.0				
27	Mexico, Gulf of California	6.0	35.0				

=== October ===
October
- Strongest: 6.8 M_{w} Chile
- Total fatalities: 0

Number by magnitude
- 8.0–8.9: 0
- 7.0–7.9: 0
- 6.0–6.9: 7

Date	Country and location	M_{w}	Depth (km)	MMI	Notes	Casualties	
Date	Country and location	M_{w}	Depth (km)	MMI	Notes	Dead	Injured
5	Russian SFSR, eastern Kamchatka	6.3	50.0				
6	United States, Hawaii (island)	6.4	10.0				
8	New Zealand, Kermadec Islands	6.5	35.0				
16	British Burma, Kachin State	6.3	15.0				
19	Chile, Antofagasta Region	6.8	65.0				
19	Chile, Antofagasta Region	6.0	100.0		Aftershock.		
24	Taiwan, southwest of	6.5	35.0				

=== November ===
November
- Strongest: 7.2 M_{w} northern Atlantic Ocean
- Deadliest: 7.2 M_{w} northern Atlantic Ocean; 28 deaths
- Total fatalities: 28

Number by magnitude
- 8.0–8.9: 0
- 7.0–7.9: 3
- 6.0–6.9: 2

Date	Country and location	M_{w}	Depth (km)	MMI	Notes	Casualties	
Date	Country and location	M_{w}	Depth (km)	MMI	Notes	Dead	Injured
5	Philippines, off the east coast of Mindanao	6.2	35.0				
15	United States, Federated States of Micronesia, State of Yap	7.1	10.0				
17	Philippines, off the southeast coast of Mindanao	7.0	35.0				
18	northern Atlantic Ocean	7.2	10.0	VI	The 1929 Grand Banks earthquake was one of the largest on record in this area. The earthquake generated a tsunami which affected Newfoundland, Canada. 28 people were killed and property damage costs were $1 million (1929 rate).	28	
23	Dutch East Indies, Papua (province)	6.8	35.0				

=== December ===
December
- Strongest: 7.8 M_{w} United States
- Total fatalities: 0

Number by magnitude
- 8.0–8.9: 0
- 7.0–7.9: 1
- 6.0–6.9: 2

Date	Country and location	M_{w}	Depth (km)	MMI	Notes	Casualties	
Date	Country and location	M_{w}	Depth (km)	MMI	Notes	Dead	Injured
9	Dutch East Indies, off the west coast of Sumatra	6.7	25.0				
17	United States, Near Islands, Alaska	7.8	20.0				
27	Dutch East Indies, Ceram Sea	6.5	230.0				
