= 1929 Kopet Dag earthquake =

Earthquake centered on the Iran-Turkmenistan border

- Location within Iran
- UTC time: 1929-05-01 15:37:36
- ISC event: 908052
- USGS-ANSS: ComCat
- Local date: 1 May 1929
- Local time: 20:37:36
- Magnitude: 7.2 M_{w}
- Depth: 10 km (6.2 mi)
- Epicenter: 38.12°N 57.74°E
- Type: Oblique-thrust
- Areas affected: Iran, Turkmenistan
- Max. intensity: MMI IX (Violent)
- Casualties: 3,257–3,800 dead 1,121 injured

The 1929 Kopet Dag earthquake (also called the 1929 Koppeh Dagh earthquake) took place at 15:37 UTC on 1 May with a moment magnitude of 7.2 and a maximum Mercalli intensity of IX (Violent). It occurred in the Kopet Dag area of Iran and caused up to 3,800 casualties along the Iran-Turkmenistan border. More than 1,100 were injured.

== Damage and casualties ==
Within the epicentral area, 3,250 people were killed. Eighty-eight villages in the region were damaged or destroyed, along with damage at Bojnourd. Aftershocks occurred for more than four years after, including one in July 1929 that killed several more people, before finally subsiding in 1933. Fifty-seven diverse locations reported damage, including casualties in Ashgabat, Turkmenistan. Surface faulting occurred along the Baghan-Germab fault for a length of 50 kilometers (31 mi).

== See also ==
- List of earthquakes in 1929
- List of earthquakes in Iran
