= 1929 Suşehri earthquake =

Earthquake in Turkey

- Location within Turkey
- UTC time: 1929-05-18 06:37:55
- ISC event: 908082
- USGS-ANSS: ComCat
- Local date: 18 May 1929
- Magnitude: M_{w} 6.3
- Depth: 15 km (9 mi)
- Epicenter: 40.266°N 38.096°E
- Fault: North Anatolian Fault
- Areas affected: Turkey
- Max. intensity: MSK-64 VIII (Damaging)
- Casualties: 64 fatalities, 72 injuries

The 1929 Suşehri earthquake affected Sivas Province, Turkey on 18 May at 06:37 UTC. The moment magnitude 6.3 shock centered north of Suşehri had a depth of 15 km (9.3 mi). The New York Times reported 64 deaths and 72 injuries from 74 villages affected by the earthquake. The worst affected towns were Karahisar and Suşehri. A total of 1,357 buildings were damaged across 20 villages. All public buildings and many homes in Suşehri were damaged and unsuitable for living.

== See also ==
- List of earthquakes in 1929
- List of earthquakes in Turkey
