= Falling Mountain =

Mountain in the Canterbury Region of New Zealand

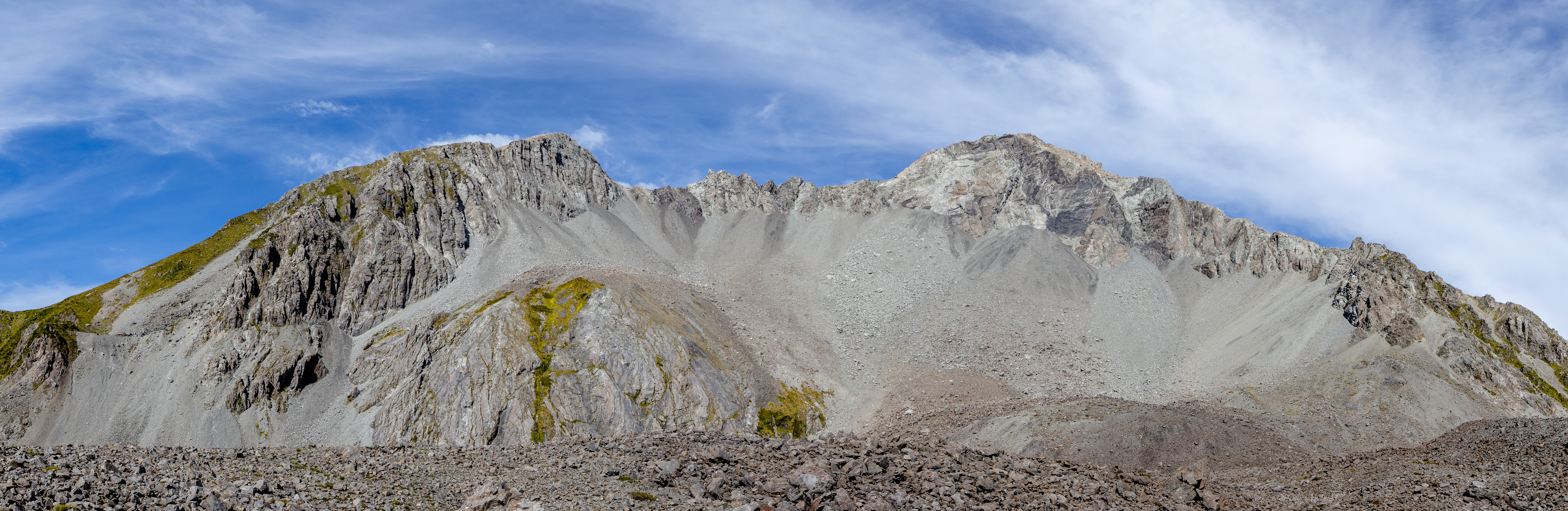
- West aspect

Highest point
- Elevation: 1,901 m (6,237 ft)
- Prominence: 241 m (791 ft)
- Isolation: 2.96 km (1.84 mi)
- Coordinates: 42.89958°S 171.68733°E

Geography
- Location within New Zealand
- Interactive map of Falling Mountain
- Location: South Island
- Country: New Zealand
- Region: Canterbury / West Coast
- Protected area: Arthur's Pass National Park
- Parent range: Southern Alps
- Topo map(s): Topo50 BV21; NZMS260 K33

Geology
- Rock age: Triassic
- Rock type: Rakaia Terrane

Climbing
- First ascent: December 1930

Falling Mountain is a 1,901-metre-elevation (6,237-foot) mountain in New Zealand.

== Description ==
Falling Mountain is located 115 kilometres (71 mi) northwest of Christchurch on the boundary of Arthur's Pass National Park. It is set along the crest or Main Divide of the Southern Alps and is situated on the boundary shared by the West Coast and Canterbury Regions of the South Island. Precipitation runoff from the mountain's east slope drains into the headwaters of the East Branch Otehake River, whereas the west slope drains into the headwaters of the Edwards River. Topographic relief is significant as the summit rises 700 metres (2,297 feet) above the East Branch Otehake in one kilometre. The nearest higher peak is Mount Oates, 3.4 kilometres to the northwest. The mountain's toponym was applied following the 1929 Arthur's Pass earthquake that caused a section of the 900-metre-high northwest side of the mountain to collapse and virtually split the mountain in two. The first ascent of the summit was made on 10 December 1930 by C.E. Fenwick, H.F. Baird, and H. McD Vincent via the South West Ridge.

== Climate ==
Based on the Köppen climate classification, Falling Mountain is located in a marine west coast (Cfb) climate zone, with a subpolar oceanic climate (Cfc) at the summit. Prevailing westerly winds blow moist air from the Tasman Sea onto the mountains, where the air is forced upwards by the mountains (orographic lift), causing moisture to drop in the form of rain or snow. The months of December through February offer the most favourable weather for viewing or climbing this peak.

== Gallery ==
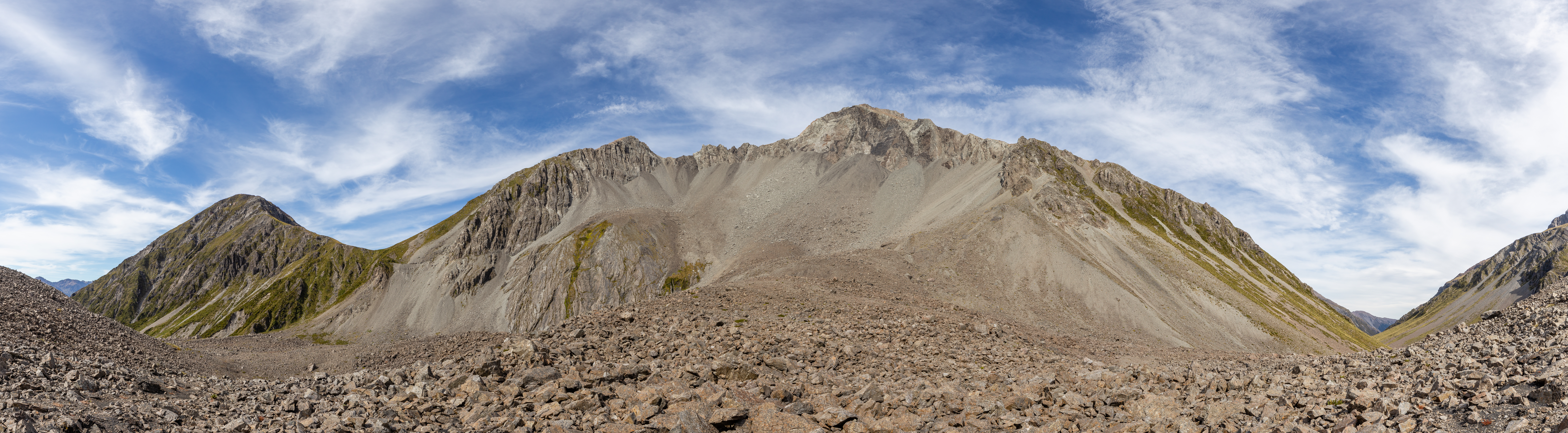

== See also ==
- List of mountains of New Zealand by height
