= Boconó Fault =

Geological fault in Venezuela

- Falla Boconó
- Location of the fault in Venezuela
- Etymology: Boconó, Trujillo
- Location: Northern South America
- Coordinates: 9°15′N 70°16′W
- Country: Colombia; Venezuela
- Region: Andean
- State: Norte de Santander, Santander; Mérida, Táchira
- Cities: Cúcuta

Characteristics
- Range: Mérida Andes, Eastern Ranges
- Part of: Boconó-San Sebastián-El Pilar Fault System
- Length: 500 km (310 mi)
- Strike: NE-SW
- Displacement: 4.3–6.1 mm (0.17–0.24 in)/yr

Tectonics
- Plate: South American
- Status: Active
- Earthquakes: 1610, 1894
- Type: Strike-slip fault
- Movement: Dextral
- Age: Holocene
- Orogeny: Andean

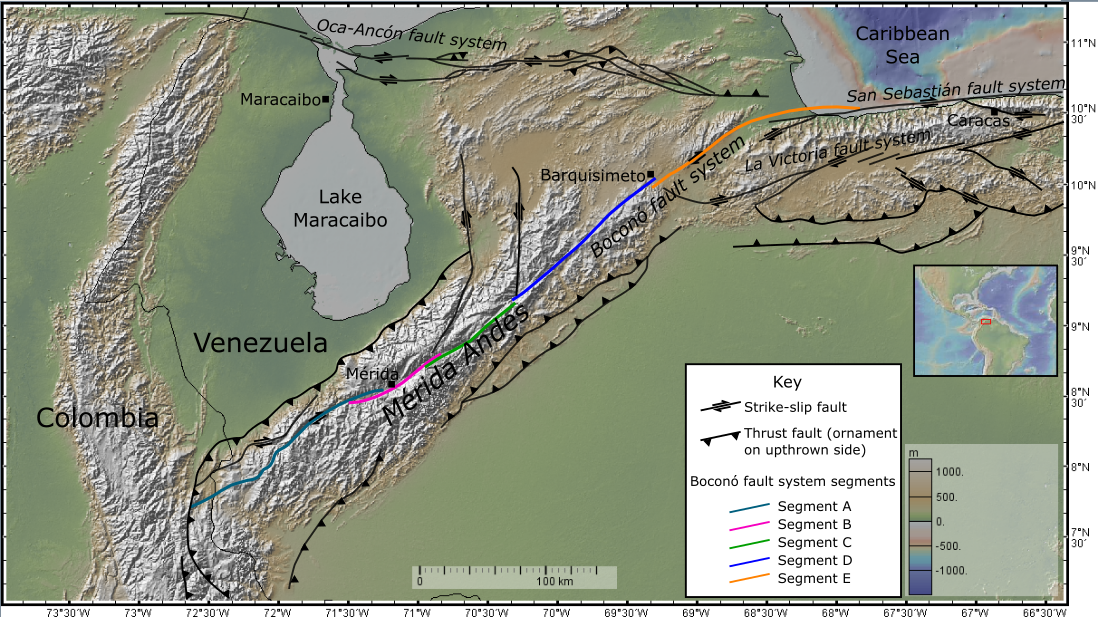
Map showing the segments of the Boconó Fault and links to other structure

The Boconó Fault is a complex of geological faults located in the Eastern Ranges of northeastern Colombia and the Mérida Andes of northwestern Venezuela. The fault has a NE-SW orientation; it is a strike-slip fault and has a dextral (right-lateral) relative movement. It extends over a length of 500 kilometres (310 mi). The fault, with a slip rate ranging from 4.3 to 6.1 millimetres (0.17 to 0.24 in) per year, has been active since the Early Holocene and several major historical earthquakes are associated with it. It forms part of the southeastern boundary to the North Andes Block, accommodating its northeastward motion relative to the South American plate.

== Geometry ==
The Boconó Fault has been subdivided into five segments along its length, labelled A–E, starting from the southwestern end. Segment A, referred to as the "South of Merida" section, runs for 181 km from near Cucuta, just in Colombia, to Mérida. In Columbia it links to the left-lateral reverse fault system comprising the Chinacota and Chucarima faults. Near Merida it overlaps with segment B, forming the Gónzales pull-apart basin. Segment B runs for 83.8 km from Santa Cruz de Mora in the southwest to Los Frailes in the northeast. Segment C extends for 89 km from Mucuchíes in the southwest to Anzoátegui in the northeast. Segment C links to segment D across a restraining stepover near Anzoátegui, from where the latter segment runs for 150 km as far as Barquisimeto, terminating as releasing stepover with segment E. Segment E extends for 176 km from Cabudare to the coast near Morón, where it links to the mainly offshore San Sebastián Fault.

== Seismicity ==
Two major historical earthquakes are associated with segment A, in 1610 and 1894. An earthquake in 1673 has been linked to movement on segment B, with another the following year in 1674 linked to segment C. Two poorly understood earthquakes in 1736 and 1801 may be associated with slip on segment D. In 1812, segment E ruptured in a highly destructive earthquake, which also ruptured part of the San Sebastián Fault in a separate sub-event.
