= 1929 Murchison earthquake =

Earthquake in New Zealand

- Location within New Zealand
- UTC time: 1929-06-16 22:47:30
- ISC event: 908150
- USGS-ANSS: ComCat
- Local date: 17 June 1929
- Local time: 10:17
- Magnitude: M_{s} 7.8, M_{w} 7.3
- Depth: 12 km (7.5 mi)
- Epicentre: 41.55°S 172.25°E
- Areas affected: South Island, New Zealand
- Max. intensity: MMI X (Extreme)
- Casualties: 17 deaths, others injured

The 1929 Murchison earthquake occurred at 10:17 am on 17 June. It struck the Murchison region of the South Island, with an estimated magnitude of 7.3, and was felt throughout New Zealand. There were 17 deaths, mostly as a result of landslides triggered by the earthquake. The rumbling sound of the earthquake was loud enough to be heard at New Plymouth, more than 250 km (155 mi) away.

== Tectonic setting ==
New Zealand sits astride the boundary between the Indo-Australian plate and the Pacific plate. In the South Island most of the displacement is taken up on the Alpine Fault passing to the north onto a set of strike-slip faults, the Marlborough fault system. The sense of displacement across the plate boundary is oblique and most of the faults have a reverse component of slip. Some of the resulting deformation is accommodated within the plates themselves away from the boundary. The 1929 Murchison earthquake occurred on the White Creek Fault, located in the Buller Gorge.

== Damage ==
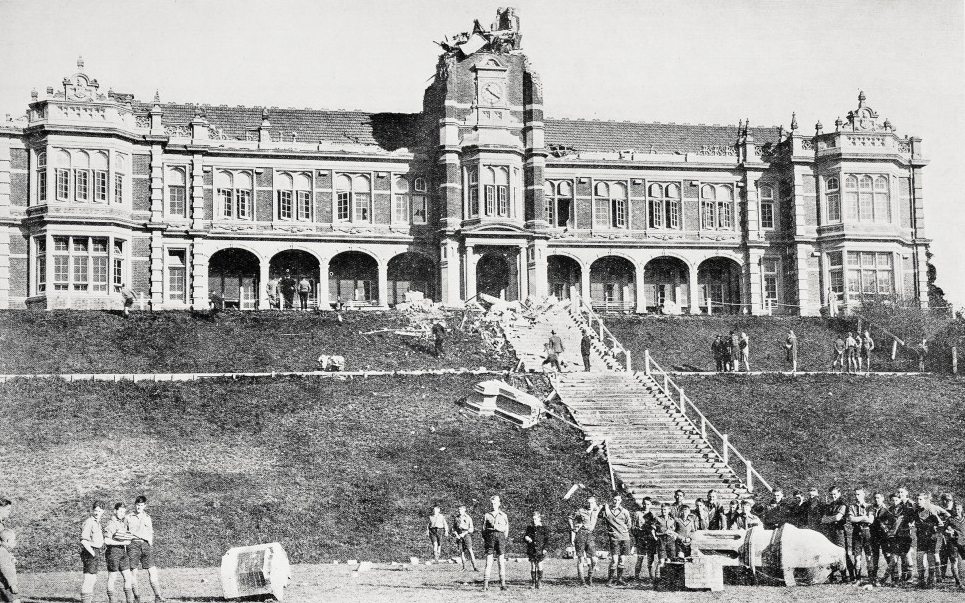
Wreckage of the tower of the main building at Nelson College following the earthquake

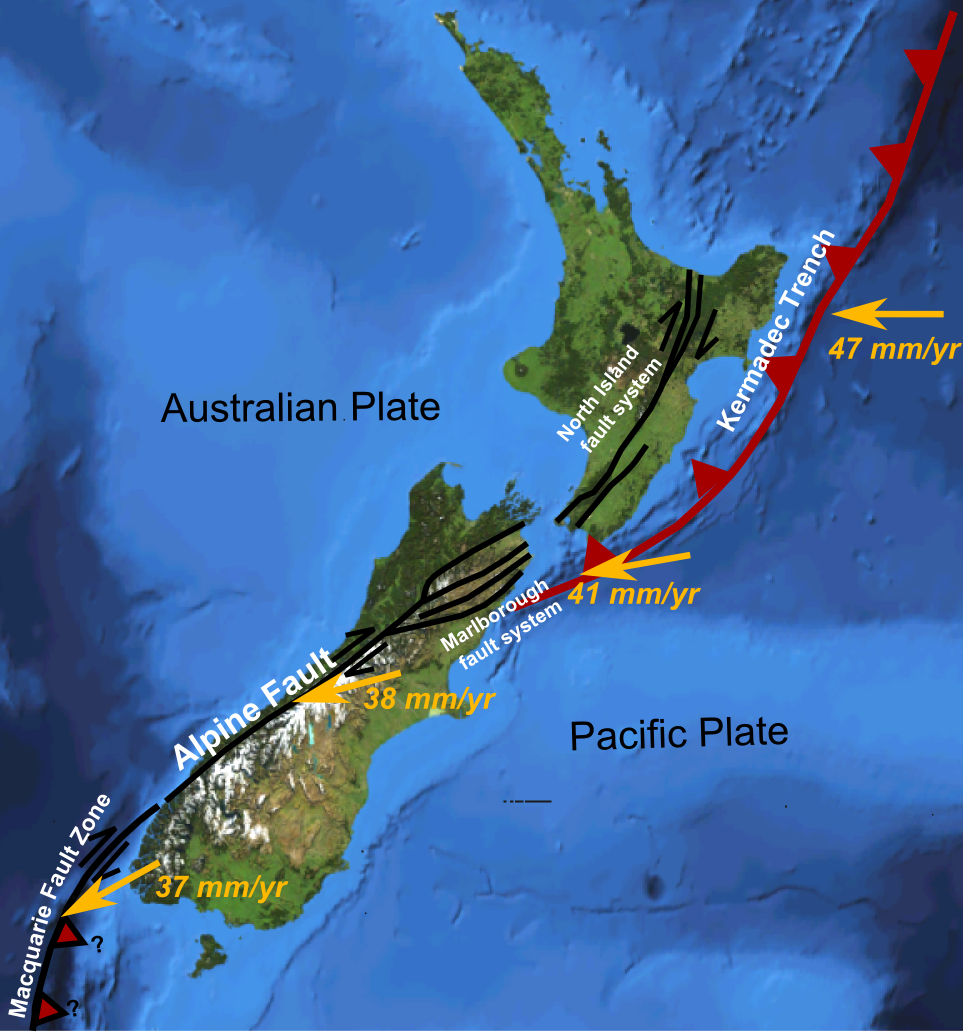
Major active fault zones of New Zealand showing variation in displacement vector of Pacific plate relative to Australian plate along the boundary

Although the epicentre was in a sparsely populated area about 65 km (40 mi) north of Murchison, the shaking in the surrounding region was intense enough to cause damage over a wide area. The towns of Nelson, Greymouth and Westport were all affected and roads, buildings and bridges were severely damaged throughout an area estimated at 26,000 km^{2} (10,000 mi^{2}). The worst damage was caused by landslides triggered by the shaking, which destroyed several homes and resulted in 14 of the 17 deaths. Two other deaths were caused by coal mine collapses. Most of the buildings in the Murchison area were built of wood and were warped and moved from their piles, but many brick buildings and chimneys were damaged in Nelson, Greymouth and Westport.

== Characteristics ==
The earthquake was preceded by several foreshocks before the mainshock, accompanied by booming sounds in the mountains around Murchison. There was a large surface fault rupture visible in the Buller River, indicating about 4.5 m (14.8 ft) of vertical movement and 2.5 m (8.2 ft) of lateral movement. The earthquake triggered many landslides and these created 38 new lakes, of which 21 still exist, including Lake Stanley, on Stanley River. The Maruia Falls are also a notable by-product of the earthquake. The earthquake was accompanied by unusually loud rumbling noises that were heard as far away as New Plymouth. A maximum intensity of X (Extreme) on the Mercalli intensity scale has been estimated for Murchison. Most of the northern part of South Island suffered an intensity of VII (Very strong) or greater.

== Aftermath ==
The landslides blocked many roads causing food supplies to run out in some areas near the epicentre. This and the risk of aftershocks and flooding from landslides blocking rivers caused many residents to evacuate the area, mostly on foot. Karamea was completely cut off and received no outside help for two weeks, until a de Havilland Tiger Moth plane landed on the beach. Some of the blocked roads took months to clear.

== Importance for studying the Earth's interior ==
Analysing the seismic waves from this earthquake appearing in the shadow zone, Inge Lehmann demonstrated that there must be a solid inner core that reflected p-waves.

== See also ==
- List of earthquakes in 1929
- List of earthquakes in New Zealand
