= 1997 Cariaco earthquake =

Earthquake in Venezuela

- Location within Venezuela
- UTC time: 1997-07-09 19:24:14
- ISC event: 1036154
- USGS-ANSS: ComCat
- Local date: July 9, 1997
- Local time: 15:24:14 VET
- Magnitude: 6.9 M_{w}
- Depth: 20 km (12 mi)
- Epicenter: 10.45°N 63.58°W
- Fault: El Pilar Fault
- Type: Strike-slip
- Total damage: $81 million
- Max. intensity: MMI VIII (Severe)
- Casualties: 80–81 dead 522–683 injured 3,000–3,500 displaced

The 1997 Cariaco earthquake occurred on July 9 at 15:24:14 local time with a moment magnitude of 6.9 and a maximum Mercalli intensity of VIII (Severe). With its epicenter along the El Pilar Fault near Cariaco, Venezuela, at least 81 people were killed and over 500 were injured. Damage in this strike-slip earthquake totaled $81 million.

== Geological Context ==
The 1997 earthquake took place in the state of Sucre, Venezuela within the town of Cariaco. Cariaco lies on the edge of the country, situated along the Golf of Paria and connected to the Caribbean Sea. Land-wise, Venezuela is territorially diverse. The country is inhabited by mountainous regions, jungles, numerous waterways, and drylands. This earthquake is recognized to have occurred along the El Pilar Fault. The fault system spans from the Gulf of Cariaco, along which a basin is present, all the way to Northeastern Trinidad. The tectonic activity of the region is heavily resultant of the fault line system in question.

== Tectonic setting ==
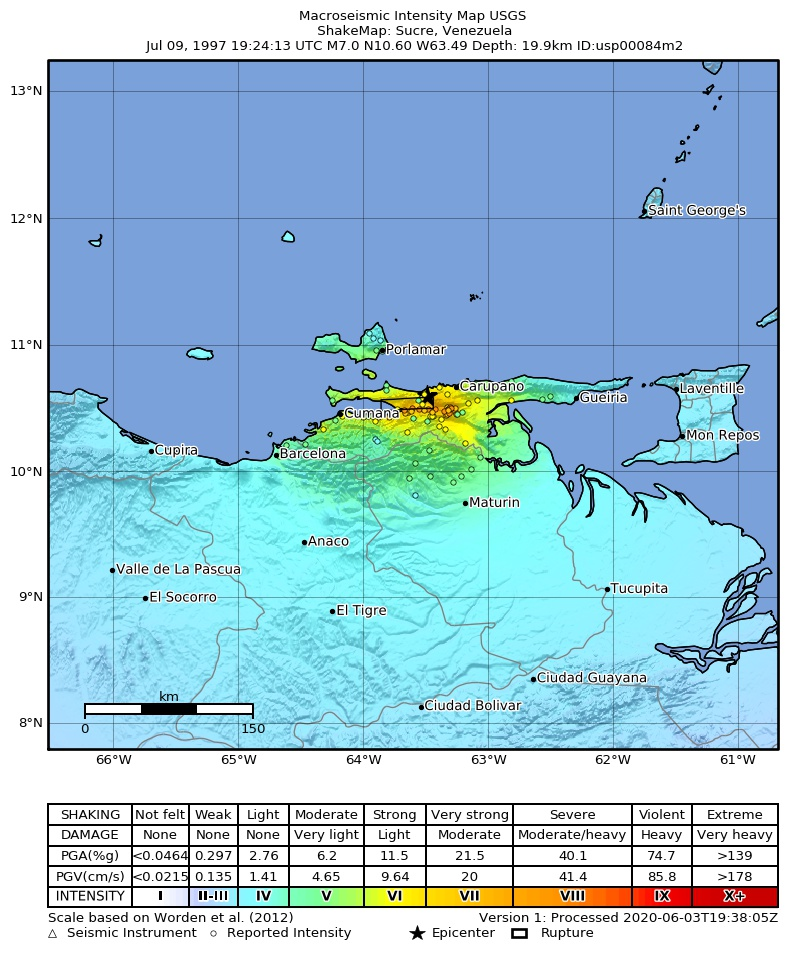
ShakeMap - the intensity of seismic activities of the Cariaco earthquake in the region

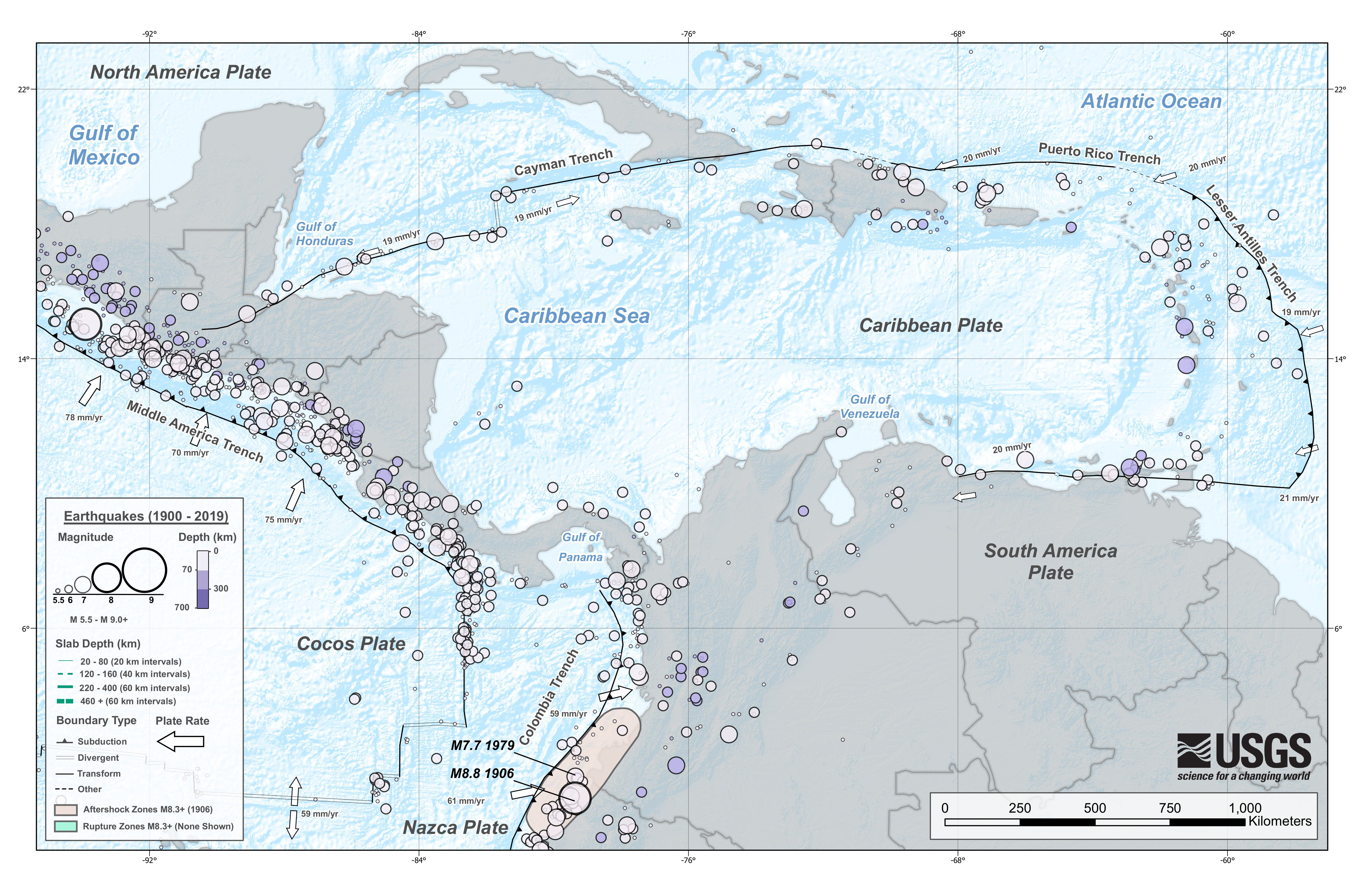
Map of tectonic settings and seismic activities of the Caribbean region, including the El Pilar fault and surrounding plates

The El Pilar fault is the most significant strike-slip fault in this collision belt. The eastern Cordillera de la Costa was located on the east of the fault. It is composed of Lower Cretaceous metasediments and igneous rocks developed in a tectonically and volcanically active environment. The Serranı'a del Interior, a fold and thrust belt made up of Cretaceous and Paleogene sediments, was located south of the fault. The Serranı'a del Interior is featured by the steeply dipping fault that runs east-northeast and north–south.

The El Pilar fault zone spans approximately 300 kilometers between the Gulf of Cariaco and the Paria peninsula. The depth of the El Pilar fault is not clearly defined. A steep gravity gradient across the fault indicates that the fault is approximately vertical down to a depth of at least 5 to 10 km. Another study derived a depth of 15 to 20 km from a holistic analysis of seismic, magnetic, and gravimetric data.

== Earthquake ==
The earthquake occurred east of the Gulf of Cariaco along the El Pilar Fault with a magnitude of 6.9. The International Seismological Centre estimated a hypocenter depth of 5±2.3 km. The United States Geological Survey located the epicenter north of the El Pilar fault near the towns of Cariaco and Casanay and derived a focal depth of 10 km. Moment-tensor mechanism indicated right-lateral, strike-slip motion on an east–west nodal plane dipping steeply to the north.

Previous earthquakes occurring in 1530, 1684, 1797, 1853, and 1929 induced soil liquefaction, resulting in the poor soil condition in that area. This increased site amplification and other earthquake-induced events such as landslides, and thus enhanced the damage experienced. Several submarine landslides around the area of the western slope of the Manzanares River delta. There are reports of a lowering of the sea surface on the northeastern and southeastern coast. No tsunami was recorded.

=== Damage ===
Resulting from the initial 6.9 magnitude quake, 73 fatalities were identified. This primarily resulted from infrastructure weakness and inability to withstand the felt shaking. A great amount of damage was seen in homes near to the epicenter. Construction of such homes reflected the Bahareque style, being composed of primarily natural elements such as cane and mud. Liquefaction took place in regions proximal to bodies of water following the quake, contributing to some of the sustained damage. Additionally, many water pipelines were damaged thus interrupting the water supply of many. Of the 73 fatalities, 21 were killed by the collapse of a 6 story tall building located in the city of Cumana on the edge of the Gulf of Cariaco. Additionally, more than half of those who withstood injuries, 360 of 531, were too in proximity of the epicenter.

=== Aftershocks ===
From July 18 to August 21, the strong-motion network detected approximately 71 different aftershock events, 10 of them had a Ml > 3.5. The two strongest aftershocks were measured on July 30, 1997, and August 12, 1997, both had a Ml of 5.1, recorded at the stations Casanay (CAP) and Agua Caliente (AGS), respectively.

== Related events ==
2018 Venezuela earthquake: On August 21, 2018, a magnitude 7.3 intermediate-depth earthquake occurred along the San Sebastian – El Pilar Fault. In regard to location, it occurred where subduction of the South American plate beneath the Caribbean plate takes place. The epicenter was located proximal to the city of Yaguaraparo. Impact was experienced in various regions including Caracas, Cumana, Bogata, Trinidad and Tobago, Guyana, Grenada, Barbados, and St.Lucia. A witness in the Venezuelan town of Cumana detailed injuries resulting from an escalator collapse within a local shopping center. In Trinidad, reports spoke of cracked walls and dislodged glass panels within a supermarket building causing vehicular damage. In Bogata, Columbia, their international airport was temporarily closed to assess damage sustained by their runways. This was the largest regional earthquake since the 1997 Cariaco earthquake.

2009 Venezuela earthquake: On September 12, 2009, a magnitude 6.4 shallow depth earthquake occurred presumably along the San Sebastian – El Pilar Fault. The epicenter of this quake was in closest proximity to the capital of Venezuela, Caracas. Although this particular earthquake has not been greatly investigated, reports confirm at least 14 people were injured and damage dealt to a few buildings. Numerous cities and towns within Northern and Central Venezuela experienced the impact.

== Response ==
Reports do not detail human responses to the event. From what has been recorded, the Venezuelan people relied on regional and national efforts for recovery. No international intervention was needed. Red Cross staff and additional aiding bodies participated in rescue efforts including providing food and first aid to those in need.

Mitigation: Following the 1997 Cariaco earthquake, the country of Venezuela began to question the safety and security of their school buildings infrastructure. Four school buildings were devastated and 35 others sustained great damage. This lead the country to ultimately devise a program to address structural short-comings. Of the buildings collapsed, failure was recognized as the result of low longitudinal structural resistance, small/short column lengths, and restricted energy dissipation ability. Many of the schools throughout Venezuela were identified as being old-type (established around 50 years ago) and box-type (established 20–30 years ago). With respect to the ages of these buildings, the country opted for retrofitting to increase seismic reliability.

Retrofitting optimal measures to address Old-type buildings included installation of additional steel braced frames, a quadrilateral rings of new foundations, and reinforced concrete collector elements.

Retrofitting measures to address Box-type buildings included primarily the addition of auxiliary reinforced concrete walls with respective openings to the pre-existing building.

== Studies ==
The German TaskForce for Earthquake composed of seismologists and engineers administered two operations to investigate the northeastern area of Venezuela.

The first TaskForce implemented Kinemetrics ALTUS K2 strong-motion accelerographs in 12 different sites encompassing various topographic and geologic conditions within the affected area to conduct aftershock studies. Collective amplification functions Sa/a for aftershock data were recorded by station Agua Caliente (AGS) which was positioned very close to the epicenter as well as the source of many aftershocks and station Cumaná Toyota (TOY) which was positioned near Toyota company where severely damaged occurred despite having reinforced-concrete frame structure. These data, along with the characteristics of soft soil in local sites, suggested that torsional effects are the primary cause of extensive structural damage. This is consistent with the finding of the program SLang that analyzes dynamic stress for the structural model, indicating the high level of compression and tensile strength where the heaviest damage took place. These findings inspire insights into the construction of earthquake-resistant structures with regard to the dynamic between torsional force and local soil conditions and can be applied to different locations with similar geological structures.

In May 1999, a second investigation was conducted by the engineering group. They performed ambient noise measurements at 60 additional sites around Cumaná and Cariaco to collect more seismic data for a more accurate assessment of site response characteristics. Through analyzing the spectral H/V-ratios of ambient noise data recorded on the ground surface, along with the observations of damage of adobe and brick masonry housings in the area near the station Chiguana Plaza, they found signs of resonant frequencies between subsoil and structure. This effect intensifies the shaking, causing severe damage.

== See also ==
- List of earthquakes in Venezuela
