= El Pilar Fault System =

Geological faults in Venezuela

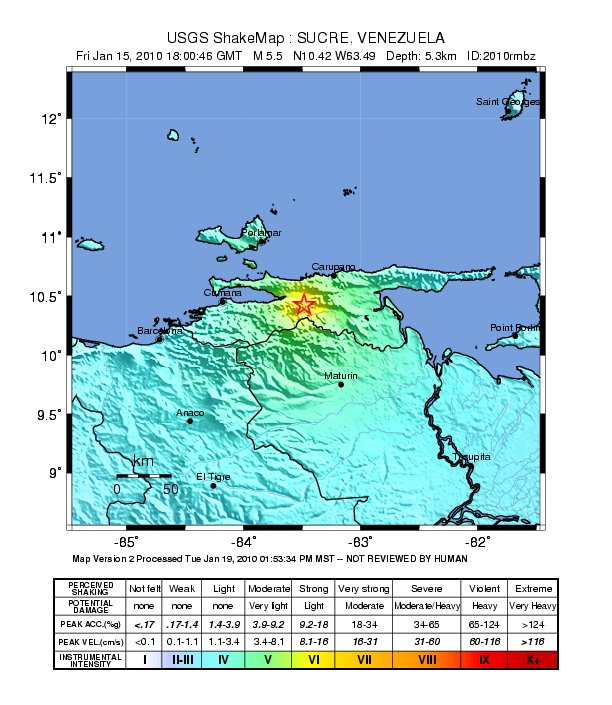
ShakeMap of the 2010 Venezuela earthquake that occurred along El Pilar Fault System.

The El Pilar Fault System (Spanish: Falla El Pilar) is a complex of active geological faults located in state of Sucre in northern Venezuela. The fault system is of right-lateral strike-slip type with an east–west orientation and forms part of the transform plate boundary between the Caribbean plate to the north and the South American plate to the south. Motion along the fault is largely transferred to the Warm Springs Fault in Trinidad Island.

== Geometry ==
At its western end it links to the San Sebastián Fault, with an extended area of overlap. This right-stepping offset led to the formation of the Cariaco pull-apart basin. The fault zone comes onshore near Cariaco, continuing eastwards until it reaches the Gulf of Paria. A mapped direct continuation of the fault to the east onshore Trinidad, formed during the late Miocene to Pliocene, is no longer thought to be active, based on GPS data. The major active structure in central Trinidad is the Central Range Fault and its western offshore continuation, the Warm Springs Fault. The link between the El Pilar Fault and the Warm Springs Fault is thought to be a set of northwest–southeast trending normal faults in the Gulf of Paria, forming a pull-apart basin across this right-stepping offset.

== Seismicity ==
The El Pilar fault system as a whole is seismically active, although some sections appear to creep aseismically, which may explain the relatively small number of major historical earthquakes associated with the fault system. Events that may have occurred on the fault system include earthquakes reported in 1530, 1684, 1766, 1797, 1853 (≥600 deaths), and 1929 (≥200 deaths). The largest recent event is the M7.3 1997 Cariaco earthquake, which struck close to the town of Cariaco and caused at least 80 deaths.
