= 1853 Cumaná earthquake =

Earthquake in Venezuela

- Location within Venezuela
- Local date: 15 July 1853
- Magnitude: M_{s} 7.1–7.3
- Depth: 14 km (8.7 mi)
- Epicenter: 10.5°N 64.2°W
- Areas affected: Venezuela
- Max. intensity: MMI IX (Violent)
- Tsunami: 5 m (16 ft)
- Casualties: 600–4,000 dead

On 15 July 1853, a major earthquake struck the city of Cumaná in Venezuela, killing between 600 and 4,000 people. This earthquake caused heavy damage in Cumaná, where many people were killed. It also triggered a tsunami with a run-up height of 5 m (16 ft).

== Earthquake ==
Isoseismal VIII (Severe) on the Modified Mercalli intensity was assigned to an elongated area with a 65–90 km (40–56 mi) long axis. Based on this value, the estimated surface-wave magnitude was 7.1–7.3. It may have been caused by a rupture along the offshore segment of the El Pilar Fault System where it forms the northern boundary of the Cariaco Trough, a pull-apart basin.

A maximum Modified Mercalli intensity of IX was observed in Cumaná and Barrio Caiguie. Intensity VII was assigned to Cumanacoa, Aricagua, Cariaco, and Santa Fe. Various death tolls were reported; 600, 800, 1,000 and 4,000. Damage in Cumaná was heavy; in the Saint Agnes and Altagracia parishes, at least 113 people died. Many public buildings and homes were destroyed; the few homes left standing were unsafe for occupation. The earthquake generated a tsunami that was reported in Sabana de Salgado, Sabana de Caiguire, Puerto Sucre, and Cumaná. The tsunami was 5–6 m (16–20 ft) meters tall and flooded 200 varas inland.
