= 1894 Mérida earthquake =

Earthquake in Venezuela

- Location within Venezuela
- Local date: April 28, 1894
- Local time: 10:30 PM VET
- Magnitude: 7.6 M_{w}
- Depth: 18.24 km (11 mi)
- Epicenter: 8.55°N 71.72°W
- Fault: Boconó Fault
- Type: Strike-slip
- Max. intensity: MMI X (Extreme)
- Tsunami: No
- Landslides: Yes
- Casualties: 350 dead

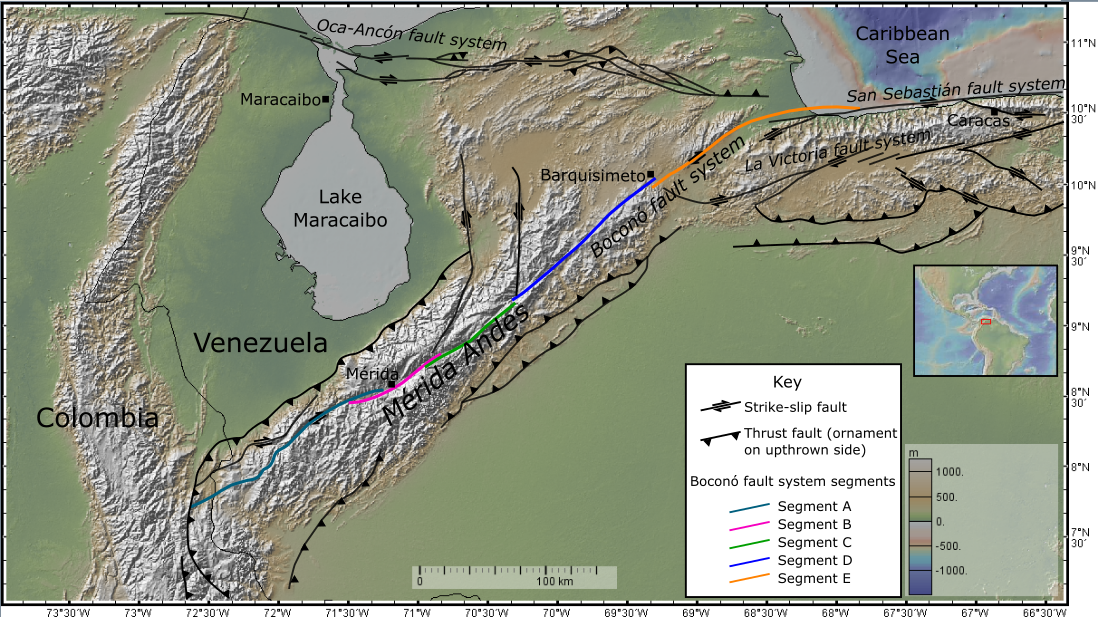
Map of the Boconó Fault, showing the main segments and related structures.

On April 28, 1894 the southwestern Mérida Andes was struck by a major earthquake at 10:30 p.m. local time. It caused widespread destruction both in Colombia and Venezuela leading to at least 350 deaths. It had an estimated moment magnitude (M_{w}) of 7.6 and the intensity of shaking reached X (extreme) on the Modified Mercalli intensity scale.

== Tectonic setting ==
The Mérida Andes mark the boundary between the North Andes Block and the South American plate. The mountain range is the result of continuing transpression along this boundary. The main structure is the Boconó Fault, a right lateral strike-slip fault zone, which has been subdivided into five segments. The component of shortening across the boundary is taken up by thrust faults, parallel to the Boconó Fault, both to the northwest and southeast of that structure, creating most of the topography. All of the segments of the Boconó Fault are thought to be seismically active.

== Earthquake ==
The earthquake's magnitude, epicentral location and hypocentral depth have all been estimated from the distribution of seismic intensities taken from contemporary reports of earthquake damage. The magnitude of M_{w} 7.6 was estimated using a hypocentral depth of 18.24±1.66 km, calculated from isoseismal data, and the radius of the area where the earthquake was felt.

The earthquake ruptured the southwestern-most segment of the Boconó Fault (A), based on the distribution of damage and evidence from paleoseismological investigations along the fault trace.

== Damage ==
The area of significant damage is estimated to be about 7,000 km^{2}, extending from near Pamplona in Columbia to Trujillo in Venezuela. The most severe damage occurred between the towns of Bailadores and Tabay. The towns of Chiguará, Mérida, Mesa Bolívar, Santa Cruz de Mora and Tovar were completely destroyed. There were approximately 350 fatalities.
